= Broomfleet railway station =

Railway station in the East Riding of Yorkshire, England

Broomfleet
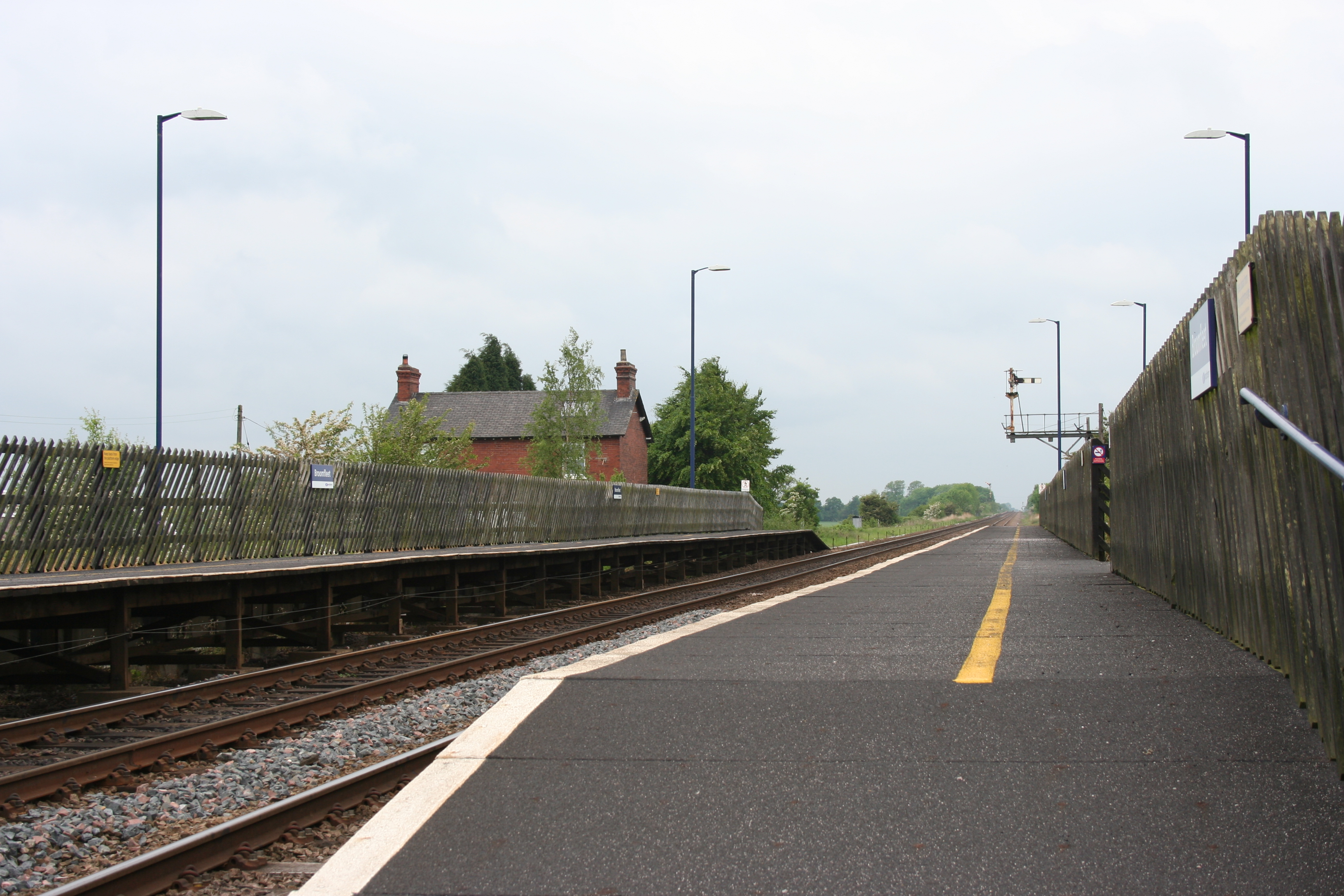

General information
- Location: Broomfleet, East Riding of Yorkshire; England
- Coordinates: 53.74000°N 0.67098°W
- Grid reference: SE876279
- Manager: Northern
- Platforms: 2

Other information
- Station code: BMF
- Classification: DfT category F2

History
- Original company: Hull and Selby Railway
- Pre-grouping: North Eastern Railway
- Post-grouping: London and North Eastern Railway

Key dates
- 1 July 1840: Opened as Bromfleet
- January 1851: Renamed Broomfleet
- October 1861: Closed to regular traffic
- November 1872: Reopened for regular traffic

Passengers
- 2021/22: ▲586
- 2022/23: ▲790
- 2023/24: ▲894
- 2024/25: ▲1,300
- 2025/26: ▼1,170
Location
Notes
- Passenger statistics from the Office of Rail and Road

Broomfleet railway station serves the village of Broomfleet in the East Riding of Yorkshire, England. The station is on the Selby Line 14 1/2 miles (23.3 km) west of Hull. The station, and all trains serving it, are operated by Northern. Formerly located on a quadrupled section of line with platforms on the outer ('slow') lines only, the station was rebuilt when the section from Gilberdyke was reduced to double track around 1987.

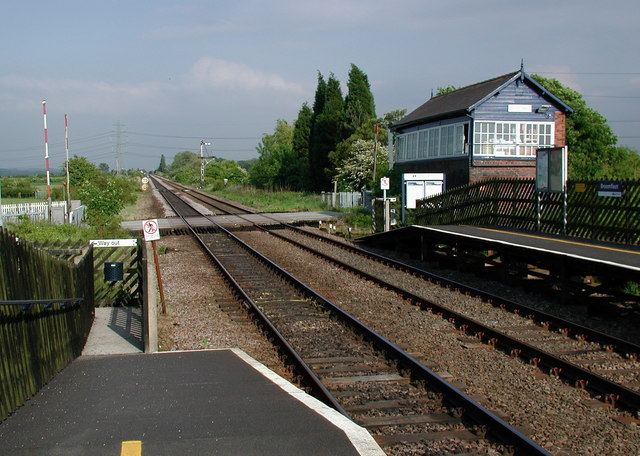
Broomfleet level crossing

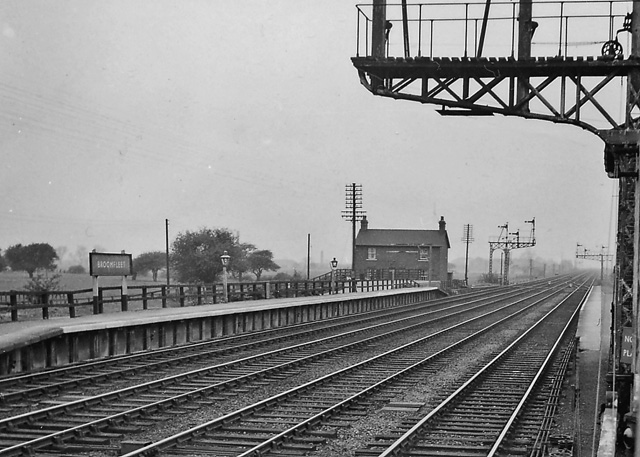
Broomfleet Station in 1961

== History ==
The station was opened on 1 July 1840 by the Hull and Selby Railway; originally named Bromfleet, it was renamed Broomfleet in January 1851 by the York and North Midland Railway. From October 1861 to November 1872 the station was not served by timetabled passenger trains. For many years it had a very sparse train service on market days only. A full service was introduced by the North Eastern Railway in October 1907.

== Facilities ==
The station is an unstaffed halt with only basic shelters and timetable poster boards on offer. Tickets can only be bought on the train or prior to travel. Step-free access is available to both platforms via ramps, but this is via the adjacent level crossing and so care is advised when using it.

== Services ==
There is a limited and somewhat irregular service to and from Broomfleet with six trains per day Monday to Saturday towards Hull eastbound and seven per day towards Doncaster or York westbound. There is no Sunday service.

Preceding station	National Rail	Following station
Gilberdyke	Northern; Selby Line; Mondays-Saturdays only	Brough
