= Wressle railway station =

Railway station in the East Riding of Yorkshire, England

Wressle
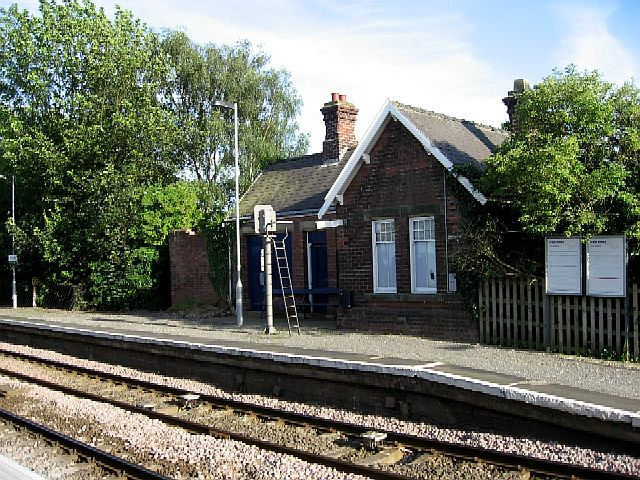

General information
- Location: Wressle, East Riding of Yorkshire; England
- Coordinates: 53.77292°N 0.92401°W
- Grid reference: SE710312
- Manager: Northern
- Platforms: 2

Other information
- Station code: WRS
- Classification: DfT category F2

History
- Opened: 1840

Passengers
- 2021/22: ▲502
- 2022/23: ▼494
- 2023/24: ▲948
- 2024/25: ▲1,064
- 2025/26: ▲1,210
Location
Notes
- Passenger statistics from the Office of Rail and Road

Wressle railway station is a railway station on the Selby Line that serves the village of Wressle in the East Riding of Yorkshire, England. It is situated 25 miles (40 km) west of Hull Paragon.

== History ==
The Hull and Selby Railway was opened 2 July 1840. Wressle station does not appear to have been an original feature of the line; (Note: Butt (1995) states the station opened on 2 July 1840. However the station does not appear in contemporary newspaper reports, or in the 2 July 1840 timetable.) however a market day service from "Wressel Bridge" was recorded in 1843.

The station was in full use by 1855. The station was a single storey brick structure with a verandah, located on the south platform. The spellings Wressel and Wressle have both been used, with the 'Wressle' becoming standard after around 1863.

Wressle was listed for closure in the 1963 Beeching report, but remained open to avoid local hardship. The station became unstaffed in 1976.

== Facilities ==
The station has very basic amenities – it has a waiting shelter on platform 1, a single customer help point on platform 2 and timetable poster boards on each side. There is no ticket machine or live travel information (including audio announcements), so passengers must buy tickets in advance or on the train, keep themselves aware of train delays and double check the destination of the train before boarding. Step-free access is available to both platforms via the level crossing at the eastern end, although there is a gap and step up to board the train.

== Services ==
Seven trains a day call at Wressle (Mon-Sat) in the December 2024 timetable (mostly in peak periods); four to York and three to Hull. Two of the Hull trains continue to Bridlington via Beverley. On Sunday five trains call at Wressle, three to York and two to Hull. A normal Monday to Friday service operates on Bank holidays.

The station, and all trains serving it, are operated by Northern.

Preceding station	National Rail	Following station
Selby	Northern York - Hull - Bridlington	Howden

== December 2025 timetable changes ==
From 14 December 2025 there were new timetables for all services that use or cross the East Coast Mainline (ECML) as a part of a decade long infrastructure and service improvement plan to increase the capacity and frequency of ECML services.

Services from Wressle either enter the ECML just west of Selby at Hambleton Junction or south of York at Colton Junction, there are some minor timetable changes on services Monday to Saturday.

Unexpectedly, Wressle has gained Sunday services as a part of this timetable change.

On Sundays three trains call towards York at 09:18, 13:21 & 19:15, and two trains call towards Hull at 17:19 & 20:18.
