= North Howden =

Hamlet in the East Riding of Yorkshire, England

Coordinates: 53.765202°N 0.860298°W

- Location within the East Riding of Yorkshire
- OS grid reference: SE752304
  - London: 160 mi (260 km) S
- Civil parish: Howden
- Unitary authority: East Riding of Yorkshire
- Ceremonial county: East Riding of Yorkshire
- Region: Yorkshire and the Humber
- Country: England
- Sovereign state: United Kingdom
- Post town: GOOLE
- Postcode district: DN14
- Dialling code: 01430
- Police: Humberside
- Fire: Humberside
- Ambulance: Yorkshire
- UK Parliament: Goole and Pocklington

North Howden is a hamlet in the East Riding of Yorkshire, England. It is situated approximately 1.5 miles (2.4 km) north of the town of Howden. It lies on the B1228 road where it crosses the Hull to York railway line.

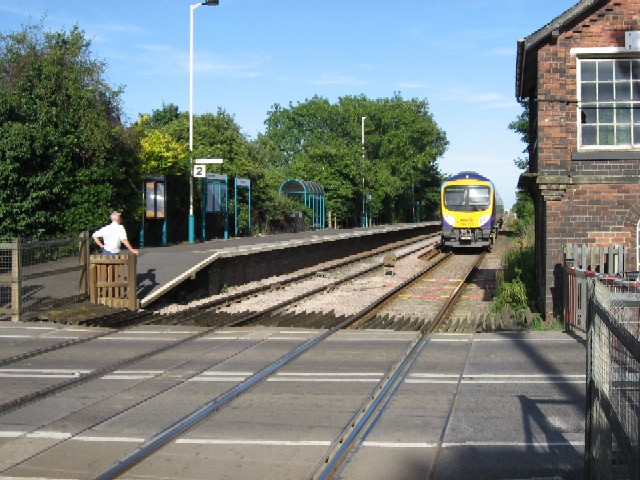
Howden Station

It forms part of the civil parish of Howden.

Since 1840 Howden railway station on the Selby Line has been located here. The station and associated station master's house was designated a Grade II listed building in 1987. The signal box was also designated Grade II in 1989.
