= Ferriby railway station =

Railway station in the East Riding of Yorkshire, England

Ferriby
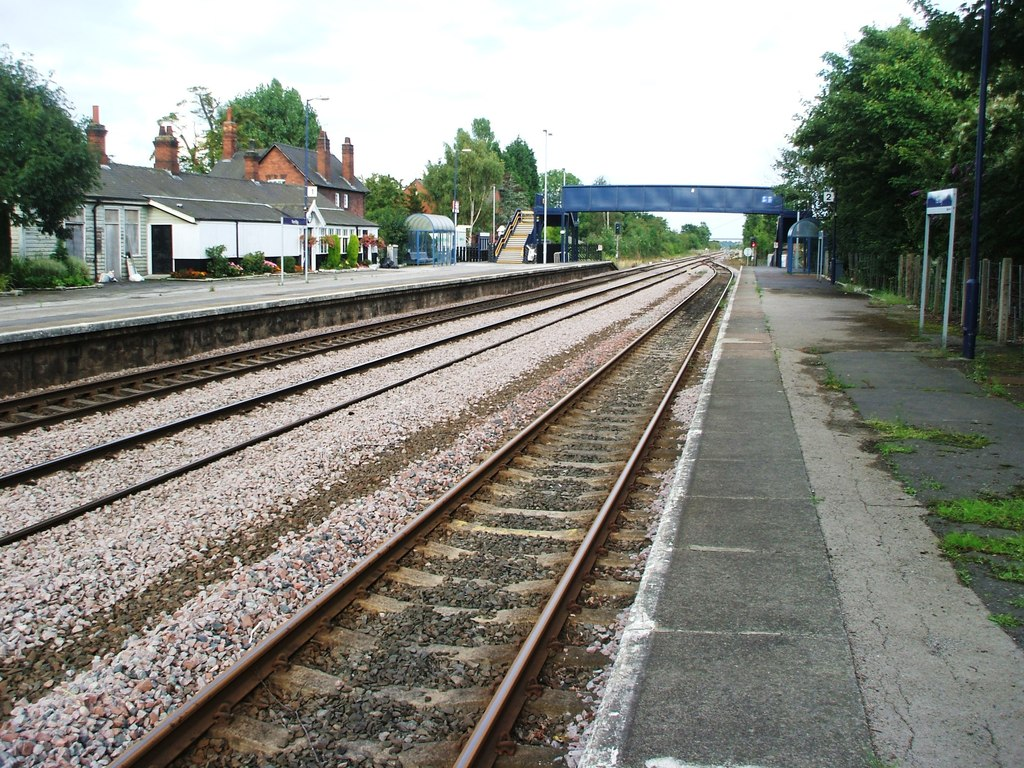

General information
- Location: North Ferriby, East Riding of Yorkshire; England
- Coordinates: 53.71682°N 0.50600°W
- Grid reference: SE985255
- Manager: Northern
- Platforms: 2

Other information
- Station code: FRY
- Classification: DfT category F2

History
- Opened: 1840

Passengers
- 2020/21: ▼5,342
- 2021/22: ▲28,622
- 2022/23: ▲41,570
- 2023/24: ▲47,348
- 2024/25: ▲55,512
Location
Notes
- Passenger statistics from the Office of Rail and Road

Ferriby railway station serves the village of North Ferriby in the East Riding of Yorkshire, England. The station, and all trains serving it, are operated by Northern. It is situated on the former Hull and Selby Railway, 7 1/2 miles (12.1 km) west of Hull Paragon. It has a slightly unusual layout, in that the eastbound platform is located on the main running line but the westbound one is on a loop which continues on towards Brough. The line from Gilberdyke towards Hull through here was quadrupled at the beginning of the 20th century by the NER but reduced to mainly double track again by British Rail in the early 1970s – the section from here westwards though kept the additional running line to allow it to serve a (now demolished) cement works next to the line at Melton Halt, so the westbound platform was left unaltered whereas the opposite one was extended outwards to meet the running line.

== Facilities ==
It is unstaffed, but has ticketing facilities, so passengers do not need to buy tickets in advance of travel or on the train. The main buildings are now privately owned, but there are shelters on both platforms and a footbridge linking them. Train running details are provided by information screens, timetable posters and telephone. Step-free access is available to both platforms.

== Services ==
The station has a basic hourly service in each direction on weekdays (with extras at peak times), provided by the Hull to Doncaster stopping trains. Some Hull-bound trains continue toward Bridlington, whilst a small number of York trains call during the weekday peaks.

There is an hourly service each way on Sundays from mid-morning.

Preceding station	National Rail	Following station
Brough	Northern; Selby Line	Hessle
	Historical railways	
Melton Halt; Line open, station closed	North Eastern Railway	Hessle; Line and station open
