= Brough railway station =

Railway station in the East Riding of Yorkshire, England

Brough
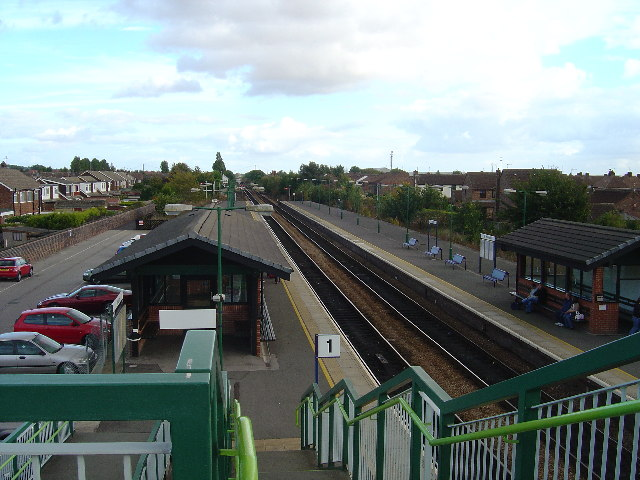
- Brough railway station, 2005

General information
- Location: Brough, East Riding of Yorkshire; England
- Coordinates: 53.72670°N 0.57700°W
- Grid reference: SE939265
- Managed by: TransPennine Express
- Platforms: 2

Other information
- Station code: BUH
- Classification: DfT category E

History
- Opened: 1840

Passengers
- 2020/21: ▼88,780
- Interchange: ▼1,159
- 2021/22: ▲0.361 million
- Interchange: ▲4,510
- 2022/23: ▲0.417 million
- Interchange: ▲7,623
- 2023/24: ▲0.473 million
- Interchange: ▲8,860
- 2024/25: ▲0.552 million
- Interchange: ▲10,742
Location
Notes
- Passenger statistics from the Office of Rail and Road

Brough railway station serves the town of Brough in the East Riding of Yorkshire, England. It is managed by TransPennine Express, and also served by Northern, Hull Trains and London North Eastern Railway.

The station was originally opened by the Hull and Selby Railway in 1840 and at one time had four tracks passing through. The course of the additional outer tracks (and the two disused platform faces) are still visible, although these were removed in the early 1970s.

== Facilities ==
There is a ticket office inside the main building which is staffed each day from start of service until 19:45 (18:30 on Sundays) and there is a self-service ticket machine (card only) outside the door available 24 hours a day. There is also a vending machine and a refreshment stall open each morning. There is a waiting room on each platform and step-free access to both is available (to platform 2 via ramps onto the footbridge). Automated public address announcements and digital display screens were upgraded by TransPennine Express in 2017. Free Wi-Fi is also being introduced to the station.

There is a pay and display car park located north and south of the station, whilst Brough centre and bus services are a short walk from the station.

== Services ==
All services on the various routes out of Hull call at the station, giving it good links with many towns and cities in the rest of Yorkshire. There are also several through trains each day to and from London King's Cross, courtesy of Hull Trains (seven departures each day) and London North Eastern Railway. (one morning service outbound, returning in the evening).

Sunday sees an hourly service to Sheffield and every two hours to York & Manchester (with some extra trains in the afternoon). There are now also through trains to Scarborough all year since the December 2009 timetable change.

Northern had promised to introduce an additional hourly service between Leeds and Bridlington. Service frequency improvements were also to be implemented on the York & Sheffield routes, both on weekdays and on Sundays as part of the new franchise agreement. The additional Northern service (from Hull to Halifax via Leeds and Bradford Interchange) began at the 2019 winter timetable change.

As of May 2025, the typical off-peak service pattern is as follows:

TransPennine Express

- 1tph - Liverpool Lime Street via Leeds and Manchester Victoria
- 1tph - Hull

Northern

- 4tph - Hull (2tph continues beyond Hull to Bridlington or Scarborough via the Yorkshire Coast Line)
- 2tph - Doncaster via Goole (one fast, one stopping). Express service continues to Sheffield (one evening departure operates via Selby).
- 1tph - York (via Selby and either Sherburn-in-Elmet or direct)
- 1tph - Halifax via Leeds (all stations stopping service west of Selby)

Hull Trains

- 1tp2h - London Kings Cross via Selby and Doncaster
- 1tp2h - Hull with 1tpd continuing to Beverley (via the Yorkshire Coast Line)

London North Eastern Railway

- 1tpd - London Kings Cross via Doncaster
- 1tpd - Hull

== Gallery ==
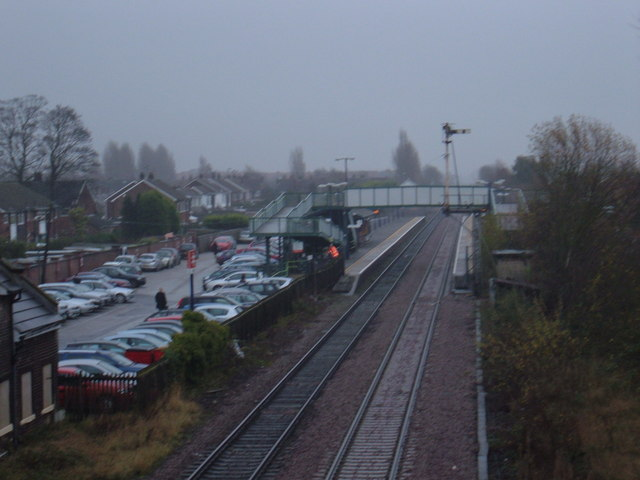
Looking East, 2009

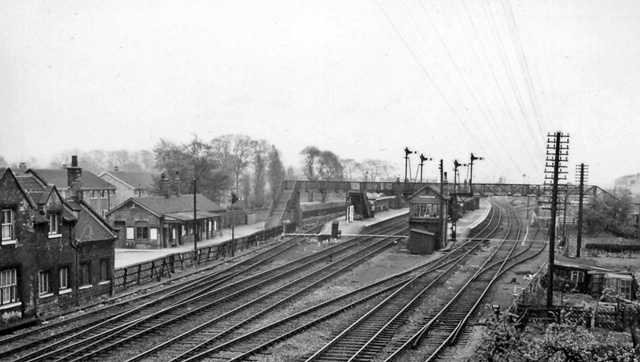
The station in 1961

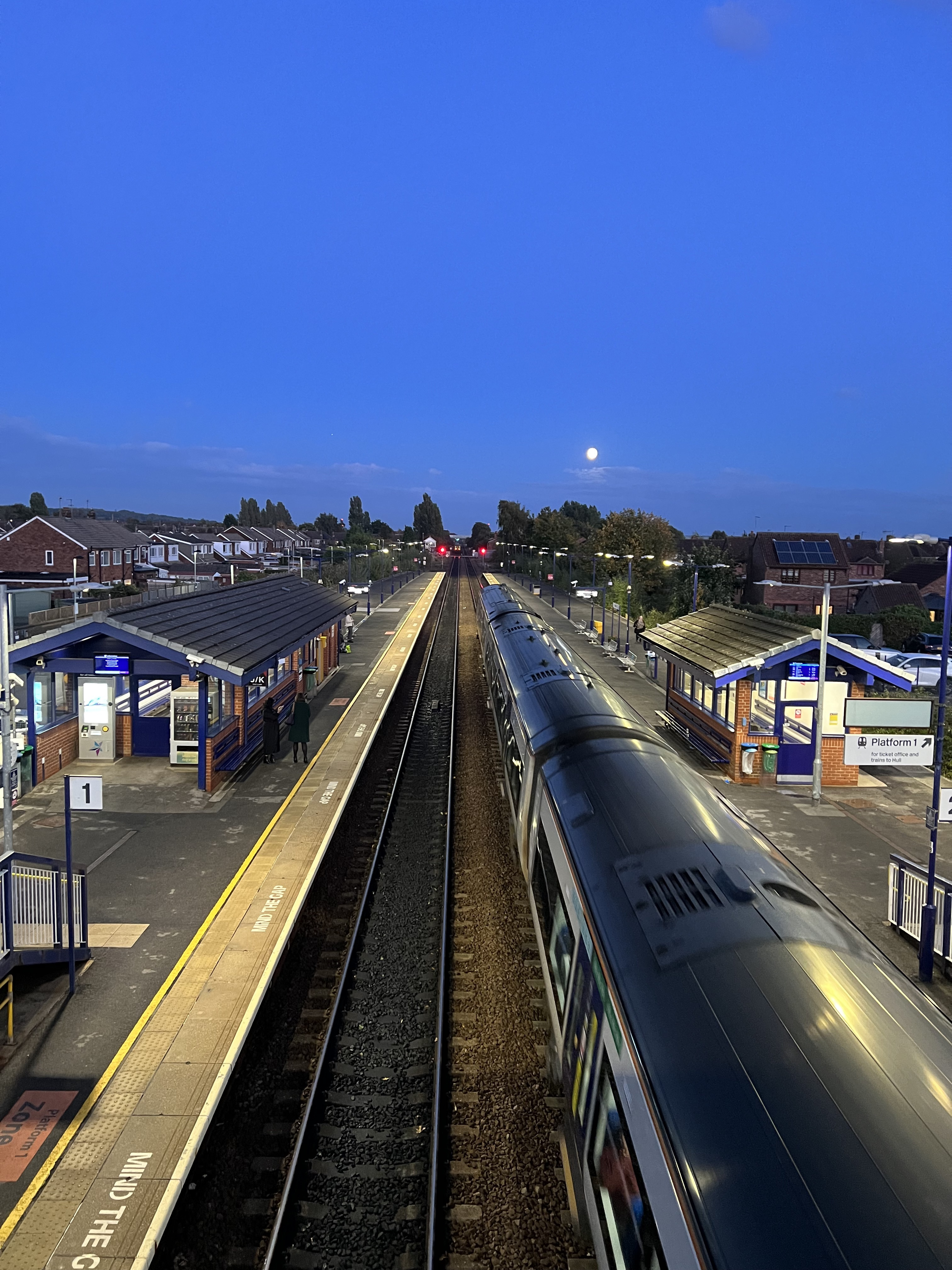
The station during the evening, 2022

Preceding station	National Rail	Following station
Selby	London North Eastern Railway; East Coast Main Line (Limited service)	Hull Paragon
Selby	TransPennine Express; North TransPennine	Hull Paragon
Gilberdyke	TransPennine Express; North TransPennine	Hull Paragon
Howden	Hull Trains; London–Hull	Hull Paragon
Broomfleet	Northern; Selby Line	Ferriby
	Historical railways	
Broomfleet; Line and station open	North Eastern Railway	Melton Halt; Line open, station closed
