= Howden railway station =

Railway station in the East Riding of Yorkshire, England

Howden
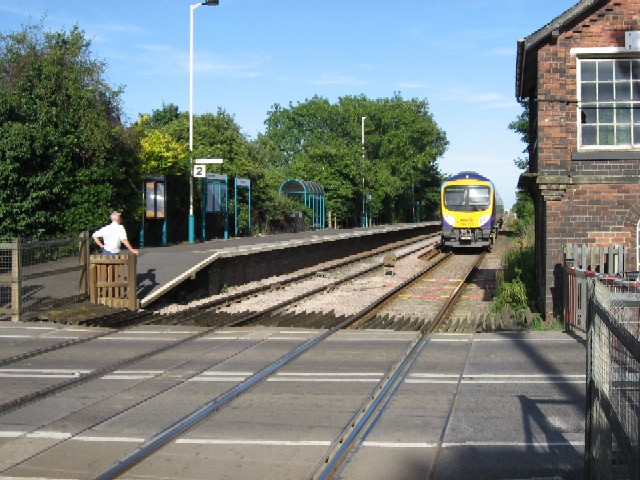

General information
- Location: Howden, East Riding of Yorkshire; England
- Coordinates: 53.764735°N 0.860000°W
- Grid reference: SE751304
- Managed by: Northern
- Platforms: 2

Other information
- Station code: HOW
- Classification: DfT category F1

History
- Opened: 1840

Passengers
- 2020/21: ▼15,070
- 2021/22: ▲75,912
- 2022/23: ▲93,820
- 2023/24: ▲0.123 million
- 2024/25: ▲0.136 million
Location
Notes
- Passenger statistics from the Office of Rail and Road

Howden railway station serves the market town of Howden in the East Riding of Yorkshire, England. It is situated approximately 1.5 miles (2.4 km) north of the town in the hamlet of North Howden and is 22 1/4 miles (35.8 km) west of Hull Paragon. The station is managed by Northern, but is also served by TransPennine Express and Hull Trains.

== History ==
The station was originally opened by the Hull and Selby Railway (H&SR) on 1 July 1840 as Howden and Bubwith, and was renamed as Howden on 16 April 1869. In 1885 the Hull and Barnsley Railway (H&BR) opened its own Howden station on the northern edge of Howden itself. On 1 July 1922 the H&SR station was renamed North Howden, while the H&BR station was renamed South Howden. North Howden reverted to Howden on 12 June 1961, following South Howden's closure to passengers in 1955. In 1987 Howden station was designated a Grade II listed building and is now recorded in the National Heritage List for England, maintained by Historic England.

== Facilities ==
The station is not staffed but has tickets machines on each platforms; or buy tickets in advance of travel. The former buildings still stand, but are now in residential use. The platforms are staggered either side of a level crossing - this provides step-free access to both and the link between them. There are shelters on both platforms, along with digital information screens. Train running information can also be gained from timetable posters.

== Services ==
The station now has a regular frequency service (approximately hourly each way), thanks to recent improvements in the York to Hull line timetable. All westbound trains call at Selby and then continue to either York (Northern) or London King's Cross (Hull Trains). There is also a limited service to and from Leeds and Liverpool Lime Street (a.m. peak only). Eastbound, there is at least one departure per hour to Hull provided by the various operators that call there. Since the new 2019 winter timetable was introduced, many of these now run through to Bridlington.

On Sundays, five services are provided by Hull Trains and eight services are provided by Northern in each direction at various points throughout the day. No TPE services stop here on Sundays.

Preceding station	National Rail	Following station
Selby	Hull Trains; London–Hull	Brough
Selby	TransPennine Express; North TransPennine; Mondays–Saturdays only	Gilberdyke
Wressle	Northern Selby Line	Eastrington

== See also ==
- Listed buildings in Howden
