= Melton Halt railway station =

Disused railway station in the East Riding of Yorkshire, England

Melton Halt
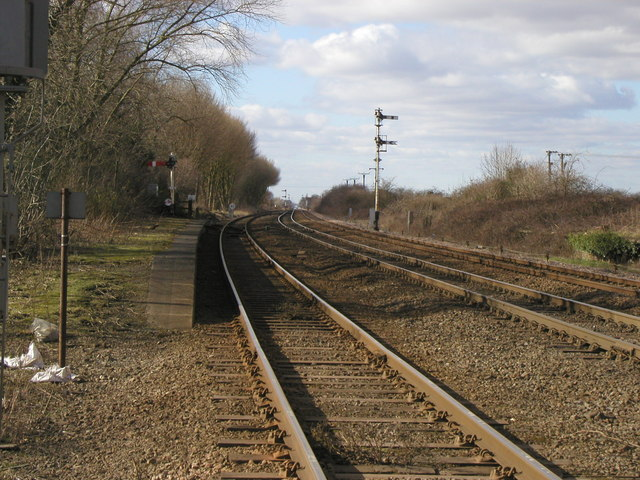
- Platform remains in March 2006

General information
- Location: Melton, East Riding of Yorkshire; England
- Coordinates: 53.7192°N 0.5323°W
- Grid reference: SE969257
- Platforms: 2

Other information
- Status: Disused

History
- Original company: North Eastern Railway
- Pre-grouping: North Eastern Railway
- Post-grouping: London and North Eastern Railway

Key dates
- by October 1920: Opened as Melton Crossing Halt
- by February 1965: Renamed Melton Halt
- 10 July 1989: Station closed
Location

Melton Halt railway station was a worker's station built on the Hull and Selby line near Melton. The halt was built for works trains to and from the Humber Portland Cement Company's works (Humber Cement Works), and operated from 1920 to 1989.

== History ==
In June 1920 the North Eastern Railway was approached by the Humber Portland Cement Company with a request for a station halt for their new works near Melton. The company offered to pay the construction costs, and guaranteed a minimum number of tickets to be purchased.

The halt was located at the "Melton Crossing" level crossing. The initial halt was a two platform station with the platforms on the slow lines of the quadruple track at the crossing. The halt opened in October 1920, and was originally named Melton Crossing Halt. It was situated between Brough and Ferriby.

The station was renamed Melton Halt by British Railways by February 1965. In 1970 after one of the tracks was removed (Hull slow) a new platform was constructed.

The station was closed by British Rail on 10 July 1989.

== Potential reopening ==
In June 2019, it was revealed that Hull Local Enterprise Partnership were looking at reopening the station as a major parkway station for InterCity services next to Melton West Business Park and the A63 road. If plans come to fruition it would be the first station to open in East Yorkshire for over 100 years.

Preceding station	Historical railways	Following station
Brough; Line and station open	Hull and Selby Railway	Ferriby; Line and station open
