= Hessle railway station =

Railway station in the East Riding of Yorkshire, England

Hessle
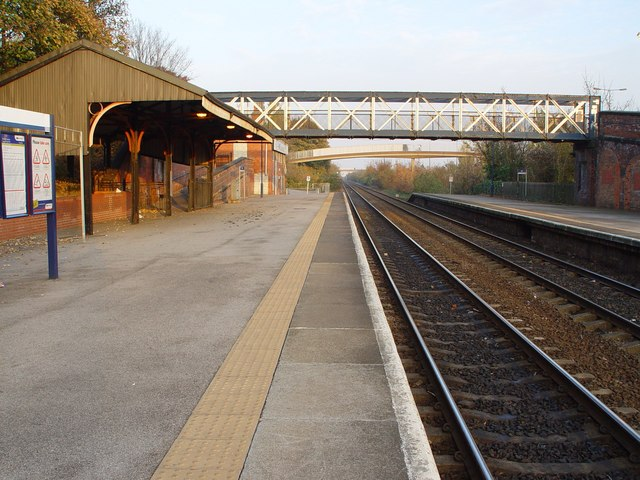

General information
- Location: Hessle, East Riding of Yorkshire; England
- Coordinates: 53.71698°N 0.44000°W
- Grid reference: TA029256
- Managed by: Northern Trains
- Platforms: 2

Other information
- Station code: HES
- Classification: DfT category F2

History
- Opened: 1840

Passengers
- 2020/21: ▼5,934
- 2021/22: ▲34,294
- 2022/23: ▲45,486
- 2023/24: ▲61,774
- 2024/25: ▲82,812
Location
Notes
- Passenger statistics from the Office of Rail and Road

Hessle railway station serves the town of Hessle in the East Riding of Yorkshire, England. The station, and all trains serving it, are operated by Northern.

This is the nearest station on the north bank of the Humber to the Humber Bridge and good views of the structure can be had from the platforms when looking west. It was opened in 1840 by the Hull and Selby Railway and is 4 3/4 miles (7.6 km) west of Hull Paragon. The platforms were originally aligned as to serve the outer lines only when the railway was quadrupled early in the 20th century, but following the removal of the outer lines in the early 1970s by British Rail, they were extended out to meet the surviving centre tracks.

== Facilities ==
The station is unstaffed and it does have a ticket machine – intending passengers may still buy their ticket in advance or on the train. The main building is still present but not in railway use, though the old NER shelter on the eastbound side is still available (a more modern structure is provided on the other side). Step-free access is available to both platforms via ramps from the nearby road (east side) and the footbridge (west side). Timetable posters, passenger information screens and a telephone provide train running details.

== Services ==
The station has the same service level as neighbouring Ferriby i.e. hourly in each direction on weekdays (with extras at peak times) to Hull and Doncaster. A limited number of trains to/from York call at peak periods.

There is now an hourly service on Sundays each way from mid-morning – an improvement on the limited one offered in years past.

Preceding station	National Rail	Following station
Ferriby	Northern; Selby Line	Hull Paragon
