= Hemingbrough railway station =

Former railway station in England

Hemingbrough
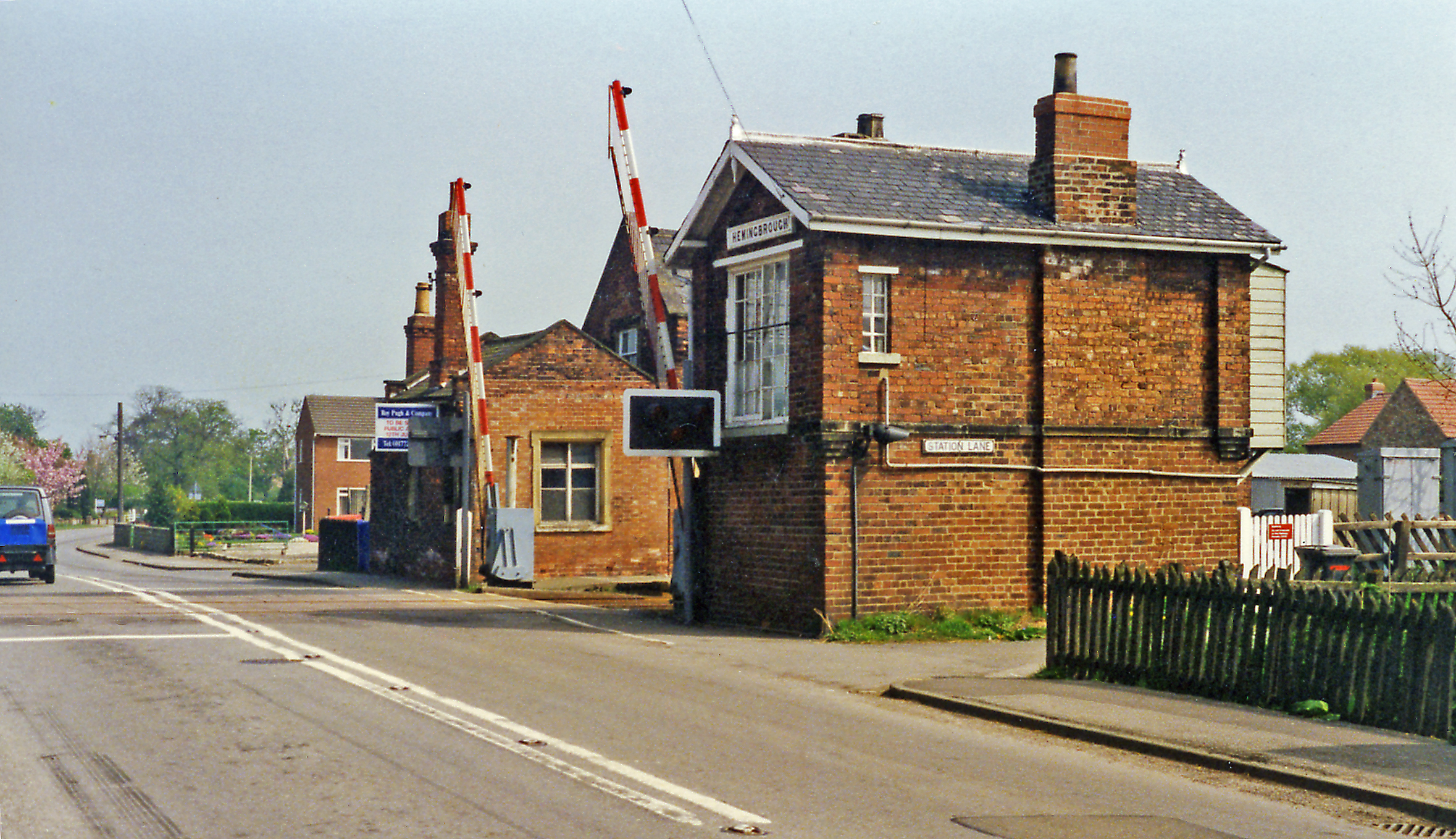
- Signal box and level crossing at the former station site (1995)

General information
- Location: Hemingbrough, North Yorkshire; England
- Coordinates: 53.7821°N 0.9959°W
- Platforms: 2

Other information
- Status: Disused

History
- Original company: Hull and Selby Railway
- Pre-grouping: North Eastern Railway
- Post-grouping: London and North Eastern Railway

Key dates
- 1 July 1840: Opened as Cliff
- 1 September 1874: Renamed Hemingbrough
- 6 November 1967: Closed
Location

Cliff railway station was opened in 1840 as an original station of the Hull and Selby Railway. It was renamed Hemingbrough railway station in 1874.

The station closed in 1967.

== History ==
Cliff railway station was opened 2 July 1840 in the village of Cliffe, Selby as an original station of the Hull and Selby Railway. The station was renamed to Hemingbrough on 1 September 1874.

The station had a small set of sidings north of the line, with an eastern line of track serving a malthouse.

Hemingbrough was the only station on the Hull and Selby line to close as a result of the Beeching report. The station closed to goods on 4 May 1964, and to passengers on 6 November 1967.
