= Hull Paragon rail accident =

1927 rail crash in England

Coordinates: 53.7459°N 0.3583°W

Details
- Date: 14 February 1927; About 09:10
- Location: Hull Paragon station
- Country: England, UK
- Line: London and North Eastern Railway
- Cause: Signaller's error

Statistics
- Trains: 2
- Deaths: 12
- Injured: 24

The Hull Paragon Rail accident was a rail crash that took place at Hull Paragon railway station.

On 14 February 1927, on the approaches to Hull Paragon station, the incoming 08:22 from Withernsea to Hull collided head-on with the 09:05 from Hull to Scarborough. Twelve passengers were killed and 24 were seriously injured. This happened despite the tracks having the latest safety features available at the time: a system of interlocking should have made it impossible to give clear signals to trains unless the route to be used is proved to be safe. In his book L. T. C. Rolt comments that "Scarcely any safety device existing at the time was lacking on the network of lines outside Paragon station..." - however, one safety device did exist and was lacking - a track circuit which had been invented in the USA in the 1870s and began to be used in the UK from the beginning of the 20th century. There were no track circuits protecting the layout at Hull in February 1927. In his report on the accident, Col. J. W. Pringle recommended installation of a track circuit, which the LNER then carried out.

Three signalmen were present in the signalbox, the enquiry found that one of them had pulled the wrong lever; he had intended to set the points for the incoming train but instead set the points ahead of the Scarborough. The points were locked and could not be moved as long as the signal ahead of the Scarborough train was at clear, and also by the presence of locomotive or vehicle wheels on the locking bar immediately in rear of the points. One of the other signalmen was setting the signals behind the Scarborough train to danger and, in contravention of the rules, this was done whilst the train was still passing the signal and before it had reached the locking bar. This released the locking on the points for some 1.9 seconds before the Scarborough train reached the locking bar, allowing the points to be changed by the application of the wrong lever. A combination of these two failings led to the disaster.

== Sources ==
- Rolt, L. T. C.; Kichenside, Geoffrey (1982) [1955]. Red for Danger (4th ed.). Newton Abbot: David & Charles. pp. 214–218. ISBN 0-7153-8362-0.
