= Hull and Selby Railway =

Railway line between Kingston upon Hull and Selby, England

- Company Seal
- Predecessor: Leeds and Hull Railroad Company (1824) unbuilt
- Founded: 1836 (Act of Parliament); 1840 (Opening)
- Fate: track owned by Network Rail, services by various operators
- Successor: 1845 leased by: York and North Midland Railway (Y&NMR) and Manchester and Leeds Railway (M&LR); 1854 leased by: North Eastern Railway (NER); 1872 acquired by: North Eastern Railway (NER); 1923 merged into: London and North Eastern Railway (LNER); 1948 merged into: British Railways (BR)

The Hull and Selby Railway is a railway line between Kingston upon Hull and Selby in the United Kingdom which was authorised by an act of Parliament in 1836 and opened in 1840. As built the line connected with the Leeds and Selby Railway (opened 1834) at Selby, with a Hull terminus adjacent to the Humber Dock.

A connection to Cottingham, Beverley, Driffield and Bridlington was made in 1846 with the opening of the Hull and Selby Railway (Bridlington Branch), now part of the Yorkshire Coast Line; a new 4 1/2-mile (7.2 km) route into Hull was opened in 1848, along with a new main station, Hull Paragon; a connection to Market Weighton from Barlby near Selby was made in 1848 (closed 1954, see Selby to Driffield Line); an urban branch line terminating in east Hull, the Victoria Dock Branch Line was opened in 1853 (closed 1968); a connection at Gilberdyke onto the Hull and Doncaster Railway passing via Goole was made in 1863; and in 1871 North Eastern Railway's York and Doncaster branch opened in 1871, with its northern half branching from the line towards York just east of Selby.

From 1845 the Hull and Selby Railway Company was jointly leased by the York and North Midland Railway, and Manchester and Leeds Railway; the lease passed to the North Eastern Railway in 1854 who then acquired the company in 1872. Ownership then passed to the London and North Eastern Railway in 1923, and to British Railways in 1948.

As of 2015 the line is in use, and is owned and maintained by Network Rail. It is an important mainline on the UK rail network, and used on rail services out of Hull by Northern, TransPennine Express, London North Eastern Railway, and Hull Trains with destinations including Leeds, Doncaster, Sheffield, Goole and London, as well as freight traffic from the Port of Hull.

== History ==
=== Background ===
The Leeds and Hull Railroad Company was formed in 1824 in Leeds, one of a number of railway schemes that would form a set of railways from the Irish Sea (Liverpool) to the North Sea (Hull). (Note: The other lines were the Liverpool and Manchester Railway Company, and the Manchester and Leeds Railway company (M&LR).) The line was surveyed by Joseph Locke and assistant under the direction of George Stephenson; Stephenson's plan for the line was for a double track railway, worked by locomotives, with stationary engines working inclined planes on the rising ground east of Leeds.

The Leeds and Hull scheme was not adequately subscribed by shareholders, and made no significant progress until 1828, by which time the Knottingley to Goole section of the Aire and Calder Navigation canal has opened (1826). The rise of Goole as a north sea port and a rival to Hull was one factor into prompting the Hull-based shareholders of the scheme to resolve to bring forward half of the scheme – a railway line from Leeds to Selby, with the intention of taking traffic from Selby to Hull by Steam Packets. A general meeting of the Leeds and Hull shareholders formed the Leeds and Selby Railway Company in 1829. The line between Leeds and Selby was resurveyed by James Walker – in addition to minor changes to the route the stationary engines and inclined planes were replaced with a tunnel. Walker's plan was adopted in 1829, and the Leeds and Selby act was passed in 1830, and the line opened in 1834.

=== The Hull and Selby Railway (1834–45) ===
In the early 1830s the rise of Goole as a port, as well as plans for railways to Bridlington and Scarborough which posed a potential threat to Hull's port economy gave impetus to the need for a rail link westwards from Hull. John Exley, a Hull customs officer was prominent in promoting a line, (Note: One of the railway's first locomotives was named 'Exley', after John Exley, an early agitator for the line.) after and the campaign was taken up by the local press and trade organisations; two local bankers raised the £20,000 required to sponsor a bill through Parliament.

The original plan for a line from Leeds to Hull was continued with a new survey by Walker and Burgess in 1834. The engineers noted that the path from Selby to Hull was practically flat, and constructed a plan for a double track line from Selby to Hull, with minimal conflicts with existing structures outside the two towns. The estimated cost, including rolling stock was £340,000.

On 11 August 1834 the Hull and Selby Railway Company was formed, and the process of obtaining an act of Parliament authorising its construction was begun in late 1834.

Hull and Selby Railway Act 1836
- Act of Parliament
- Parliament of the United Kingdom
- Long title: An Act for making a Railway from Kingston-upon-Hull to Selby.
- Citation: 6 & 7 Will. 4. c. lxxx

Dates
- Royal assent: 21 June 1836

Text of statute as originally enacted

The proposed line passed through the land of Robert Raikes (of Welton) who opposed the plan in both the House of Commons, and the House of Lords; (Note: An alternative route passing through Cottingham, East Riding of Yorkshire was considered which would have required a tunnel through the Yorkshire Wolds at Wauldby; on the advice of U. A. Rastrick the alternative route via Hessle and Welton was chosen.) the Hull Corporation also raised objections, claiming the right to all development land along the Humber foreshore at Hull. Accommodation was made with both and the bill received royal assent on 21 June 1836 as the Hull and Selby Railway Act 1836 (6 & 7 Will. 4. c. lxxx). (Note: "An Act for Making a Railway from Kingston-upon-Hull to Selby." (Cap.80, 21 June 1836))

A petition to prevent the line operating on Sundays was rejected by the House of Commons. The act authorised the line and allowed £400,000 to be raised from share issues and £133,333 from loans.

==== Description of the line ====
... no line in England of similar extent is better adapted for the formation of a Railway

— House of Commons Committee, 1836.

From Selby, the line connected from the Leeds and Selby Railway, and ran NNE crossing Ousegate, and the River Ouse by a bascule bridge, (Note: 53.78404°N 1.06213°W Selby bascule bridge (1840)) before turning right on a curve approximately 1/2 mile (800 m) radius to head roughly eastwards in a gradually southward course. The line then ran roughly straight for 18 miles (29 km) passing the villages of Cliffe to the north, the crossing the River Derwent, and passing Wressle just north of St John's Church. Eastrington and Gilberdyke were then passed to the south, and crossed the Market Weighton Canal. After passing through Brough the line then curved slightly left at skirting North Ferriby's southern edge. It then passed through Hessle Cliffe, across Hessle Haven, (Note: 53.71882°N 0.43413°W Hessle Haven / Fleet drain bridge) then passed south of Hessle, it then ran towards Kingston upon Hull on a route alongside the bank of the Humber Estuary. The line terminated at a station near Manor House street in central Hull, (Note: 53.73909°N 0.33878°W Manor House Street station) directly west of and adjacent to the Humber Dock, and south of Kingston Street. The total length was around 30.65 miles (49.33 km). There were intermediate stations at Cliff, (Note: 53.78192°N 0.99607°W Cliff station (later Hemingbrough) Howden, (Note: 53.76469°N 0.86048°W Howden station) Eastrington, (Note: 53.75524°N 0.78734°W Eastrington station) Staddlethorpe, (Note: 53.74800°N 0.73179°W Staddlethorpe (later Gilberdyke) station) Brough, (Note: 53.726940°N 0.57873°W Brough station) Ferriby, (Note: 53.71707°N 0.50777°W North Ferriby station) and Hessle. (Note: 53.71753°N 0.44133°W Hessle station) Wressle railway station came into use during the 1840s and 50s. (Note: 53.77298°N 0.92440°W Wressle station) (Note: Wressle Railway Station was not open in 1840, but came into use in the next two decades. See Wressle railway station)

The terrain to be covered was sufficiently level and open for the line to be built with gentle curves and few embankments, the steepest gradient being 1 in 240, and 9.63 miles (15.50 km) was completely level. The need for the crossings of the Ouse and Derwent to be made at a sufficient height necessitated the introduction of the steeper gradients on the line. The main civil engineering works for the line were cuttings at North Ferriby and Hessle, and the Humber side embankment on the route into Hull. Three bridges were of note: a bascule bridge over the Ouse at Selby, and cast iron bridges over the Derwent, (Note: 53.77350°N 0.92927°W Wressle railway bridge (River Derwent)) and Market Weighton Canal. (Note: 53.74256°N 0.68985°W Market Weighton Canal bridge)

There were water stations at Hull, Selby and Staddlethorpe. In addition to the goods and passenger facilities at the Hull terminus the company had a wharf nearby at Limekiln Creek. (Note: 53.7368°N 0.3424°W Hull and Selby Railway, Limekiln Creek warehouse)

==== Construction ====
The company's shares were fully taken up by November 1836, allowing the directors began to make contracts for the work; Walker was directed to stake out the line, which was completed before the end of the year.

Contracts for the bascule bridge over the Ouse (Mr. Briggs, foundations; Butterley Iron works, ironwork), and for the Market Weighton bridge and embankments (Mr. Pratt, civils; Marshall and Co. of Derby, ironwork) were let by September 1837; orders for iron rails were also made. The contracts for the 7 miles of line between Dairycoates and Melton (Townsend and Hacker) and 9 miles from the bridge on the Market Weighton Canal and the River Derwent (Mr. Charles Faviell) were made at the end of 1837. Work had begun on the foundations the bridges on the Market Weighton Canal and Ouse by the beginning of 1838. By March 1838 the foundations and associated embankments were partially completed.

The company held its second general meeting on 24 February 1838 by which time most of the cases of land compensation had been settled, and John Timperley was appointed resident engineer, under the principal engineers Walker and Burgess. In May contracts for the line and embankments on the route out of Hull to Dairycoates along the Humber foreshore were given to Mr. Charles Faviell. The remaining contracts for the 6 mile section from Melton via Brough to the Market Weighton Canal bridge (Pratt and Fenton), and the 6 mile section from the River Derwent to the junction with the Leeds and Selby Line (Mr. Briggs, civils, bridge foundations; Pim and Co., of Hull, Derwent bridge ironwork) were let in mid 1838. In July the original contract for the Hull Humber embankment was cancelled due to unsatisfactory progress and relet to Townsend and Harker.

By end of 1838 work was underway or nearing completion along the entire line; with the Market Weighton Canal and Selby bridge foundations complete and under preparation for the installation of the ironwork; the Derwent bridge foundations were underway; (Note: The bridge was delayed on the decision of whether a fixed bridge could be used. The design of the bridge was decided by an arbitrator, who decided that an opening bridge was not necessary, and allowed a fixed bridge, with the railway directed to pay £160 for the improvement of the river navigation.) the cuttings at Hessle and Ferriby were also under progress. Further orders for iron rails were made bringing the amount ordered up to 5,000 tons, a contract with the Leeds and Selby for the supply of stone ballast was also made. Spoil from the cutting at Hessle, up to 230,000 cubic yards (180,000 m^{3}) was used both on the Humber embankment and to ballast the line, ballast was also found on the land of Captain Shaw near Brough. At Brough removal of a mound revealed Roman remains including coins, pottery and a large amount of bones of cattle, as well as seven human skeletons.

By early 1839 plans for the railway depot, workshops and related equipment were being drawn up; the company acquired tanks for kyanising sleepers were acquired, and an order placed with Bereton and Vernon of Hull for a 10 horsepower (7.5 kW) steam engine to power machinery at the Hull workshop, including that for sawing the wood for sleepers. By July the Humber embankment near Hull was complete, and the Hull depot, station and offices were under construction; much of the civil work of the rest of the line was complete, including the Market Weighton Canal bridge, with the superstructures of the Derwent and Ouse bridges in preparation for installation. Much of the line was in the process of being ballasted, and the kyanising of sleepers for the track had begun. Of the main building works only the contracts for station houses remained to be awarded.

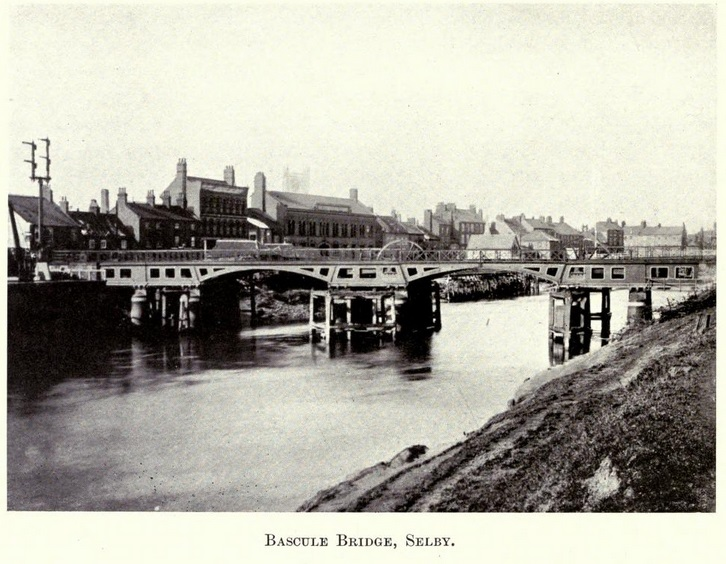
The bascule bridge on the Ouse at Selby

The Ouse bridge was required by the Hull and Selby Railway Act 1836 to have an opening arch of 44 feet (13 m), whilst the Ouse at Selby was nearly 200 ft in width, with an underlying geology consisting of silt, quicksand and then hard clay. The bridge consisted of two main spans, one opening; plus sections on either side from land to the first pier and to the second pier, and a section across the central piers. Each span consisted of six 1.5 in (38 mm) cast iron longitudinal ribs, with one rib under the line of each rail and two outer ribs on either side under a handrail. 0.875 in (22.2 mm) cast iron plates covered the ribs; the track ran on timber bearers 12 by 6 in (300 by 150 mm) wide by deep. The opening mechanism was operated by man power using a geared drive with a hand wheel of 9 ft (2.7 m) giving a mechanical advantage of 285.

The contractor Mr. Briggs installed the river bank, sided and central pier piled foundations between autumn 1837 and June 1839. Stone piers were constructed on solid ground 40 ft (12 m) inland of the abutment piers, and the abutment piers connected by tie rods to them to prevent them moving with any slippage of the river banks. Castings from the Butterley works arrived in September 1838 and the opening span was closed and the lifting spans installed between 11 October 1839 and 13 February 1840. The closed span was installed and the bridge completed by the end of March 1840.

On the west bank of the Ouse at Selby the new connection with the Leeds and Selby Railway required the construction of a new railway station (see Selby railway station), the old station was retained for goods use. (Note: For the history of the stations at Selby see Selby railway station.)

Both the Derwent and Market Weight Canal bridges were constructed with 70 ft (21 m) cast iron spans. In addition to the main bridges there were a number of other bridges, culverts, accommodation bridges, and other works including a bridge over Hessle harbour (haven).

The costs of developing the line were approximately: £106,000 for land purchase and compensation; £142,000 to contractors for the construction of the line and buildings; £42,000 on rails, chairs etc. and £35,000 on sleepers etc.; £5,000 on fencing etc.; around £4,700 was spent on rolling stock including engines; over £31,000 was expended on legal, engineering, surveying and management fees, plus general expenses relating to the promotion of the line through parliament, office costs, and employees salaries. Another £3,800 of expense was incurred on interest on loans, giving a total of just under £370,000 (as of 29 February 1840).

By May 1840 an entire length of track had been finished and on the 30th the directors of the company were able to travel from Hull to the junction at Selby. The second track was half complete and the railway buildings at Hull and Selby and on the line were approaching completion. The railway was formally opened on 1 July 1840.

==== Track ====
The track gauge was 4 foot 8½ inches, (Note: Tomlinson states the track was ½" broader at 4'9" to allow greater wheel movement.) intentionally to match that of the other Liverpool-Hull lines and that of the London-Birmingham and North Midland railways. The track consisted of track constructed of both laterally and longitudinally laid sleepers of which two thirds was longitudinal track. The sleepers were kyanised.

The rails consisted of flat bottomed ('web footed') rail secured by 7" oak keys. The longitudinal track consisted of Baltic half timber bearers connected by cross sleepers. Rails 2¾" deep of 55 lb per yd rail were used on the longitudinal track embedded in saddles 12" long which were secured to the sleepers. The cross-sleepered track used rails 3¾" deep weighing 63 lb per yd, fixed in 12" by 5" chairs.

The longitudinal track (see also Ladder track) was noted to produce smooth running and low wheel wear. However the contact between rail and sleeper produced hydraulic pumping in wet conditions, which led to rolling stock becoming dirtied very quickly. The longitudinal track was also found cause issue with wheel slip in frosty weather. No longitudinally laid track remained on the line after 1860.

==== Rolling stock ====
Locomotives

John Gray was the locomotive superintendent from 1840 to 1845. His designs such as the "Star" and "Vesta" were fitted with variable expansion valve-gear, and his engines on the railway represent some of the earliest examples of counterweighting of wheel rims on locomotives.

Contracts for an initial six locomotives from Fenton, Murray and Jackson were signed in April 1838. They were of a design similar to that already in use on the Leeds and Selby line. (Note: Named Collingwood, Andrew Marvel, Wellington, Exley, Kingston, and Selby.) In 1842 locomotive power consisted of twelve six-wheeled engines; a second set of six were ordered from Shepherd and Todd to a revised design: a broad wheelbase of 11 feet (3.4 m) and lateral spring spacing of 6.5 feet (2.0 m), along with a centrally located driving crank was employed to increase safety by reducing oscillations at speed; the design was simplified to two inner frames supporting the inner bearings creating more space in the inside frame, in order to facilitate ease of maintenance; expansive working of steam was employed for fuel efficiency; the remainder of the design was influence by contemporary best practice – 6 feet (1.8 m) driving wheels, pistons of 2 by 1 foot (0.61 by 0.30 m) stroke by diameter, and a firebox 2 by 3.5 feet (0.61 by 1.07 m) with 94 fire tubes each 9.5 ft (2.9 m) long and 2 in (51 mm) diameter.

The original six engines had issues with sparks and cinders from the chimneys which required remedial alterations. A test was performed comparing the performances of the original, modified, and revised designs under the inspection of engineers from Fenton, Murray and Jackson; Shepherd and Todd; and the Hull and Selby: the modified and revised showed significant increases in fuel efficiency, with the revised design using less than half of both coke and water: 0.271 and 1.62 lbs respectively per ton-mile, vs 0.611 and 3.90 lbs per ton-mile for the original engines; resulting in working costs reduced by a related amount.

Locomotive list
Name	Wheels	Builder	Date introduced	HSR no.	YNMR no.	NER no.	Comments
Kingston	?	Fenton, Murray and Jackson	1840		67	293	
Exley	?	Fenton, Murray and Jackson	1840		52		
Selby	?	Fenton, Murray and Jackson	1840		58	278?	
Collingwood	?	Fenton, Murray and Jackson	1840		68	305	
Andrew Marvel	?	Fenton, Murray and Jackson	1840		59	279	
Wellington	?	Fenton, Murray and Jackson	1840				
Star	2-2-2	Shepherd and Todd	1840		53		
Vesta	2-2-2	Shepherd and Todd	1840		54		
Leeds	?	Shepherd and Todd	1840				
Hercules	0-6-0	Shepherd and Todd	1844				

Notes

1. HSR = Hull and Selby Railway
2. YNMR = York and North Midland Railway
3. NER = North Eastern Railway

Carriages and wagons

Other rolling stock consisted of 10 three compartment first class carriages; 20 second class; (ordered from Hustwick and Bean) and 6 third class carriages; plus there were also fifty goods wagons. Carriages were painted dark green.

==== Operations and management (1840–45) ====
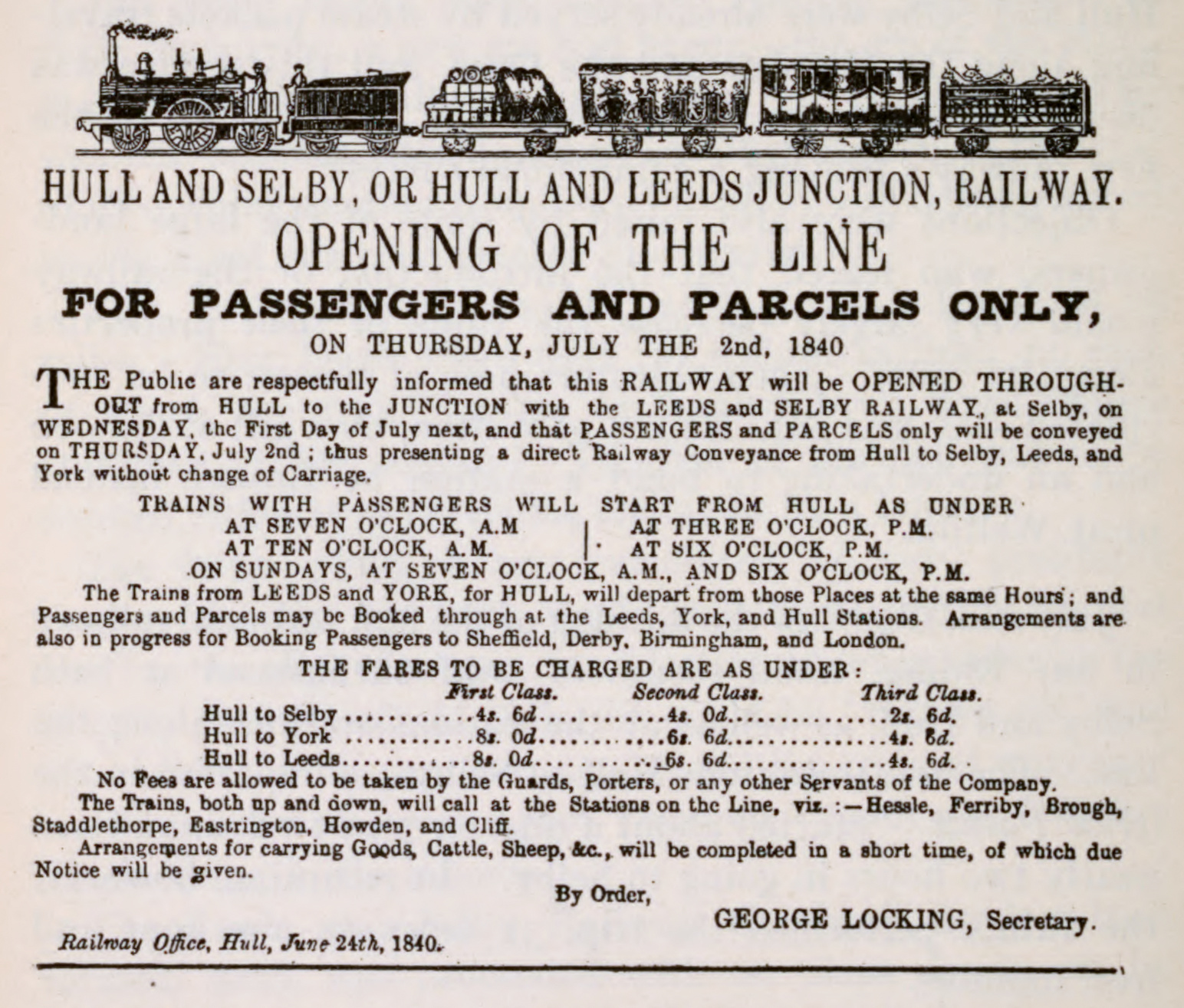
Notice on the opening of the line (1840)

The entire line was opened on 1 July 1840. A public procession in Hull was cancelled due to heavy rain; four trains left Hull for Selby, hauled by "Exley", "Andrew Marvell", "Kingston", and "Selby" built by Fenton, Murray and Jackson; the first departure was at 12:10 pm arriving in Selby at 2:15 pm. The return journeys were made from 4 pm, with a dinner held in the company's warehouse attended by Henry Broadley MP and chairman of the company, George Hudson, and others.

The line was immediately remunerative, giving a 2.5% dividend after 9 months of operation, and continued to return dividends to shareholders until it was leased by the York and North Midland Railway. Cost of travel (1842) was 1.76d, 1.56d, and 0.978d per mile for first, second and third class passengers respectively.

By 1840 the company had introduced incentive fares for visitors to the Hull market, allowing the purchasers of specific single tickets to return free of charge by a later train; the success of this scheme led to the return train being occupied by around 400 persons. The company began issuing cardboard tickets to simplify bookings in 1841.

In late 1843 the company formed a friendly working arrangement with the Manchester and Leeds Railway (M&LR), with joint working, and a potential future merger of the two companies. Joint working under one management began on 1 January 1844, with an approximately 1:5 split on future capital costs and of receipts, with the Hull company with the minor share. The companies were not able to present a bill in time to Parliament to formalise the merger, but continued to be worked as one company, with negotiations between the two continuing during 1844.

Two Hull and Selby shareholders disagreed with the arrangements with the Manchester company, and in 1844 began to agitate for a re-negotiation of the distribution of receipts between the two firms. Additionally shareholders with interests in the Hull Dock Company were concerned about the M&LR's plans to establish or improve docks at Wakefield and Goole. Other arrangements and schemes the M&LR entered into led the H&S shareholders to consider the amalgamation to no longer be advantageous, and in March 1845 the shareholders revolted against the Board of Directors and voted against amalgamation with the M&LR.

At that time the Hull and Selby Company was promoting a branch line from Hull to Bridlington, which had potential to conflict with or complement George Hudson's proposed line south from Scarborough to Bridlington. Hudson had also taken over the intermediate line, the Leeds and Selby Railway (in 1840), and had begun to operate shipping from Selby to Hull in competition.

These developments, the concerns of the Hull shareholders, and Hudson's desire to avoid strong competition from a rival company led to informal discussion on amalgamation between the two parties. An offer to amalgamate the Hull and Selby, York and North Midland Railway (Y&NMR), together with the Wakefield, Pontefract and Goole Railway, and the Leeds and West Riding Junction Railway (Note: A 'Leeds and West Riding Junction Railway Bill' was before Parliament in 1845, but was rejected at committee stage.) was made and met with favour with some shareholders. Shortly before a shareholder's meeting called to discuss the merger Hudson and the activist shareholders met unofficially and the terms of a lease of the line to Hudson's Y&NMR were communicated. In May 1845, the shareholders, having already voted against amalgamation with the M&LR, voted at a special meeting to lease the company in perpetuity to the Y&NMR; in conflict with the board who were seeking for the company to remain independent. The offer of a lease was immediately validated by the Y&NMR. The lease arrangement between the two companies included a guaranteed return equivalating to 10% of the share capital, and allowed the Y&NMR to acquire the entire company after five years lease at a rate of £112.10s for every £50 share.

Authorisation for the 31 miles (50 km) Bridlington branch of the Hull and Selby Railway was obtained in the Hull and Selby Railway (Bridlington Branch) Act 1845 (8 & 9 Vict. c. li), (Note: "An Act for making a Branch Railway from the Hull and Selby Railway to Bridlington, and for other Purposes relating to the Hull and Selby Railway." (Cap.51, 30 June 1845)) and came into effect on 29 June 1845 on the same day as the authorisation of the Y&NMR's Scarborough branch to Bridlington. The lease of the Hull and Selby to the Y&NMR came into effect on the 1 July.

=== York and North Midland period (1845–1854) ===
In late 1845 the York and North Midland Railway (Y&NMR) reached an agreement with the Manchester and Leeds Railway (M&LR) whereby the M&LR would become joint lessors of the Hull to Selby Line – as part of the agreement the two parent companies were to also co-operate on directly traffic through each other's lines; whilst the M&LR was to withdraw its support from the proposed Leeds and York Railway and York, Hull and East and West Yorkshire Junction Railway that could have become strong competitors to the Y&NMRs existing and proposed lines; the two parties were also to abstain from entering any other hostile alliances. (Note: An eleven point memorandum was signed by the companies' chairmen: George Hudson and Henry Houldsworth. See York and North Midland Railway (1849, pp. 6–7)) The terms of the agreement was ratified by the shareholders of the three companies between December 1845 and 4 May 1846.

At the time of the lease arrangement the Hull and Selby Company other branches under development; in February 1845 the shareholders had authorised surveys for a line from the Bridlington branch to York via Market Weighton and Pocklington, and had proposals for a line from Market Weighton to the main line of the Hull and Selby. After the lease came into effect the Y&NMR was approached by Beverley interests to persuade the Y&NMR to complete these lines; on 17 May 1845 the Y&NMR shareholders agreed to proceed with surveys for the line and its branch. (Note: The rival York, Hull and East and West Yorkshire Junction Railway led to the Y&NMR promoting of an act in 1845/6 for the Beverley-Market Weighton-York Line, as well as other railways in East Yorkshire. The section from York to Market Weighton opened in 1847, the remainder delayed. See York to Beverley Line)

Hull and Selby Railway Company's Purchase Act 1846
- Act of Parliament
- Parliament of the United Kingdom
- Long title: An Act for enabling the Hull and Selby Railway Company to lease and also to sell their Railway to the York and North Midland and Manchester and Leeds Railway Companies, or one of them; and to authorize the raising of additional Money by both or either of the last-mentioned Companies for those and other Purposes.
- Citation: 9 & 10 Vict. c. ccxli

Dates
- Royal assent: 27 July 1846

In July 1846 the lease and acquisition of the H&S by the Y&NMR and M&LR was approved by the Hull and Selby Railway Company's Purchase Act 1846 (9 & 10 Vict. c. ccxli). (Note: "An Act for enabling the Hull and Selby Railway Company to lease and also to sell their Railway to the York and North Midland and Manchester and Leeds Railway Companies, or one of them; and to authorize the raising of additional Money by both or either of the last-mentioned Companies for those and other Purposes." (Cap.241, 27 July 1846)) Under the terms of the act both companies had equal rights in the lease; the line was to be worked by the Y&NMR, with formation of a joint working committee later if the M&LR exercised that right. The lease was approved by the H&S shareholders on 20 August 1846, and by the M&LR shareholders on 9 September 1846, and by the Y&NMR shareholders on 14 September 1846.

The Hull and Bridlington Branch Line was opened in October 1846. The line ran from a junction at Dairycoates west of Hull, (Note: 53.72850°N 0.37433°W Dairycoates Junction) directly northward to Cottingham, then to Beverley, Driffield and Bridlington. A junction with a branch of the York to Scarborough Railway was made at Bridlington, connecting to the main line at Seamer, allowing a continuous travel from Hull to Scarborough.

The Hull and Selby Railway (Bridlington Branch) Act 1845 (8 & 9 Vict. c. li) had also sought powers to improve the network around the Manor House Street station; (Note: "And it is intended to apply for power [...] to enlarge and render more commodious the station, depot, yards, and premises of the said Hull and Selby Railway Company, at or near the terminus of the same-railway in South Myton Ward ..." "Notice". The London Gazette. No. 20399. 1 November 1844. pp. 3719–20.) the act allowed the laying of rails and working by human or horse power of track near the Humber Dock. The 1840s developments included replacement in 1846 of the original timber bridge over the Humber Dock entrance lock with a double leaf cast iron swing bridge (Wellington Street bridge). (Note: 53.73829°N 0.33675°W Wellington Street Bridge, Humber Dock) By the 1850s the dockside lines extended from the Humber Dock along the east and south sides of Junction Dock and The Old Dock, all connected to the rail network from a branch off the H&S Line west of Manor House Street station. Construction of a dock extension, the Railway Dock extending westwards from Humber Dock was begun in 1845, and opened in 1846; it also was connected to the rail lines of the H&S.

In 1847 the Y&NMR obtained the York and North Midland Railway (Hull Station) Act 1847 (10 & 11 Vict. c. ccxviii) giving permission to construct a new station in Hull, and 4.75 miles (7.64 km) of lines connecting it to the Hull and Selby Line and the Bridlington branch. (Note: "An Act for enabling the York and North Midland Railway Company to make a Station at Hull, and certain Branch Railways connected with their Railways and the said Station; and for other Purposes.", (Cap 218, 22 July 1847)) The station was opened in May 1848, and the original station retained for goods use. A new junction was made (Hessle West junction (Note: 53.72489°N 0.39400°W Hessle West Junction)) allowing running via the Bridlington branch into the new Hull Paragon station.

In 1848 a branch line from the Hull and Selby was built from Barlby just to the east of Selby to Market Weighton, connecting at Cliffe junction. (Note: 53.78737°N 1.03935°W Cliffe junction (Selby – Market Weighton Line))

In the enquiries into George Hudson's finances in the late 1840s it was found that he had sold his shares in the Hull and Selby to the Y&NMR at a higher price than he had paid for them; as a result he allowed this transaction was cancelled.

By 1850 the Lancashire and Yorkshire Railway (L&YR) (successor to the M&LR) had not taken up the lease, (Note: The York and North Midland Railway was paying all £66,000 of the yearly rent to the Hull and Selby Railway Company (£33,000 in the half yearly account).) and were claiming to be not liable in response to calls from the Y&NMR for them to take up joint responsibility for the line. In 1852 the Y&NMR and L&YR presented a bill to Parliament to clarify the leases and joint working arrangements on the Leeds and Selby and other lines. (Note: An Act to enable the Lancashire and Yorkshire and York and North Midland Railway Companies to enter into Arrangements as to the working and Management of Portions of their Railways (Cap. 96, 17 June 1852)) Despite the equal footing in the 1845 act the Y&NMR exclusively leased and worked the line up till its amalgamation with other railways to form the North Eastern Railway.

Acts of Parliament altering the terms of the share issue of the Y&NMR enabling it to hold shares in the Hull and Selby were obtained in the York and North Midland Railway Act 1850 (13 & 14 Vict. c. xxxviii), and the York and North Midland Railway Act 1853 (16 & 17 Vict. c. cix). (Note: "An Act to alter the Terms of Issue of the Shares in the Capital of the York and North Midland Railway Company, called the "Hull and Selby Purchase, &c. Shares;" to enable the said Company to hold Shares in the Hull and Selby Railway Company and in the Malton and Driffield Junction Railway Company; to alter, amend, and extend the Acts relating to the York and North Midland Railway Company; and for other Purposes." (Cap.38, 1850)) (Note: "An Act to authorize the Re-issue of certain of the Shares in the Capital of the York and North Midland Railway Company, called Hull and Selby Purchase, &c. Shares, and for other Purposes." (Cap.109, 1853))

In mid 1853 the Victoria Dock Branch Line was opened, making a connection to the Hull-Selby Line into Paragon station, Hull, north-east of its crossing with Anlaby Road.

=== North Eastern Railway period (1854–1923) ===
The North Eastern Railway (NER) was formed in 1854, following the downfall and disgrace of George Hudson due to his financial dealings. The North-eastern Railway Company's Act 1854 (17 & 18 Vict. c. ccxi) sanctioned the amalgamation of the York, Newcastle and Berwick Railway, Leeds Northern Railway, York and North Midland and other lines into a new company with a railway network of over 700 miles (1,100 km). The H&S initially opposed the merger, wishing to retain the favourable terms of the lease obtained from the Y&NMR under Hudson; the final act included clauses protecting their interests. The issue of the lease payments originally agreed with the Y&NMR and the M&LR led to a chancery suit being brought by the H&S; the Lancashire and Yorkshire Railway (successor to the Manchester and Leeds company) made an agreement with the H&S to retain their Hull traffic on the H&S Line, and the directors of the NER agreed to undertake the lease alone, resulting in the H&S terminating their suit.

At amalgamation the H&S was operating seven trains per day, at average speeds from 31 to 25 miles per hour (50 to 40 km/h). Passenger fares were 2.14, 1.75 and 1.17 pence per mile on first, second and third class tickets.

From 1862 onwards the Hull Dock Company constructed a series of docks along the banks of the Humber, south of the line into Manor House Street station, stretching as far west as Dairycoates; as part of the works the lines of the Hull and Selby required modification; additionally the Dock Company's wharfside lines were connected to external rail system, with the main junctions at Albert Dock junction west for the south quay of Albert Dock, (Note: 53.73014°N 0.36742°W Albert Dock junction west) and Albert Dock junction east for the north quay of Albert Dock; (Note: 53.73101°N 0.36387°W Albert Dock junction east) there were also junctions further west for St Andrew's Dock. The docks were completed c. 1869 Albert Dock; 1880 William Wright Dock; 1883 and 1897 St Andrew's Dock and its extension. In the same time period Dairycoates engine shed was established (1863) inside the triangle junction between Hessle, Dairycoates and Hessle Road junctions.

In 1863 the NER obtained the North Eastern Railway (Hull and Doncaster Branch) Act 1863 (26 & 27 Vict. c. ccxxxviii) allowing the construction of a line from Staddlethorpe on the Hull and Selby Line to Thorne, connecting to the South Yorkshire Railway's line from Thorne to Doncaster, (Note: 53.74855°N 0.73585°W Staddlethorpe junction) (Note: A broadly similar rival scheme had been proposed in 1845: the Hull and Barnsley Junction Railway, which aimed to connect the Hull and Selby at Howden to south Yorkshire, and the lines of the Manchester, and Sheffield. Despite representing a geographically favourable route it was completely opposed by George Hudson as it would have abstracted traffic from part of the H&S, which he had just obtained on generous terms.) with running powers shared between the two companies. Additional running power arrangements were made with the Lancashire and Yorkshire Railway on trains from Hull to south Yorkshire. The branch was completed in 1869. (See Hull and Doncaster Branch)

On 2 January 1871 the NER opened its York and Doncaster branch, consisting of two new sections of track, running briefly over the Leeds and Selby, and Hull and Selby lines at Selby. On the Hull and Selby, the new line turned north to York at Barlby junction; (Note: 53.78753°N 1.048598°W Barlby junction, initially a convergence of lines with no junction, later crossovers formed) the new line formed a new route for the East Coast Main Line. On 1 September 1871 the NER gave notice of its intention to end the lease of the H&S Line, and to purchase the company. The exchange of H&S shares for cash or NER preference stock was undertaken between 1871 and 1872, and the Hull and Selby Railway ceased to exist as an independent entity in 1872.

The Manchester, Sheffield and Lincolnshire Railway obtained running powers into Hull in 1873, and had a goods station, English Street goods station, (Note: 53.73793°N 0.34374°W MS&LR goods station, Kingston Street) built west of the NER's Railway Street goods station, connected to the mainline by 1.75 miles (2.82 km) of track. The station was built and operated by the NER for the MS&LR. The MS&LR began running trains into Paragon station from August 1873; the goods station opened in August 1879.

In the early 1870s increased traffic to Hull began to cause traffic jams, in part due to inadequate goods facilities; leading to local calls for an alternative railway into Hull. After much machinations and several failed schemes a rival line and dock opened in 1885 the Hull, Barnsley and West Riding Junction Railway and Dock Company, constructed primarily to compete for freight (coal) trade between Hull to south Yorkshire. (Note: The Hull, Barnsley and West Riding Junction Railway and Dock Company (HB&WRJR) later renamed as and commonly known as the Hull and Barnsley Railway; also Tomlinson (1915, pp. 703–707)) Opening of the new railway led to a rates war between the H&BR and NER, with the NER reducing their rate from 2s 2.75d to 1s 11.75d in 1886. The competition between NER, H&BR, and Hull Dock Company on dock and railway rates weakened the latter two financially to the extent that both began seeking amalgamations with the NER or other companies. In 1893 a bill was passed allowing the amalgamation of the Hull Dock Company into the NER. (Note: A clause in the 1893 act concerning the construction of a joint dock was taken forward as the Hull Joint Dock Act 1899 (62 & 63 Vict. c. ccxlii), allowing the construction of a new dock in the east of Hull. The dock was opened in 1914 as the King George V Dock) After acquiring the Dock Company the NER began improvements to the docks, St Andrew's Dock was expanded (1894), and in 1904 work began on a new wharf for the fruit trade, and for passenger steamers: the Riverside Quay which included its own passenger station was completed between 1907 and 1911. All the new works were rail connected from the Hull-Selby Line off its route into Humber Dock.

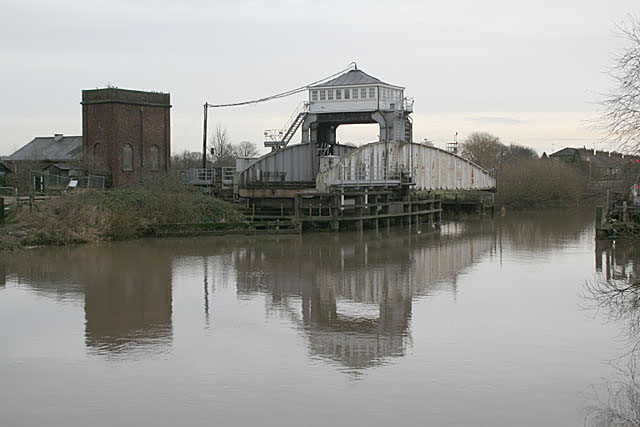
Selby swing bridge in open position, and hydraulic accumulator tower, left (2007)

As a result of the increased used and increased weight on the bridge across the Ouse a replacement railway bridge was built to the east of the original; (Note: 53.78435°N 1.06219°W Selby swing bridge (1891)) construction was contracted to Nelson and Co. of York, with hydraulic machinery from Armstrong Mitchell, and iron work and pier foundation sinking contracted to the Cleveland Bridge & Engineering Co., the bridge opened 1 February 1891. The cost of the bridge was over £22,342 18s 0d, or £30,948 13s inclusive of all works. The new bridge had a swinging span of 130 feet (40 m) and a fixed span 110 feet (34 m) with the swing span centre on the north bank of the Ouse. There were small approach bridges, one on the north bank and two on the south side, of which one on the south side form an underpass for a road ('Ousegate'). The bridge was turned by hydraulic engines, with the control cabin located above the tracks at the centre of the swing span. The tracks of the Hull and Selby and East Coast Main Line (York and Doncaster branch) were gauntleted (interlaced) from the east end of the bridge across to a point over the Ousegate underpass where they converged; (Note: The Hull and Selby, and York Doncaster (ECML) lines converged near Barlby, but did not form a junction until west the Ouse.) of the arrangement was made so that the junction could be controlled from a signal box on the Selby side of the bridge. Speed restrictions were 30 and 20 miles per hour (48 and 32 km/h) for passenger and goods trains respectively.

The works for the bridge at either river bank were of brick, masonry and concrete on 13-inch (330 mm) square pitch pine piles. The remainder of the bridge foundations consisted of cast iron piers fitted with cutting shoes sunk by excavation by hand labour working in airlocks, and by weighting. Piers for the swing span consisted of eight cast iron cylinders tapering from 6 to 4.5 feet (1.8 to 1.4 m) diameter from base to top which surrounded a ninth cylinder of 7 feet (2.1 m) base diameter; the 1.5 inches (38 mm) wall width cylinders were sunk to the level of sandstone bedrock at a depth of around 78 feet (24 m); after which they were filled with concrete. The central river pier had similar foundations of two 8 ft cast iron piers braced together. The swing span turntable consisted of 29-foot (8.8 m) diameter steel conical roller paths and bearings, supported on a circular 20-inch (510 mm) deep box girder in eight sections, with a twelve section box girder above, supporting the superstructure. The bridge turned about a central heavy cast pivot, with ties to the upper and lower box girders, and to the bearings. The bridge superstructure was constructed of wrought iron plate girders, with an asymmetric 'hogback' shape; the swing span extremities were 45 and 85 feet (14 and 26 m) from the centre line, with a 92.45-long-ton (93.93 t) counterweight; the maximum web depth was 14.5 feet (4.4 m). The fixed span was of similar, but symmetrical construction. The bridge was turned by the reaction of a rotating vertical shaft on a rack on the lower roller path. Power was supplied hydraulically from an accumulator (charged by steam engine power) near the railway station, via underground concentric pressure and return pipes in the central swing span pier – driving a pair of three cylinder hydraulic engines located in the cabin. Accumulators and steam engines were duplicated. The locking mechanism for the bridge was also hydraulically powered. As a consequence of the realignment of track resulting from the resiting of the bridge the station at Selby was also partially reconstructed.

In 1902 work began on widening the line between Hull and Staddlethorpe.

Melton Halt was opened in 1920, (Note: 53.71876°N 0.53260°W Melton Halt) for workmen's trains to the new works of the Humber Portland Cement Co. Ltd. (see Humber Cement Works).

=== London and North Eastern period (1923–1948) ===
The NER amalgamated with other railways to form the London and North Eastern Railway during the 1923 Grouping. In turn, the LNER amalgamated with other railways to form British Railways when the railways were nationalised in 1948.

In 1937 Capper Pass and Son opened a tin smelting works near Melton, adjacent west of the Humber Cement works; it was connected to the Hull and Selby Line by a junction near Melton Crossing.

=== British Railways period (1948–1995) ===
The Selby-Market Weighton Line closed in May 1965. Hemingbrough station closed in 1967. Melton Halt closed in 1989.

The Selby-York section of the York and Doncaster branch closed after the opening of the Selby Diversion of the ECML (1983); as a result of the new route the Selby swing bridge ceased to be crossed by ECML trains.

In the late 1970s Tilcon constructed a plant at Dairycoates, supplied with limestone by rail from Rylstone (Swinden Quarry, Grassington branch, Skipton). The works was connected by a sidings from the branch to Dairycoates shed and the west Dock.

=== Post privatisation period (1995–) ===
The Swing bridge at Selby was repaired in 2014, being closed from July to September; the work had been delayed from 2013 by the Hatfield Landslip.

In 2014 plans to electrify the line were given government funding to the planning stage; the electrification of the connecting Leeds and Selby Line having already been authorised. In March 2015 an electrification task force recommended the line as one of twelve lines of highest priority for electrification. Government funding for the electrification in Network Rail's Control Period 6 (2019–24) was announced in the 2015 United Kingdom budget, subject to a financial contribution from Hull Trains, and an acceptable business case being presented. In late 2016 the electrification proposal was rejected by the government.

== Accidents ==
A fatal accident occurred on 7 August 1840 (see Howden rail crash), which was one of the first to be investigated by the Railway Inspectorate. Four passengers were killed when a large casting fell from a wagon just behind the tender, and derailed the following carriages.

In late 1846 a mail train leaving Hessle collided side on with an engine parked in a siding too close to the main line, causing damage to the carriages and the derailment of one carriage.

On 21 February 1847 a mixed train from Hull left the track on a curve east of Hessle station resulting in two deaths and several injuries; the speed of the train, estimated at 30 to 45 miles per hour (48 to 72 km/h), and worn track of relatively weak strength (55 lb/yd) were cited as potential causes of the accident.

In 1850, the boiler of a locomotive exploded whilst it was hauling a freight train at Staddlethorpe station.

On 2 October 1880, Patrick Neary, an NER employee was hit by the Hull-Leeds express train whilst carrying out maintenance work of the bridge over the River Derwent at Wressle.

== Notes ==
=== Acts ===
Bridges over the River Ouse
Upstream: Selby toll bridge	Downstream: River Ouse swing bridge
