= Selby Line =

Railway line in Yorkshire, England

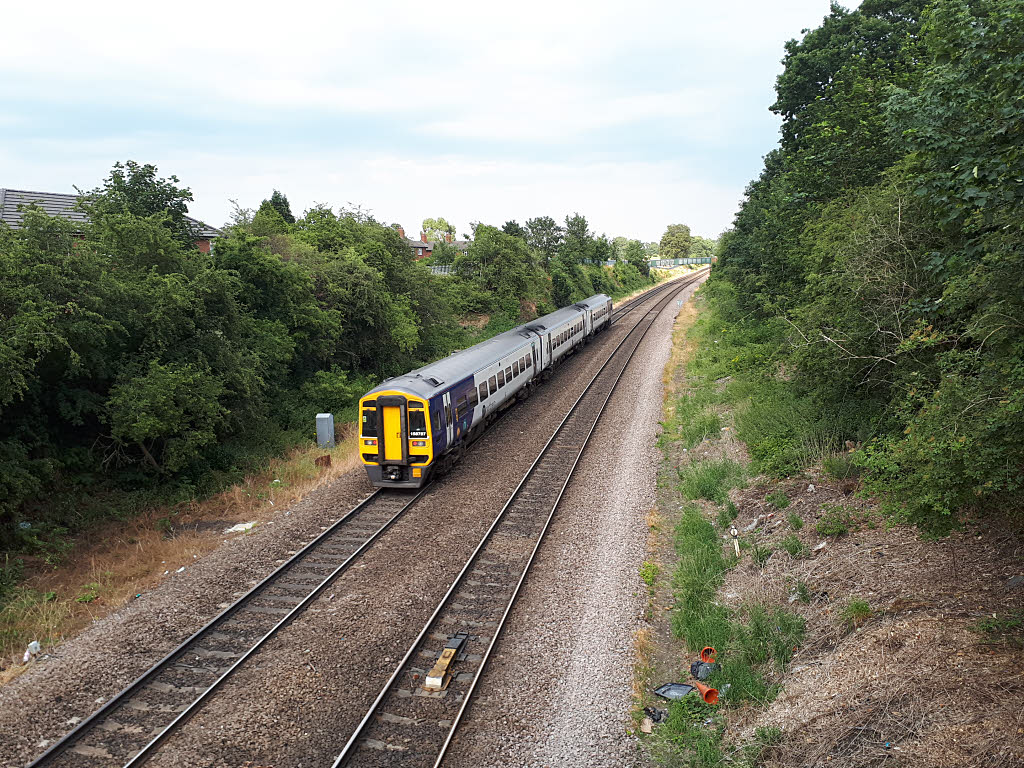
- A Northern Class 158 passing Halton near Leeds in 2018

Overview
- Status: Operational
- Owner: Network Rail
- Locale: Yorkshire
- Termini: Leeds; Hull
- Stations: 16

Service
- Type: Heavy rail
- System: National Rail
- Operator(s): Hull Trains; London North Eastern Railway; Northern; TransPennine Express

Technical
- Track gauge: 4 ft 8 1/2 in (1,435 mm) standard gauge
Route map
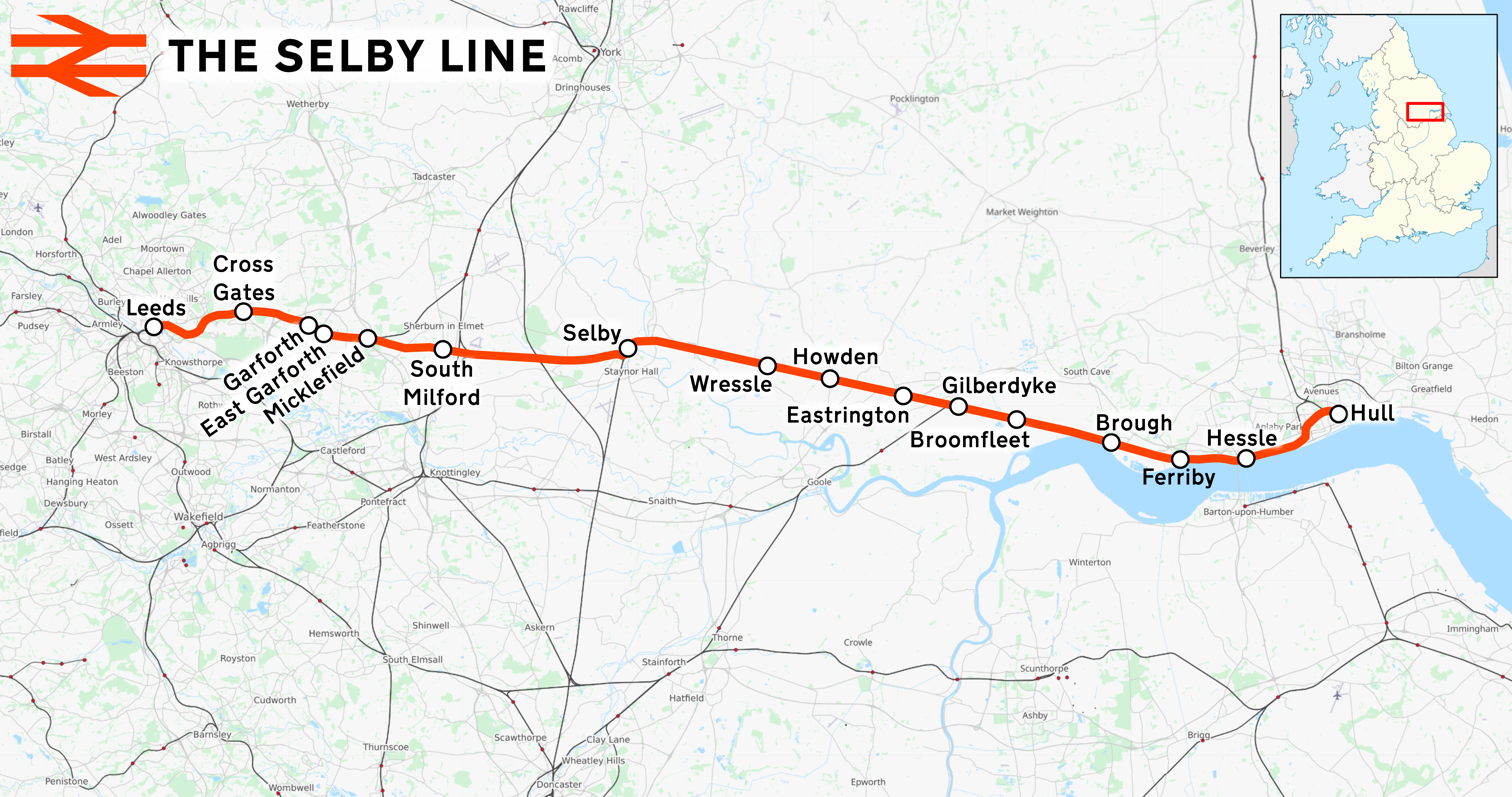
(Click to expand)

The Selby Line is a secondary railway line in Yorkshire, England, linking Leeds to Selby via Micklefield and then on to Kingston upon Hull (Hull). Hull Trains, London North Eastern Railway, and Northern and TransPennine Express operate passenger trains on the line.

In the second half of 2018, a 9.5-mile (15.3 km) stretch of line between Howden and Hessle had all its semaphore signalling and signal boxes decommissioned in favour of digital control overseen by the Rail Operating Centre in York. One of the crossing boxes at Crabley Creek has remained operational and worked by a Network Rail representative as the original deeds for the acquisition of the land by the railway company dictated that as long as the crossing existed, it should be staffed. Most of the boxes were either boarded up or demolished, though those at Melton Lane and Gilberdyke junction were retained as welfare facilities for railway workers.

== See also ==
- Hull and Selby Railway
- Leeds and Selby Railway
