= Hull Paragon Interchange =

Transport interchange in the East Riding of Yorkshire, England

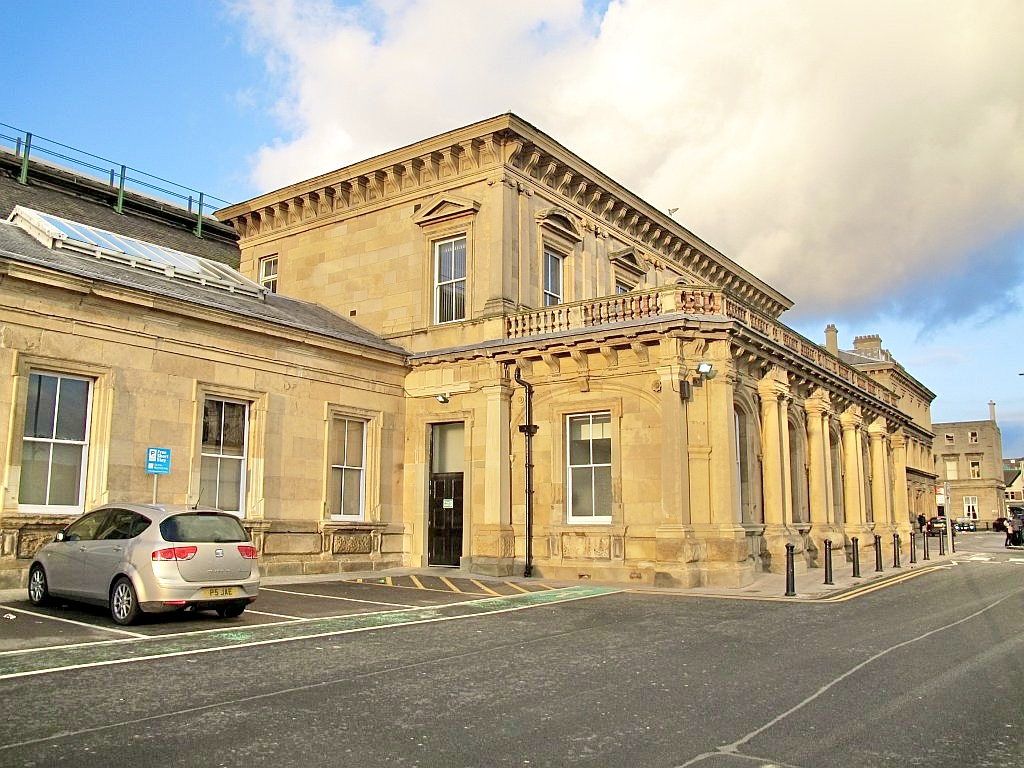
- The original station entrance

General information
- Location: Kingston upon Hull, England
- Coordinates: 53.7435°N 0.3460°W
- Grid reference: TA090287
- Manager: TransPennine Express
- Platforms: 7

Other information
- Station code: HUL
- Classification: DfT category B

History
- Opened: 1847

Passengers
- 2020/21: ▼0.538 million
- 2021/22: ▲1.993 million
- 2022/23: ▲2.383 million
- 2023/24: ▲2.640 million
- 2024/25: ▲2.908 million
Location
Notes
- Passenger statistics from the Office of Rail and Road

Hull Paragon Interchange serves the city of Kingston upon Hull, in the East Riding of Yorkshire, England. It is a transport interchange providing railway, bus and coach services. Opened in 2007, the station is currently operated by TransPennine Express, which provides railway services along with Northern Trains, Hull Trains and London North Eastern Railway.

The G.T. Andrews-designed station was originally named Paragon Station; together with the adjoining Station Hotel, it opened in 1847 as the new Hull terminus for the growing traffic of the York and North Midland (Y&NMR), leased to the Hull and Selby Railway (H&S). Along with routes to the west, the station was the terminus of the Y&NMR and H&S railway's Hull to Scarborough Line. From the 1860s, the station also became the terminus of the Hull and Holderness and Hull and Hornsea railways.

At the beginning of the 20th century, the North Eastern Railway (NER) expanded the train shed and station to the designs of William Bell, installing the present five-arched span platform roof. In 1962, a modernist office block Paragon House was installed above the station main entrance, replacing a 1900s iron canopy; the offices were initially used as regional headquarters for British Rail. A bus station was erected adjacent to the north of the station in the mid-1930s. The new interchange for the 21st century integrated the city's railway and bus stations under Bell's train shed.

== Toponymy ==
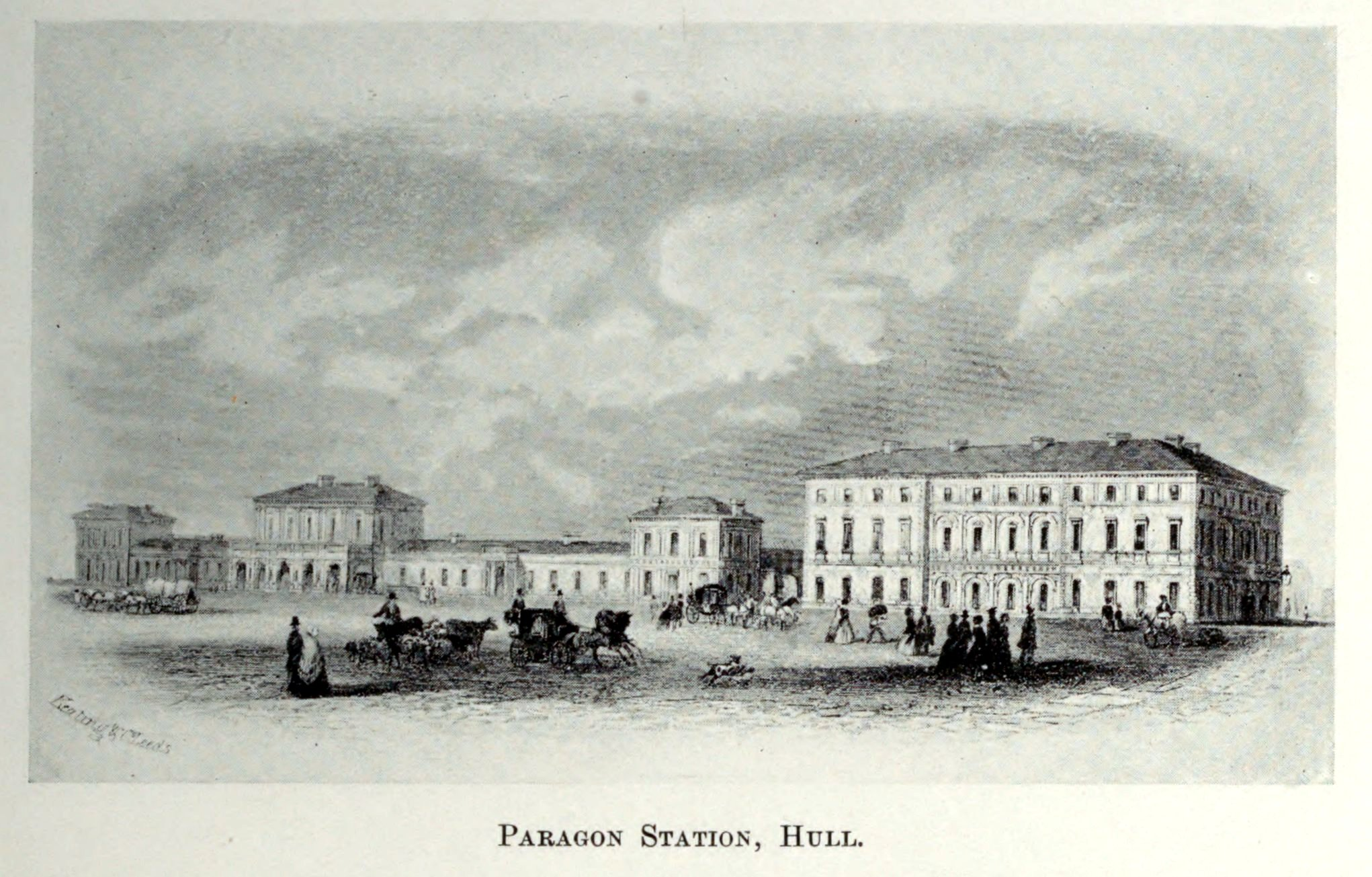
Early architect's impression of the proposed station and hotel design (south façade)

The railway station is commonly known as Paragon Station, Hull Paragon or just Hull Station; National Rail refers to the station as Hull (HUL). The name originates from nearby Paragon Street, which was itself built in c. 1802; the name dates back earlier. The Paragon Hotel public house, now the Hull Cheese, gave its name to the street and dates back as far as 1700.

The station was opened as Hull Paragon Street on 8 May 1848 by the York and North Midland Railway; the North Eastern Railway used the name Hull Paragon; however, the Paragon suffix was used inconsistently over 90 years from its opening to 1948. Since the British Railways period, which commenced in 1948, the official name has been Hull, which excludes the Paragon suffix. (Note: Since the closure of Cannon Street to passengers in 1924, the station was the only consistently timetabled rail terminus in the city.)

The term Hull (Paragon) has also been used by Network Rail. Since redevelopment in 2007, the official name has been Paragon Interchange; however, timetables continue to use Hull unless referring to bus services.

The hotel has been known as the Station Hotel or Royal Station Hotel from its early history; after privatisation in the 1980s, the owners renamed it Royal Hotel. As of 2014, as part of the Mercure Hotels group, its name is now the Mercure Hull Royal Hotel.

== History ==
=== Background ===
In 1840, the Hull and Selby Railway opened the first railway line into Hull, terminating at a passenger and goods terminal, Manor House Street station, adjacent to the Humber Dock, near the old town. Subsequently, the Hull and Selby Railway entered into working arrangements with the Manchester and Leeds Railway and then the York and North Midland Railway. In 1845, an act of Parliament enabled the York and North Midland and/or the Manchester and Leeds to take a lease of the company with an option to buy the line at a later date – only the York and North Midland was subsequently active. In 1846, the Hull and Selby completed its Bridlington branch which connected from a junction at Dairycoates near Hull to a line the York and North Midland was building from Bridlington to Seamer, connecting to its York to Scarborough Line, forming a railway route from Hull to Scarborough on the east coast. (Note: See also Hull and Selby Railway, Hull to Scarborough Railway.)

=== First railway station, hotel and branches (1848) ===
York and North Midland Railway (Hull Station) Act 1847
- Act of Parliament
- Parliament of the United Kingdom
- Long title: An Act for enabling the York and North Midland Railway Company to make a Station at Hull, and certain Branch Railways connected with their Railways and the said Station; and for other Purposes.
- Citation: 10 & 11 Vict. c. ccxviii

Dates
- Royal assent: 22 July 1847

Text of statute as originally enacted

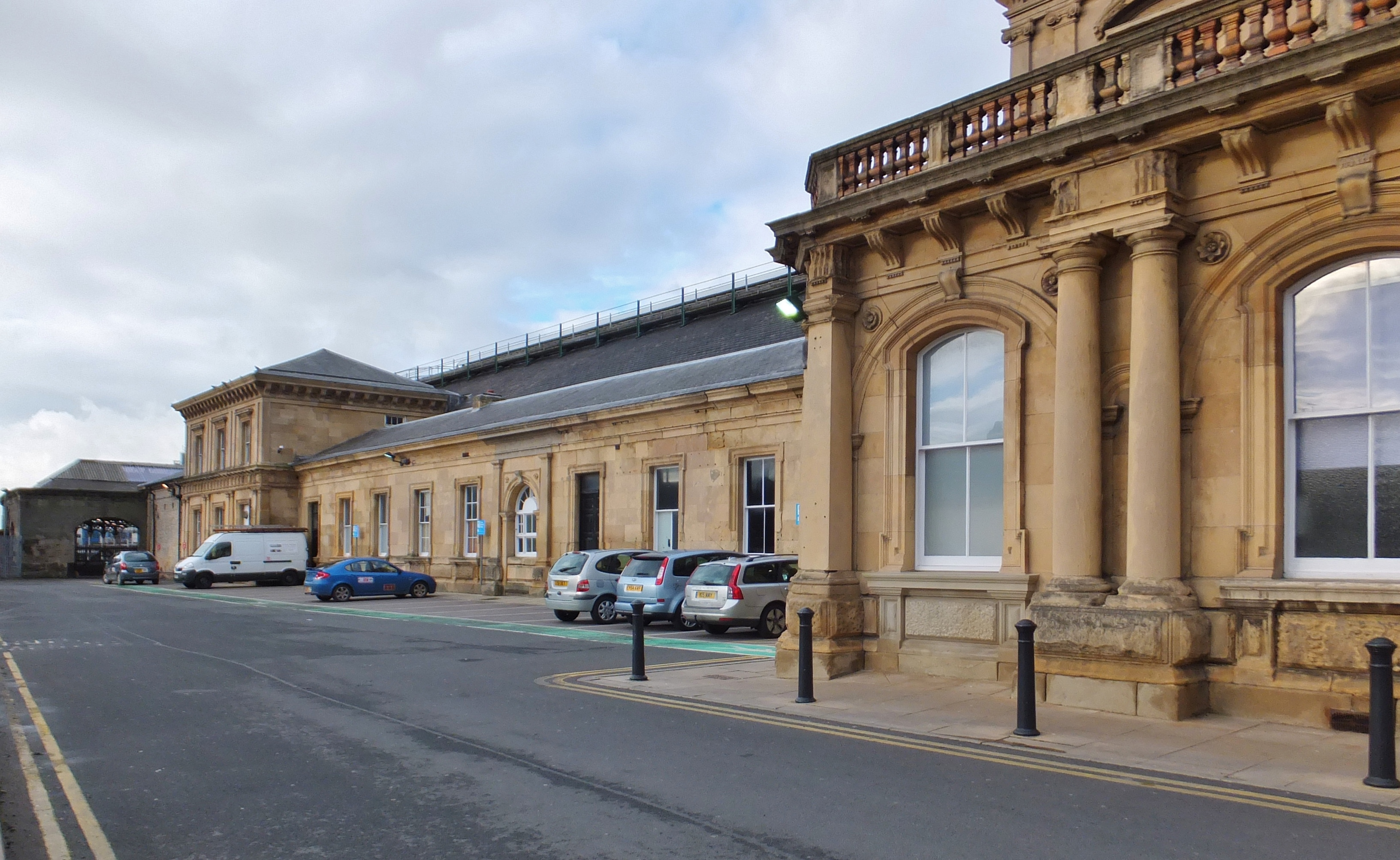
The original southern entrance range (2014)

In 1846, the York and North Midland and Manchester and Leeds railways began proceedings to create a new terminal station and connecting branch line in Hull. The York and North Midland Railway (Hull Station) Act 1847 (10 & 11 Vict. c. ccxviii) was subsequently passed. (Note: "An Act for enabling the York and North Midland Railway Company to make a Station at Hull and certain Branch Railways connected with their Railways and the said Station; and for other Purposes" (10 & 11 Vict. c. ccxviii, 22 July 1847))

The new station had the advantage of being better situated for travellers and allowed the old station to be used exclusively for freight traffic. In addition, the Hull and Selby company were keen to attract the investment in a new station from the leaseholders, as the capital investment was likely to increase the permanence of the relationship with the lessors.

The branches to the station were constructed off the Bridlington branch: a branch turning north-east close to the line's crossing of the Hessle Road; (Note: 53.73323°N 0.38191°W, Hessle Road junction (North)) and a branch turning south-east at 'Cottingham Junction' near to Haverflatts farm; (Note: 53.75616°N 0.39174°W, Cottingham junction (1848)) the two branches met at a junction roughly 0.5 miles (0.8 km) west of the new station. In addition, a new connecting chord was made from the Hull and Selby Line, (Note: 53.72460°N 0.3952°W, Hessle West junction (1848)) to the Bridlington branch, (Note: 53.73276°N 0.38184°W, Hessle Road junction (1848)) allowing direct through running from the west into the new station. The station was located on the western edge of the growing Georgian town and took its name from Paragon Street.

Construction contracts had been signed by early 1847, before the bill had been formally passed. (Note: Fawcett (2001, p. 84) states 1 April 1847, whilst Hitches (2012) gives 1 March 1847) The station opened in 1847 without any notable ceremony. The station and hotel were both in the Italian Renaissance style, with both Doric and Ionic order elements; the facades show inspiration from the interior courtyard of the Palazzo Farnese. The main station building was aligned east–west, south of the tracks, facing onto Anlaby Road; a two-storey centrally located booking hall was entered via a small porte-cochère, (Note: 53.743651°N 0.346715°W, Station entrance (1853)) and flanked by eleven bay wide single storey wings, with two storey three bay buildings on either end, one a parcels office, the other the station master's house. The train shed contained five tracks and two platforms, each 30 feet (9.1 m), covered with a three span iron roof. (Note: 53.743996°N 0.346797°W, Paragon station (train shed)) The station site was nearly 2.5 acres (1.0 ha). (Note: Sheahan (1864, p. 572) gives ground dimensions of 153 by 125 feet (47 by 38 m) long by wide for the station, which appears erroneous based on the 1856 Ordnance Survey 1:1056 town plans.)

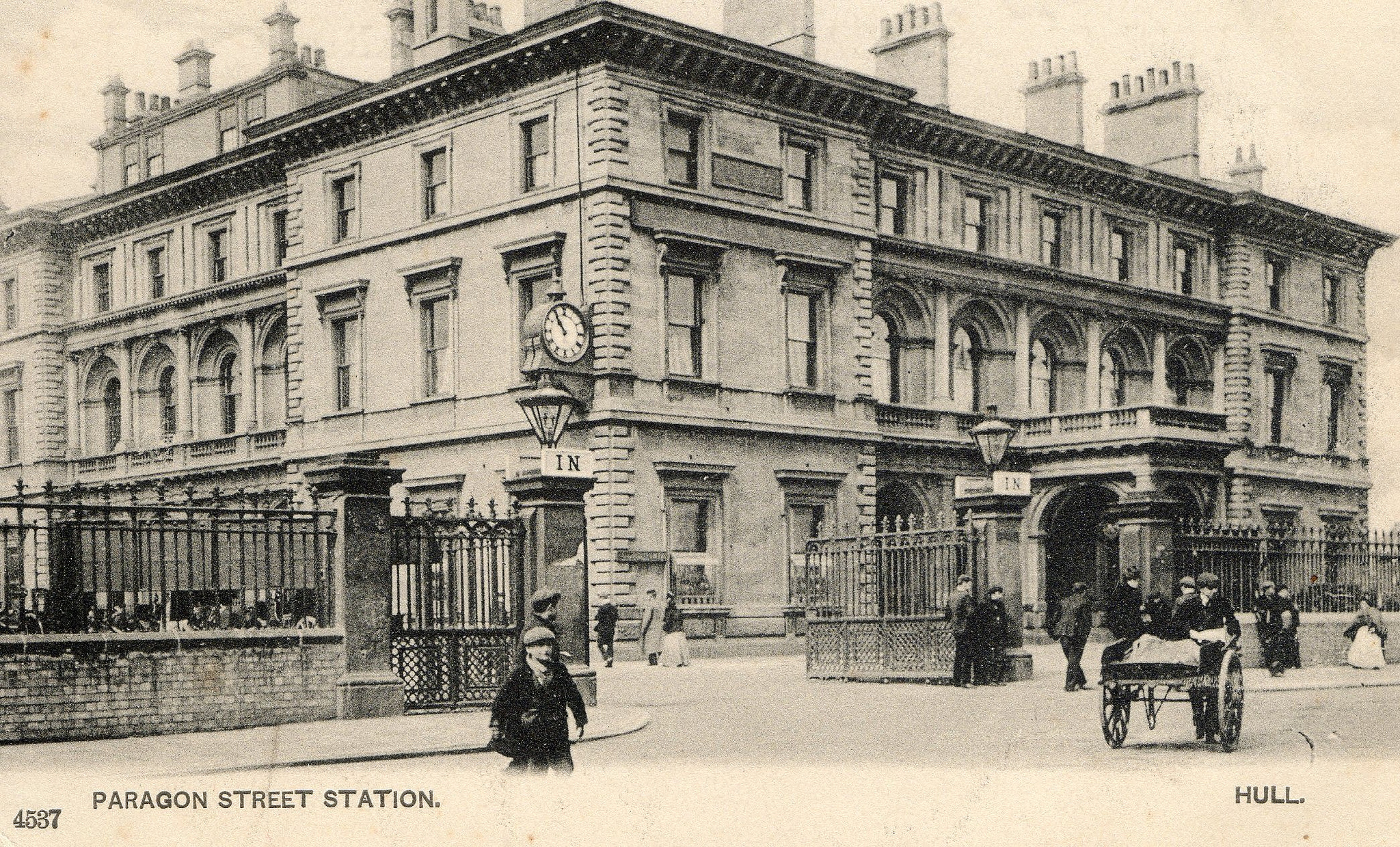
Station Hotel, with original porte-cochère entrance

The hotel was in a similar style to the station, located at the east end of the station with its main façade and entrance facing east. (Note: 53.744003°N 0.345469°W, Station Hotel) It was completed in 1849 as a three-storey building, nine bays wide, of area 120 by 130 feet (37 by 40 m). The centre of the building contained a 650 feet (200 m) square lightwell with ground glass roof.

Architect for both buildings was G.T. Andrews and represent his last major commission. The station and hotel were described by some contemporaries as "Hudson's Folly", who thought the scale of the development too great; the station was the largest built in England to that time associated with a railway station. By the time of completion of the station hotel, George Hudson, chairman of the York and North Midland was in disgrace after his fraudulent dealings had been discovered. The hotel's official opening ceremony took place on 6 November 1851.

Additional facilities at the station also included a locomotive house, on the west end of north side of the main shed; (Note: 53.744144°N 0.347765°W, Engine shed (c. 1850s)) a coal depot to the north-west; (Note: 53.744233°N 0.349335°W, Coal depot (original)) and a turntable. A new engine shed was constructed in the 1860s and a 20-engine shed was constructed in the mid-1870s. (Note: A square shed of approximately 150 feet (46 m) square had been constructed north-west of the original shed, south of St Stephen's church and square by the late 1800s. (Note: 53.744722°N 0.349337°W, Engine shed (c. 1880s), later site of coal depot))

In 1853, Queen Victoria visited the town and the use of the station hotel given to the corporation for the accommodation of the royal party; a throne room was created on the first floor and the royal household accommodated on the second. The royal party including the Queen, Albert, Prince Consort and five royal children arrived on the Royal Train on 13 October 1853 at Paragon Station. The visit concluded with a dinner at the hotel on 14 October.

=== NER period (1854–1923) ===
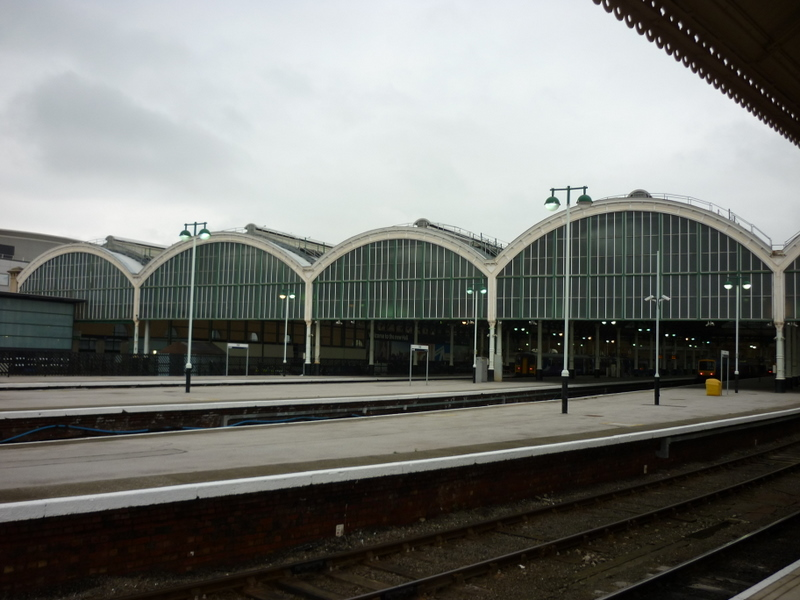
The 1904 train shed (2011)

In 1853, the Victoria Dock Branch Line had opened in Hull, connecting the Victoria Dock and a number of stations in Hull on a circular route around the outskirts of the town; the line connected to the existing network at junctions 0.5 miles (0.8 km) west of the station. This line was doubled in mid-1864 and brought more trains into Paragon: from the Hull and Hornsea Railway (opened 1864); and from the Hull and Holderness Railway (opened 1854) via a connecting chord to the Victoria Dock Branch Line. Further developments in the 1860s created additional or shorted routes into Paragon; the York to Beverley Line was completed in 1865 with the opening of the Market Weighton to Beverley section; the Hull and Doncaster Branch to south Yorkshire in 1869; and the line to Leeds extension was completed, extending the line from Hull to Leeds to the city centre, allowing through running westward.

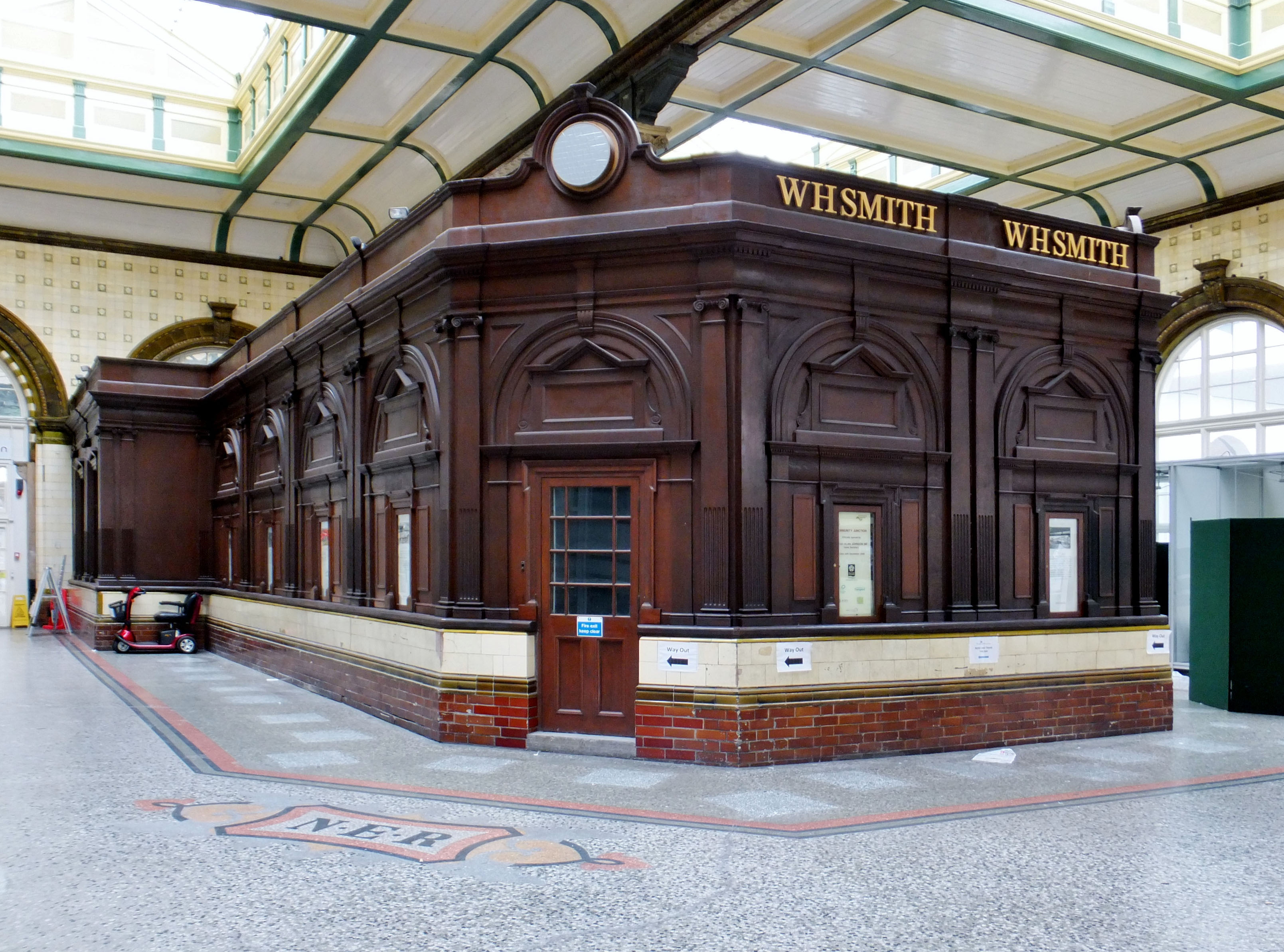
The entrance hall and booking office, with an inlaid NER mosaic floor monogram (2013)

In 1873, the Manchester, Sheffield and Lincolnshire Railway obtained running powers into Hull and passenger trains from that company running to Paragon from August. In 1898/9, the Hull and Barnsley Railway and the NER began work towards constructing a joint dock in Hull; (Note: See Alexandra Dock article.) as part of this co-operation between the two companies, the H&BR gave the NER running powers over its line in Hull, which the NER allowed the H&BR to run into and use Paragon station.

The growth of traffic was accommodated in the mid-1870s by adding a third middle platform to the train shed; the outer platforms were also lengthened beyond the shed and short bay platforms added on either side. The cross platform was widened at the expense of the length of the main platforms; the booking office and parcels offices swapped positions, and the middle portico walled up to create greater enclosed space. In 1884/5, the hotel was also expanded, adding room at first floor level by extending westward across a concourse entrance. In 1887, a station canopy was added over the ends of the departure (southside) platform that extended beyond the shed. (Note: The 1891 Ordnance Survey 1:500 OS Town plan shows the locations of the supporting columns.)

In addition to the standard facilities, the increased emigration to the United States in the 19th century led to the construction of an emigrant station, (Note: 53.743176°N 0.347835°W, Emigrant waiting rooms) south-west of the main station, in part due to concerns over public health dangers, such as cholera; the station also enabled more efficient handling of the large numbers of emigrants. The station rooms were built in 1871 to the designs of Thomas Prosser and was extended in 1881; due to its historical significance, the building is now grade II listed.

An extensive enlargement of the station was authorised by the NER board in 1897, as part of the extension programme the station's engine shed facilities were transferred to a new site at Botanic Gardens depot; (Note: The station's coal depot was resited to the site of the shed near St Stephens Square.) the transfer was complete by 1901 and, in 1902, work began on the rebuilding of the station; the expansion of the site was northwards towards Colliers Street, and required purchases and demolition of houses south of the street.

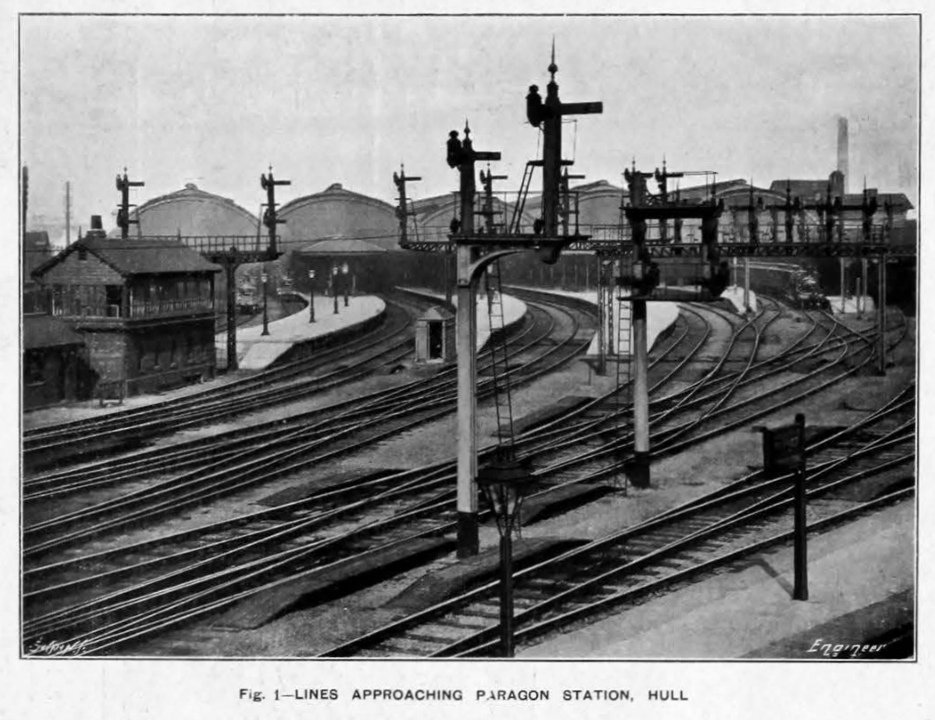
Hull Paragon c. 1908

The main station was enlarged to a design by NER architect William Bell. The extension included a new five span steel platform roof, with a two span roof over the concourse, built by the Cleveland Bridge & Engineering Co., with the offices resited to the east end of the station, facing the station concourse, together with the adjacent Hotel. Half of the new office spaces was taken up by a tiled booking office, with wooden booking windows, and architectural detailing in faience. (Note: 53.744455°N 0.345581°W, Ticket hall and entrance (1904)) The booking office's main entrance faced Paragon Square (Ferensway) accessed under a large iron made porte-cochère. (Note: 53.744478°N 0.345290°W, Iron entrance canopy (1904); Paragon House (1960); Paragon Interchange entrance hall (2007)) The enlarged station opened 12 December 1904. An additional range of buildings was built c. 1908 to the south-east of the station, to provide stock rooms for the hotel. (Note: 53.74367°N 0.34531°W, Hotel service building.) (Note: The diagram in Fawcett (2005, Fig.3.7, p.46) notes a bakery and stock rooms, whilst The Engineer & 11 February 1908, p.160, col.3) notes a motor garage and stock rooms. To the west and south of the 1848 front another building was built at around the same time (OS. 1:2500 1893, 1910/1).)

As built, the station had nine platforms under the four southernmost spans of the roof; the northernmost had facilities for special goods, such as cars and horses, and was screened off from the other four; it was served by platform 1, known as the fish dock or fish platform, which was also used for fish. The southern bay and 1887 platform roof was retained for a total of 14 passenger platforms; 1–9 also received low level roofs outside the main shed. The original station offices were retained and used as waiting rooms and parcel offices.

In 1904, the station signalling system was converted to an electro-pneumatic power signalling system – the station had two signal boxes: Paragon Station box was a 143 lever box and was located at the end of platforms 1 and 2; (Note: 53.744372°N 0.350409°W, Platform signal box (1904)) Park Street box, with 179 levers was located 714 feet (218 m) west of the station. (Note: 53.743920°N 0.351163°W, Park Street signal box (1904))

In the First World War, the station hosted a rest station and canteen for servicemen. On 5 March 1916, during a Zeppelin raid that killed 17, a bomb blast blew out the glass in the station roof.

=== LNER period (1923–1948) ===
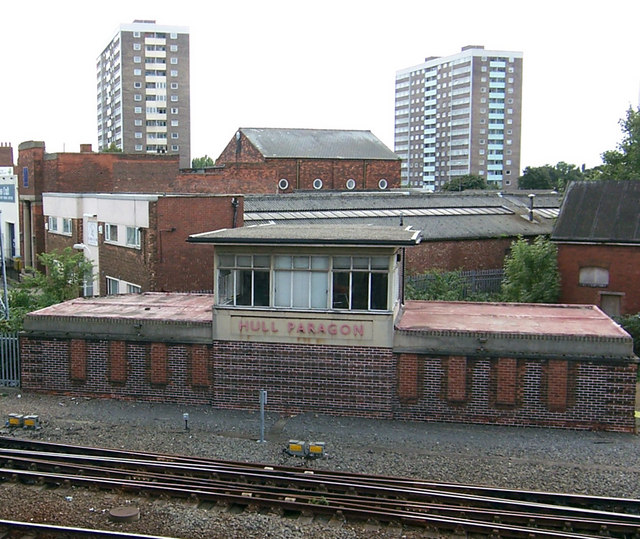
The 1930s signal box (2006)

From 1924, passenger trains running from the Hull and Barnsley Line became able to run into Paragon station, with the construction of a connecting chord between the NER and H&BR networks in north-west Hull. (Note: 53.75097°N 0.376421°W, Junction for chord to former Hull and Barnsley Railway) The H&BR's Cannon Street station closed in the same year. (Note: See also Hull and Barnsley Railway § "As part of the LNER (1923–1948)".)

On 14 February 1927, the Hull Paragon rail accident involved a head-on collision in which 12 passengers were killed and 24 seriously injured; it was caused by a signalling error.

In 1931–2, the hotel was internally revamped and expanded by the addition of an extra storey of rooms on the roof, replacing staff bedrooms; cement rendered wing was added on either side of the main entrance; an art deco entrance onto the station concourse was also installed. A railway museum was established by Hull Museums director Thomas Sheppard in the station in 1933.

In 1935, the decision was made to resignal the station and approaches, replacing the 1904 electro-pneumatic power signalling system with an electrically operated system. Park Street and Paragon station signal boxes were to be replaced with a single box; the running lines out of the station, including those controlled by the West Parade signal box, (Note: 53.745670°N 0.359604°W, West Parade signal box) were to be track circuited. (Note: "West Parade" a street between the Park Street and Argyle Street bridges; West Parade Junction was just east of Argyle street bridge, a double diamond crossover (1928), and the point were the Beverley, Hornsea, Withernsea and Selby lines diverged. "West Parade signal box" was just west of the junction and bridge (OS. 1:2500. 1928).) The system was an early British example of electrical interlocking. 48 points were controlled, using thumb switches in the signal box. Power supply was from the Hull Corporation at 400V 50Hz three phase, with a backup generator powered by a 28 horsepower (21 kW) Petter oil-engine. The main external system was electrified at 110V AC, with shunt signals at 100 or 55 V AC; the point motors, previously electro-pneumatically operated were retained, with a 50 cubic feet (1.4 m^{3}) per hour 80 pounds per square inch (550 kPa) max. pressure compressor system, duplicated for redundancy. Signalling was electric lamp backlit. The Westinghouse Brake and Signal Company Ltd was the main supplier of the equipment. A new signal box was installed, (Note: 53.744180°N 0.351776°W, Paragon Signal box (1938)) a LNER type 13, resembling in architectural design the Southern Railway's Streamline Moderne signal boxes, but with square corners.

During the Hull Blitz of 1941 the station received direct hits on the night of 7 May, with many incendiary bombs hitting the roof. The signal box was badly damaged when a parachute mine exploded nearby during the same night the station's small railway museum was destroyed by fire.

=== British Rail(ways) period (1948–1995) ===
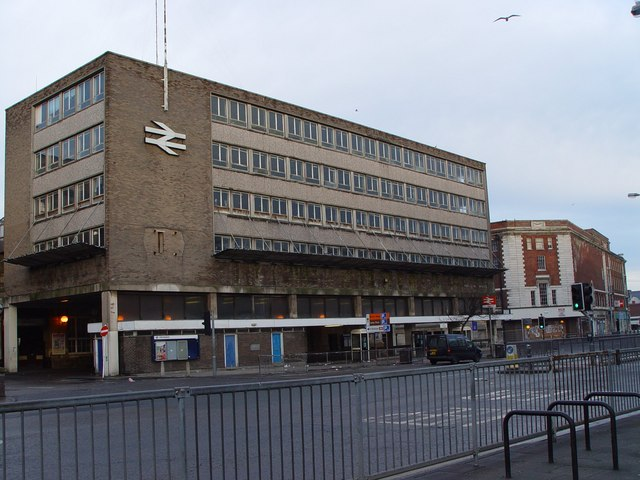
Station entrance with Paragon House above (2003)

The main entrance canopy was replaced by an office building, named Paragon House, in 1962. The building was originally used as a regional headquarters for British Rail, but was unused in later years.

In 1965, the Newington branch which had been used by trains running from west of Hull to Bridlington and beyond was closed and replaced by a new chord near Victoria crossing. (Note: 53.74736°N 0.36660°W, West Parade North junction) (Note: 53.74396°N 0.36701°W, Anlaby Road junction) The roofs sheltering platforms 1–9 outside the main shed were removed in the 1970s.

In the 1980s, a new travel centre (Note: A booking and information office.) was added on the station concourse. The body of the building was faced with light sandstone, with lighting via semi-circular arched windows and an approximately barrel roofed skylight. In the same period, a clerestory roofed waiting room was added at the head of the station platforms, an architectural homage to both Victorian train shed roofs and clerestory carriages.

After the privatisation of British Transport Hotels in the 1980s, the Royal Station Hotel was renamed Royal Hotel. In 1990, the hotel was gutted by a fire; the interior was rebuilt and the hotel reopened in 1992.

=== Post privatisation period (1995–present) ===
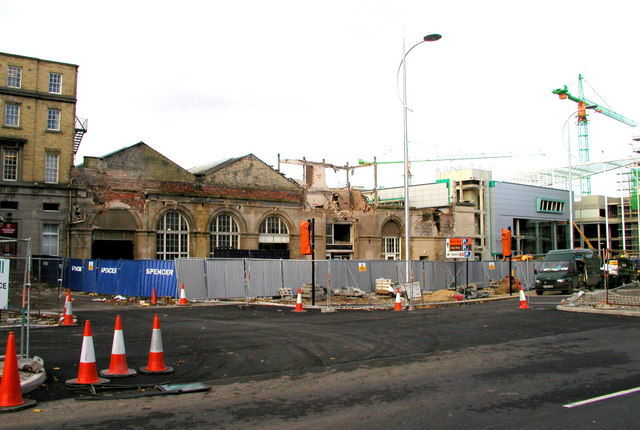
The station front during redevelopment, after the demolition of Paragon House (2006)

In 2000, outline planning permission was given for a transport interchange and shopping and leisure complex near Ferensway, Hull; in 2001, full planning documents were submitted for works on a 42-acre (16.8 ha) site included a new shopping arcade development incorporating a hotel and car parking facilities; a transport interchange incorporating the station; as well as landscaping, setting out of streets, a petrol station and a housing development. The development also included new facilities for the Hull Truck Theatre and the Albemarle Music Centre. The development is known as St Stephen's shopping centre. The interchange opened fully on 16 September 2007.

Features of the 2007 station redevelopment included a new canopy to the entrance; the Paragon House office block was demolished as part of the redevelopment. The former station booking office area was restored and, in 2009, opened as a community area. From 2009, a mobility scooter hire service was provided at the station. The interior of the booking office is used as a branch of WH Smith.

The rail concourse in 2026

The new transport interchange was officially opened by Queen Elizabeth II and the Duke of Edinburgh when they unveiled a plaque on 5 March 2009 after arriving at the station on the Royal Train.

A £65,000 bronze statue of Hull resident poet Philip Larkin by Martin Jennings was unveiled on the concourse of Hull Paragon Interchange on 2 December 2010, marking the 25th anniversary of the poet's death. The statue was located near to the entrance to the Station Hotel, a favoured watering place of the poet. In 2011, an additional five slate roundels containing inscriptions of Larkin's poems were installed in the floor around the statue; in 2012, a memorial bench was installed around a pillar near the statue.

In February 2017, a full-size model of the Gipsy Moth aircraft used by Amy Johnson to fly solo from Britain to Australia, created over a six-month period by inmates of Hull Prison, was put on display at the station. This remained throughout the City of Culture, but was moved to the adjacent St Stephen's shopping centre in March 2018. The station underwent a revamp during 2017, with a £1.4m investment, providing a new waiting area and more retail units.

In August 2023, a planning application was made by Network Rail to bring platform 1 back in to use.

In September 2024, TransPennine Express announced a £500,000 refurbishment of the toilet facilities, following a letter from Kingston upon Hull North's MP Diana Johnson, who described the situation as "unacceptably poor".

=== Bus and coach station ===
Hull Paragon Interchange
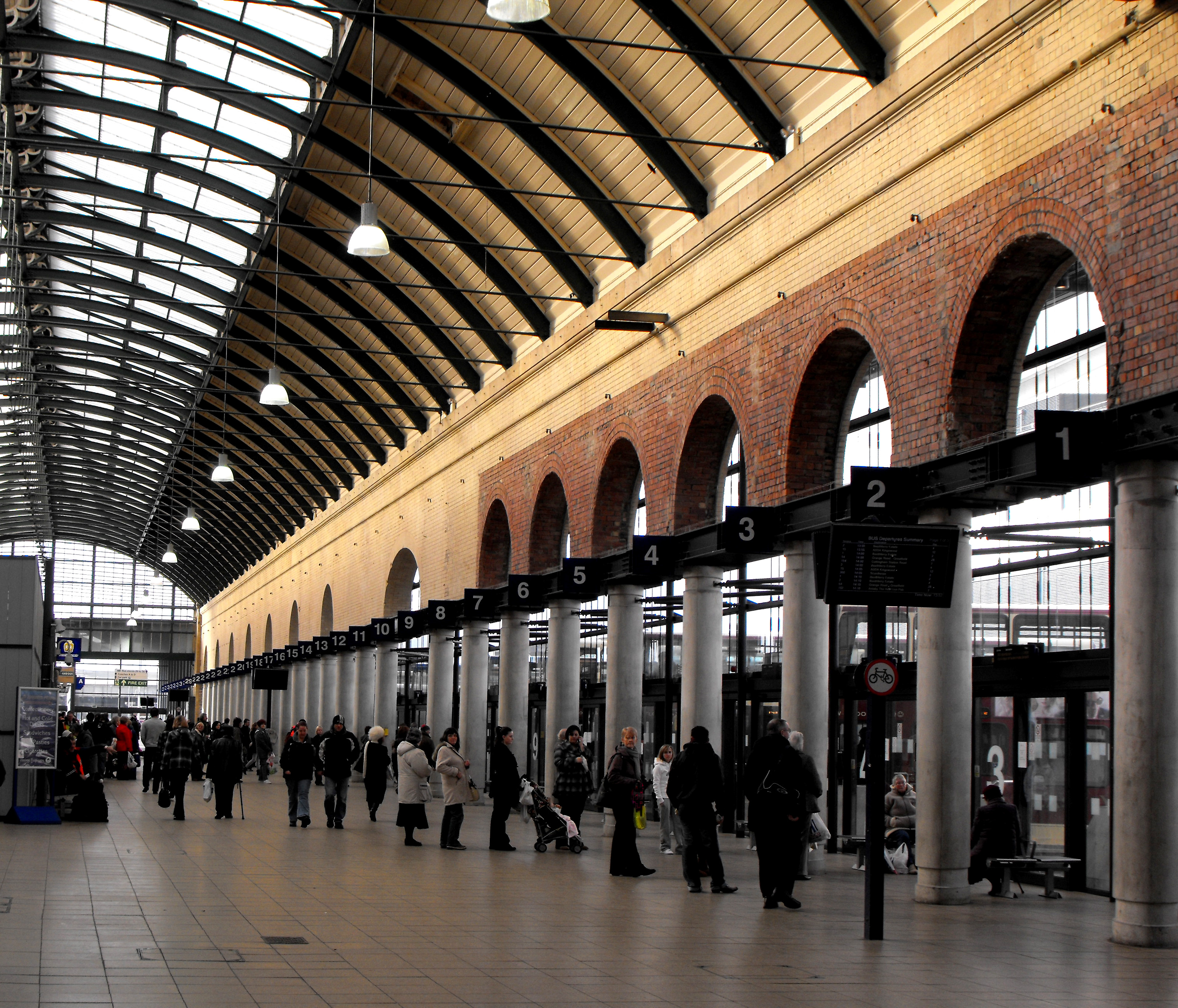
- The bus concourse in 2010

General information
- Location: , Kingston upon Hull, England
- Bus stands: 38 bus + 4 coach
- Bus operators: East Yorkshire; National Express; Stagecoach in Hull; Stagecoach in Lincolnshire

History
- Opened: 16 September 2007
Location

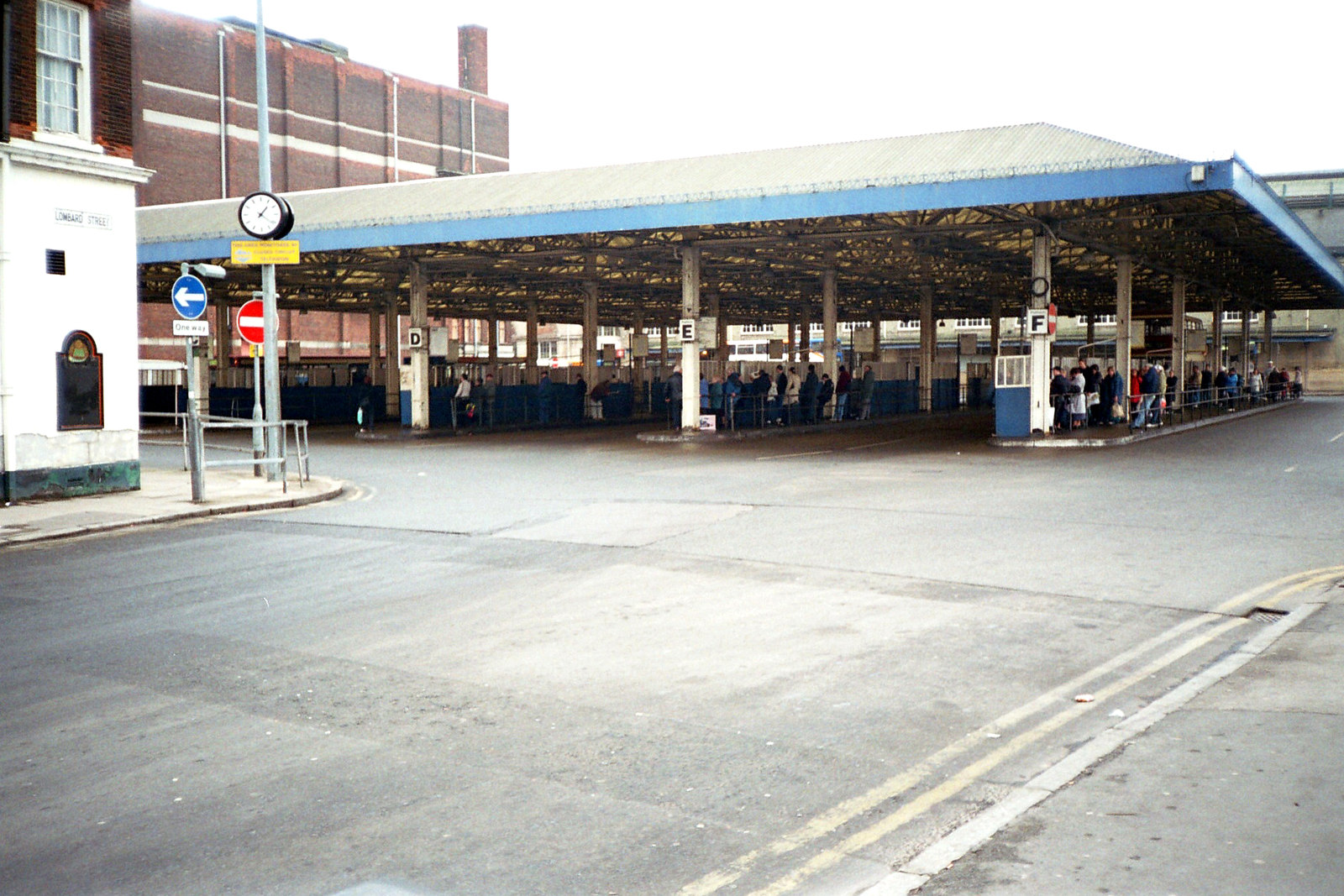
The 1930s Collier Street bus station (2004)

A bus station was built adjacent to Paragon station in 1935, at a cost of £55,000 on land freed by slum clearance. A new bus station integrated with the main railway station was developed and constructed in the first decade of the 21st century.

Hull Paragon Interchange opened on 16 September 2007, combining rail and bus station services on a single site. The bus terminal has 38 bus and 4 coach stands, replacing a separate 'island' bus station; the site of the former Hull bus station, adjacent to the north of the railway station now forms part of the St Stephen's shopping centre. The bus ranks are located at the north of the station, in a "saw-tooth" arrangement. The entrance to the station is from Ferensway and a reversing roundabout was provided at the west end of the station. The station had approximately 1,700 bus departures per day in September 2010. The area under the northernmost span of the train shed roof was converted into the concourse and queueing area for the bus station. (Note: 53.744534°N 0.347133°W, Paragon Interchange bus station (concourse).)

== Platforms ==
1. A bay platform, it was returned to use in the spring of 2024, after extensive work, it is used almost exclusively for Northern Trains services to Doncaster
2. Services to Halifax
3. Northern Trains services on routes to Sheffield from Bridlington or Scarborough or services from York terminating here
4. Northern services from Sheffield and York, via Bridlington or Scarborough
5. TransPennine Express services to Liverpool Lime Street
6. TransPennine Express services to Liverpool Lime Street
7. Hull Trains services from/to London King's Cross/Beverley. This platform is also used by LNER's limited service to and from King's Cross.

== Services ==
=== Railway ===
Hull Paragon is served by four train operating companies, which provide the following general off-peak service pattern in trains per hour/day (tph/tpd):

Hull Trains:

- 1 tp2h to London King's Cross
- 2 tpd to Beverley.

London North Eastern Railway:

- 1 tpd to London King's Cross.

Northern Trains:

- 1 tph to Bridlington
- 1 tph to Doncaster
- 1 tph to Halifax
- 1 tph to Scarborough
- 1 tph to Sheffield
- 1 tph to York.

TransPennine Express:

- 1 tph to Liverpool Lime Street, via Leeds and Manchester Victoria; of which:
  - Evening trains terminate at Leeds, Manchester Victoria or Selby.

Preceding station	National Rail	Following station
Brough	TransPennine Express North TransPennine	Terminus
Brough	Northern Trains York and Selby Lines	Terminus
Hessle	Northern Trains York and Selby Lines	Terminus
Brough	Northern Trains Yorkshire Coast line	Cottingham
Brough	Hull Trains; London–Hull/Beverley	Terminus
Brough	Hull Trains; London–Hull/Beverley	Cottingham
Brough	London North Eastern Railway; East Coast Main Line (Limited service)	Terminus
	Disused railways	
Terminus	Hull and Selby Railway	Hessle
Terminus	Hull and Holderness Railway	Hull Botanic Gardens
Terminus	Hull and Hornsea Railway	Hull Botanic Gardens
Terminus	Victoria Dock Branch Line	Hull Botanic Gardens
Terminus	London & North Eastern Railway (Hull and Barnsley Line)	Springhead Halt
	Future services	
Doncaster	Northern Trains; Sheffield – Hull	Terminus
Leeds	TBA; Northern Powerhouse Rail	Terminus
Doncaster	TBA; Northern Powerhouse Rail	Terminus

=== Buses ===
Bus routes from the station connect to all areas of Hull, along with key destinations in the East Riding and North Lincolnshire; express services reach York, Leeds, Grimsby and Scunthorpe. Most city bus services are operated by Stagecoach East Midlands, whilst East Yorkshire focus on services to the East Riding; routes in North East Lincolnshire are operated by Stagecoach in Lincolnshire and Stagecoach Grimsby-Cleethorpes.

== In popular culture ==
The station has been used as a filming location in the following:

- Clockwise, in which actor John Cleese injured a knee chasing for a train
- An episode of Agatha Christie's Poirot "The Plymouth Express"
- Only Fools and Horses episode "To Hull and Back"
- The 2024 film Blitz, directed by Oscar winner Sir Steve McQueen, the station was used to replicate war time London Waterloo.
