= Hambleton Junction =

Railway junction near Selby, England

Coordinates: 53.7767°N 1.1539°W

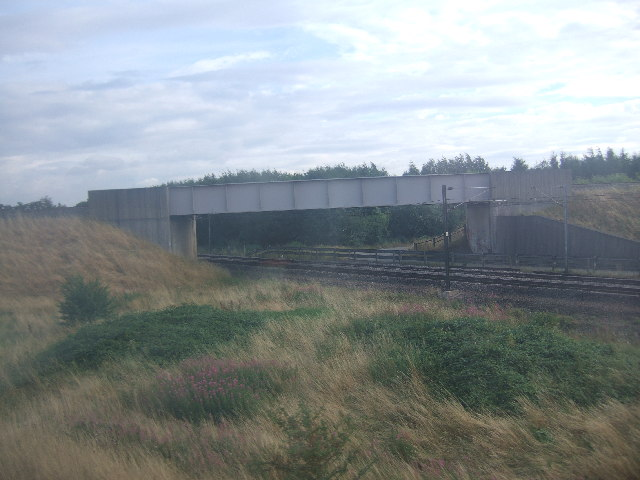
Hambleton Junction, showing the Leeds to Selby Line passing over the East Coast Main Line

Hambleton Junction is a grade-separated railway junction near Selby, North Yorkshire, England, which connects the East Coast Main Line with the Leeds to Selby Line.

== History ==
The junction was opened in 1983 as part of the Selby Diversion, which diverted the East Coast Main Line away from the Selby coalfield. The Leeds to Selby Line passes over the East Coast Main Line on a bridge. Sharply curved chords allow southbound trains on the East Coast Main Line to head eastwards towards Selby (and vice versa), and eastbound trains heading away from Leeds to join the southbound East Coast Main Line (and vice versa).

The north to east chord at the junction is regularly used by Northern services between York and Selby, whilst the south to west one is used by freight and occasional London North Eastern Railway passenger services between Leeds and London Kings Cross routed this way rather than the usual one via Wakefield Westgate for operational reasons.

== Upgrade ==
As of 2014 only the East Coast Main Line (ECML) running under the junction is electrified, the Leeds and Selby Line is scheduled for electrification. As part of the ECML power supply upgrade programme, the largest railway static frequency converter in the world was commissioned at the junction in January 2024.

== See also ==
- Railway electrification in Great Britain
