= Riccall railway station =

Disused railway station in North Yorkshire, England

Riccall
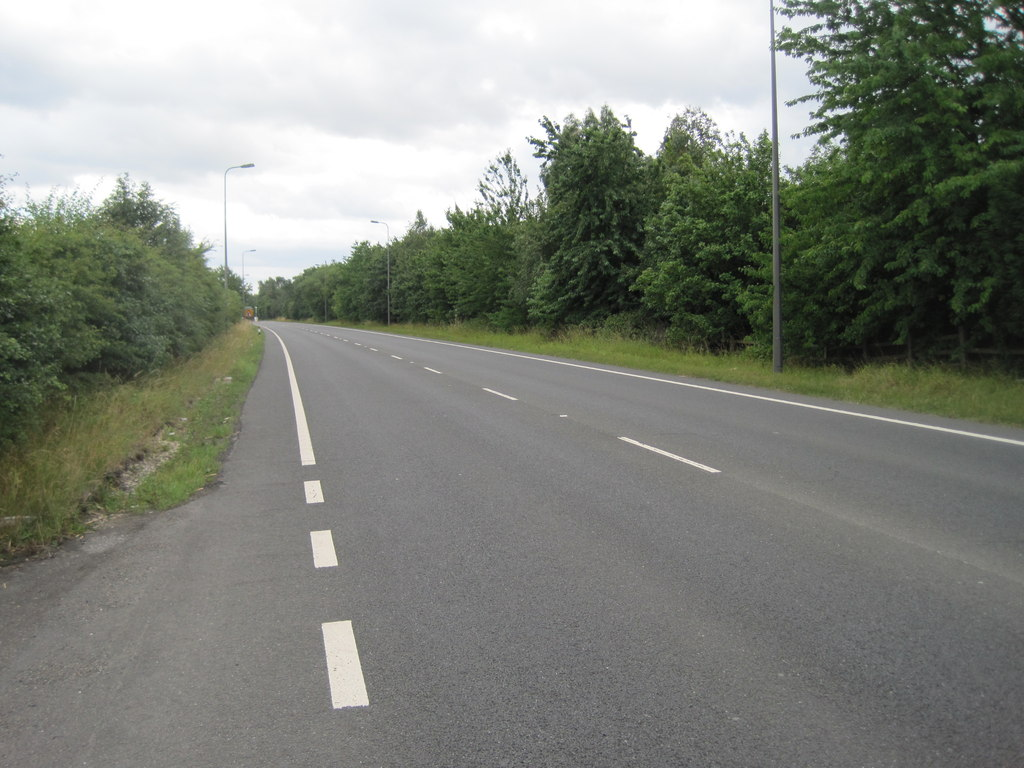
- Site of the former station (2010)

General information
- Location: Riccall, North Yorkshire; England
- Coordinates: 53.831440°N 1.053120°W
- Grid reference: SE624376
- Platforms: 2

Other information
- Status: Disused

History
- Pre-grouping: North Eastern Railway
- Post-grouping: LNER

Key dates
- 1871: Opened
- 1958: Closed to passengers
- 1964: Closed completely
Location

Riccall railway station was a railway station which served the village of Riccall, north of Selby, on the East Coast Main Line. It was opened in 1871, closed to passengers in 1958 and then closed to goods services in 1964; the station building is now a private dwelling. In 1983 the Selby Diversion was opened which led to the closure of the railway line through Riccall; the former trackbed is now the route of the A19 around the village.

Preceding station	Disused railways	Following station
Selby; Line closed, station open	York and Doncaster branch East Coast Main Line (Old route)	Escrick; Line and station closed
