= Riccall Manor House =

House in Riccall, North Yorkshire, England

Coordinates: 53°50′07″N 1°03′57″W

Riccall Manor House is a historic building in Riccall, a village in North Yorkshire, in England.

A manor house on the moated site, belonging to a prebend of York Minster, was first recorded in 1294. In 1350, licence was granted to crenellate the house, and in about 1480, a tower was built. In 1651, the property became owned by the Wormley family, who chose instead to live at nearby Riccall Hall. Much of the old house fell into ruin, but the tower survived, and in 1869 a new house was built, attached to the tower, to serve as a vicarage. In the 20th century, it became a private house, and the main entrance was altered. The house was grade II* listed in 1951, and the site with remains of the moat is a scheduled monument. Historic England describes the tower as "remarkable".

The house is built of red brick with stone dressings, a cogged eaves band and a Welsh slate roof. It has two storeys and a T-shaped plan, with a front of four bays. The doorway has a fanlight, there is one casement window, and the other windows are sashes. In the right bay is a three-storey square tower, and a five-stage turret with a square base, tapering to an octagonal top with a spirelet. The tower is built of pinkish-orange brick, and has buttresses, lancet windows, and a Lombard frieze. Inside, there are some Gothic fireplaces, and the main staircase has Gothic newel posts. The tower retains an early staircase, with access to the top floor by a ladder. The first floor garderobe retains its original appearance. The tower has stained glass in its ground floor window, dating from 1696, and possibly designed by Henry Gyles.

== See also ==
- Grade II* listed buildings in North Yorkshire (district)
- Listed buildings in Riccall
