= Naburn railway station =

Disused railway station in North Yorkshire, England

Naburn
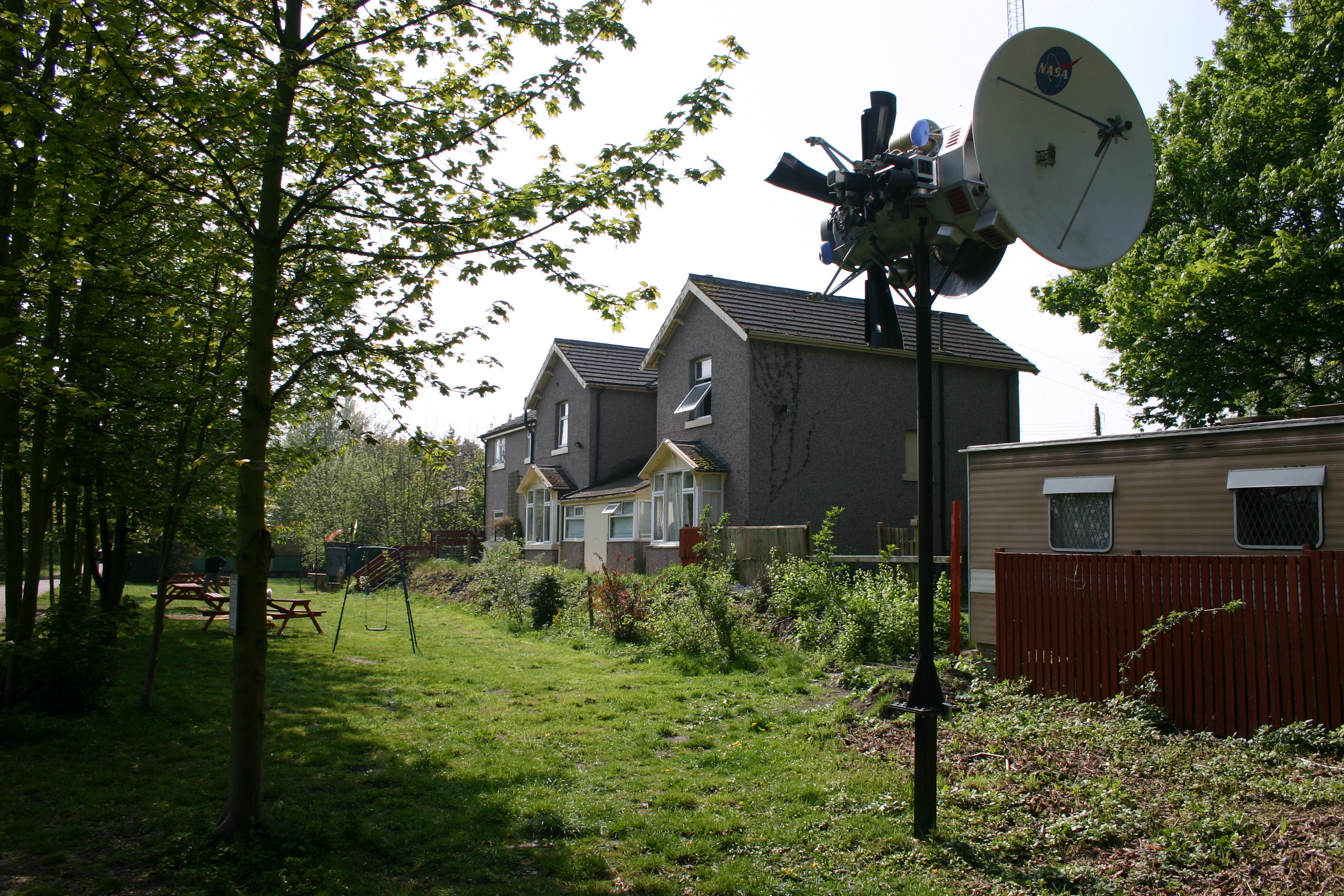
- The station building in 2009

General information
- Location: Naburn, City of York; England
- Coordinates: 53.9081°N 1.0872°W
- Grid reference: SE600462
- Platforms: 2

Other information
- Status: Disused

History
- Original company: North Eastern Railway
- Pre-grouping: North Eastern Railway
- Post-grouping: LNER

Key dates
- 1871: Opened
- 1953: Closed to passengers
- 1964: Closed completely
Location

Naburn railway station was a railway station which served the village of Naburn, south of York, on the East Coast Main Line. It closed to passengers in 1953 and to goods services in 1964; the station building was a hostel for a short period of time before being purchased as a private residence and is in the process of being refurbished. In 1983 the Selby Diversion was opened which led to the closure of the railway line through Naburn; the trackbed is now used as a cycle path between York and Selby and is part of the National Cycle Network and the Trans Pennine Trail.

Preceding station	Disused railways	Following station
Escrick; Line and station closed	York and Doncaster branch East Coast Main Line (Old route)	York; Line closed, station open
