= Selby railway station =

Railway station in North Yorkshire, England

Selby
- Platforms and footbridge, 2026

General information
- Location: Selby, North Yorkshire; England
- Coordinates: 53.783000°N 1.063440°W
- Grid reference: SE618322
- Manager: TransPennine Express
- Platforms: 3

Other information
- Station code: SBY
- Classification: DfT category E

History
- Opened: 1834

Passengers
- 2020/21: ▼0.124 million
- Interchange: 1,235
- 2021/22: ▲0.479 million
- Interchange: ▲19,271
- 2022/23: ▲0.555 million
- Interchange: ▲24,520
- 2023/24: ▲0.601 million
- Interchange: ▲35,480
- 2024/25: ▲0.696 million
- Interchange: ▼29,440

Listed Building – Grade II
- Feature: Selby Railway Station building on up platform, canopies on both platforms, footbridge and benches
- Designated: 14 November 1980
- Reference no.: 1365807
Location
Notes
- Passenger statistics from the Office of Rail and Road

Selby railway station is a Grade II listed station which serves the market town of Selby in North Yorkshire, England. The original terminus station was opened in 1834 for the Leeds and Selby Railway. The Hull and Selby Railway extended the line in 1840 and a new station was built, with the old station becoming a goods shed. The station was rebuilt in 1873 and 1891; the 1891 rebuilding was required due to the replacement of the swing bridge over the River Ouse at the same time.

The area around the station is a junction for a number of lines, including the former East Coast Main Line route between Doncaster and York, the Selby to Driffield Line (1848) and the Selby to Goole Line (1910). After 1983, with the opening of the Selby Diversion, Selby is no longer on the East Coast Main Line.

As of 2014, lines lead from Selby to Leeds, Hull and Doncaster. The station is managed by TransPennine Express and receives regional trains operated by Northern and TransPennine Express, as well as Hull-London services operated by Hull Trains and London North Eastern Railway.

== History ==
=== 1834 station ===
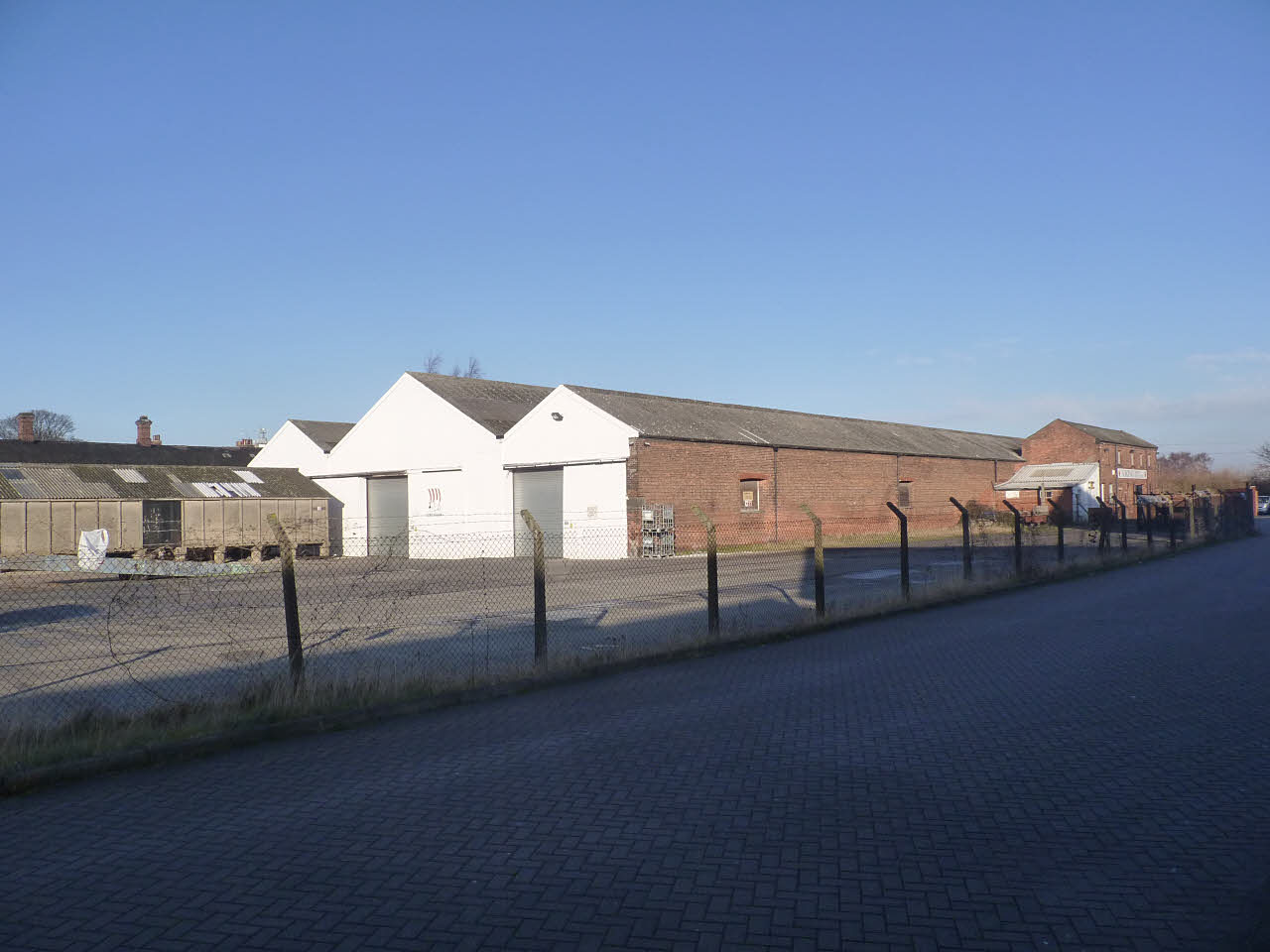
Original Leeds and Selby station, now warehousing (2013)

In 1834 the Leeds and Selby Railway opened, running east–west from a terminus station in Marsh Lane, Leeds to a terminus at Selby.

The line opened 22 September 1834, with only one track complete. A train from Leeds set off at 6 am and arrived in Selby around 9 am, to a general celebration. When general service started the journey took about 65 minutes. The main stations were not completed until a few months after the line opened; the Selby terminus at a cost of £10,300. Both tracks of the line were completed by 15 December 1834.

The basic design of the station was of a large warehouse shed, 245 feet (75 m) long and 96 feet (29 m) wide on a site of around 3 acres (1.2 ha), with a wooden trussed roof of three spans (of approximately 25', 46', and 25') supported via iron brackets on 19.5-foot (5.9 m) cast-iron columns, which were hollow and acted as drainpipes, to collect rain water then stored in underground tanks. Station offices and other buildings were built adjoining the station. The train shed had six lines of track, four for freight and two for passengers. Lines for coal and lime were separate, outside the shed to the east, the offices at the northwest corner. The line of rails continued through the station to a wharf on the River Ouse. Journeys to Hull were completed by Packet boat from Selby.

After construction of the new station in 1840, with the connection on the Hull and Selby Railway old station became a goods station.

The rail links to the old station were removed in the 1980s. As of 2009 the station is used as warehousing by Viking Shipping Services Ltd.

=== 1840 station ===
In 1840, the Hull and Selby Railway was opened. To cross the River Ouse, a bascule lifting bridge was installed, northwest of the old station. (Note: For details of the 1834 Ouse railway bridge at Selby see Selby swing bridge (1840)) At that time ships had priority over railway traffic.

The Hull and Selby, and Leeds and Selby railways connected 'end on' at Selby, west of the old station; the Leeds and Selby Line diverged from its old terminus path at a junction near the crossing of Park street; the line of the railway ran a short distance west, and parallel to the track in the original station. A new through station was built, and the old station became a goods station.

=== 1873 station ===
In 1871 the NER opened two new sections of track, from Shaftholme junction (4 miles north of Doncaster) to Selby Old West junction (Selby), and from Barlby junction (across the Ouse from Selby) to Chaloner's Whin junction (Dringhouses, York); these formed a new route for the East Coast Main Line.

A new station was constructed from between 1870 and 1873, built by Thomas Nelson to a design from Thomas Prosser's office in the NER.

=== 1891 station ===
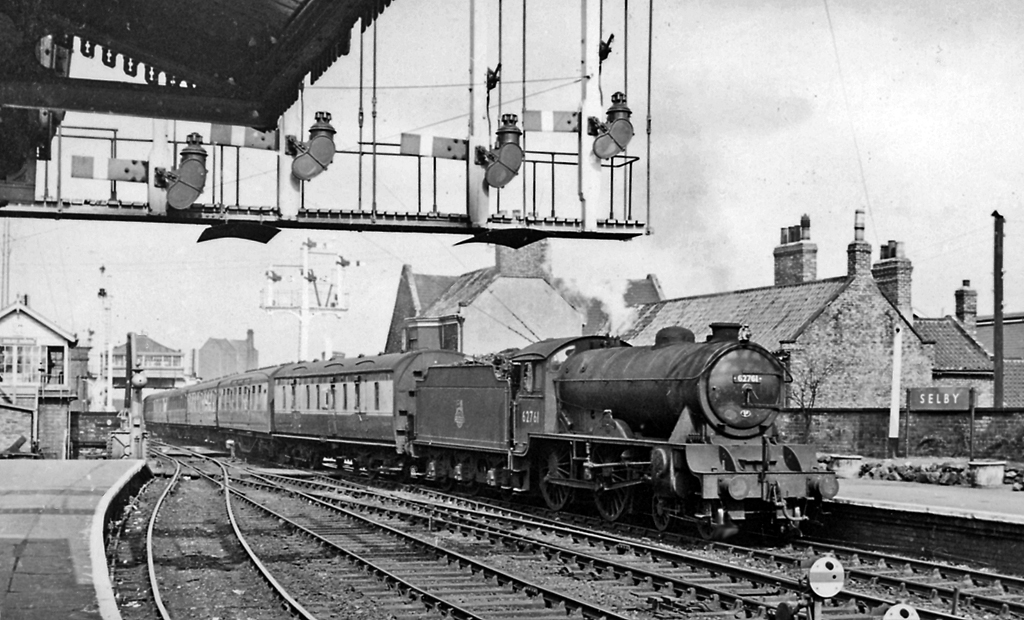
North end of Selby station and the swing bridge (1957)

In 1891 a new swing bridge was built downstream (east) of the original over the Ouse (see 1891 Selby swing bridge). The priority of river traffic over rail traffic was reversed on completion of the new bridge; crossings by rail were more than ten times more numerous than river craft.

As a consequence of the shift in the path of the railway the old station was rebuilt. The down (west) platforms were retained and modified, whilst the up (east) platforms were moved eastwards, re-using and extending Prosser's platform roof. The architect for the remodelling and extension was the NER's William Bell.

=== History of rail transport at Selby ===
In addition to the main lines west to Leeds (Leeds & Selby, 1834), east to Hull (Hull & Selby, 1840), and north and south to York and Doncaster (York & Doncaster branch, 1871), the rail system at Selby was the location for a number of junctions to other lines, and other facilities.

A branch from the Hull line (near Barlby to Market Weighton) opened in 1848. (see Selby and Market Weighton Railway) The line ran from Cliffe junction east of the Ouse south of Barlby, around a mile east of Selby.

The Cawood, Wistow and Selby Light Railway (CW&SLR) was opened in 1898 linking the Leeds & Selby Railway to the village of Cawood. Until 1904 the line had a separate station, Brayton Gates, 1 mile west of Selby. The line was predominantly used for agricultural traffic but also carried passengers until 1930, its final closure taking place in 1960.

The Selby to Goole Line opened in 1910, ran via the villages of Barlow, Drax and Rawcliffe to Goole. The line closed in 1964 as a result of the Beeching report. A short section of the line was used to access a ballast tip near Barlow until 1983.

In the mid 20th century the 'Loop Line' was converted into a triangle junction by the addition of a short chord between the Selby-Doncaster and Selby-Leeds lines.

In 1983 the Selby Diversion of the East Coast Main Line was opened, avoiding the area around Selby due to possible subsidence from the drift mining works of the Selby Coalfield. As a result, Selby ceased to be a through route on the ECML. The 1871 line from Selby to York was closed on 24 May 1983 and in 1989 was converted into a cycle track which now forms part of route 65 of the National Cycle Network. The line south to Temple Hirst Junction was retained – it is in regular use for both passenger & freight traffic and also serves as a diversionary route for Doncaster to Hull services if the line via Goole is closed for any reason.

==== Engine sheds and industrial branches ====
An engine shed was built 1870–2, in the V of the junction between the lines to Doncaster and Leeds. The shed was a standard NER design roundhouse by Prosser in a square overall shed, with 20 tracks. The shed was extended to a similar extent in 1896–8 with an adjacent square shed to a design by Bell. In around 1900 a short "Loop Line" was built south of the station, altering the path to the Leeds line by forming a junction on the Doncaster line further south, beyond the engine sheds. The original route out of Selby to Leeds became peripheral, part of the sidings associated with the engine sheds.

There was also a Canal works (dye and leather chemicals) east of the Doncaster line, (Note: Former Liquorice factory, acquired by Yorkshire Dyeware and Chemical Company in 1912. Disconnected from the rail network c. 1970s (OS map 1866, 1982). Closed by Clariant 2008.) on the banks of the Selby Canal, connected by sidings from the mid 20th century. Also on the Selby side of the Ouse were sidings for the gas works, and for a wood yard, and for the 'Ousegate Maltings' as well as accommodation sidings for the Goods shed.

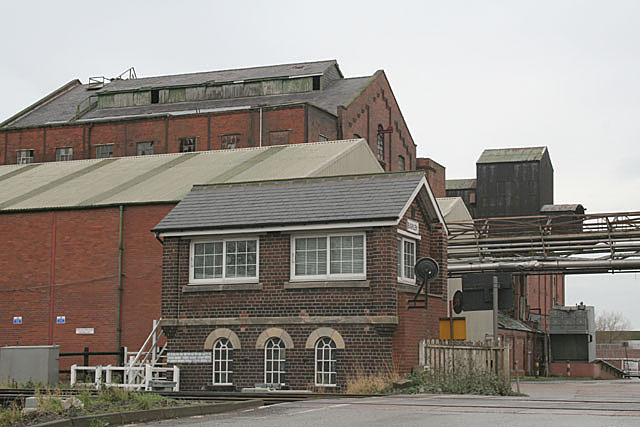
Barlby signal box with BOCM mill in background (2007)

On the far bank of the Ouse there were industrial sidings: A seed mill north of the line had been established by in 1909 with a rail connection; this developed into a large mill Olympia Mills, later part Jurgens (1919), (Note: See also Antoon Jurgens, Antonius Johannes Jurgens and Margarine Unie.) Unilever (1929), and BOCM (1952). (now part of BOCM Pauls, not rail connected).

Also on the far bank a Sugar Beet factory, was rail connected from the south side Hull-Selby line from the mid 20th century. In 1983 the site was acquired by logistics company Potter Group, and redeveloped into a 62 acres (25 ha) distribution centre including a rail freight terminal and warehousing. Client occupiers include Cemex (Asphalt concrete, using stone from Peak Forest, Derbyshire), and Clipper Logistics (e-commerce clothing/textile logistics).

== Facilities ==
The station is fully staffed, with the ticket office open throughout the week from start of service until 19:45 (19:00 on Sundays). A ticket machine is also provided on both platforms. Waiting rooms are located on each platform with passenger information screens and a public address system covering the whole station to provide train running information. Step-free access to all platforms is only available during staffed hours due to the need to use a barrow crossing. A refurbished footbridge to platforms 2 and 3 including passenger lifts is scheduled to open by June 2023.

== Current services ==
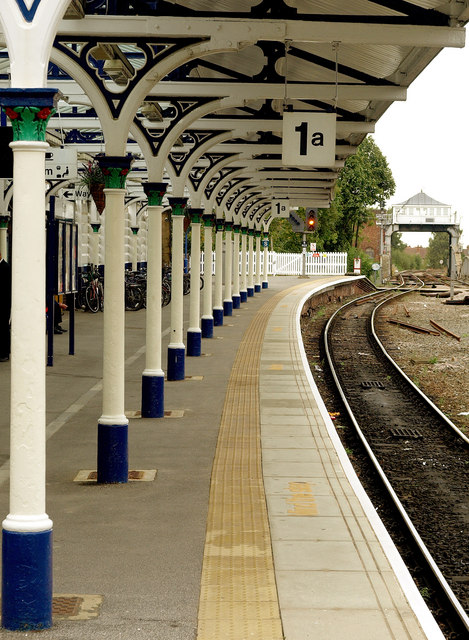
Waiting canopy on platform 1

To Hull – Monday to Saturday, there are now three trains per hour to Hull. An hourly TransPennine Express service, two per hour run by Northern (one each from York and Halifax via Bradford and Leeds), plus some Hull Trains services from London King's Cross. The service from York continues beyond Hull to Bridlington.

To York – there is generally an hourly service daily north to York. A few services start/ terminate here, but most run to and from Hull or Bridlington.

To Leeds – Monday to Sunday, there are two trains per hour to Leeds. One Northern stopping service to Halifax via Bradford Interchange Monday to Saturday, with a Selby to Leeds stopping service on Sundays and one TransPennine Express service to Liverpool Lime Street via Manchester Victoria.

To London – there are eight trains per day in total via Doncaster to London King's Cross. All London services are operated by Hull Trains except the Hull Executive, which is operated by London North Eastern Railway.

Northern also runs one train each way to/from Doncaster and Sheffield, the one from there continues to Bridlington. LNER also runs an evening service between Hull and Doncaster (calling at Selby) as a balancing working for its northbound business peak service from London. The unit then returns empty to Neille Hill depot in Leeds for overnight servicing.

In recent years, Northern has introduced improved service levels. The current Leeds to Selby stopping service has been extended through to Hull (see above – implemented in December 2019) and the York – Hull line service is now hourly throughout the week (including Sundays).

Preceding station	National Rail	Following station
Doncaster or London King's Cross	London North Eastern Railway; East Coast Main Line/York–Doncaster branch – Hull and Selby Line (Limited service)	Brough
Doncaster	Hull Trains; East Coast Main Line/York–Doncaster branch – Hull and Selby Line	Howden
South Milford	TransPennine Express North TransPennine	Howden
South Milford	Northern Selby Line	Wressle
York	Northern Selby Diversion	Wressle
Sherburn-in-Elmet	Northern Selby Line	Wressle
Doncaster	Northern York and Doncaster branch	Wressle
	Disused railways	
Temple Hirst	York and Doncaster branch (East Coast Main Line, Old route)	Riccall
Terminus	CW&SLtR	Wistow
Terminus	Leeds and Selby Railway	Hambleton
Terminus	Selby–Goole line	Barlow
Terminus	Selby–Driffield line	Cliff Common

== Trivia ==
In 2009 Selby celebrated the 175th anniversary of the opening of the first Selby station.

The station is mentioned in the song "Slow Train" by Flanders and Swann.

The BOCM complex at Barlby can briefly be seen at the start of the train journey in the opening sequence of 1971 British gangster movie Get Carter.

== See also ==
- Listed buildings in Selby
