= Balne =

Village and civil parish in North Yorkshire, England

Coordinates: 53.66458°N 1.1129°W

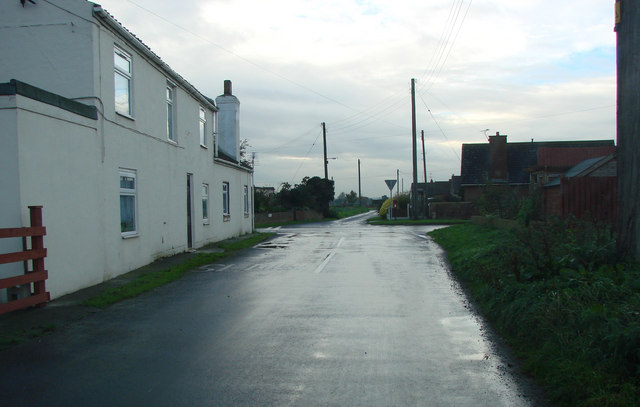
- The crossroads, Balne

- Location within North Yorkshire
- Population: 224 (2011 census)
- OS grid reference: SE587190
- Unitary authority: North Yorkshire
- Ceremonial county: North Yorkshire
- Region: Yorkshire and the Humber
- Country: England
- Sovereign state: United Kingdom
- Post town: GOOLE
- Postcode district: DN14
- Police: North Yorkshire
- Fire: North Yorkshire
- Ambulance: Yorkshire
- UK Parliament: Selby

Balne is a village and civil parish in the county of North Yorkshire in England, south of Selby. According to the 2001 census the parish had a population of 231, reducing to 224 at the 2011 census. The parish is bound to the north-east by the East Riding of Yorkshire and to the south by the Metropolitan Borough of Doncaster in South Yorkshire.

Balne is part of the historic West Riding of Yorkshire. From 1974 to 2023 it was part of the Selby District, it is now administered by the unitary North Yorkshire Council.

The name Balne possibly derives from the Middle English balne from the Latin balneum meaning 'bathing place'.

The village formed the centre of the ancient district of Balne, which consisted of the eastern part of the Osgoldcross wapentake, probably including all the land between the River Don and the River Aire. Places such as Walden Stubbs and Fishlake were formerly described as being "-in-Balne", and Thorpe-in-Balne still is. Balne Croft Common near Thorne may have been a detached part of the township of Balne.

The village has a Grade II Listed Building called Lowgate Farmhouse. Until 1958, Balne had a railway station as part of the North Eastern Railway.
