= St Mary's Church, Riccall =

English parish church

Coordinates: 53.8331°N 1.0601°W

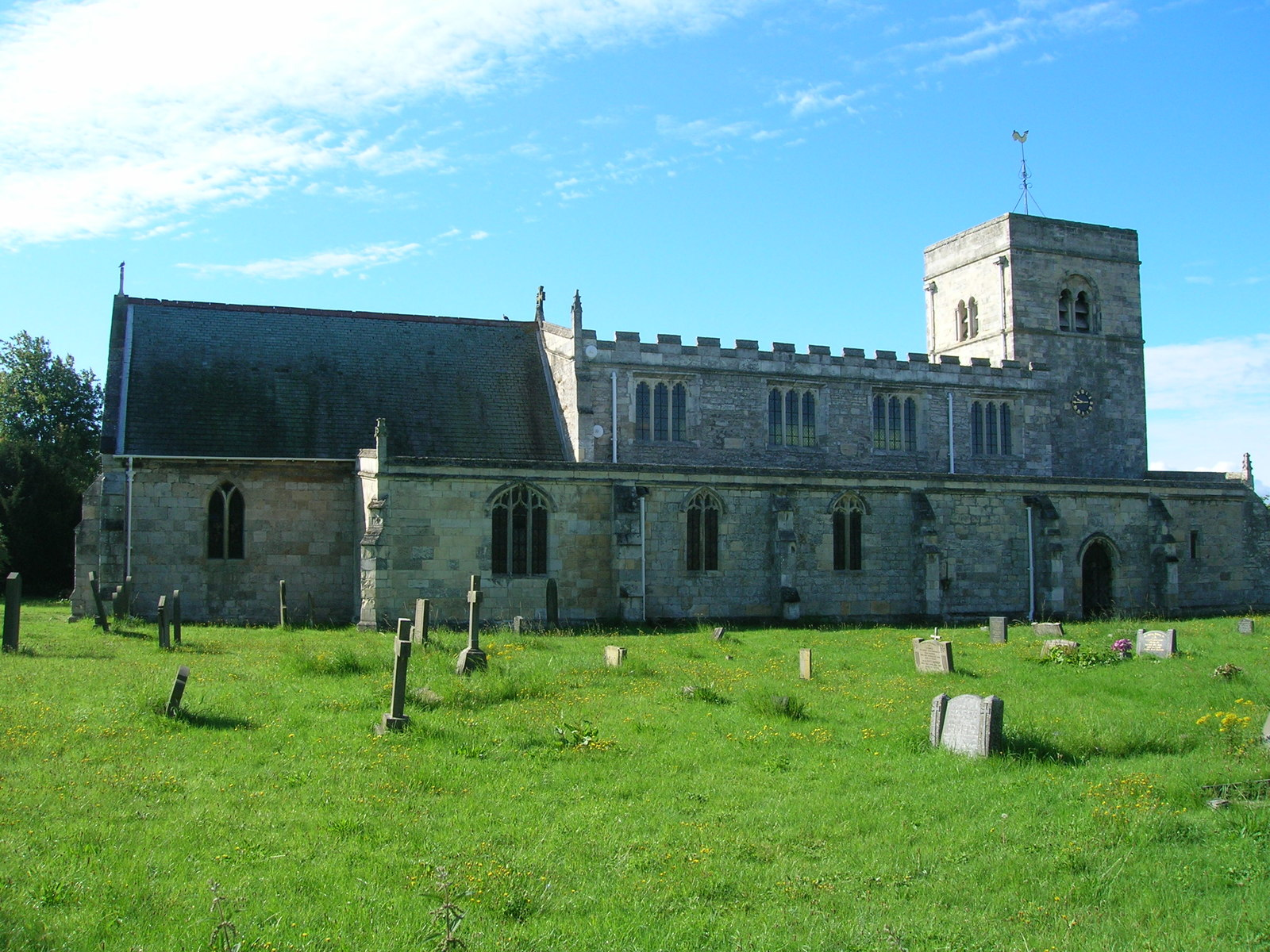
The church from the north, in 2011

St Mary's Church is the parish church of Riccall, a village north of Selby in North Yorkshire, England.

The oldest part of the church are the three western bays of the nave, which date from the mid- or late-12th century. The tower was built around the end of that century, then in the early 13th century, arcades were added, followed in the late 13th century by the chancel and north chapel. The chancel was repaired some time after 1472, when a south chapel was added. Between then and the English Reformation, the nave was heightened, a rood loft added, the aisles were widened, and a porch was built.

Between 1862 and 1877, the church was heavily restored by John Loughborough Pearson. He rebuilt the tower and heightened it, constructed a new east window, roofs and porch, and rebuilt parts of other walls. In 1966, the church was grade I listed.

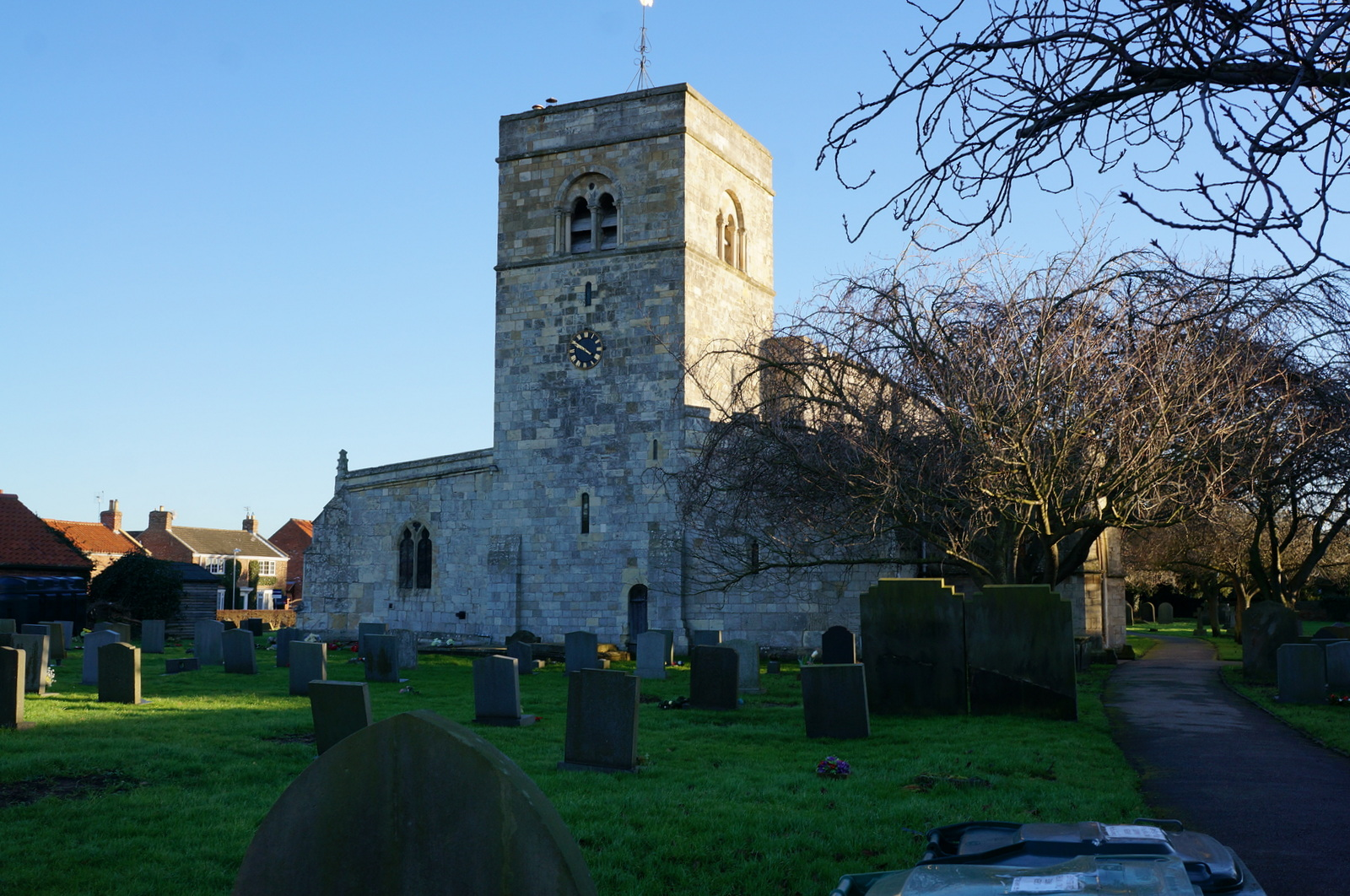
West end of the church, in 2015

The church is built of Magnesian Limestone and has a Welsh slate roof. The tower is at the west end and has two stages, while the nave is of five bays, with aisles, and the chancel has two bays. Some windows on the north side are Perpendicular, but most date from the 19th century.

The church's most noted feature is the south doorway, built in the 1150s and reset twice, most recently in the 15th century. It has three orders of arches and its voussoirs are decorated with a variety of Biblical, mythological and everyday scenes. Some designs have been held to have a Viking influence. Inside, there are remains of a brass dedicated to Maud and Robert Kelsey, dating from about 1500, two Baroque wall tablets, and a coat of arms of George III, painted in 1792. There is also a 17th-century communion rail.

== See also ==
- Grade I listed buildings in North Yorkshire (district)
- Listed buildings in Riccall
