= Moss, South Yorkshire =

Village and civil parish in South Yorkshire, England

Coordinates: 53°37′N 1°06′W

Moss
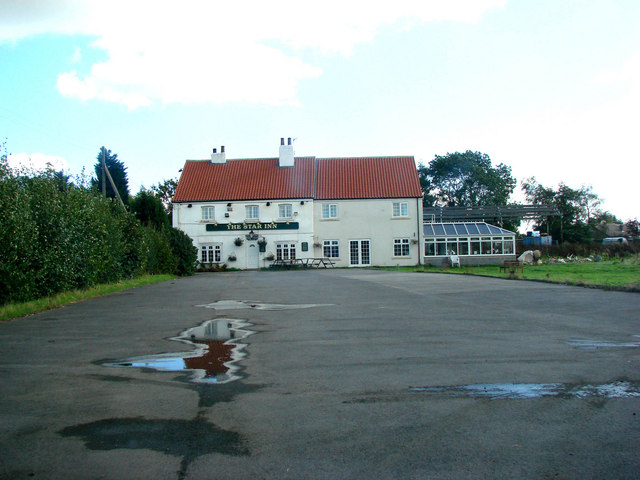
- The Star public house

- Location within South Yorkshire
- Population: 389 (2011 Census)
- Civil parish: Moss
- Metropolitan borough: Doncaster
- Metropolitan county: South Yorkshire
- Region: Yorkshire and the Humber
- Country: England
- Sovereign state: United Kingdom
- Post town: DONCASTER
- Postcode district: DN6
- Dialling code: 01302
- Police: South Yorkshire
- Fire: South Yorkshire
- Ambulance: Yorkshire
- UK Parliament: Doncaster North

Moss is a village and civil parish in the City of Doncaster in South Yorkshire, England. The population of the parish at the 2011 Census was 389, an increase from 290 at the 2001 Census. From 1871 to 1953 the village was served by Moss railway station.The name Moss derives from the Old English mos meaning 'bog'.

== See also ==
- Listed buildings in Moss, South Yorkshire
