= Listed buildings in Riccall =

Riccall is a civil parish in the county of North Yorkshire, England. It contains eleven listed buildings that are recorded in the National Heritage List for England. Of these, one is listed at Grade I, the highest of the three grades, one is at Grade II*, the middle grade, and the others are at Grade II, the lowest grade. The parish contains the village of Riccall and the surrounding area, and all the listed buildings are in the village. These include houses and associated structures, a church, a former windmill and a war memorial.

== Key ==
Grade	Criteria
I	Buildings of exceptional interest, sometimes considered to be internationally important
II*	Particularly important buildings of more than special interest
II	Buildings of national importance and special interest

== Buildings ==
Name and location	Photograph	Date	Notes	Grade
St Mary's Church; 53.83311°N 1.06004°W		Mid to late 12th century	The church has been altered and extended through the centuries, including a restoration and partial rebuilding in 1864–65 by J. L. Pearson. It is built in magnesian limestone with a Welsh slate roof, and consists of a nave with a clerestory, north and south aisles, a south porch, a chancel with north and south chapels, and a west tower. The tower has two stages, a round-arched doorway, a slit window, bands, two-light round-arched bell openings, a clock face and a low parapet. The porch has a pointed-arched opening, and a Norman inner doorway with three orders of elaborate carving and decoration. The nave, south aisle and porch have embattled parapets.	I
Bangram Hill Farmhouse; 53.83625°N 1.05706°W		Late 17th century	The house has a timber framed core, and was encased in the early 18th century in pinkish-brown brick. It has a dentilled eaves band, and a swept roof in pantile and Welsh slate, with brick coping. There are two storeys and three bays, and a rear range and outshut. On the ground floor is a doorway and sash windows, all under elliptical arches, and the upper floor contains horizontally sliding sashes.	II
10 Church Street; 53.83222°N 1.06080°W		Early to mid-18th century	The house is in pinkish-brown brick, with a floor band, a dentilled eaves band, and a swept pantile roof with brick coped gables. There are two storeys and three bays, and a rear range. On the front is a doorway, the windows are casements, and the ground floor openings are under elliptical arches.	II
Hawthorn Farm; 53.83344°N 1.06239°W	—	Early to mid-18th century	The house, which was later extended, is in pinkish-brown brick, with a floor band and a tile roof. There are two storeys and two bays. On the front is a porch, and all the windows are tripartite horizontally sliding sashes.	II
Pigeoncote, The Manor House; 53.83547°N 1.06518°W	—	Mid-18th century	The pigeoncote is in pinkish-orange brick, with a dentilled eaves band, and a pantile roof with brick coping and kneelers. There is one tall storey and one bay. On the left gable end is a doorway under an elliptical arch, and on the right gable end is an elliptical-arched opening and blocked pigeon openings. The pigeon openings are on the roof, and inside, there are brick nesting boxes.	II
10 Kelfield Road; 53.83364°N 1.06186°W	—	c. 1810	The house is in red-brown brick, with stone dressings, and a pantile roof with stone coped gables and moulded kneelers. There are two storeys and attics, three bays, and a lower two-storey rear wing. On the front is a central doorway and sash windows, and on the right return is an attic doorway. The rear wing has a doorway partly blocked by a casement window, and another casement window.	II
Red House; 53.83316°N 1.05884°W		Early 19th century	The house is in reddish-brown brick with a hipped Welsh slate roof. There are two storeys and three bays. In the centre is a doorway with fluted Corinthian pilasters and a decorative fanlight, and ornamental cast iron columns carrying a frieze a hood, and a decorative cast iron balcony. The windows are sashes with fluted wedge lintels and fluted keystones.	II
Riccall House; 53.83386°N 1.05795°W		Early 19th century	The house, later used for other purposes, is in pinkish-brown brick, with stone dressings and a hipped pantile roof. There are two storeys, three bays, and a single-storey extension on the left. In the centre is a fluted Roman Doric doorcase with a frieze and a modillion hood, and a door with a decorative fanlight. The windows are casements with fluted wedge lintels and keystones.	II
Tower House; 53.82939°N 1.06395°W		Early 19th century	The windmill has been extended and converted for other uses. It is in pinkish-brown brick, and contains windows unde segmental arches.	II
The Manor House; 53.83527°N 1.06576°W	—	1869	A vicarage, later a private house, incorporating a 15th century tower. It is in red brick with stone dressings, a cogged eaves band and a Welsh slate roof. There are two storeys and a T-shaped plan, with a front of four bays. The doorway has a fanlight, there is one casement window, and the other windows are sashes. In the right bay is a three-storey square tower and a five-stage turret with a square base, tapering to an octagonal top with a spirelet. The tower is in pinkish-orange brick, and has buttresses, lancet windows, and a Lombard frieze.	II*
War memorial 53.83332°N 1.05929°W		1921	The war memorial, in the churchyard of St Mary's Church, is in Portland stone. It consists of a tall, tapering, fluted pillar, with a decorative capital and a moulded band below. At the base of the pillar, on all faces, is a wreath carved in relief. The pillar has a moulded foot, and it stands on a square pedestal on a tapering plinth with a moulded foot, on a narrow, single-step chamfered base. There are inscriptions on the pedestal and the plinth, and on the plinth are the names of those lost in the First World War.	II
