= Listed buildings in Moss, South Yorkshire =

Moss is a civil parish in the metropolitan borough of Doncaster, South Yorkshire, England. The parish contains five listed buildings that are recorded in the National Heritage List for England. All the listed buildings are designated at Grade II, the lowest of the three grades, which is applied to "buildings of national importance and special interest". The parish contains the village of Moss and smaller settlements, and is otherwise completely rural. The listed buildings consist of a farmhouse, farm buildings, a church, and a former windmill.

== Buildings ==
Name and location	Photograph	Date	Notes
Glebe Farmhouse; 53.60524°N 1.09526°W		Late 17th century	The farmhouse, which has been extended and altered, is in limestone, partly rendered, with quoins, stone slate eaves courses, and a pantile roof with coped gables and finial bases. There are two storeys and an attic, a front of two bays, and a two-storey rear wing. On the front are two restored mullioned windows in both floors.
Barn, Glebe Farm; 53.60565°N 1.09528°W		Late 18th century	The barn is in red brick with a stone slate tabled and dentilled eaves course, and a pantile roof with a coped gable and shaped kneelers on the left. There are two storeys and five bays. On the south front are segmental-arched doorways in both floors, hatches and slit vents, and at the rear is a central basket-arched opening.
Wrancarr Mill; 53.60810°N 1.10458°W		Mid 19th century	The former tower windmill is in red brick with a band below the parapet, and it consists of a truncated cone with four storeys. In the ground floor is a doorway, the top floor contains casement windows, and in the other floors are sash windows.
All Saints Church, Haywood; 53.60793°N 1.11772°W		1873–75	The church was designed by Charles Buckeridge in Early English style and executed by J. L. Pearson, and it has been converted into a house. It is built in limestone with a red tile roof, and consists of a nave with a south porch, a chancel, and a west steeple. The steeple has a tower with four stages, clasping buttresses, a two-light west window, and an octagonal broach spire with a weathervane.
Barn, Ponderosa Farm; 53.62242°N 1.08606°W		Undated	The barn is in red brick with dentilled and tabled eaves courses, and an asbestos sheet roof. There are two storeys and five bays. The barn contains doorways, hatches and slit vents.
