= Escrick railway station =

Disused railway station in North Yorkshire, England

Escrick
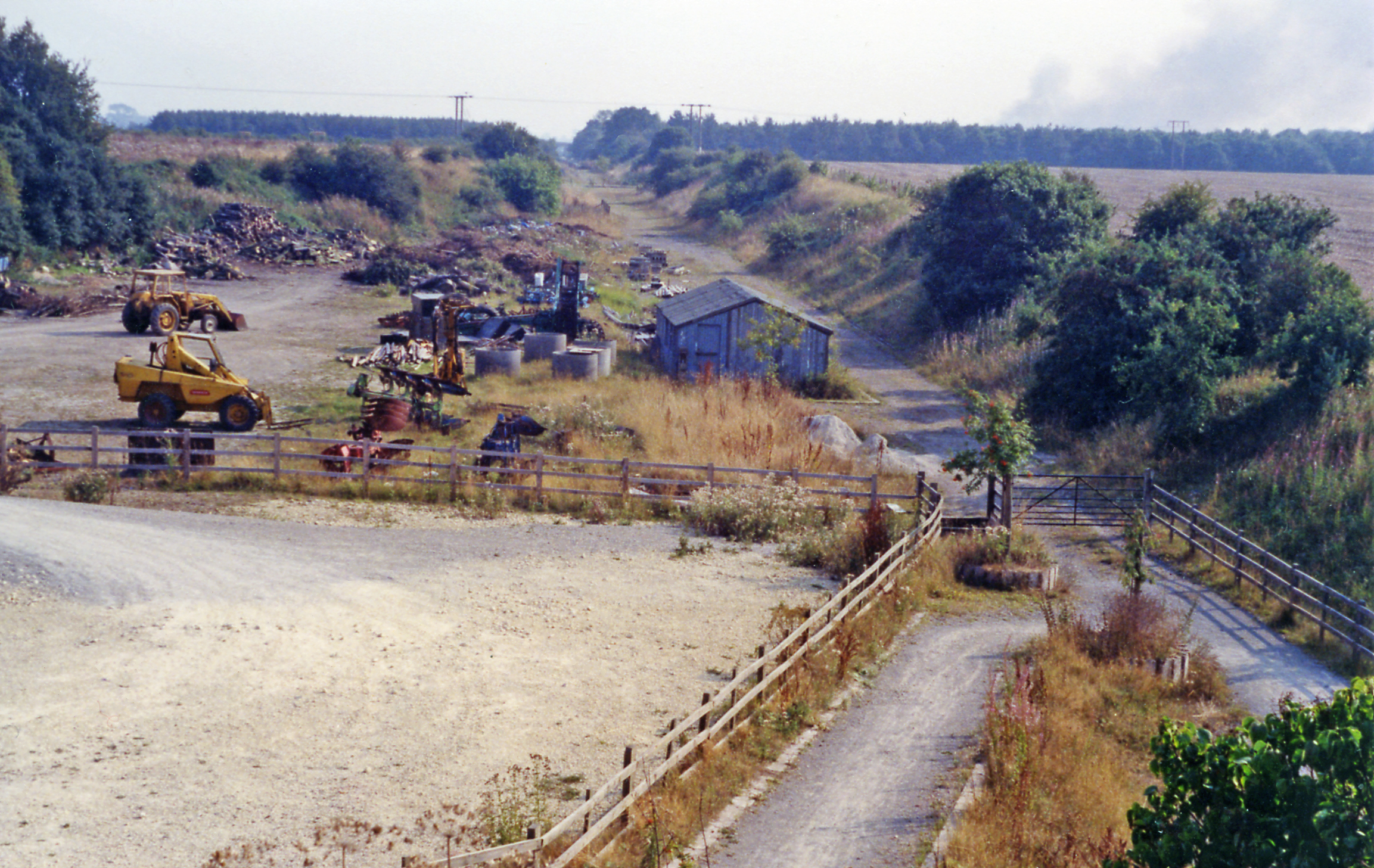
- Site of the station in 1991

General information
- Location: Escrick, North Yorkshire; England
- Coordinates: 53.8696°N 1.0639°W
- Grid reference: SE616419
- Platforms: 2

Other information
- Status: Disused

History
- Original company: North Eastern Railway
- Pre-grouping: North Eastern Railway
- Post-grouping: LNER

Key dates
- 2 January 1871: Opened
- 8 June 1953: Closed to passengers
- 1961: Closed completely
Location

Escrick railway station served the village of Escrick, North Yorkshire, England from 1871 to 1961 on the East Coast Main Line.

== History ==
The station opened on 2 January 1871 by the North Eastern Railway. It closed to passengers on 8 June 1953 and closed to goods traffic in 1961.

The line was closed in October 1983, with all trains diverted onto the new section of the East Coast Main Line between Temple Hirst Junction and Colton Junction (Selby Diversion).

Preceding station	Disused railways	Following station
Naburn; Line and station closed	North Eastern Railway; East Coast Main Line	Riccall; Line and station closed
