= Balne railway station =

Disused railway station in South Yorkshire, England

Balne
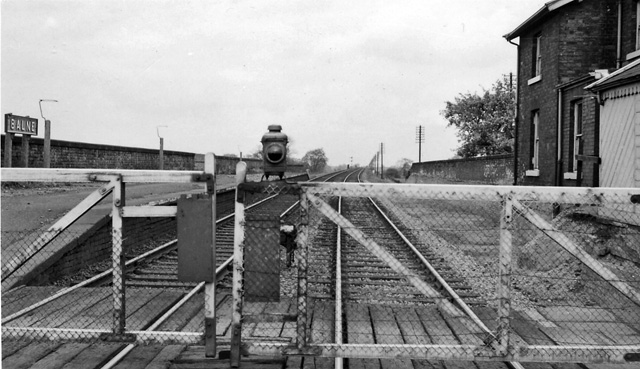
- The station after closure to passengers in 1961

General information
- Location: Balne, North Yorkshire; England
- Coordinates: 53.6644°N 1.1051°W
- Grid reference: SE592190
- Platforms: 2

Other information
- Status: Disused

History
- Original company: North Eastern Railway
- Pre-grouping: North Eastern Railway
- Post-grouping: LNER

Key dates
- 2 January 1871: Opened
- 15 September 1958: Closed to passengers
- 1964: Closed completely
Location

Balne railway station served the village of Balne, North Yorkshire, England, from 1871 to 1964 on the East Coast Main Line.

== History ==
The station opened on 2 January 1871 by the North Eastern Railway. The station closed to passengers on 15 September 1958 and to goods traffic in 1964.

Preceding station	Historical railways	Following station
Heck; Line open, station closed	North Eastern Railway; East Coast Main Line	Moss; Line open, station closed
