= Moss railway station =

Disused railway station in South Yorkshire, England

Moss
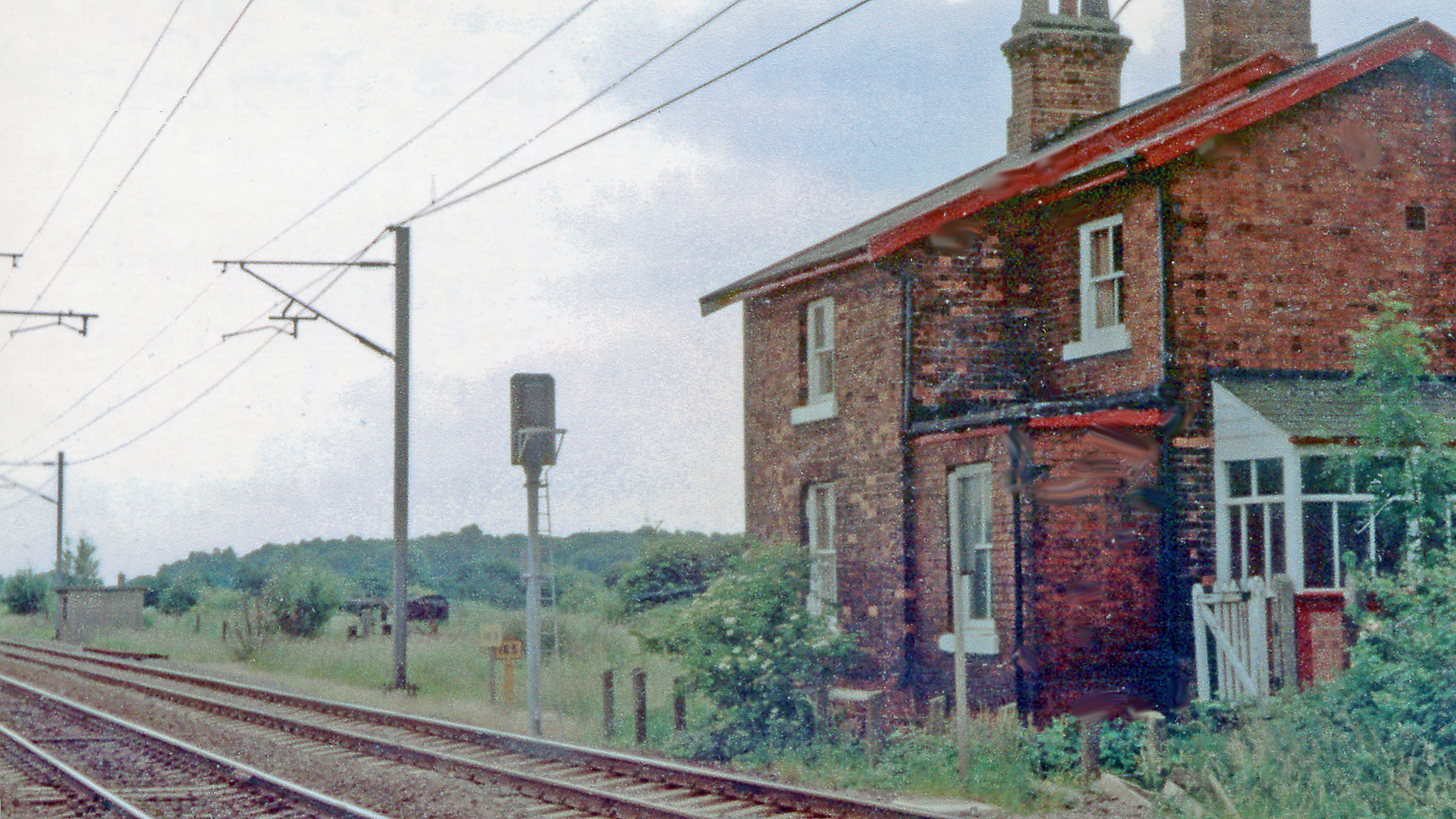
- Remains of Moss station in 1992

General information
- Location: Moss, South Yorkshire; England
- Coordinates: 53.622°N 1.1131°W
- Grid reference: SE587143
- Platforms: 2

Other information
- Status: Disused

History
- Original company: North Eastern Railway
- Pre-grouping: North Eastern Railway
- Post-grouping: LNER

Key dates
- 2 January 1871: Opened
- 8 June 1953: Closed
Location

Moss railway station served the village of Moss, South Yorkshire, England from 1871 to 1953 on the East Coast Main Line.

== History ==
The station opened on 2 January 1871 by the North Eastern Railway. It closed to both passengers and goods traffic on 8 June 1953.

| Preceding station | Historical railways | Following station |
|---|---|---|
| Balne; Line open, station closed | North Eastern Railway; East Coast Main Line | Joan Croft Halt; Line open, station closed |
