= Arksey railway station =

Disused railway station in South Yorkshire, England

Arksey
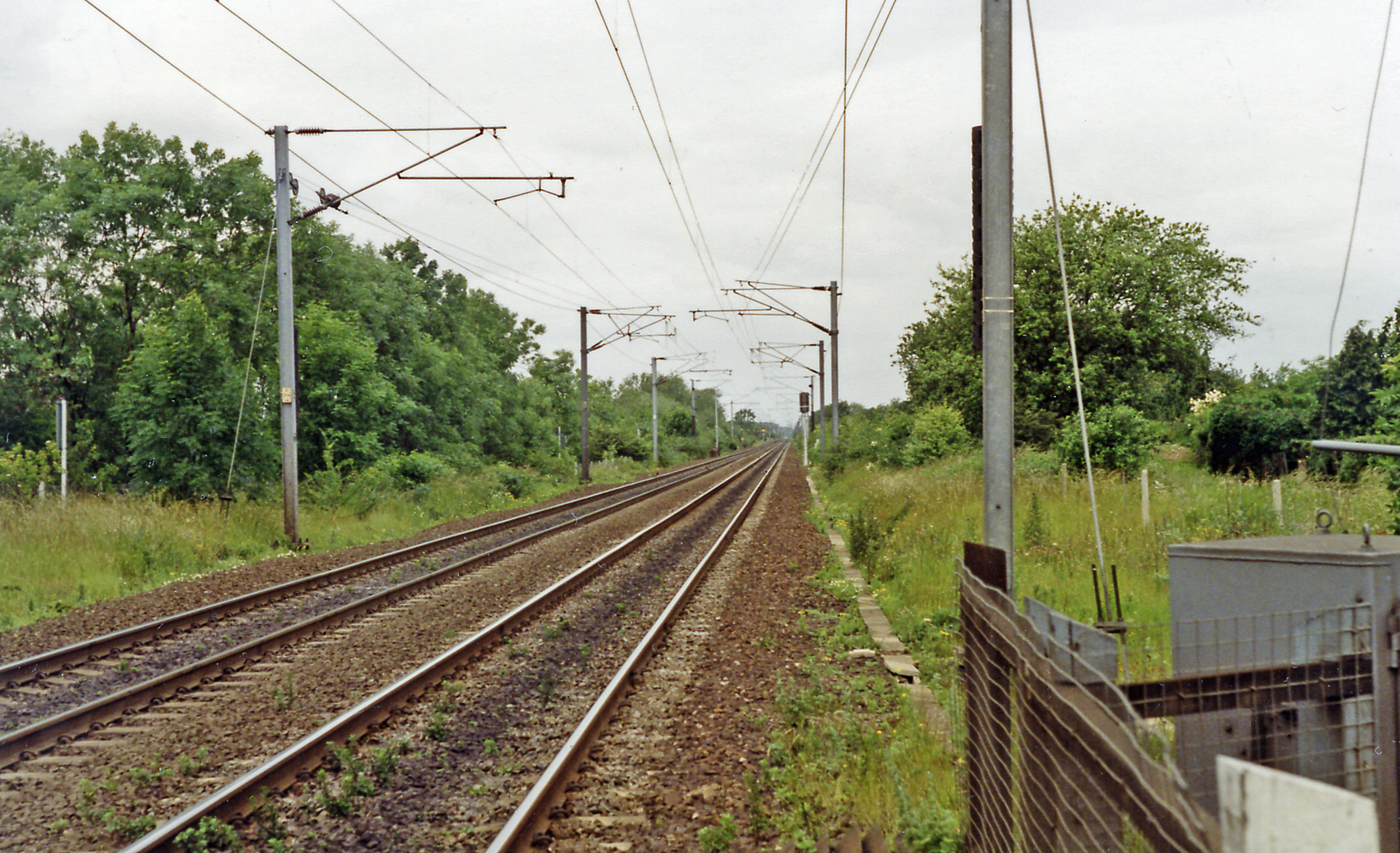
- Site of the former station in June 1992

General information
- Location: Arksey, Doncaster; England
- Coordinates: 53.551550°N 1.133150°W
- Grid reference: SE575064
- Platforms: 2

Other information
- Status: Disused

History
- Original company: Great Northern Railway
- Pre-grouping: Great Northern Railway
- Post-grouping: London and North Eastern Railway

Key dates
- 6 June 1848: Station opens as Stockbridge
- December 1850: Station renamed Arksey and Stockbridge
- September 1854: Station renamed Arksey
- 5 August 1952: Station closed for passengers
- 7 December 1964: Closed for goods
Location

Arksey railway station, originally named Stockbridge and later Arksey and Stockbridge was a station which served the villages of Arksey and Stockbridge in the English county of South Yorkshire. It was served by trains on the main line between Doncaster and York.

== History ==
The station was opened by the Great Northern Railway and became part of the London and North Eastern Railway during the Grouping of 1923, passing on to the Eastern Region of British Railways during the nationalisation of 1948. It was then closed by British Railways on 5 August 1952. It had two platforms, which were staggered across the level crossing at the station. The York-bound platform was south of the level crossing, and the Doncaster-bound platform was north of the crossing.

== The site today ==
Nothing is left of the station but trains still pass the site on the electrified East Coast Main Line.

Preceding station	Historical railways	Following station
Doncaster	Great Northern Railway; East Coast Main Line	Joan Croft Halt; Line open. Station closed
Doncaster	Great Northern Railway / Lancashire and Yorkshire Railway; Askern Branch Line	Askern; Line open. Station closed
