= Joan Croft Halt railway station =

Disused railway station in South Yorkshire, England

Joan Croft Halt
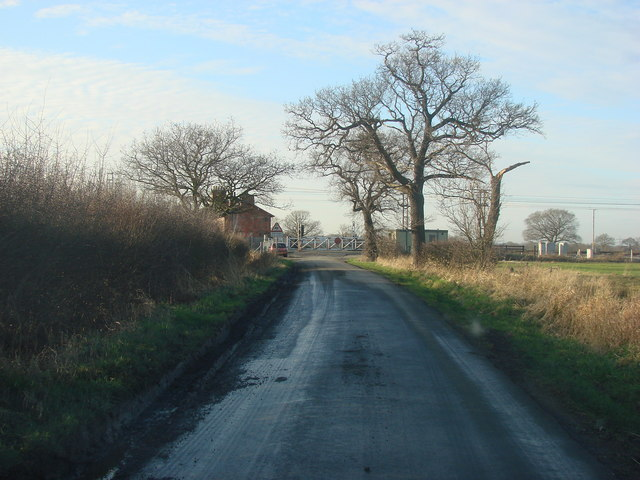
- Joan Croft level crossing with former station buildings to the left (2007)

General information
- Location: Thorpe in Balne, Doncaster; England
- Coordinates: 53.58787°N 1.12189°W
- Grid reference: SE582105
- Platforms: 2

Other information
- Status: Disused

History
- Pre-grouping: North Eastern Railway (UK)

Key dates
- 1920: opened
- 1950s: closed
Location

Joan Croft Halt railway station was a small halt on the East Coast Main Line (ECML) situated by a level crossing at Joan Croft Junction in South Yorkshire, England. The junction gives access from the ECML to the Skellow line of the West Riding and Grimsby Railway and eventually to Hull, Immingham and Grimsby Docks.

== History ==
The halt consisted of two flanking platforms to the south of the level crossing, with brick-built station buildings on the York-bound (Down) side. These buildings still stand in private use. The station was set in the countryside, with just a few cottages situated either side at some distance.

The station was not shown in railway timetables as it was only for the use of platelayers and crossing keepers (and their families) to enable them to get into, and out of, Doncaster for weekend shopping.

The station opened c. 1920 and closed in the 1950s.

In May 2011, Network Rail applied to the Infrastructure Planning Commission for permission to construct the North Doncaster Chord to link two lines, the Askern line and the Skellow line, with a viaduct passing above Joan Croft junction. The aim of the project was to eliminate the need to use the ECML for slow-moving, westbound bulk freight trains from the Humber ports, in particular, coal from Immingham to Ferrybridge power station. As part of the proposed works, the Joan Croft level crossing was closed and replaced by a road bridge. Closing the level crossing allowed engineers to lower the overhead wires on the ECML (because the wires no longer had to be higher than the highest road vehicle plus a safety margin), thus allowing the new railway viaduct to be constructed at a lower level. The new 2.0-mile (3.2 km) chord opened to traffic on 1 June 2014.

Preceding station	Historical railways	Following station
Moss; Line open, station closed	North Eastern Railway; East Coast Main Line	Arksey; Line open, station closed
