= Heck railway station =

Disused railway station in North Yorkshire, England

Heck
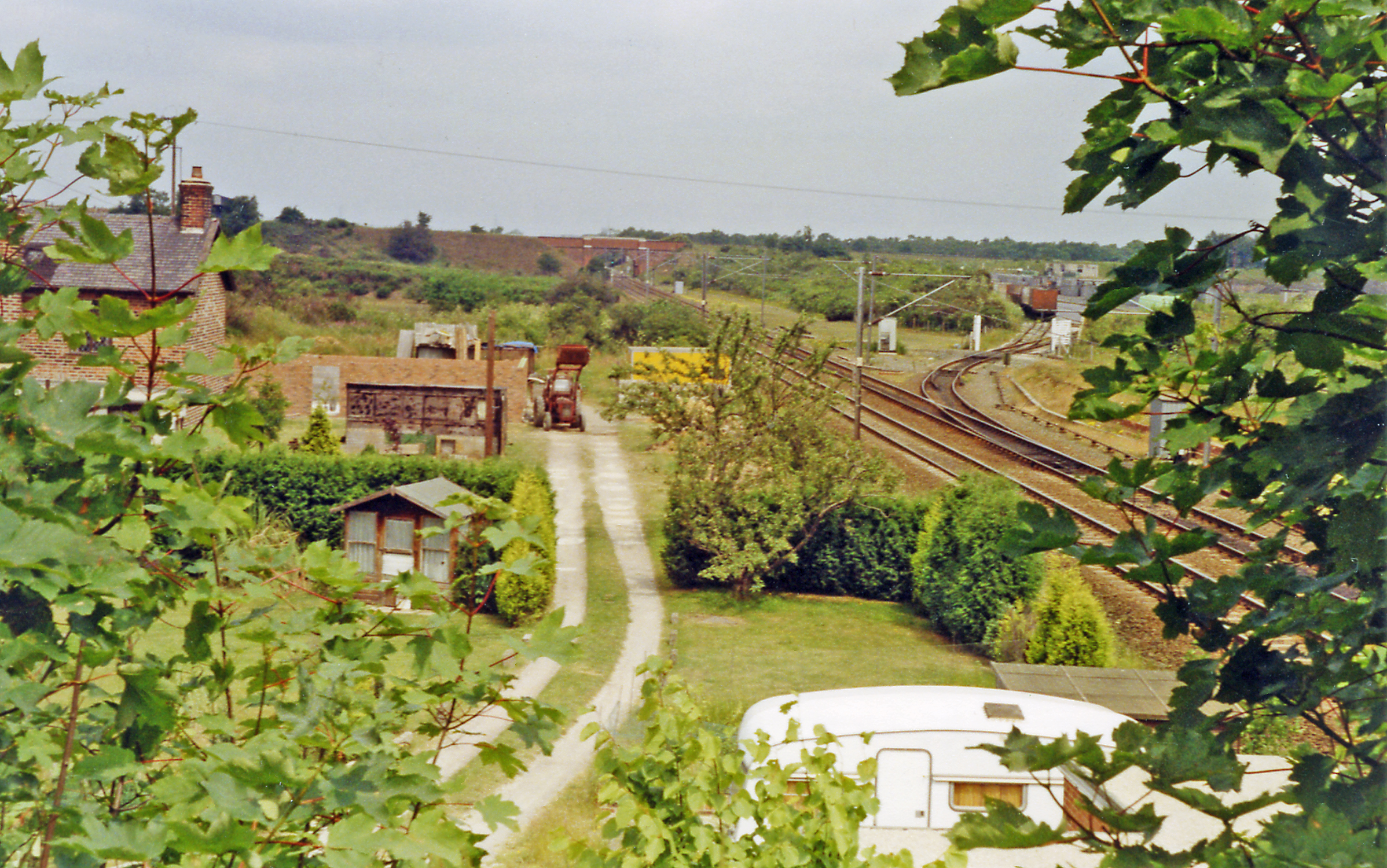
- Site of Heck station in 1992

General information
- Location: Heck, North Yorkshire; England
- Coordinates: 53.6828°N 1.0994°W
- Grid reference: SE595210
- Platforms: 2

Other information
- Status: Disused

History
- Original company: North Eastern Railway
- Pre-grouping: North Eastern Railway
- Post-grouping: LNER

Key dates
- 2 January 1871: Opened
- 15 September 1958: Closed to passengers
- 1963: Closed to goods
Location

Heck railway station served the parish of Heck, North Yorkshire, England from 1871 to 1963 on the East Coast Main Line.

== History ==
The station opened on 2 January 1871 by the North Eastern Railway. It closed to passengers on 15 September 1958 and to goods on 29 April 1963. Sidings still served local companies producing building materials.

The opening of RAF Snaith in 1941, increased the passenger traffic to and from the station. No. 51 Squadron RAF arrived at the station in a special train, where the carriages where shunted into the sidings for unloading. One of the carriages ran back onto the main line and caused a blockage.

On 28 February 2001, a car with a trailer missed the motorway bridge south of the station site and ran on the railway tracks, causing the crash of a southbound intercity train and a northbound freight train which left ten people dead.

Preceding station	Historical railways	Following station
Temple Hirst; Line open, station closed	North Eastern Railway; East Coast Main Line	Balne; Line open, station closed
