= Temple Hirst railway station =

Disused railway station in North Yorkshire, England

Temple Hirst
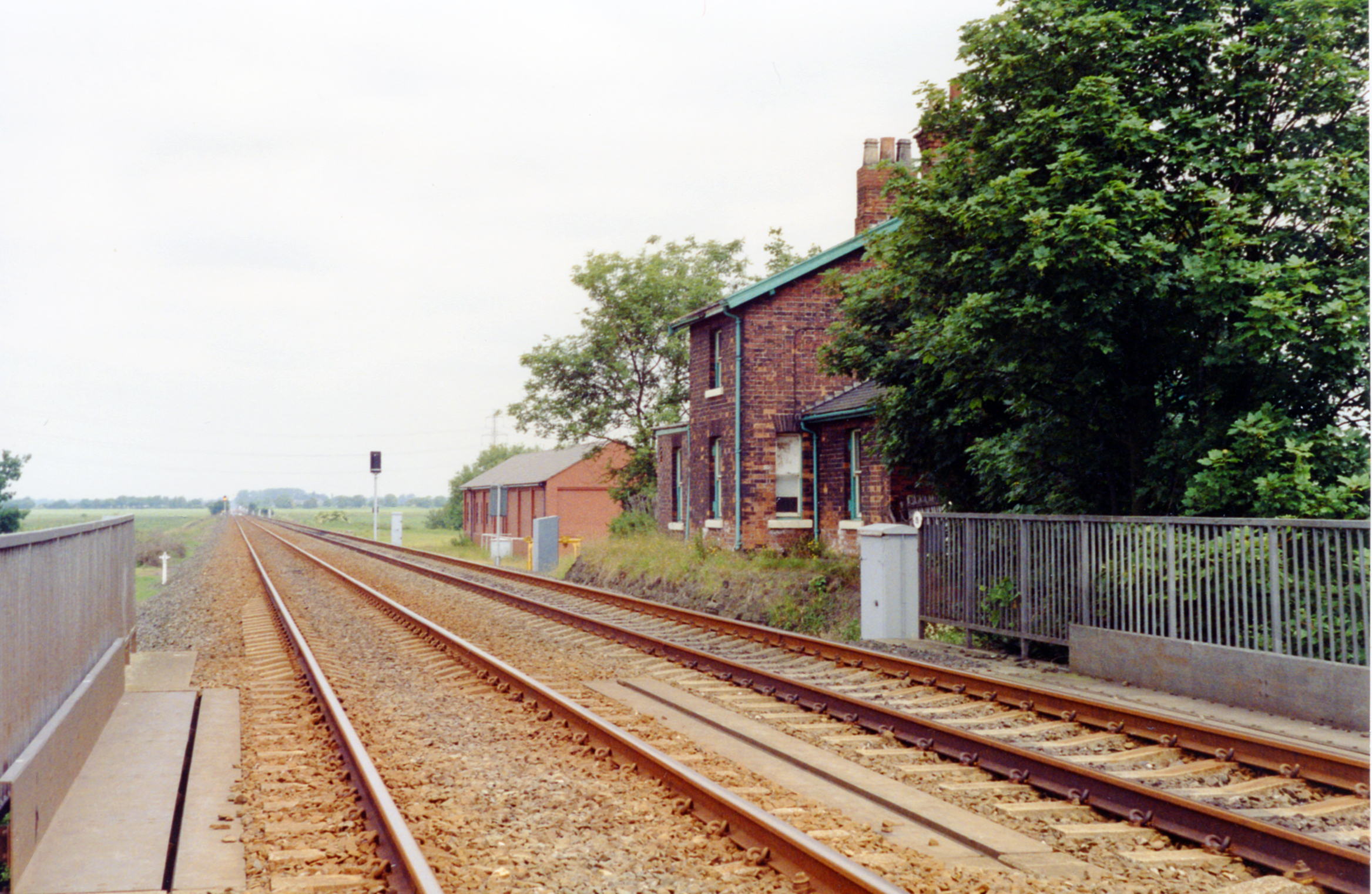
- The former station in 1992

General information
- Location: Temple Hirst, North Yorkshire; England
- Coordinates: 53.7179°N 1.0893°W
- Grid reference: SE602250
- Platforms: 2

Other information
- Status: Disused

History
- Original company: North Eastern Railway
- Pre-grouping: North Eastern Railway
- Post-grouping: LNER

Key dates
- 2 January 1871: Opened
- 6 March 1961: Closed to passengers
- 1964: Closed completely
Location

Temple Hirst railway station served the village of Temple Hirst, North Yorkshire, England from 1871 to 1964 on the East Coast Main Line.

== History ==
The station was opened on 2 January 1871 by the North Eastern Railway. It was closed on 6 March 1961 and closed to goods traffic in 1964.

Preceding station	Historical railways	Following station
Selby; Line and station open	North Eastern Railway; East Coast Main Line	Heck; Line open, station closed
