= Riccall =

Village and civil parish in North Yorkshire, England

Coordinates: 53°50′00″N 1°03′34″W

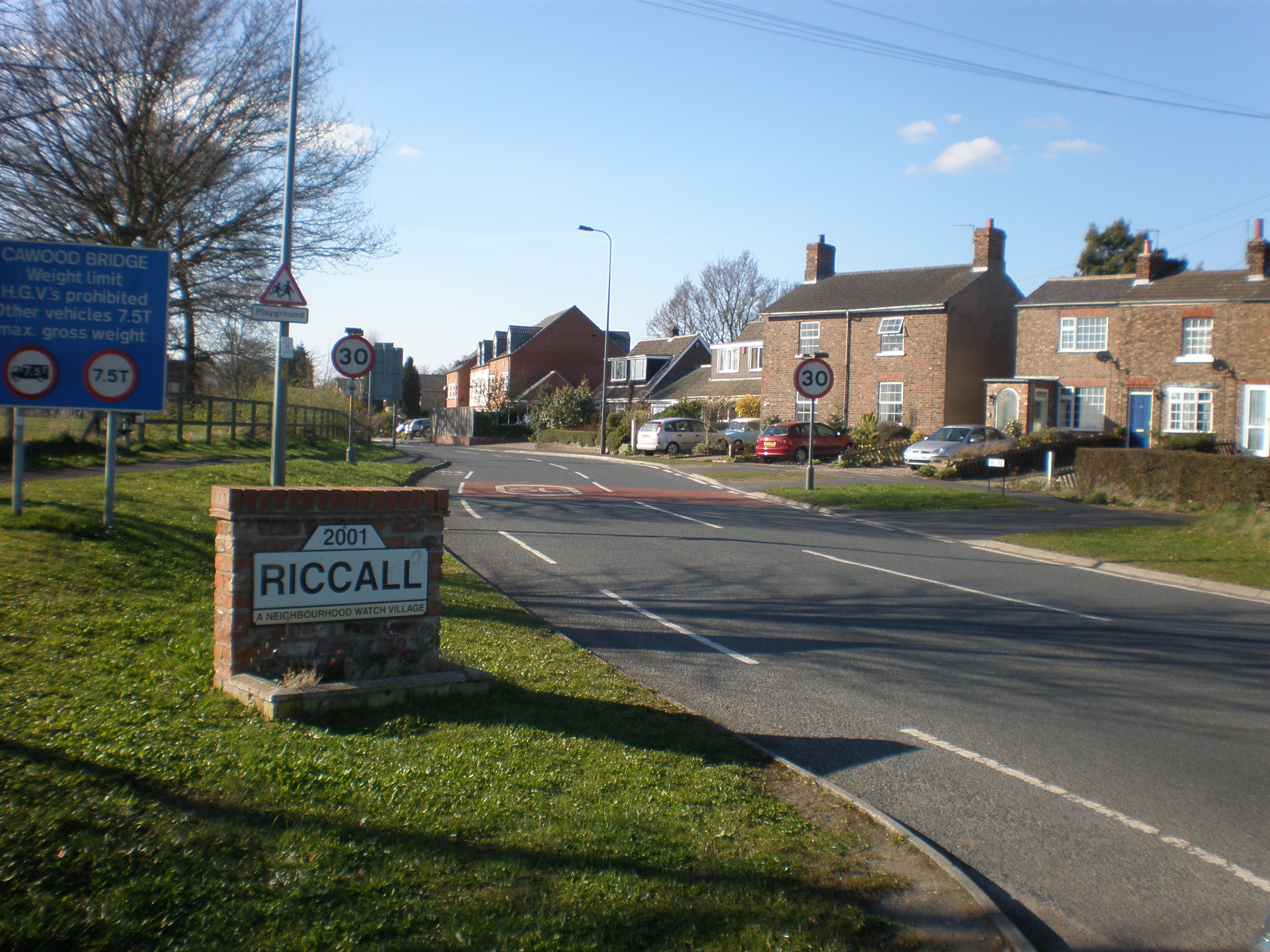
- Entrance to Riccall

- Location within North Yorkshire
- Population: 2,332 (2011 census)
- OS grid reference: SE620376
  - London: 165 mi (266 km) S
- Unitary authority: North Yorkshire
- Ceremonial county: North Yorkshire
- Region: Yorkshire and the Humber
- Country: England
- Sovereign state: United Kingdom
- Post town: YORK
- Postcode district: YO19
- Police: North Yorkshire
- Fire: North Yorkshire
- Ambulance: Yorkshire
- UK Parliament: Selby

Riccall is a village and civil parish in North Yorkshire, England, lying 3.5 miles (6 km) to the north of Selby and 9 miles (14 km) south of York. Riccall is noted for being the place where Harold Hardrada's force of invaders landed in 1066, just before the Battle of Stamford Bridge. In the Second World War, an RAF base was built East of the village, and between the late 1970s and the early 2000s, coal was mined from beneath the village as Riccall Mine, part of the Selby Coalfield.

According to the 2011 census the parish had a total population of 2,332.

== Governance ==
Riccall is a major part of the electoral ward called Riccall with Escrick. The total population of this ward at the 2011 census was 4,312.

It was historically part of the East Riding of Yorkshire, but from 1974 to 2023 was in the Selby District of the shire county of North Yorkshire. In 2023 the district was abolished and North Yorkshire became a unitary authority.

== Geology and geography ==
The settlement of Riccall lies on the Humberhead Levels. At the end of the last ice age about 10,000 years ago Riccall lay underneath the very large Glacial Lake Humber. This gives the area its characteristic light sandy soil. Riccall is the finishing point of the 10-kilometre (6.2 mi) Cycle the Solar System route which follows the Selby−York cycle track starting in Dringhouses, York. The cycle track used to form the old route of the East Coast Main Line via Selby, and Riccall station served the village until 1964.

== History ==
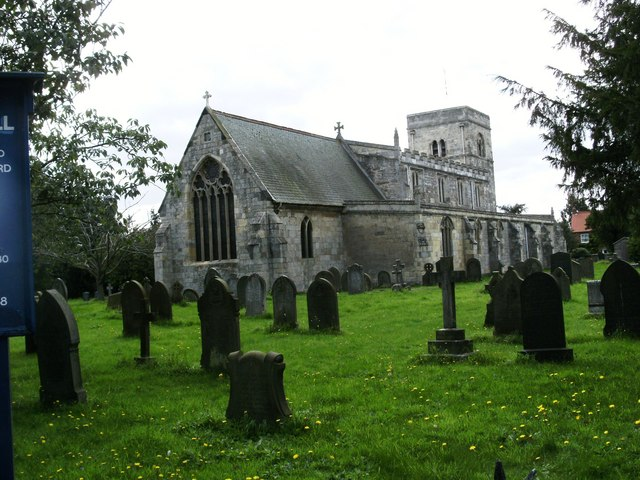
St Mary's Church

Homo sapiens first arrived in Great Britain around 12,000 years ago as the earth was warming before the beginning of the Holocene era. It is not known when Man first arrived in the area, however there is evidence that the Humberhead Levels have been settled for several thousand years, and that the drier northern area where Riccall is situated was settled before the Roman era being host to Iron Age burial sites.

=== Saxons and Danes ===
The village was the site of an Anglo-Saxon settlement and there is evidence of a Saxon church on the site of the current St Mary's Church. The early settlers most likely chose the site because of two geographical factors: the area forms a slightly raised plateau above a flood plain, and it is near the Ouse.

Riccall was the site of the base camp of Harald Hardrada in 1066. He landed on the banks of the Ouse after sailing up the Humber Estuary and set up camp at Riccall before his victory in the Battle of Fulford. However this was to be his last taste of victory, as his army was defeated shortly afterwards by the forces of King Harold Godwinson of England with the false parlay and preceding battle at Stamford Bridge, with many of his troops back at the base camp the battle was short and Hardrada himself died. This battle had a knock-on effect as it distracted Harold from the defence of the south coast and left the land open to Norman invasion. The event is commemorated in one of Riccall's streets, now a footpath, named after Olaf who looked after the camp in Harald's absence, and in Danes Hills, so named for its tumuli. There is now a small information panel about the event at the bottom of Landing Lane, approximately where the Danes moored.

=== Normans ===
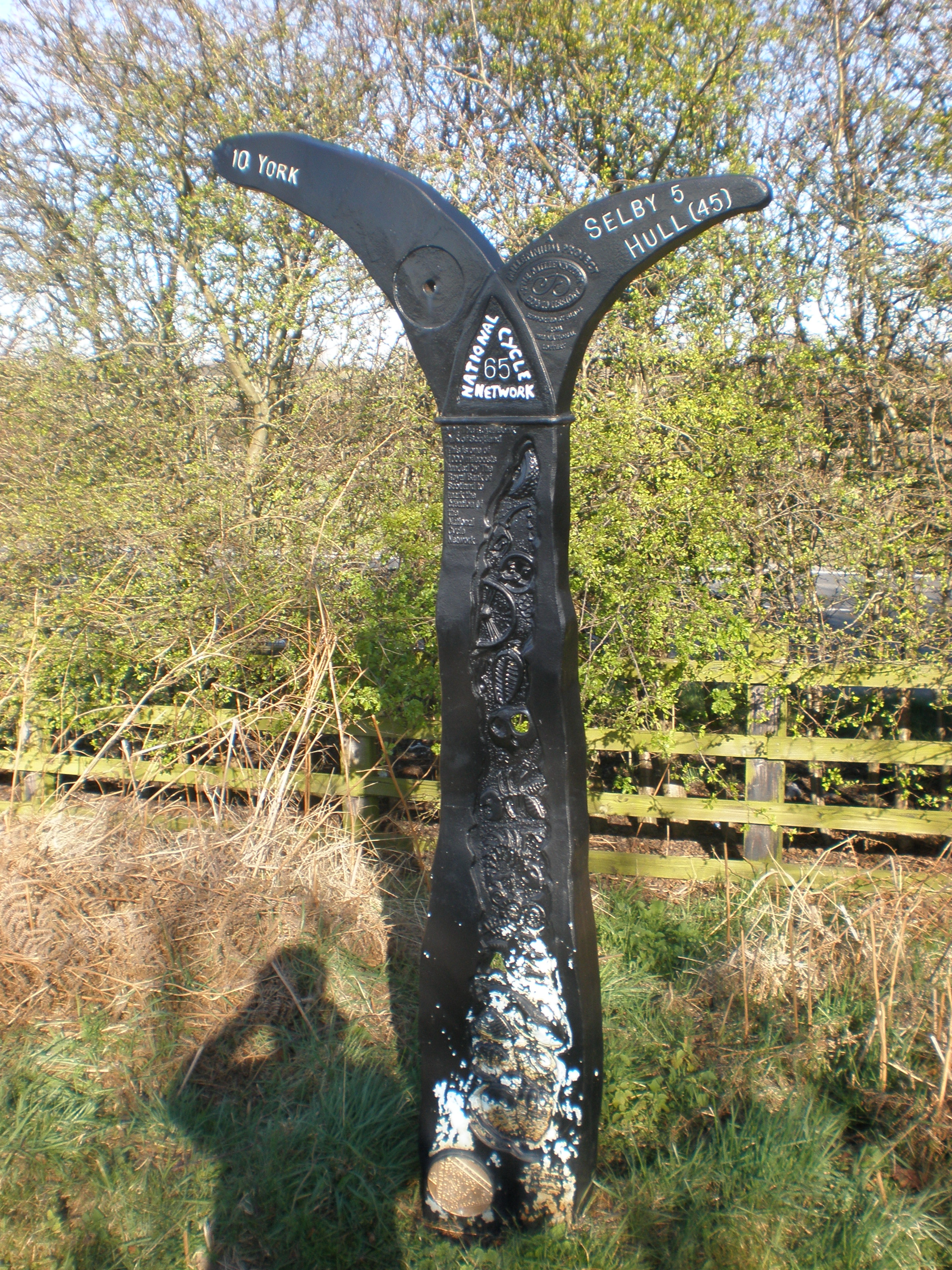
Riccall Cycle Path distance marker

The settlement is recorded in the Domesday Book of 1086 as Richale, having a manor, 27 villagers, ploughlands and meadowlands. The population places it within the top 40% of listings in the whole of the Domesday Book. The name was recorded in the Domesday Book as Richale, then as Richenhale in 1190, as Rikinhal in 1230, and Rycall in 1539. The first part is from a personal name (Rica) and the suffix halh, meaning a nook of land.

Sometime in the latter half of the twelfth century, the current St Mary's was built using stone quarried from the Magnesian Limestone ridge which lies approximately 8 miles (13 km) to the west. The old south door of the church has a carved Romanesque arch, and its 12th-century three-stage tower has Norman double window openings.

=== RAF Riccall ===
Land to the north-east of the village was requisitioned in 1940 for a new airfield, and construction began in 1941. RAF Riccall was used by 76 and 78 Squadrons of the RAF and two Heavy conversion units. It was used for flying between 1942 and 1945, thereafter it was used as an ammunition store until final closure in 1957.

=== Riccall Mine ===
Between 1983 and 2004 the village was home to UK Coal's Riccall Mine which was part of the Selby Coalfield. The colliery, located south-east of Riccall, closed in 2004. The site of the colliery was re-developed as a business park.

== Community ==
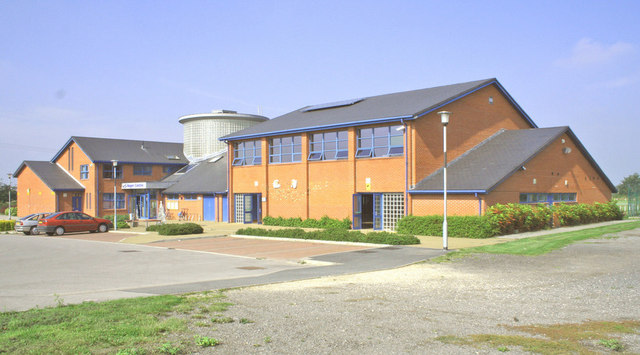
The Regen Centre

The village has a primary school, post office, NISA store, hairdresser/beauty salon, two pubs, an Italian restaurant and the Regen Centre, an award-winning conference, events, and community facility. The Regen Centre, which opened in September 2000, houses a bar, four outdoor tennis courts, and a small sports hall where football and badminton can be played.

The village has its own traditional Long Sword dance group, who have performed with other teams at sword dance events nation and worldwide. The dance is similar to the one acted out by the Goathland Plough Stots, and consists of eight to twelve dancers holding wooden swords in their left hands. A manuscript detailing the songs, dances, moves and characters within the dance, was first recorded in the 1880s.

== See also ==
- Listed buildings in Riccall
