= Selby Coalfield =

Mine complex based around Selby, North Yorkshire, England

Selby coalfield
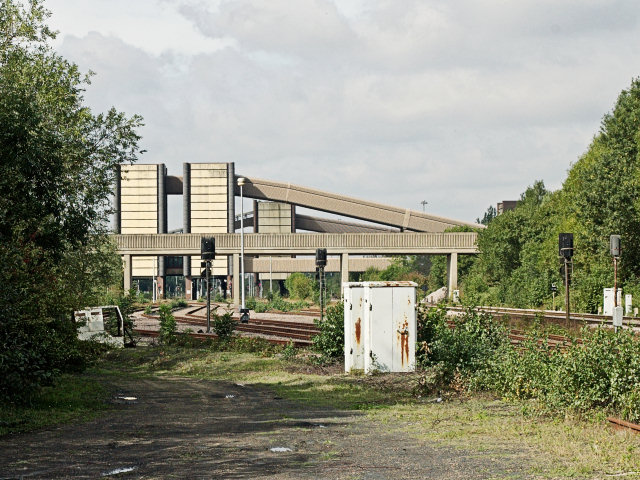
- Gascoigne Wood, conveyors and rail wagon loading bays (2006)

- Location in North Yorkshire
- Location: Selby, North Yorkshire, England, North Yorkshire, United Kingdom; 53.78004°N 1.20709°W
- Products: Coal
- Production: 12 million tonnes per year
- Financial year: 1993–94
- Type: Underground
- Opened: 1976
- Closed: 2004
- Company: UK Coal

Selby coalfield (also known as the Selby complex or Selby superpit) was a large-scale deep underground mine complex based around Selby, North Yorkshire, England, developed by the National Coal Board in the 1970s. With pitheads at Wistow Mine, Stillingfleet Mine, Riccall Mine, North Selby Mine, Whitemoor Mine and Gascoigne Wood Mine. All coal was brought to the surface and treated at Gascoigne Wood before being distributed by rail. To protect rail services the East Coast Main Line was diverted on the Selby Diversion.

Production began in 1983, and peaked in 1993–94 at 12 million tonnes per year, about 45 percent of United Kingdom deep-mined production, and the complex produced over 121 million tonnes in total before closure. The mines were acquired by RJB Mining (later UK Coal) in 1997 after the privatisation of the coal industry. Withdrawal of financial subsidy, geological problems and low United Kingdom coal prices made the complex unprofitable by the early 21st century. Closure was announced in 2002 and mining ceased by 2004.

== History ==
=== Background and planning, 1960s–1976 ===
Exploration in the 1960s and early 1970s identified a northern extension of the Barnsley Seam between 1.9 and 3.25 m thick, with an estimate of 600 million tonnes in that seam and total reserves of around 2,000 million tonnes. Because open extraction would have required a stripping ratio of about 500:1, underground mining was chosen. A report, Coal reserves in the Selby Area, appeared in 1972. Planning permission was sought in 1974 and granted in 1976 after objections including concerns about subsidence and flooding. Extraction was limited to the Barnsley seam, though other seams were present.

In the early 1970s national energy planning favoured large, modern units over investment in older collieries. The Selby scheme was advanced as a high-productivity complex with a deliberately small surface footprint in the Vale of York, achieved by concentrating surface plant at Gascoigne Wood and linking the five mines underground. The planned conveyor drifts from Wistow and Riccall to Gascoigne Wood were about 10 kilometres (6.2 mi) and 12 kilometres (7.5 mi) long respectively, part of an underground network that would eventually extend for hundreds of kilometres.

=== Development and design, 1976–1983 ===
In 1974, the Labour Government and National Coal Board (NCB), backed by the National Union of Mineworkers (NUM) launched the Plan for Coal after the 1973 oil crisis. The plan continued the closure of older pits while investing in new capacity, and the Selby coalfield was a major element of it.

As part of the construction programme, the NCB paid for diversion of the East Coast Main Line away from Selby to avoid areas at risk of mining subsidence (see Selby Diversion). Above-ground equipment such as winding gear was enclosed and kept relatively low to limit visual impact in the rural landscape. Shafts were sunk in the late 1970s and Wistow Mine began production in 1983.

The project was formally inaugurated by the Duchess of Kent in 1976. Initial estimates were a construction cost of £400 million and a workforce of 4,000, with extraction starting in the early 1980s, lasting about 40 years and producing 10 million tonnes per year. The scheme used an unusual arrangement: five satellite pits to the east (Wistow, North Selby, Riccall, Stillingfleet and Whitemoor) transferred coal by tunnel to the drift mine at Gascoigne Wood, where all coal was brought to the surface and processed.

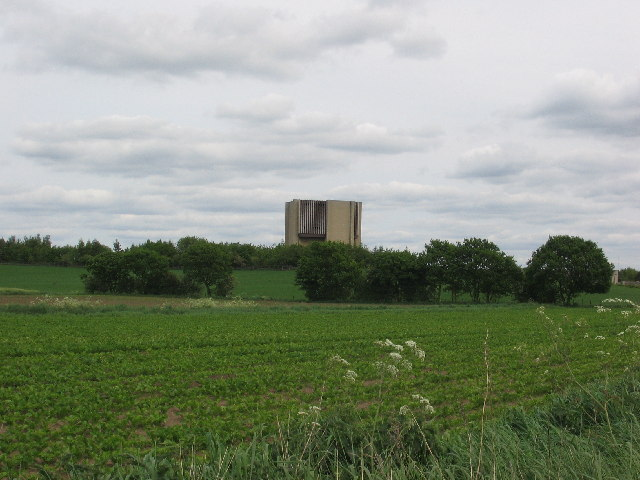
Wistow Mine, cladding covered pit head (2005)

The workforce was planned from the outset to be transferred from 11 collieries nearing exhaustion around Wakefield and Rothwell, starting in 1978–79 with miners from Walton Colliery near Wakefield. The transfer programme was due by 1986, but the Nostell miners did not arrive until 1987 and the process finished with the transfer of Sharlston miners in 1993. Large car parks were built to support commuting.

=== Operations and output, 1983–1994 ===
Production began at Wistow in 1983. The five pits at Wistow, Riccall, Stillingfleet, North Selby and Whitemoor supplied coal by long underground conveyor drifts to the central surface site at Gascoigne Wood, where all coal was raised, prepared and dispatched by rail.

Output ramped up through the late 1980s and early 1990s. From 1984 to 1994, reaching 10 million tonnes per year in 1992–93, and peaking at 12 million tonnes per year in 1993–94, about 45 percent of United Kingdom deep-mined output for that year.

The underground haulage system was engineered for high continuous throughput. It was Europe’s longest mine conveyor network, with more than 25 kilometres (16 mi) of belting linking the faces to Gascoigne Wood. The principal steel-cord belt was reported as 1,300 millimetres (51 in) wide and 28 millimetres (1.1 in) thick, running at about 8.4 m/s (30 km/h; 28 ft/s; 19 mph) and rated to carry roughly 3,200 t/h (870 long ton/ks), total installed drive power was quoted at about 10.1 MW (13,500 hp) with a computerised monitoring system to detect belt damage.

=== Industrial relations and the 1984–85 strike ===
The 1984–85 miners’ strike disrupted operations across British coalfields. At Selby there were mass pickets and large police deployments at the complex’s sites, including Gascoigne Wood, Riccall and Whitemoor. No coal was produced in 1984–85 during the UK miners' strike (1984–1985). Gascoigne Wood saw clashes between pickets and police. Production recovered in the following years as the complex moved toward its 1993–94 peak.

=== Ownership, economics and geology, 1994–2002 ===
The Coal Industry Act 1994 created the legal framework for the break-up of British Coal. In 1995 the coalfield was acquired by RJB Mining, later UK Coal. Whitemoor Mine was merged with Riccall Mine in 1996 and North Selby Mine with Stillingfleet Mine in 1997. By 2000, production was 4.4 million tonnes per year.

Between 1995 and 1999 the operation moved from profit to loss, with the first loss recorded in 1999. Relatively fixed costs associated with the single out-loading point at Gascoigne Wood meant profitability fell as production reduced across the five pits. By 2000 the loss was £30 million per year and no subsidy was received.

Geology constrained the complex during its later years. The main working was in the Barnsley seam beneath the Vale of York, at depths of roughly 390 to 1,040 m (1,280 to 3,410 ft). A small area of Stanley Main was also worked east of Riccall. The British Geological Survey describes “geological complications” in the Selby district and records that they were among the reasons for closure later in 2004.

=== Decline and closure, 2002–2004 ===
By early 2002 ministers told Parliament that output from the complex had fallen and that losses were being recorded, noting that the surface plant and rail out-loading at Gascoigne Wood carried high standing costs sized for five producing mines, which pushed up unit costs as production fell.

In 2002 UK Coal announced that the complex would close in 2003–04, and mining ended in 2004 at Wistow (May), Stillingfleet (July) and Riccall (October). The total amount of coal mined was 121 million tonnes. In 2004 production was wound down in stages and the complex closed.

=== Post closure ===
The Gascoigne Wood Mine site is the largest of the former pits, with 44 ha (110 acres) of developable land and the best rail connection, including sidings for trains of up to 775 m on the former Leeds and Selby Railway (Leeds–Hull line). On-site utilities include a 58 MW electrical grid connection. The site lies close to Sherburn-in-Elmet Industrial Estate and directly south of Sherburn-in-Elmet Airfield. Planning permission for the re-use of buildings and infrastructure was granted in 2007. Beginning in 2008 part of the site was used on short-term lease to British Gypsum for storage of gypsum from Drax Power Station produced by flue-gas desulfurization. The site was also proposed as a rail vehicle manufacturing location (Hitachi, rejected 2010) and as the focus for an eco-town proposal rejected by Selby District Council in 2008.

The Whitemoor and North Selby sites were converted to mixed commercial use as business parks by December 2005. Riccall Mine has been converted to an industrial and office development, planning permission was granted in 2007.

At North Selby Mine a renewable energy site using waste as feedstock was proposed in 2009, by 2011 the proposals emphasised anaerobic digestion and in-vessel composting.

At Stillingfleet Mine, redevelopment as a waste sorting centre has been sought.

As of early 2012 Wistow Mine had not been redeveloped. Harworth Group has pursued regeneration that uses the legacy on-site utilities, including a 12 MW electrical grid connection, with the aim of creating an industrial park. As of 2022 the site has not been redeveloped and is used as a storage facility for redundant HGV trailers.

== Locations ==
- 53.89101°N 1.01557°W North Selby Mine, about 1 mile (1.6 km) northeast of Escrick.
- 53.81472°N 0.99131°W Whitemoor Mine, about 2.5 miles (4 km) east-northeast of Barlby.
- 53.81247°N 1.12971°W Wistow Mine, about 1 mile (1.6 km) west of Wistow.
- 53.82493°N 1.03243°W Riccall Mine, about 1 mile (1.6 km) southeast of Riccall.
- 53.85706°N 1.08474°W Stillingfleet Mine, about 0.6 miles (1 km) southeast of Stillingfleet.
- 53.78004°N 1.20709°W Gascoigne Wood Mine, about 1.8 miles (3 km) east of South Milford, rail-connected to the Leeds and Selby Railway east of the junction with the former York and North Midland Railway York to Castleford line.

== See also ==
- Coal mining in the United Kingdom
- Durham Coalfield
- South Yorkshire Coalfield
- List of coal mines in the United Kingdom
