= Selby Diversion =

UK railway line

- Routes of the ECML, Selby diversion is northern half of the 1983 route (Black)

Overview
- Other name: Selby Deviation
- Owner: Network Rail
- Line number: LN600
- Termini: Temple Hirst Jn; Colton Jn
- Stations: None

Service
- Services: ECML
- Route number: ECM3

History
- Opened: 1983 by British Rail

Technical
- Line length: 13.79 mi (22.19 km)13 mi 63 ch
- Track gauge: 4 ft 8 1/2 in (1,435 mm)
- Operating speed: 201 km/h (125 mph)

The Selby Diversion is a mainline railway in the United Kingdom, built as a new part of the East Coast Main Line (ECML) to avoid an area of potential subsidence over the newly discovered Selby Coalfield.

The line opened in 1983, running roughly northwest from a junction on the ECML near Temple Hirst, south of Selby, to a junction near Church Fenton, south of York.

As of 2015, the line is used primarily by long-distance north–south services, as well as some freight trains. Most freight trains have been diverted from the line by the opening of the North Doncaster Chord project which was completed in June 2014.

== Description ==
From the northern end, the line runs off a junction with the southwesterly former York and North Midland Railway mainline from York south to Church Fenton and Brotherton; the line turns south, crossing the River Wharfe. At the Leeds and Selby Line, the line travels under the east–west railway, with junctions allowing trains from York to continue east to Selby, and trains from the south to continue west to Leeds (see Hambleton junction). The line then runs southeast to a junction with the former York and Doncaster branch Line (Selby to Doncaster section), joining the line at a junction near the village of Temple Hirst, just south of its crossing of the River Aire.

The line forms part of the East Coast Main Line (ECML), and part of section Network Rail's SRS (Strategic Route Section) G.07 track section (Colton junction-Doncaster) as line number LN600. The line is electrified at 25 kV AC using Mark 3b equipment, the route availability is 10, loading gauge is W9, and maximum permissible speed is 125 miles per hour (201 km/h). The line is signalled using multiple aspect signalling under Track Circuit Block regulations.

=== Usage ===
As of 2015, the line has approximately 4 north–south long-distance trains per hour.

== History ==
In the 1970s, the National Coal Board (NCB) began development of a new underground mining complex in the area around Selby, North Yorkshire, the Selby Coalfield; because of the risks to trains from mining subsidence, a diversionary route for the ECML was built, paid for by the NCB. After opening by British Rail in 1983, ECML trains no longer called or passed through Selby, instead leaving the former ECML at Temple Hirst junction and connecting with the former York and North Midland Railway line to York at Colton junction near Church Fenton. The NCB made the proposal in 1974, and, following a planning inquiry in 1975, received consent in 1976.

Evidence at the planning inquiry showed that the mine would (in the local geological context of a high water table, and sand substrata) lead to unpredictable subsidence on the line from Selby to York (ECML), and as such would render the line unsafe for a high-speed service. The inquiry recommended that the line be re-sited.

Proceedings for an act to enable a new line began in 1977. (Note: See "British Railways (Selby)". London Gazette (47400): 15261. 6 December 1977. and Times & 1 December 1977, p. 24)) At the parliamentary reading of the bill, it was claimed that the alternative of leaving a mile wide bed of coal unmined underneath the line would represent a loss of £500–800 million. The act was passed in 1979, the British Railways (Selby) Act, 1979. (Note: British Railways (Selby) Act (Elizabeth 11. 1979 Cap.x); An Act to empower the British Railways Board to construct works and to acquire lands in the district of Selby in the County of North Yorkshire; to confer further powers on the Board; and for other purposes) Due to the long timescale of the planning process, the full design and construction phase was required to be carried out in four years (by 1983 (Note: The progress of the drift mine was scheduled to reach the land under the railway towards the end of 1983.)).

The line's design was for an operation speed of 125 mph (201 km/h), initially opening at 60 mph (100 km/h), with the line speed to be progressively raised. The railway line used standard concrete sleepers at 650 millimetres (26 in) spacing with rails of weight 54 kg/m. The junction at Colton used a fixed nosed crossings at an angle of 1.77°. The line included chords to allow running from the Leeds-Selby Line. The estimated project cost was £60 million, of which £48.4 million was for civil engineering.

Construction was formally started on 29 July 1980, in the presence of Glynn England (CEGB), Peter Parker (BR), and Derek Ezra (NCB). The work was undertaken by A. Monk & Company Ltd and was completed 3 months ahead of schedule, formally opening on 3 October 1983, at a final cost of £63 million. Diesel Multiple Units running from Hull to York began using the line on 16 May 1983, and InterCity train services began running on the line from 3 October.

The line was the first purpose-built section of high-speed railway in the UK having a design speed of 125 mph; however, research by British Rail in the 1990s indicated that the route geometry would permit up to 160 mph operation, subject to the necessary overhead line equipment and signalling upgrades. The new line also avoided the speed restriction over the swing bridge at Selby. The former ECML route, the NER's 1871 York and Doncaster branch line, was closed from Selby northwards. (Note: Hoole (1986) states that the line south of Selby was single track, possibly incorrectly.)
