= Askern railway station =

Disused railway station in South Yorkshire, England

Askern
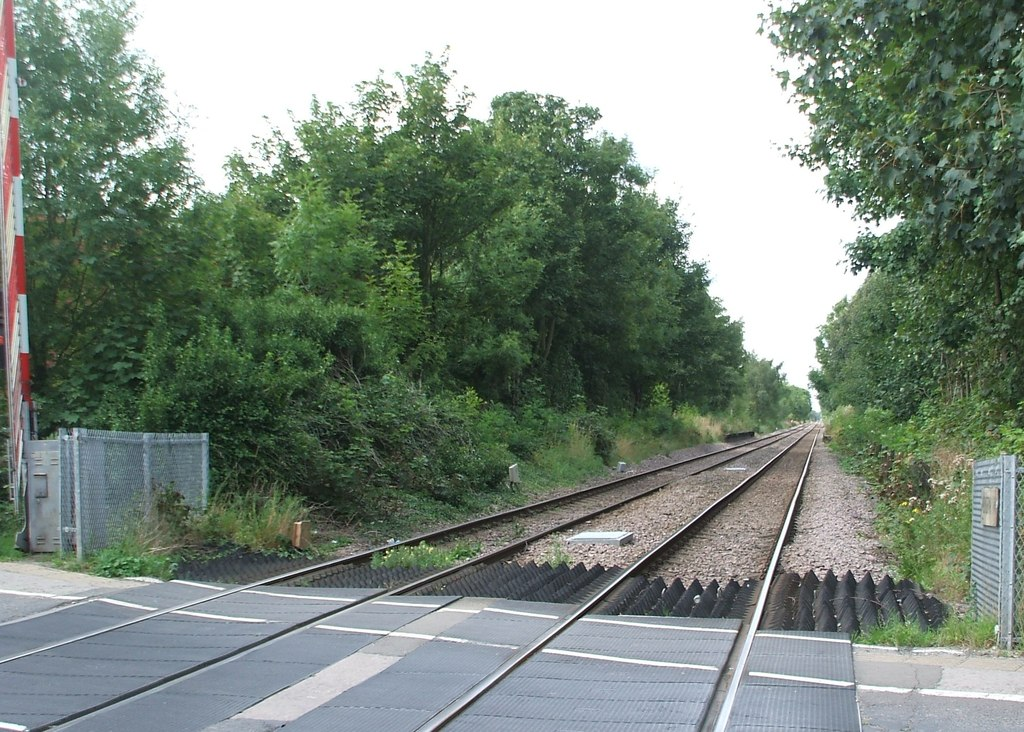
- SIte of the former station in August 2008

General information
- Location: Askern, Doncaster; England
- Coordinates: 53.61649°N 1.14885°W
- Grid reference: SE564136
- Platforms: 2

Other information
- Status: Disused

History
- Original company: Wakefield, Pontefract and Goole Railway
- Pre-grouping: Lancashire and Yorkshire Railway
- Post-grouping: London Midland and Scottish Railway

Key dates
- 6 June 1848: Station opens
- 10 March 1947: Partial closure
- 27 September 1948: Closure to regular passengers
- 5 October 1964: Closure to station goods
- 1984: Complete station closure
Location

Askern railway station was a station on the Askern branch line of the former Lancashire & Yorkshire Railway between Doncaster and Knottingley. It served the town of Askern in South Yorkshire, England.

== History ==
The branch line of the Wakefield, Pontefract and Goole Railway (WP&GR) between Knottingley (on the WP&GR) and Askern Junction (on the London and York Railway, a predecessor of the Great Northern Railway) was authorised on 16 July 1846. It opened on 6 June 1848, and Askern, 8 miles (13 km) from Knottingley, was one of the original stations. In the meantime, the WP&GR had amalgamated with the Manchester and Leeds Railway and others on 9 July 1847 to form the Lancashire and Yorkshire Railway (L&YR). The L&YR became part of the London Midland and Scottish Railway during the Grouping of 1923. The station was closed to regular passenger traffic from 10 March 1947, and to all passenger traffic from 27 September 1948. It remained open for goods traffic until October 1964. The station was passed over to the Eastern Region of British Railways on nationalisation. It had been reopened for limited service by 3 August 1980 but was subsequently last used in 1984 and the platforms removed.

== The site today ==
Trains still pass the site as the line is still open for freight traffic, and since 23 May 2010, regular passenger trains operated by Grand Central pass through to and from London King's Cross. In September 2008, as part of Doncaster Borough Councils report on rail corridors in the borough Askern, along with seven other sites, was listed as one of the stations suitable for reopening in the future.

== Potential reopening ==
In late 2015 the reopening of the station was raised by the residents of Askern. They presented the petition to the Mayor of Doncaster Ros Jones. Due to the building of two semi-detached properties and two blocks of flats being built next to the original foundations of the station the place for the potential rebuild would have to be moved to a more convenient space.

In March 2020, a bid was made to the Restoring Your Railway fund to get funds for a feasibility study into reinstating the line and station through Askern to local passenger trains. This bid was unsuccessful.

Preceding station	Historical railways	Following station
Arksey; Line open, station closed	London Midland and Scottish Railway; Lancashire & Yorkshire Railway; Askern branch line	Norton; Line open, station closed
