= 1947 Doncaster rail crash =

1947 railway accident in Doncaster, England

Coordinates: 53°30′48″N 1°08′22.2″W

Details
- Date: 9 August 1947
- Location: Doncaster railway station 156 mi (251 km) N from London
- Country: England
- Line: East Coast Main Line
- Operator: London & North Eastern Railway
- Cause: Signalman's error

Statistics
- Trains: 2
- Passengers: 1,400 (estimated)
- Deaths: 18
- Injured: 188

The 1947 Doncaster rail crash was a fatal rail incident that occurred just south of Doncaster station at Bridge Junction. A train was signalled onto an occupied line and the ensuing collision resulted in 18 deaths and 188 injuries. Both trains and signalling were operated by the London & North Eastern Railway (LNER).

== Accident ==
At 4:41 pm on 9 August 1947, the 1:25 pm King's Cross to Leeds train (14 coaches) ran into the back of the 1:10 pm King's Cross to Leeds train (12 coaches) between Balby Junction signal box and Bridge Junction. The site was approximately 0.75 miles (1.21 km) south of Doncaster station and in the same area as the rail crash of 1951. The last three coaches of the first train were almost completely destroyed by the (estimated) 40-mile-per-hour (64 km/h) crash when the leading locomotive of the 1:25 pm, a Gresley V2, crashed into the rear of the preceding train. 700 people were aboard the two trains with casualties amounting to 18 dead and 188 injured (51 were taken to hospital). Local people came to assist where they could, and their efforts were acknowledged by the LNER.

== Cause ==
The first train had been brought to a stand at a red signal near to Bridge Junction, and was just starting away when the collision occurred. The second train was incorrectly signalled into the section, resulting in a rear-end collision. It was later determined by the inquiry that neither of the drivers were to blame; it was the signalman at Balby signal box (J W McKone) who had accepted the second express into the section before clearing the first stationary train, even though it was within his sight from the box and was only 177 yards (162 m) away. Traffic had been described as "heavy for a Saturday, but not excessive".
