= Norton railway station (South Yorkshire) =

Disused railway station in South Yorkshire, England

Norton (South Yorkshire)
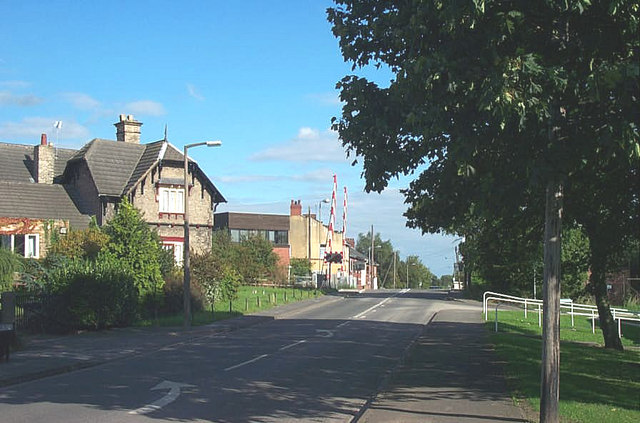
- The level crossing and Old Station House in September 2006

General information
- Location: Norton, Metropolitan Borough of Doncaster, England
- Coordinates: 53.63205°N 1.16237°W
- Grid reference: SE554153
- Platforms: 2

Other information
- Status: Disused

History
- Original company: Wakefield, Pontefract and Goole Railway
- Pre-grouping: Lancashire and Yorkshire Railway
- Post-grouping: London, Midland and Scottish Railway

Key dates
- 6 June 1848: Station opened
- 10 March 1947: Last train
- 27 September 1948: Official closure
Location

Norton (South Yorkshire) railway station served the village of Norton, in South Yorkshire, England.

== History ==
It was built by the Wakefield, Pontefract and Goole Railway on their line between Doncaster and Knottingley. The line and its stations were absorbed into the Lancashire and Yorkshire Railway in 1847, when that company changed its name from the Manchester and Leeds Railway.

The station buildings were similar to those at Womersley and were described as "Swiss Cottage" style. They are a stone built construction with a clipped gable end.

At Grouping, it passed to the London, Midland and Scottish Railway and then on to British Railways on nationalisation in 1948.

The station was closed to passengers on 27 September 1948.

== Route ==
Preceding station	Disused railways	Following station
Askern	London Midland and Scottish Railway; Lancashire & Yorkshire Railway; Askern Branch Line	Womersley

== The site today ==
The railway line through the site is still open and in regular use:

- Freight trains operated by DB Cargo UK, Freightliner and GB Railfreight run to the local power stations of Ferrybridge, Eggborough and Drax
- Passenger services recommenced operation in 2010. Open access operator Grand Central runs on this line on the Bradford Interchange to London King's Cross route.

As part of a report to Doncaster Borough Council in September 2008, the station site was to be protected for future use in a strategy for the railways in the borough; reopening being a distant possibility.
