= Womersley railway station =

Disused railway station in North Yorkshire, England

Womersley
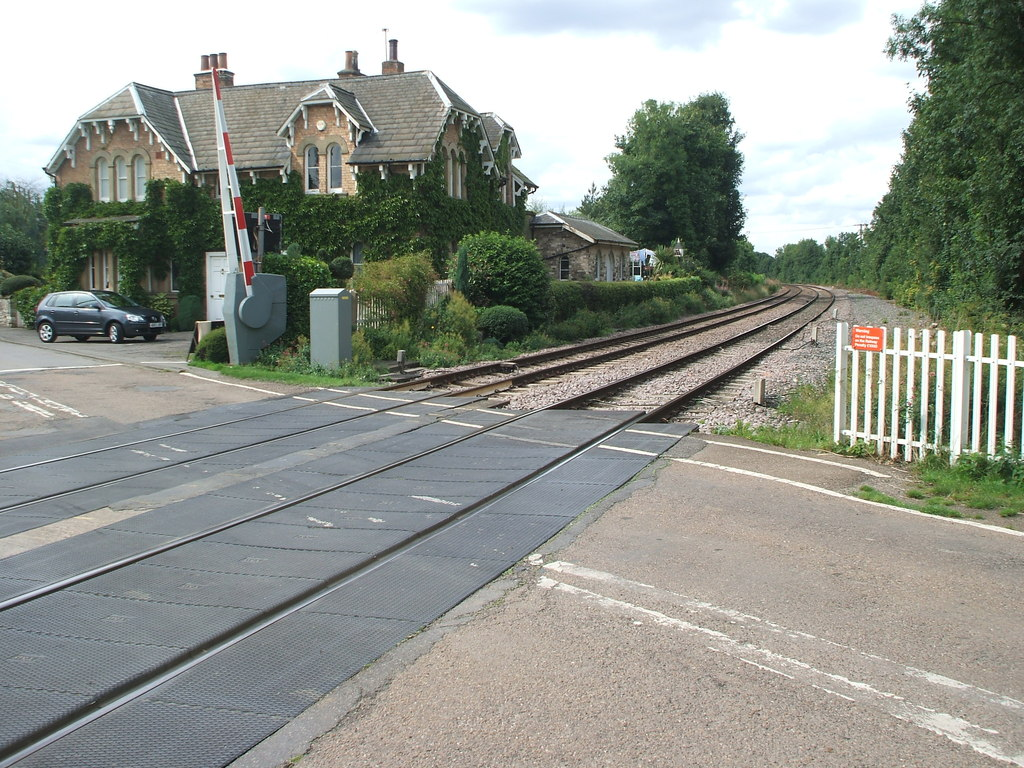
- The level crossing, station house and station building (August 2008)

General information
- Location: Womersley, North Yorkshire, England
- Coordinates: 53.6645°N 1.1885°W
- Platforms: 2

Other information
- Status: Disused

History
- Original company: Wakefield, Pontefract and Goole Railway
- Pre-grouping: Lancashire and Yorkshire Railway
- Post-grouping: London, Midland and Scottish Railway

Key dates
- 6 June 1848: Station opened
- 10 March 1947: Last train
- 27 September 1948: Official closure
Location

Womersley railway station served the village of Womersley, in North Yorkshire, England, between 1848 and 1948.

== History ==
The station was opened on 6 June 1848, as a stop on the Askern Branch Line. It was built by the Lancashire & Yorkshire Railway to provide at link to the Great Northern Railway at Doncaster.

It was closed to passenger traffic on 27 September 1948.

The grand presence and noticeable architecture of the station likely resulted from the Lancashire and Yorkshire Railway's belief that it was in keeping with the village's location. The large "Swiss cottage style" station building is prominent.

The estate at the time of construction in the 1840s belonged to Lord Roche and there were many important visitors to the estate who came by train, including the Queen Mother.

== Route ==
Preceding station	Disused railways	Following station
Norton	London Midland and Scottish Railway; Lancashire & Yorkshire Railway; Askern Branch Line	Knottingley

== The site today ==
The platforms have been demolished and the station house is extant, sited next to the level crossing.

The railway line through the site is still open and in regular use:

- Freight trains operated by DB Cargo UK, Freightliner and GB Railfreight run to the local power stations of Ferrybridge, Eggborough and Drax
- Passenger services recommenced operation in 2010. Open access operator Grand Central runs on this line on the Bradford Interchange to London King's Cross route.
