= North Doncaster Chord =

Railway chord in South Yorkshire, England

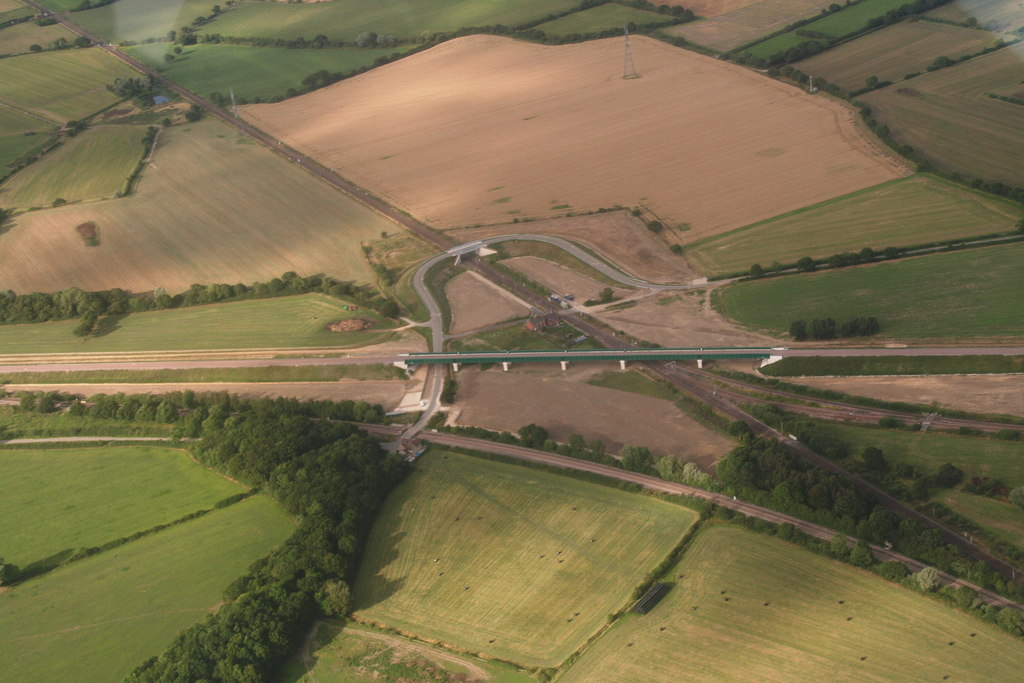
- The green viaduct carries the new Doncaster North Chord over the ECML

Overview
- Other names: Doncaster North Chord; Shaftholme Flyover
- Status: Open
- Owner: Network Rail
- Locale: Owston, South Yorkshire, England
- Coordinates: 53.587°N 1.122°W

Service
- Type: Heavy rail

History
- Commenced: 13 January 2013
- Opened: 1 June 2014; 11 years ago 26 June 2014 (official opening)

Technical
- Line length: 2 miles (3.2 km)
- Number of tracks: 2
- Track gauge: 1,435 mm (4 ft 8 1/2 in) standard gauge

The North Doncaster Chord (also known as the Shaftholme Flyover) is a railway connection (chord) between the freight only lines between Hatfield & Stainforth railway station (the Skellow line) and the Askern branch line, in South Yorkshire, England. The line was built to allow heavy freight trains, mostly from the Port of Immingham, to access the power stations in the lower Aire Valley without the need for them to use the East Coast Main Line (ECML) and creating slower line speeds for faster passenger trains. The chord meant the creation of 2 miles (3.2 km) of new railway and the building of Shaftholme Viaduct, which straddles the East Coast Main Line.

== History ==
Plans for the new section of railway were announced in early autumn 2011, with the expected cost £45 million, and a projection that the new railway would be opened by early 2014. The idea for a diversionary railway to take freight trains away from the East Coast Main Line (ECML) had been proposed for some time, and was included in the Yorkshire and Humber Route Utilisation Strategy in July 2009. The strategy detailed that the diversion was to be undertaken during Network Rail's Control Period 4. In late November 2012, Morgan Sindall announced that they had won the contract to build 2 miles (3.2 km) of double track railway, and a six-span viaduct some 807 feet (246 m) long, and 25 feet (7.7 m) high, over the ECML. The proposal was defined as a nationally significant infrastructure project (NSIP) under the terms of the Planning Act 2008.

Work on the site started in January 2013, with the intention that most of the incoming materials would be delivered by train to a temporary siding located on the old Thorpe Marsh Power Station. However, the Skellow line was cut off from the national network by the Hatfield Landslip one month into the project starting, so most of the bulk fill material had to be delivered to the site by road.

Whilst the chord was constructed to benefit freight movements (the distance between Immingham and the Aire Valley power stations that the freight trains could now take was shortened by 14 miles (23 km) (Note: Previously, a freight train travelling westwards from the Scunthorpe/Immingham area would have taken the Skellow line at Hatfield & Stainforth, and accessed the ECML at Applehurst Junction going north. They would leave the ECML at Hambleton South Junction, and headed westwards along the Selby Line, leaving to go southwards at Milford Junction to head down the Dearne Valley Line to the Aire Valley Power stations.)), passenger services also benefitted greatly due to the freight trains not needing to use the ECML, and thus allowing speed enhancements and the opportunity for more available paths for passenger trains. Between January 2007 and February 2008, over 5,200 freights trains used the old route onto the ECML (typically about 100 trains per week). The use of the chord and the Askern branch line to access the Aire Valley Power Stations meant that on average, the distance travelled by freight trains was between 7-13% less than the older route via Applehurst Junction and the ECML. Also, each train had its journey time shortened by 30 minutes, which resulted in less carbon emissions. Additionally, in the decade leading up to the planning application, the number of passengers travelling between Doncaster and York on the ECML increased by 35% so the re-routing of freight trains allowed for greater capacity on the ECML.

In addition to the new railway, the project also undertook improvements on the road network in the immediate area, providing a new overbridge for Joan Croft Lane, an unclassified road that connects the A19 with Thorpe in Balne, replacing the former Joan Croft Level crossing, 330 feet (100 m) north of the flyover's viaduct. The closure of the level crossing allowed the height of the overhead line equipment to be lowered by 4 feet 3 inches (1.3 m) (it being at a greater height due to road traffic passing beneath it), which in turn allowed the Shaftholme Viaduct to be constructed at a lower height of 4 feet 3 inches (1.3 m) and the approaching railway embankments could also be lower and less visually intrusive. The new railway chord opened to regular freight traffic on 1 June 2014, but its official opening was on 26 June 2014, by Patrick McLoughlin, the then Minister for Transport. The new chord runs from Thorpe Marsh Junction on the Skellow Line, to Haywood Junction on the Askern branch line, and has a Network Rail engineer's line reference of HTM.

With the closure of the coal-fired power stations in the Aire Valley, the traffic flows along the new chord dropped by 25%, although biomass loadings to Drax remained healthy. As Doncaster is a known "pinch-point" on the ECML, one of the possibilities for additional use of the chord is for trains that leave the east side of Doncaster railway station going north, could run via Barnby Dun, onto the Skellow Line and over the North Doncaster Chord to access the Askern branch line. In this way, the trains will not need to take up a valuable path on the twin track ECML north of Doncaster.

== See also ==
- Hitchin Flyover
- Werrington Dive Under
