= Knottingley TMD =

Disused railway traction shed in West Yorkshire, England

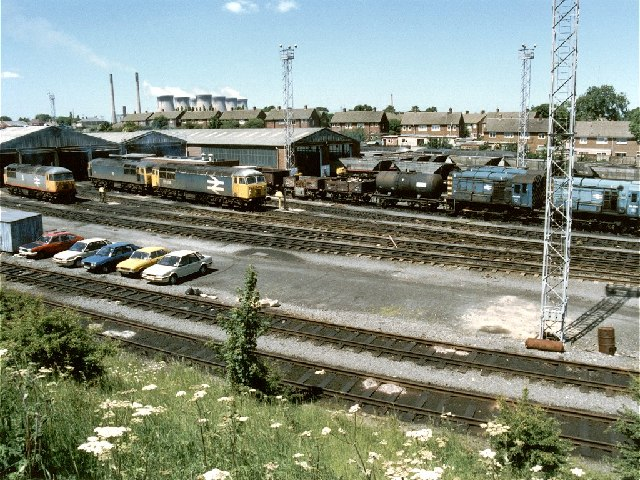
- Knottingley TMD in 1988
- Interactive map of Knottingley TMD

Location
- Location: Knottingley, West Yorkshire
- Coordinates: 53.7061°N 1.2539°W
- OS grid: SE493235

Characteristics
- Owner: DB
- Depot code: KY 1973
- Type: Diesel

History
- Opened: July 1967
- Former depot code: 56A

Knottingley TMD is a traction maintenance depot located in Knottingley, West Yorkshire, England. The depot is situated on the Pontefract Line and is near Knottingley station. It opened in 1967 to maintain the locomotives and hopper wagons for a planned 75 Merry-go-round trains a day, expected to use the Wakefield and Goole line.

== History ==
In 1976, Class 03, 04, 08 shunters and Class 47 locomotives could be seen at the depot. During the late 1970s, 1980s and 1990s the depot was home to Class 56 and from the mid eighties, Class 58 locomotives.

When the depot opened in July 1967, it was given the depot code of 56A, which had previously been a code used in Wakefield for a shed that had closed in June 1967. Later that year, it was renumbered to 55G, however since 1973 when the TOPS system was introduced, the depot code has been KY. At the time that the TOPS system was being rolled out, Knottingley was using a separate computer system called Airepower which allocated the 13 locomotives and 45 traincrew needed to run all the coal trains every week.

== Allocation ==
In 1980, the depot received Class 56s, which were to become a staple locomotive on coal traffic in the area until the Class 66 locomotives appeared in 1998. In 2016, the depot's allocation consisted of DB Cargo UK Class 60 and 66 locomotives.

== Later years ==
Of the three power stations the depot was built to serve, Ferrybridge was closed on 31 March 2016, while Eggborough was officially decommissioned in February 2018. However, the depot remained busy with gypsum and biomass traffic, particularly for the remaining Power Station at Drax, with workings from the Humber ports at Hull and Immingham.

In early 2021, the office complex at the depot, which was built in the 1990s, was demolished. The sidings were being used at the same time by Riviera Trains to refit Mark 1 and Mark 2 railway coaches.
