= Askern branch line =

Railway line in Yorkshire, England

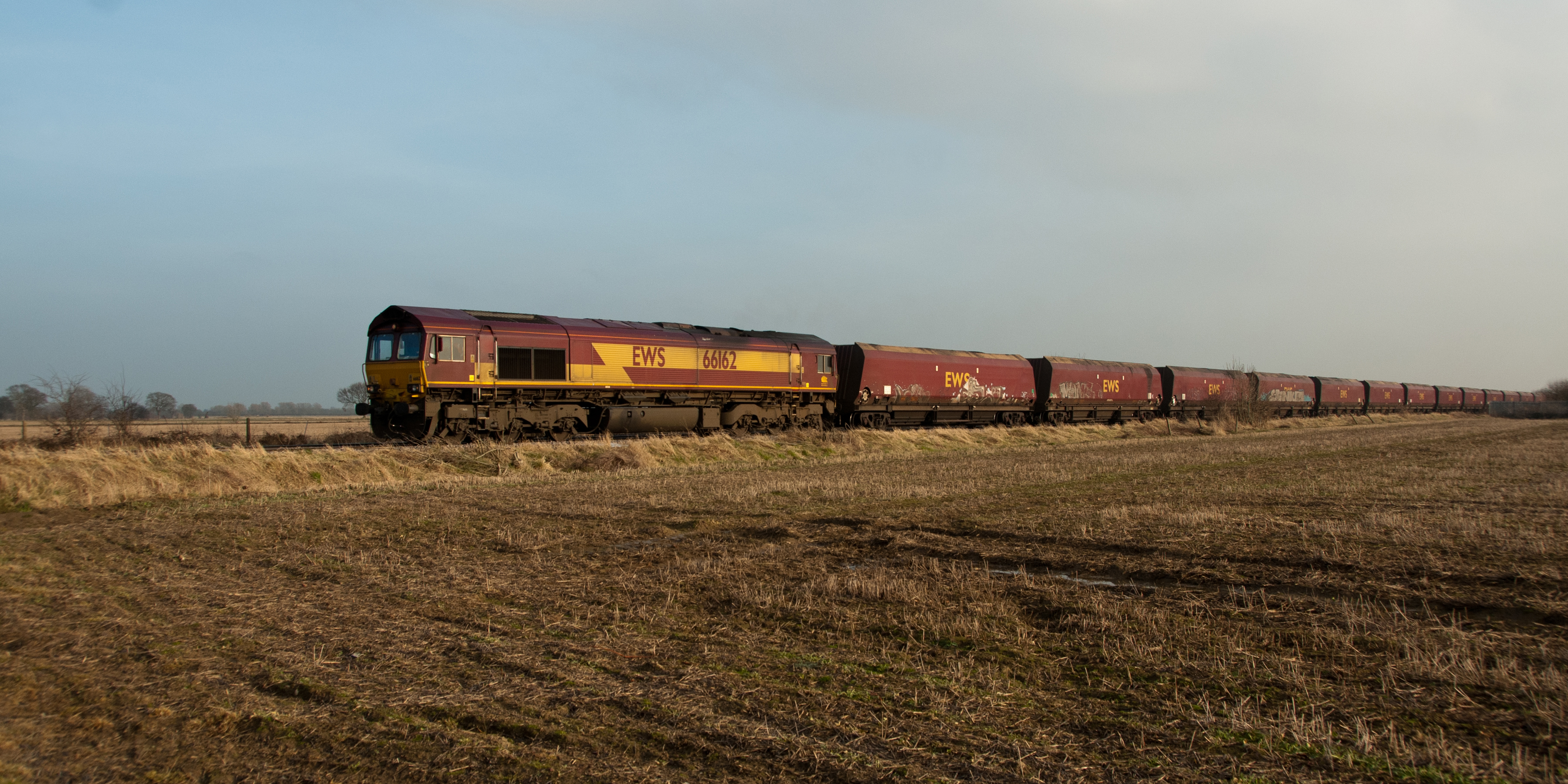
- A Class 66 diesel locomotive passing Walden Stubbs hauling a coal train

Overview
- Owner: Network Rail
- Locale: South Yorkshire, North Yorkshire, West Yorkshire
- Termini: Shaftholme; Knottingley
- Stations: 3

Service
- Operator(s): Freightliner, DB Cargo UK, GB Railfreight, Grand Central, London North Eastern Railway
- Rolling stock: Class 66, Class 180

History
- Opened: 1848-present

Technical
- Track gauge: 4 ft 8 1/2 in (1,435 mm) standard gauge
- Operating speed: 20–50 mph (32–80 km/h)
Route map
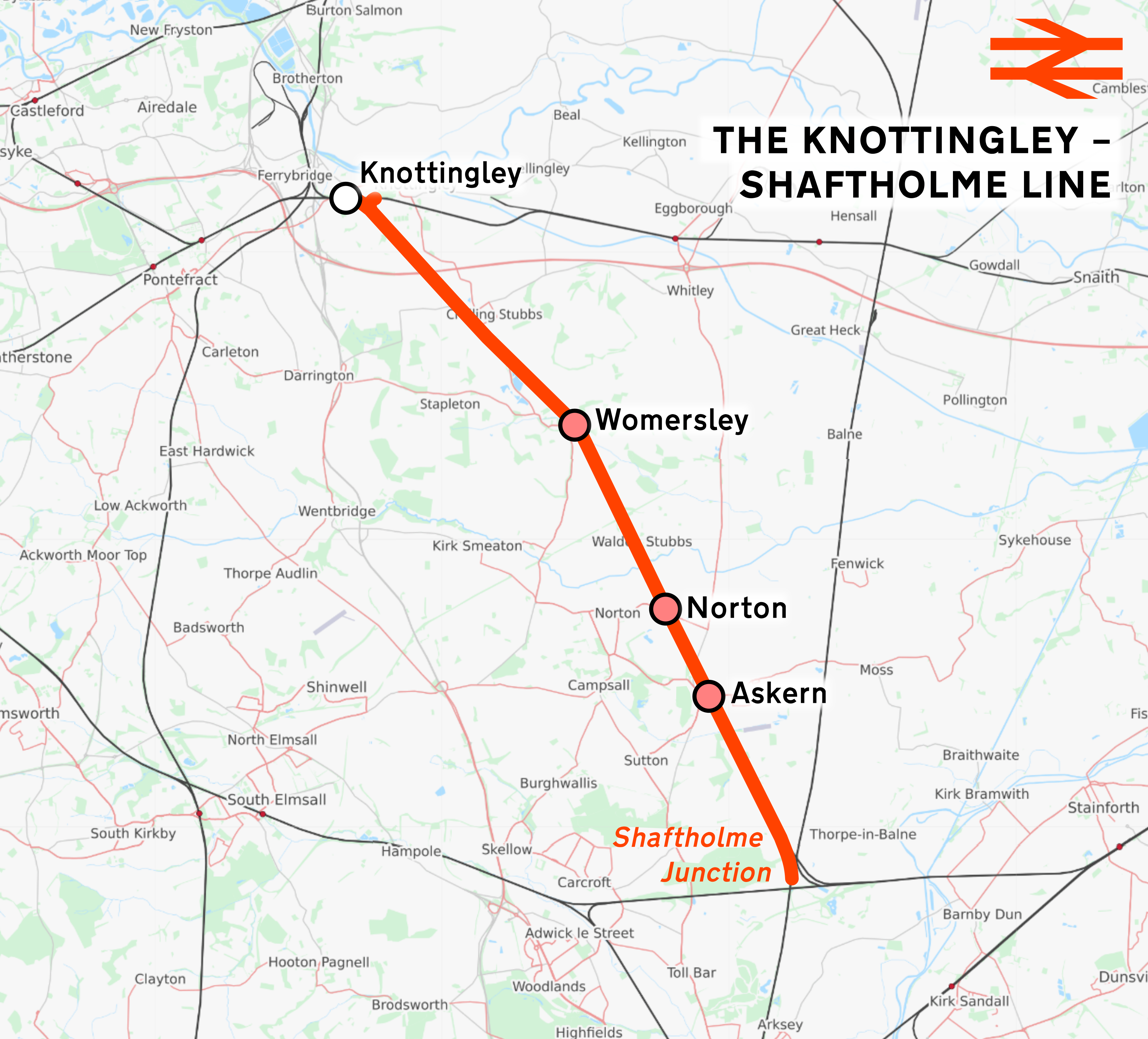
(Click to expand)

The Askern branch line is a railway line which runs through South, North and West Yorkshire in England. The stretch of track runs from Shaftholme Junction (on the East Coast Main Line between Doncaster and York), via Norton, to Knottingley, where it joins the Pontefract Line.

== History ==
The line was opened by the Lancashire & Yorkshire Railway on 6 June 1848 and running powers were granted to the Great Northern Railway. This provided an end-on junction at Askern, giving the latter company its initial access to Leeds, using part of the current Pontefract Line, and the former to Doncaster. The line subsequently became part of the newly established East Coast Main Line (ECML), with the opening of a branch from Knottingley to Burton Salmon in 1850; this gave access to the York & North Midland Railway's line from Normanton to York.

The opening of a direct line from Shaftholme Junction to York, via Selby, in January 1871 saw the end of regular express trains using the route. However, it remained busy with goods traffic, mainly coal from various collieries along its length, and continued to carry a local stopping service from Wakefield to Doncaster until closure to passengers on 27 September 1948.

=== Incidents ===
- Askern level crossing: on 3 December 1849, a rear collision with a vehicle resulted in a derailment. Four people were injured.
- Haywood level crossing: this is a CCTV level crossing, controlled by Norton signal box. On 26 February 2009, an HGV lorry smashed into the barriers, causing delays to freight services.
- Norton level crossing: this is right next to Norton signal box, which controls most of the level crossings on the Askern branch line. On 21 June 2012, a Land Rover smashed through the barriers, after fleeing from a burglary, and into two waiting cars at the other side of the crossing. This resulting in a full road closure, major delays to the freight services and to the London-Bradford passenger service. Four barriers had to be replaced by Network Rail.

== The line today ==
The line remained open, both to freight traffic and passenger trains diverted when either the ECML or the Doncaster–Leeds line is closed for engineering work.

After a more than 70-year hiatus, regular scheduled passenger services recommenced by open-access operator Grand Central from the May 2010 timetable change; the first services ran as planned on 23 May 2010.

These trains run between London King's Cross and Bradford Interchange, via Doncaster, Knottingley, Pontefract Monkhill, Wakefield Kirkgate, Mirfield, Brighouse and Halifax. The necessary track access rights, for an initial three trains per day each way, were awarded to Grand Central by the Office of Rail Regulation (ORR) in January 2009.

For the December 2011 timetable change, the company announced that it wished to remove the stops at Pontefract and divert its remaining services via Adwick to significantly reduce journey times; permission for this from the ORR was not forthcoming. In December 2013, Grand Central services started to serve Mirfield and a fourth return service commenced via this route.

Infrastructure operator Network Rail carried out upgrade works at the southern end of the line between 2012 and 2014. A new flyover was constructed that permits freight services from the ex-West Riding and Grimsby Railway route, between Hatfield and Stainforth and Adwick, to bridge the ECML and join the line just north of Askern Junction. This allows coal trains from the deep water import terminal at Port of Immingham to run directly to the Aire valley power stations, without needing to join the ECML at Joan Croft Junction and use a 15-mile (24 km) section from there towards York; this freed up capacity on a busy section of the route. The new flyover, known as North Doncaster Chord, was opened in June 2014.
