= East Coast Main Line =

Principal railway route in Great Britain

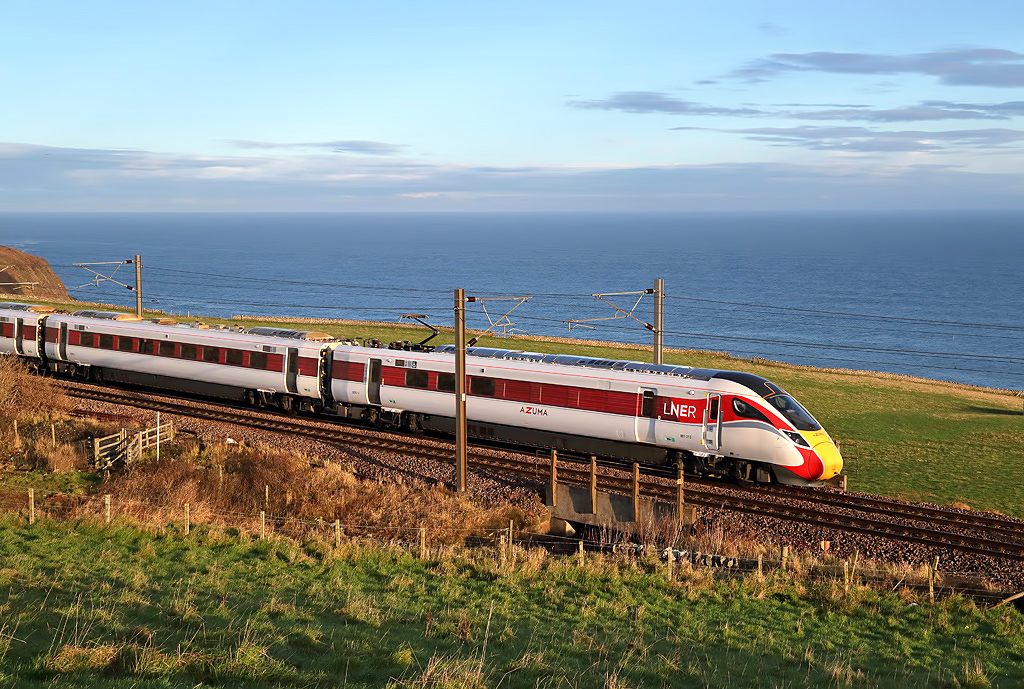
- An LNER Class 800 Azuma at Burnmouth

Overview
- Status: Operational
- Owner: Network Rail
- Locale: Greater London; East of England; East Midlands; Yorkshire and the Humber; North East England; Scottish Borders; Central Scotland
- Termini: London King's Cross (Note: 51.5314°N 0.1234°W); Edinburgh Waverley (Note: 55.9522°N 3.1889°W)
- Stations: 52

Service
- Type: Commuter rail; Inter-city rail; Heavy rail
- System: National Rail
- Operators: London North Eastern Railway; Greater Thameslink Railway; Hull Trains; East Midlands Railway; CrossCountry; TransPennine Express; Northern Trains; ScotRail; Grand Central; Lumo; DB Cargo UK; GB Railfreight; Freightliner; Direct Rail Services; Colas Rail
- Depots: Bounds Green (London); Craigentinny (Edinburgh); Doncaster Carr; Haymarket (Edinburgh); Heaton (Newcastle-upon-Tyne); Hornsey (London); Neville Hill (Leeds)

History
- Opened: 1850; 176 years ago

Technical
- Line length: 393 mi 13 chains (632.7 km)
- Num of tracks: Double and quadruple track (Note: The section of line between Finsbury Park and Alexandra Palace is sextuple-tracked.[Error: unknown version "June 2026" "London North Eastern Sectional Appendix"]. National Electronic Sectional Appendix. Network Rail.)
- Character: Primary
- Track gauge: 1,435 mm (4 ft 8 1/2 in) standard gauge
- Loading gauge: W9 (via Hertford Loop)
- Route availability: RA 7–9, RA 10 in parts between Selby and York
- Electrification: 25 kV 50 Hz AC OLE
- Operating speed: 125 mph (200 km/h) (Note: With plans to increase to 140 mph (225 km/h).)
Route map
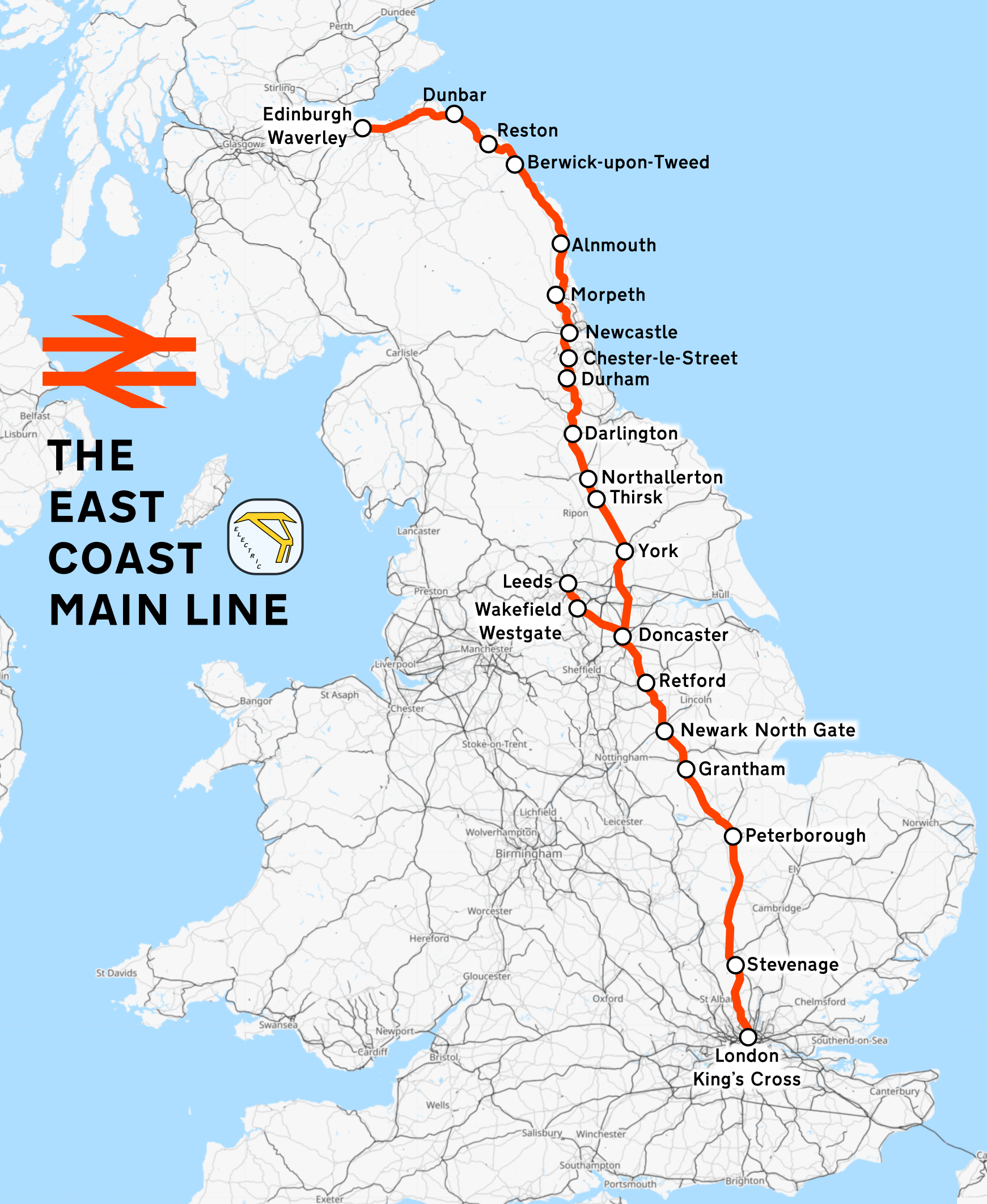
(Click to expand)

The East Coast Main Line (ECML) is a 393-mile-long (632 km) electrified railway between London King's Cross and Edinburgh Waverley, via Peterborough, Doncaster, York, Darlington, Durham and Newcastle. It is a key transport artery on the eastern side of Great Britain running broadly parallel to the A1 road. The main line acts as a "spine" for several diverging branches, serving destinations such as Cambridge, Lincoln, Leeds, Hull and Sunderland, all with direct services to London. In addition, a few ECML services extend beyond Edinburgh to serve other Scottish destinations, such as Stirling, Inverness, Dundee and Aberdeen.

The line was built during the 1840s by three railway companies: the North British Railway, the North Eastern Railway and the Great Northern Railway. In 1923, the Railways Act 1921 led to their amalgamation to form the London and North Eastern Railway (LNER) and the line became its primary route. The LNER competed with the London, Midland and Scottish Railway (LMS) for long-distance passenger traffic between London and Scotland. The LNER's chief mechanical engineer, Nigel Gresley, designed iconic Pacific steam locomotives including Flying Scotsman and Mallard, the latter of which achieved a world record speed for a steam locomotive, 126 mph (203 km/h) on the Grantham-to-Peterborough section on 3 July 1938.

In 1948, the railways were nationalised and operated by British Railways. In the early 1960s, steam was replaced by diesel-electric traction, including the Deltics, and sections of the line were upgraded so that trains could run at speeds of up to 100 mph (160 km/h). With the demand for higher speed, British Rail introduced InterCity 125 high-speed trains between 1976 and 1981. In 1973, a Class 41 (an HST prototype) achieved a top speed of 143 mph (230 km/h) in a test run. In the 1980s, the line was electrified and InterCity 225 trains introduced. These have in turn been largely replaced by Class 800 and Class 801 units. The November 2021 Integrated Rail Plan for the North and Midlands stated that the linespeed would be upgraded to 140 mph (225 km/h).

The line links London, South East England, East Anglia and the East Midlands, with Yorkshire, the North East and Scotland, and is important to their local economies. It carries commuter traffic in north London as well as cross-country, commuter and local passenger services, and freight. In 1997, operations were privatised. The primary long-distance operator is London North Eastern Railway, but open-access competition on services to Northern England and Scotland is provided by Hull Trains, Grand Central and Lumo.

== Route definition and description ==
The ECML is part of Network Rail's Strategic Route G, which comprises five separate lines:

- The main line between London King's Cross and Edinburgh Waverley, via Stevenage, Peterborough, Grantham, Newark North Gate, Retford, Doncaster, York, Northallerton, Darlington, Durham, Newcastle, Morpeth, Alnmouth, Berwick-upon-Tweed and Dunbar. The line crosses the Anglo-Scottish border at Marshall Meadows Bay;
- The Wakefield Line, between Doncaster and Leeds, via Wakefield Westgate;
- The Northern City Line from Finsbury Park to Moorgate;
- The Hertford Loop Line from Alexandra Palace to Stevenage;
- The branch line to North Berwick.

The core route is the main line between King's Cross and Edinburgh, the Hertford Loop is used for local and freight services, and the Northern City Line provides an inner-suburban service to the city. The line has engineers line references (ELR) ECM1 to ECM9.

== History ==
=== Origins and early operations ===
The ECML was constructed by three independent railway companies. During the 1830s and 1840s, each company built part of the route to serve its own area, but also intending to link with other railways to form the through route that would become the East Coast Main Line. From north to south, the companies were the:

- North British Railway (NBR) from Edinburgh to Berwick-upon-Tweed, completed in 1846
- North Eastern Railway (NER) from Berwick-upon-Tweed to Shaftholme, just north of Doncaster
- Great Northern Railway (GNR) from Shaftholme to King's Cross, completed in 1850.

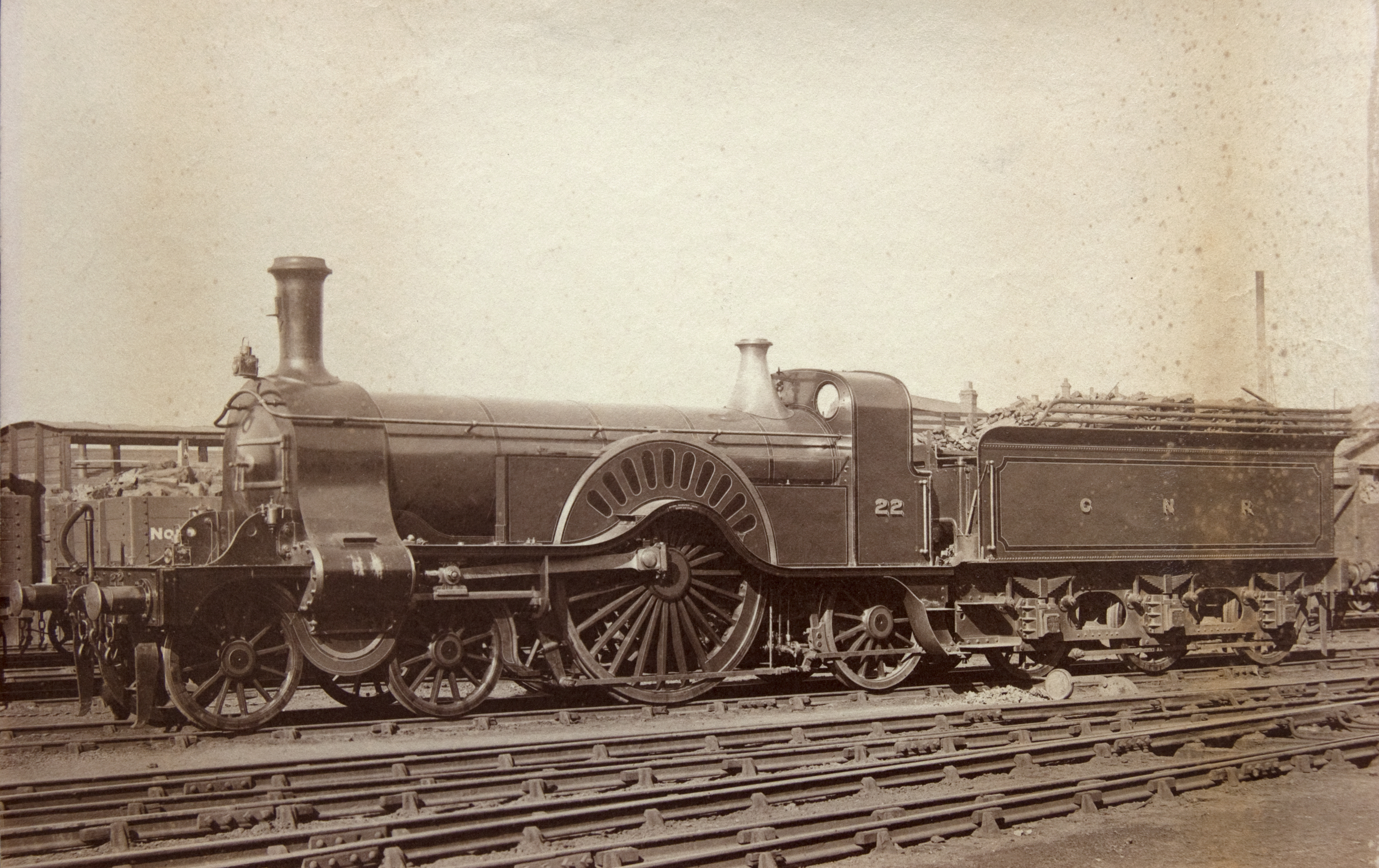
A GNR Stirling Single express locomotive of the late 19th century

The GNR established an end-on connection with the NER at Askern, famously described by the GNR's chairman as in "a ploughed field four miles north of Doncaster." Askern was connected to the Lancashire and Yorkshire Railway, a short section of which was used to reach the NER at Knottingley. In 1871, the line was shortened when the NER opened a direct line from an end-on junction, with the GNR, at Shaftholme, just south of Askern to Selby and over Selby Bridge on the Leeds-Hull line direct to York.

Through journeys were important and lucrative for the companies and in 1860 they built special rolling stock for the line. Services were operated using "East Coast Joint Stock" until 1922. The trains were hauled by GNR locomotives between King's Cross and York, which entailed utilisation of GNR running powers over the NER between Shaftholme Junction and York (which had been agreed in 1849 and exercised from the opening of the GNR in 1850); and by NER locomotives between York and Edinburgh, using NER running powers over the NBR between Berwick and Edinburgh (agreed in 1862 but not exercised until 1869).

=== LNER era ===
The entire ECML came under control of the London and North Eastern Railway (LNER) in 1923, under the Railways Act 1921 which grouped many small railway companies into four large ones. The LNER was the second largest railway company in Britain, its routes were located to the north and east of London.

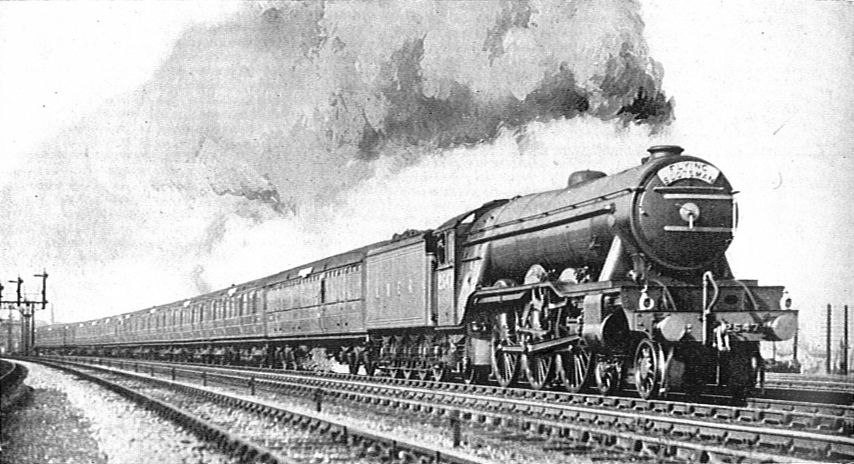
LNER Class A1 No. 2547 Doncaster hauls the daily Flying Scotsman in 1928.

The LNER appointed Nigel Gresley, who was knighted in 1937, as its Chief Mechanical Engineer. Under his tenure, Pacific steam locomotives were developed as the standard express locomotive to work the line, several of which became famous; these included the Class A3, including 4472 Flying Scotsman, and the later Class A4, including 4468 Mallard. During this time Mallard set a new world-record speed for a steam locomotive (see § Speed records).

=== Races to the North ===
The East Coast Main Line was engaged in long running rivalry with the West Coast Main Line (WCML), the other main trunk route between London and Scotland. At various points in the late 19th century, highly publicised but unofficial races occurred between express trains on the two routes, most notably in 1888 and 1895. These races were ended over concerns over safety, but later the rivalry resumed in the 1920s and 1930s as both the LNER and its West Coast competitor, the London, Midland and Scottish Railway (LMS), produced ever-more-powerful express locomotives. This reached its crescendo in the late 1930s, when the LNER introduced the famous streamlined Class A4 locomotives and the LMS countered with its own streamlined Coronation Class – both of which were capable of reaching speeds in excess of 100 mph (160 km/h). The competition was curtailed soon thereafter by the coming of World War II.

=== British Rail era ===
In the aftermath of the war, Clement Attlee's Labour Government nationalised the LNER and the other three major railway companies in Great Britain with the passage of the Transport Act 1947. With effect from 1 January 1948, they were merged into British Railways (BR). The ECML came under the control of three of BR's regions: the Eastern Region, the North Eastern Region and the Scottish Region (the former two were merged in 1967).

==== Diesel era ====
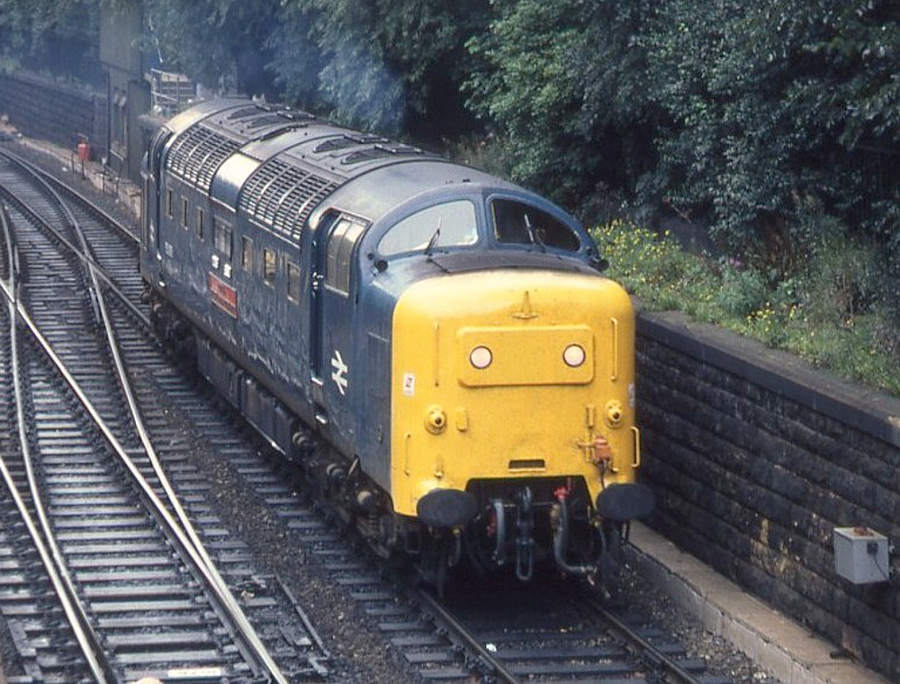
A Class 55 Deltic locomotive at Edinburgh in 1980; these were the main express locomotives on the ECML in the 1960s and 1970s

In the early 1960s, steam locomotives were replaced by diesel-electrics, amongst them the Deltic, a powerful high-speed locomotive developed and built by English Electric. The prototype was successful and a fleet of 22 locomotives were built and put into BR service for express traffic. Designated Class 55, they were powered by a pair of Napier Deltic engines that had been developed for fast torpedo boats. The Class 55 Deltics were, for a time, the fastest and most powerful diesel locomotives in service in Britain, capable of reaching 100 mph (160 km/h) and providing up to 3,300 hp (2,500 kW). When introduced into service in 1961, the Class 55's ability to rapidly accelerate and maintain high speed with a heavy train over long distances immediately cut over one hour from the standard London to Edinburgh journey time, from seven hours to under six. Further improvements to the infrastructure meant that, by the mid-1970s, another half-hour had been cut from the journey time.

In the years following the introduction of the Deltics, sections of the ECML were upgraded for trains running at speeds of up to 100 mph (160 km/h). On 15 June 1965, the first length of high-speed line, a 17 miles (27 km) stretch between Peterborough and Grantham, was completed. The next section was 12 miles (19 km) of line between Grantham and Newark and more sections were upgraded to enable high speeds along much of the line.

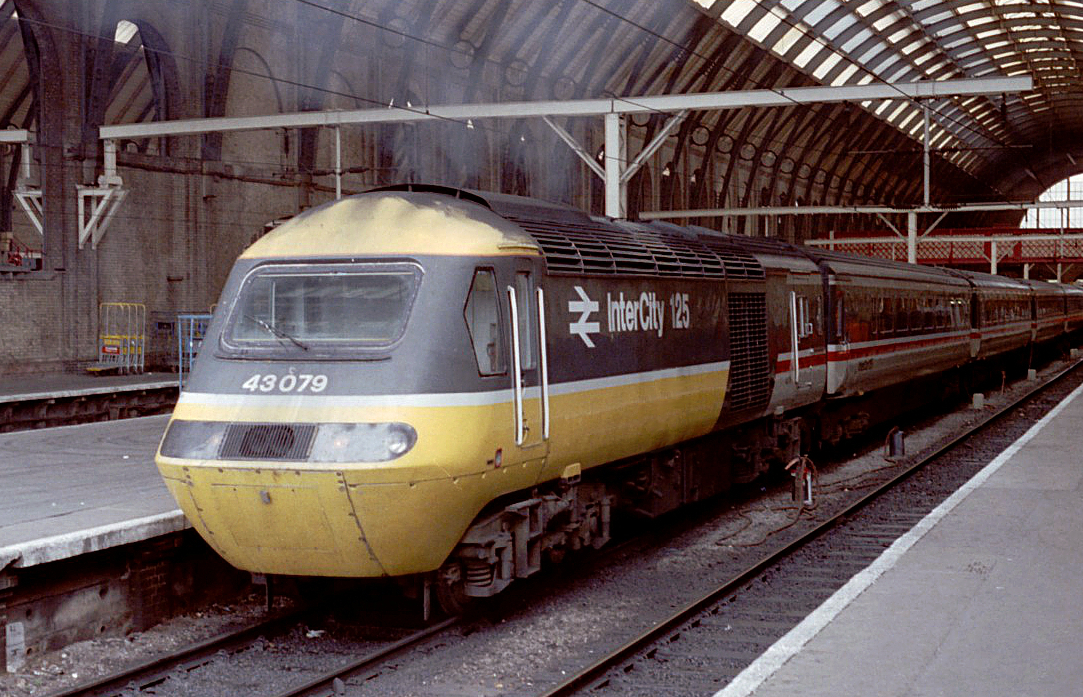
An InterCity 125 at King's Cross in 1988

Continuing demand for reduced journey times led British Rail to introduce a successor to the Deltics, the InterCity 125 High Speed Train (HST) between 1978 and 1979. These could reach speeds up to 125 mph (201 km/h) on existing infrastructure, bringing the fastest London–Edinburgh timing down by another hour, to 4 1/2 hours. They operated most express passenger services on the line until electrification was completed in 1991, after which they continued in use on services that run off the ECML and onto non-electrified lines. Generally popular with the public and considered by some to be iconic, they ran on the ECML for 41 years before being withdrawn in 2019.

In 1973, the prototype HST Class 41 recorded a top speed of 143 mph (230 km/h) in a test run on the line.

==== Electrification ====
There had been proposals to electrify all or parts of the ECML as far back as the early 1900s; no significant scheme was implemented until the 1970s and 1980s, with the entire line being electrified in two stages between 1976 and 1991.

Early proposed schemes included a 1904 proposal by the Great Northern Railway to electrify its suburban services from London. A short stretch of the ECML in the Newcastle area was electrified with a third rail in 1904, as part of the North Eastern Railway's suburban Tyneside Electrics scheme. Following the success of this scheme, in 1919 the North Eastern Railway, planned to electrify 80 miles (130 km) of the main line between York and Newcastle; the scheme progressed as far as a prototype locomotive; however, it was cancelled on financial grounds after 1923, when the NER was grouped into the LNER and the new management had no interest in pursuing the scheme. In the early-1930s, studies were conducted into electrifying sections or all of the ECML.

British Rail's 1955 modernisation plan placed equal importance on electrification of both the West Coast Main Line (WCML) and ECML; a detailed plan drawn up in 1957 gave a completion date of 1970 for ECML electrification. However, the East Coast authorities decided that they could not wait over a decade for service improvements, and instead decided to invest in high-speed diesel traction, the Deltic and High Speed Train, as an interim measure to implement improved services, whilst West Coast electrification proceeded, and was largely complete by 1974. During the period when Richard Beeching was chairman of British Rail, WCML electrification including the spur from Carstairs to Edinburgh was seen as possible justification for the truncation of the ECML at Newcastle.

British Rail carried out electrification of the southern part of the ECML with 25 kV AC overhead lines from London King's Cross to Hitchin between 1976 and 1977. This was authorised in 1971 for the benefit of London suburban services as part of the Great Northern Suburban Electrification Project, using Mk. 3A equipment. The scheme electrified 70 route miles (110 km), including the Hertford Loop Line, part of the Cambridge Line from Hitchin to Royston, and incorporated the Northern City Line to Moorgate.

In the late 1970s, a working group of British Rail and Department for Transport officials convened and determined that, of all options for further electrification, the ECML represented the best value by far. Its in-house forecasts determined that increases in revenue and considerable reductions in energy and maintenance costs would occur by electrifying the line. In 1984, the decision was made to commence the electrification of the rest of the ECML to Edinburgh and Leeds. The Secretary of State for Transport Nicholas Ridley and Minister for Railways David Mitchell played a large role in the decision to proceed.

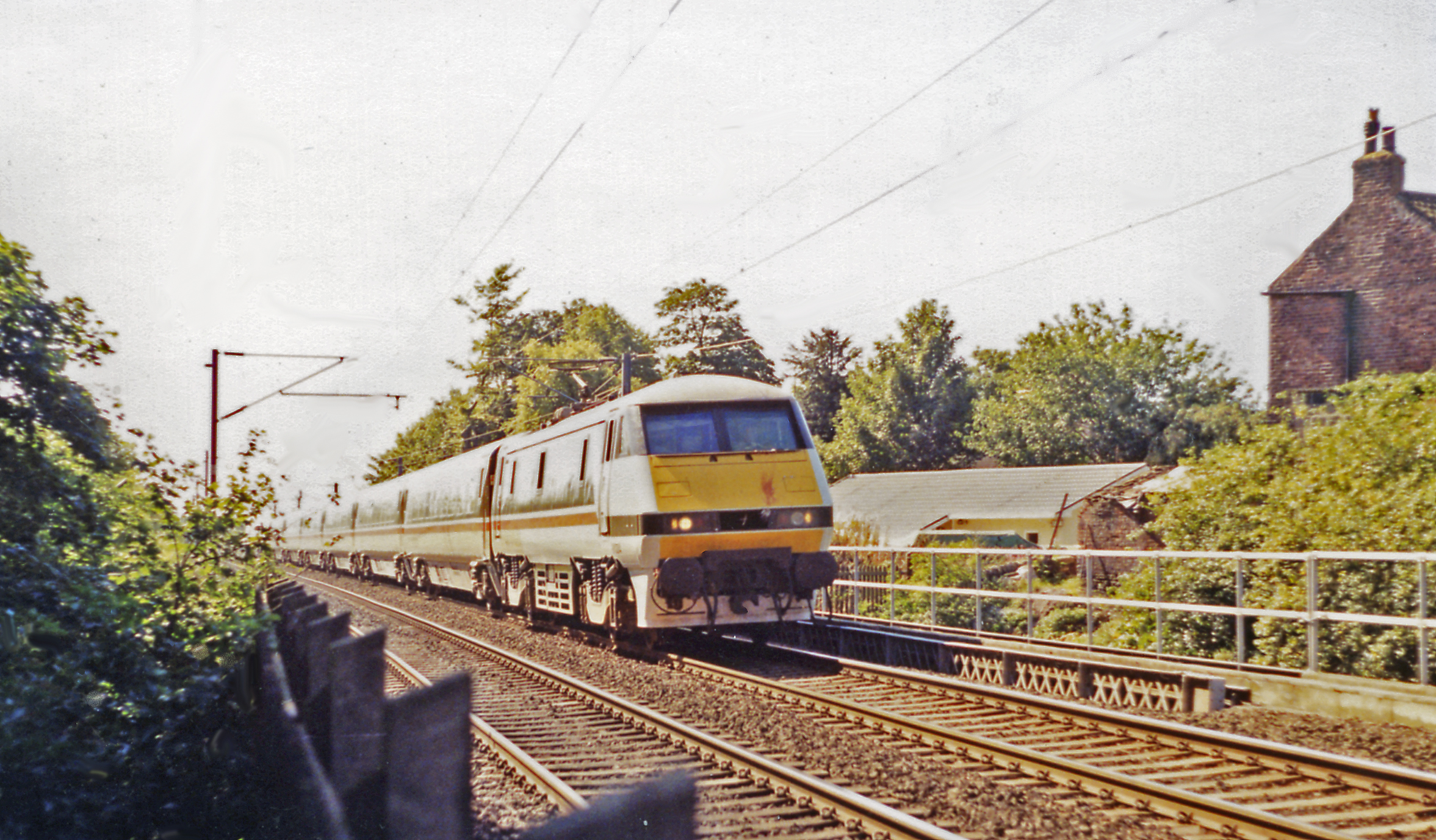
An InterCity 225 set on the ECML in 1991, shortly after the completion of the electrification

Construction began on the second phase in 1985. In 1986, the section to Huntingdon was completed; Leeds was reached in 1988, then York in 1989 and Edinburgh in 1991. Electric services on the full length of the line began on 8 July 1991, eight weeks later than scheduled. Significant traffic increases occurred in the two years after completion; one station recorded a 58 per cent increase in passengers. The programme also electrified the Edinburgh-Carstairs branch of the WCML, to allow InterCity 225 sets to access Glasgow, with the added benefit of creating an electrified path to/from Edinburgh on the WCML from the south.

In total the electrification programme covered roughly 1,400 single-track miles (2,300 km) and required major infrastructure changes, including resignalling of the line from Temple Hirst Junction (near Selby in Yorkshire) to the Scottish border; the construction of new signalling centres at Niddrie, York, and Newcastle; the commissioning of ten new connections to the national electricity grid; and structure clearance and electrical immunisation works along the length of the line. Included in the structure clearance works were the 127 overbridges that crossed the ECML. Where the existing bridge clearance was insufficient, project managers favoured wherever possible the rebuilding of the bridge rather than the lowering of the track, as the latter requires considerable civil works and can create long-term drainage problems.

Royal Border Bridge near Berwick, showing low-profile electrification equipment positioned to match the spacing of the bridge's arches.

Where listed buildings were to be affected by the programme, BR sought approval for its plans from the Royal Fine Art Commission. Through this process a special design of overhead wiring was developed for use on the visually-sensitive Royal Border Bridge, as well as the Croxdale and Durham City viaducts. Elsewhere the standard Mk. 3B equipment was deployed.

The electrification was completed at a cost of £344.4 million (at 1983 prices, equivalent to £1219.7 million in 2024), a minor overrun against its authorised expenditure of £331.9 million. Of the total cost, 60 per cent was for the electrification process itself, while the remaining 40 per cent covered rolling stock, including the new InterCity 225 trains procured specially for the route. These were introduced in 1989 to operate express services. They were developed by the General Electric Company (GEC), as the winners of a competitive tender process. The InterCity 225 sets were used alongside other rolling stock, including Class 90 locomotives and Class 317 electric multiple units. The displaced diesel trains were reallocated predominantly to the Midland Main Line.

The infrastructure supported speeds of up to 140 mph, allowing a non-stop run of three hours and 29 minutes between London and Edinburgh on 26 September 1991. As part of testing done to support safe operation at the increased maximum speed, BR experimented in 1988 with using a fifth signalling aspect – flashing green – on the fast lines between Peterborough and Stoke Tunnel. The flashing green aspect appeared at signals preceding one displaying an ordinary steady green aspect, and authorised running at up to 140 mph. Upon encountering a steady green aspect the driver would reduce speed to no greater than 125 mph, and thus be ready to react to subsequent signals in the same manner as when driving a lower-speed train. The testing found, however, that drivers couldn't be expected to consistently and accurately interpret and respond to lineside signals when driving at the higher speed; regulations were later changed throughout Britain to require the use of in-cab signalling whenever running service trains at speeds above 125 mph. Nevertheless, the fifth aspect was not removed from signals in the test area, and the relevant track Sectional Appendix continued to list the capability to run special test trains in excess of 125 mph as recently as 2008.

=== Privatisation and renationalisation ===
As part of the privatisation of British Rail in the mid-1990s, passenger operations on the ECML were offered to bidders as the InterCity East Coast franchise, and it was awarded to Great North Eastern Railway (GNER) in 1996. The advent of privatisation exacarbated the long-standing rivalvry between the East Coast Main Line and West Coast Main Line (WCML). Upon its creation, GNER had the benefit of the ECML upgrade programme having recently been completed, and the then-new InterCity 225 fleet, whereas the WCML was badly in need of upgrades, and such a programme had been cancelled by the government as it would have interfered with the privatisation process. However, since privatisation, that position has reversed, with the West Coast Main Line route modernisation and introduction of the British Rail Class 390 Pendolino giving the WCML the advantage until the Intercity Express Programme.

The franchise was held by GNER until 2007, when the company experienced financial difficulties; the franchise then passed to National Express East Coast until in 2009, when it too encountered financial problems and the government was forced to run the franchise itself as East Coast. Another attempt at returning the franchise to private-sector operation was made by Virgin Trains East Coast in 2015, but this failed in 2018; thus, since then, it has been run by the public sector through the government's operator of last resort procedure under the London North Eastern Railway brand.

=== Route alterations ===
The route of the ECML has been altered or diverted several times, beginning with the opening of the King Edward VII Bridge in Newcastle upon Tyne in 1906. Later, the Penmanshiel tunnel collapse in the Scottish Borders in 1979 necessitated urgent works to divert the line around the irreparably-damaged tunnel; ultimately the line was closed for five months and around 1,100 yards (1 km) of the original alignment had to be abandoned.

In the late 1970s in the north of England, the development of the Selby Coalfield – and the anticipated subsidence that might result from its workings – led the National Coal Board to pay for the construction of the 14-mile-long (23 km) Selby Diversion. Construction commenced in 1980, and was completed in late 1983 at a cost of £63 million (equivalent to £223 million in 2024). The new section diverged from the original alignment at Temple Hirst Junction, north of Doncaster, bypassed Selby station and the area to be undermined by coal workings, and then joined the Leeds–York line of the former York and North Midland Railway at Colton Junction, south-west of York. The old line between Selby and York was dismantled and is now a public cycleway.

Mining subsidence discovered in 2001 also necessitated the realignment of 1.8 km (1.1 mi) of line at Dolphingstone in East Lothian, between Prestonpans and Wallyford stations. The new alignment takes the form of a gentle curve of up to 77 m (253 ft) towards the south, supported by concrete slabs and other ground stabilisation and reinforcement techniques, and is designed to avoid the need for a permanent speed restriction. It came into use in the last week of April 2003, at a cost of £56 million (equivalent to £96 million in 2024).

=== Speed records ===
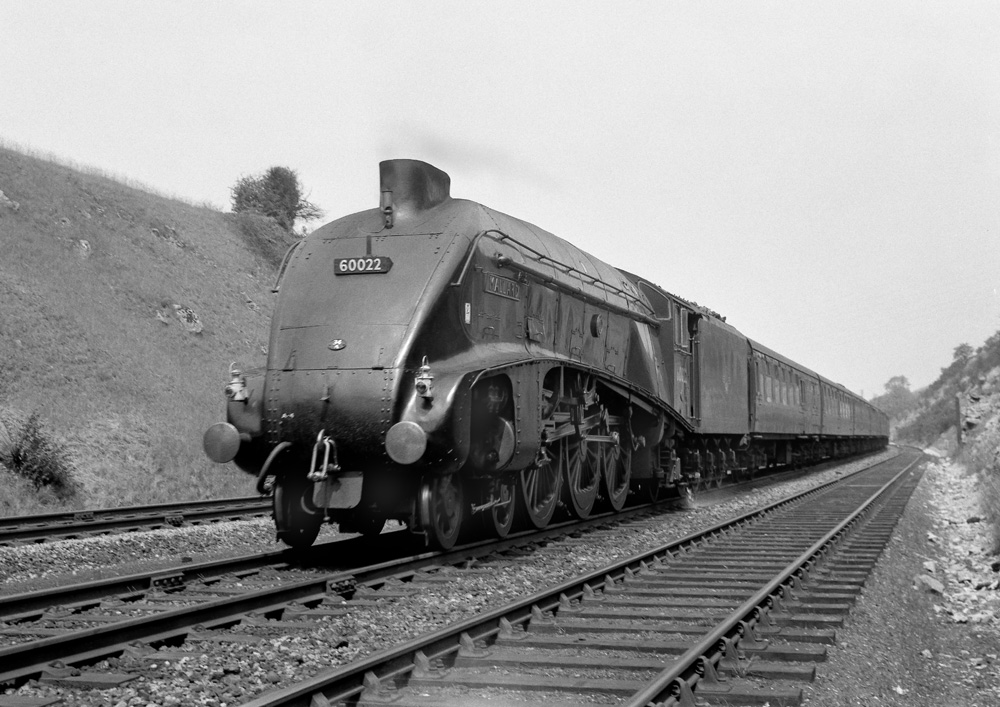
Mallard, the world record-holding steam locomotive

World speed records for both steam and diesel traction have been set on the ECML.

LNER's Mallard set the record for a steam locomotive at 126 mph (203 km/h) whilst descending Stoke Bank on 3 July 1938. The record remains standing today, and a trackside sign was erected in July 1998 at the 90 1/4 milepost to commemorate the achievement.

The world record for diesel-powered trains was set at 148 mph (238 km/h) on 1 November 1987, by a shortened InterCity 125 train of two Class 43 power cars and three coaches during a southbound run from Darlington to York. At least two other trains have subsequently recorded higher speeds but, as of February 2023, the InterCity 125 record remains the highest to have been verified officially.

A British speed record for electric locomotives of 161.7 mph (260.2 km/h) was achieved on 17 September 1989, also at Stoke Bank, by Class 91 locomotive number 91010. On 26 September 1991, a shortened InterCity 225 train was authorised to reach speeds up to 140mph, completing the London to Edinburgh journey in 3 hours 29 minutes.

== Future ==
In November 2021, as part of the Integrated Rail Plan, the DfT announced a major upgrade of the line. The upgrade is set to include major track improvements and digital signalling, leading to higher speeds, reduced journey times and increases in seat capacity. The power supply will also be upgraded to allow longer and more frequent trains.

=== East Coast digital programme ===
The last refresh of the lineside signalling system on the southern ECML between London King's Cross and the Stoke Tunnel was commissioned in 1977 and as such was up for renewal between 2020 and 2029. Instead of renewing the current lineside signalling, it was decided to upgrade this section of the ECML to ERTMS in-cab signalling. This will not be the first instance of ERTMS on the UK rail network; it is in use on the Cambrian Line (where it was first piloted), on the Thameslink core Widened Lines route (with an ATO overlay), and on the Heathrow branch of the Great Western Main Line. However, it is the most complex application yet; it is the first use in the UK of ERTMS on such a busy, mixed-traffic line, with freight, commuter, regional and inter-city services sharing as few as two tracks in the tightest sections.

Unlike the Widened Lines route and the GWML, where ERTMS complements traditional lineside signals, the southern ECML will have its signals removed once the transition period to ERTMS is complete. This means that all trains running on the route will be required to be fitted with the appropriate onboard equipment.

The Class 800 series (LNER Azuma Classes 800 and 801, Hull Trains Paragon Class 802, Lumo Class 803), Thameslink Class 700 and Great Northern Class 717 fleets are fitted with ERTMS equipment from manufacture. The Great Northern Class 387 fleet is undergoing retrofit, with the first train sent to Worksop Depot in October 2022. Following its return to service in July 2023, the remaining trains will be retrofitted in Hornsey Depot. The introduction of in-cab signalling will allow the ECML line speed to be increased to 140 mph in some places. The Class 800 series trains were designed to reach this speed, but minor modifications will be required to remove the equipment that is currently limiting speeds to 125 mph. There are currently no plans to retrofit ERTMS equipment to the InterCity 225 fleet, as they are expected to be withdrawn before the removal of the lineside signals; this means they will never reach their design speed of 140 mph (225 km/h) in service.

=== Darlington railway station upgrade ===
As part of a £140 million investment, Darlington railway station is being redeveloped to increase the reliability, connectivity, and accessibility of the station; the plan resurrects many features of the abandoned Tees Valley Metro. The project includes the construction of a new concourse, multi-storey car park and two new platforms on the current freight avoiding lines. The Tees Valley Combined Authority contributed £43 million towards the upgrade, with the other £96 million being supplied by Network Rail and the Department for Transport. Other key stakeholders in the project include LNER, who manage the station, and Darlington Borough Council.

The upgrade includes the construction of a new Eastern concourse at the station, two new platforms at the station, and the remodelling of the track layout, and a new bridge over the railway on Smithfield Road. The upgrade also includes work to the overhead line equipment and installation of new points and cabling. The project was scheduled to finish in 2025 as part of the Railway 200 celebrations, which mark the anniversary of the opening of the Stockton and Darlington Railway, which began serving Darlington station in 1825. However the upgrade is now scheduled to finish in 2026.

The East Coast Main Line was closed over six weekends in early 2025 in order to facilitate this work; as part of the closure, work was also carried out on the track at Chester-Le-Street, the demolition of the Allerdene bridge over the railway near Newcastle-upon-Tyne and many other smaller projects that made use of the closure. A 50-tonne footbridge was installed during these closures in February 2025, which will connect the existing building with the two new platforms.

== Infrastructure ==
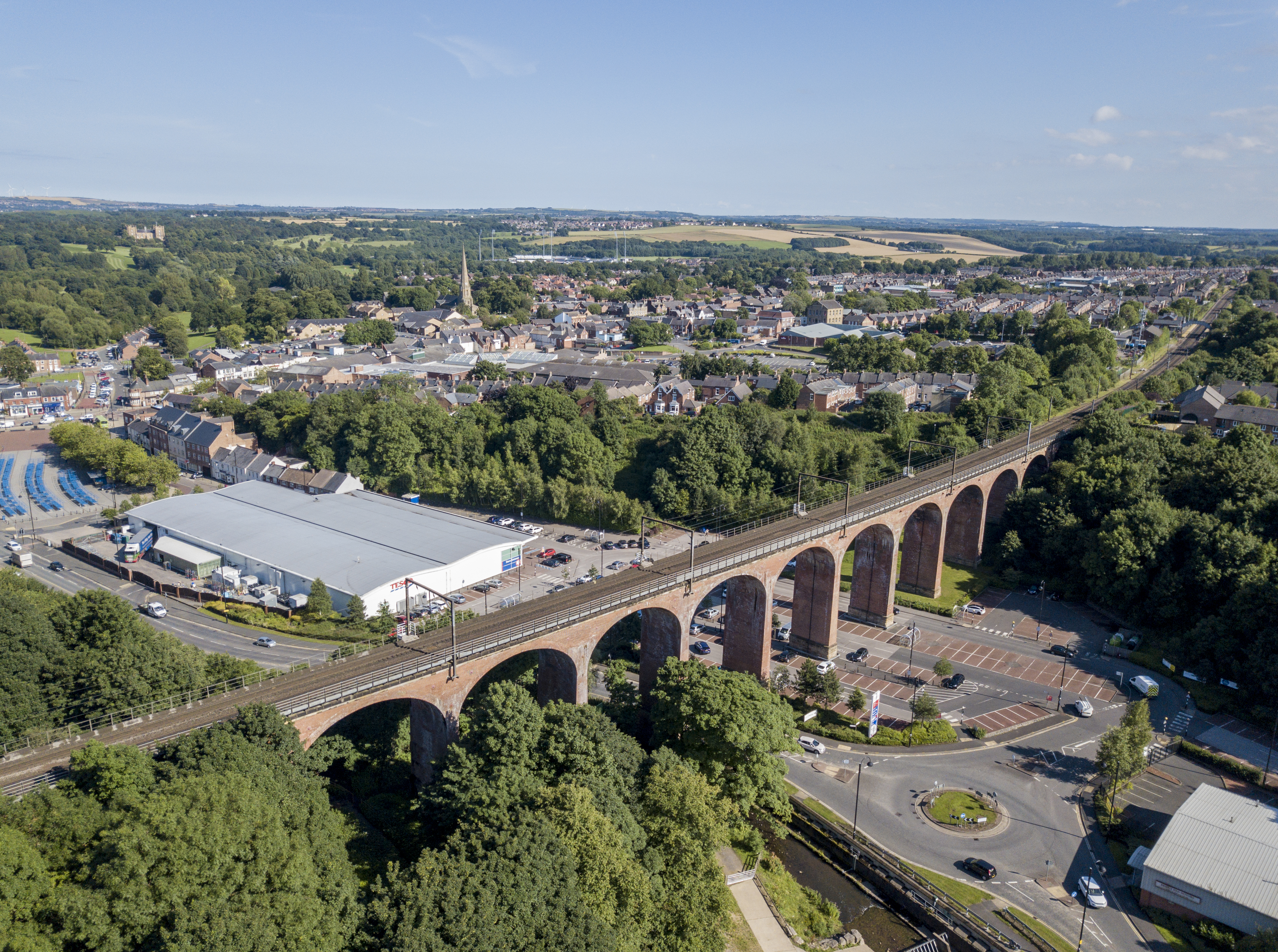
Chester Burn Viaduct carries the ECML through the County Durham town of Chester-le-Street

The line is mainly quadruple track from London to Stoke Tunnel, south of Grantham, with two double track sections: one between Digswell Jn & Woolmer Green Jn, where the line passes over the Digswell Viaduct, Welwyn North station and the two Welwyn tunnels; and one between Fletton Junction (south of Peterborough) and Holme Junction, south of Holme Fen. The route between Holme Junction and Huntingdon is mostly triple track, with the exception of a southbound loop between Conington and Woodwalton. North of Grantham the line is double track except for quadruple-track sections at Retford, around Doncaster, between Colton Junction (south of York), Thirsk and Northallerton and Newcastle.

The line is carried along its route by several bridges and viaducts which are recognised as architecturally significant listed structures; the longest of which is the 659-metre-long (2,162 ft) Royal Border Bridge at Berwick-upon-Tweed. Others include Digswell Viaduct, near Welwyn Garden City, at 475 m (1,558 ft), the Ouseburn Viaduct in Newcastle at 280 m (920 ft), Durham Viaduct at 240 m (790 ft) and Chester Burn Viaduct in Chester-le-Street at 230 m (750 ft). The 350-metre-long (1,150 ft) King Edward VII Bridge in Newcastle was opened in 1906, replacing the older High Level Bridge as the main railway crossing of the River Tyne.

Newark flat crossing, where the ECML crosses the Nottingham–Lincoln line on the same level just north of Newark Northgate station, is one of only two remaining flat crossings in Britain, the other being on the Cambrian Line where it intersects with the Welsh Highland Railway. Plans for grade separating the crossing with a flyover or tunnel, which would increase capacity on both lines, have been proposed on several occasions but have been thwarted by costs and spatial constraints at the site.

With most of the line rated for 125 mph (200 km/h) operation, the ECML was the fastest main line in the UK until the opening of High Speed 1. The high speeds are possible because much of the line is on fairly straight track on the flatter, eastern side of England, through Lincolnshire and Cambridgeshire, though there are significant speed restrictions on curves, particularly north of Darlington and between Doncaster and Leeds. By contrast, the West Coast Main Line, which crosses the Trent Valley and the mountains of Cumbria, is more sinuous, and had a lower speed limit of 110 mph (180 km/h). Speeds on the West Coast Main Line (WCML) were increased with the introduction of tilting Pendolino trains and now match the 125 mph speeds on the ECML.

== Rolling stock ==
=== Commuter trains ===
Family	Class	Image	Type	Top speed		Operator	Routes
Family	Class	Image	Type	mph	km/h	Operator	Routes
BR Sprinter	Class 156		DMU	75	120	Northern Trains	Newcastle to Chathill
BR Sprinter	Class 158		DMU	90	145	ScotRail, East Midlands Railway	Fife Circle Line, Highland Main Line, Borders Railway. Also between Grantham and Peterborough on East Midlands Railway services.
Bombardier Turbostar	Class 170		DMU	100	161	ScotRail, East Midlands Railway	Fife Circle Line, Highland Main Line, Borders Railway. Also between Grantham and Peterborough on East Midlands Railway services.
Siemens Desiro	Class 185		DMU	100	161	TransPennine Express	Joining the ECML at York and continuing to Newcastle
CAF Civity	Class 331		EMU	100	161	Northern Trains	Leeds to Doncaster
Alstom Coradia Juniper	Class 334		EMU	90	145	ScotRail	North Clyde Line
Bombardier Electrostar	Class 379		EMU	100	161	Govia Thameslink Railway	London to Peterborough, Cambridge, Ely, and King's Lynn
Siemens Desiro	Class 380		EMU	100	161	ScotRail	North Berwick Line
Hitachi AT200	Class 385		EMU	100	161	ScotRail	North Berwick Line
Bombardier Electrostar	Class 387		EMU	110	177	Govia Thameslink Railway	London to Peterborough, Cambridge, Ely, and King's Lynn
Siemens Desiro	Class 700		EMU	100	161	Govia Thameslink Railway	London King's Cross to Cambridge and Letchworth Garden City, Cambridge to Brighton via London Bridge, Peterborough to Horsham via London Bridge
Siemens Desiro	Class 717		EMU	85	137	Govia Thameslink Railway	Moorgate and London King's Cross to Welwyn Garden City, Hertford North, Stevenage, and Letchworth Garden City

=== High-speed trains ===
Family	Class	Image	Type	Top speed		Operator	Routes
Family	Class	Image	Type	mph	km/h	Operator	Routes
InterCity 225	Class 91		Electric locomotive	125	200	London North Eastern Railway	London King's Cross to Leeds, York and Newcastle
InterCity 225	Mark 4 coach		Passenger coach	125	200	London North Eastern Railway	London King's Cross to Leeds, York and Newcastle
InterCity 225	Driving Van Trailer		Control car	125	200	London North Eastern Railway	London King's Cross to Leeds, York and Newcastle
Alstom Coradia	Class 180 Adelante		DMU	125	200	Grand Central	Services from London King's Cross to Sunderland and Bradford Interchange
Bombardier Voyager	Class 220		DEMU	125	200	CrossCountry	Joins the ECML at either Doncaster or York and continues to Newcastle, Edinburgh, Glasgow, Dundee and Aberdeen
Bombardier Voyager	Class 221		DEMU	125	200	CrossCountry; Grand Central	Joins the ECML at either Doncaster or York and continues to Newcastle, Edinburgh Waverley, Glasgow Central, Dundee and Aberdeen; Services from London King's Cross to Bradford Interchange
Hitachi AT300	Class 800 Azuma		BMU	125	200	London North Eastern Railway	London King's Cross to Leeds, Lincoln, Hull, York, Middlesbrough, Newcastle, Edinburgh, Harrogate, Aberdeen and Inverness
Hitachi AT300	Class 801 Azuma		EMU	125	200	London North Eastern Railway	London King's Cross to Leeds, York, Newcastle and Edinburgh
Hitachi AT300	Class 802 Nova 1		BMU	125	200	TransPennine Express	Joins the ECML at York and continues to Newcastle and Edinburgh
Hitachi AT300	Class 802 Paragon		BMU	125	200	Hull Trains	London King's Cross to Hull and Beverley
Hitachi AT300	Class 803		EMU	125	200	Lumo	London King's Cross to Edinburgh and Glasgow

== Operators ==
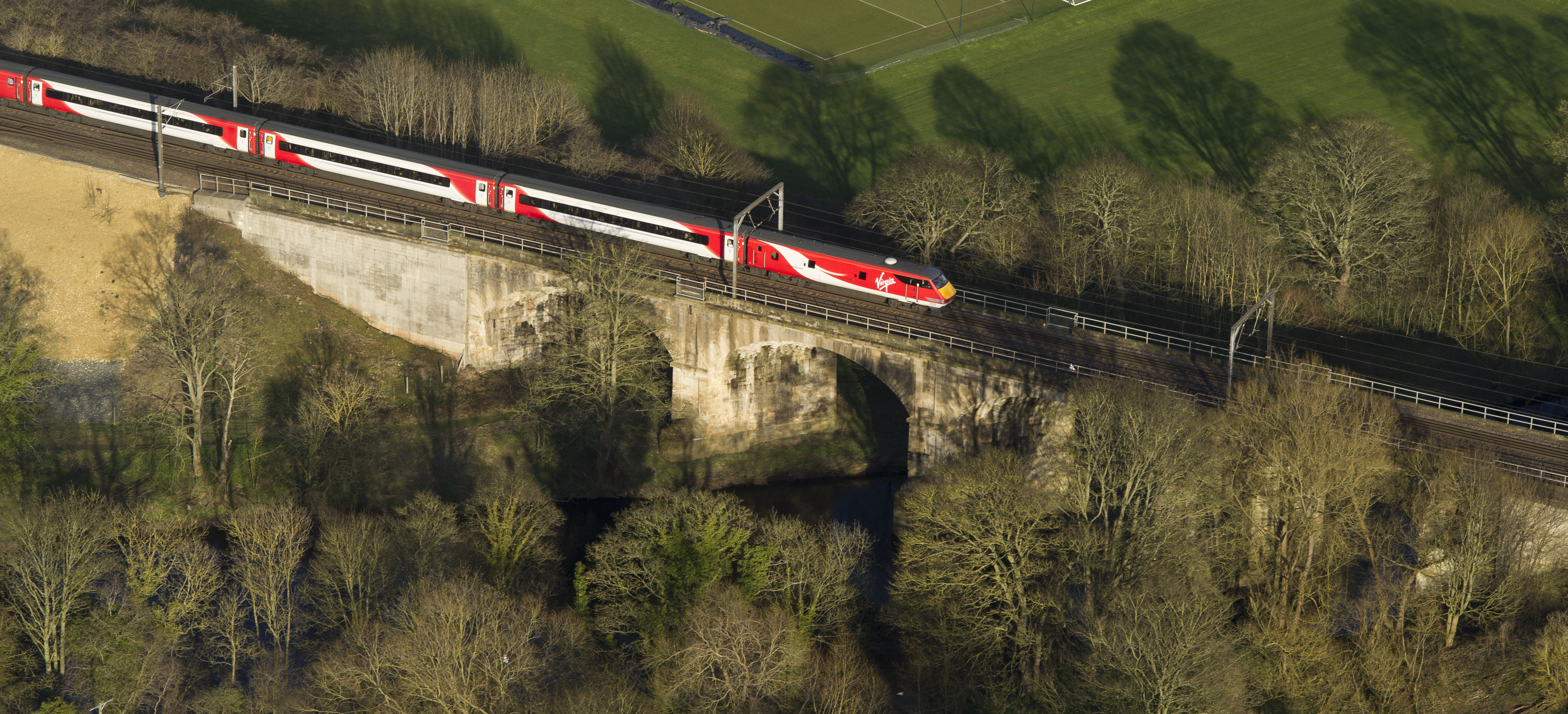
A train operated by the former main provider of services on the line, Virgin Trains East Coast

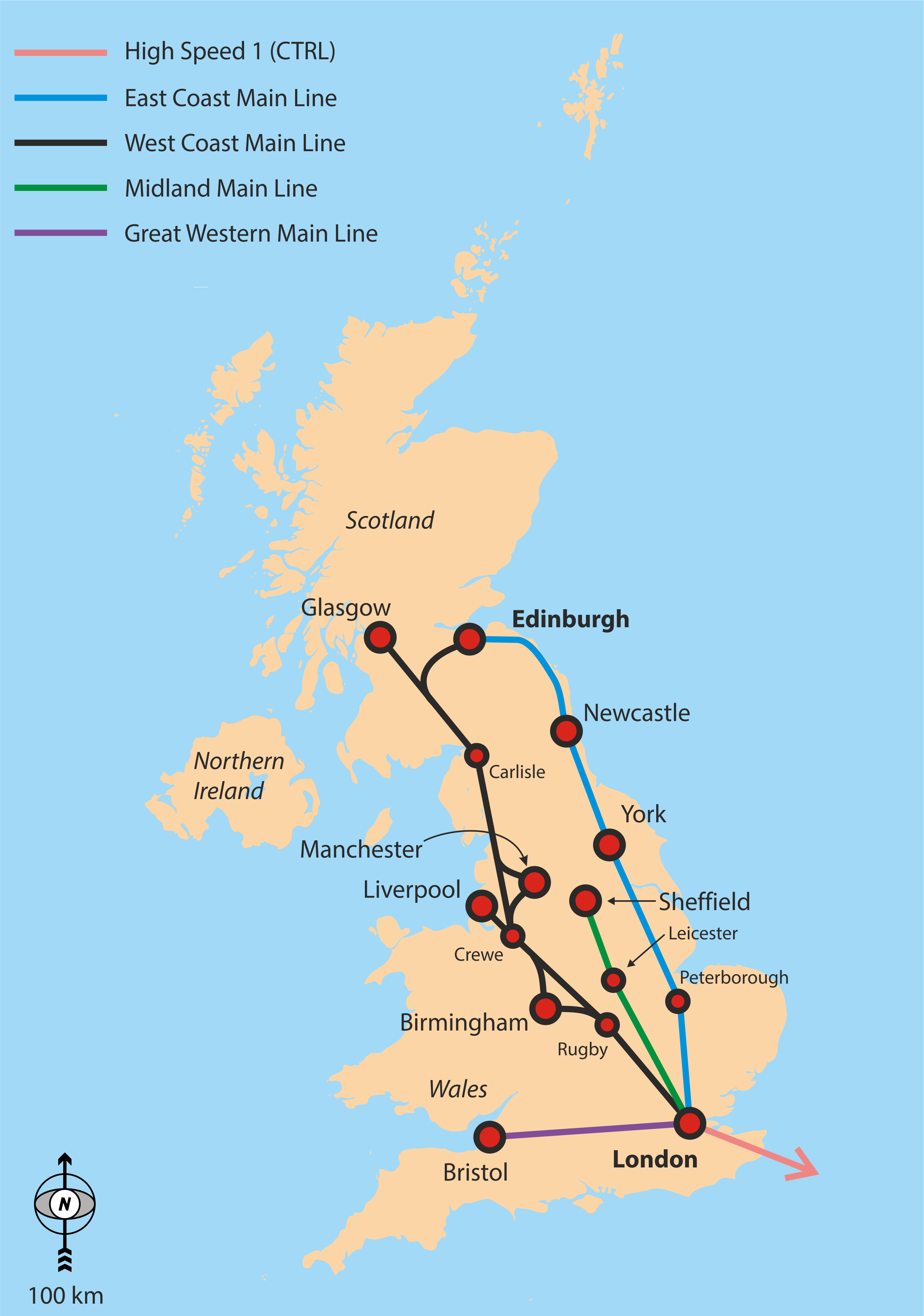
Overview of the ECML (in blue) and other north–south main lines in Great Britain

The line's current principal operator is London North Eastern Railway (LNER), whose services include regular long-distance expresses between London King's Cross, the East Midlands, Yorkshire, the North East of England and Scotland. LNER is operated on behalf of the Department for Transport by a consortium of Arup Group, Ernst & Young and SNC-Lavalin Rail & Transit, which took over from Virgin Trains East Coast on 24 June 2018.

Other operators of passenger trains on the line are:

- Great Northern: medium-distance services between London King's Cross, Peterborough, Cambridge and King's Lynn and commuter services between Moorgate and Stevenage via either Welwyn Garden City or the Hertford Loop. However TfL submitted an outline business case to take over the section between Moorgate and Welwyn Garden City and transfer it to the London Overground.
- Hull Trains: operates five trains per day between London King's Cross and Hull and two per day between London King's Cross and Beverley on weekdays, while at weekends there are five trains per day between London King's Cross and Hull.
- East Midlands Railway: local services between Grantham and Peterborough, part of the service that runs between Liverpool Lime Street and Norwich.
- CrossCountry: cross-country services north of Sheffield are routed via either Leeds or Doncaster. Leeds trains use the ECML between Wakefield Westgate and Leeds and then again north of York. Doncaster trains use the ECML north of Doncaster. Services run to and beyond Edinburgh. Occasional services run from Doncaster to Leeds before rejoining the ECML at York.
- TransPennine Express: between Liverpool Lime Street and Newcastle, also between Manchester Airport and Saltburn before they divert off the ECML to Saltburn via Yarm and Middlesbrough.
- Northern Trains: suburban services from Doncaster to Leeds and Chathill to Newcastle via Morpeth and infrequent services between Newcastle and Darlington that continue to Middlesbrough and Saltburn. Services between Selby and York also use the line from Hambleton Junction to York.
- ScotRail: services from Edinburgh Waverley to North Berwick and Dunbar.
- Grand Central: operates five daily services between London King's Cross and Sunderland, branching off the main line at Northallerton; and four daily services between London King's Cross and Bradford, branching off at Doncaster.
- Lumo: operates five daily services between London King's Cross and Edinburgh, calling at Stevenage, Newcastle and Morpeth.

Eurostar previously held the rights to run five trains a day on the line for services from mainland Europe to cities north of London, as part of the Regional Eurostar plan, which never came to fruition.

The overnight Caledonian Sleeper occasionally uses the ECML when engineering works prevent it from using its normal train path on the WCML.

DB Cargo UK, Direct Rail Services, Freightliner and GB Railfreight operate freight services.

== Development ==
=== Capacity problems ===
The ECML is one of the busiest lines on the British rail network and there is insufficient capacity on parts of the line to satisfy all the requirements of both passenger and freight operators.

There are bottlenecks at the following locations:

- The section of twin track within a four-line section at Welwyn North over the Digswell Viaduct and through the Welwyn tunnels
- The twin and triple-track sections located between Huntingdon and Peterborough.
- Just north of Newark station at a flat crossing with the Nottingham to Lincoln Line.
- The section of double track between Stoke Tunnel and Doncaster.
- The north throat of York station including Skelton Bridge Junction
- South of Newcastle to Northallerton (which is also predominately double track), leading to proposals to reopen the Leamside line to passenger and freight traffic.

Railway operations are vulnerable during high winds and there have been several de-wirements over the years due to the unusually wide spacing (up to 75 m) between the supporting masts of the overhead lines. The other cost-reduction measure was the use of headspan catenary support systems over the quadruple track sections – as employed in the Weaver Junction to Glasgow Electrification on the WCML during the 1970s. Headspans do not have mechanically independent registration (MIR) of each electrified road and thus are more complex to set up, compared to TTC (twin-track cantilever) and portal style support structures, during installation. In the event of a de-wirement of a given road, headspans result in the need to correctly set up the OLE of adjacent roads before the line can reopen to electric traction. This was a result of extreme pressure from the Department for Transport to reduce avoidable costs when the line was originally electrified between 1985 and 1990.

=== Recent developments ===
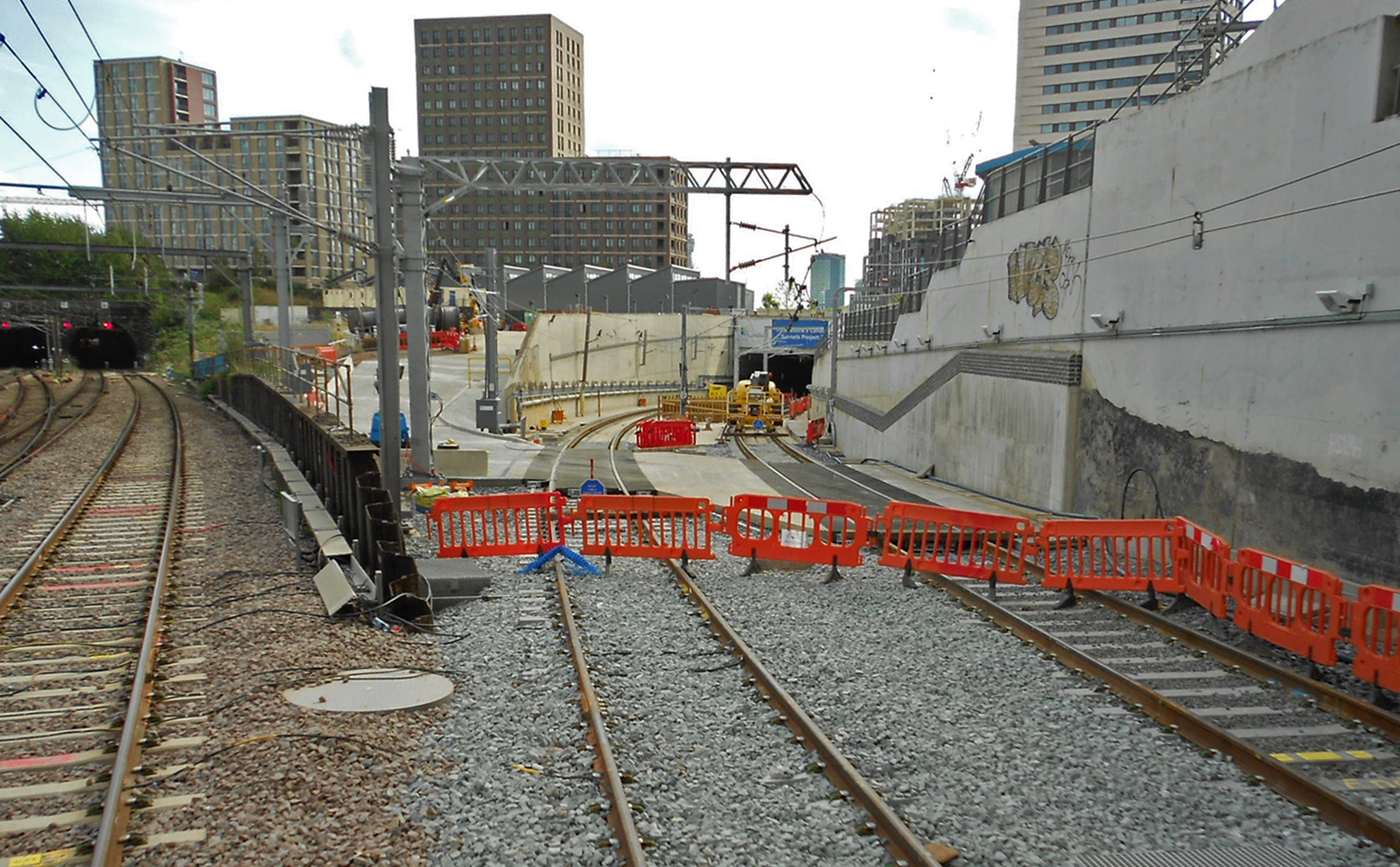
The Canal Tunnels' northern entrance at Belle Isle Junction

- The Allington Chord was constructed near Grantham in 2006, allowing services between Nottingham and Skegness to call at Grantham without having to use the ECML, trains now passing under the line. This provided sufficient extra capacity for 12 additional services between Leeds and London each day.
- Connection of the ECML to Thameslink at Belle Isle Jnc. via the Canal Tunnels as part of the Thameslink Programme (for Thameslink and Great Northern commuter services to extend to Brighton and Horsham).
- At the southern end of York station a short length of fourth track was installed in early 2011 at Holgate Junction with accompanying OLE and signalling systems. This work helped to remove one of the bottlenecks on the East Coast Main Line. Previously, trains from Leeds would sometimes have to wait before entering the station. The improvement allows for better flow of trains in and out of the station.
- Provision of a £47 million grade-separated junction to the north of Hitchin (the Hitchin flyover) enabling down Cambridge trains to cross the main line. The work was completed by 26 June 2013.
- Major remodelling of Peterborough station was completed during early 2014 providing three platform faces for services in the up direction towards London and two for ECML services travelling north on the down lines. An additional two platform faces are also available for Cross Country services to and from stations to the east of Peterborough.
- A new flying junction just south of Joan Croft level crossing in South Yorkshire to allow freight trains from Immingham to pass over the line on their way to Eggborough and Drax power stations, was completed in very early 2014. The project, known as the North Doncaster Chord, also replaced the level crossing on a minor road with a new overbridge just to the north of the original crossing point.
- Renewal and gauge enhancement of the Great Northern and Great Eastern Line which runs parallel to the ECML between Peterborough and Doncaster. This removes freight traffic from a heavily congested section of the ECML.
- A new rail operating centre (ROC), with training facilities, opened in early 2014 at the "Engineer's Triangle" in York. The ROC will enable signalling and day-to-day operations of the route to be undertaken in a single location. Signalling control/traffic management using ERTMS is scheduled to be introduced from 2020 on the ECML between London King's Cross and Doncaster – managed from the York ROC.
- An £8.6 million redevelopment of Newcastle station was completed in 2014 enhancing the existing station and provide a state-of-the-art station for thousands of passengers.
- Platform extensions at Stevenage, Grantham, Newark North Gate, Northallerton, Durham and Edinburgh Waverley stations for the InterCity Express Programme.
- Linespeed enhancement on the down slow line in the Fletton area (part of the ECML Connectivity programme) completed in March 2019.
- Additional 130-metre terminal platform on the down side for Hertford Loop trains at Stevenage, with an extra track from Langley Junction, was started in early 2019 and opened for use on 2 August 2020.
- Werrington Grade Separation was a £200 million scheme to increase capacity north of Peterborough station by constructing a dive under to route rail traffic between the Stamford Lines and the GNGE line, thereby avoiding at-grade conflicts on the ECML. The project was approved in summer 2018. It was officially opened by the Rail Minister Chris Heaton-Harris on 14 December 2021.
- King's Cross throat remodelling, completed in June 2021, to improve capacity and introduce higher speed turnouts reducing journey times.

=== Planned or proposed developments ===
The European Union Directive 96/48/EC, Annex 1 defines high-speed rail's minimum speed limit as 200 km/h (124 mph) on existing lines which have been specially upgraded.

Over the years, successive infrastructure managers have developed schemes for route improvements. The most recent of these is the £247 million "ECML Connectivity Fund" included in the 2012 HLOS with the objective of increasing capacity and reducing journey times. Current plans include the following schemes:

- Power supply enhancement on the diversionary Hertford Loop route.
- Additional turnback facility at Gordon Hill (part of the ECML Connectivity programme).
- Requadrupling of the route between Huntingdon and Woodwalton (HW4T), which was rationalised in the 1980s during electrification (part of the ECML Connectivity programme). This also involves the closure and diversion of a level crossing at Abbots Ripton which was approved in November 2017.
- Enhanced passenger access to the platforms at Peterborough and Stevenage.
- Replacement of the flat crossing at Newark with a flyover (scheme developed to GRIP Stage 2 by Jacobs).
- Upgrading of the Down Fast line at Shaftholme Junction from 100 mph to 125 mph and higher-speed associated crossovers (part of the ECML Connectivity programme).
- Modified north throat at York station to reduce congestion for services calling at platforms 9 – 11 (part of the ECML Connectivity programme).
- Freight loops between York and Darlington (part of the ECML Connectivity programme).
- Darlington station up fast line platform and future station remodelling as part of HS2.
- Fitment of TASS balises and gauging/structure works proposed by the open-access operator GNER (Alliance Rail) to enable tilt operation of Class 390 Pendolino trains north of Darlington station, supporting its aspirations for express 3hr43min London to Edinburgh services.

The following projects are on a more route-wide basis:

- Power supply upgrades (PSU) between Wood Green and Bawtry (Phase 1 – completed in September 2017) and Bawtry to Edinburgh (Phase 2), including some overhead lines (OLE) support improvements, rewiring of the contact and catenary wires, and headspan to portal conversions (HS2P) which were installed at Conington in January 2018. This will include installation of static frequency converter (Frequency changer) technology at Hambleton Junction and Marshall Meadows Bay area.
- Level-crossing closures between King's Cross and Doncaster: As of July 2015 this will no longer be conducted as a single closure of 73 level crossings but will be conducted on a case-by case basis (for example, Abbots Ripton Level Crossing will close as part of the HW4T scheme).
- Increasing maximum speeds on the fast lines between Woolmer Green and Dalton-on-Tees up to 140 mph (225 km/h) in conjunction with the introduction of the InterCity Express Programme, level-crossing closures, ERTMS fitments, OLE rewiring and the OLE PSU – estimated to cost £1.3 billion (2014). This project is referred to as "L2E4" or London to Edinburgh (in) 4 Hours. L2E4 examined the operation of the IEP at 140 mph on the ECML and the sections of track which can be upgraded to permit this, together with the engineering and operational costs.
- In June 2020 it was reported that the UK government would provide £350 million to fund the UK's first digital signalling system on a long-distance rail route. The signalling is to be fitted on a 100-mile (161 km) section of the East Coast Main Line between King's Cross, London, and Lincolnshire, which will allow trains to run closer together and increase service frequency, speed and reliability. The first trains are expected to operate on the East Coast Main Line using this digital signalling technology by the end of 2025, with all improvements scheduled for completion by 2030.

== Accidents ==
There have been several incidents on the ECML, resulting in death and serious injury:

Title	Date	Killed	Injured	Note
Welwyn Tunnel rail crash	9 June 1866	2	2	Three-train collision in tunnel, caused by guard's failure to protect train and signalling communications error
Hatfield rail crash (1870)	26 December 1870	8	3	Wheel disintegrated causing derailment killing six passengers and two bystanders
Abbots Ripton rail disaster	21 January 1876	13	59	Flying Scotsman crashed during a blizzard.
Morpeth rail crash (1877)	25 March 1877	5	17	Derailment caused by faulty track.
Thirsk rail crash (1892)	2 November 1892	10	43	Signalman forgot about a goods train standing at his box and accepted the Scotch Express onto his line.
Grantham rail accident	19 August 1906	14	17	Runaway or overspeed on junction curve causing derailment – no definite cause established.
Cramlington Miners Strike derailment	10 May 1926		2	The Flying Scotsman was derailed by a group miners during the General Strike between Cramlington and Annisford.
Welwyn Garden City rail crash	15 June 1935	14	29	Two trains collided due to a signaller's error.
King's Cross railway accident	4 February 1945	2	26	A train slipped on gradient and rolled back into station.
Browney rail crash	5 January 1946	10	18	A northbound express hits the wreckage of a derailed goods train.
Potters Bar rail crash	10 February 1946	2	17	A local train hit buffers fouling main line, with wreckage hit by two further trains.
Doncaster rail crash (1947)	9 August 1947	18	188	A King's Cross to Leeds train was incorrectly signalled into a section already occupied by a stationary train, which resulted in a rear-end collision.
Goswick rail crash	26 October 1947	28	65	Edinburgh-London Flying Scotsman failed to slow down for a diversion and derailed. Signal passed at danger.
Doncaster rail crash	16 March 1951	14	12	Train derailed south of the station and struck a bridge pier.
Goswick Goods train derailment	28 October 1953		1	A Glasgow to Colchester goods train was derailed at Goswick.
Connington South rail crash	5 March 1967	5	18	Express train was derailed.
Thirsk rail crash	31 July 1967	7	45	Cement train derailed and was hit by a northbound express hauled by prototype locomotive DP2.
Morpeth rail crash (1969)	7 May 1969	6	46	Excessive speed on curve.
Penmanshiel Tunnel collapse	17 March 1979	2		Two workers killed when the tunnel collapsed during engineering works.
Morpeth rail crash (1984)	24 June 1984		35	Excessive speed on curve.
Newcastle Central railway station collision	30 November 1989		15	Two InterCity expresses collided.
Morpeth rail crash (1992)	13 November 1992	1		Collision between two freight trains.
Morpeth rail crash (1994)	27 June 1994		1	Excessive speed led to the locomotive and the majority of carriages overturning.
Hatfield rail crash	17 October 2000	4	70	InterCity 225 derailed due to a failure to replace a fractured rail. The accident highlighted poor management at Railtrack and led to its partial renationalisation.
Great Heck rail crash	28 February 2001	10	82	A Land Rover Defender swerved down an embankment off the M62 motorway into the path of a southbound GNER InterCity 225, which then was struck by a freight train hauled by a Class 66. The Class 91 locomotive was the same one that was involved in the Hatfield rail crash – 91023. Following repair and refurbishment, the locomotive was renumbered 91132.
Potters Bar rail crash (2002)	10 May 2002	7	70	Derailment caused by a badly maintained set of points. Resulted in the end of the use of external contractors for routine maintenance.

== In popular culture ==
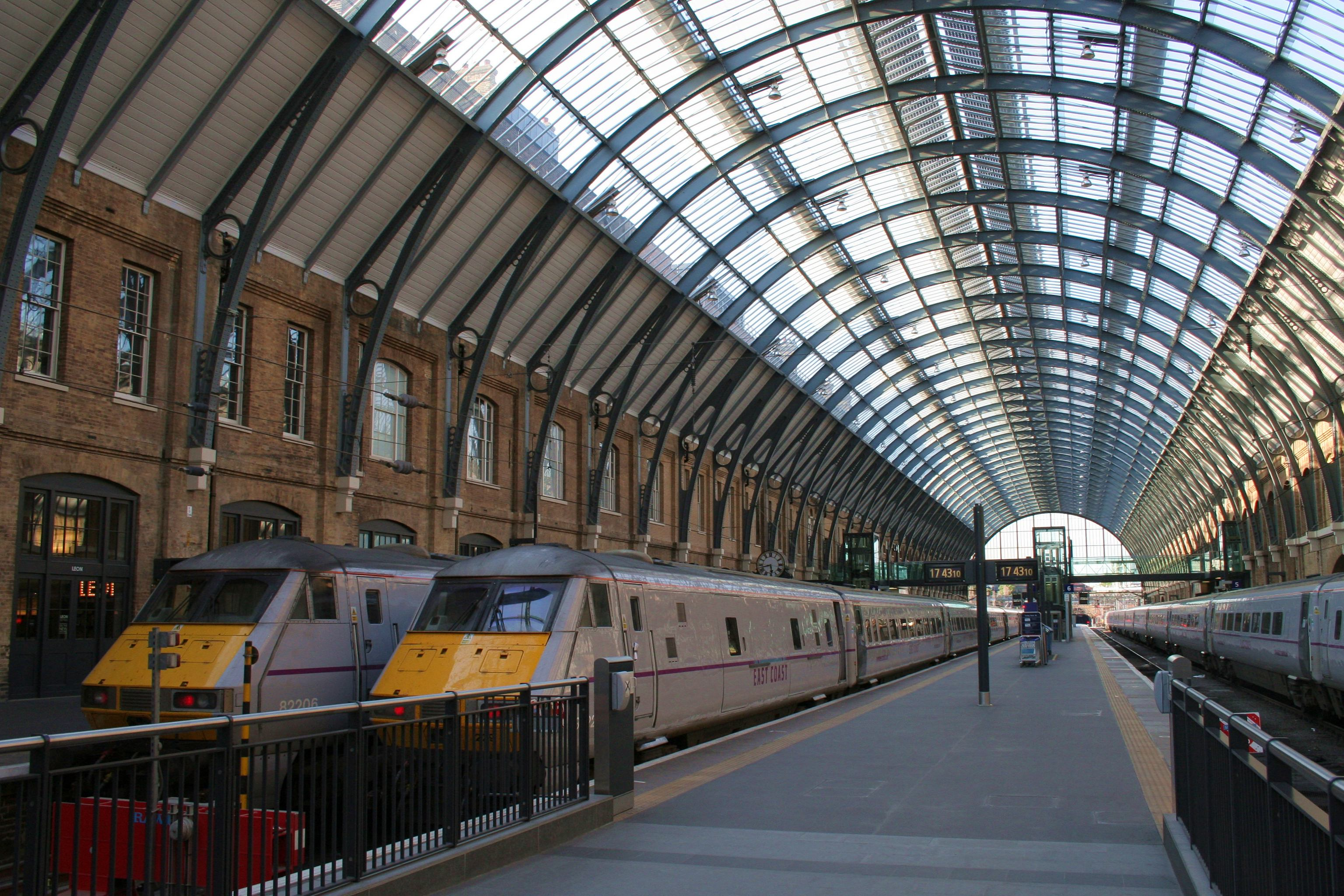
East Coast trains at London King's Cross

The cuttings and tunnel entrances just north of King's Cross appear in the 1955 Ealing comedy film The Ladykillers.

Also during the 1950s, the line featured in the 1954 documentary short Elizabethan Express. Later, the 1971 British gangster film Get Carter features a journey from London King's Cross to Newcastle in the opening credits. During 2009, the motoring show Top Gear featured a long-distance race, in which LNER A1 60163 Tornado, a Jaguar XK120 and a Vincent Black Shadow competed to be the fastest vehicle to travel the full length of the line from London to Edinburgh.

The route has been featured in several train simulator games. Trainz Simulator 2010 features the route between London and York, Trainz Simulator 12 extends the route to Newcastle, and Trainz: A New Era brings it all the way to Edinburgh, allowing the entire 393-mile route to be driven. Train Sim World as part of their fourth installment, features the route between Peterborough and Doncaster with the LNER Class 801 and DB Cargo UK Class 66 in a weathered EWS livery.

King's Cross station is also depicted as the starting point of the Hogwarts Express in the books and films of the Harry Potter franchise. This connection is marked by a tourist attraction within the station concourse, featuring the platform 9 3/4 sign and a luggage trolley partially embedded in the station wall with an owl cage and suitcases on it.

== See also ==
- Chiltern Main Line
- Great Western Main Line
- Highland Main Line
- Midland Main Line
- West Coast Main Line
