= 1951 Doncaster rail crash =

Railway accident near Doncaster, England

Coordinates: 53°30′53″N 1°08′24″W

Doncaster rail crash

Details
- Date: 16 March 1951; 10:09
- Location: South of Doncaster railway station
- Country: England
- Line: East Coast Main Line
- Cause: Poor track maintenance

Statistics
- Trains: 1
- Deaths: 14
- Injured: 12

The Doncaster rail crash was a railway accident that took place near to Doncaster, England.

On 16 March 1951 the 10:04 Doncaster to London King's Cross consisting of 14 coaches (and a horse box at the rear) hauled by a LNER Thompson Class A2/2 No 60501 Cock o' the North locomotive left the station. Shortly afterwards the train was negotiating a tight crossover with a speed limit of 10 mph. The driver claimed he took the crossover at around 15 mph as he had done previously but the 3rd coach derailed. The leading end of the coach followed the front of the train and went to the right of a pier supporting Balby Bridge (which carries a road junction over the line), but the rear of the coach, propelled by the weight of the following train went to the left, wrapping the coach around the pier, killing 14 passengers and seriously injuring 12 others.

== Cause ==
Investigation of the accident concluded that poor maintenance of the crossover was the primary cause with bolts supporting the crossover assembly missing or cracked.
