= Knottingley railway station =

Railway station in West Yorkshire, England

Knottingley
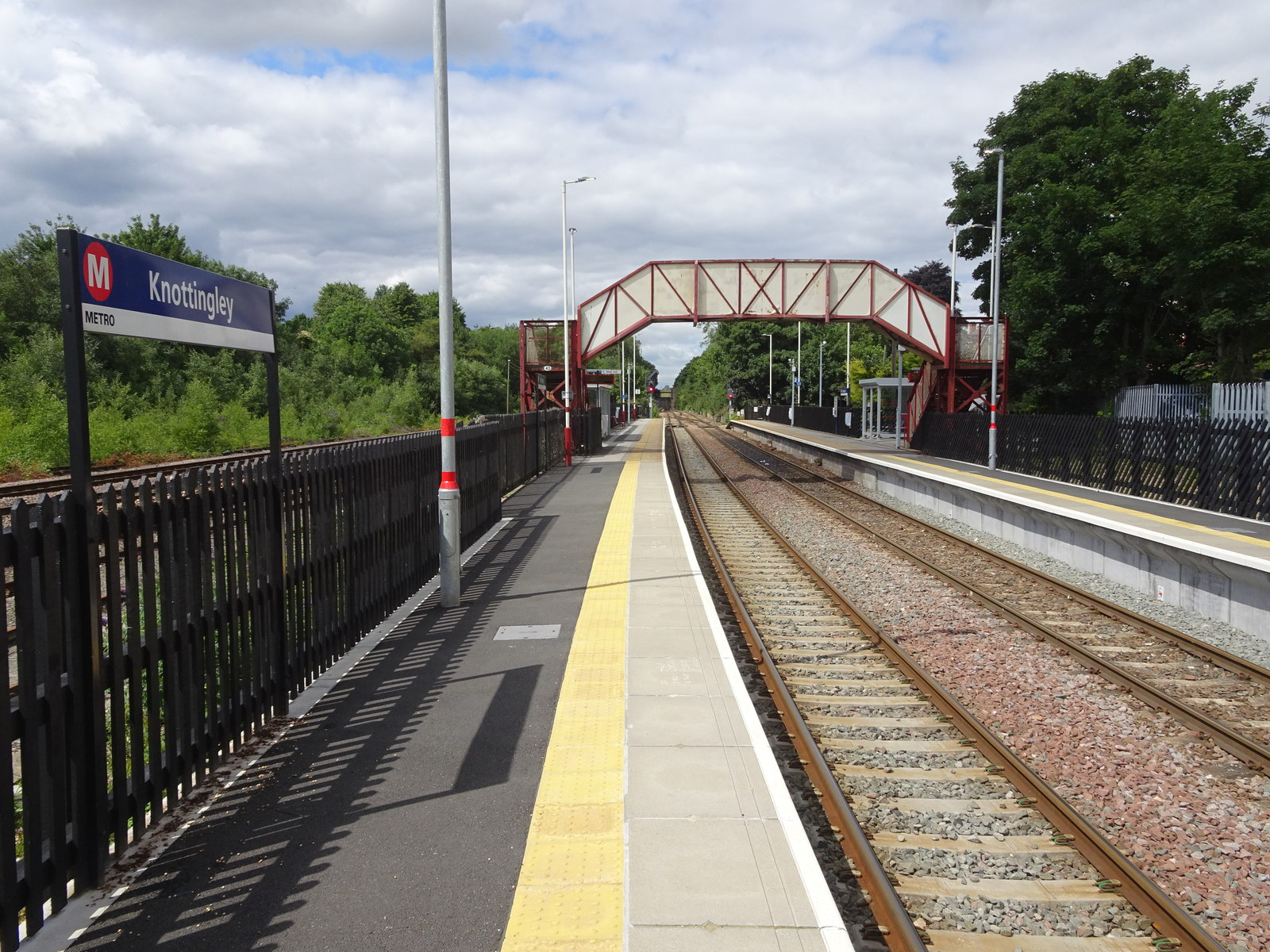

General information
- Location: Knottingley, City of Wakefield, England
- Coordinates: 53.7065°N 1.2590°W
- Grid reference: SE490235
- Managed by: Northern Trains
- Transit authority: West Yorkshire Metro
- Platforms: 2

Other information
- Station code: KNO
- Fare zone: 3
- Classification: DfT category F1

History
- Opened: 1 April 1848

Passengers
- 2020/21: ▼51,188
- 2021/22: ▲0.136 million
- 2022/23: ▲0.150 million
- 2023/24: ▲0.160 million
- 2024/25: ▼0.156 million
Location
Notes
- Passenger statistics from the Office of Rail and Road

Knottingley railway station serves the town of Knottingley, in West Yorkshire, England. It lies on the Pontefract Line and is 16 miles (26 km) south-east of Leeds; services are operated by Northern Trains. The station is the final one in West Yorkshire before the North Yorkshire border; most services terminate or commence there.

== History ==
The station was constructed by the Wakefield, Pontefract & Goole Railway as part of their main line from Wakefield Kirkgate to Goole, which opened on 1 April 1848. It was not long though before it became a busy junction as, within two years, links to Doncaster, via the Askern branch (on 6 June 1848); Leeds, via Castleford and Methley Junction; (1 December 1849) and York, via Ferrybridge and Burton Salmon (1 August 1850) had all been opened. The first of those was jointly built and operated by the Lancashire and Yorkshire Railway and Great Northern Railway and the station also became jointly managed by these two companies in 1854. The Great Northern made use of its running powers and traffic agreements with the LYR to run through trains from Doncaster to both Leeds and York, putting the town on a new main line for a number of years until shorter, more direct lines could be constructed.

By 1871, the station had lost its trunk line status with the opening of new lines from Doncaster via Wakefield (to Leeds) and Selby (to York), but it still handled plenty of local passenger and freight traffic, particularly coal from a large number of collieries in the area.

Whilst all of the aforementioned lines are still open, only the original WP&G routes now carry passenger trains as services to York ended on 11 July 1947 and those to Doncaster just over a year later on 27 September 1948. The line to Wakefield Kirkgate also lost its passenger trains from 2 January 1967, leaving only the route to Leeds serving the station; it was reopened on 11 May 1992, with financial assistance from West Yorkshire PTE. Services on the Leeds line were rerouted via the former NER station at Castleford from 7 October 1968.

Regular passenger trains on the Askern line now operate once again, commencing on 23 May 2010 after an absence of more than 60 years. This was following the decision to grant open access operator Grand Central track access rights for a new service between London King's Cross and Bradford Interchange in January 2009. These run via the Askern line, Pontefract, Wakefield and Brighouse to reach Bradford, but are not able to call at Knottingley as the old Doncaster line platforms have long been removed.

Knottingley TMD lies just east of the station, on the triangle of lines that go to Knottingley, Askern and Whitley Bridge. It opened in 1967 to maintain the locomotives and hopper wagons for the planned 75 Merry-go-round trains a day expected to use the Wakefield and Goole line. As much of the coal traffic has now ceased, the depot closed in 2020, but the lines are still used by occasional railway traffic.

== Facilities ==
Like most of the stations on the route, Knottingley station has lost its main buildings and now only has standard waiting shelters on each of its two remaining platforms. Digital display screens, timetable posters and customer help points are located on both sides to offer train running information. Both platforms are signalled for use in either direction, so it is advisable to check the display screens prior to travel to determine which one is being used for a particular train. Step-free access is only available to platform 2 from the car park - the footbridge to platform 1 has stairs and is the only means of access to it.

== Services ==
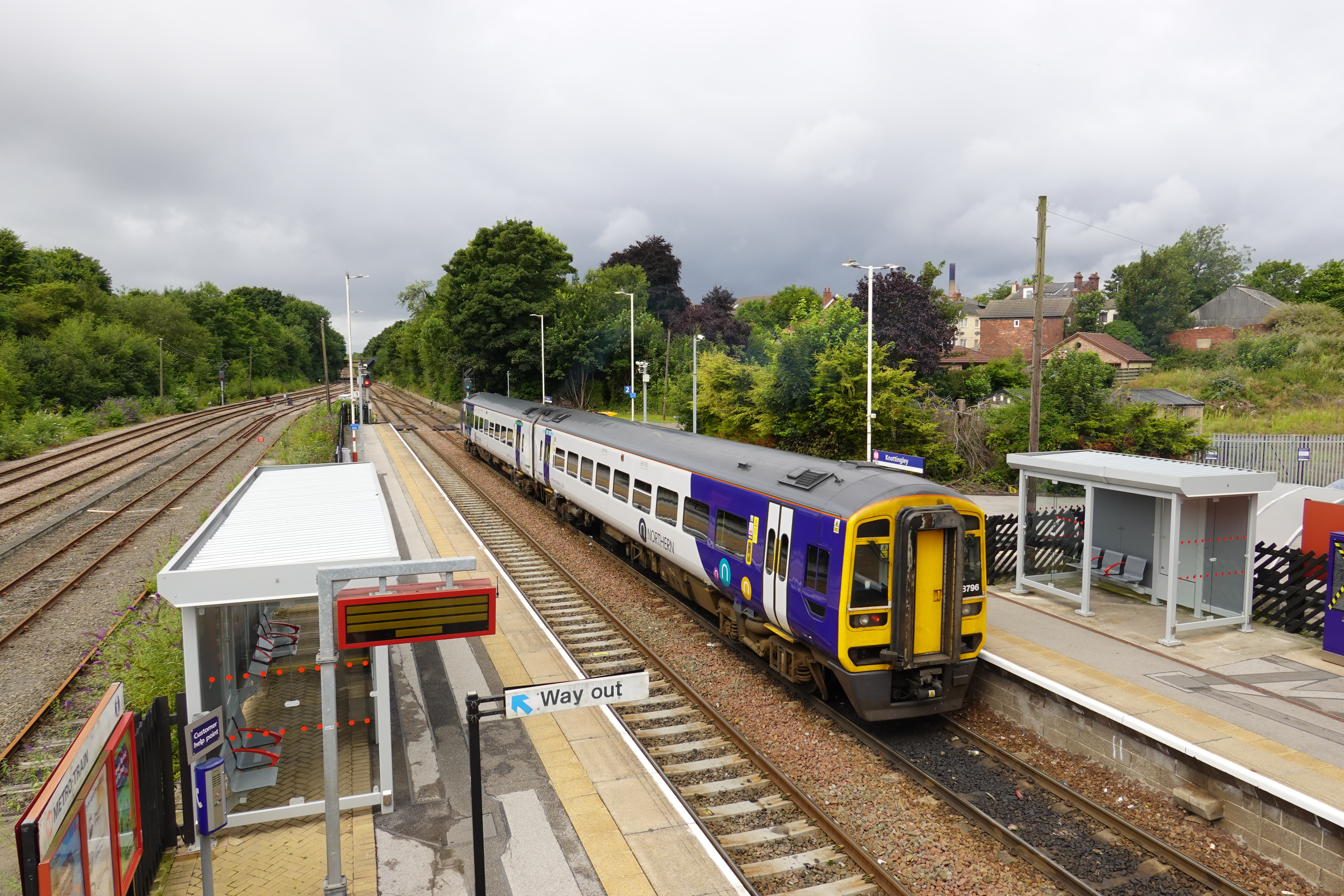
A Northern Trains Class 158 calls at the station, August 2021

There is a half-hourly service from Knottingley to Leeds; one runs via Castleford and the other via Featherstone and Wakefield Westgate. One train to and two trains from Goole run on Mondays to Saturdays. On Sundays, there is an hourly service to/from Leeds (alternating via Castleford and Wakefield), but there are no eastbound trains.

Preceding station	National Rail	Following station
Pontefract Monkhill	Northern Trains Pontefract line	Terminus
Pontefract Monkhill	Northern Trains Pontefract line	Whitley Bridge Limited Service
	Disused railways	
Terminus	Lancashire and Yorkshire Railway Askern branch line	Womersley
