= Aire valley power stations =

Power stations in the Aire Valley, Yorkshire, England

Aire valley power station may refer to one or all of three power stations on the River Aire in Yorkshire, England:

- Ferrybridge C power station (1966–2016)
- Eggborough power station (1967–2018)
- Drax power station (1974–present)

By the 1990s, the three power stations generated 20% of Britain's electricity, and contributed 56% of the Yorkshire and Humber region's greenhouse gas emissions, primarily CO_{2} (~2010). In 2006 the combined generating capacity was approximately 8 GW (Ferrybridge C, 2 GW; Eggborough, 2 GW, Drax 4 GW).

The power stations were built during the post-Beeching era, close to the Selby Coalfield which supplied them via Gascoigne Wood until the field's closure at the beginning of the 21st century. Thereafter, coal was imported to fuel the power stations, much of it through the Humber ports (primarily Immingham, also Port of Hull) and other east coast ports (Redcar, Tyne, Blyth). Further coal was supplied from open cast coal mines in Ayrshire, Scotland, as well as being imported via Scotland (Hunterston Terminal).

Ferrybridge and Eggborough power stations were scheduled to close in March 2016. Ferrybridge closed according to schedule on 31 March 2016, while Eggborough continued to operate for almost two more years before being decommissioned in February 2018. By 2022, Ferrybridge and Eggborough were fully demolished.

== Demolition ==
In July 2019, one of the eight cooling towers was demolished with explosives as a test at Ferrybridge, then in October 2019, four of the seven remaining cooling towers were demolished. On 1 August 2021, four of the eight cooling towers at Eggborough were demolished. Later on 22 August, the two chimney stacks, boiler house and bunker bay were demolished at Ferrybridge. On 10 October 2021, the final four cooling towers at Eggborough were demolished. On 6 March 2022, the coal bunker building at Eggborough known as 'Bunker Bay' was demolished. On the evening of 17 March 2022, the three remaining cooling towers at Ferrybridge were demolished. On 1 June 2022, a section of the boiler house at Eggborough known as 'DA Bay' was demolished. On 24 July 2022, the chimney and boiler house were demolished at Eggborough.
