= Station Road =

Station Road may refer to:

- Station Road, Cambridge, leads to Cambridge railway station, England
- Station Road, Darley Dale, a cricket ground in Darley Dale, England
- Station Road, Newbridge, a sports venue located in Newbridge, County Kildare, Ireland
- Station Road, Swinton, a former rugby league Test match venue located in Pendlebury near Manchester, England
- Station Road (York), in England
