= Thomas Prosser (architect) =

British architect

- Born: c. 1817; London
- Died: 2 March 1888; Hardwicke Place, Gateshead
- Occupation: Architect
- Parent: Thomas Prosser (Father)
- Practice: North East Railway Company
- Buildings: York Railway Station
- Projects: Newcastle Central Station

Thomas Prosser (c. 1817–1888) was the company architect of the North Eastern Railway Company, the first to hold the position.

== Early life ==
Thomas Prosser spent his early years at Wynyard Park. It was here that his father, also Thomas, had been commissioned as architect in the rebuilding of Wynyard Park.

== Career ==
Prosser began his training in the office of architect Ignatius Bonomi (1787-1870) in Durham. It was Bonomi who was one of the designers of the Skerne Railway Bridge for the Stockton and Darlington Railway. The bridge is one of the oldest railway bridges in the world and the oldest still in use.

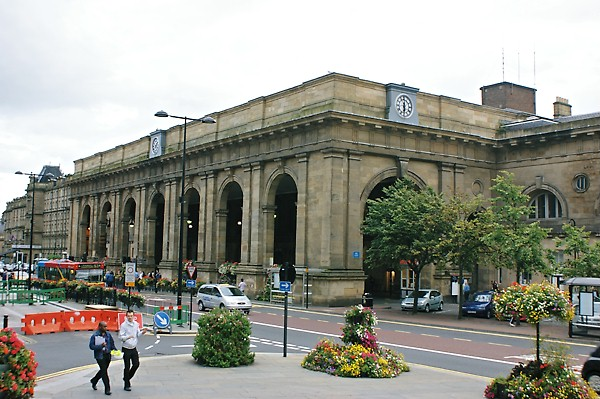
The portico of Newcastle Central Station

Prosser then went to Newcastle-upon-Tyne to work at the firm of John Dobson at the Newcastle Central Station project. It was Prosser who did some of the preparatory architectural drawings before going on to become the clerk of works. It was Prosser who drew up the plans for the station portico as a revision to the original design.

York Railway Station is another of Prosser's major works, with the train-shed regarded as ‘one of the great cathedrals of the Railway Age’. Prosser worked on the station in partnership with engineer Thomas Elliot Harrison.

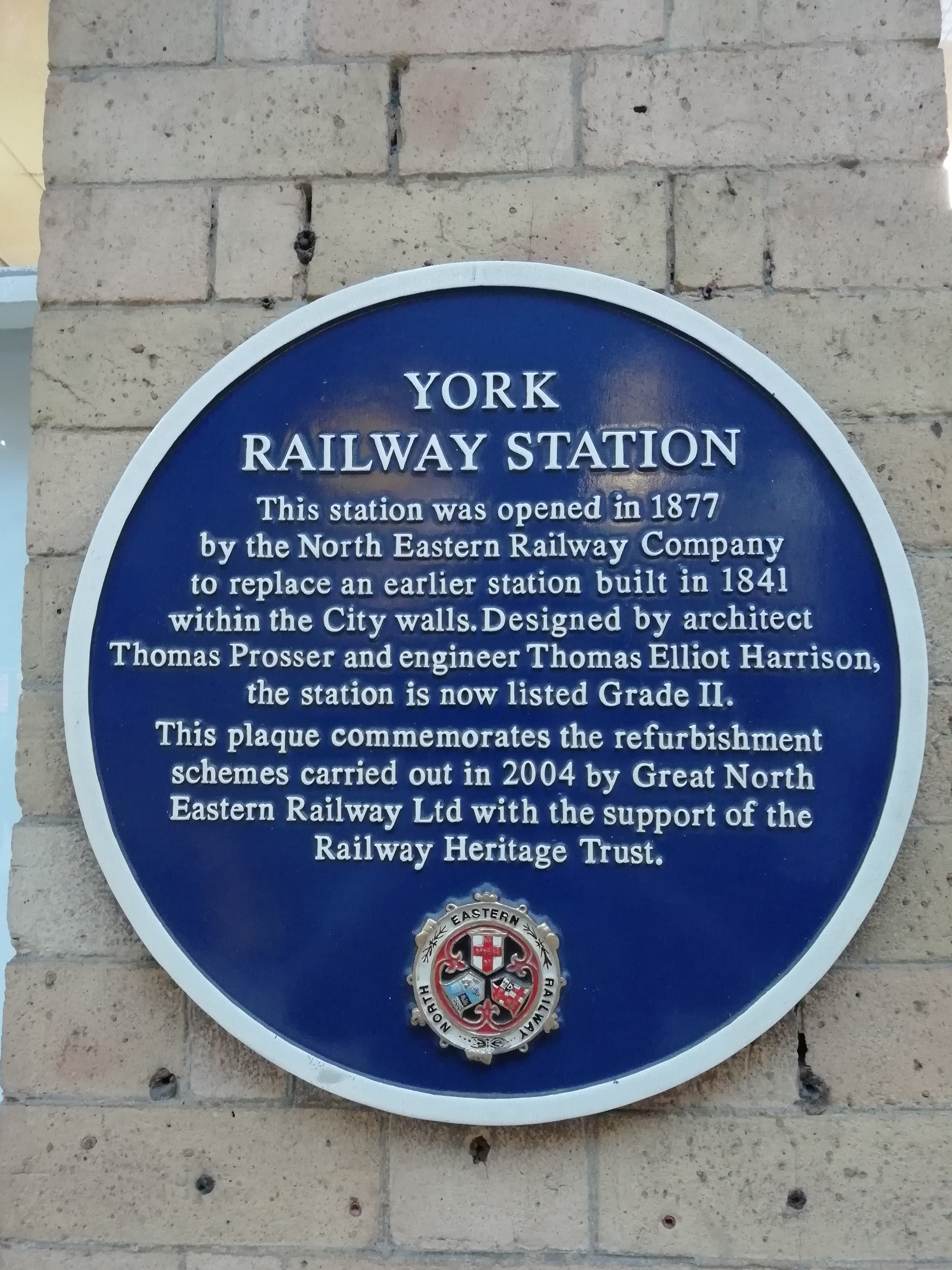
A plaque commemorating the restoration work at York Railway Station in 2004. It notes the work of Thomas Prosser and Thomas Elliott Harrison as architects.

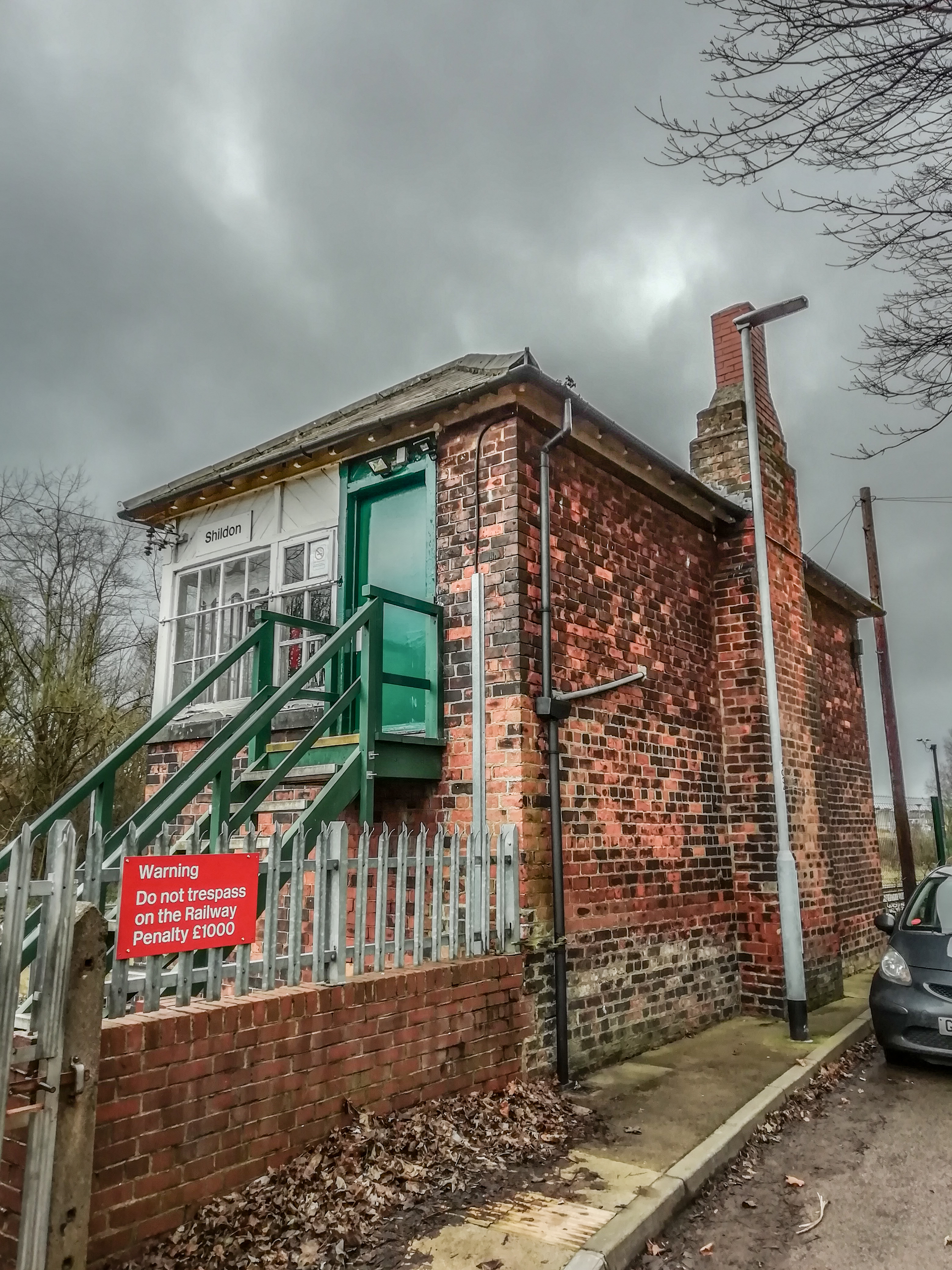
The Grade II listed signal box at Shildon, believe to have been designed by Thomas Prosser.

Suffering with ill heath Prosser retired in May 1874.

"I ought perhaps to have taken this step sooner but I have hoped from day to day to recover so as to perform satisfactorily the duties to which I am so much attached."

— Thomas Prosser – Letter of Resignation [1]

In recognition of his service the railway company granted Prosser a £300 a year allowance. These payments ran until June 1884 when they were transferred to his brother Robert, whom he was living with after his condition worsened.

Thomas Prosser died at his brothers home at Hardwicke Place, Gateshead on March 2, 1888. He never married.

== Other notable works ==
- Former Sculcoates Goods Station – Kingston upon Hull
- North York Moors Railway, Goathland Station - Goathland (Credited to the Office of Thomas Prosser)
- Former Immigrant Station and Railway Platform – Kingston upon Hull

This is particularly interesting as part of the history of immigration to the United States of America. The Hull facility was for the exclusive use by immigrants heading to America from north west Europe. They would sail to Hull and from there by train to Liverpool where they would sail for America. For reasons of health amongst others immigrants were kept separate from other travellers. The station had waiting facilities where immigrants could meet their ticket agents, wash and use the toilet as well as take shelter from the weather. It is estimated that 2.2. million people (mainly from Scandinavia and the Baltic) passed through here between 1836 and 1914.

- Hexham Railway Station – Hexham (Prosser worked on extensions to the building)
- Royal York Hotel and Area Railings Attached at Side and Rear – York
- Royal Station Hotel – Newcastle-Upon-Tyne
