= York Rail Operating Centre =

Regional railway signalling centre in York, Northern England

Coordinates: 53°57′22″N 1°05′49.7″W

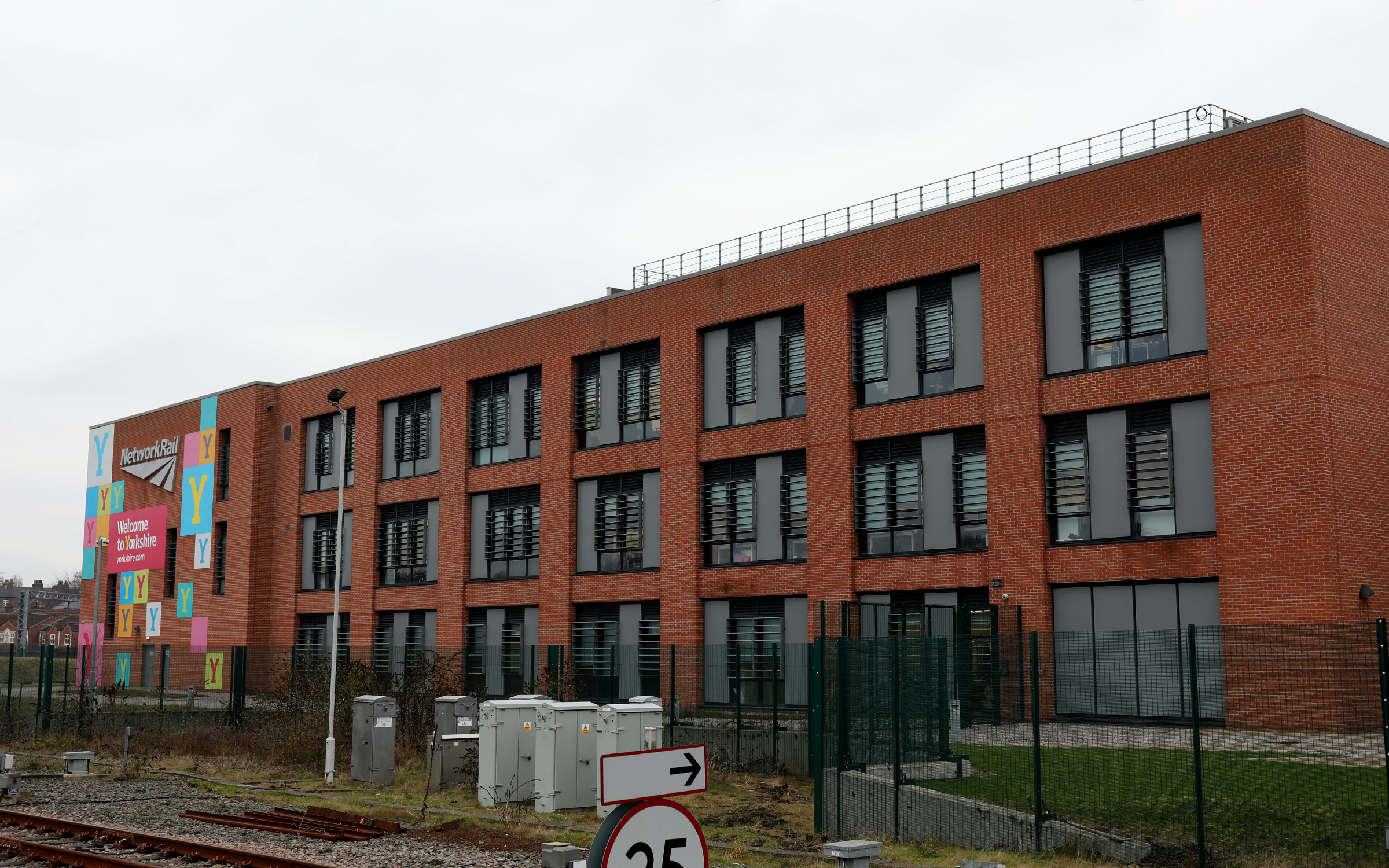
The ROC at York with Welcome to Yorkshire sign

York Rail Operating Centre (also known as York ROC) is a rail operating centre (ROC) located at the south western end of York railway station in York, England. The site is one of twelve that will control all signalling across the mainland of the United Kingdom. It was opened in stages from 2014 onwards, with responsibility for signalling becoming active in January 2015. The York ROC accepted the role of its predecessor, the adjacent York Integrated Electronic Control Centre (IECC), in December 2018.

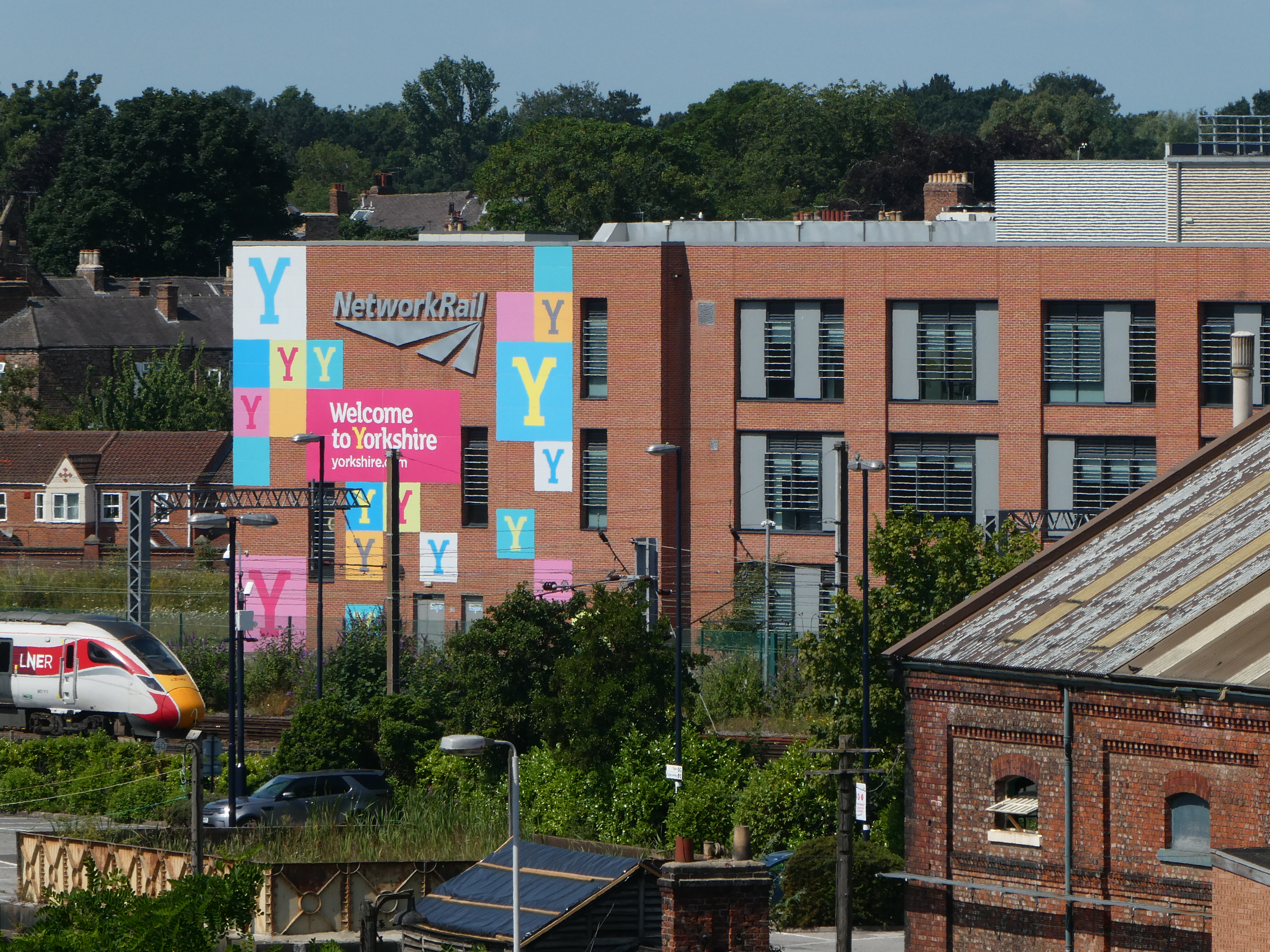
The ROC as seen from the York City Walls

Of the twelve ROC signalling centres that have been built across the regions for Network Rail, York is the largest and controls the London North Eastern (LNE) region which includes the East Coast Main Line between London King's Cross and the Scottish Borders.

== History ==
The centre, along with 13 others, was proposed in 2011 in an effort by Network Rail to combine train control, signalling and level crossing operations. (Note: Not all level crossings will be transferred by the new system. Whilst some will be automated, others will close altogether with alternative arrangements being implemented such as road flyovers. In the York ROC area of operations, one survivor is Crabley Creek (on the Selby Line), which used to be a signal box controlling the adjacent crossing. This will be retained as a crossing box as control is mandated to be operated by a human being on site as per the original deeds granting the railway access to the land when it was built in the 19th century.) In the project, 14 buildings would replace over 800 mechanical lever and power signalling boxes with Integrated Electronic Control Centres (IECC) also being superseded in the new programme. Preparatory work on the site in April 2012 revealed the foundations of some ex North Eastern Railway roundhouses that were thought to have been built in 1864 and abandoned in 1960. Work on the building was started in September 2012.

The £26 million centre was opened in September 2014 (Note: The eventual cost was £35 million) with kitting out taking three months so that the first signalling to be transferred there became operational in January 2015. As York ROC will be responsible for the East Coast Main Line (ECML) from King's Cross to the Scottish Borders and the whole of the London North Eastern (LNE) region, (Lincolnshire, County Durham, Northumberland, Tyne and Wear, Teesside and Yorkshire and the Humber), it will take some time for all signalling to be moved there. The last manual signal box is due to transfer to the ROC in 2056 from Morpeth, which should also be the last signal box to be transferred on the entire network.

The ROC is expected to eventually house 400 signallers replacing over 1,000 signallers across the whole of the LNE region. The ROC was built on the former Engineers Triangle to the immediate north west of the station; this area was previously used to turn steam engines, a movement that was able to be retained in York by the installation of a reconditioned turntable to the west of the freight yard in York (a little further north). The ROC at York includes a gym, training centre, welding centre and external rail facilities. As the site is also used for training, it is known dually as Network Rail York Campus and is equipped with a Workforce Development Centre (WDC) which includes tracks both indoors and outside, with the three sidings outside running to 490 feet (150 m) in length.

The building is faced externally in brick, whilst the other eleven ROCs are clad in steel and concrete; one of the conditions imposed by the planning permission given to the project was that it had to be in a style befitting to the nature of the City of York. The building won the best design in the Commercial property section at the Royal Institution of Chartered Surveyors Pro-Yorkshire awards in 2015.

The ROC at York will consist of the largest route mileage on the UK mainland railway system. It will "fringe" (adjoin other signalling areas) Glasgow ROC to the north, Manchester ROC to the west, Derby ROC to the south west and Romford ROC to the south east.

== Key signalling transfers ==
The ROC became operational in January 2015 and during the period from 2011 (when the creation of the ROCs was announced) to 2016, many lines were converted to power signal boxes (such as at Lincoln PSB), which will in turn be transferred to the ROC at York at a later date. Network Rail have a rolling programme of signalling upgrades, but those transferred so far include;

- December 2015–January 2016 - the network of lines between Scunthorpe and Cleethorpes covering the freight lines around Immingham. This project saw almost 57 miles (91 km) of railway signalling transferred to York, with the demise of 13 mechanical signal boxes.
- May 2016 - the lines between Sheffield, Rotherham, Swinton and Mexborough.
- January and October 2018 - the routes through Huddersfield and Healey Mills in January and the Calder Valley line (Bradford Interchange, Halifax and Hebden Bridge) in October 2018.
- November/December 2018 - the line between Hessle and Howden (the Selby to Hull line) which saw 11 crossings enhanced or upgraded.
- December 2018 - Transfer of the all lines previously controlled by the IECC (the East Coast Main Line between Doncaster and Northallerton, the Transpennine lines between York and Morley and York and Pudsey [both via Leeds], and the Airedale and Wharfedale lines).
- Spring 2019 - lines controlled by the former Bowesfield signalbox on Teesside. This included the triangular junction at Stockton Cut and along the Tees Valley Line towards Darlington.
- Winter 2021 - the Durham Coast line from Stockton to Sunderland. Some former signal boxes were converted to house signalling or level crossing equipment, while Norton East signal box will remain as it is a listed structure.
- March 2021 - Sheffield to Shireoaks signalling system upgraded and passed to York with the demolition of Beighton Station Junction signal cabin.
- April 2021 - signalling control of the King's Cross power signal box (PSB) was transferred to York ROC at the end of April 2021
- November 2021 - signalling from around Middlesbrough railway station
- August 2023 - transfer of route handled by Peterborough power signal box. This involved 68 miles (109 km) between Biggleswade and Grantham.
- 2024 (projected) - implementation of ETCS between Fletton Junction (south of Peterborough railway station) and London King's Cross railway station (including the Hertford Loop).

== Gallery ==
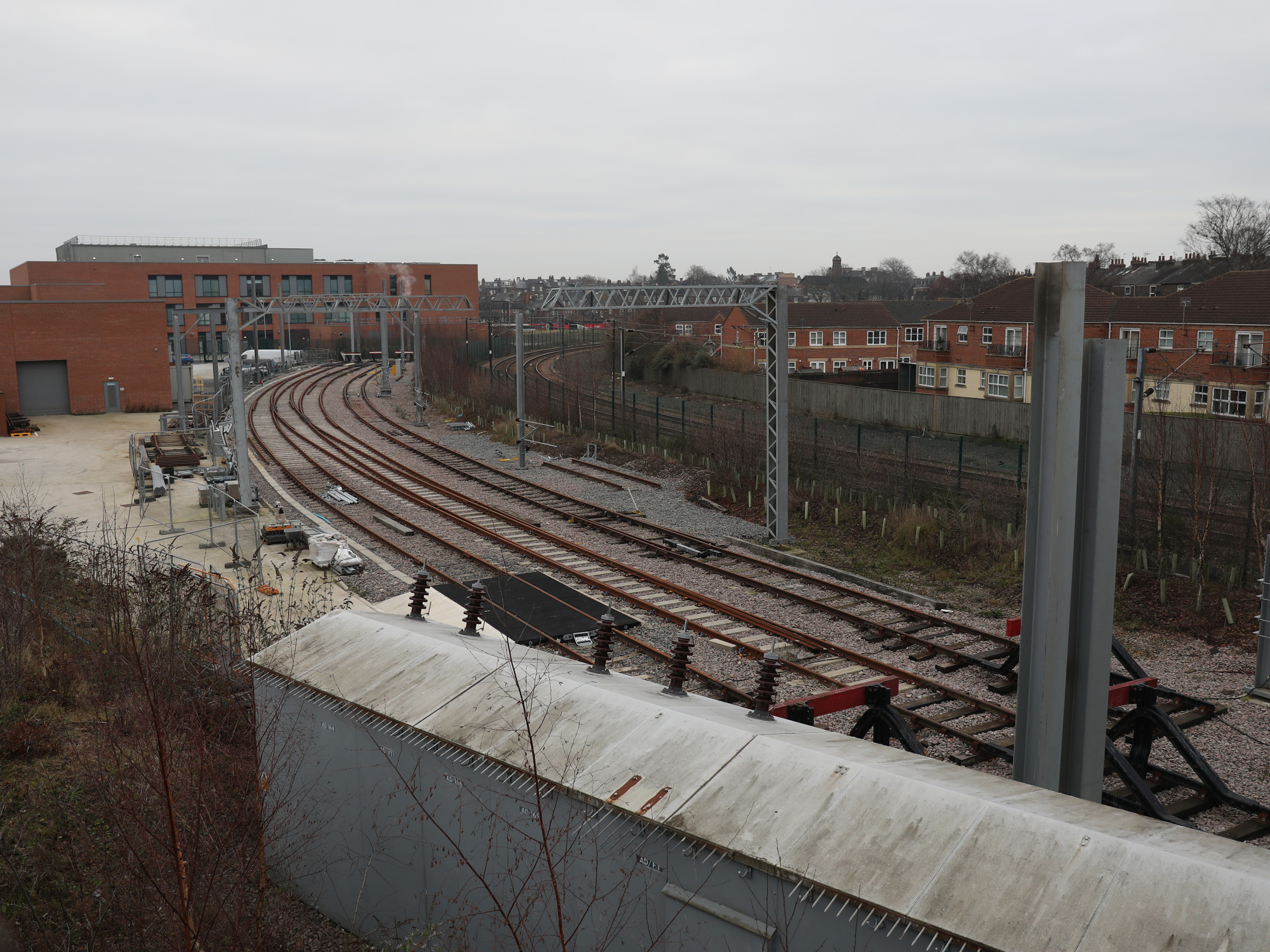
The external training railway lines at York ROC

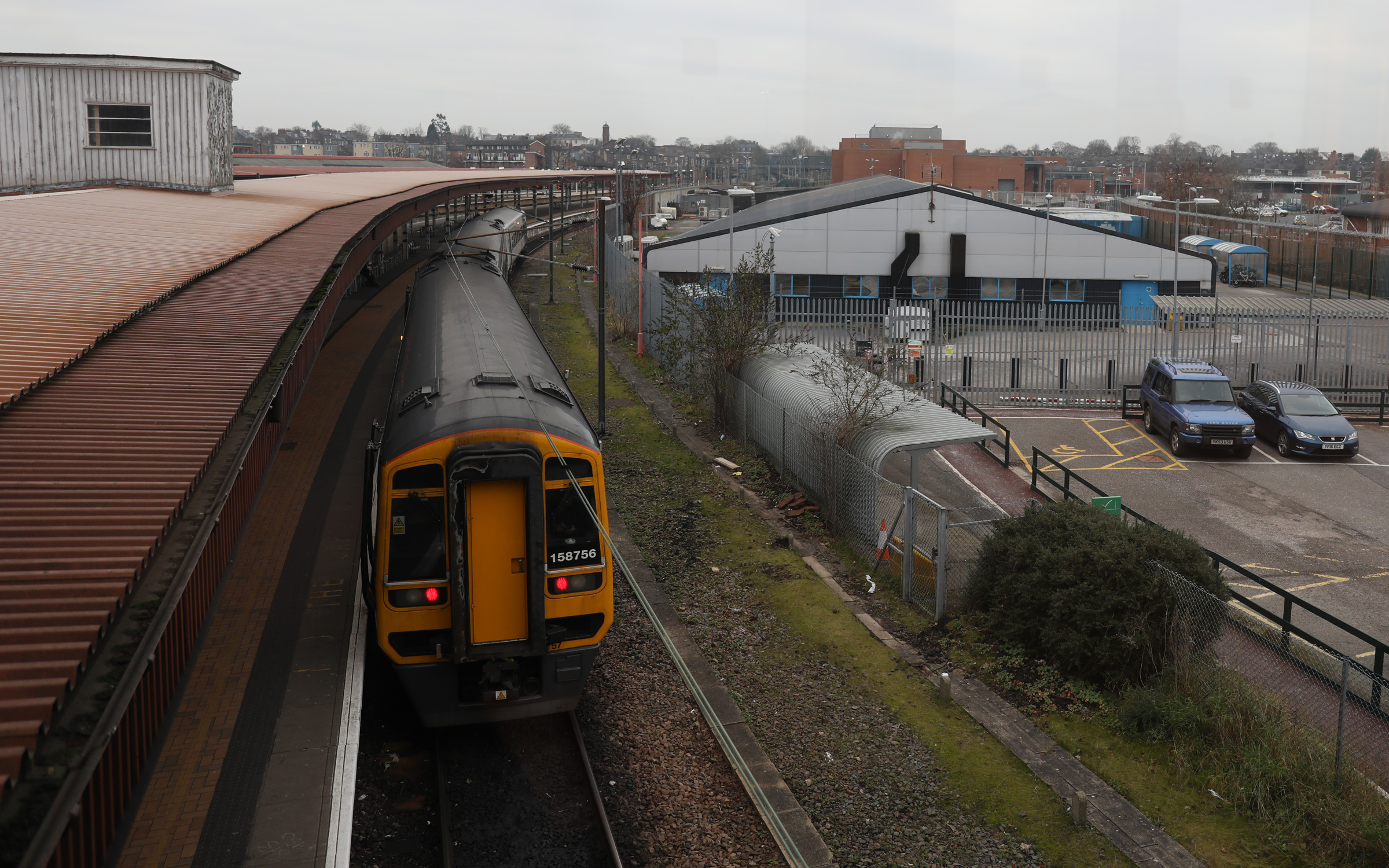
The IECC at York is the building with the blue doors to the right of the train. The ROC is the brick building further back

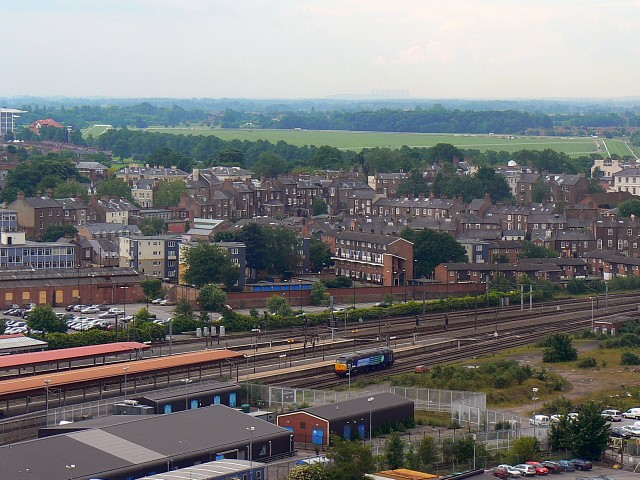
A view from The Yorkshire Wheel, National Rail Museum, York. The patch of rough ground adjacent to the locomotive is where the ROC now stands.

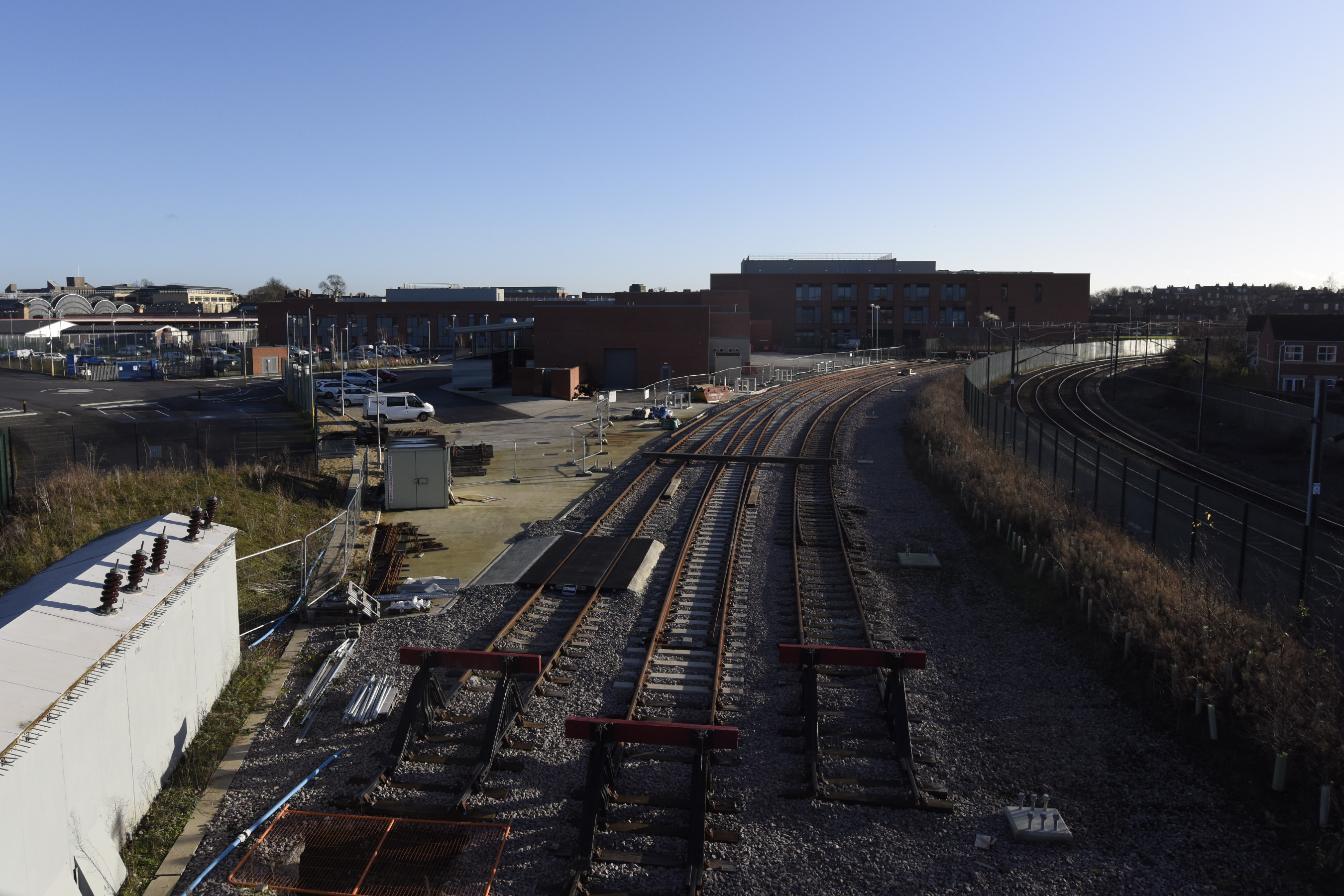
York ROC still being fitted out

== See also ==
- Rail operating centre
