= Station Road (York) =

Street in York, England

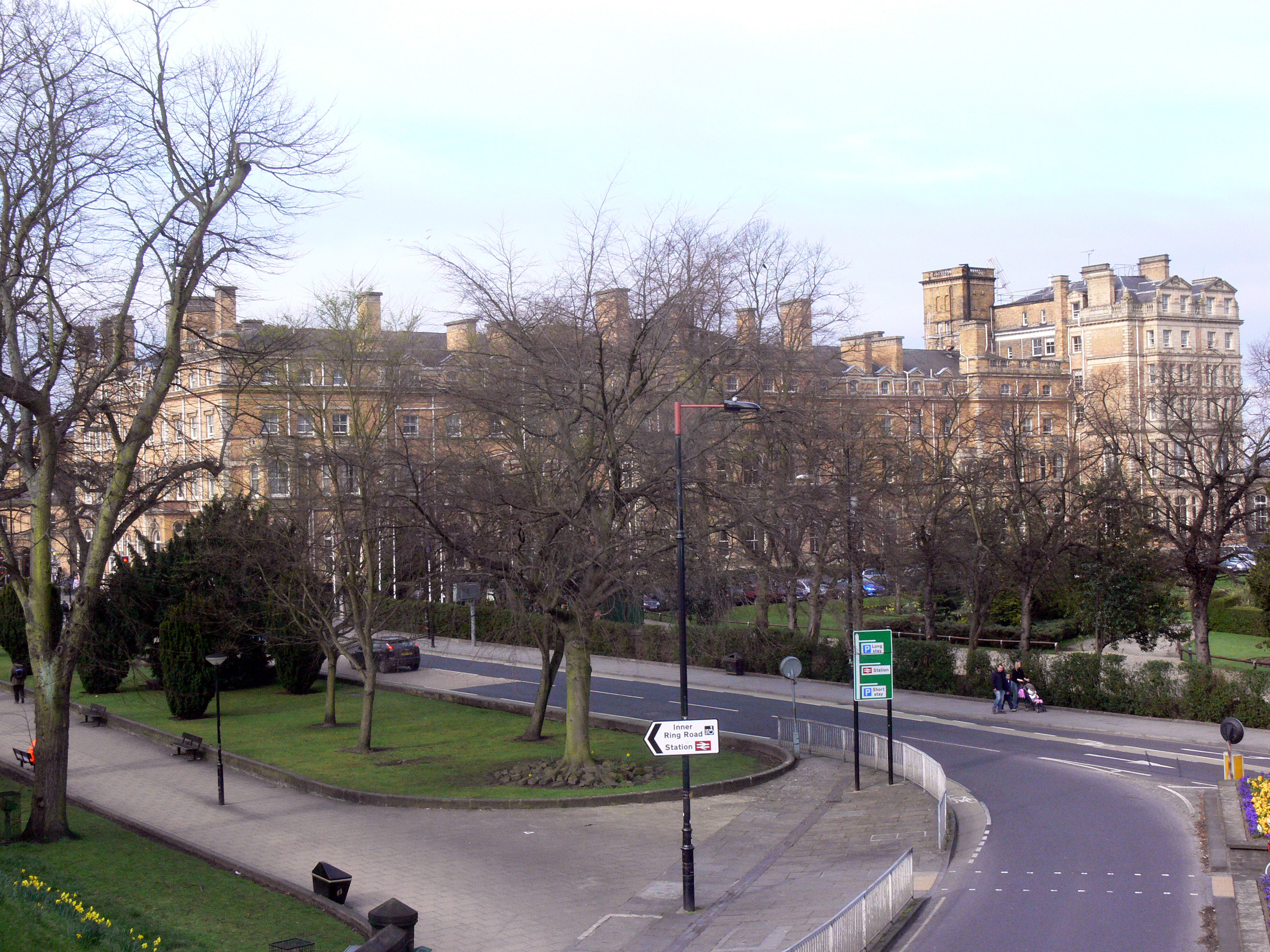
- View south-west on the street, towards the Royal York Hotel
- Location within York
- Former name: Thief Lane
- Location: York, England
- Coordinates: 53.9584°N 1.0913°W
- North east end: Lendal Bridge; Station Avenue; Rougier Street; Tanner's Moat
- South west end: Queen Street

Station Road is a street in the city centre of York, in England.

== History ==
The street lies immediately outside York city walls, leading to the south bank of the River Ouse. The area is likely to have seen some Roman and Anglian settlement, but later became partly a cemetery, with fields further out. In 1832, the city's cholera burial ground was established by the road. The street originated as part of Thief Lane, but following the construction of the new York railway station in 1877, the street was re-rerouted, and its southern part became Station Road.

== Layout and architecture ==
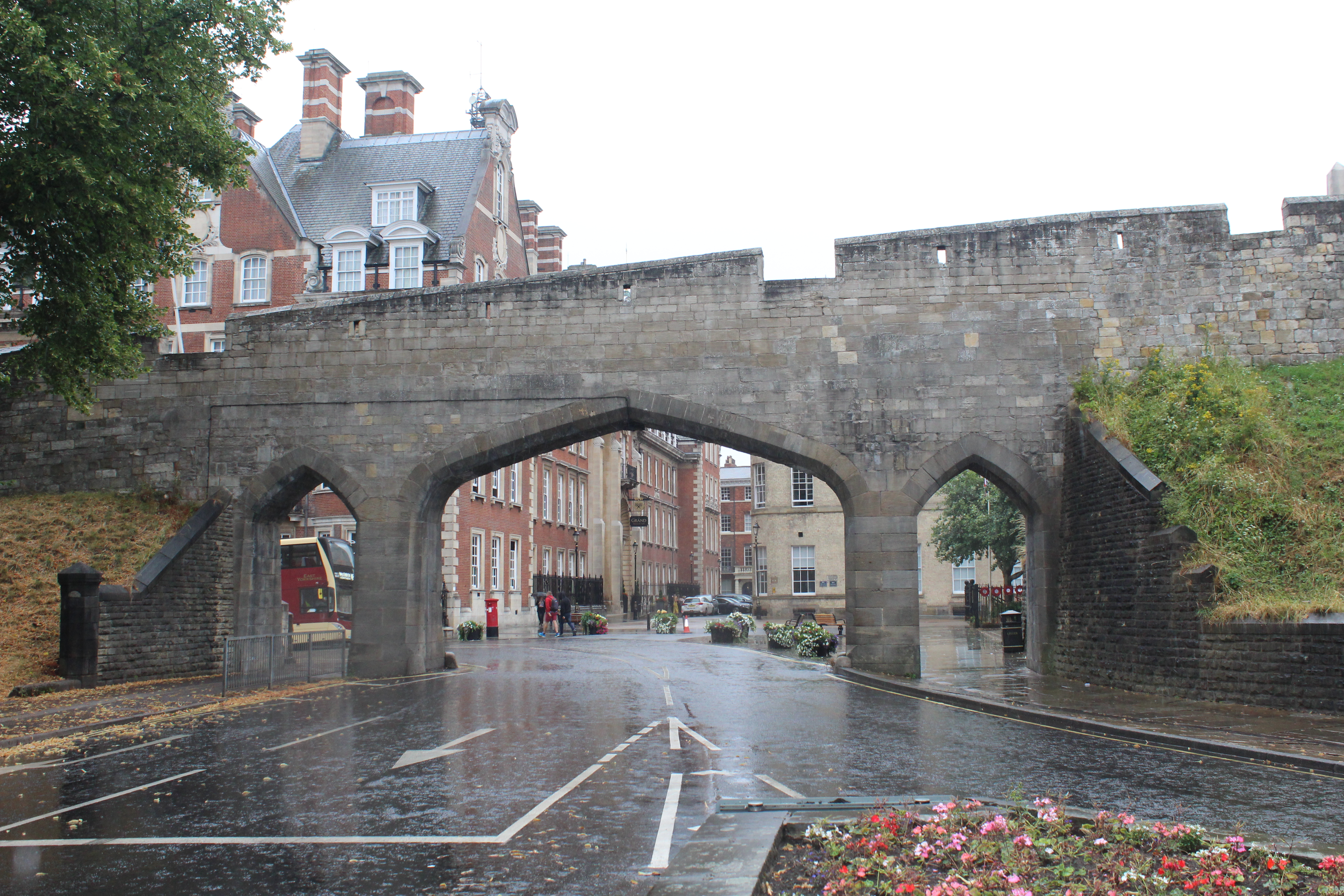
Station Road passing under the city wall

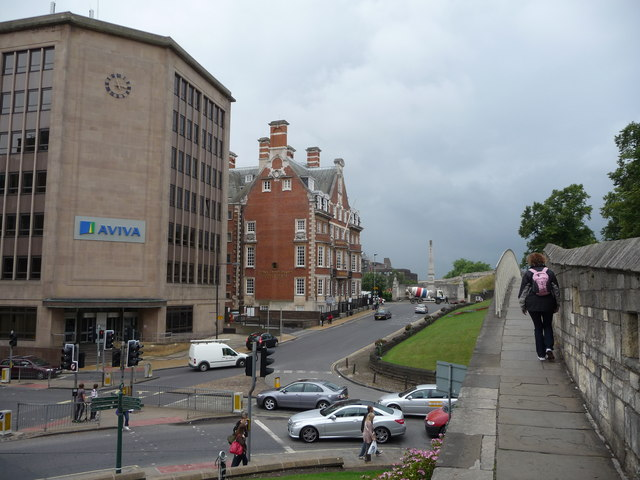
View south-west from Lendal Bridge towards the war memorial

The street runs north-east as a continuation of Queen Street, forming part of the city's inner ring road. At a crossroads with Station Rise and Station Avenue, it briefly turns south-east, under York city walls, then at another junction with Station Rise it turns north-east again. It terminates at a junction with Station Avenue, Rougier Street and Tanner's Moat, while its continuation is Lendal Bridge.

Listed buildings on the north-west side of the street include York railway station, The Principal York hotel, and a statue of George Leeman. The south-east side is mostly taken up by the city walls, along with the North Eastern Railway War Memorial, and the side of the Grand Hotel and Spa.
