= Rail operating centre =

Regional signalling centres on the mainland British railway network

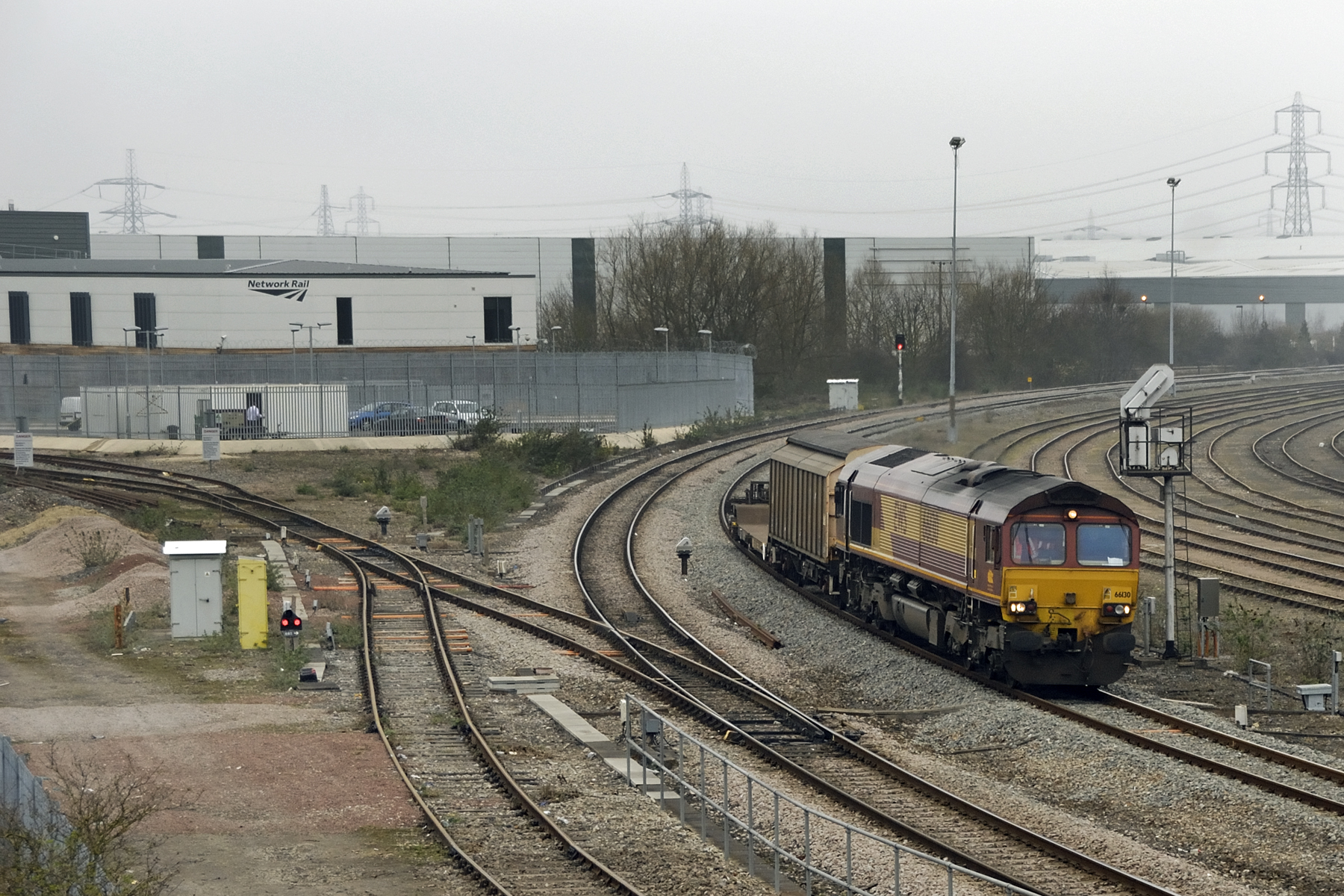
66130 is seen passing the TVSC/ROC at Didcot with an MoD service from Bicester. The ROC is the building on the left with the black Network Rail logo.

A rail operating centre (ROC) is a building that houses all signallers, signalling equipment, ancillaries and operators for a specific region or route on the United Kingdom's main rail network. The ROC supplants the work of several other signal boxes which have thus become redundant.

Network Rail announced the creation of fourteen ROCs situated throughout Great Britain that will control all railway signalling over the British National Rail network. This was subsequently revised to twelve ROCs with responsibilities at two (Saltley and Ashford) being transferred to other ROCs (Rugby and Gillingham respectively).

In November 2016, Network Rail announced that the ROC at Edinburgh would not go into operation with all its functions and responsibilities being transferred to Cowlairs in Glasgow.

Nationally this has meant the redundancy of 800 mechanical-lever signal boxes and around 200 panel and IECC boxes. Some are listed buildings and will be left in situ.

The ROCs are built under private contracts for Network Rail, and will only control the rail routes controlled by Network Rail. Railways in Northern Ireland, various heritage railways and other tramways are not subject to control by a ROC. Ashford IECC still controls the UK stretch of the Channel Tunnel Rail Link (HS1/CTRL), which is owned by London and Continental Railways and not Network Rail.

The ROCs function as signalling and control centres with signalling staff, train operating company (TOC) staff and Network Rail controllers all working under one roof. This is meant to enable quick solutions to signalling problems and fewer delays to trains and passengers. Network Rail envisage the twelve ROCs to be controlling the entire network by 2058.

== Signalling history ==
Originally, the early railways employed 'policemen' to time the intervals between trains and to give a 'stop' signal if a train had passed in the previous ten minutes. Developments led to many everyday workings (such as interlocking points) and signal boxes to house the levers that allowed signallers to change the points and signals over a given stretch of railway. These signalboxes were often elevated above the railway due to the locking mechanisms of the signals and points being accommodated on the lower storey. This also allowed the signaller to keep an eye on things from a good vantage point.

At the end of the Second World War, the United Kingdom network was host to over ten thousand mechanical-lever signalboxes. When British Rail was created from the Big Four private railway companies under the Transport Act 1947, they began to install power signal boxes (PSB) at strategic locations such as Euston, Crewe, Doncaster, Rugby and Carlisle. The PSBs would remove the necessity for many individual boxes along a particular route and would pass control to one centralized location. Carlisle's PSB took over the responsibility of 44 signal boxes alone in the north west area.

A step on from the PSBs was the IECC (Integrated Electronic Control Centre) system, a forerunner of the ROCs. The first IECC panel was installed at London Liverpool Street in 1989.

After the railways in Britain were privatised in 1994, (Note: This date refers to the privatization of the infrastructure under Railtrack. The train operating companies would not see final privatisation until 1997.) staff from the then operating company, Railtrack, paid a visit to the Union Pacific Operating Center, USA in 1999. After viewing the facilities and seeing the control they decided that a small number of major operating centres was the way forward for UK operations. Just one centre was approved and built in 2003 at Saltley, near to Birmingham, as part of the West Coast Route Modernisation. However this building was not connected for some time and whilst it was used by Network Rail staff, no signalling equipment was installed until 2006.

== European Rail Traffic Management System (ERTMS) ==
With the advent of the 'Digital Railway' project, signalling methods such as ERTMS have been adopted as a way forward by Network Rail. There are two components of ERTMS, ECTS (European Train Control System) and TMS (Traffic Management System).

Whereas lineside signals operated by a signaller would control train movements, ETCS will signal trains via a computer without lineside apparatus. In effect, the train creates its own 'buffer zone' through a digital signal transmitted from the cab. An onboard computer on the train will inform the driver of the 'allowable speed and movement of the train.' TMS allows delays to be minimised through a computer running algorithms and deciding how best to return traffic patterns to normal.

These systems mean the removal of traditional signalling infrastructure and the signal boxes that go with them.

== Antecedents ==
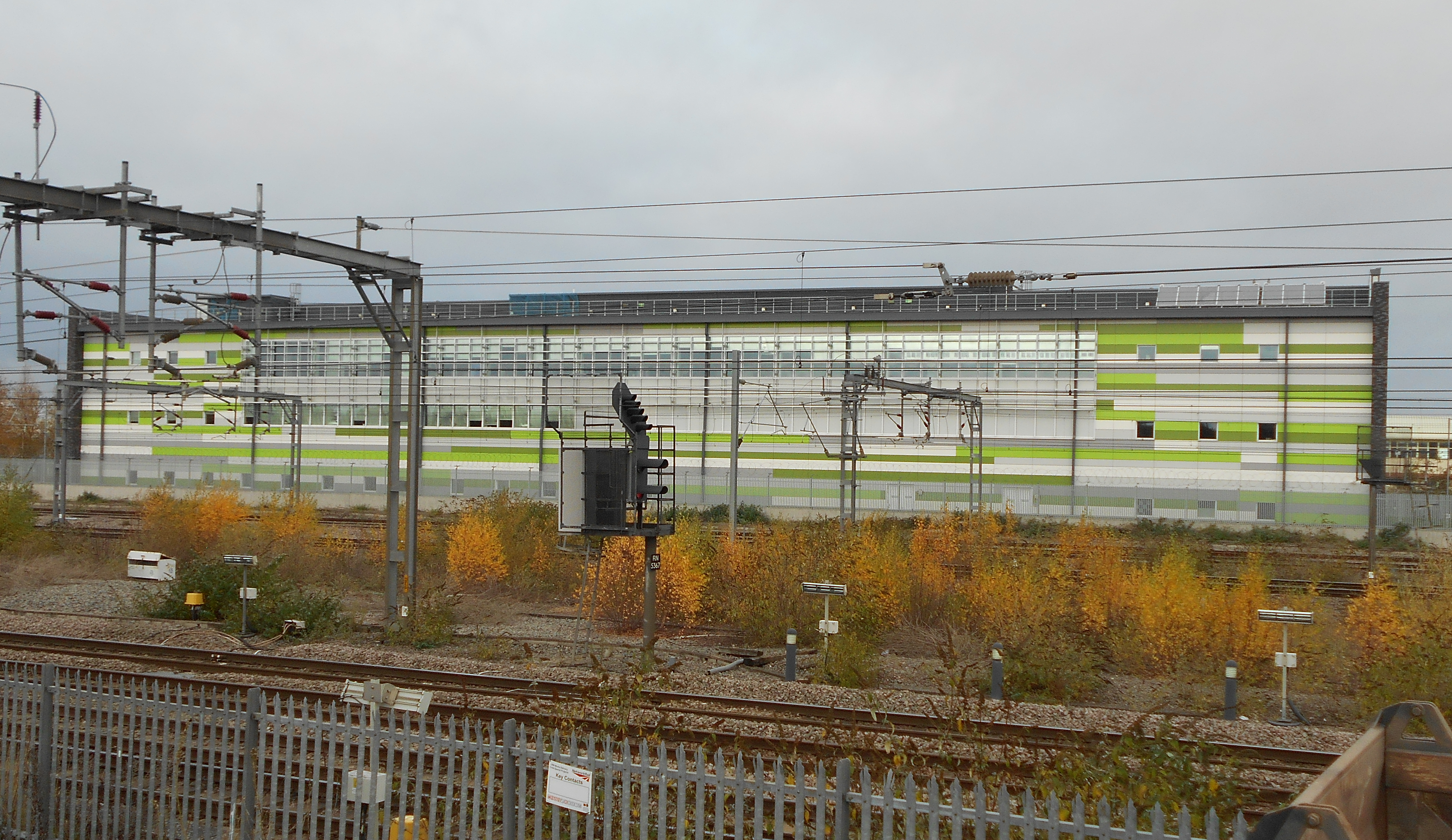
Rugby ROC, alongside the West Coast Main Line

York IECC (Integrated Electronic Control Centre) is an example of an early version of a ROC. York IECC was opened in 1989 and controlled a large region in Yorkshire bounded by Gargrave, South Emsall, Selby, Northallerton, Cottingley (Leeds), Bramley and the Harrogate loop. The ROC, which opened in York on 12 September 2014, superseded the York IECC in January 2015 and will eventually control the East Coast Main Line and associated lines in Lincolnshire, Yorkshire and the Humber and the North East of England. This means a King's Cross to Edinburgh train will be signalled by York ROC all the way from King's Cross to the Scottish Borders.

Saltley ROC will become a remote signalling centre of Rugby. The facility at Saltley was opened as a bomb-proof signalling centre for the West Coast Route Modernisation. However, the inability to achieve a workable Traffic Management System (TMS) without lineside signalling, meant an increased budget of £1.4 billion and the building became a white elephant. The structure was slowly integrated into a ROC function with signalling upgrades transferring responsibility to Saltley starting in 2006. Because the interlocking mechanisms are in place, they will be left at Saltley and operated remotely from the Rugby ROC. What Saltley cannot do, that Rugby can, is host the human space needed for the signallers and train operating company (TOC) staff to work together.

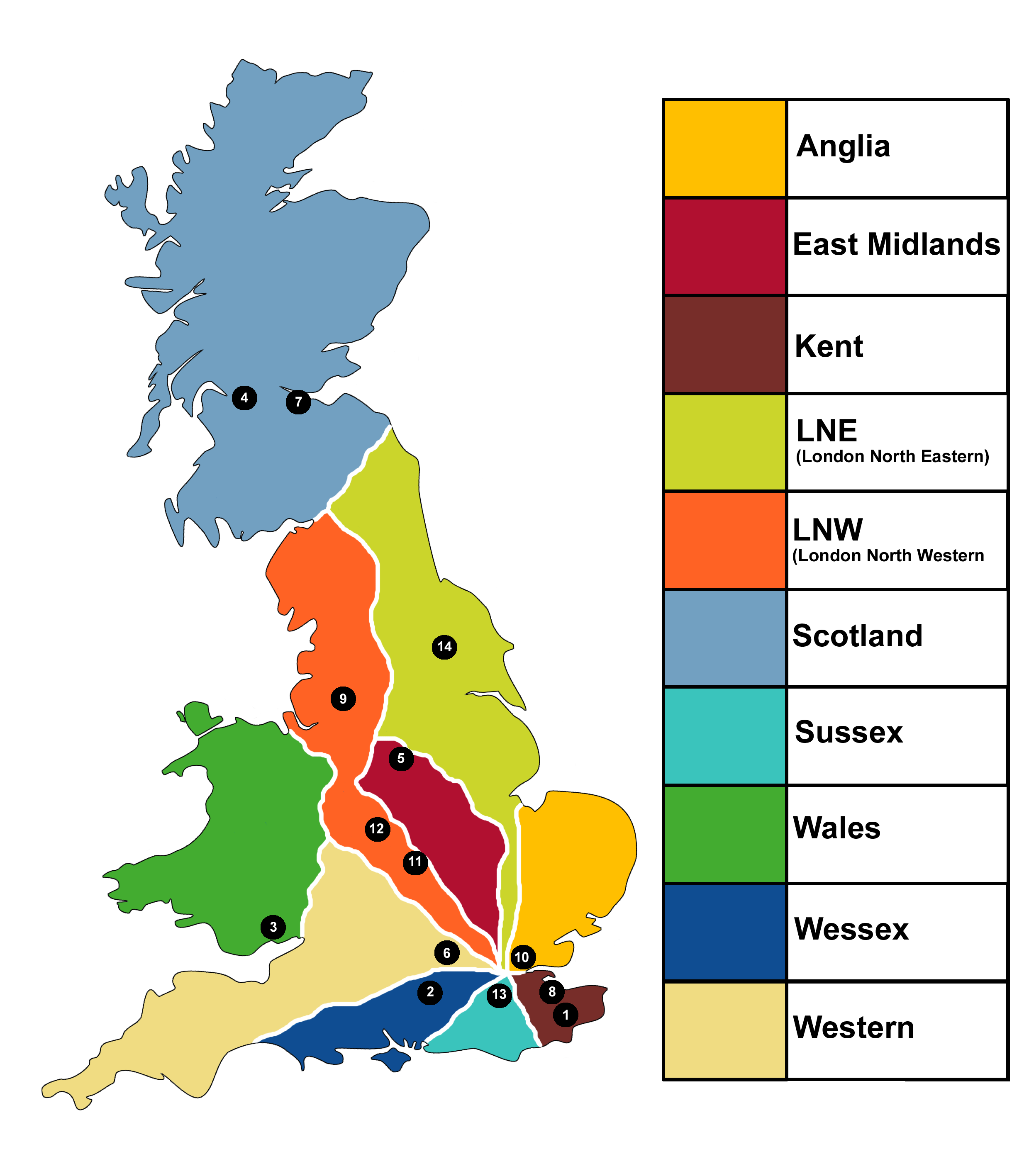
Network Rail route map with rail operating centres (ROCs) annotated. This is representational only and is not to scale.

== ROC locations ==
No	Region	Name	Date opened	Route	Notes
1		Ashford	1993	Kent	Responsibility for control of Ashford IECC will be divided between Three Bridges and Gillingham.
2		Basingstoke	April 2016 (Note: This is a projected opening date and so the actual date of opening may vary.)	Wessex	Basingstoke Station (BE), Dorset Coast (PW) and the West of England Line (SE) are signalled from Basingstoke ASC.
3		Cardiff	24 October 2010	Wales	Wales Rail Operating Centre, known as WROC
4		Cowlairs	December 2008	Scotland (West)	Originally the West of Scotland Signalling Centre (WSSC)
5		Derby	3 April 2008	East Midlands	Was formerly known as the EMCC (East Midlands Control Centre)
6		Didcot	March 2010	Western	Also known as the Thames Valley Signalling Centre (TVSC)
~~7~~		~~Edinburgh~~	1976	Scotland (East)	Originally opened as a PSB, then transferred to IECC in 2006. In updated notices released in November 2016, it was stated that there will now be only one ROC in Scotland at Cowlairs in Glasgow. All functions will be transferred there when necessary.
~~8~~		Gillingham	1994.	Kent	Opened in 1994 as the East Kent Signalling Centre
9		Manchester	21 July 2014	LNW (North)	Will control all lines in the north west in addition to West Coast Main Line from Crewe to Carlisle.
10		Romford	November 2016 (Note: Romford was supposed to open in November 2015. The delay in opening has been unspecified.)	East Anglia	Most other anglia signalling functions are controlled from the Service Delivery Centre at Liverpool St and from PSBs at Colchester and Cambridge.
11		Rugby	13 November 2015	LNW (South)	
12		Saltley	13 March 2003	LNW (South)	First ROC Opened in 2003. (Note: Originally opened as the West Coast Route Modernisation Control Centre (WCRMCC), then as the Network Management Centre, then as IECC and finally moved to ROC.) Functions will be transferred to Rugby ROC by 2019.
13		Three Bridges	7 January 2014	Sussex	
14		York	12 September 2014	LNE	Projected last signal box transfer on the network will be to York, in 2056, when Morpeth box closes.

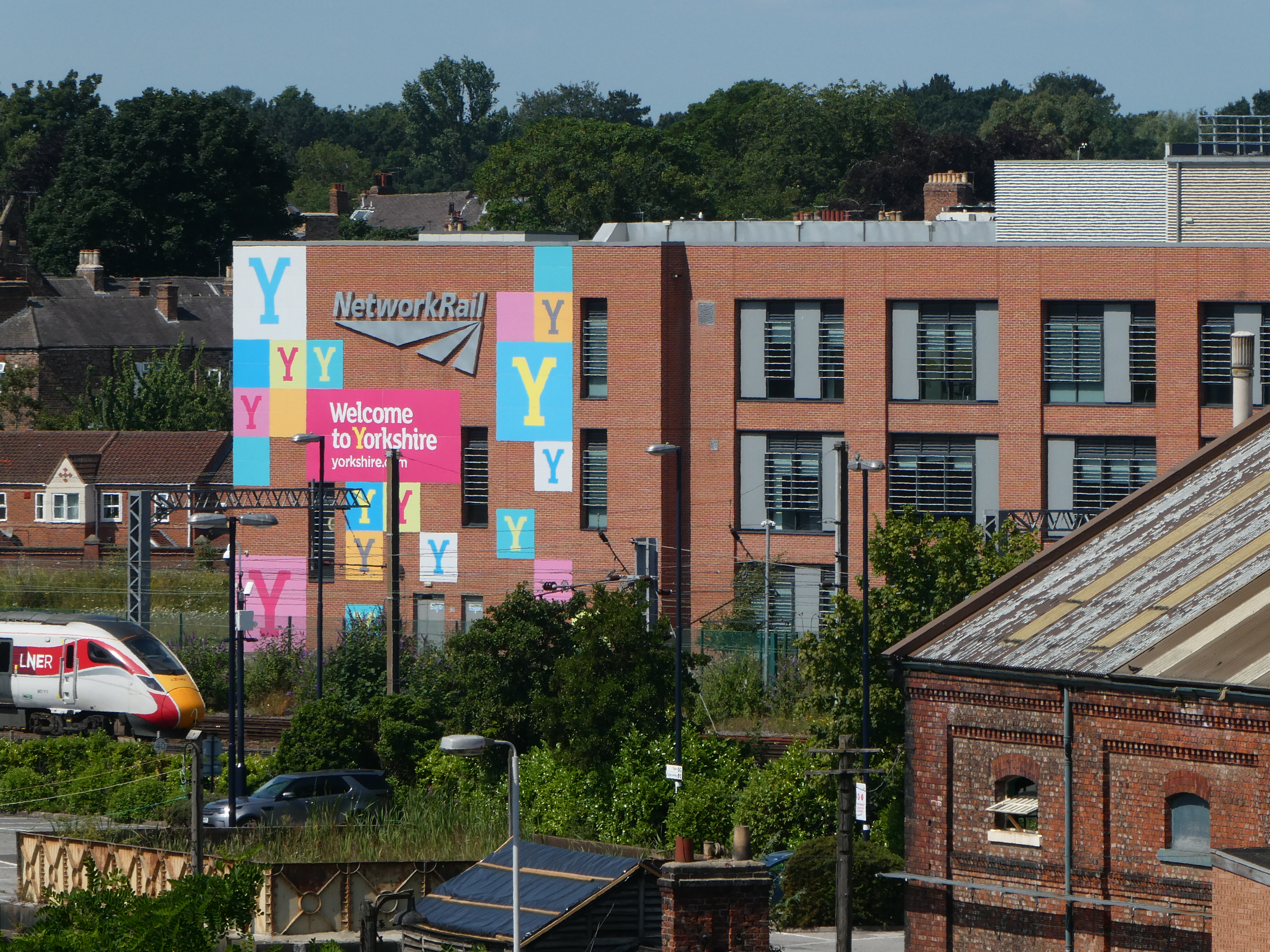
The York Rail Operating Centre

In 2011, Network Rail forecast that 40% of the then remaining 845 signal boxes would be closed by 2017. Progress on this has been slower than anticipated and, by the end of 2017, 137 signal boxes that were due to close were still open.

== Benefits of the ROCs ==
Whilst the drive for the ROCs has been one of signalling upgrades, there are other benefits and detractions to the scheme. Around four thousand staff will lose their jobs over the course of the implementation programme leaving two thousand signallers in the ROCs. The benefits of centralised control will be that the train operating company (TOC) staff will work alongside the Network Rail staff to allow cohesive problem solving such as resolving late running and last-minute platform changes. Network Rail have said that "The ROC is a key part of our strategy to improve reliability whilst driving down the cost of running and maintaining the railway."

== Hacking and safety ==
In 2016, it came to light that Network Rail had been hacked four times up to July 2016. As most of the rail network in the United Kingdom is analogue, it would not affect anything, but Network Rail had an aspiration for the digital rail Traffic Management System to go live in 2018. An online security company, who were not commissioned by, or working for Network Rail, discovered the hacks and declared that whilst the hacks were "probing and not disruptive," they could well be full of malicious software in the future.

Network Rail responded by saying that

"Britain has the safest major railway in Europe... safety is our top priority, which is why we work closely with government, the security services, our partners and suppliers in the rail industry and security specialists to combat cyber threats."

In 2017, Ian Prosser, the chief inspector of railways informed the Transport Select Committee that not enough had been done to alleviate the possibility of the ROCs becoming a single point of failure. Prosser highlighted higher workload on signallers and the contingencies needed in the event of a natural disaster disabling one of the ROCs.

In August 2026, a power cut at the ROC near Manchester caused many trains to be cancelled and many others to be delayed.

== Acronym confusion ==
ROCs are mostly referred to as rail operating centres. Even in Network Rail's own documentation they are sometimes referred to as railway operating centres. Some of the railway press have referred to them as route operating centres (Note: Whilst this is a direct quote from an interview, the interviewer does not make use of a [sic] modifier to correct this error.) and even regional operating centre.

This issue is further clouded by Network Rail having another ROC, the Railway Operational Code and the signalling industry in the United Kingdom having a remote override control.
