= The Milner York =

Listed hotel in York, England

- The hotel in 2018
- Interactive map of the The Milner York area

General information
- Type: Station hotel
- Location: Station Road, York, England
- Coordinates: 53°57′33″N 1°05′29″W
- Year built: 1878–1896
- Client: North East Railway Company

Design and construction
- Architects: William Peachey and Thomas Prosser
- Designations

Listed Building – Grade II
- Official name: Royal York Hotel and area railings attached at side and rear
- Designated: 24 June 1983
- Reference no.: 1256559

The Milner York is a historic Grade II listed station hotel on Station Road, adjacent to York railway station in England. Built of yellow Scarborough brick, it is a five-storey building completed in 1878, a year after the present station opened.

== History ==
=== First Royal Station Hotel – 1853 ===
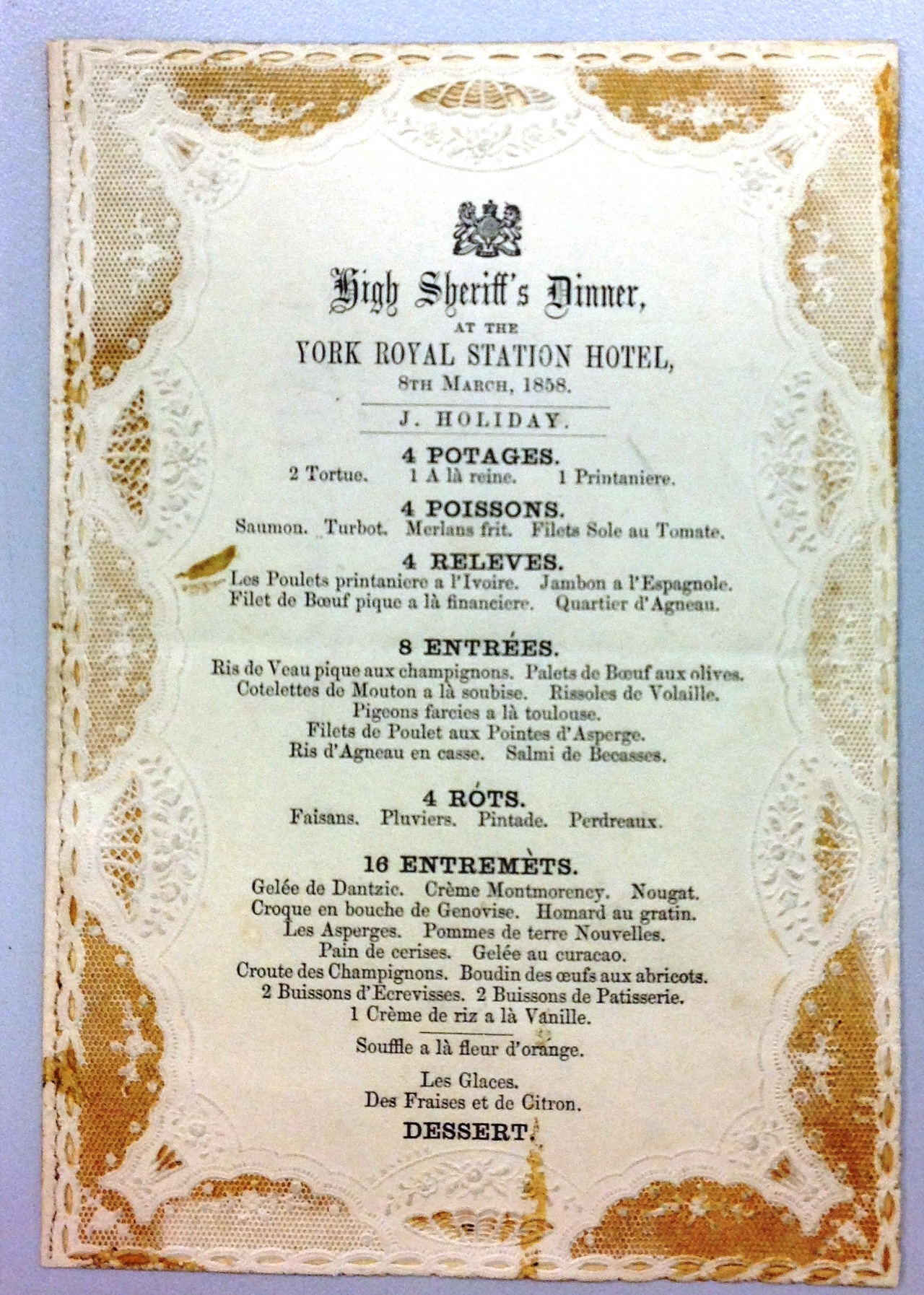
A menu from 1858 held by the National Railway Museum, York.

The Station Hotel opened on 22 February 1853 as an addition to York old railway station, and was designed by the architect G. T. Andrews. Queen Victoria visited the hotel the following year, in 1854, and it was renamed the Royal Station Hotel as a result. The original hotel became redundant after the opening of the new station in June 1877 and was converted into offices.

=== Second Royal Station Hotel – 1878 ===
==== Early years ====
The second Royal Station Hotel opened on 20 May 1878. Designed by William Peachey of the North Eastern Railway, and built to complement the wider station complex planned by the company's architect Thomas Prosser, the hotel formed an integral part of the new station. As the railway's flagship hotel, it was managed directly by the company. It featured elegant, high-ceilinged banqueting rooms and 100 large bedrooms costing 14 shillings a night. The building contractors were Lucas Brothers.

A 27-room west wing was added in 1896, nicknamed the "Klondyke" after the Klondike Gold Rush.

In 1923, ownership and management of the hotel transferred to the London and North Eastern Railway (LNER).

==== British Transport Hotels ====
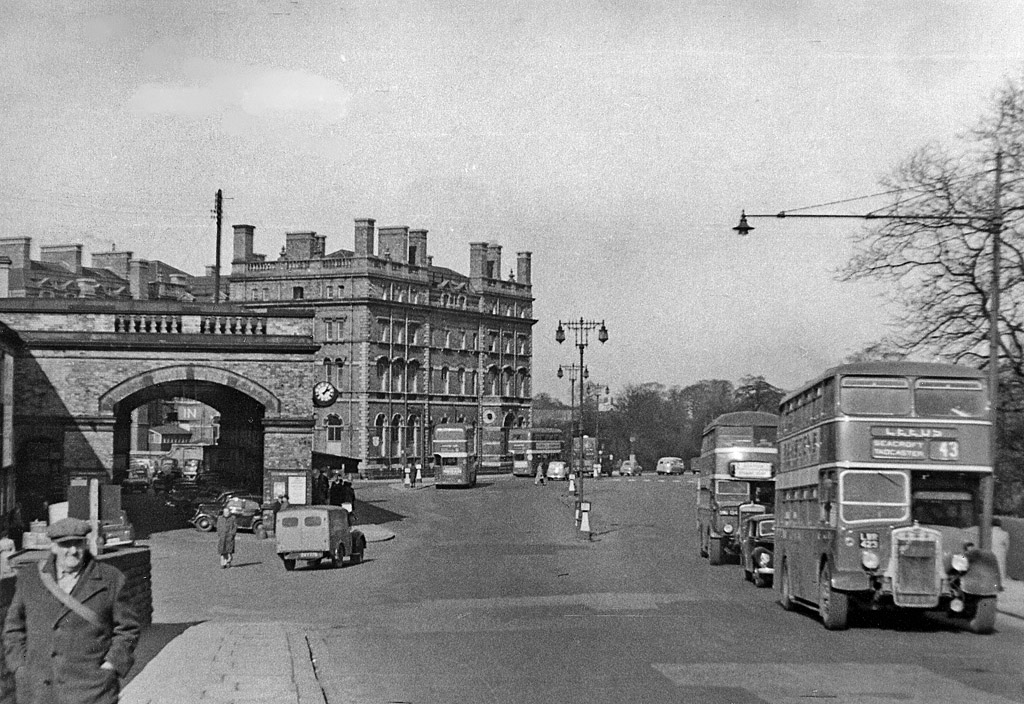
The station and hotel in 1955

In 1948, Britain's railways were nationalised, and with them York's railway hotel. Initially, it formed part of the "Hotels Executive" of the British Transport Commission. The British Transport Hotels brand was introduced in 1953.

In 1981, an annexe to the hotel, known as the Friars Garden Hotel, was opened in a building that formerly served as the North Eastern Railway's catering department. This was the final investment under nationalised ownership. A typical turnover at the time was £1,225,000 in 1981. The same source recorded 135 bedrooms in the main hotel and 23 in Friar's Garden, with 24 rooms not yet en-suite. The Ebor Restaurant had 52 covers; by 2013, this space was operating as The Tempus Restaurant.

==== Privatisation ====
Under Margaret Thatcher's government, ancillary activities of the railways were privatised, including British Transport Hotels. The sale was conducted by public tender, and the sale inventory dated October 1982 is held by the National Railway Museum in York. In 1983, the hotel was sold to Batchshire Limited, a subsidiary of Sea Containers, and renamed The Royal York Hotel. The building was Grade II listed the same year.

==== 2006–present ====
In 2006, the Principal Hayley Group sold The Royal York Hotel, along with five other hotels, to Active Asset Investment Management for £275 million, under a deal that allowed Principal Hayley to continue managing the hotels for 25 years. Principal Hayley repurchased the six hotels in 2012 for £200 million, £75 million less than the price at which they had been sold. The following year, in 2013, the Principal Hayley Group was sold to Starwood Capital. The hotel was renovated and renamed The Principal York on 1 November 2016.

Starwood Capital sold Principal Hayley to Fonciere des Regions in 2018, and the new owners contracted with IHG Hotels & Resorts to manage the properties. In October 2022, Glasgow-based RBH Management took over operations of the hotel.

In March 2024, RBH announced their intention to rename the hotel The Milner York, for local war hero William Milner, the Second World War-era foreman of York station, killed on 29 April 1942 during German air raids known as the Baedeker Blitz, while attempting to retrieve first aid supplies in the station. The hotel was re-launched as The Milner York on 16 October 2024. Milner's 95-year-old daughter Brenda cut the ribbon at the hotel's official reopening ceremony.

== See also ==
- Listed buildings in York (outside the city walls, southern part)
