= York IECC =

Former railway signalling centre in Yorkshire, England

Coordinates: 53°57′27.6″N 1°05′42.0″W

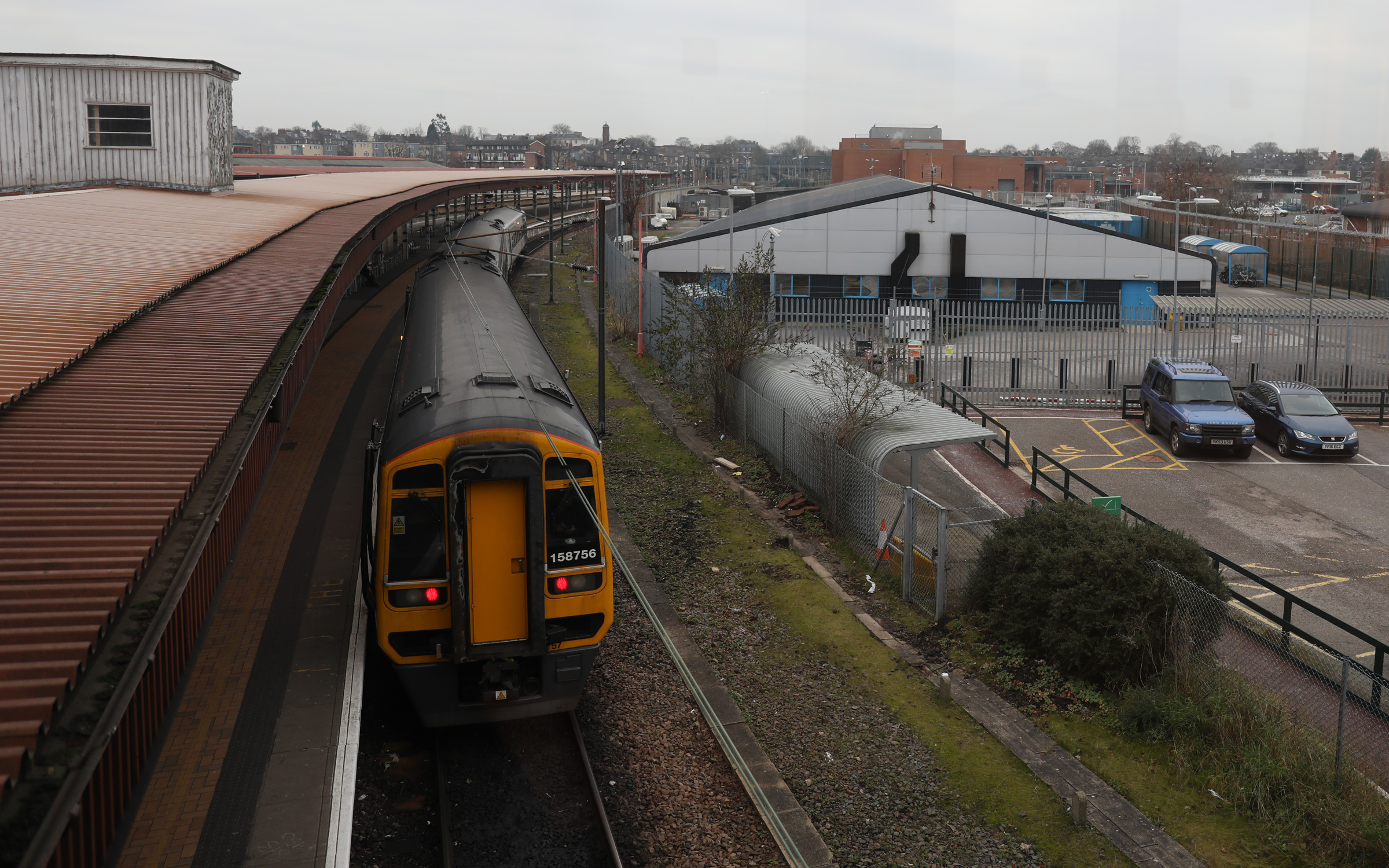
The IECC at York with the ROC behind it

York Integrated Electronic Control Centre was a major signalling control centre on the East Coast Main Line (ECML) railway between London and Edinburgh. The centre also contained the Electrical Control Room (ECR) for the ECML, and adjoining branches as well as the LNE regional control office of Network Rail. Its responsibility for signalling across Yorkshire was transferred to York Rail Operating Centre in December 2018.

== History ==
The centre originally opened in May 1989, first replacing local boxes in the area, including the 1951 York power box.

The 1951 box was at the time one of the largest route-relay interlockings in the world, its relay room 46 metres long by 10 metres wide, containing nearly 3,000 relays. It replaced seven mechanical boxes containing a total of 868 levers – the largest of which was Locomotive Yard, the largest mechanical signal box in the UK.

York IECC also replaced the LNER power boxes at Northallerton, Thirsk (dating from 1933) Tollerton and Skelton Junction

When the first stage of York IECC was completed in April 1990, its control area boundaries were Church Fenton, Low Gates, just south of Great Heck to just south of Darlington on the ECML.

In the early 2000s, the IECC was further extended to take in the 1960s Leeds PSB area, Church Fenton and the newly electrified lines to Skipton. It was at this time that the Electrical Control Room (ECR) was added to York IECC which centralised control from the ECML's previous ECRs at Doncaster and Hornsey. The electrical control area also included the Midland Main Lane (MML) which remained with York ECR throughout its transfer to York ROC until 2023 when the MML was controlled by a new ECR at Derby ROC.

The control area was further extended in 2011 with the closure of Moorthorpe and Hickleton signal boxes.

== Control area ==
At the time of closure, the York Integrated Electronic Control Centre had seven workstations: York North, York South, Leeds West, Leeds North-West, Leeds East, Leeds East Assist and Leeds Ardsley. The workstations were supplied with automatic route setting (ARS) to assist with the signallers' workload.

The overall control area was Danby Wiske on the ECML to north of Shaftholme Junction and from Gargrave (north of Skipton)/Bradford Forster Square/Ilkley/New Pudsey/Woodlesford/Cottingley/Bolton on Dearne/South Elmsall/Horsforth through Leeds station to York (via Church Fenton).

Leeds station handles around 1,000 train services per day, and York around 420.

The centre drove a number of solid-state interlockings (SSI) and older route-relay interlockings (RRI), for example some of the relay rooms provided for the 1983 Selby Diversion, which was controlled from a separate mosaic panel inside the old 1951 box before the area was controlled by the IECC. There was also a Westlock interlocking controlling the Moorthorpe/Hickleton area.

== Other ==
Part of the centre's overview screens are displayed in the National Railway Museum at York.

The final update to York IECC was at Christmas 2011, when there were changes to the track layout at the south end of the York station to improve the capacity of the station by providing an additional approach track from Holgate Junction. The updates required to the IECC and the SSI interlockings were undertaken by DeltaRail.

By the end of 2016, signalling controlled by York IECC was due be transferred to the Rail Operating Centre located adjacent to the IECC building. However, most of this was delayed until the Christmas period over 2018/2019 and the IECC will then be decommissioned. The transfer was completed between 24 and 27 December 2018 The IECC building may also be demolished to make way for more platforms in York station.
