= York railway station =

Principal railway station in North Yorkshire, England

York
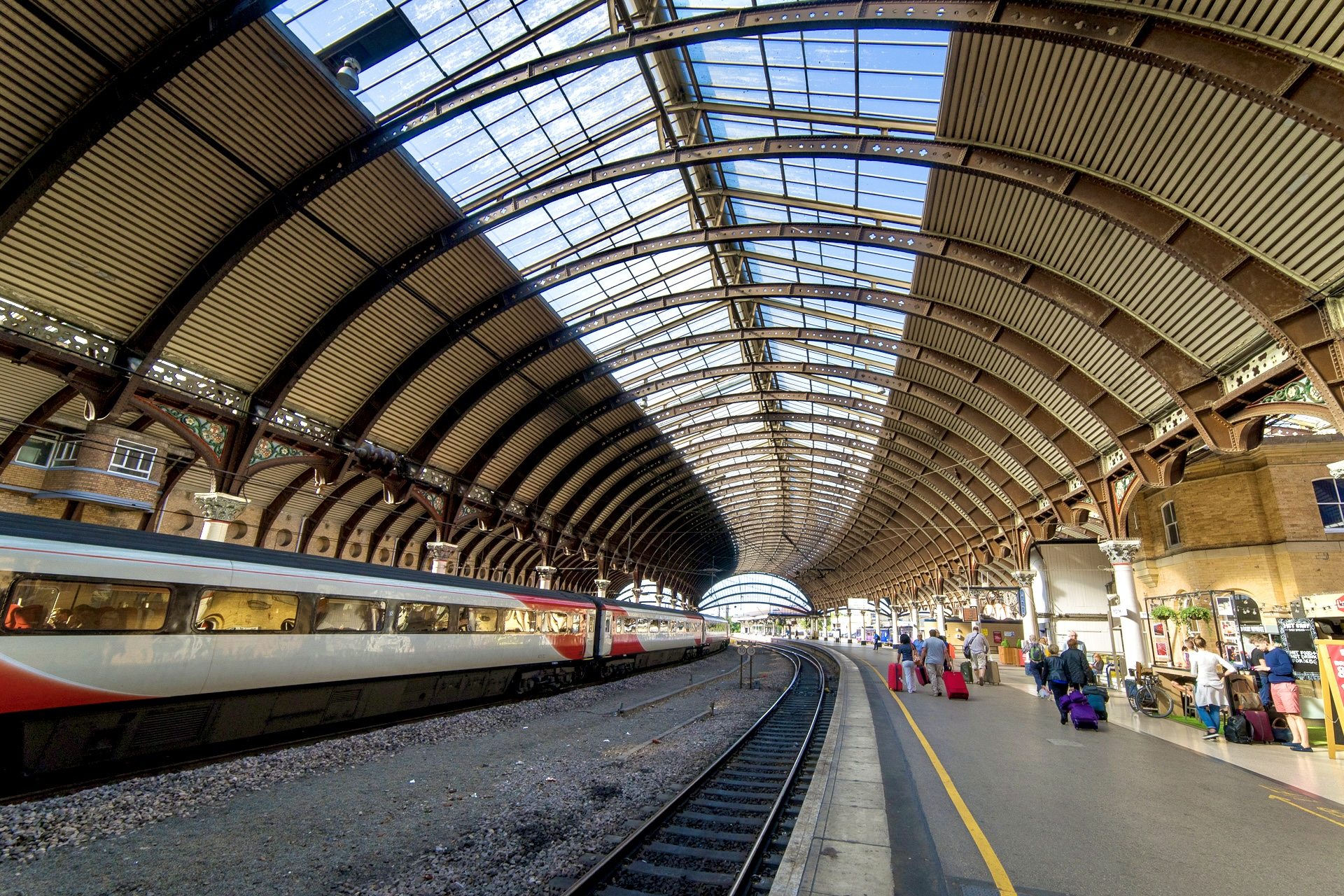
- Overall roof in 2016

General information
- Location: York, City of York, England
- Coordinates: 53.9583°N 1.0930°W
- Grid reference: SE596517
- Owner: Network Rail
- Manager: London North Eastern Railway
- Platforms: 11

Other information
- Station code: YRK
- Classification: DfT category A

Key dates
- 25 June 1877: Opened
- 1909: Extended

Passengers
- 2020/21: ▼1.836 million
- Interchange: ▼0.116 million
- 2021/22: ▲8.092 million
- Interchange: ▲0.495 million
- 2022/23: ▲8.863 million
- Interchange: ▲0.930 million
- 2023/24: ▲9.185 million
- Interchange: ▲1.276 million
- 2024/25: ▲10.464 million
- Interchange: ▼1.248 million

Listed Building – Grade II*
- Feature: York railway station
- Designated: 1 July 1968
- Reference no.: 1256554
Location
Notes
- Passenger statistics from the Office of Rail and Road

York railway station is a principal stop on the East Coast Main Line (ECML) serving the cathedral city of York, in North Yorkshire, England. It is 188 miles 40 chains (303.4 km) north of London King's Cross and, on the main line, it is situated between Doncaster to the south and Thirsk to the north. As of June 2018, the station is operated by London North Eastern Railway (LNER). It is the busiest station in North Yorkshire, the third busiest in Yorkshire & the Humber and the sixth busiest in Northern England, as well as being the busiest intermediate station on the ECML. In Britain's 100 Best Railway Stations by Simon Jenkins, the station was one of only ten to be awarded five stars.

The present York station was built during the 1870s after it had become clear that the old station, which could not facilitate through traffic due to its positioning, was a hindrance to long distance express services along what is now referred to as the ECML. Designed by the North Eastern Railway architects Thomas Prosser and William Peachey and built by Lucas Brothers, the station was built to be expansive and well-furnished from the onset, complete with a distinctive curved train shed. Upon its opening on 25 June 1877, it was the largest railway station in the world, possessing 13 platforms along with various amenities, including a dedicated hotel (now The Milner York). Various additional facilities, from lengthened platforms to additional passenger facilities such as tea sheds, would be built subsequently.

The station took extensive damage from German bombers during the Second World War, resulting in both deaths and injuries amongst the staff. Repairs to the station were completed in 1947. Journey times between York and other destinations along the ECML were slashed following the introduction of Class 55 Deltic locomotives and InterCity 125 high speed trains. During the late 1980s, extensive changes were made to the signalling and track layout through and around the station as a part of the wider electrification of the ECML. These works facilitated the use of electric traction, such as the InterCity 225, at York station for the first time. Further improvements to the station have continued following the privatisation of British Rail, including new control facilities, additional retail units, redesigned approaches and track layout changes.

York station is a key junction approximately halfway between London King's Cross and Edinburgh Waverley. It is approximately five miles (eight kilometres) north of the point where the Cross Country and trans-Pennine routes via Leeds join the main line, connecting Scotland and the North East, North West, Midlands and Southern England. The junction was historically a major site for rolling stock manufacture, maintenance and repair.

== History ==
=== Background and construction ===
The first York railway station was a temporary wooden building on Queen Street outside the walls of the city, opened in 1839 by the York and North Midland Railway (Y&NMR). It was succeeded in 1841, inside the walls, by what is now York old railway station. On 31 July 1854, the Y&NMR merged with the Leeds Northern Railway and the York, Newcastle and Berwick Railway to form the North Eastern Railway (NER); shortly thereafter, it became clear that the company's desire to run through trains between London and Newcastle without needing to reverse out of the old York station to continue their journey would necessitate change, specifically the construction of a new through station outside the city walls. Furthermore, as the NER's dominance of rail traffic in the region expanded through further mergers, several directors desired an expansive and elaborate facility to serve York, where the company was headquartered. During 1866, Parliament authorised the construction of this new railway station.

This new station was designed by the North Eastern Railway architects Thomas Prosser and William Peachey and built by Lucas Brothers. A prominent feature was the large curved train shed, which had been viewed as one of the more impressive monuments of the railway age. This train shed was supported by a combination of wrought-iron trusses and cast-iron columns. The majority of the station was built of yellow Scarborough brick with moulded ashlar plinths and dressings. The site selected for the station had been formerly used as agricultural land, although a Roman-era cemetery was located there as well.

Construction of the present station took place between 1871 and 1877. Opened on 25 June 1877, it had 13 platforms and, at that time, was the largest railway station in the world. As part of the new station project, the Royal Station Hotel (now The Principal York), designed by Peachey, opened in 1878. The original ticket hall and concourse were both located on the eastern side of the station.

=== Alterations ===
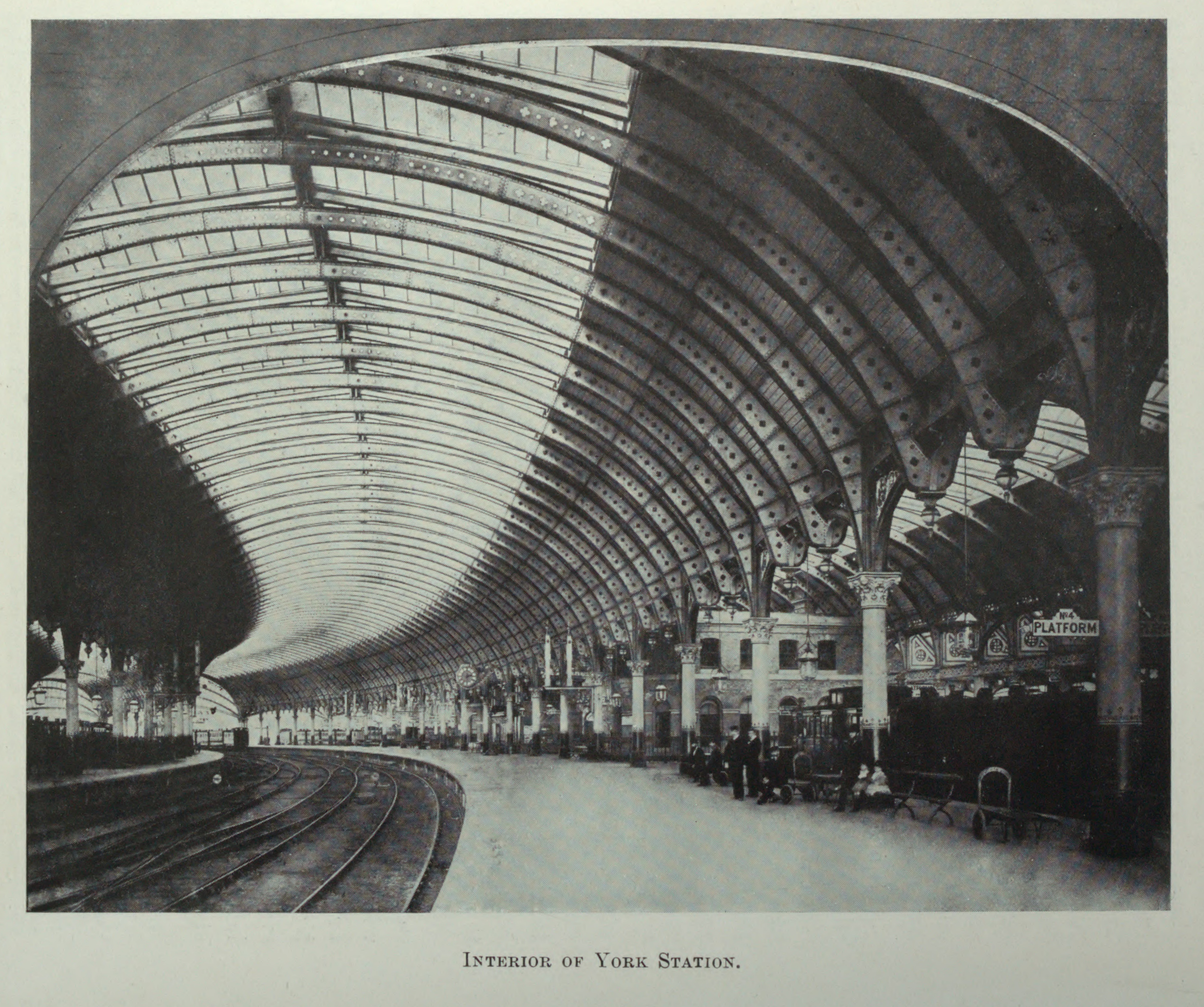
Interior, 1915

Between 1900 and 1909, several of the original platforms were extended both northwards and southwards while an additional western platform was added; a new signal box, tea room and book shop were also opened. Between 1938 and 1939, the western platform was refurbished, the current footbridge was built, and the station was resignalled.

The station was heavily bombed during the Second World War. On one occasion, on 29 April 1942, 800 passengers had to be evacuated from a King's Cross-Edinburgh train which arrived during a bombing raid. On the same night, two railway workers were killed, one being station foreman William Milner, who died after returning to his burning office to collect his first aid kit; he was posthumously awarded the King's Commendation for Brave Conduct. A plaque in his memory has been erected at the station. The station was extensively repaired in 1947.

During 1951, a new signal box was opened. The station was designated as a Grade II* listed building in 1968. An extensive refurbishment was undertaken in 1977. Journey times between York and other destinations along the ECML were slashed following the introduction of the British Rail Class 55 locomotive in 1961 and the Intercity 125 high speed train during 1978.

The track layout through and around the station was remodelled again in 1988 as part of the resignalling scheme that was carried out prior to the electrification of the ECML shortly afterwards by British Rail. This resulted in several bay platforms (mainly on the eastern side) being taken out of service and the track to them removed. Consequently, the number of platforms was reduced from 15 to 11. In May 1989, a new signalling centre (York IECC) was commissioned on the western side of the station to control the new layout and also take over the function of several other signal boxes on the main line. The IECC supervised the main line from Temple Hirst (near Doncaster) through to Northallerton, along with sections of the various routes branching from it. It had also taken over responsibility for the control area of the former power box at Leeds and thus, the signalling for trains as far away as Gargrave and Morley.

Plaforms and overall roof, 2026

Between 2006 and 2007, the approaches to the station were reorganised to improve facilities for bus, taxi and car users as well as pedestrians and cyclists. The former motive power depot and goods station now house the National Railway Museum. The station was renovated during 2009; these works included the reconstruction of Platform 9 and the implementation of extensive lighting alterations. New automated ticket gates were planned, but the City of York Council wished to avoid spoiling the historic nature of the station. The then operator National Express East Coast planned to appeal this decision, but the plans were scrapped altogether upon the franchise's handover to East Coast. During the late 2000s and early 2010s, the track and signalling systems on the southern side of the station were renewed. In early 2011, an additional line and a new junction were completed, which eliminated one of the biggest bottlenecks on the ECML.

Further improvements to the station have been made under LNER's stewardship, including a new lounge for first class passengers, additional retail units, and new public toilets.

=== Accidents and incidents ===
- On 31 March 1920, a passenger train was derailed as it entered platform 8.
- On 5 August 1958, a passenger train crashed into the buffers at platform 12.
- On 18 January 2006, a freight train wagon derailed on points entering platform 3 before re-railing 400 sleepers later causing extensive damage to trackworks through the station. The derailment happened due to faulty suspension on one of the bogies causing the load to sit unevenly across the axles, lifting the axle off the tracks as it went round the corner over the points.

== Layout ==
Main station entrance and bus stops, viewed from the city walls

All the platforms except 9, 10 and 11 are under the large, curved, glass and iron roof. They are accessed via a long footbridge, which also connects to the National Railway Museum, or via lifts and either of two pedestrian tunnels. Between April 1984 and 2011, the old tea rooms housed the Rail Riders World/York Model Railway exhibition.

=== Platforms ===
Platform 3 with a London North Eastern Railway Azuma train

The platforms at York have been renumbered several times, the most recent being in the late 1980s to coincide with a reduction in the number of platforms from 15 to 11. The current use is:

- Platform 1: South-facing bay platform mostly used for services to Hull and Bridlington or Sheffield via Moorthorpe and for stabling empty stock.
- Platform 2: North-facing bay platform connected only to the Scarborough branch, used mostly for stabling a spare TransPennine Express unit along with the accompanying station siding.
- Platform 3: Main southbound platform, but is signalled bi-directionally, accessible directly from the station concourse. Fast and semi-fast southbound London North Eastern Railway for London King's Cross generally use this platform. CrossCountry services, Grand Central and some westbound TransPennine Express services also use it. Southbound Lumo services go through platform 3 without stopping in York, northbound Lumo services use the avoidant track west of the station.
- Platform 4: Northward continuation of platform 3 connected only to the Scarborough branch, used by TransPennine Express services from Scarborough.

Platform 6 with a TransPennine Express train

- Platform 5 (split into 5a and 5b): It is the main northbound platform, but is signalled bi-directionally. Fast northbound London North Eastern Railway services to Scotland use this and generally call at Darlington and Newcastle only. It is also used by some CrossCountry services northbound and north-eastbound TransPennine Express to Scarborough generally use this platform. Southbound London North Eastern Railway services also stop here both fast and semi-fast, the latter of which generally call at Doncaster, Newark, Peterborough and London King's Cross.
- Platform 6: South-facing bay platform used mostly by Northern Trains commuter services to Leeds and Blackpool North; and by terminating London North Eastern Railway services that return south to London King's Cross.
- Platform 7: South-facing bay platform used mostly by Northern commuter services and London North Eastern Railway services to/from London Kings Cross.
- Platform 8: North-facing bay platform used almost exclusively by Northern Trains on the Harrogate Line.
- Platforms 9, 10, 11: Bi-directional platforms used by semi-fast and some fast London North Eastern Railway services heading north to Newcastle and Scotland, CrossCountry services north and southbound via Leeds, TransPennine Express services westbound to Manchester Piccadilly, Manchester Airport; Liverpool Lime Street and northbound to Newcastle and Redcar. Some Northern Trains services to Blackpool North and Leeds also use this platform.

Platforms 10 and 11 are outside of the main body of the station. Another siding, the former fruit dock, exists opposite platform 11.

== Recent developments ==
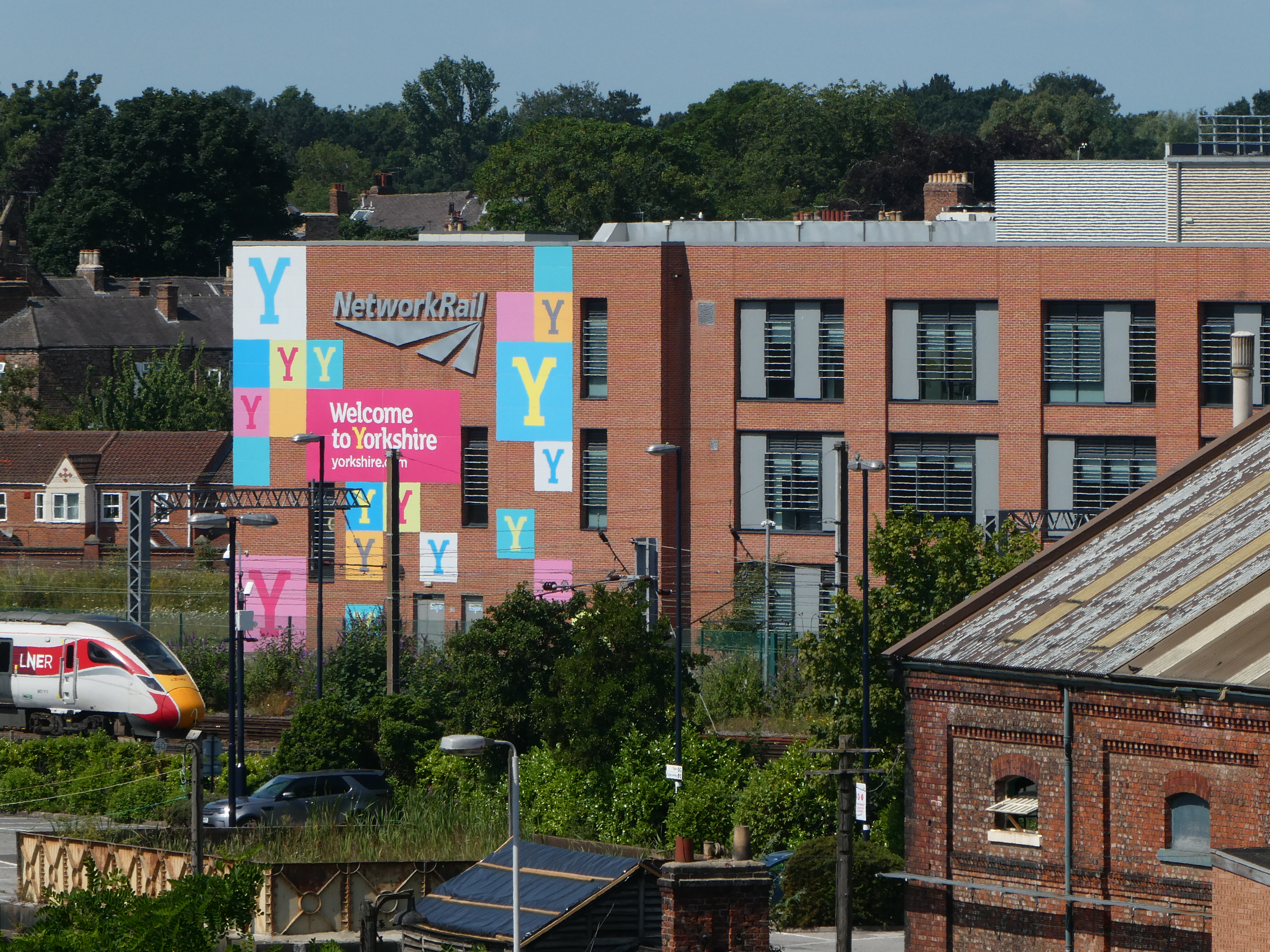
The York Rail Operating Centre

Just to the west of the station is one of Network Rail's modern Rail Operation Centres (ROC), which was opened in September 2014. This ROC took over the functions of the former IECC in December 2018 and will eventually control the majority of the ECML from London to the Scottish border and various subsidiary routes across the North East, Lincolnshire and South, North and West Yorkshire.

During Christmas 2020, major track replacement occurred, with Network Rail releasing time lapse footage of the works.

In 2022, work began to redevelop the area outside the station. In 2023, a further £10.5 million was confirmed for this massive revamp of the area at the front of York railway station. Queen Street Bridge, built to cross the lines into the old York station within the city walls, was demolished in 2024.

== York Central ==
Located adjacent to the station, York Central is one of the largest city centre brownfield regeneration sites in the UK. The 45-hectare (110-acre) site has been designated as a UK Government ‘Housing Zone’ and has also been awarded ‘Enterprise Zone’ status, which offers commercial occupiers significant incentives. Outline planning approval was given for the site in March 2019. It is anticipated that development of the full site could take between 15 and 20 years to complete.

== Services ==
York is served by five train operating companies:

=== London North Eastern Railway ===
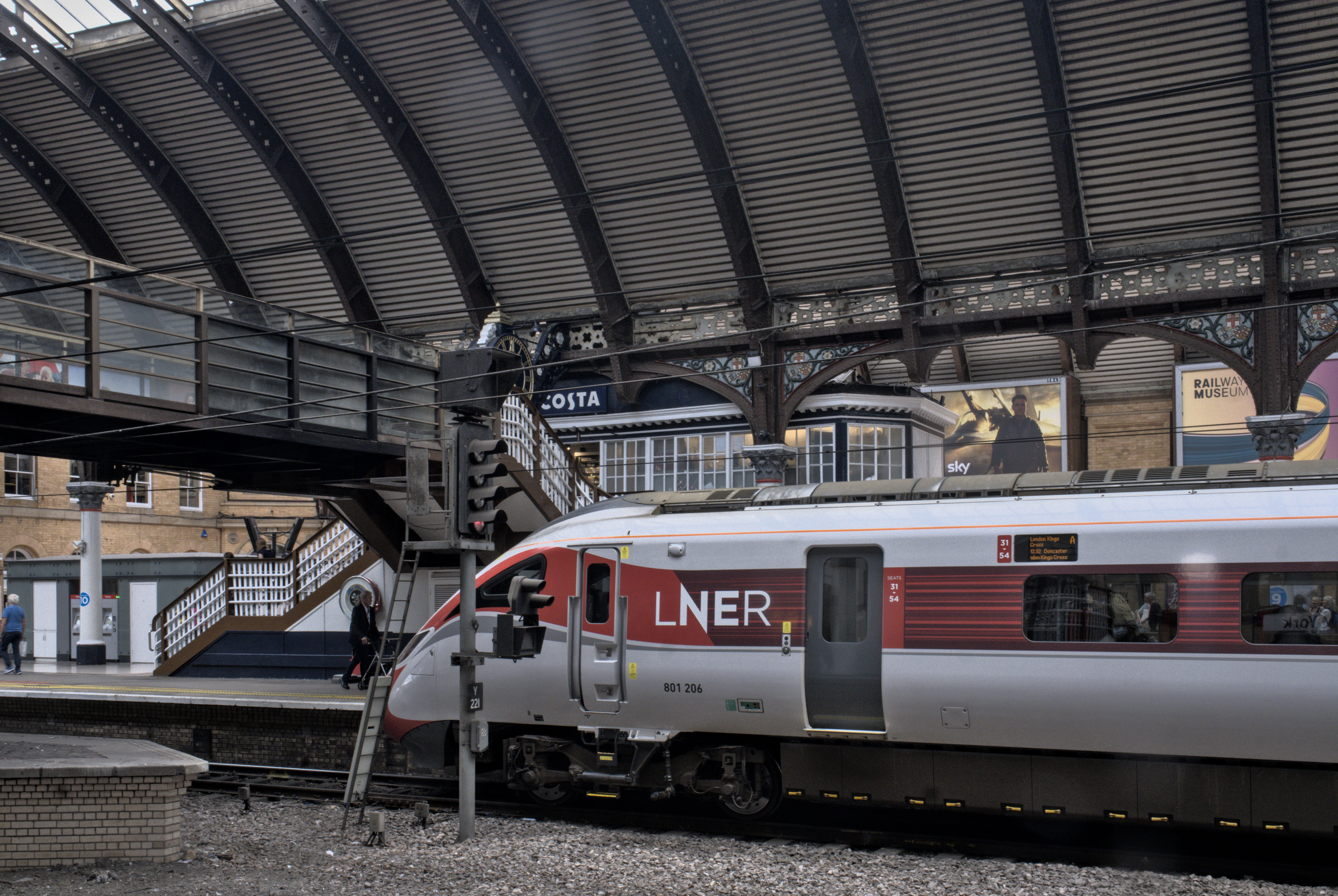
LNER Azuma at York in 2022.

London North Eastern Railway operates regular services that stop at York between London, Newcastle and Edinburgh. In addition, there are occasional services to Aberdeen and one train a day to Inverness. One train per day serves Middlesbrough. The fastest southbound services run non-stop to London, completing the 188-mile (303 km) journey in 1 hour and 47 minutes.

=== CrossCountry ===
CrossCountry provides a number of inter-city services that run across the country, primarily between Plymouth and Edinburgh Waverley via Bristol Temple Meads, Birmingham New Street and Leeds. Certain services extend to reach Penzance southbound, and others extend to reach Glasgow Central and Aberdeen northbound. Additionally there are a limited number of services between Reading and Newcastle, via Banbury, Birmingham New Street and Doncaster.

=== TransPennine Express ===
TransPennine Express provides various express services across the north of England to Manchester Piccadilly, Manchester Airport, Liverpool Lime Street, Newcastle, Scarborough and Saltburn via Middlesbrough.

=== Grand Central ===
Grand Central runs an open access service between Sunderland and London.

=== Northern Trains ===
Northern Trains operates a mostly hourly service towards Hull via Selby and Blackpool North, with a half-hourly service towards Leeds on both routes (via Garforth and via Harrogate) serving most stations en-route (plus three per day to Sheffield via Pontefract Baghill).

=== Former services ===
Until May 2021, East Midlands Railway provided one weekend return journey between York and London St Pancras via the Midland Main Line.

Preceding station	National Rail	Following station
Leeds	CrossCountry Cross Country Route	Darlington
Doncaster	CrossCountry Cross Country Route	Darlington
Garforth	TransPennine Express North TransPennine	Thirsk
Garforth	TransPennine Express North TransPennine	Northallerton
Leeds	TransPennine Express North TransPennine	Malton
Leeds	TransPennine Express North TransPennine	Terminus
Peterborough or London King's Cross	Grand Central; London-Sunderland	Thirsk
Doncaster or Peterborough	London North Eastern Railway; London-Newcastle/Edinburgh	Northallerton
Doncaster or Retford or Peterborough	London North Eastern Railway; London-York	Terminus
London King's Cross or Doncaster or Peterborough	London North Eastern Railway; London-Newcastle/Edinburgh/Scotland express services	Darlington
Leeds	London North Eastern Railway; Leeds-Aberdeen	Darlington
Ulleskelf	Northern Trains Dearne Valley Line	Terminus
Poppleton	Northern Trains Harrogate Line	Terminus
Selby	Northern Trains Hull-York Line	Terminus
Ulleskelf	Northern Trains Hull-York Line	Terminus
Ulleskelf	Northern Trains Micklefield Line	Terminus
	Future services	
Leeds	TBA; Northern Powerhouse Rail	Darlington
Sheffield	TBA; Northern Powerhouse Rail	Darlington
East Midlands Hub	TBA; Northern Powerhouse Rail	Darlington
	Historical railways	
Terminus	Y&NMR; York to Scarborough Line	Haxby; Station closed; Line open
	Disused railways	
Terminus	NER; York to Beverley Line	Earswick
Naburn	NER; East Coast Main Line	Beningbrough

== See also ==
- Grade II* listed buildings in the City of York
- Listed buildings in York (outside the city walls, southern part)
