= Welton, East Riding of Yorkshire =

Village and civil parish in the East Riding of Yorkshire, England

Coordinates: 53.733343°N 0.545157°W

Welton
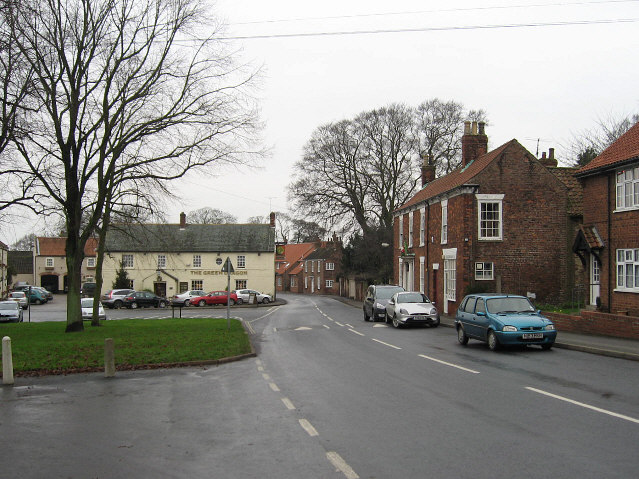
- Welton Green

- Location within the East Riding of Yorkshire
- Population: 2,176 (2011 census)
- OS grid reference: SE960273
- Civil parish: Welton
- Unitary authority: East Riding of Yorkshire
- Ceremonial county: East Riding of Yorkshire
- Region: Yorkshire and the Humber
- Country: England
- Sovereign state: United Kingdom
- Post town: BROUGH
- Postcode district: HU15
- Dialling code: 01482
- Police: Humberside
- Fire: Humberside
- Ambulance: Yorkshire
- UK Parliament: Goole and Pocklington

Welton (or Welton with Melton) is a village and civil parish in the East Riding of Yorkshire, England. The parish extends to the bank of the Humber Estuary at its southern extreme, and into the Yorkshire Wolds in the northern part. The A63 road and Hull to Selby railway line both bisect the parish east–west, south of Melton and Welton.

The civil parish is formed by the villages of Welton and Melton and the hamlet of Wauldby. According to the 2011 census, Welton parish had a population of 2,176, an increase on the 2001 UK census figure of 1,560. Welton village is situated approximately 1 mile (1.6 km) north-east of the town of Brough on the north side of the A63 road to Kingston upon Hull. It is on the Yorkshire Wolds Way National Trail, a long distance footpath.

Major landmarks in the parish include Welton Waters, a former clay pit, and home of Welton Waters Adventure Centre and Welton Sailing Club; Melton Bottom Quarry, a chalk quarry in Melton; and the Melton West and Melton Park industrial estates. The exposed boulder clay at Red Cliff on the Humber bank is an archaeological site returning Roman deposits. Minor landmarks and sites of interest include Nut Wood and Wauldby Scrogs (now a Woodland Trust property) in Wauldby, and the Raikes mausoleum within the wooded valley of Welton Dale.

== Welton village and dale ==
Welton village lies at the southern end of Welton dale; both village and valley have been long appreciated for their picturesque qualities. The Church of St Helen is at the centre of the village, with a defunct mill pond to the north and west. (Note: The associated mill Low Mill had been demolished by 1910. Source: Ordnance Survey maps, 1:2500, 1890 and 1910 editions.) Most of the village's housing is of brick, predominantly red, some painted or rendered in with most buildings two storied, either Georgian or Victorian in style.

Welton was recorded in Domesday Book in the 11th century as "Welleton", then a small village with 53 persons recorded and no church. The name derives from the old English wella (spring) and tūn meaning "farm by the spring(s)"; (Note: Welleton in Domesday Book (1086), also recorded as variants including Welletuna, Wellentone, Weleton during the 11th, 12th and 13th centuries. The spelling "Welton" is recorded in 1249.) the area is the site of several springs, (see also gipseys) including St Annes Well in the grounds of the former Welton House.

The name 'Welton with Melton', and sometimes 'Welton cum Melton' has been used to differentiate from other larger nearby towns called Welton, such as Welton, Lincolnshire.

In 1519 the first recorded instance of an accidental fatal shooting in England was recorded at Welton. The highwayman Dick Turpin was charged with horse theft from Thomas Creasy at Welton in 1739 and later tried and hanged in York, in local legend he was arrested at the Green Dragon in Welton.

Welton Inclosure Act 1750
- Act of Parliament
- Parliament of Great Britain
- Long title: An Act to confirm and establish an Agreement, for enclosing and dividing several Lands and Grounds, in the Parish of Welton, in the County of York, and for settling a Yearly Sum on the Vicar, in Lieu of Tithes, and other Purposes therein mentioned.
- Citation: 24 Geo. 2. c. 22 Pr.
- Territorial extent: Great Britain

Dates
- Royal assent: 22 May 1751
- Commencement: 14 November 1751 (Note: Start of session.)

Status: Current legislation

Welton Inclosure Act 1771
- Act of Parliament
- Parliament of Great Britain
- Long title: An Act for dividing and enclosing certain Fields, Lands, and Waste Grounds, within the Township of Melton, in the Parish of Welton, in the East Riding of the County of York.
- Citation: 11 Geo. 3. c. 52 Pr.
- Territorial extent: Great Britain

Dates
- Royal assent: 28 March 1771
- Commencement: 13 November 1770

Status: Current legislation

Welton (Yorkshire) Inclosure Act 1772
- Act of Parliament
- Parliament of Great Britain
- Long title: An Act for dividing and enclosing certain Open fields, Lands, and Waste Grounds, within the Township of Welton, in the East Riding of the County of York.
- Citation: 12 Geo. 3. c. 61 Pr.
- Territorial extent: Great Britain

Dates
- Royal assent: 16 April 1772
- Commencement: 21 January 1772

Status: Current legislation

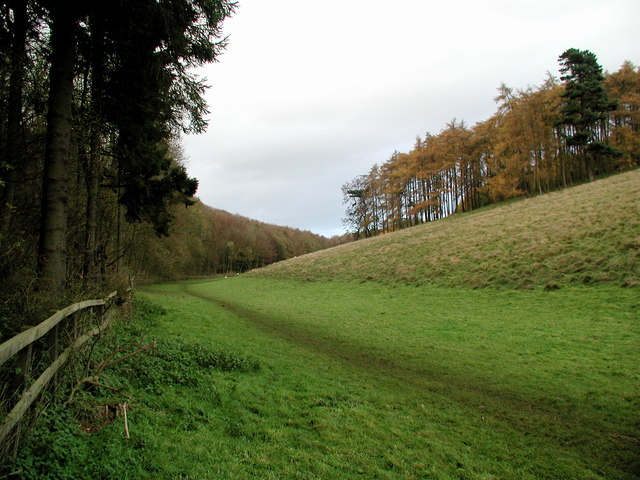
Welton Dale (2006)

Enclosure of the township was enabled by the Welton Inclosure Act 1750 (24 Geo. 2. c. 22 Pr.), the Welton Inclosure Act 1771 (11 Geo. 3. c. 52 Pr.), and the Welton (Yorkshire) Inclosure Act 1772 (12 Geo. 3. c. 61 Pr.). The Williamson's, merchants of Hull undertook much of the tree plantation along the roads around Welton, and in Welton Dale. Welton Mill located at the northern edge of the village at the bottom of Welton dale was constructed in the late 1700s and early 1800s, and altered in 1861; it is a five-storey brick built building, with a breastshot water wheel of 35 ft (11 m) diameter. Raikes mausoleum at the northern end of the dale close to Wauldby was built 1818.

The village's population increased from 449 in 1801 to 672 in 1832, in 1861 it was 688. By the 1855 the village was well established; in addition to modest dwellings there were substantial houses and halls within and on the village's periphery: Welton Grange (about 1741), Welton Hall (about 1770), Welton House (rebuilt 1769/9), Spring Hill (later Welton Manor, built 1820), Welton Hill (1830) Welton Garth (1830s), and the vicarage of the church of St Helen's. The mill (High Mill) and pond at the northern outskirts of the village at the bottom of Melton Dale were also established. In addition to the parish church several non-conformist missions had been established by the 1850s including meeting places for Wesleyan Methodists, Unitarians, Primitive Methodists and Independents, both Wesleyans and Primitives had chapels built in 1815 and 1869 respectively.

Welton House was demolished in 1952, St Anne's Community Special School was established on part of the site in 1974.

Welton was made a conservation area in 1974, several village buildings built during the 18th and 19th century are grade II listed, as are the larger houses of Welton Hill, Welton Lodge, Welton Grange, Welton Manor, and Welton Hill. The Green Dragon, Welton Mill, St Helen's church and the memorial fountain on the village green are also listed.

=== St Helen's church ===
It has been speculated that a church existed in Welton before 1100, the current church is thought to date from the reign of William Rufus; coins from the period were found in the foundations of part of the church during its 19th-century restoration. The church was restored several times through its history; in the 1860s a substantial restoration of the church took place, at a cost of £6,000 funded by a Miss Broadley of Welton. The restoration was by George Gilbert Scott, resulting in a church in a 13th-century gothic revival style; the resulting structure was essentially rebuilt and added a south aisle and north transept, with some 15th-century columns and arches, and a piscina retained, a scalloped column capital, an effigy of a knight, and a lancet window date to the 12th and 13th centuries. The restoration also introduced stained glass windows by William Morris and Edward Burne-Jones, and by Jean-Baptiste Capronnier.

The church was grade II* listed in 1968.

Welton village and Welton dale
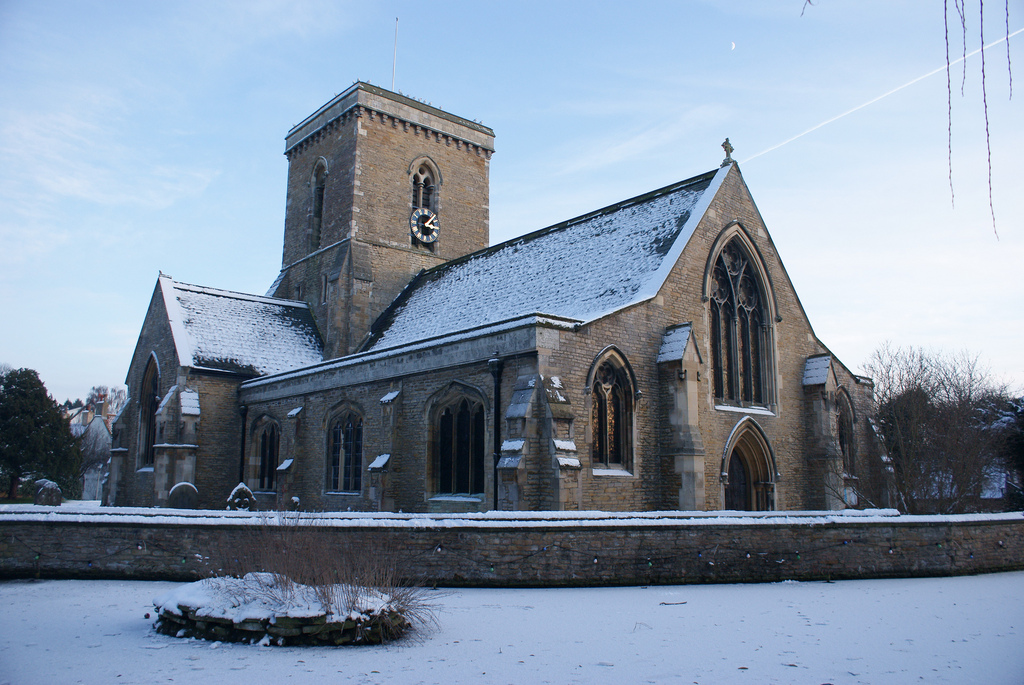
St Helen's, Welton, rebuilt 1862 (December 2009)

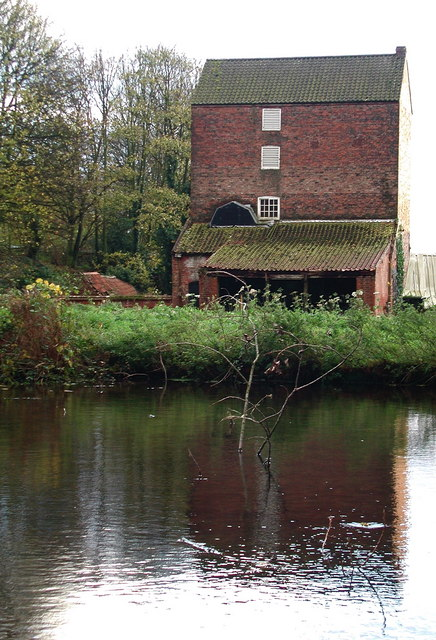
Welton High Mill, late 18th – early 19th century (2006)

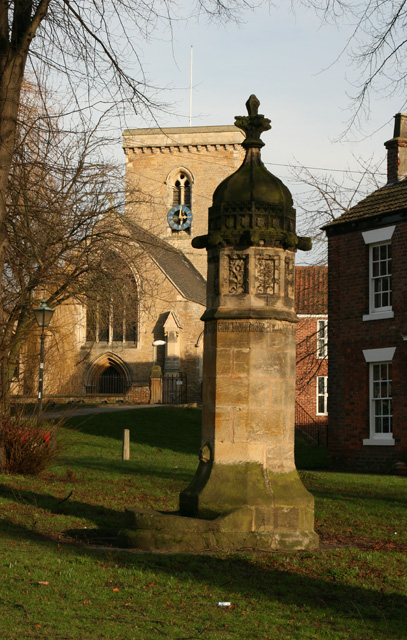
Memorial water fountain, Welton green, 1870s (2008)

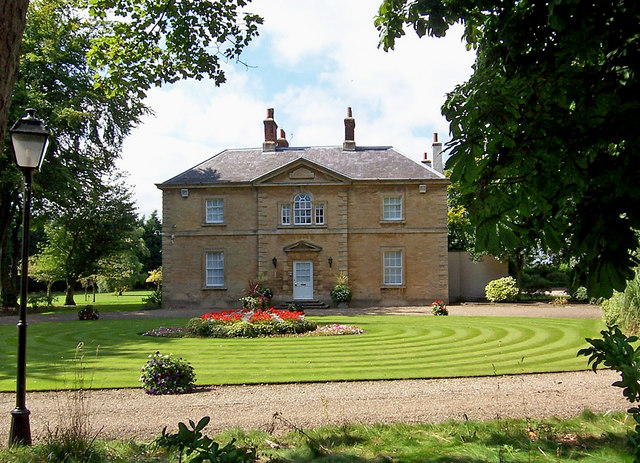
Welton Grange, built about 1740s (2007)

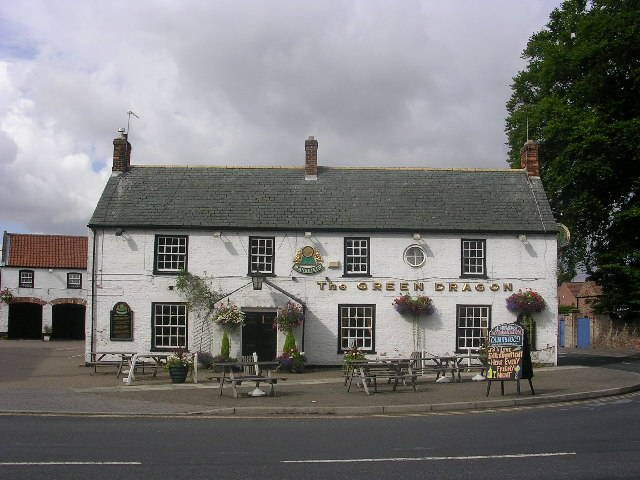
The Green Dragon, Welton, about 18th century (2005)

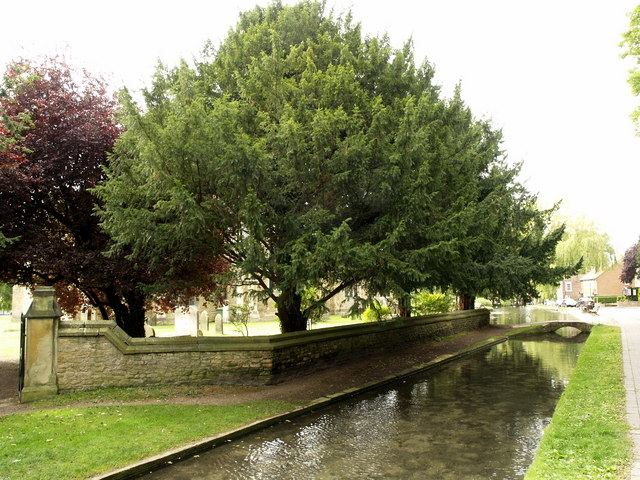
Former mill pond, Welton green (2007)

== Welton civil parish ==
The main habitation in Welton civil parish is Welton village; the village of Melton is the only other village sized habitation; Wauldby, a former village, consists of a manor house, farm buildings and cottages. The parish is primarily rural, the northern part is within the Yorkshire Wolds with a high point of 436 feet (133 m) in the north-west of the parish, the southern part is in low-lying land on the banks of the Humber Estuary at an elevation of around 66 feet (20 m) or less. Both Welton and Melton villages lie at the foot of the Wolds hills; to the south were Welton Common and Melton Common, and near the Humber bank Welton Ings and Melton Ings. (see Ings).

The Hull and Selby Railway (1840), and the A63 road (1963) link Kingston upon Hull westwards and forming north to south barriers to movement in the parish.

=== History ===
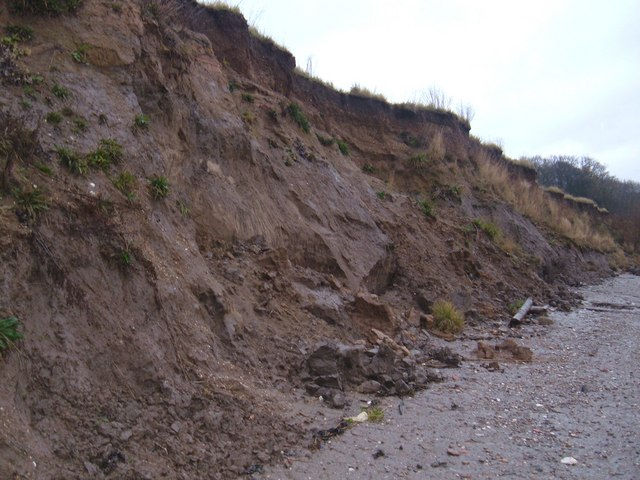
Redcliff, Humber foreshore, south-eastern corner of parish (2009)

Human activity in the parish dates to the prehistoric period, Redcliff, (Note: SE981249, Redcliff, Welton. Red Cliff or Redcliff is a short length of exposed cliff on the north bank of the Humber, at the position of the Humber Gap where the Humber crosses the line of hills of formed by the Yorkshire Wolds and Lincolnshire Wolds) on the Humber bank at the boundary with the neighbouring parish of North Ferriby is evidenced to have been a trading site during the period of the Roman conquest of Britain (1st century AD), evidence of iron working at the site has also been found. A linear Roman villa existed at Welton Wold, thought to be the earliest example in the East Riding, (Note: SE972282, villa at Welton Wold, uncovered near Melton Quarry.) the Roman villa was demolished by 340 AD, and the entire location destroyed by quarrying in the 20th century.

Both Wauldby and Welton were recorded in Domesday Book in the 11th century.

At the time of the first inclosure act affecting Welton (1751) the banks of the Humber were improved, preventing flooding of approximately 300 acres (120 ha) of "Welton Ings", with drains constructed, and roads made to access the improved pasture. A further 1,500 acres (610 ha) were enclosed by a second 1772 act.

The parish was enlarged in 1888 by adding part of the chapelry of Melton and then absorbed the rest of it in 1935; the township of Wauldby became part of the parish in 1935.

Industrial development altered the physical geography of the parish during the 20th century; in 1892 the only development was a brick and tile works on the Humber bank, excluding numerous small pits dug in the wolds for chalk extraction. In the 1920s the Humber Portland Cement Co. Ltd. was established, and a quarry Melton Bottom Quarry opened. Clay extraction for the cement works became extensive and eventually extended westwards along the Humber bank into Welton Ings. A tin smelting works Capper Pass, Melton opened in 1937. By 2000 the cement works and smelter had closed, with some residual chalk processing activity (Quicklime manufacture) at the cement works site. In the early 2000 the industrial sites began to be redeveloped into warehousing and manufacturing estates (named 'Melton Park'); additionally the Melton West industrial estate (2007, extended 2011), and another Melton Park (or Melton Business Park) industrial/commercial estate (begun 2007) were built on a mostly greenfield site between the A63 and railway line, and increased the area given over to non-agricultural development beyond that used by the earlier cement and tin works. Part of the former clay pits in Welton Ings were used as an artificial lake, Welton Waters, of 100 acres (40 ha), and used for recreational sailing, and other activities. As of 2012, quarrying at Melton Bottom Quarry continues.

By 1970 greenhouse based horticulture had started to be developed south of Welton village – this became extensive and extended westwards into the neighbouring parish of Elloughton-cum-Brough by the 1980s; by 2006 this had been reduced in scale, in part due to the expansion of the suburban outskirts of Brough, which by 2006 extended into the western fringe of the parish.

Welton civil parish outside Welton village
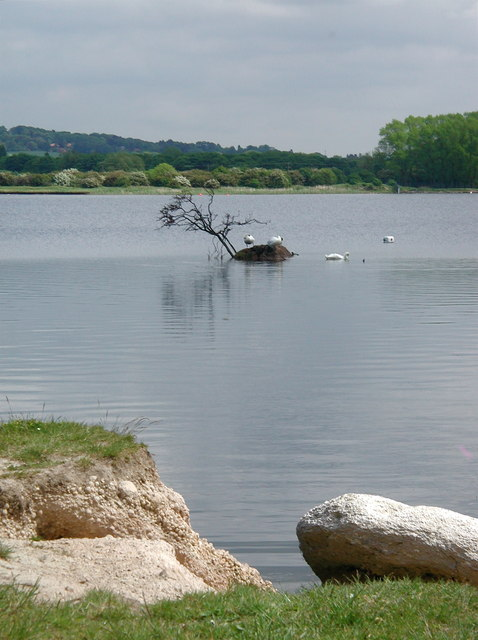
Welton Water (2006)

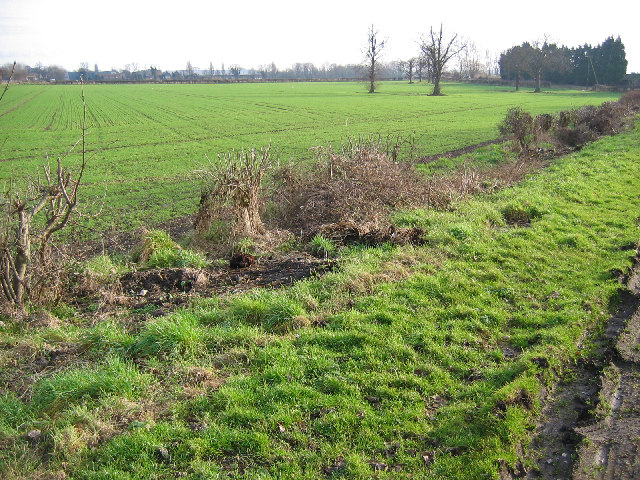
View over Welton Common (2006)

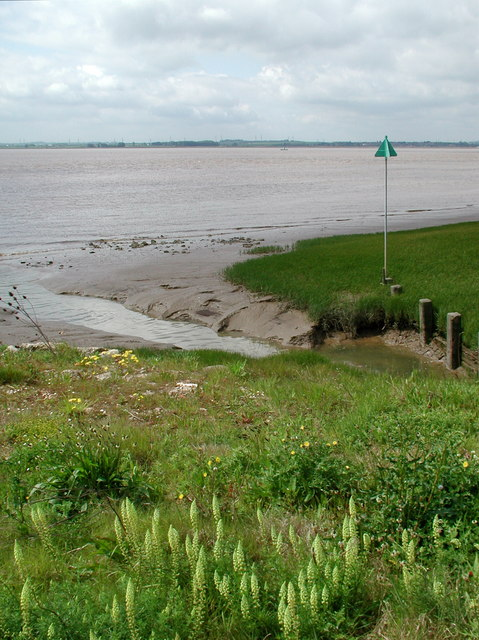
West clough, drain outlet onto Humber (2007)

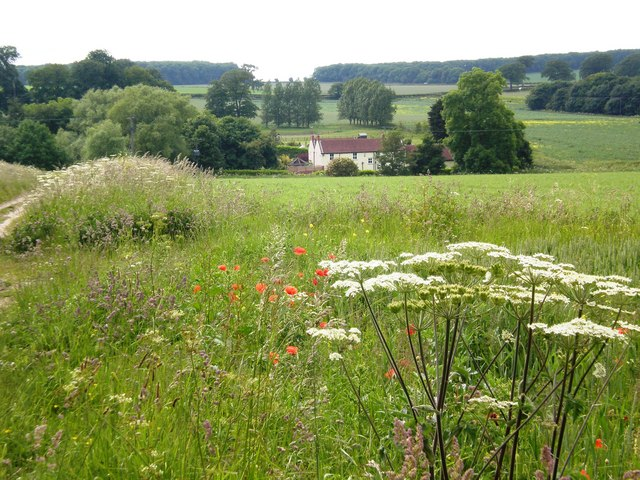
Near Wauldby Manor farm, northern parish (2009)

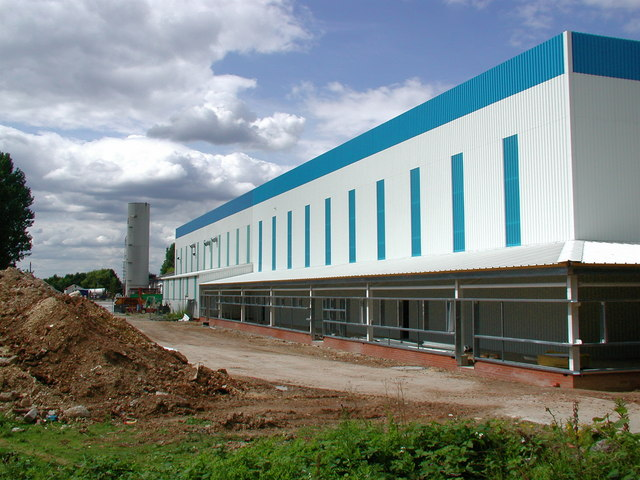
OMYA industrial building, Melton Common (2008)

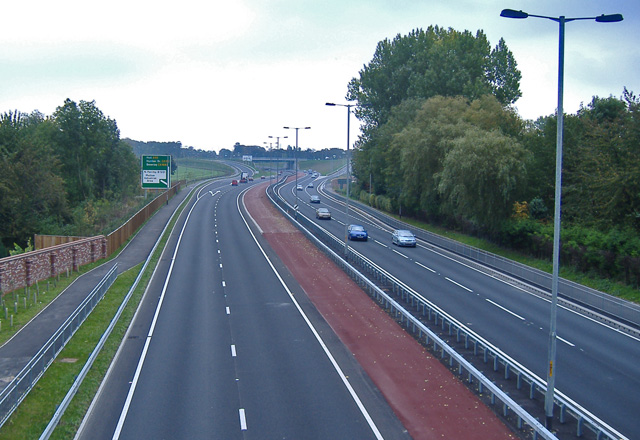
A63 grade separated junction (2007)

== Notable people ==
- Elizabeth Sanderson, Baroness Sanderson of Welton, British political advisor, life peer, and journalist
- Jacqueline Stieger, sculptor and medallist, has lived and worked at Welton since 1969

== See also ==
- Listed buildings in Welton, East Riding of Yorkshire
