= Listed buildings in Welton, East Riding of Yorkshire =

Welton is a civil parish in the county of the East Riding of Yorkshire, England. It contains 34 listed buildings that are recorded in the National Heritage List for England. Of these, two are listed at Grade II*, the middle of the three grades, and the others are at Grade II, the lowest grade. The parish contains the villages of Welton and Melton, the hamlet of Wauldby, and the surrounding countryside. Most of the listed buildings are houses, cottages and associated structures, and the others include a church and a chapel, a public house, a former watermill, a mausoleum and a drinking fountain.

== Key ==
Grade	Criteria
II*	Particularly important buildings of more than special interest
II	Buildings of national importance and special interest

== Buildings ==
Name and location	Photograph	Date	Notes	Grade
St Helen's Church; 53.73338°N 0.54768°W		15th century	The church was restored and largely rebuilt in 1862–63 by George Gilbert Scott, reusing some older material. It is in limestone, with freestone dressings, and slate roofs. The church consists of a nave, north and south aisles, a south porch, north and south transepts, a chancel with a north vestry, and a central tower. The tower has angle buttresses, small oblong windows, a clock face, a string course, two-light pointed bell openings with hood moulds, and a bracketed parapet.	II*
14 and 16 Church Street; 53.73299°N 0.54776°W		Early 18th century	The house is in chalk and limestone, with some brick, and a pantile roof with raised gables. There is one storey and attics, and three bays, the right bay having been rebuilt. On the ground floor is a doorway and horizontally sliding sash windows, and above are three gabled roof dormers with two-light casements.	II
Green Dragon Public House; 53.73301°N 0.54953°W		Early to mid-18th century	The public house is in colourwashed brick with a slate roof. There are two storeys and four bays. On the front is a projecting porch, and the windows are sashes, those on the ground floor with wedge lintels. On the upper floor is a tilting oculus.	II
Pair of cottages east of the Green Dragon Public House; 53.73289°N 0.54933°W		Early to mid-18th century	The cottages are in colourwashed brick, and have a pantile roof with a raised coped gable on the left. There are two storeys and three bays. On the front are two doorways with divided fanlights. The windows are sashes, one horizontally sliding, some with a flat gauged brick arch and the others under segmental arches.	II
Welton Garth; 53.73145°N 0.55074°W		Early to mid-18th century	The house, which was later extended on both sides, is in colourwashed rendered brick, with a timber eaves cornice on paired brackets, and slate roofs with raised coped gables on stone kneelers. There are two storeys, and the original block has three bays. On the front is a long gabled timber porch with trellised sides on a brick porch with a doorway, the windows are horizontally sliding sash windows. To the left is a projecting canted range with sash windows, and a bracketed coped parapet. Further to the left is a single-story single-bay extension with an unusual window. On the right of the main block is a taller projecting three-bay extension with a tripartite sash window, horizontally sliding sashes under cambered brick arches, and two oblong windows.	II
Welton Grange; 53.73242°N 0.55140°W		c. 1741	The house is in brown limestone on a plinth, with stone dressings, rusticated quoins, a floor band, and a hipped slate roof. There are two storeys and three bays, the middle bay projecting under a pediment with a blank panel. The central doorway has a rusticated surround and a projecting keystone under a floating pediment with a floral design in the tympanum. Above the doorway is a Venetian window with a moulded cornice and a projecting keystone, and the other windows are sashes in raised surrounds. The interior is lavish.	II*
Melton Grange; 53.72459°N 0.52783°W	—	c. 1745	The house is in colourwashed brick, with a floor band, a dentilled brick eaves cornice, and pantile roofs with coped gables on shaped kneelers. There are two storeys and three bays, and a rear wing. The middle bay of the main range projects sightly and contains a doorway with pilasters, and a fanlight with radial glazing. This is flanked by small canted bay windows, and on the upper floor are sash windows under flat gauged brick arches. The rear wing has a gabled porch, and contains casement windows with hood moulds.	II
Creyke Lodge; 53.73212°N 0.54861°W	—	Mid-18th century	The house is in colourwashed brick, with a low parapet, and a pantile roof with raised coped gables. There are two storeys and three bays, the middle bay projecting slightly. In the centre is a doorway with a fanlight, the windows are sashes, and there are three three-light roof dormers.	II
The Laurels; 53.72712°N 0.52990°W	—	Mid-18th century	The house is red brick, with a moulded timber eaves cornice, and a pantile roof with tumbled-in brick to the raised gables on brick kneelers. There are two storeys and five bays, the middle bay projecting slightly. On the middle bay is a doorway flanked by attached shafts with Tower of the Winds capitals, a fanlight, a plain frieze, and a modillion pediment over a raked cornice. The windows are sashes, and there are two raking roof dormers with horizontally sliding sashes.	II
Memorial Hall; 53.73358°N 0.54862°W	—	Mid to late 18th century	A house, later a club, in brick with a pantile roof. There are two storeys and five bays, the middle bay projecting slightly. The central doorway has a divided fanlight, and a timber canopy with a lantern. The windows are sashes under flat brick arches.	II
Welton Lodge; 53.73430°N 0.54596°W		Mid to late 18th century	The house is in colourwashed and rendered brick, on a ramped plinth, with moulded floor and sill bands, and a hipped pantile roof. There are two storeys and five bays, with later additions to the right and the rear. The middle bay projects slightly under a pediment, and contains a porch, and a doorway with a fanlight. The windows are sashes in eared architraves, the window above the doorway with a keystone, and above are two gabled roof dormers. At the rear is a doorway in a moulded architrave with an elliptical fanlight and a projecting canopy. To the left is an oval window, and to the right is a shallow segmental full-height bow window.	II
Welton Hall; 53.73454°N 0.54693°W	—	c. 1770	The house is roughcast and colourwashed, with stone dressings, a floor band, a moulded eaves cornice, a low coped parapet with recessed balustraded panels, and a slate roof with raised coped gables. There are two storeys and three bays, and a later extension on the right with two storeys and one bay. On the front is an Ionic doorcase with a fluted frieze with paterae, under a pediment, and a doorway with radial glazing in a round-headed architrave. This is flanked by two-storey canted bay windows. The extension contains sash windows.	II
2 Church Street; 53.73265°N 0.54852°W		Late 18th century	The house is pebbledashed and colourwashed, and has a hipped pantile roof. There are two storeys and five bays. In the centre is a projecting porch, and a doorway with an architrave, a fanlight, a cornice and a blocking course. Above the porch is a Venetian window under an arched wedge lintel with a bracketed sill. The other windows are sashes on bracketed sills, under flat wedge lintels.	II
3 Ladywellgate; 53.73314°N 0.54660°W	—	Late 18th century	The house is in colourwashed brick, and has a pantile roof with raised coped gables on shaped kneelers. There are two storeys and attics, four bays, and a rear wing. The doorway has pilasters and a dentilled pediment, and the windows are sashes under cambered gauged brick arches. Above are two gabled roof dormers with fixed windows.	II
4 The Green; 53.73282°N 0.54912°W	—	Late 18th century	The house is pebbledashed and colourwashed, and has a slate roof with raised gables on kneelers. There are two storeys and three bays. The doorway has pilasters, panelled reveals and soffit, and a fanlight, and the windows are sashes.	II
Hawthorne House; 53.73257°N 0.55036°W	—	Late 18th century	The house is in colourwashed brick, and has a Welsh slate roof with raised coped gables on shaped kneelers. There are two storeys and attics, and three bays, and a later two-storey two-bay wing to the right. The doorway has a pulvinated frieze and a dentilled cornice, and is flanked by canted bay windows, with sashes separated by Tuscan shafts under low parapets. The windows on the upper floor and the wing are sashes, and above are four swept roof dormers with horizontally sliding sashes.	II
Coach house and stables, Melton Hill; 53.73024°N 0.52396°W	—	Late 18th century	The coach house and stables are in colourwashed brick with a hipped slate roof. They consist of a central two-storey bay flanked by lower three-bay ranges. The central bay has an elliptical-headed carriage entrance with impost bands, above which is a taking-in door, an eaves band, oversailing eaves, and a pediment. The outer ranges contain round-headed blank aches containing windows. The carriageway has a groin vault, three bays, and brick pilasters with caps.	II
Mill House; 53.73613°N 0.54526°W	—	Late 18th century	The house is in red brick, with a cogged brick eaves cornice, and a pantile roof with tumbled-in brick to the raised coped gables with brick kneelers. There are two storeys and three bays. In the centre is a doorway in an architrave, with a pulvinated frieze containing a central blank panel, and a moulded cornice, and the windows are sashes.	II
The Cottage; 53.73335°N 0.54680°W	—	Late 18th century	The house is in colourwashed brick, with stone dressings, a bracketed timber eaves cornice, and a pantile roof with raised coped gables on shaped kneelers. There are two storeys and five bays, and a rear outshut. In the centre is a flat-roofed Tuscan porch and a doorway with a fanlight. The windows are sashes.	II
Stable, Welton Garth; 53.73121°N 0.55090°W		Late 18th century	The stable, later used for other purposes, is in colourwashed brick, with a stepped brick eaves cornice, and a pantile roof with tumbled-in brick to the raised gables. There are two storeys, an initial block of two bays, and a single-bay extension to the left. On the front are sash windows, and the entrance is on the left return.	II
Gates and gate piers, Welton Hall; 53.73408°N 0.54662°W	—	Late 18th century	The gate piers flanking the entrance to the ground are in stone, and each has a moulded base under a recessed panel and a string course, above which is an elongated recessed panel, a frieze with an oval rosette, a cornice, and a cap with floral ornament. The gates are in wrought iron, and have a lower dog rail and a serpentine top rail.	II
Shaws House; 53.73296°N 0.54814°W	—	1784	The house is in colourwashed brick, with a stepped brick eaves cornice, and a pantile roof with raised gables. There are two storeys and three bays. The central doorway has pilasters, a fanlight with decorative glazing and a dentilled cornice, and the windows are sashes. Above the doorway is an initialled datestone.	II
Coach house, Melton Grange; 53.72474°N 0.52823°W	—	Late 18th to early 19th century	The coach house is in colourwashed brick and limestone, and has a hipped pantile roof with crested ridge tiles. There are two storeys and five bays. On the ground floor is a carriage entrance, doorways and windows, all under segmental brick arches. Above the carriage entrance is a four-light window, and the other bays contain louvred openings.	II
Welton Mill; 53.73621°N 0.54495°W		Late 18th to early 19th century	The former watermill is in brick, with a stepped brick eaves cornice and a pantile roof. There are five storeys and two bays. The windows are two-light horizontally sliding sashes with glazing bars or louvers.	II
The Raikes Mausoleum; 53.75020°N 0.53655°W		1818	The mausoleum, which commemorates Sir Robert Raikes, is in limestone. It has a circular plan, with one tall storey on a basement. The building has a rusticated base, steps lead to a doorway in an architrave, over which is a decorated frieze, a projecting cornice and an inscribed panel. Around the building are eight Doric pilasters, above which is a frieze of triglyphs and guttae, a Doric cornice, a blocking course, and a stepped stone dome.	II
30 and 32 Cowgate; 53.73264°N 0.55037°W	—	Early 19th century	A pair of houses in painted brick, with stone dressings, a bracketed eaves gutter, and a slate roof with stone coped gables. There are two storeys and three bays. In the centre are paired doorways with panelled pilasters, fanlights, cornices and a continuous cornice. Above the doorways is a blind window, the other windows are sashes, and all are under wedge lintels.	II
Barn House; 53.73331°N 0.54920°W		Early 19th century	The house is in red brick, with a timber eaves cornice on paired brackets, and a Roman tile roof. There are two storeys and four bays. On the front is a Tuscan doorcase, and a doorway with panelled reveals, a soffit and a fanlight. On the extreme right is a 20th-century shopfront, and to its left is a doorway under a flat gauged brick arch. The windows are sashes under gauged brick arches.	II
Welton Hill; 53.73478°N 0.54881°W	—	c. 1830	The house is in white brick, with paired brackets to the eaves cornice and a slate roof. There are two storeys and three bays. On the front is a Tuscan porch, and a doorway with a panelled soffit and reveals, and a fanlight with radial glazing. The windows are sashes under channelled cambered wedge lintels with keystones. On the garden front are two full-height canted bay windows, and a low coped parapet with latticed cast iron railings.	II
Gates and gate piers, Welton Hill; 53.73479°N 0.5481°W	—	c. 1830	The gate piers flanking the entrance to the ground are in rusticated stone, and each has a moulded base, a cornice, and a low pyramidal cap. The gates are in cast iron, and have a lower latticed band, railings and paired concave upper rails.	II
Welton Manor; 53.73389°N 0.55003°W		c. 1830	The house is in white brick, with stone dressings, on a plinth, with a floor band, a timber eaves cornice on painted brackets, the extension is in red brick, and the slate roofs are hipped. The main range has two storeys and three bays. On the front is a Greek Doric porch with an entablature and a blocking course, and the doorway has panelled reveals and a soffit, and a fanlight with radial glazing. The windows are sashes under cambered gauged brick arches, the window above the porch in a recess.	II
9 The Green; 53.73314°N 0.54857°W	—	Early to mid-19th century	The house is in red brick, with painted stone dressings, a bracketed eaves cornice, and a tile roof. There are two storeys and three bays. The central doorway has a chamfered surround, a fanlight, consoles and a cornice, and the windows are sashes with wedge lintels.	II
Manor Farmhouse; 53.75497°N 0.53260°W		1839	The house is in brick with stone dressings and hipped slate roofs. There are two storeys and five bays. In the centre is a porch with paired pilasters and a modillion pediment, and the doorway has a fanlight with radial glazing. The windows are sashes with wedge lintels.	II
Wauldby Chapel; 53.75504°N 0.53186°W		1844	The chapel, designed by J. L. Pearson, is in stone, with freestone dressings, on a moulded plinth, and it has a slate roof with coped gables. The chapel consists of a four-bay nave, a south porch, and a two-bay chancel with a north vestry. Most of the windows are lancets, and on the west gable is a sexfoil window.	II
Fountain and basin 53.73316°N 0.54887°W		1874	The drinking fountain is in stone, and in Perpendicular style. It consists of an octagonal pier with a string course, an inscription, and ornamental panels on the top. The cornice is decorated with diapering and brattishing, and there are grotesque figures on the corners. There is a frieze of shields under an ogee cap with a poppyhead finial. At the base is a basin hollowed out of stone.	II
