= Melton, East Riding of Yorkshire =

Village in the East Riding of Yorkshire, England

Melton
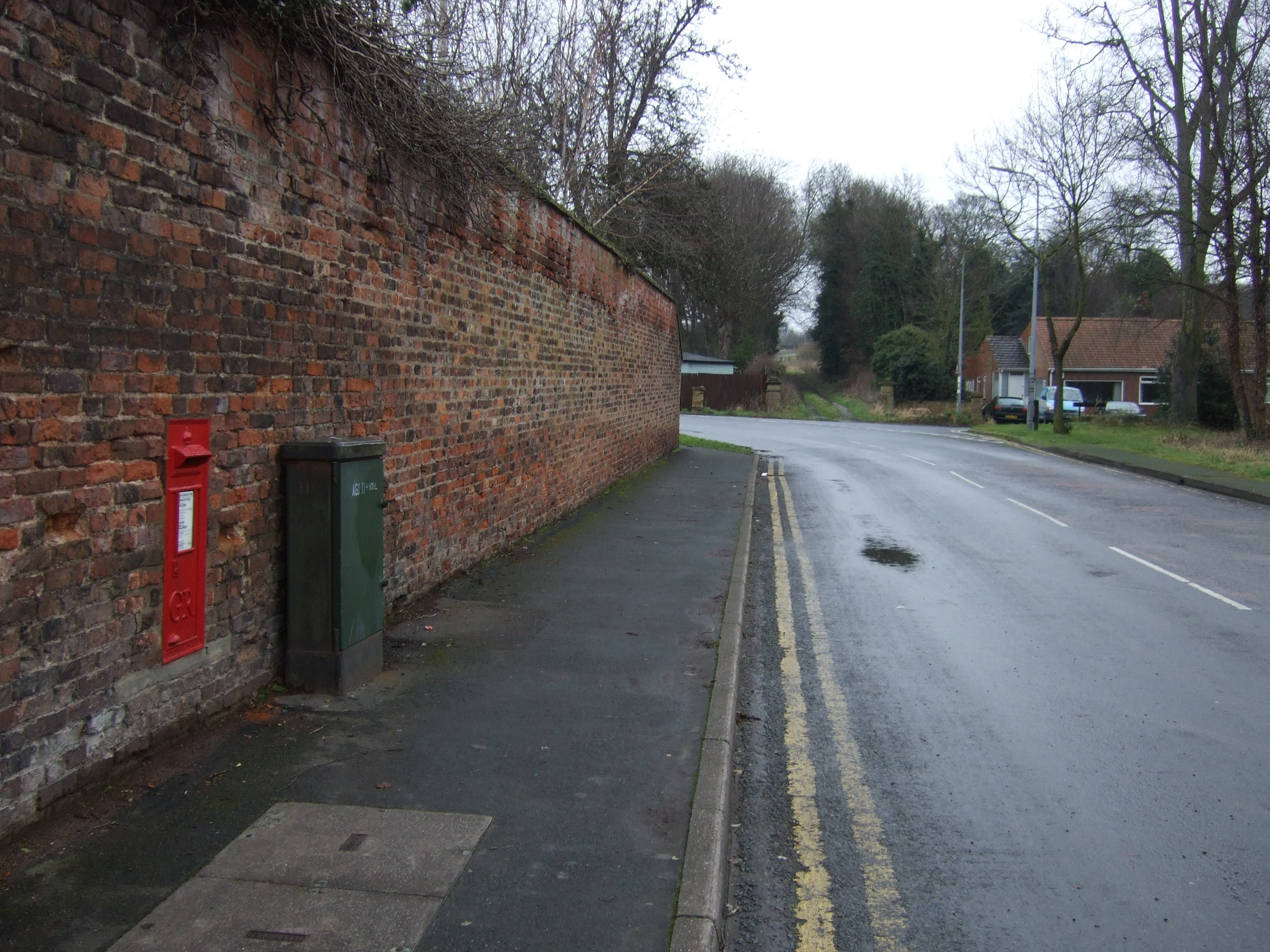
- Gibson Lane North

- Location within the East Riding of Yorkshire
- OS grid reference: SE971265
  - London: 150 mi (240 km) S
- Civil parish: Welton
- Unitary authority: East Riding of Yorkshire
- Ceremonial county: East Riding of Yorkshire
- Region: Yorkshire and the Humber
- Country: England
- Sovereign state: United Kingdom
- Post town: NORTH FERRIBY
- Postcode district: HU14
- Dialling code: 01482
- Police: Humberside
- Fire: Humberside
- Ambulance: Yorkshire
- UK Parliament: Goole and Pocklington

Melton is a village in the civil parish of Welton, East Riding of Yorkshire, England. It is situated about 8 miles (13 km) west of Kingston upon Hull city centre near to the Humber Estuary and about 0.6 miles (1 km) east of the village of Welton, with which it is nearly contiguous.

== Modern geography ==
The village is bounded to the south by the A63 road, and is 0.6 miles (1 km) north of the Humber Estuary bank. The village is on the southern edge of the Yorkshire Wolds approximately 15 to 20 m (49 to 66 ft) above sea level, to the north-east 'Melton Hill' rises to a height of 92 m (302 ft). The A63 road passes east–west directly south of Melton, and effectively divides the low-lying clays of the Humber foreshore from the chalk uphills of the Wolds. In 2002–03 the village became part of the South Hunsley Ward of the East Riding of Yorkshire, and within the Goole and Pocklington parliamentary constituency. South Hunsley School is located on the western fringes of the village.

== History ==
The name Melton derives from the Old English middeltūn meaning 'middle settlement'.

William Melton, Archbishop of York (died 1340) is thought to have originated from Melton. The land around Melton was enclosed by Act of Parliament in 1771/3. By the beginning of the 19th century the village and environs became the dwelling place of several worthies of Kingston upon Hull; including Benjamin Blaydes (1735–1805), and J. S. Williamson at Melton Hill. In 1823 the population was 107. Melton Grange was built around 1745, Melton Hill to the higher ground north-east of the village was established in the late 1700s, Melton House was constructed around 1830; a Roman burial was discovered near Melton House around 1840, including a gold brooch. (Note: The 1927/9 6" to 1 mile and 25" to 1 mile Ordnance Survey map (239NW and 239.6) records an antiquity find labelled "Roman Brooch, Bead, & Human Remains found AD 1841" at the disused Greystones Pit (chalk) north-east of Melton)

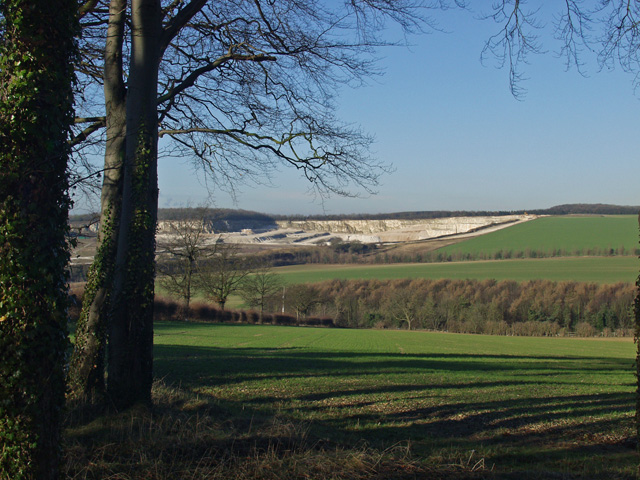
Melton Bottom Quarry (2008)

In 1840 the Hull and Selby Railway opened, passing Melton about 0.6 miles (1 km) south of the village. In 1855 the land around Melton was essential rural, and used for agricultural use, with the exception of the gentrified houses and their gardens, some narrow plantations, and a small brick and tile works south of Melton Common in Melton Ings located on the bank of the Humber Estuary. The brick work's workings continued to expand in the early 1900s and had acquired a tramway system within the clay pits. By the 1920s the tile works had closed, whilst a large scale cement industry had developed; to the north of Melton chalk was extracted at Melton Bottom Quarry, (Note: 53.735270°N 0.521811°W, Melton Bottom Quarry, established 1921 by W. Marshall of Hessle, supplied chalk to Humber Cement Works and later began producing agricultural (1937) and putty (1946) grade chalks. Ownership passed to Blue Circle (1958), later a joint venture with Croxton & Garry and then OMYA.) whilst south of the railway line the Humber Cement Works had been established west of Gibson Lane, (Note: 53.718650°N 0.535943°W, "Humber Cement Works". Established 1921 as "Humber Portland Cement Co. Ltd., original company wound up due to financial problems and from 1924 operated by G & T Earle ('Earles Cement').) the works was connected to the main railway, and served by a small railway halt Melton Halt. (Note: Opened c. 1920. Originally named Melton Crossing Halt, later Melton Halt, financed by the Humber Cement Company for use by workers at the plant. The halt closed 1989.) The Humber Cement Works also operated an industrial tramway south to the Humber bank, and an aerial cableway connecting the plant to a jetty on the Humber bank at West Clough.

Melton was formerly a township and chapelry in the parish of Welton, in 1866 Melton became a separate civil parish, on 1 April 1935 the parish was abolished and merged with Welton. In 1931 the parish had a population of 316.

South of the village worker's housing was constructed in the 1920s and 30s for the Humber Cement Works and for the Capper Pass tin smelter; the Capper Pass Works was constructed in the 1930s for Capper Pass and Son to the south of the Hull and Selby railway line and directly east of Humber Cement.

The houses of Melton House and Melton Hill were demolished in the 1950s. South Hunsley School opened in 1956, on the site of the 1840 Eastdale, which was demolished in the late 1800s. Further houses were built in the village of Melton during the 1960s, at around the same time the scope of extraction of clay and chalk around Melton Bottom Quary was considerably expanded – the worked area expanded south and west, and the Humber Cement Works clay extraction pits also expanded west into Welton Ings. The section of the A63 road passing south of Melton was opened in 1963.

The cement works closed in 1981; a plant supplying Calcium oxide for use in the plastics industry was established on the site in 1990. The Capper Pass, Melton smelting works closed and was decommissioned in the early 1990s. It was a major employer in the wider area, but also a polluter due to the nature of the work it performed; the site was thought to be responsible for a cancer cluster discovered in the west Hull area in the 1980s, as well as having affecting the health of its own employees. In the early 2000s, the site was redeveloped as open air storage and industrial warehousing.

A new grade separated junction was constructed on the A63 east of Melton in 2006/7, replacing three at-grade junctions; link roads giving access to Melton Bottom and to planned business parks south of the A63 were also built. Two large 100 acres (40 ha) industrial estate/business parks Melton West and Melton Park started development south of Melton in the first decade of the 2000s; planning consent for the first phase of 'Melton West' was given in 2007, with the second phase given planning consent in 2011. St. Modwen Properties gained planning permission to develop the 'Melton Park' site in 2006/7, in 2011 the company announced it was planning to use part of the development site for residential development.

As of 2012 the quarry at Melton Bottom is owned by OMYA and produces chalk whiting. A southern working named Melton Bottom Chalk Pit is no longer worked, and is a Site of Special Scientific Interest (SSSI) due to its geological content. The working quarry is known as the Welton Wold Quarry.

== See also ==
- Listed buildings in Welton, East Riding of Yorkshire
