= Wauldby =

Area of the East Riding of Yorkshire, England

Coordinates: 53.754684°N 0.533500°W

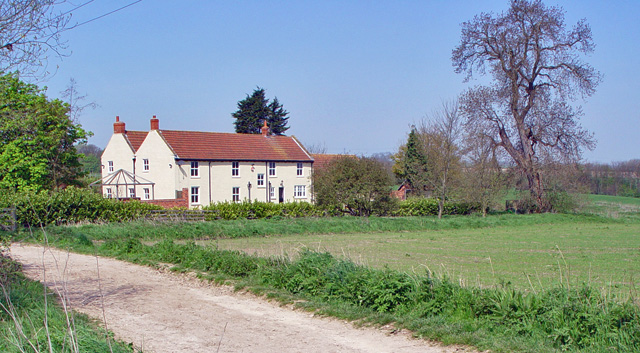
- Cottages at Wauldby

- Location within the East Riding of Yorkshire
- OS grid reference: SE967297
- Civil parish: Welton
- Unitary authority: East Riding of Yorkshire
- Ceremonial county: East Riding of Yorkshire
- Region: Yorkshire and the Humber
- Country: England
- Sovereign state: United Kingdom
- Post town: BROUGH
- Postcode district: HU15
- Dialling code: 01482
- Police: Humberside
- Fire: Humberside
- Ambulance: Yorkshire
- UK Parliament: Goole and Pocklington

Wauldby is a region in the Yorkshire Wolds within the civil parish of Welton in the East Riding of Yorkshire, England. It contains the gentrified hamlet around Wauldby Manor Farm, and a few other minor dwellings including Little Wauldby Farm.

Wauldby was once the site of a village; the habitation was abandoned in mediaeval times.

== Geography ==
Wauldby is situated approximately 2 miles (3.2 km) north of Welton and 3 miles (4.8 km) west of Willerby. It is within the Yorkshire Wolds beyond the head of Welton Dale, at a height of approximately 330 ft (100 m) with a local high point of 381 ft (116 m). The area is entirely rural; there are two minor dwellings: Little Waulby Farm and Waulby Manor Farm with church, manor house outbuildings and cottages, and a pond Wauldby Dam. Most of the land is enclosed field system, there are also minor woods and plantations including the Woodland Trust managed Nut Wood and Wauldby Scrogs.

== History ==
Wauldby was recorded in the 11th century Doomsday survey as "Waldbi", with a population, together with Elloughton, of 36 villeins, 3 smallholders and a priest. The name Waldbi is thought to mean "[place] on the wold", and is Scandinavian in origin. (Note: Etymology: by meaning farmstead or village. The Old Norse völlr (field), the German wald (wood), and the Anglo Saxon weald are words related to the root of the name.)

The original village was depopulated during the mediaeval period. (Note: "Deserted medieval villages, (1971), M. W. Beresford et al gives a location SE 974297; east of the church, whilst "The Buildings of England: Yorkshire: York and the East Riding, (1972), N. Pevsner" states in a footnote that the site of the deserted village is obvious, and to the south of the Church.) (Note: In Archaeological Journal (1845. vol.1, p.97); Letter from J. L. Pearson: ..there were once some buildings existing at Wauldby ... I built a small chapel somewhere on the site of the old buildings for Mr. Raikes..) The area underwent enclosure after 1796. In the 1850s the township of Waulby covered 990 acres (400 ha) and contained 49 people.

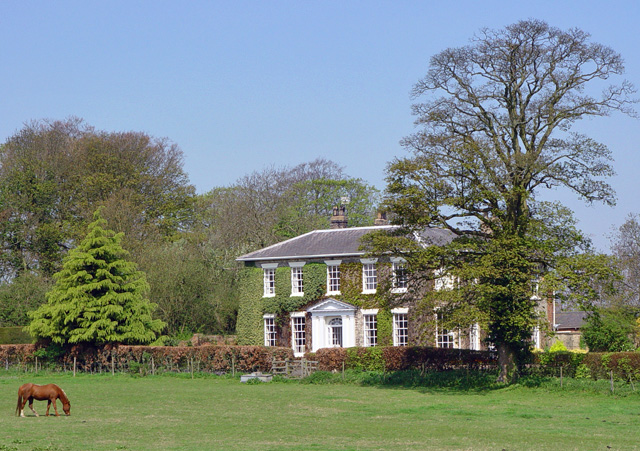
Wauldby Manor Farm

In 1835 a chapel was built on the site of an older chapel of ease by Anne Raikes the then landowner. (Note: Pevsner's Buildings of England and other sources give a date of building of 1844.) It was built in Gothic Revival 13th century style, and is thought to be designed by J. L. Pearson.

Wauldby was formerly a township in the parish of Elloughton, in 1866 Wauldby became a separate civil parish, on 1 April 1935 the parish was abolished and merged with Welton. In 1931 the parish had a population of 51.

Wauldby Hall, also known as Waulby Manor, was rebuilt in 1839.

The house was refurbished in the 1960s by Francis Johnson. The church's bell cote was removed in 1980, and both the manor and church building became grade II listed buildings in 1988. The house, church and 11.2 acres (4.5 ha) of grounds were put up for sale in 2009 at a price of £1.55 million.

== See also ==
- Listed buildings in Welton, East Riding of Yorkshire
