= Robert Raikes (1765–1837) =

British banker and builder of a notable mausoleum

- Born: 1765
- Died: 1837 (aged 71–72)
- Occupation: Banker

Robert Raikes Esq. (1765 – 1837), was an English banker, originally from London, that later established a bank in Kingston upon Hull. After 1805 he lived at Welton House in Welton, East Riding of Yorkshire, where in 1818 he had built a family mausoleum in park land to the north. He was the son of William Raikes, who had built a mausoleum in the Churchyard of St Mary, Woodford, London.

== Biography ==
Robert Raikes was the second son of merchant William Raikes (1737-1800) and banker's daughter Martha Pelly (d. 1797).

In 1789 he married Anne Williamson daughter of William Wilkinson of Welton House. They lived in Essex until 1805 after which moving to Welton House, Welton, East Riding of Yorkshire. In Yorkshire William established a bank in Kingston upon Hull.

Robert Raikes built a beautiful Georgian mausoleum, Raikes Mausoleum for himself and his family in 1818; his father had also constructed a mausoleum in London.

He and Anne Williamson had two sons Thomas (b.1790) and Robert (b. 1801), and two daughters Martha (d.1797) and Anne-Louisa. His grandson through his son Thomas established a Tractarian church at Treberfydd.

He died in 1837.

== The Raikes Mausoleum ==
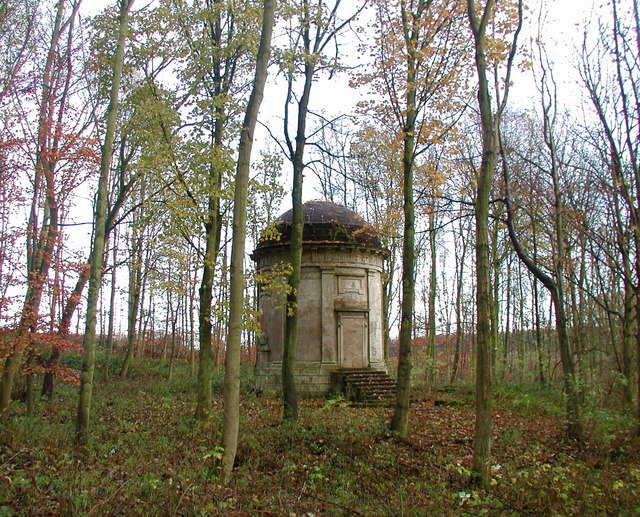
The Raikes Mausoleum (2007)

53.7500199°N 0.5375192°W

The mausoleum was built in 1818 for Robert Raikes, at the north end of Welton Dale, approximately 1 mile (1.6 km) from Welton village and Welton House. The building is circular with a shallow domed roof on top of a frieze decorated with triglyphs, and stands on a circular plinth that originally was railed. The inscription:

AEDIFICAVIT ROBERTUS RAIKES ARMIGER AD MDCCCXVIII

(translation) Robert Raikes, Esquire, built this. 1818 AD

is above the entrance. Eight doric pilasters divide the exterior into bays, alternate bays are blind, the remainder decorated in relief with sarcophagii. The building is faced in light stone, and may have been modelled on an original Roman building. The building is 67 ft (20 m) round and 38 ft (12 m) high.

The land alongside the Mausoleum was consecrated in 1822, for use as 'Welton Dale Burial ground' but was not commonly used.

In 1960 the vault under the mausoleum was broken into, and disturbed, and a skull stolen, later recovered. After a coroners inquest and police investigation the vault was permanently sealed by the then land owner, Sir Basil Parkes.

It has been a grade II listed building since 1968.
