= Capper Pass and Son =

British smelting and refining company

- Industry: Non-ferrous refining
- Defunct: 1991
- Successor: Rio Tinto Zinc (1967 acquisition)
- Key people: Alfred Capper Pass
- Products: Tin, Lead, Bismuth, other non-ferrous metals

Capper Pass and Son Ltd. was a British smelting and refining company specialising in non-ferrous metal refining, particularly tin. Originally established in Bristol in the early 1800s, the company relocated to a site on the banks of the Humber Estuary at Melton, East Riding of Yorkshire, in the 1930s, with the Bristol factories closing in the 1960s. Rio Tinto Zinc acquired the firm in the 1960s.

The Melton plant was a tin smelter of worldwide significance, producing 10% of world output at its peak. By-products of the tin refining process including arsenic caused local pollution, and in the 1980s an additional radioactive hazard due to polonium was discovered. Emissions from the Melton plant were implicated in a child cancer cluster in East Yorkshire; as of 2012 a link has not been scientifically established. The plant's owners Rio Tinto Zinc became involved in long running litigation due to diseases amongst the plant's workers, as well as those in the surrounding area. RTZ paid compensation to 29 ex-employees with lung conditions in 2002 after two decades of denying responsibility.

The Melton plant closed in 1991; its site was cleared and redeveloped for industrial use.

== History ==
=== Foundation, Bristol works (1812–1963) ===
51.441332°N 2.595112°W, Bedminster works

The Capper Pass family business originated in the West Midlands, but moved to the St. Philips area of Bristol in 1812. In 1819 Capper Pass himself was convicted of handling stolen metal and transported to Australia. The sentence was for 14 years, but he stayed there, remarried and had a family, whilst the Bristol operation was run by his descendants. In the 1840s the business relocated to Bedminster. The factory there extracted the non-ferrous metals copper and lead from their ores, as well as processing silver and gold. By 1860 the factory had begun to manufacture solder.

The company was developed and expanded by Alfred Capper Pass, doubling in size between 1872 and 1888. He was born in Bristol in 1837, and took over the business in 1870 when his father died. He became a paternalistic Victorian industrialist, building houses for his workers in Windmill Hill, and donating to the newly founded Bristol University. In 1894 the family business was converted to a limited company. He died in 1905, after which the company was run by non-family members. A chair in chemistry was established at the university in his name.

The works in Bedminster was constrained by its locality, and in 1928 a new factory site was acquired at Melton, East Riding of Yorkshire; the great depression delayed the project; the factory construction and opening occurred in 1936/7. The Bristol works closed in 1963.

=== Melton works, (1937–1991) ===
53.71585°N 0.52822°W, Melton works

Construction of the smelter in the East Riding of Yorkshire began in 1936, and the plant became operational in 1937. The plant was located west of Hull on the banks of the Humber Estuary. It was served by the Hull and Selby railway line, and was close to old clay pits on the bank of the Humber. The plant was designed by civil engineering firm Sir Alexander Gibb & Partners for £170,000, including a row of houses for plant workers built in 1936. (Note: 53.723444°N 0.524432°W, Capper Pass housing, 1936, "Melton Fields" near Brickyard Lane. (Another development of semi-detached housing further south on Brickyard Lane were built for the nearby Earles Cement works; these were demolished approximately 2000s during road improvements creating Monks Way access from A63 / B1231))

Rio Tinto Zinc acquired the company in 1967.

On opening the plant had one blast furnace, and 75 employees; by the beginning of the Second World War three furnaces were operating. During the war ore was difficult to obtain due to shipping warfare. Alternative sources of tin were sought and tin slags from former works in Cornwall were smelted. In 1946 the plant employed 226 people; by 1952 the number of employees had risen to 400, after which the employment numbers levelled.

The plant specialised in smelting low-grade ores and other feedstocks, particularly Bolivian tin ore, and the recycling of flue dust, processing materials other facilities or countries were unable or had refused to process. Tin was the plant's main product; it also produced silver, cadmium, lead, copper, antimony, bismuth, indium, and gold. The plant employed rectangular blast furnaces for tin production, with additional processes such as electrorefining employed to obtain purified by-products.

In 1971 a 600 ft (180 m) chimney was built, replacing the 200 ft (61 m) chimney built in 1938.

In 1980 the plant was the largest smelter of tin from secondary sources, and contributed 10% of the world capacity for tin production. In 1985 the world tin price collapsed, making the plant uneconomic. It closed in 1991 and was decommissioned; the site was sold in 1995.

==== Industrial pollution, disease and cancer cluster ====
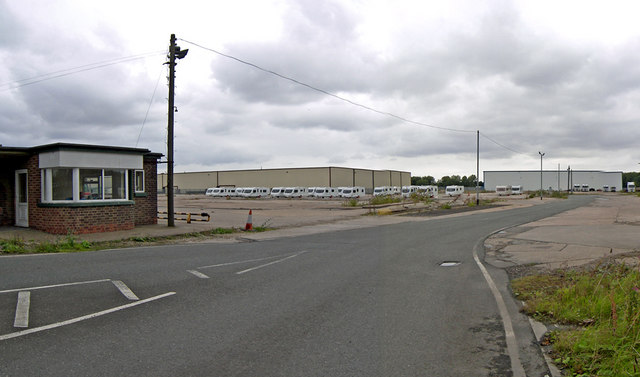
Redeveloped site, 2007, the brick gatehouse dates to the Capper Pass era

In the 1970s levels of arsenic and lead found in farms near to the plant were such that crops and livestock were condemned. The plant also discharged into the Humber Estuary, resulting in significant arsenic pollution; (Note: In the mid 1980s Arsenic in Humber silt was present at 69ppm, with a dissolved concentration of 10mg/L.) in 1997, levels remained slightly elevated in estuary sediments, and it has also been speculated that arsenic discharge has been carried into the North Sea, resulting in high levels in sediments off the Norfolk coast.

In 1984 a bismuth alloy supplied by the plant to a company in Germany was found to be radioactive: alpha radiation was found to be emitted by by-products of the smelting process due to the presence of polonium 210 (a radioisotope with a half-life of about 140 days), thought to be produced via radioactive decay of naturally occurring isotopes in tin-bearing ore bodies such as granite. The plant was subsequently licensed to emit 592 MBq (16 mCu) (1985) and typically emitted less than 10% of that amount, less than background radiation. Most (about 95%) of the polonium bearing materials and radioactivity were confined to the factory, as a result of the high temperature smelting process causing it to evaporate and condense within the plant. The plant's polonium emissions license did not become public knowledge until over two years after it was given.

The works gained notoriety because they were linked in the 1980s with a child cancer cluster in west Hull and surrounding villages; (Willerby and Kirk Ella) in 1988 the plant was part of a feature on radiation in Channel 4's Dispatches documentary "Radioactive Britain". A report from Professor M.S. Baxter of Glasgow University was commissioned by the East Yorkshire Health Authority; which found the previous statistical limits on radioactive exposure to be too high (by a factor of more than 100 times) and recommended revision of the Radioactive Substances Act 1960. A 1996 report recommended improvements in assessment, mitigation and monitoring of radioactive agents in the metallurgical refining industry be made. The Baxter report could not establish a link between the smelter and the cancer cases. (Note: We cannot, in any way, attribute excess cancers to the practices at, or discharges from, the plant. All we can say in summary is that there is far too little information on which to form a sound judgement. (quoted from the report in Hansard, House of Commons, 19 July 1990, vol.176, cc.1283))

After closure of the plant and sale of the site, the former owner Rio Tinto Zinc (RTZ) denied any responsibility or liability for its former asset for over two decades. In 2002 RTZ began proceedings to offer compensation to persons associated with the plant who were affected by disease, which would be reviewed through an independent panel; RTZ did not accept legal liability, whilst the claimants did not need to prove negligence. Over 600 claimants lodged 1,788 claims: 29 claims for lung cancer and 9 claims for chronic obstructive pulmonary disease were settled. The remaining 1,750 claims were rejected.

A study publisher in 2005 led by Sir Richard Doll showed an elevated risk of lung cancer amongst workers at the plant, which was found to be statistically associated with exposure to arsenic and other heavy metals. A study in 2005 of lead and tin levels in soil around the former smelter showed deposition up to 15 miles (24 km) with a distribution trend towards the north-east; the study estimated that about 2,500 tons of lead and 830 tons of zinc had been introduced into the soil surrounding the plant.

==== Redevelopment ====
The former industrial site at Melton has been converted into a 32 acres (0.13 km^{2}) industrial development named Melton Park (Note: Another "Melton Park" (or "Melton Business Park") developed by St. Modwen Properties gained planning permission in 2006/7 – it is located north of the Hull to Selby railway line) used for open storage and warehousing including two industrial units of over 400,000 sq ft (37,000 m^{2}) total, and another unit of approximately 100,000 sq ft (9,300 m^{2}). As of 2012 the site is under development.

=== Other works ===
During the Second World War two companies were acquired: Victor G. Stevens Ltd, of Felling-on-Tyne; and Messrs George Pizey (London). The Pizey plant was moved to Felling. In 1959 plant and equipment of the Stevens' works was relocated to Bristol.
