= Omya =

Swiss industrial minerals company

Omya AG
- Formerly: Plüss-Staufer
- Type: Aktiengesellschaft
- Industry: Chemicals
- Founded: 1884 in Oftringen, Switzerland
- Founder: Johann Gottfried Plüss
- Headquarters: Oftringen, Switzerland
- Products: Chalk and industrial minerals, chemical products
- Number of employees: ~9,000 (2026)
- Website: omya.com

Omya (formerly Plüss-Staufer) is a Swiss company based in Oftringen, active in the chemical industry. Founded in 1884, it has developed into a multinational operating across diverse sectors.

It is a producer of industrial minerals, mainly fillers and pigments derived from calcium carbonate and dolomite, and a worldwide distributor of specialty chemicals.

The company's major markets are forest products (fiber-based products such as paper, board and tissue), polymers, building materials (paints, coatings, sealants, adhesives and construction materials) as well as life sciences (food, feed, pharmaceuticals, cosmetics, environmental products and agriculture).

== History ==
The company grew out of the paint and linseed-oil business of Johann Gottfried Plüss's father at Oftringen. In 1884 Plüss founded the firm Plüss-Staufer, named after his family. An early flagship product was the Plüss-Staufer-Kitt, a putty advertised as gluing and repairing everything. A new factory was built at Oftringen in 1893, which remained the company's seat, and in 1894 the firm bought the chalk quarries Aux Monthées at Omey, in Champagne. Plüss-Staufer became a joint-stock company in 1903.

Plüss's son-in-law Max Schachenmann took over the management in 1924 and passed it to his son of the same name in 1940, the company remaining family-owned. From 2000 the firm was named Omya AG, after the important chalk quarries it owned, and it developed into a multinational active across diverse sectors of the chemical industry, with 6,000 employees in 2007 and 9,000 in 2026.

== Bibliography ==
- 60 Jahre Plüss-Staufer, "Omya" 1884–1944, 1944
- 75 Jahre Plüss-Staufer, Oftringen, 1884–1959, 1959
- 100 Jahre Plüss-Staufer, 1884–1984, 1984
