= 2015–16 Great Britain and Ireland floods =

Great Britain and Ireland were affected by floods during the winter of late 2015 and early 2016. Eleven named storms produced record level rainfall from November 2015 - March 2016 in both monthly and seasonal accumulation records. It produced low pressure floods such as Storm Desmond, Storm Eva, and Storm Frank which caused massive disruption, and damage to the Great Britain areas. Emergency services, and damage management provided a collaboration effort to minimize the damage from the floods to counteract any potential loss.

== Antecedent conditions ==
Western Europe saw a series of extratropical cyclones forming in a westerly flow over the Atlantic, directing warm and moist air to the region. A situation developed in a similar manner to that seen during the Autumn 2000 western Europe floods, which saw catchments and soils becoming increasingly saturated. During November high rainfalls associated with the passage of Storm Abigail and the remains of Ex-hurricane Kate brought increasingly high river flows. Many parts of north-west Britain saw almost double the average monthly rainfall for November fall, with the month becoming the second-wettest to affect north-west England and North Wales (behind November 2009) since records began in 1910.

== Storm Desmond (5 December) ==
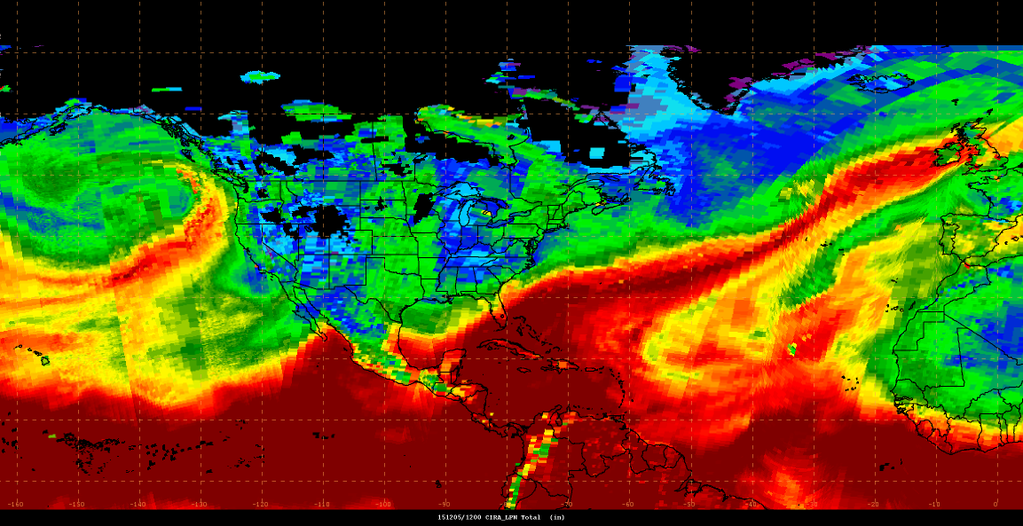
Satellite image of the plume of moist air, known as an atmospheric river, brought to Western Europe by Desmond

Storm Desmond broke the United Kingdom's 24-hour rainfall record, with 341.4 mm of rain falling at Honister Pass, Cumbria, on 5 December 2015. The previous record was set in 2009, also in Cumbria, when 316.4 mm of rain fell in Seathwaite. The highest standard 0900 GMT – 0900 GMT rain day record, however, remains 279 mm at Martinstown, Dorset set on 18 July 1955. Much of the historical data is recorded in this way. The 48‑hour rainfall record was also beaten, with Thirlmere reporting 405 mm of rain falling up to 0800 GMT on 6 December 2015, compared to the previous record of 395.6 mm on 18–19 November 2009 at Seathwaite. Desmond created an atmospheric river in its wake, bringing in moist air from the Caribbean to the British Isles. As a result, rainfall from Desmond was unusually heavy, with the Norwegian Meteorological Institute designating Desmond an extreme weather event as a result of the amount of rain that fell.

The heavy rainfall caused a waterfall to appear at Malham Cove for a short period of time; this had not previously happened in living memory.

=== Cumbria and Lancashire floods ===
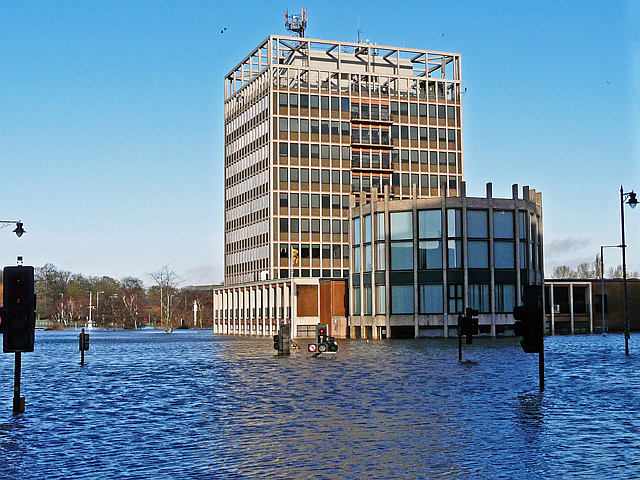
Carlisle Civic Centre in the floodwater, December 2015

Heavy rainfall from Desmond caused severe disruption. Appleby, Keswick and Kendal in the English county of Cumbria suffered blocked roads, collapsed bridges and some homes were evacuated; Cumbria Police declared the situation a "major incident". Many houses in Carlisle were flooded, and tens of thousands of properties in Lancaster lost power when a sub-station was flooded.

As a result of this event 3,500 properties were flooded in the UK, mostly in NW England, 2,000 of these in Carlisle. The village of Glenridding flooded for a second time on 9 December.

In the county three bridges were washed away, Coledale High Bridge in Braithwaite, the Fitz Footbridge in Keswick, and that at Pooley Bridge in the Eden District. Part of the A591 road an important north–south artery between Grasmere and Keswick in the Lake District, was washed away at Dunmail Raise with a landslip occurring adjacent to Thirlmere.

=== Ireland ===
In the Republic of Ireland, the worst affected areas were the province of Connacht and counties Donegal, Westmeath, Tipperary, Limerick, Clare, Cork and Kerry. Several, particularly local, roads were closed as a result of rivers breaching their banks and excess rainfall. In Connacht, the damage was worst in Athleague, Ballinasloe, Carrick-on-Shannon, Claregalway, Crossmolina, Foxford and Galway City. Millions of euros worth of damage was caused in Bandon, Fermoy, Kenmare and Tralee, while the Blackpool area of Cork City was severely affected by a high level of water flow in the River Lee. Heavy rain has also resulted in severe flooding in communities along the River Shannon, namely Athlone, Portumna, Shannon Harbour, Montpelier, Castleconnell, Clonlara, Parteen, Annacotty and Limerick City. The river breached its banks in Athlone on 9 December. Other areas affected due to heavy rainfall included Bray, Clonmel and Ennis. In Glaslough, County Monaghan, the dead body of a 70-year-old man was found when his car was believed to have become trapped in a dipped part of a flooded road.

=== Scotland, Northern Ireland, Wales and the Isle of Man ===
Approximately 1,000 people were evacuated from their homes in the town of Hawick in the Scottish Borders as a result of the River Teviot flooding. The River Nith burst its banks in Dumfries, flooding part of the town, with a major emergency being declared in Dumfries & Galloway as a result. Landslides and flooding closed some main roads in Scotland. Counties Down and Tyrone in Northern Ireland suffered road closures from fallen trees.

Further heavy rainfall exacerbated existing problems on the Isle of Man, which had been struck by localised flash flooding on 3 December, with warnings that Desmond could bring more flooding and more damage to the island.

In Wales, heavy rainfall led to flooding close to Llandygai, near Bangor in Gwynedd, with RNLI coastguard helicopters rescuing one person from their car. Flooding was also reported on Anglesey, in parts of Powys and in and around the South Wales city of Swansea. Wind damage was reported in Llandudno and winds gusted to 83 mph within the Snowdonia National Park.

== Storm Eva (24 December) ==
Eva was the fifth storm to be officially named by Met Éireann on 22 December 2015, with an orange wind warning being issued for counties Clare, Galway, Mayo, Sligo and Donegal. Gales were also expected in the northwest of the UK, with storm force winds over parts of the Outer Hebrides.

Rain associated with the passage of Eva caused further disruption when rivers burst their banks in the Cumbrian towns of Appleby, Keswick and Kendal on 22 December, with Appleby receiving three to four feet of flood water. The village of Glenridding was badly flooded for the third time in the month. 6000 houses in Ireland were left without power. Liz Truss convened a COBRA meeting to decide on emergency measures, which included the deployment of soldiers from the 2nd Battalion, Duke of Lancaster's Regiment to the affected areas. On 24 December, flood defence gates were closed in Carlisle, Keswick and Cockermouth to limit the damage of rainfall and 20 water pumps and two kilometres of temporary flood barriers were transported to northern England. Ferries operating between Dublin and Holyhead were cancelled due to bad weather on the Irish Sea.

== Christmas and Boxing Day rain ==
The Environment Agency issued seven severe flood warnings across Lancashire and 21 severe flood warnings across Yorkshire on 26 December.

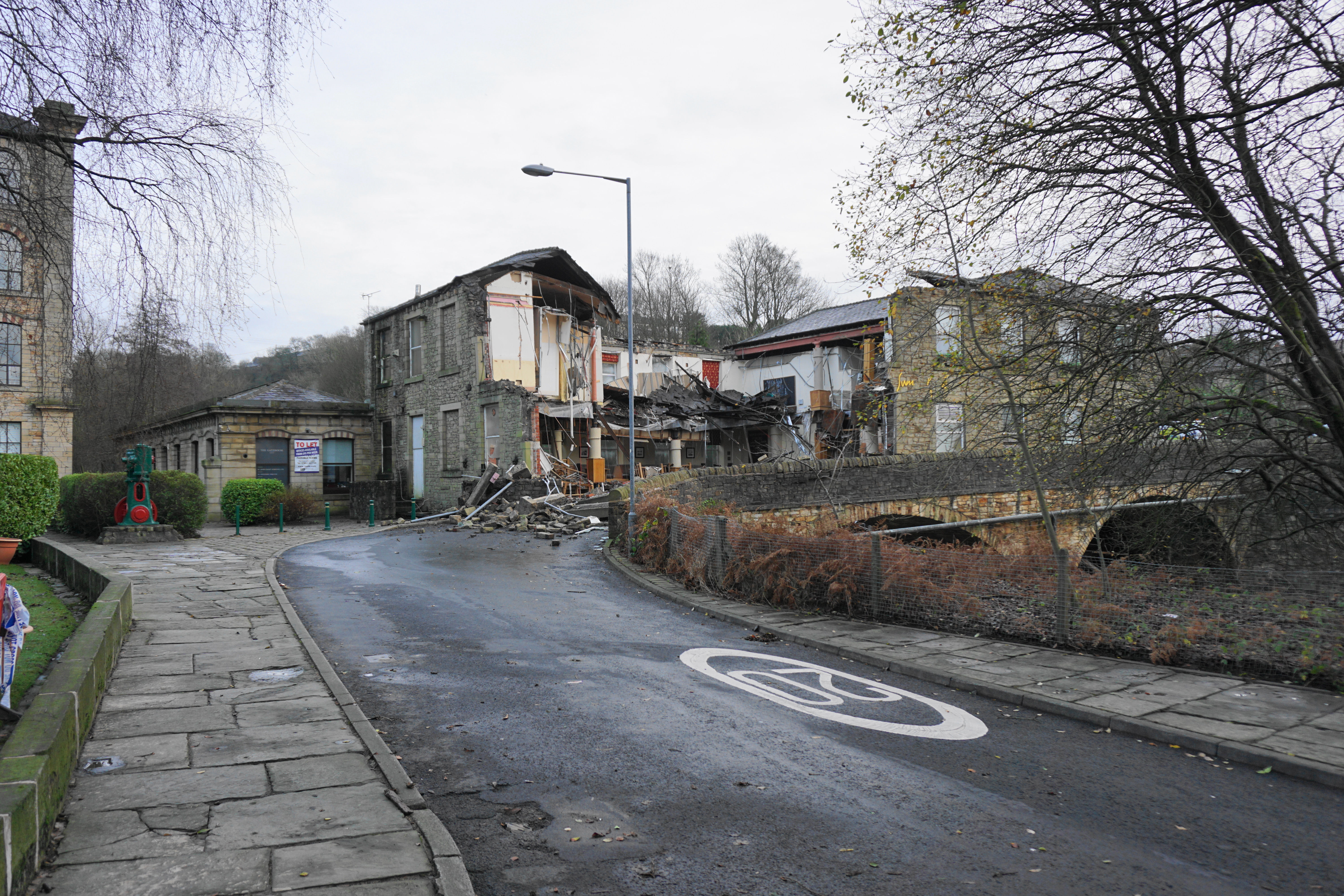
The Waterside, a public house in Summerseat that partially collapsed into the River Irwell on Boxing Day, photographed in the aftermath of the collapse

=== Northern England flooding ===
The worst of the flooding occurred on the night of Christmas Day and throughout Boxing Day across Lancashire and Yorkshire. On 26 December, homes were evacuated in Calder Valley, West Yorkshire, and in Ribchester and Whalley, Lancashire; according to the Environment Agency, every river in Lancashire peaked at their highest levels since records began.

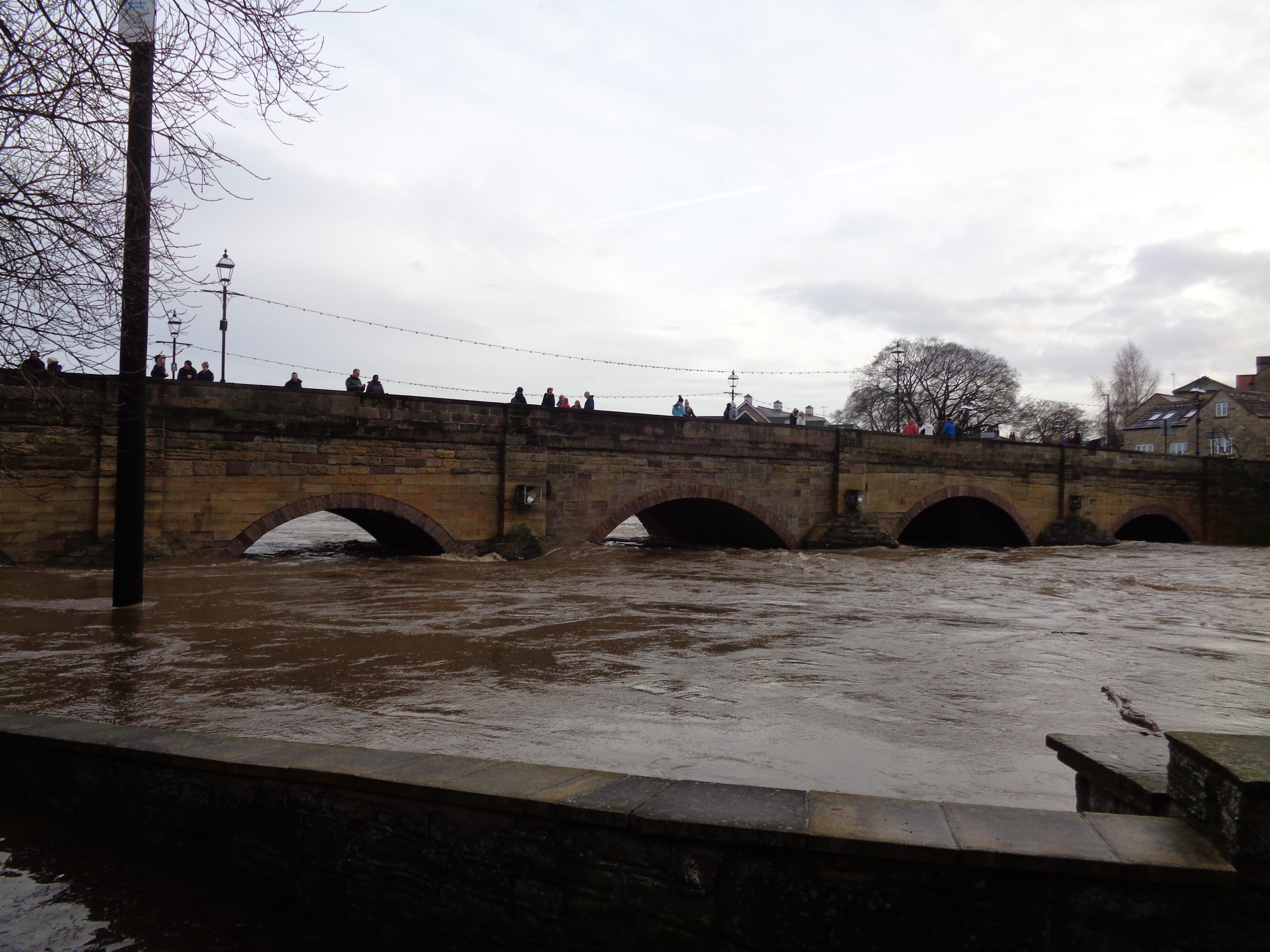
The River Wharfe risen to the height of the bridge at Wetherby, West Yorkshire.

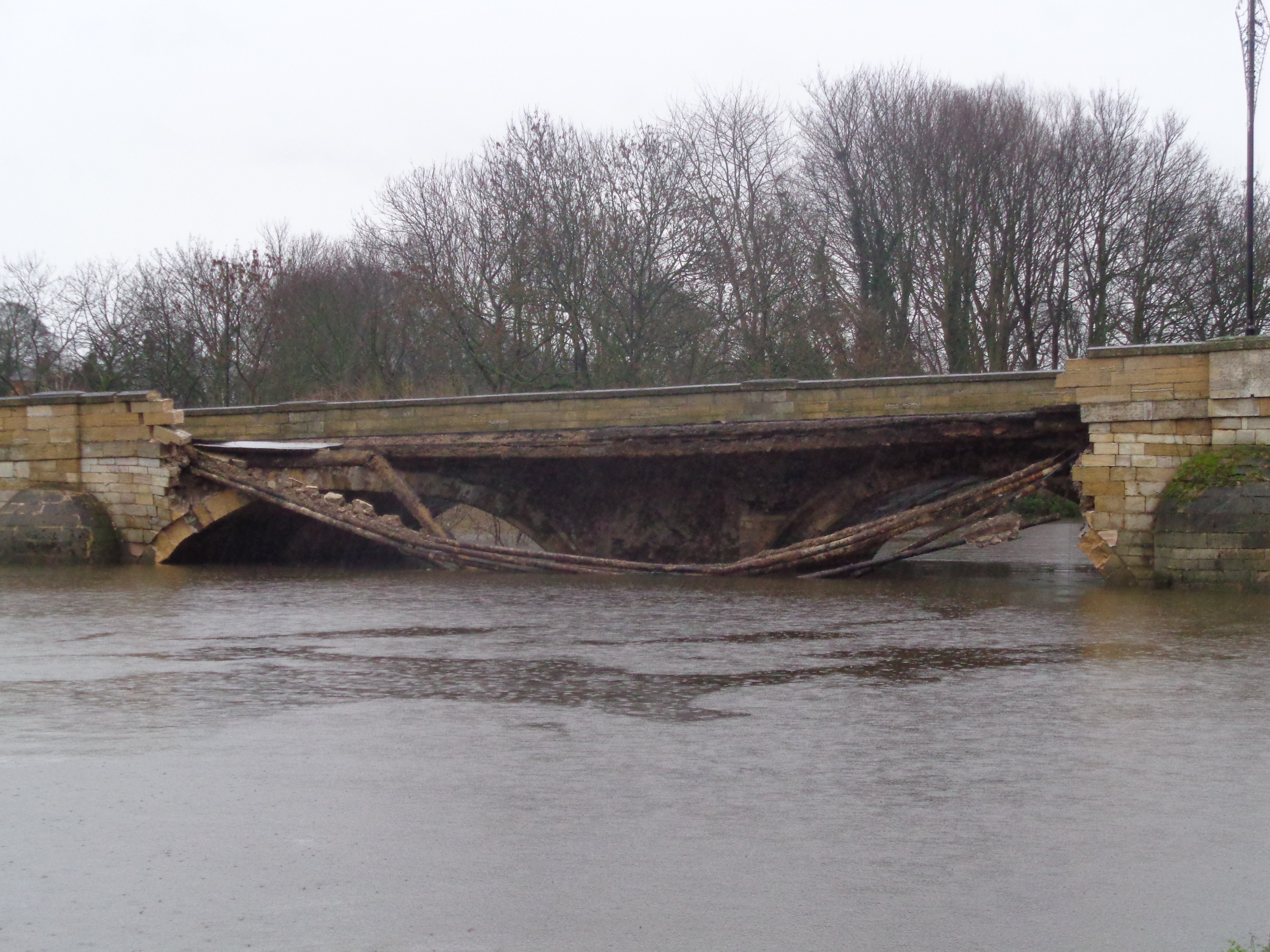
Partially collapsed Tadcaster Bridge (30 December 2015)

Flooding caused at least two explosions in Radcliffe, Greater Manchester, as gas mains were ruptured. One explosion and subsequent fire occurred as a result of a footbridge being swept away by the River Irwell, with footage of the incident being widely shared on social media. Floodwater also entered an electricity sub station in Hebden Bridge producing a fire.

In Summerseat, Greater Manchester, a historic 200-year-old pub on a bridge over the River Irwell close to the East Lancashire Railway partially collapsed into the river as it burst its banks on 26 December. The Irwell also burst its banks downstream in Manchester city centre.

Around 3,000 homes were left without power in North and West Yorkshire on 26 December as a result of an electricity substation being flooded. Most of the power outages occurred in the Calder Valley and around Bingley and Skipton, with substation owners Northern Powergrid stating that their engineers cannot safely reach the substations to assess the damage due to rising floodwaters.

Many parts of Mirfield flooded affecting local businesses The Ship Inn, Mill Carpets and Furniture And Choice who lost 10% of their stock to flood damage.

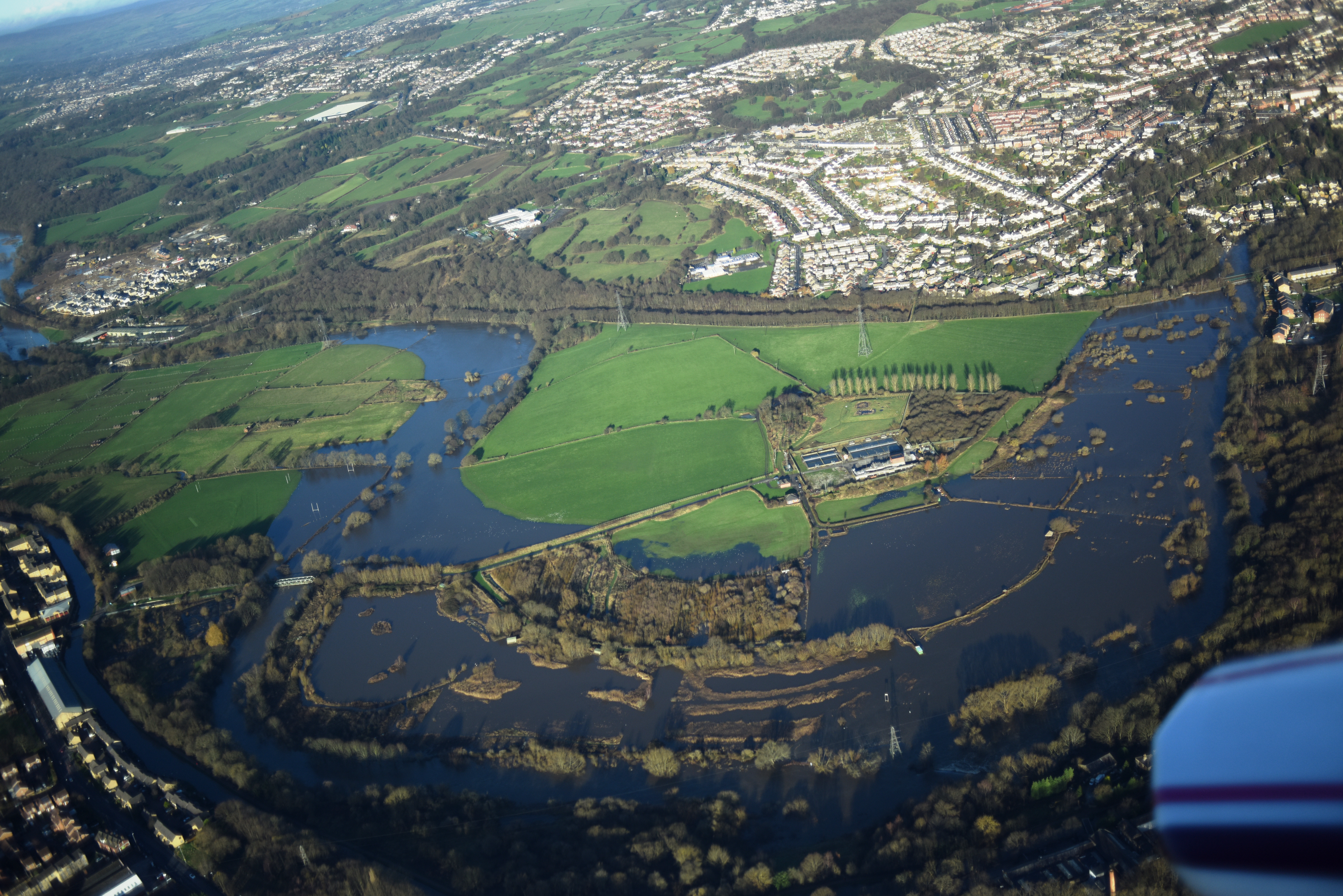
The River Aire at Farsley on 27 December.

In Leeds the River Aire flooded over its banks causing flooding in the Kirkstall Road area of the city, blocking a main route into the city.

A total of 7,574 homes across the north of England were without power by 08:00 on 27 December. Around 5,500 of these homes without power were located in the town of Rochdale in Greater Manchester, where a major electricity substation was flooded. As a result of power outages in Rochdale, electricity customers were told to limit their electricity usage to prevent further blackouts, for example by switching off their Christmas lights. Electricity provider Electricity North West warned that some homes may be without power until 28 December.

In York, the Environment Agency were forced to open the Foss Barrier which has protected the city centre since 1987, as the control room had become flooded and the pumps were in danger of failing. To prevent the River Foss backing up and causing flooding, the Agency raised the barrier, allowing the flood waters from the River Ouse to move up the Foss. The action caused some 600 households in the city to flood whereas the Environment agency estimated 1800 homes would have flooded were the barrier not lifted. The BT telephone exchange flooded, cutting landline and wi-fi broadband services for thousands of York customers and the loss of emergency-call service for Hull for around four hours. KCOM was later fined £900,000 by regulator Ofcom.

On 29 December part of Tadcaster Bridge in North Yorkshire collapsed due to flooding, having been closed since 27 December due to fears it had been structurally compromised.

==== Sport ====
Heavy rainfall overnight on 25 and 26 December led to the cancellation of dozens of Boxing Day football fixtures. In the Scottish Premiership, waterlogged pitches led to the postponement of fixtures between Dundee United and Motherwell and between Partick Thistle and St Johnstone. In addition, one Scottish Championship fixture, one Scottish League One fixture and one Scottish League Two fixture were also postponed due to Eva.

Additionally, in England, the Championship fixture between Blackburn Rovers and Middlesbrough was postponed, as were five fixtures in League One, three fixtures in League Two and three fixtures in the National League. In horseracing, the meeting due to be held on 26 December at Wetherby Racecourse was cancelled owing to flooding.

==== Transport ====
===== Road =====
The Lancashire Fire and Rescue Service and North Wales Police warned motorists not to travel unless absolutely necessary, with heavy rainfall and high winds leading to widespread road closures. The M62 motorway was closed westbound between junctions 20 (for Rochdale) and 19 (for Middleton) after heavy rainfall caused a large sinkhole to appear across the carriageway. The Tadcaster Bridge over the River Wharfe at Tadcaster, North Yorkshire collapsed on 29 December. The bridge over the Wharfe between Collingham and Linton was also closed after a partial collapse.

===== Rail =====
First TransPennine Express and Northern Rail both warned passengers not to travel on 27 December. Flooding on railway lines across West Yorkshire, particularly around Leeds, resulted in the suspension of all services between Leeds and Bradford Forster Square, Carlisle, Harrogate, Ilkley, Manchester Victoria, Morecambe, Skipton and York. A landslide at Chorley resulted in the suspension of services between Manchester, Bolton and Preston, while another landslide at Haydon Bridge resulted in the suspension of Newcastle to Carlisle services. Disruption was also reported on services between Wigan Wallgate and Bolton and between Carlisle and Whitehaven as a result of flooding on 27 December.

==== Response ====
===== Domestic =====
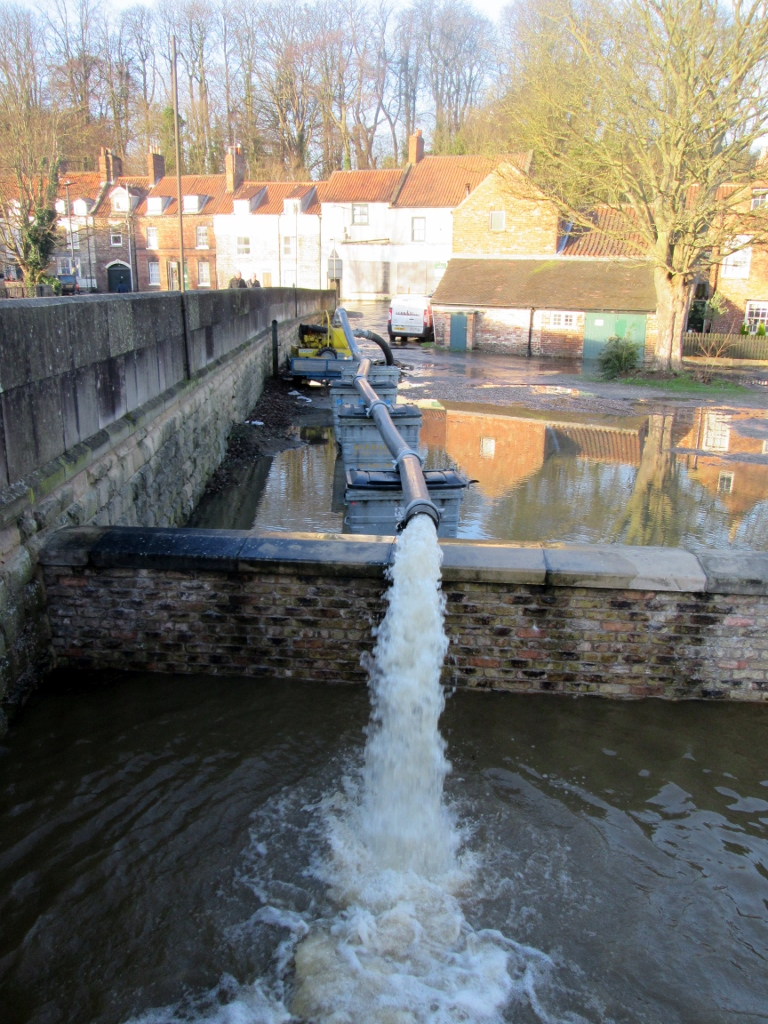
Floodwater is pumped back into the retreating River Derwent at Malton on 27 December.

Prime Minister David Cameron issued a statement on 27 December after chairing an emergency COBRA crisis meeting on Storm Eva, describing the floods as "unprecedented" and "incredibly serious" and pledging help to those affected by sending out more troops to help with the defence and clearup of the floods. The Times reported that senior politicians regarded the floods as being the result of extreme weather caused by climate change.

Labour Shadow Environment Secretary Kerry McCarthy criticised the government for cutting spending on flood defences, stating that as "unprecedented" weather events become more common, spending on flood defences should be increased.

British astronaut Tim Peake tweeted an image from the ISS expressing concern for flood victims.

===== International =====
- Malta – President Marie Louise Coleiro Preca wrote to Queen Elizabeth II expressing solidarity with the flood victims.

== Storm Frank (29 December) ==
The Met Office announced the trailing weather front of the storm named Frank would likely cause further disruption.

Amber 'be prepared' rainfall warnings were in force, resulting in severe flood warnings in England and Scotland, meaning "danger to life".

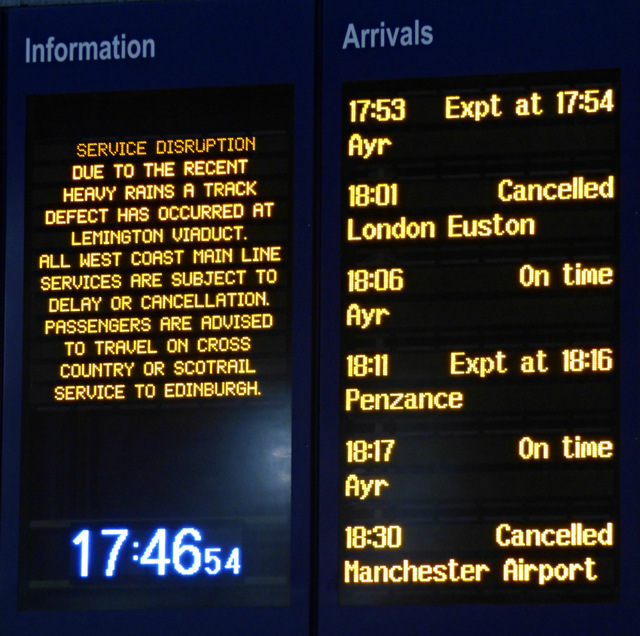
Service disruption notice Glasgow Central railway station 31 December 2015

Frank caused severe flooding in Scotland with the towns of Dumfries, Peebles and Ballater flooded by the rivers Nith, Tweed and Dee. Abergeldie Castle was left on the brink of serious damage after flooding eroded the banks of the Dee within feet of the foundations. On 4 January, Network Rail announced the West Coast Main Line between Carlisle and Glasgow would be closed until 1 February, with passengers either diverted through Dumfries or transferred to coaches due to significant damage to the Lamington Viaduct.

Part of Birnbeck Pier at Weston-super-Mare, North Somerset, collapsed during storms on 30 December 2015. Elland bridge in Calderdale West Yorkshire partially collapsed on 29 December.

== January 2016 ==
In early January heavy rain was primarily affecting eastern Scotland and north east England. The Met Office issued amber warnings for Moray, Aberdeenshire, Angus, Perthshire and Stirlingshire on 4 January. Flooding was reported to have almost cut off the town of Whitby on 4 January.

On the night of 7 January, Aberdeenshire Council reported an escalating emergency response due to flooding. At first, this was confined to rivers Dee and Ythan, but later, on 8 January, had focused around flooding around Coulter, South Lanarkshire. Up to 70 properties were evacuated in total and the impacts of the storm caused disruption to rail, road, air travel, power cuts and school closures. Flooding, freezing temperature and snow reduced the ability for services to rescue and safely contain people. The River Don reached its highest water levels for 45 years. The River Ythan broke its all-time record level in one location. Scotland's first minister Nicola Sturgeon described the impacts as "devastating" and Richard Brown, head of hydrology for Sepa, described the Don's water levels as "pretty exceptional".

== Aftermath ==
In response to the flooding, there has been criticism of the way in which flood risk is communicated to the public, as return periods of a 1 in 100 year flooding could be misleading, as a 1 in 100 year event means a 1% chance of one occurring in any given year, not that it is expected to happen once every hundred years. The dynamic nature of the underlying climate conditions behind such assumptions has also been questioned, with the Environment Agency stating that a "complete rethink" of the UK's flood defences is needed.

== In popular culture ==
The floods are the topic of Clare Shaw's poetry collection Flood (2018).
