= Eamonson =

This is an unusual surname that was more or less restricted to West Riding of Yorkshire until the late 19th century (Find My Past). All living people with this surname are descended from Samuel Eamonson, who was born in approx. 1788 in Wakefield and died in 1867. He married Ann Kirk (1791–1884). Among their seven (or more), children, their sons Joseph Eamonson (1823–1870) and James Eamonson (1828–1899) were the only ones to pass on the surname Eamonson to the next generation. Joseph and James were both born in Wakefield and became stonemasons. Study of this family thus constitutes a one-name study.

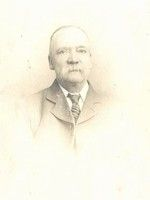

== Earlier Eamonsons ==
The family was somewhat larger in the 17th and 18th centuries, but was focused around Whitkirk, Roundhay and Seacroft, to the east of Leeds. There is a published genealogy of the family in Records of the Parish of Whitkirk, which goes back to the early 1600s.

== Famous family members ==
- Mary Rosse, Countess of Rosse (née Field) (1813–1885) was an early pioneer of photography and an astronomer. She was the daughter of John Wilmer Field and Ann Wharton Myddleton. Her paternal grandparents were Joshua Field (1742–1819) and Mary Wilmer. Joshua's parents were John Field of Heaton and his wife Mary Eamonson.
- Benjamin Eamonson was Vicar of Collingham for 29 years - see Wikipedia entry for St Oswald's Church, Collingham.
