= Weardley =

Village in West Yorkshire, England

Coordinates: 53.903°N 1.538°W

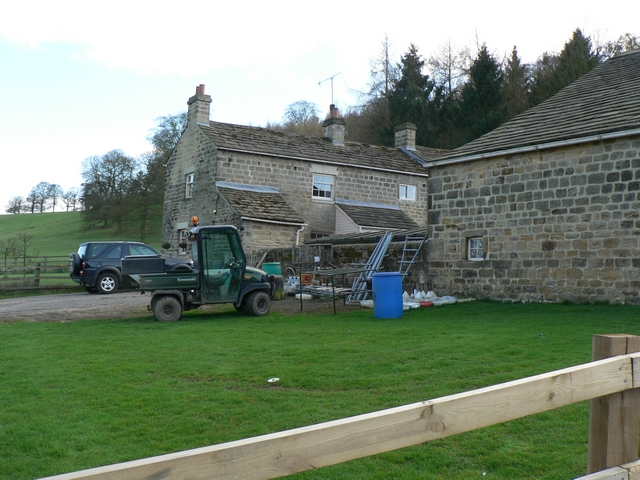
- Carr House, Weardley

- Location within West Yorkshire
- Civil parish: Harewood
- Metropolitan borough: Leeds
- Metropolitan county: West Yorkshire
- Region: Yorkshire and the Humber
- Country: England
- Sovereign state: United Kingdom

Weardley is a village on the Harewood Estate in the parish of Harewood, at the northern edge of the City of Leeds metropolitan borough, West Yorkshire, England. The village is in the Harewood ward of the City of Leeds Metropolitan Council.

== History ==
In 1870–1872, John Marius Wilson wrote that Weardley was a village of 1080 acres. Property was worth £1337, including quarries worth £150. The population of 171 people occupied 38 houses. In 1931 the parish had a population of 94.

Weardley was formerly a township in the parish of Harewood. From 1866 Weardley was a civil parish, but on 1 April 1937 the parish was abolished and merged with Harewood.

Weardley's former chapel is now in residential use.
