= St George's Church of England School =

Location
- Meadow Road; Gravesend, Kent, DA11 7LS; England
- Coordinates: 51.4284°N 0.3614°E

Information
- Type: Academy
- Religious affiliation: Church of England
- Established: 1580; 446 years ago
- Department for Education URN: 137609 Tables
- Ofsted: Reports
- Headteacher: Steve Carey
- Gender: Mixed
- Age: 4 to 18
- Enrolment: 1234 as of October 2021
- Website: https://www.saintgeorgescofe.kent.sch.uk/

St George's Church of England School is a mixed all-through school and sixth form located in Gravesend in the English county of Kent.

== History ==
The school was founded in 1580, and is administered by the Church of England Diocese of Rochester. The school was converted to academy status in November 2011, and was previously a voluntary aided school under the control of Kent County Council. The school continues to coordinate with Kent County Council for admissions.

== Curriculum ==
St George's Church of England School offers GCSEs, BTECs and OCR Nationals as programmes of study for pupils, while students in the sixth form have the option to study from a range of A Levels and further BTECs.

== Alumni ==
St George's was the school of Alec Shelbrooke, Member of Parliament for Elmet and Rothwell and Marc Guéhi.
