= Listed buildings in Collingham, West Yorkshire =

Collingham is a civil parish in the metropolitan borough of the City of Leeds, West Yorkshire, England. It contains eight listed buildings that are recorded in the National Heritage List for England. Of these, one is listed at Grade II*, the middle of the three grades, and the others are at Grade II, the lowest grade. The parish contains the villages of Collingham and Linton, and the surrounding countryside. The listed buildings consist of a church, two farmhouses, a barn, an outbuilding, two bridges, and a milestone.

== Key ==
Grade	Criteria
II*	Particularly important buildings of more than special interest
II	Buildings of national importance and special interest

== Buildings ==
Name and location	Photograph	Date	Notes	Grade
St Oswald's Church; 53.90955°N 1.40768°W		15th century	The church, which retains some Anglo-Saxon material, has been subsequently altered, and it was restored in 1840–41. It is built in stone, the roof of the chancel is tiled, and the rest of the roof is in stone slate. The church consists of a nave, a north aisle, a south porch, a chancel with a north chapel, and a west tower. The tower is Perpendicular in style, and the rest of the church is Early English. The tower has two stages, a chamfered plinth, a three-light west window, a clock face on the south, two-light bell windows, and an embattled parapet with gargoyles and crocketed pinnacles. The windows in the body of the church are lancets, and at the east end is a triple lancet.	II*
Manor House Barn; 53.90950°N 1.40969°W		Mid 16th century	The barn has a timber framed core, and was later encased in stone, with some brick later. It has a roof of Welsh blue slate, four bays, a continuous south aisle, and an aisle to the north of the first bay. In the north front is a tall cart entry.	II
Northgate Farmhouse; 53.91616°N 1.40782°W	—	Mid 16th century	The farmhouse, originally timber framed, was refronted in about 1800 with yellow sandstone on the front, and red sandstone on the sides and rear. The roof is partly in stone slate and partly in pantiles. There are two storeys, a front of four bays, and two rear wings with quoins. The doorway has a fanlight, and the windows have been converted into casements.	II
Square outbuilding 53.92062°N 1.40625°W	—	Mid 18th century	The building is in a garden and has been moved from another site. It is in stone with vermiculated rusticated quoins, an impost band, a moulded cornice, a blocking course, and a pyramidal green slate roof with corner ball finials and surmounted by an urn. On each face is a recessed arch with voussoirs, and carving in the tympanum. In one face is a doorway with monolithic jambs, and the other faces contain windows with deep aprons.	II
Collingham Bridge; 53.90834°N 1.41298°W		c. 1790	The bridge carries Harewood Road (A659 road) over Collingham Beck. It is in stone and consists of a single segmental arch. The bridge has elongated rusticated voussoirs, a band, a dropped keystone, and a rusticated coped parapet, and the abutments end in projecting square piers.	II
Compton Grove Farmhouse; 53.89850°N 1.40112°W		Early 19th century	The farmhouse is in stone with a stone slate roof, two storeys, and a symmetrical front of three bays. The central doorway has a flat head, a fanlight and voussoirs, and the windows are sashes with flat heads and projecting sills.	II
Linton Bridge; 53.91269°N 1.40990°W		Early to mid 19th century	The bridge carries Linton Road over the River Wharfe. It is in stone, with brick to the intrados of the arches, and consists of three basket arches. The bridge has rusticated voussoirs, rounded cutwaters, a band, and a parapet ending in square piers.	II
Milestone; 53.90779°N 1.41858°W		Mid 19th century	The milestone is in front of 8 Langwith Mews, on the south side of Harewood Road (A659 road). It is in stone, overlaid in cast iron, and has a triangular section and a rounded top. The top is inscribed with "TADCASTER & OTLEY ROAD" and "COLLINGHAM", and on the lower faces are the distances to Harewood, Wetherby, Otley, Boston Spa, and Tadcaster.	II
