= Collingham, West Yorkshire =

Village and civil parish in West Yorkshire, England

Coordinates: 53.908°N 1.412°W

Collingham
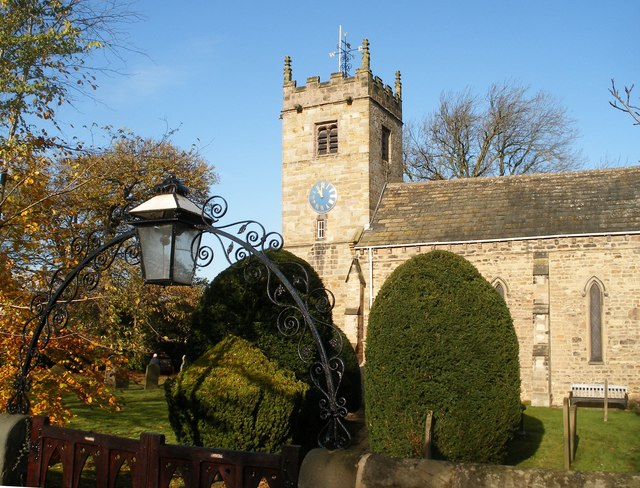
- St Oswald's Church

- Location within West Yorkshire
- Population: 2,991 (2011 census)
- OS grid reference: SE3845
- Civil parish: Collingham
- Metropolitan borough: City of Leeds
- Metropolitan county: West Yorkshire
- Region: Yorkshire and the Humber
- Country: England
- Sovereign state: United Kingdom
- Post town: WETHERBY
- Postcode district: LS22
- Dialling code: 01937
- Police: West Yorkshire
- Fire: West Yorkshire
- Ambulance: Yorkshire
- UK Parliament: Wetherby and Easingwold

Collingham is a village and civil parish 2 miles (3 km) south-west of Wetherby in West Yorkshire, England. It is in the City of Leeds metropolitan borough. The population of the civil parish as of the 2011 census was 2,991.

It sits in the Harewood ward of Leeds City Council and Wetherby and Easingwold parliamentary constituency.

The River Wharfe runs through the village towards Wetherby, as does the main A58 trans-Pennine road. The A659 passes through the village. The River Wharfe is dangerous at Collingham due to undercurrents, which are prevalent around Linton Bridge and the former viaduct. Collingham Beck burst its banks in 2007, causing extensive flooding.

The village public house, known as Cromwells, is said to be where Oliver Cromwell spent the night after the Battle of Marston Moor. The clergyman, the Reverend William Mompesson was born there in 1639.

== Geography ==
The village is at the junction of the A58 and A659 roads. It is separated from Linton to the north by the River Wharfe and linked to it via Linton Bridge. Wetherby to the north east is accessed via Linton or the A58 road from Leeds. The A659 road to Harewood crosses the Collingham Beck, a tributary of the Wharfe, over the listed Collingham Bridge. To the east is access to the A1(M) motorway and Boston Spa.

Collingham has had problems with flooding and was affected by the 2007 UK Floods. Collingham Beck has a tendency to swell very quickly. During the 2007 UK Floods it flooded Millbeck Green and the A58 Leeds Road reaching the boundaries of the Half Moon and Old Star public houses.

Shortly after 18:00 (BST) 26 December 2015, the monitoring station at Collingham for the River Wharfe reached a record high of 5.25 metres (17.2 ft) above ordnance datum (previous high level was 4.7 metres [15 ft] AOD). Linton Bridge was damaged in the flood cracks appeared in the deck and its parapets sagged. The grade II listed bridge was closed to all traffic for repairs until September 2017. The time and the £5 million cost of the project was due to the fact that the ground underneath the piers had shifted the bridge.

== Etymology ==
The name of Collingham is first attested in 1166, with spellings including the present one alongside Collyngham. The name comes from Old English. The first element is the personal name Cola (which originated as a nickname deriving from Old English col 'coal', referring to black hair or dark complexion), and the second the suffix -ingas denoting a group of associated people. Thus the Colingas were a group descended from or otherwise associated with someone called Cola. This group name was then compounded with the Old English word hām ('settlement, homestead'). Thus the name once meant 'the settlement of the descendants of Cola'.

The parish and township of Collingham also once included the village of Compton, whose name is first attested in the Domesday Book of 1086, as Contone. This name comes from the Old English words cumb ('valley') and tūn ('estate, farmstead'), and thus once meant 'farmstead of the valley'.

== Transport ==
Collingham Bridge railway station was on the Cross Gates to Wetherby Line. It was named after the bridge over the nearby beck to avoid confusion with Collingham railway station in Nottinghamshire and was the station before Wetherby railway station. The railway bridge over the River Wharfe, which was adjacent to Linton Bridge was demolished in 1965 when the railway was dismantled. Collingham is served by the X98 and X99 bus services operated by First West Yorkshire between Leeds City Square and Wetherby Deighton Bar.

== Amenities ==
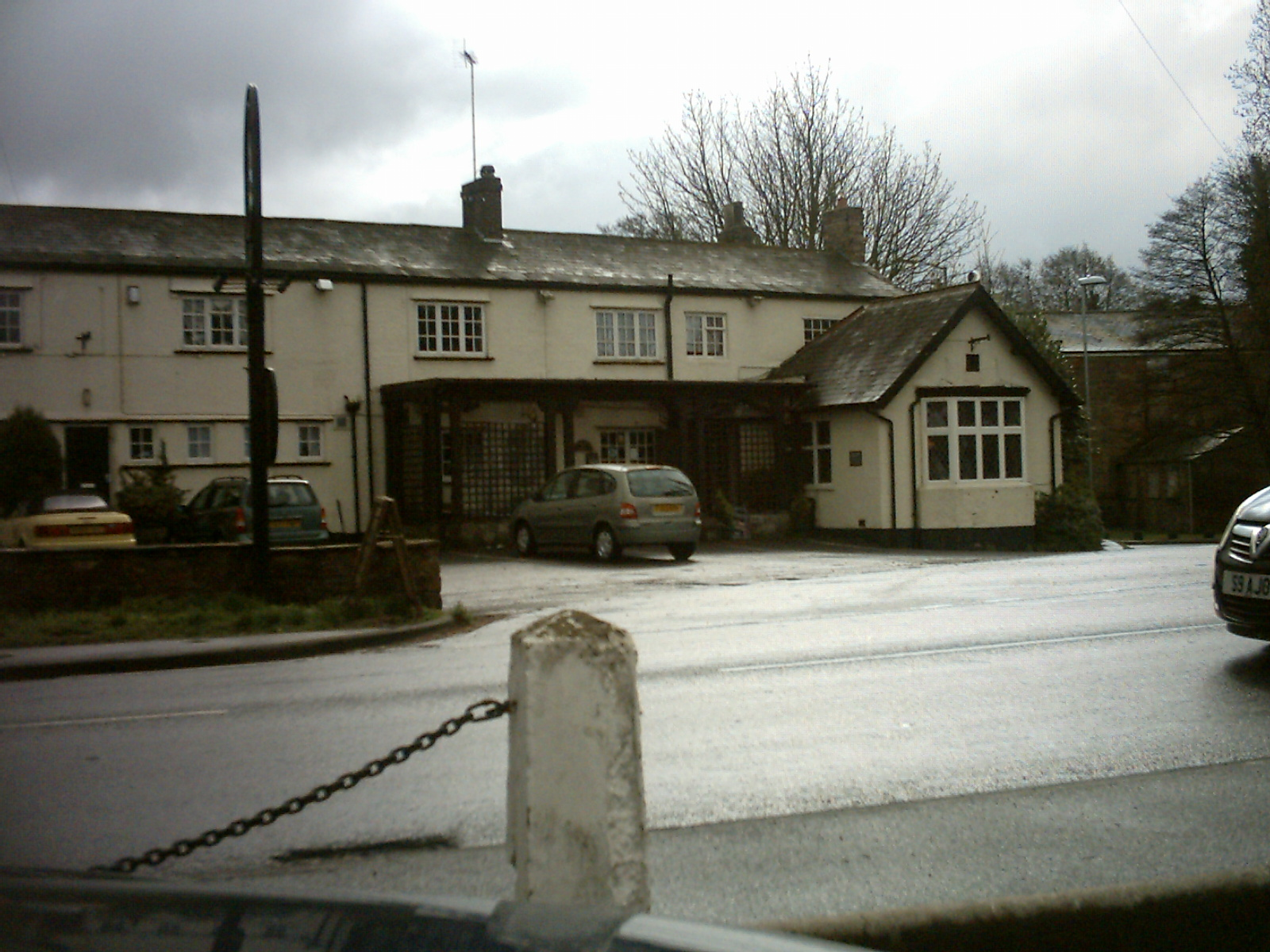
Old Star pub (now Tesco Express)

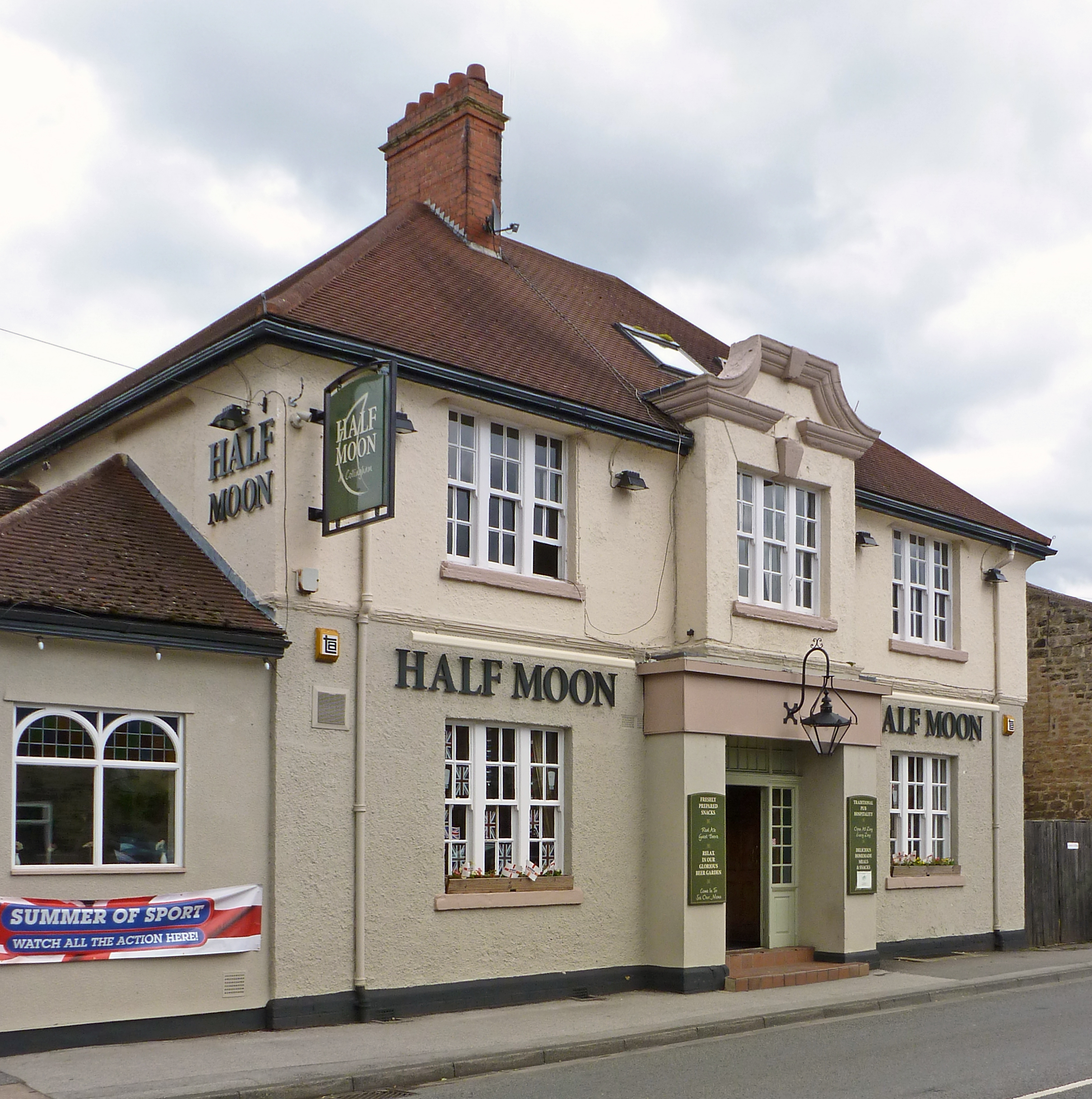
Half Moon pub

The village has a public house, Cromwell's (previously The Half Moon) on Harewood Road, and an Italian restaurant, Picolino on High Street. The former Old Star pub and restaurant is now a Tesco Express.

Hastings Court and Elizabeth Court, are small modern shopping precincts, house most of the village shops, a barbers shop, a hairdressers, an off licence, fish and chip shop, travel agency, pharmacy, delicatessen, an opticians, a pet shop, a beauticians, a dentist and a dry cleaner. Adjacent is a small parade of shops containing a takeaway and the post office. The GP surgery provides NHS services.

Lady Elizabeth Hastings Church of England Primary School is located off the Harewood Road opposite the cricket pitch.

== Religion ==
St Oswald's Church is the Anglican parish church, and there is a Methodist chapel. The nearest Catholic church is St Joseph's in Wetherby.

== Housing and buildings ==
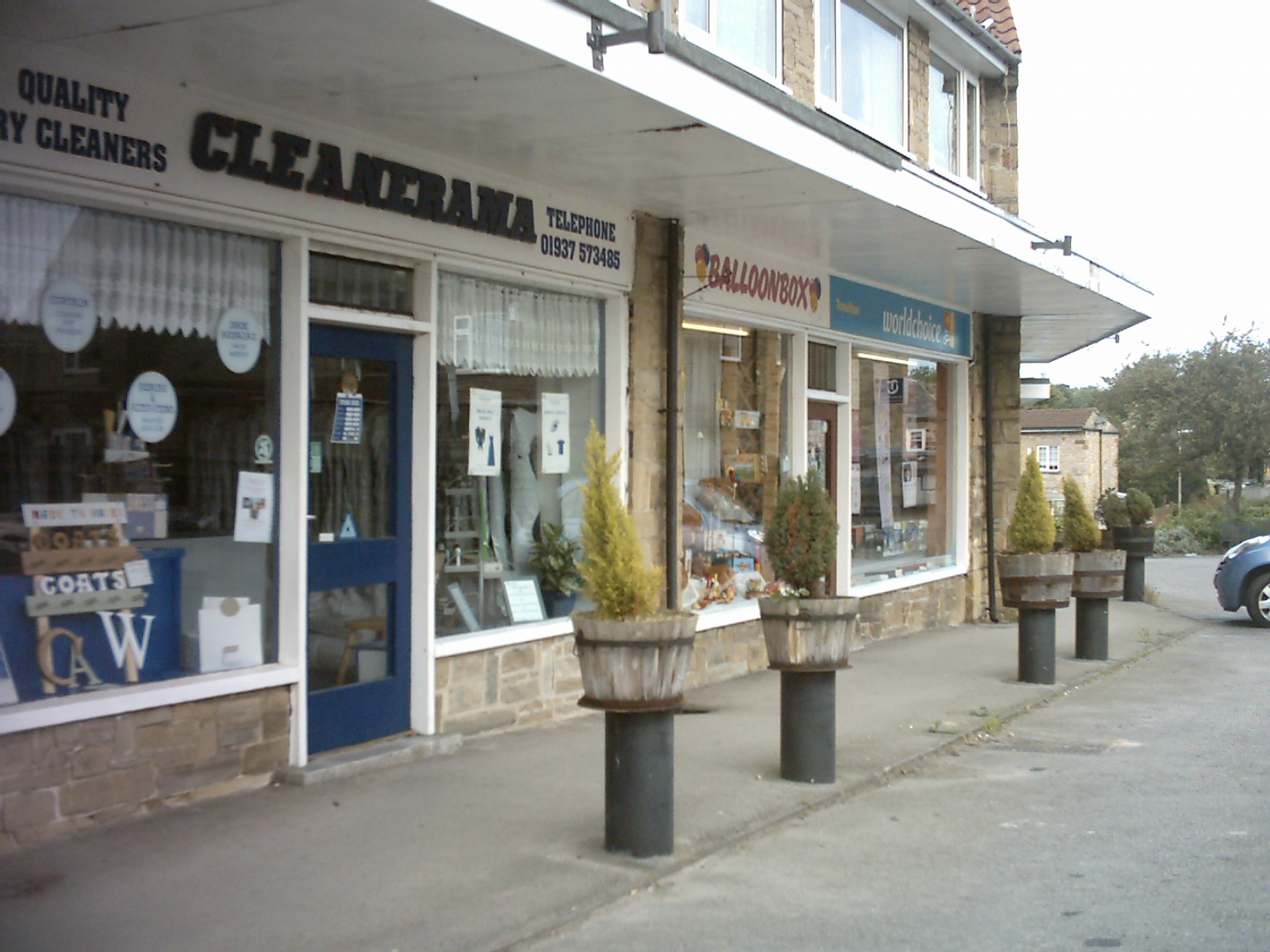
Elizabeth Court

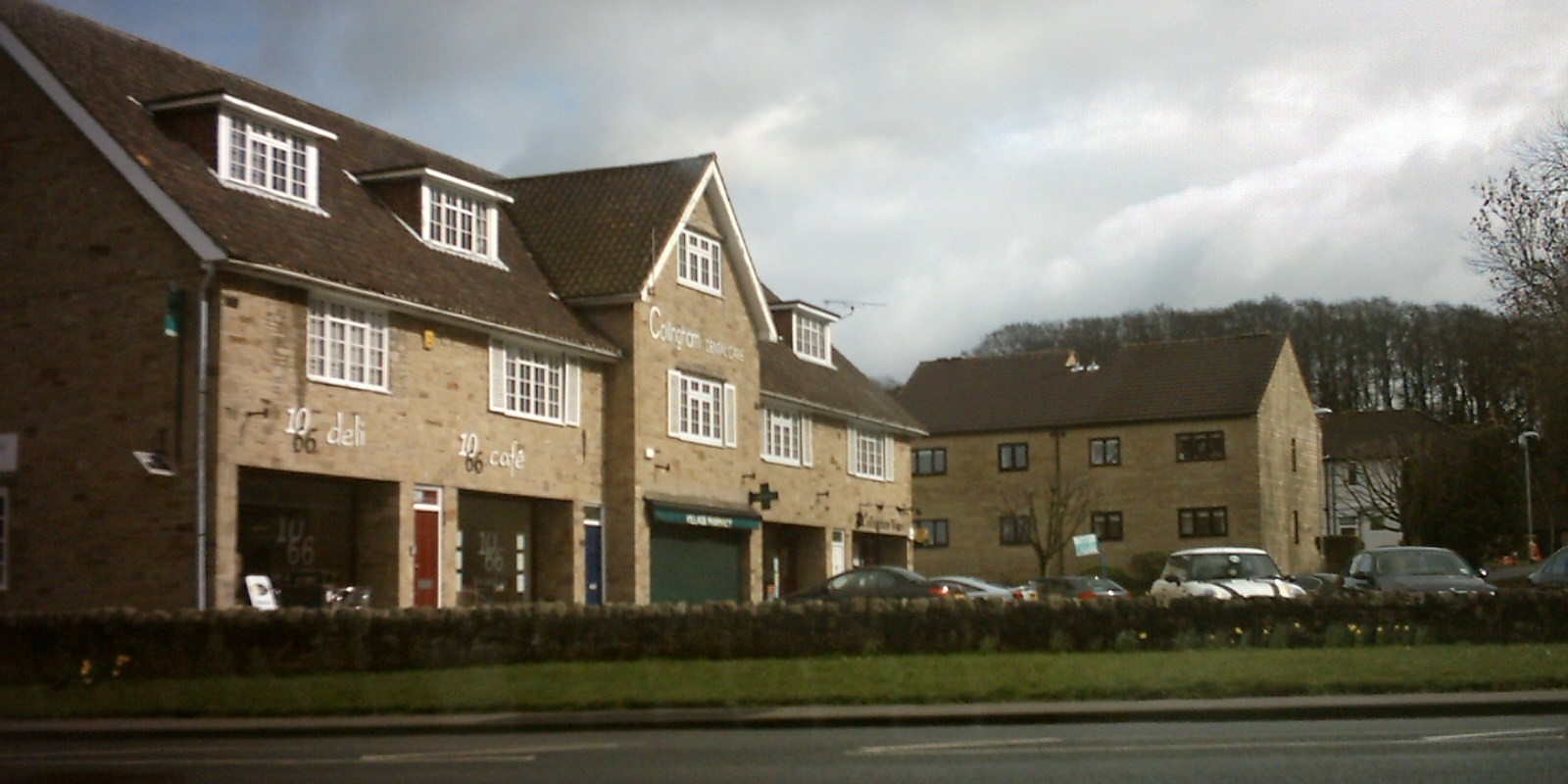
Hastings Court

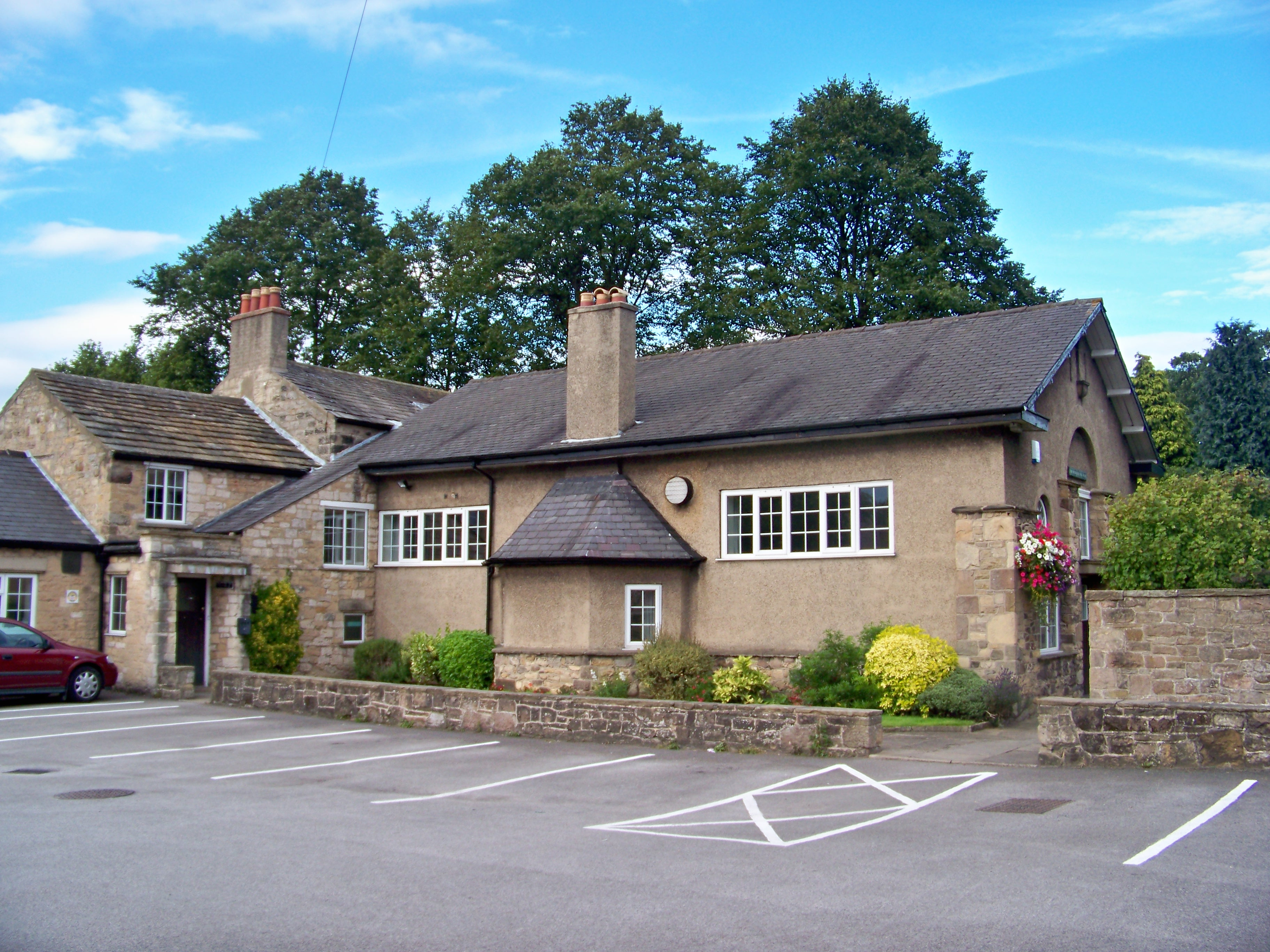
Collingham Memorial Hall

Much of the centre of Collingham was demolished in the 1960s and 1970s and replaced with modern facilities. However the Elizabeth Court Shopping Precinct in Collingham is stone-built and sympathetically styled. As part of this, many small shops and cottages were demolished, changing the character of the village. Some small cottages were purchased by the Half Moon public house, demolished and are now a large car park. The village has two churches. A large, stone Anglican church and a small, red brick Methodist chapel. There is a 1960s-built primary school, a 1970s-built indoor squash courts.

It also includes the "Old Mill" built in stone which was first mentioned in the Domesday Book.

There is an eclectic mix of Georgian, Victorian and 20th century housing. Housing around Harewood Road is generally late 20th century housing with some large detached houses. Housing around Leeds Road is a mix of individually built properties and housing developments, while housing on Wetherby Road is generally the oldest in Collingham. There has been no housing development on a notable scale in Collingham, since Bryant Homes built housing along Linton Road.

== Sport ==
Collingham is home to Collingham and Linton Cricket Club which plays in the Airedale-Wharfedale Senior Cricket League. This is located at the Collingham and Linton Sports Association (CALSA), which boasts three indoor squash courts, a football pitch and a cricket pitch. CALSA also has affiliated tennis and hockey sections.

Wetherby Golf Club extends all the way to the river at Collingham.

== Governance ==
Collingham falls into the Harewood ward of Leeds City Council and Elmet and Rothwell constituency, which is currently held by Alec Shelbrooke (Conservative).

The village lies within the 'Parish Council of Collingham and Linton', which is under the governance of Leeds City Council. The nearest council offices are in Wetherby. Collingham was until 1974 in the Wetherby Rural District, it is now in the Harewood Ward of the City of Leeds.

== People ==
Collingham was home to Percy Shaw, a professional boxer between 1932 and 1935. He had 11 professional contests during this time.

== Nearby settlements ==
- Wetherby
- Micklethwaite
- Boston Spa
- Bardsey
- Scarcroft
- Harewood
- Linton
- East Keswick
- Compton

== See also ==
- Listed buildings in Collingham, West Yorkshire
