= Harewood, West Yorkshire =

Village and civil parish in West Yorkshire, England

Coordinates: 53.90°N 1.51°W

Harewood
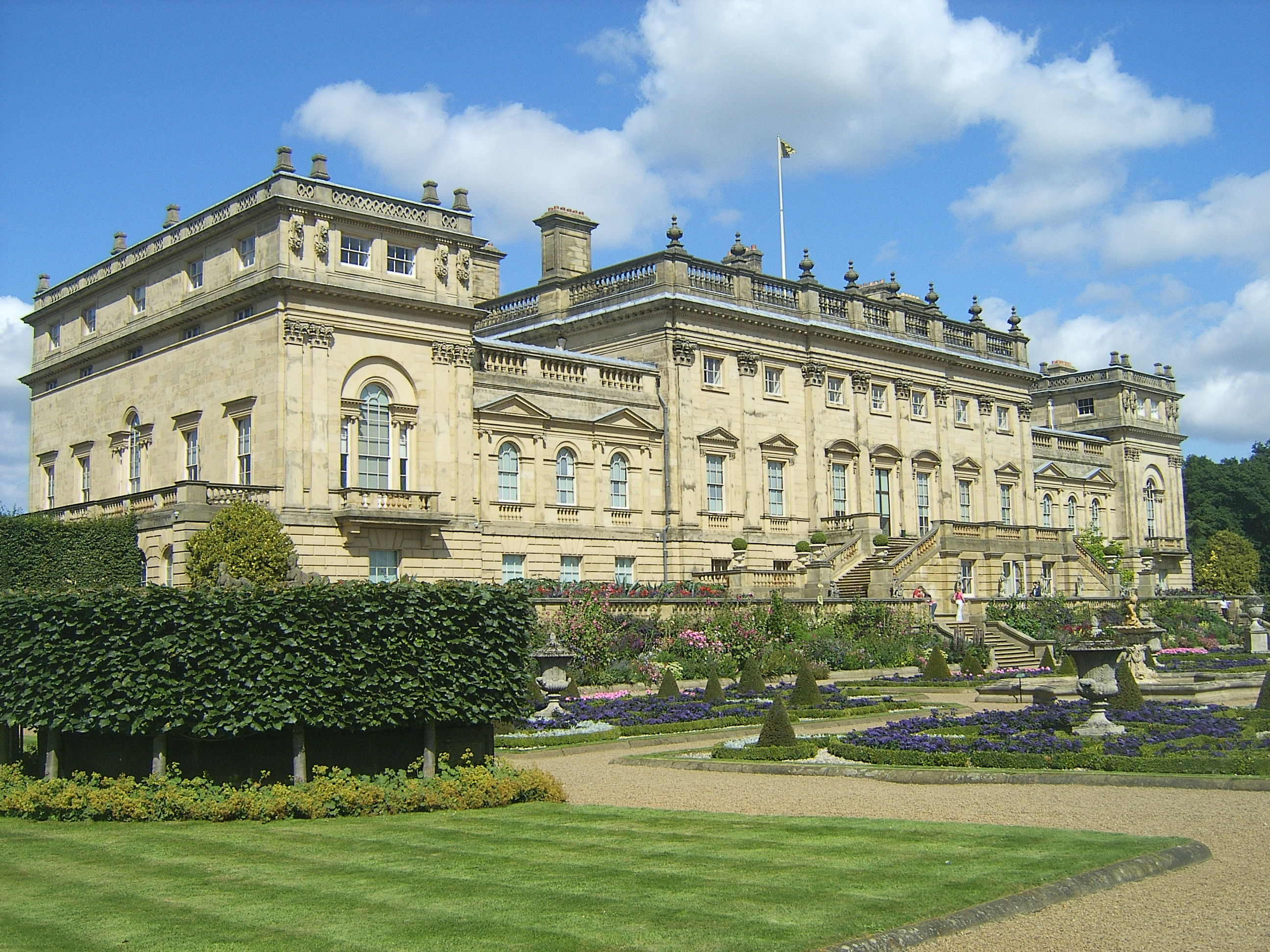
- Harewood House

- Location within West Yorkshire
- Population: 3,734 (2011 census)
- OS grid reference: SE321449
- Civil parish: Harewood
- Metropolitan borough: City of Leeds
- Metropolitan county: West Yorkshire
- Region: Yorkshire and the Humber
- Country: England
- Sovereign state: United Kingdom
- Post town: LEEDS
- Postcode district: LS17
- Dialling code: 0113
- Police: West Yorkshire
- Fire: West Yorkshire
- Ambulance: Yorkshire
- UK Parliament: Wetherby and Easingwold

Harewood (/ˈhɛərwʊd/ HAIR-wuud) is a village, civil parish, former manor and ecclesiastical parish, in West Yorkshire, England, today in the metropolitan borough of the City of Leeds. The civil parish population at the 2011 census was 3,734.

== Toponymy ==
The name of Harewood is first attested in the tenth-century Rushworth Gospels manuscript, in the form æt Harawuda ('at Harewood'); it is next attested in the Domesday Book of 1086, as Hareuuode. Although consideration has been given to an origin involving the Old English word hār ('grey'), commentators agree that, as the name's present-day form suggests, the name comes from the Old English words hara ('hare') and wudu ('wood'). Thus it once meant 'wood characterised by hares'.

== Location ==
Harewood sits in the Harewood ward of Leeds City Council and Elmet and Rothwell parliamentary constituency.

The A61 from Leeds city centre to Harrogate passes through the village. The A659 from Collingham joins the A61 outside the main entrance to Harewood House (/ˈhɑːrwʊd/ HAR-wuud) to descend the slopes of the Wharfe valley before continuing towards Pool-in-Wharfedale.

== Amenities ==
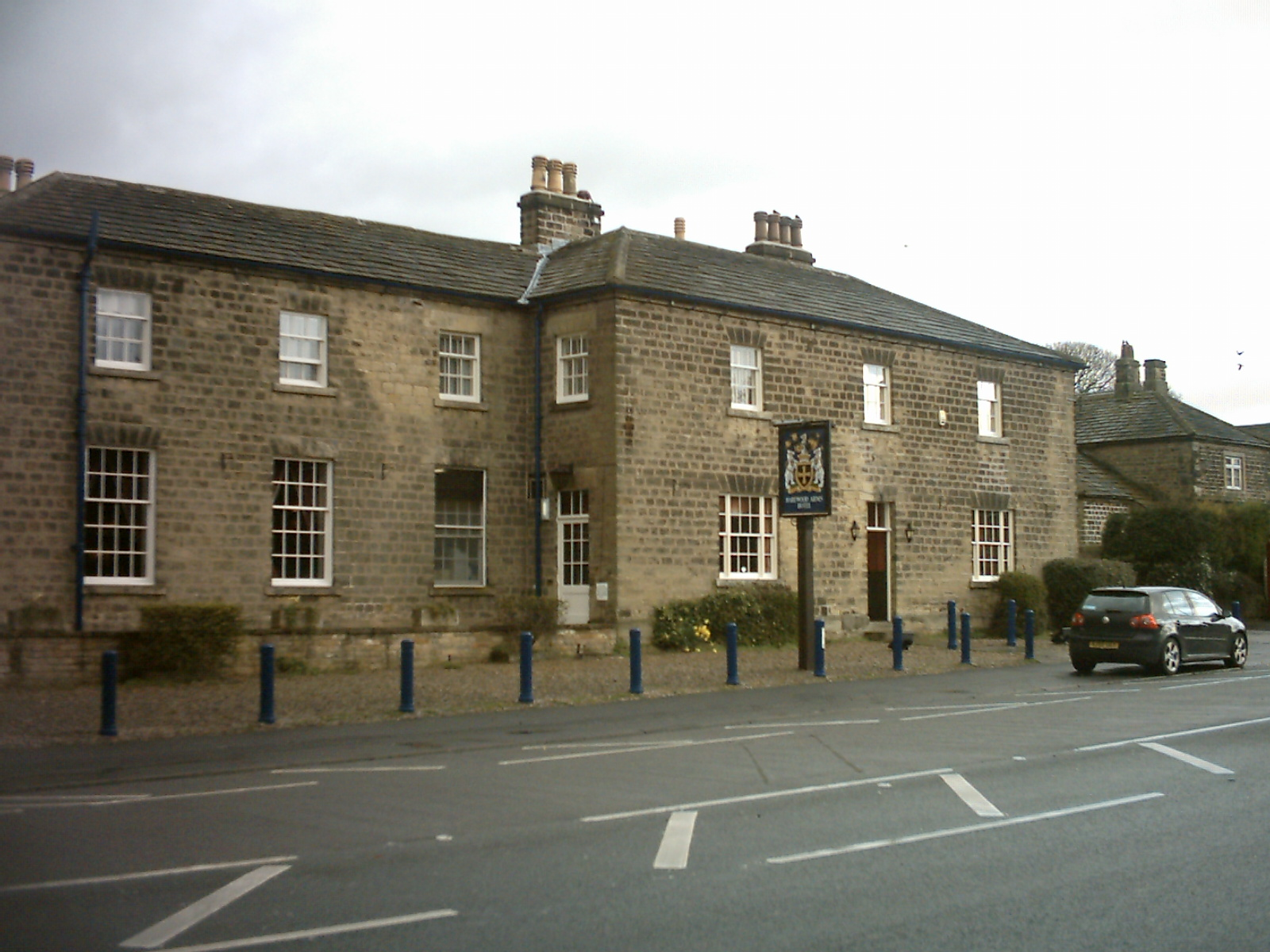
Harewood Arms

The Harewood Arms public house and hotel is opposite the entrance to the Harewood Estate.

Other facilities in the village include a medical centre, mobile library, cemetery, community cafe, and a village hall.

It is the location of the UK's longest motorsport hillclimb, Harewood speed Hillclimb (pronounced HAIR-wuud). The exterior set for the soap opera Emmerdale is located in the Harewood estate.

== Education ==
Harewood C of E Primary School is a state-funded faith school which stands opposite the grounds of the Harewood estate on the A61 and was built by the estate in 1864 for estate workers' children. In 2005 and 2008 the school was awarded "outstanding" grading following Ofsted inspections. The school maintains its historic links with the estate, the children regularly use its grounds and educational facilities.

Gateways School is an independent private school with a sixth form. The junior school and nursery are co-educational, admitting boys and girls to age 11.

== Manor ==
The manor of Harewood was the seat of the de Romelli family, from which it passed by marriage of the heiress Avice de Romelli to her husband William de Curcy II (d. circa 1130), feudal baron of Stoke Curcy (now Stogursey) in Somerset, whose granddaughter and eventual heiress Alice de Curcy (sister and heiress of William de Curcy IV (d.1194)) married Warin FitzGerold (1167-post-1216), eldest son and heir of Henry FitzGerold (d.1174/5), Chamberlain to King Henry II. Alice's daughter and sole heiress was Margaret FitzGerold, who married Baldwin de Redvers (1200–1216), eldest son and heir apparent of William de Redvers, 5th Earl of Devon (d.1217) and father of Baldwin de Redvers, 6th Earl of Devon. The eventual heiress was Isabel de Forz, eldest daughter of Baldwin de Redvers, 6th Earl of Devon (1217–1245). Her heir to the manor of Harewood was her distant cousin Warin de Lisle (d.1296) of Cambridgeshire, whose paternal grandmother was Alice FitzGerold. The De Lisle family then moved their seat to Rougemont Castle within the manor of Harewood. Warin's son was Robert de Lisle, 1st Baron Lisle (title created 1311) called "of Rougemont" to distinguish his family from the unrelated Baron Lisle "of Wootton, Isle of Wight", created in 1299. The site of Rougemont Castle was abandoned in about 1366 when the Lisle family built Harewood Castle nearby, of which much of the ruined stone structure survives, also hidden in overgrown woodland. Harewood Castle itself was abandoned as a residence soon after 1600 when it was owned by Sir William Wentworth of Gawthorpe Hall. The manor of Harewood containing both ruined castles was purchased in 1738 by the Lascelles family, which built there as its seat the surviving palatial 18th-century mansion known as Harewood House, still owned by the family, which was created Earl of Harewood in 1812.

== Harewood House ==
Harewood House, a country house was designed by architects John Carr and Robert Adam, and built between 1759 and 1771 for Edwin Lascelles, 1st Baron Harewood. Its garden of more than 100 acres (40 ha) is set in a landscape of 1,000 acres (400 ha) designed by Lancelot "Capability" Brown.

== All Saints' Church ==
All Saints' Church, the former parish church, stands to the west of the village, in the grounds of Harewood House which was built in the 18th century. The village was relocated in the late 18th century, leaving the church isolated from the village population. It is a Grade I listed building but is no longer used regularly for worship and is in the care of the Churches Conservation Trust.

== Harewood Parish Council ==
The area covered by the parish council includes Harewood, Slaid Hill, Wigton Moor and Wike. Wigton Moor is the most populous part of the parish. Weardley was served by its own parish council from 1866 until 1 April 1937, when its parish was abolished and it merged with Harewood. The parish council manages and maintains Harewood Cemetery.

== See also ==
- Harwood (disambiguation)
- Harewood Castle
- Listed buildings in Harewood, West Yorkshire
