= Collingham Bridge =

Grade II listed road bridge in West Yorkshire, England

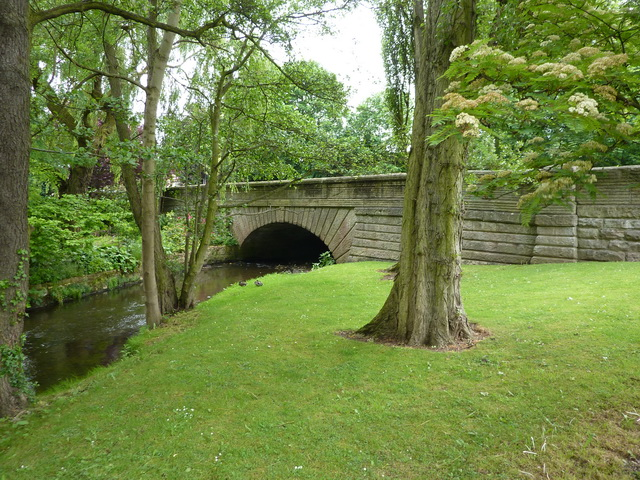
- Collingham Bridge
- Coordinates: 53.908289°N 1.412966°W
- Carries: A659 road
- Crosses: Collingham Beck
- Locale: Collingham, West Yorkshire

Characteristics
- Design: arch bridge
- Material: Stone
- No. of spans: 1

Location
- Interactive map of Collingham Bridge

Collingham Bridge is a road bridge that spans the Collingham Beck, a tributary of the River Wharfe on Harewood Road in Collingham, West Yorkshire, England.

Bernard Hartley, the county surveyor for the West Riding of Yorkshire, was probably responsible for building the road bridge over the beck in about 1790. The Grade II listed bridge has a single arch and rusticated stone parapets.

The bridge gave its name to the village railway station, distinguishing it from a station in Nottinghamshire.

== See also ==
- Listed buildings in Collingham, West Yorkshire
