= Harewood (ward) =

Electoral ward in Leeds, England

- Harewood highlighted within Leeds
- Population: 14,942 (2023 electorate)
- Metropolitan borough: City of Leeds
- Metropolitan county: West Yorkshire
- Region: Yorkshire and the Humber
- Country: England
- Sovereign state: United Kingdom
- UK Parliament: Wetherby and Easingwold
- Councillors: Sam Firth (Conservative); Angela Wallis (Conservative); Ryan Stephenson (Conservative)

Harewood is an electoral ward of Leeds City Council in north east Leeds, West Yorkshire, covering rural villages including Barwick-in-Elmet, Collingham, Harewood, Scholes and Shadwell.

== Boundaries ==
The Harewood ward includes the following civil parishes:

- Aberford (part of Aberford and District Parish Council)
- Barwick-in-Elmet and Scholes
- Bardsey cum Rigton
- Collingham (Collingham with Linton Parish Council)
- East Keswick
- Harewood (majority - although south western section of Wigton, including Slaid Hill, sits in Alwoodley ward)
- Lotherton cum Aberford (Aberford and District Parish Council)
- Parlington (Aberford and District Parish Council)
- Scarcroft
- Shadwell
- Thorner
- Wothersome

== Councillors ==
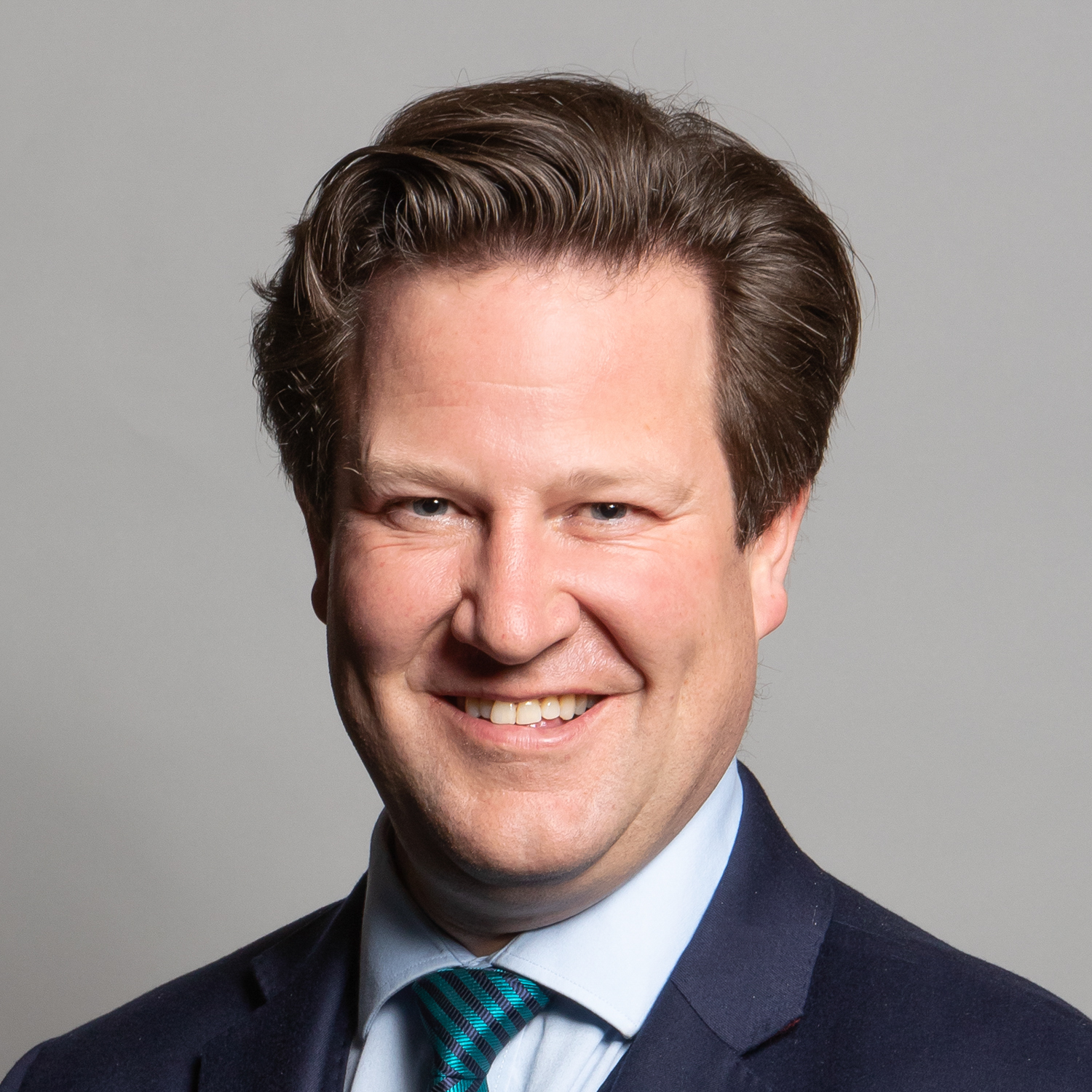
Alec Shelbrooke represented Harewood ward (2004-2010). Member of Parliament for Elmet and Rothwell since 2010.

Election	Councillor	Councillor	Councillor
2004	Ann Castle (Con) (Note: Castle had been a Weetwood ward councillor from 1988 until she lost her seat in 1996. She then represented Roundhay ward from 2000 until her 2004 election for the new Harewood ward.)	Rachael Procter (Con)	Alec Shelbrooke (Con)
2006	Ann Castle (Con)	Rachael Procter (Con)	Alec Shelbrooke (Con)
2007	Ann Castle (Con)	Rachael Procter (Con)	Alec Shelbrooke (Con)
2008	Ann Castle (Con)	Rachael Procter (Con)	Alec Shelbrooke (Con)
2010	Ann Castle (Con)	Rachael Procter (Con)	Matthew Robinson (Con)
2011	Ann Castle (Con)	Rachael Procter (Con)	Matthew Robinson (Con)
2012	Ann Castle (Con)	Rachael Procter (Con)	Matthew Robinson (Con)
2014	Ann Castle (Con)	Rachael Procter (Con)	Matthew Robinson (Con)
2015	Ann Castle (Con)	Rachael Procter (Con)	Matthew Robinson (Con)
2016	Ryan Stephenson (Con)	Rachael Procter (Con) (Note: Procter was not re-selected by her local Elmet and Rothwell Conservative Association to stand again in her council ward at the 2018 election. The Yorkshire Evening Post reported Procter "felt 'bullied and intimidated' in a Conservative Party [selection] interview" and unsuccessfully appealed the decision.)	Matthew Robinson (Con)
2018	Ryan Stephenson (Con)	Sam Firth (Con)	Matthew Robinson (Con)
2019	Ryan Stephenson (Con)	Sam Firth (Con)	Matthew Robinson (Con)
2021	Ryan Stephenson (Con)	Sam Firth (Con)	Matthew Robinson (Con)
2022	Ryan Stephenson (Con)	Sam Firth (Con)	Matthew Robinson (Con)
2023	Ryan Stephenson (Con)	Sam Firth (Con)	Matthew Robinson (Con)
2024	Ryan Stephenson (Con)	Sam Firth (Con)	Matthew Robinson (Con)
2026	Ryan Stephenson* (Con)	Sam Firth* (Con)	Angela Wallis* (Con)

indicates seat up for re-election. * indicates incumbent councillor.

== Elections since 2010 ==
=== May 2026 ===
2026
Party	Candidate	Votes	%	±%
Conservative	Angela Jane Bond Wallis	3,380	43.5	▼15.4
Reform	John Cowling	1,911	24.6	New
Labour	David John Bowgett	1,007	13.0	▼12.4
Green	Claire Anne Evans	842	10.8	▼0.2
Liberal Democrats	John William Hills	300	3.9	▼1.0
Independent	Patrick Wright	224	2.9	New
Majority		1,469	21.4	▼12.1
Turnout		7,673	51.3	▲9.5
Rejected ballots		9	0.1	
Registered electors		14,982		
Conservative hold		Swing	▼20.0	

=== May 2024 ===
2024
Party	Candidate	Votes	%	±%
Conservative	Sam Firth*	3,619	58.8	−0.8
Labour	Simon Dowling	1,560	25.4	+1.9
Green	Claire Evans	675	11.0	+1.0
Liberal Democrats	Jonathan Levy	299	4.9	−1.6
Majority		2,059	33.4	−2.8
Turnout		6,212	41.8	+0.2
Conservative hold		Swing	-1.4	

=== May 2023 ===
2023
Party	Candidate	Votes	%	±%
Conservative	Ryan Stephenson*	3,708	59.6	−1.8
Labour	Oliver Gill	1,459	23.5	+1.0
Green	Claire Evans	627	10.0	+1.0
Liberal Democrats	Dan Cook	406	6.5	−0.2
Majority		2,249	36.2	−2.7
Turnout		6,217	41.6	−2.6
Conservative hold		Swing		

=== May 2022 ===
2022
Party	Candidate	Votes	%	±%
Conservative	Matthew Robinson*	4,062	61.4	−5.9
Labour	Michael Millar	1,489	22.5	+4.6
Green	Claire Evans	596	9.0	+0.2
Liberal Democrats	Dan Cook	441	6.7	+1.6
Majority		2,573	38.9	−10.6
Turnout		6,616	44.2	−6.0
Conservative hold		Swing		

=== May 2021 ===
2021
Party	Candidate	Votes	%	±%
Conservative	Sam Firth*	5,080	67.3	−2.1
Labour	Michael Millar	1,347	17.9	+6.7
Green	Claire Evans	662	8.8	−3.9
Liberal Democrats	Dan Cook	383	5.1	−0.6
Majority		3,733	49.5	−6.2
Turnout		7,543	50.2	+11.6
Conservative hold		Swing		

=== May 2019 ===
2019
Party	Candidate	Votes	%	±%
Conservative	Ryan Stephenson*	3,891	69.4	+8.8
Green	David Corry	768	13.7	+1.2
Labour	Zahid Noor	627	11.2	−4.1
Liberal Democrats	Dan Cook	321	5.7	−5.9
Majority		3,264	55.7	+10.4
Turnout		5,710	38.6	−3.0
Conservative hold		Swing	+3.8	

=== May 2018 ===
2018
Party	Candidate	Votes	%	±%
Conservative	Matthew Robinson*	4,461	60.6	+2.8
Conservative	Samuel Firth	4,039		
Conservative	Ryan Stephenson*	4,003		
Labour	Adrian Duthie	1,126	15.3	+1.3
Green	David Corry	918	12.5	+5.8
Labour	Kathryn Stainburn	912		
Liberal Democrats	Dan Cook	852	11.6	+4.1
Labour	Zahid Noor	757		
Majority		3,335	45.3	+3.1
Turnout		14,949	41.6	+2.9
Conservative hold		Swing		
Conservative hold		Swing		
Conservative hold		Swing		

=== May 2016 ===
2016
Party	Candidate	Votes	%	±%
Conservative	Ryan Stephenson	3,295	57.8	−3.0
Labour	Leo Verity	946	16.6	−0.8
UKIP	Rosemary O'Dea	706	12.4	+1.4
Green	David Corry	382	6.7	+1.4
Liberal Democrats	Sara Howell	371	6.5	+1.0
Majority		2,349	41.2	−2.2
Turnout		5,700	38.7	
Conservative hold		Swing		

=== May 2015 ===
2015
Party	Candidate	Votes	%	±%
Conservative	Rachael Procter*	7,103	60.8	+1.3
Labour	Tosin Abbey-Philip	2,035	17.4	+1.8
UKIP	Ian Greenberg	1,289	11.0	−8.8
Liberal Democrats	Christine Golton	638	5.5	+1.3
Green	Janet Heath	624	5.3	+4.3
Majority		5,068	43.4	−2.5
Turnout		11,689	76.7	
Conservative hold		Swing	-0.3	

=== May 2014 ===
2014
Party	Candidate	Votes	%	±%
Conservative	Matthew Robinson*	3,542	59.5	
UKIP	Peter Morgan	1,176	19.8	
Labour	David Joyce	928	15.6	
Liberal Democrats	Christine Golton	249	4.2	
Green	Paul Matthews	58	1.0	
Majority		2,366	5953	
Turnout			42.0	
Conservative hold		Swing		

=== May 2012 ===
2012
Party	Candidate	Votes	%	±%
Conservative	Ann Castle*	3,555	60.0	−7.1
Labour	Richard Beacham	1,156	19.5	−1.7
UKIP	Peter Morgan	636	10.7	+10.7
Liberal Democrats	Sara Howell	312	5.3	−1.1
Green	Patricia Capstick	262	4.4	−0.9
Majority		2,399	40.5	−5.4
Turnout		5,921		
Conservative hold		Swing	-2.7	

=== May 2011 ===
2011
Party	Candidate	Votes	%	±%
Conservative	Rachael Procter*	5,003	67.1	+7.5
Labour	Joshua Blower	1,581	21.2	+3.6
Liberal Democrats	Sara Howell	472	6.3	−10.8
Green	Patricia Capstick	400	5.4	+3.0
Majority		3,442	45.9	+3.9
Turnout		7,456	51	
Conservative hold		Swing	+1.9	

=== May 2010 ===
2010
Party	Candidate	Votes	%	±%
Conservative	Matthew Robinson	6,910	59.6	−13.7
Labour	Stuart McKenna	2,038	17.6	+6.7
Liberal Democrats	Richard Pearcey	1,990	17.2	+10.8
BNP	Martin Gibson	382	3.3	−2.3
Green	Patricia Capstick	275	2.4	−0.7
Majority		4,872	42.0	−20.4
Turnout		11,595	78.4	+32.5
Conservative hold		Swing	-10.2	
