= Linton, West Yorkshire =

Village in West Yorkshire, England

Coordinates: 53.916°N 1.407°W

Linton
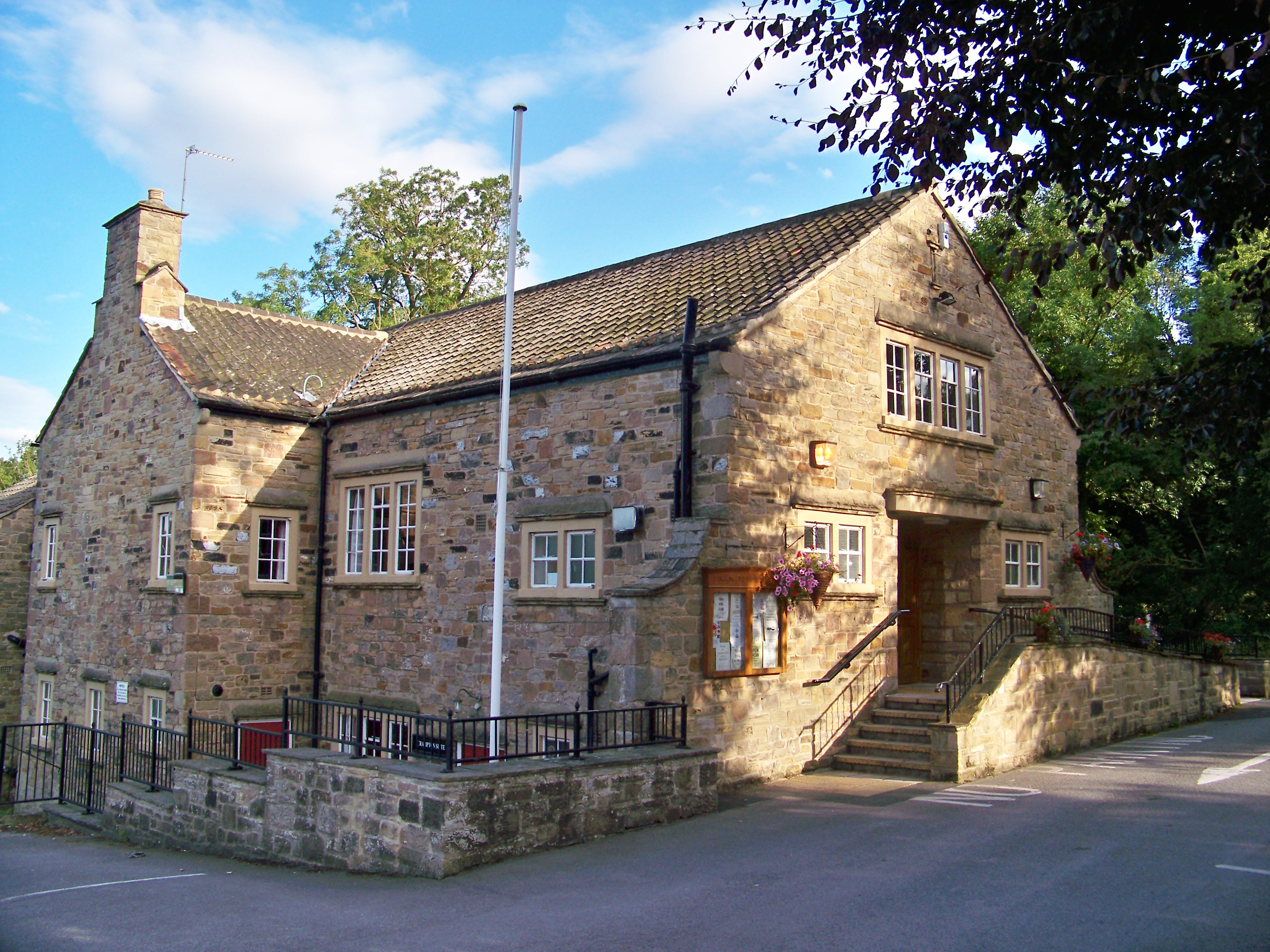
- Linton village hall

- Location within West Yorkshire
- OS grid reference: SE389468
- Civil parish: Collingham
- Metropolitan borough: City of Leeds
- Metropolitan county: West Yorkshire
- Region: Yorkshire and the Humber
- Country: England
- Sovereign state: United Kingdom
- Post town: WETHERBY
- Postcode district: LS22
- Dialling code: 01937
- Police: West Yorkshire
- Fire: West Yorkshire
- Ambulance: Yorkshire
- UK Parliament: Wetherby and Easingwold

Linton is a village in the civil parish of Collingham, in the City of Leeds metropolitan borough, in West Yorkshire, England. It is 1.5 miles (2.4 km) south-west of Wetherby on the north bank of the River Wharfe, Collingham is on the opposite bank.

== History ==
Little is known of the early history of the village, but archaeologists have dated more than 8,000 local flints to between 10,000 and 2000 BC, and crop marks round the village point to ditched enclosures and field systems in the Iron Age and Roman period (800 BC – 410 AD). Roman artefacts have been found and in 1936 a Roman burial site was identified to the north of the village. The village is mentioned in the Domesday Book, where it is given a higher value than Wetherby. The Anglo-Saxon place name means "flax farm". There was a now-vanished medieval chapel in the village, possibly founded by the Percy family, once the landowners.

A Topographical Dictionary of England (ed. Samuel Lewis 1848) calls it "a township, in the parish of Spofforth, Upper division of the wapentake of Claro, W. riding of York, 1¾ mile (W. by S.) from Wetherby; containing 169 inhabitants. The township comprises by computation 1030 acres. The village is situated on the north side of the vale of the Wharfe. A rent-charge of £257. 10. has been awarded as a commutation for the tithes. There is a place of worship for Wesleyans." A correspondent writing in the Leeds Mercury on 8 September 1874 notes, "On the opposite side of the Wharfe [from Collingham], perched on the hillside, is the picturesque village of Linton, the most conspicuous object being a neat Wesleyan chapel." According to Kelly's Directory of 1893, Linton had four farms, a school (founded about 1859, later a church and now a dwelling house), a manor house (c. 1650 but much altered), and a public house, the Windmill Inn. The population of Linton in the 1920s was a mere 130.

The golf course on Linton Ings opened in 1910. The architect William Alban Jones was responsible for several houses built in the Arts and Crafts style round the old village centre in the 1920s, and also for the Memorial Hall (1947). In 1931 the parish population was 393.

The Grade II listed Linton Bridge was built over the River Wharfe in the early to mid-19th century. It was closed in December 2015 after being damaged by flood water in the aftermath of Storm Eva, but reopened in September 2017.

=== Governance ===
Linton was a township in the ecclesiastical parish of Spofforth. In 1866 Linton became a civil parish until 1 April 1937 when it was abolished and merged with Collingham and Wetherby.

== Facilities ==
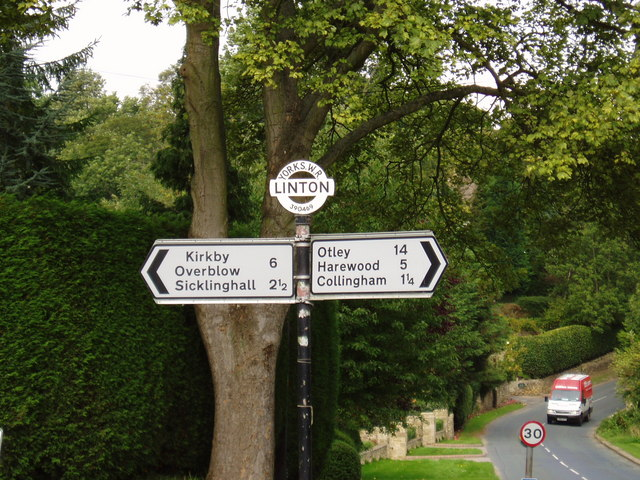
Road sign with grid reference

The Windmill Inn in Main Street includes a restaurant. There is no shop or school. Wetherby Golf Club is situated in Linton. The historic Wood Hall Hotel and Spa (Hand Picked Hotels) lies on the outskirts; it has function rooms and health-club facilities. The Memorial Hall has a car park and tennis courts.

== Worship ==
The village no longer has a place of worship. It is part of the Anglican ecclesiastical parish of Wetherby with Linton, served by St James's Church in Wetherby. A community of Carmelite nuns occupy a modern house near Wood Hall.

== Notable people ==
In birth order

- Owen Lattimore (1900–1989), an American scholar of Mongolia and China, lived here in the 1960s while the first Professor of Chinese at the University of Leeds.
- Geoffrey Appleyard (1916–1943), an army officer of commandos decorated in World War II, was brought up in Linton.
- Ian Appleyard (1923–1998), brother of Geoffrey, was a rally driver and ornithologist.

== See also ==
- Listed buildings in Collingham, West Yorkshire
