= Linton Bridge =

Grade II listed road bridge in West Yorkshire, England

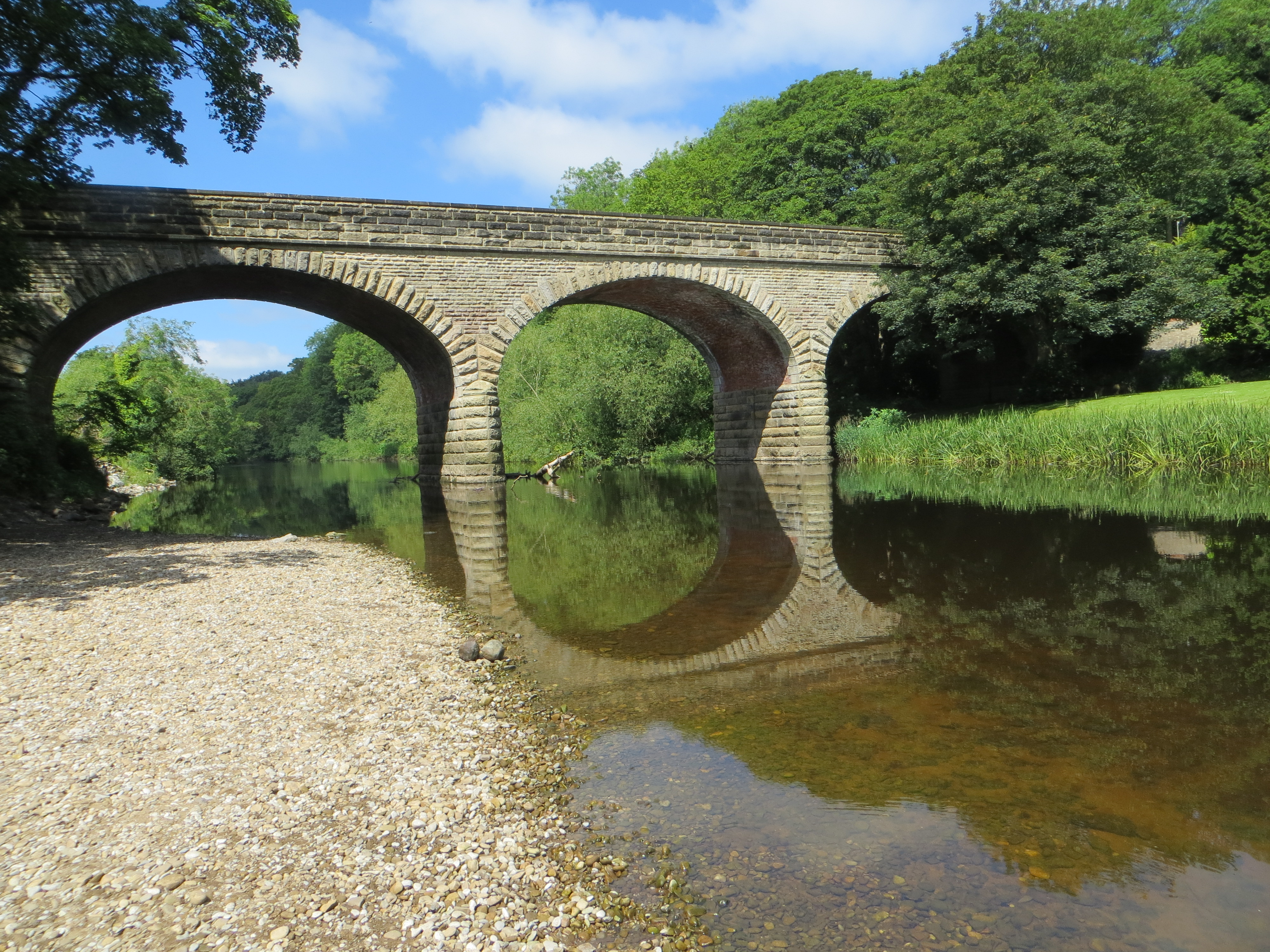
- Coordinates: 53.9127°N 1.4099°W
- Carries: Public road
- Crosses: River Wharfe
- Locale: Collingham and Linton, West Yorkshire
- Other name: Collingham Bridge

Characteristics
- Design: arch bridge
- Material: Stone
- No. of spans: 3
- Piers in water: 2

Location
- Interactive map of Linton Bridge

Linton Bridge carries the minor road that links Collingham and Linton over the River Wharfe near Wetherby in West Yorkshire, England.

The Grade II listed bridge was built out of rock-faced stone in the early to mid-19th century. Its parapet, terminating in square piers, was renewed later that century. It has three basket arches and rounded cutwaters.

The bridge was closed on 27 December 2015 after flood water, in the aftermath of Storm Eva, caused a pier to settle, cracking the carriageway and damaging its parapet. The closest road bridge linking the villages is Wetherby Bridge. The bridge reopened on 2 September 2017 after repairs costing £5.1 million. It was one of more than 100 bridges that were damaged in the aftermath of the storm.

== See also ==
- List of crossings of the River Wharfe
- Listed buildings in Collingham, West Yorkshire
