= Alec Shelbrooke =

British politician (born 1976)

The Right Honourable Sir Alec Shelbrooke KBE MP
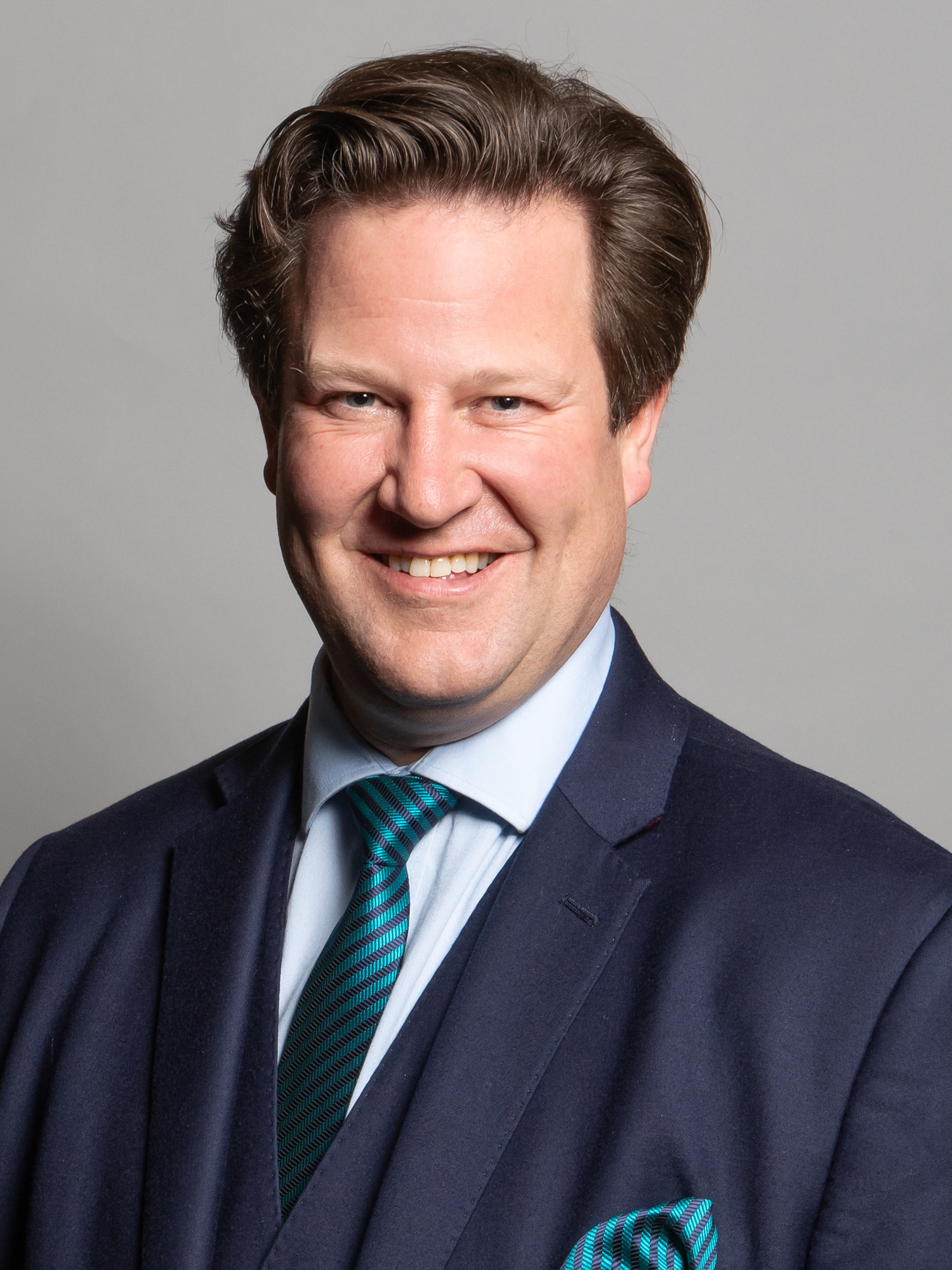

Vice President of the NATO Parliamentary Assembly
- Incumbent
- Assumed office 23 November 2024

Shadow Minister for Transport
- In office 19 July 2024 – 5 November 2024
- Leader: Rishi Sunak
- Preceded by: Stephen Morgan
- Succeeded by: Jerome Mayhew

Minister of State for Defence Procurement
- In office 7 September 2022 – 26 October 2022
- Prime Minister: Liz Truss; Rishi Sunak
- Preceded by: Jeremy Quin
- Succeeded by: Alex Chalk

Member of Parliament for Wetherby and Easingwold Elmet and Rothwell (2010–2024)
- Incumbent
- Assumed office 6 May 2010
- Preceded by: Constituency created
- Majority: 4,846 (9.2%)

Leeds City Councillor for Harewood
- Preceded by: Ward created
- Succeeded by: Matthew Robinson

Personal details
- Born: Alec Edward Shelbrooke; 10 January 1976 (age 50) Bromley, London, England
- Party: Conservative
- Spouse: Susan Spencer (m. 2011)
- Education: St George's Church of England School
- Alma mater: Brunel University (BEng)
- Website: Official website

Sir Alec Edward Shelbrooke KBE (born 10 January 1976) is a British Conservative Party politician who has been Member of Parliament for Wetherby and Easingwold since 2024 and for Elmet and Rothwell between 2010 and 2024. He previously served as Minister of State for Defence Procurement in the Truss ministry from September to October 2022.

== Early life ==
Born in 1976 in Bromley, south London, Shelbrooke was educated at St George's Church of England School in Gravesend and graduated with a degree in Mechanical Engineering from Brunel University in 1998. After leaving university, he joined the Royal Navy before becoming a project manager at the University of Leeds.

== Political career ==
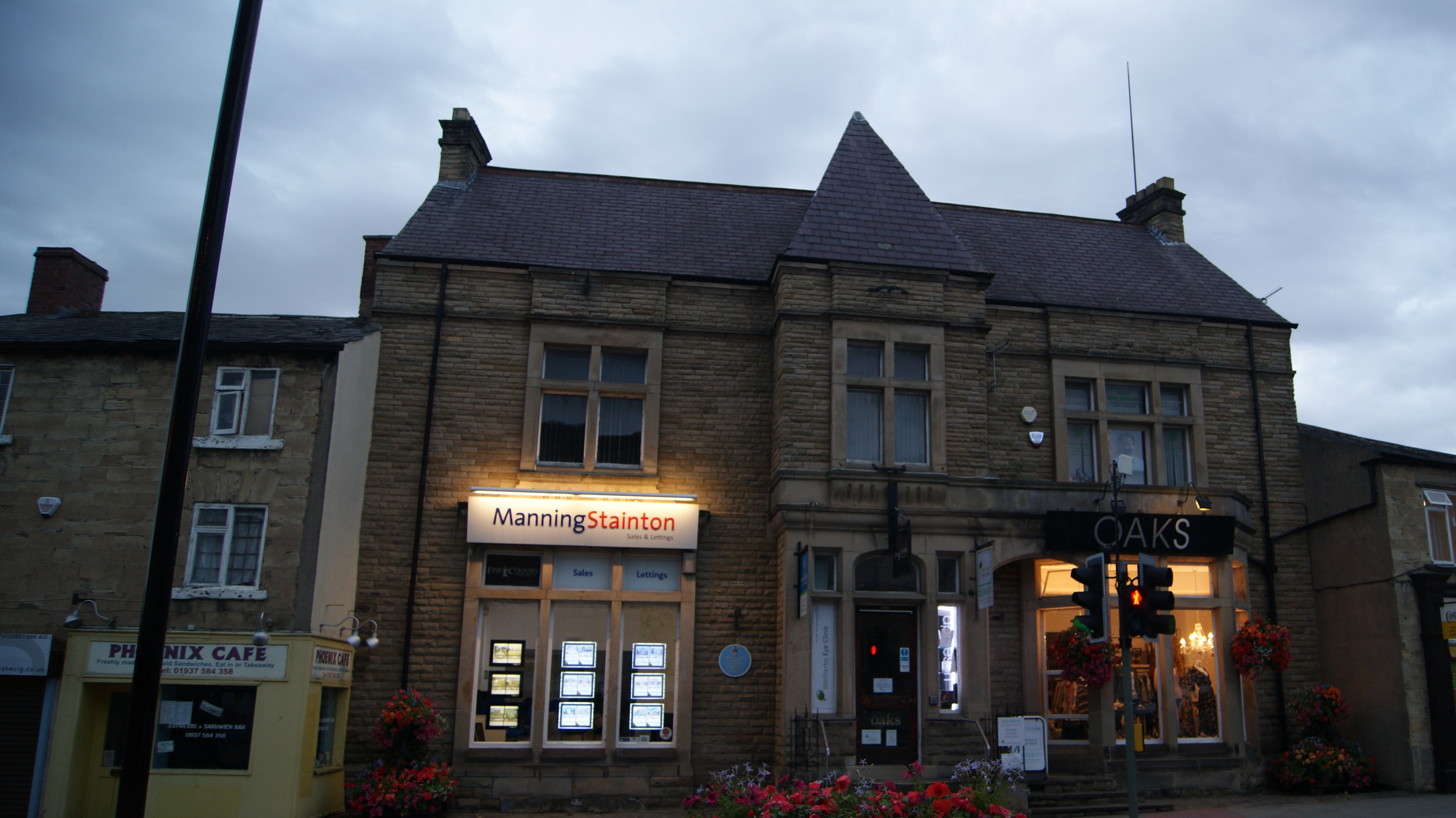
The constituency offices of Shelbrooke in Wetherby, West Yorkshire.

He has fought four local government elections (being elected to Leeds City Council in 2004 and re-elected in 2006 as Councillor for Harewood Ward) and unsuccessfully stood in Wakefield at the 2005 General Election. He was Deputy Chairman of Elmet Conservative Association from 2001 to 2004.

After entering Parliament, in November 2010 Shelbrooke was appointed the parliamentary private secretary (PPS) to Theresa Villiers, Minister of State for Transport.

In September 2012, Shelbrooke was made the PPS to Mike Penning, Minister of State for Northern Ireland. He announced his delight at taking over the responsibility for "Northern Island" [sic] on Twitter and later blamed the spelling mistake on autocorrect.

In December 2012, Shelbrooke introduced a Ten Minute Rule bill under which UK welfare claimants would be issued with a cash card instead of receiving their benefits in cash. The card would only permit claimants to make purchases such as food, clothing, energy, travel and housing, and prevent them purchasing items considered non-essential, such as cigarettes, alcohol, satellite television, and gambling.

He became a PPS in the Foreign Office in 2014. Shelbrooke was opposed to the United Kingdom leaving the European Union prior to the 2016 Brexit referendum.

In 2016, Shelbrooke commissioned a report written by Mark McBride-Wright quantifying the impact of homophobia within the engineering industry.

In 2017, he became Vice Chairman (International) of the Conservative Party, a soft-power role designed to promote the UK's interests overseas as well as supporting centre-right political parties in the developing world through the Westminster Foundation for Democracy. Shelbrooke remains an officer of the International Democrat Union. Shelbrooke was an Executive Member of the 1922 Committee during a period of turbulence within the Conservative Party leading to the resignation of Prime Minister Theresa May in 2019. Shelbrooke backed Jeremy Hunt in the 2019 Conservative Party leadership election that followed.

In 2020, Shelbrooke was appointed Leader of the UK Delegation to the NATO Parliamentary Assembly. He was elected Vice President of the NATO Parliamentary Assembly in November 2024.

In July 2022, Shelbrooke rebelled from the government for the first time in his parliamentary career by voting against the approval of the Conduct of Employment Agencies and Employment Businesses (Amendment) Regulations 2022.

On 7 September 2022, he was appointed Minister of State in the Ministry of Defence as part of the Truss administration. Shelbrooke was then immediately sacked on 26 October 2022 by the new prime minister, Rishi Sunak, and returned to the back benches.

In April 2023, he was selected as the candidate for the new constituency of Wetherby and Easingwold at the 2024 general election. He was re-elected with a majority of 4,846.

== Honours ==
Shelbrooke was appointed to the Privy Council on 8 October 2019. He was appointed Knight Commander of the Order of the British Empire (KBE) on 29 December 2023 in Truss's resignation honours list, for public and political service as Minister of State for Defence Procurement and as MP for Elmet and Rothwell.

== Personal life ==
Shelbrooke married Susan Spencer in 2011. He is partially deaf.

Parliament of the United Kingdom
New constituency	Member of Parliament for Elmet and Rothwell; 2010–2024	Incumbent
