= St Oswald's Church, Collingham =

Anglican church in West Yorkshire, England

Coordinates: 53.909°N 1.407°W

St Oswald's Church
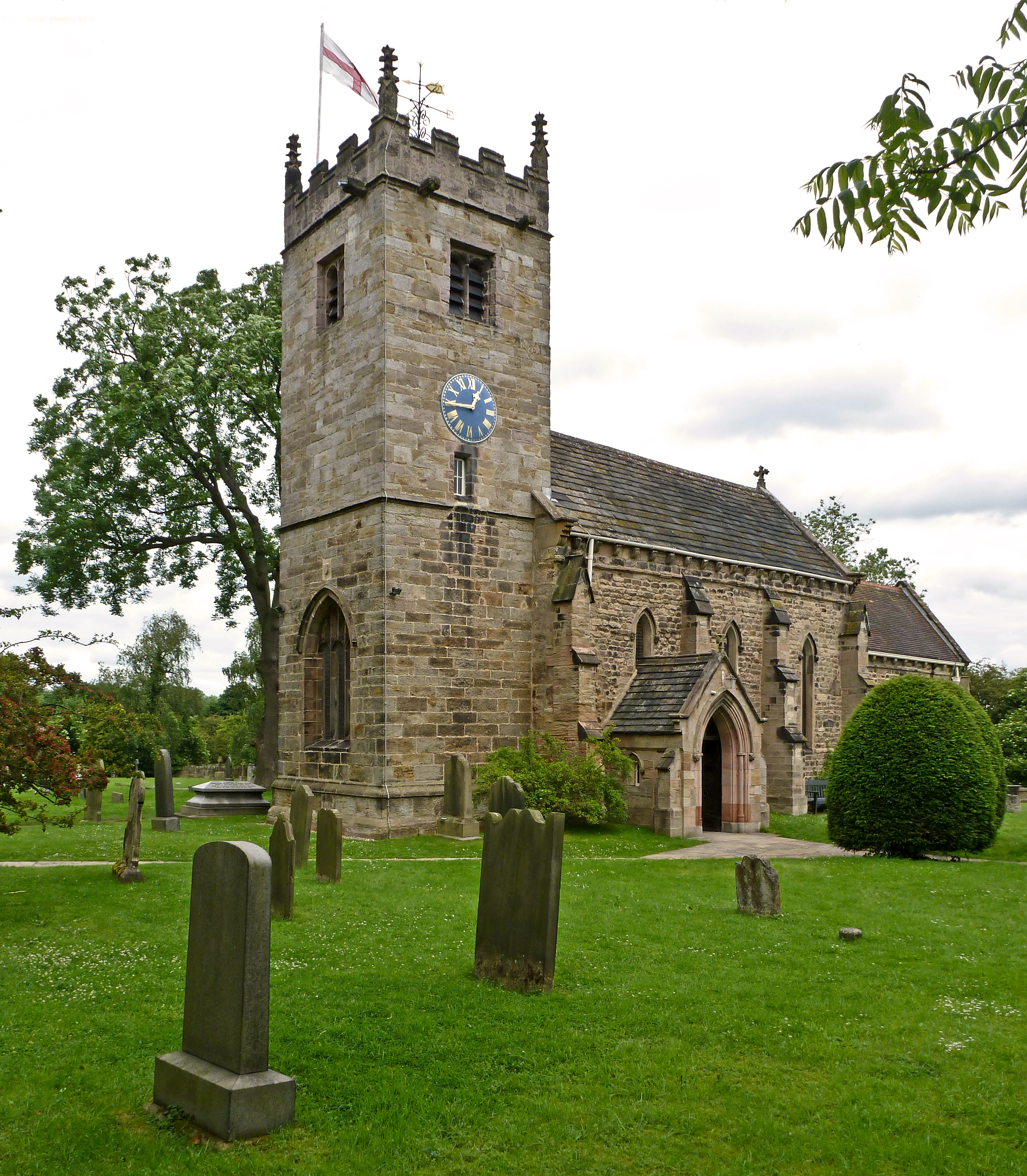
- Parish Church of St Oswald
- St Oswald's Church
- OS grid reference: SE 39015 46094
- Location: Collingham, Leeds, West Yorkshire
- Country: England
- Denomination: Church of England
- Website: The Parish of Collingham with Harewood

History
- Dedication: St Oswald

Administration
- Province: York
- Diocese: Leeds
- Archdeaconry: Leeds
- Parish: Collingham and Harewood

Clergy
- Vicar: The Reverend Carolyn James

St Oswald's Church is an active Anglican church in Collingham, West Yorkshire, England. It is in the Harrogate deanery and Diocese of Leeds. The church is on the edge of the village on Wetherby Road.

== History ==
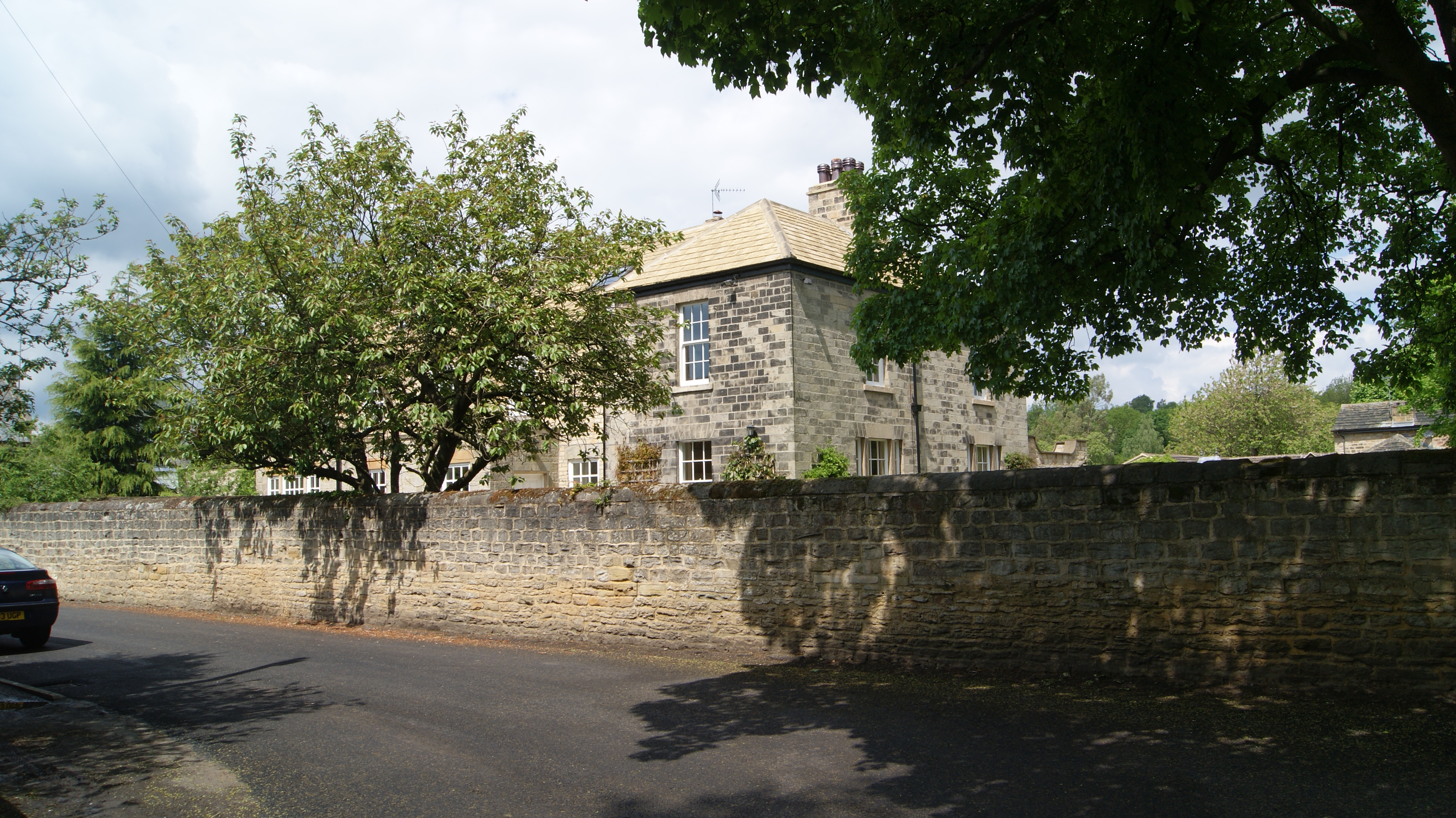
The Old Vicarage; the new one is situated opposite.

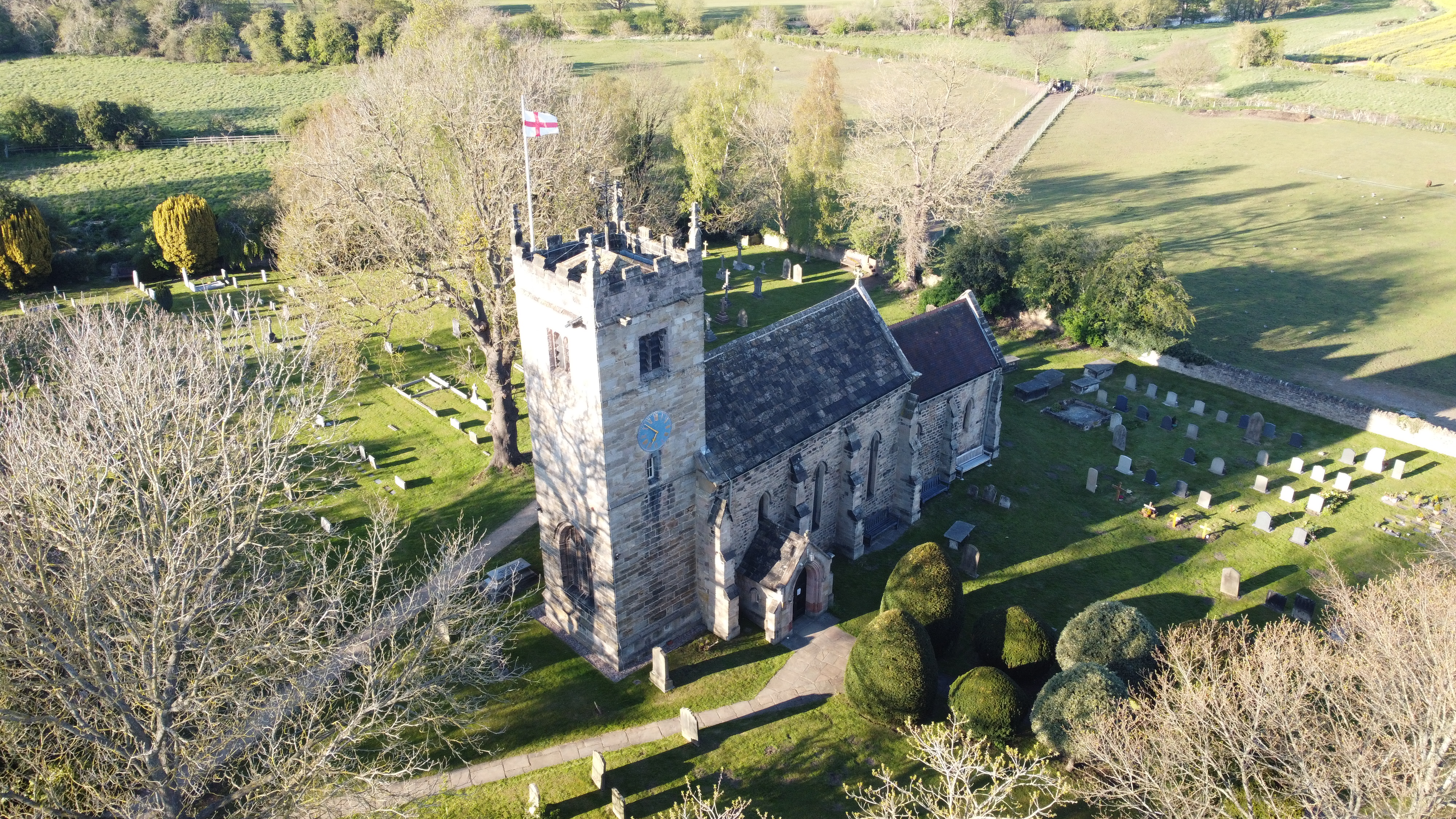
Aerial view of the church

Dedicated to Oswald of Northumbria, an Anglo-Saxon saint the church has Saxon origins, was rebuilt in the 15th century and restored and enlarged from 1840 to 1841. The tower was built in the 16th century and its clock was installed in 1891. The church was listed Grade II* on 22 July 1986.

== Church yard ==
The church graveyard contains the graves of Major General James Gunter (1833–1908), who served in the Crimean War, and Benjamin Eamonson (died 1867), who was its vicar for 29 years.

== See also ==
- Grade II* listed buildings in West Yorkshire
- Listed buildings in Collingham, West Yorkshire
