= Wetherby and Easingwold =

UK Parliament constituency (since 2024)

- County constituency for the House of Commons
- Boundaries since 2024
- Boundary of Wetherby and Easingwold in Yorkshire and the Humber
- County: North Yorkshire/West Yorkshire
- Major settlements: Wetherby, Easingwold, Tadcaster, Boroughbridge

Current constituency
- Created: 2024
- Member of Parliament: Alec Shelbrooke (Conservative)
- Seats: One
- Created from: Elmet and Rothwell (major part); Selby and Ainsty (part); Thirsk and Malton (part); Harrogate and Knaresborough (minor part); Skipton and Ripon (minor part)

Wetherby and Easingwold is a constituency of the House of Commons in the UK Parliament, partly in North Yorkshire and partly in West Yorkshire. Further to the completion of the 2023 Periodic Review of Westminster constituencies, it was first contested at the 2024 general election.

Alec Shelbrooke, previously Conservative MP for Elmet and Rothwell, was elected as the first MP for the new constituency.

== Boundaries ==
Under the 2023 review, the seat was defined as being composed of the following as they existed on 1 December 2020:

- The District of Hambleton wards of: Easingwold; Huby; Raskelf & White Horse.
- The Borough of Harrogate wards of: Bishop Monkton & Newby; Boroughbridge; Marston Moor; Ouseburn; Spofforth with Lower Wharfedale.
- The City of Leeds wards of: Harewood; Wetherby.
- The District of Selby wards of: Appleton Roebuck & Church Fenton; Tadcaster.

However, before the new boundaries came into effect, the second tier authorities in the county of North Yorkshire were abolished and absorbed into the new unitary authority of North Yorkshire with effect from 1 April 2023. Consequently, the constituency now comprises the following from the 2024 general election:

- The City of Leeds wards of: Harewood; Wetherby.
- The North Yorkshire electoral divisions of: Appleton Roebuck & Church Fenton; Boroughbridge & Claro (part); Easingwold; Hillside & Raskelf (part); Huby & Tollerton; Ouseburn; Spofforth with Lower Wharfedale & Tockwith; Tadcaster; Wathvale & Bishop Monkton (part).

The seat was created from the following:

- In the City of Leeds in West Yorkshire:
  - The wards of Harewood and Wetherby from Elmet and Rothwell (now abolished)
- In the former Hambleton District in North Yorkshire:
  - Easingwold, Huby, Raskelf and Tollerton from Thirsk and Malton
- In the former Selby District in North Yorkshire:
  - Appleton Roebuck, Church Fenton and Tadcaster from Selby and Ainsty
- In the former Borough of Harrogate in North Yorkshire:
  - Boroughbridge from Harrogate and Knaresborough
  - Ouseburn, Spofforth with Lower Wharfedale and Tockwith from Selby and Ainsty
  - Bishop Monkton from Skipton and Ripon

== Members of Parliament ==
Elmet and Rothwell prior to 2024

Election	Member	Party
2024	Alec Shelbrooke	Conservative

== Elections ==
=== Elections in the 2020s ===
General election 2024: Wetherby and Easingwold
Party	Candidate	Votes	%	±%
Conservative	Alec Shelbrooke	20,597	39.4	▼28.8
Labour	Ben Pickles	15,751	30.1	▲11.9
Reform	Mike Jordan	7,288	13.9	New
Green	Arnold Warneken (Note: Anna Jacobs was the original candidate for the Green Party, but withdrew a week before the close of nominations due to injuries sustained in a car accident.)	4,529	8.7	▲4.8
Liberal Democrats	James Monaghan	3,351	6.4	▼1.5
Yorkshire	John Hall	743	1.4	▼0.3
Majority		4,846	9.3	▼40.1
Turnout		52,259	70.3	▼5.8
Rejected ballots		171	0.3	
Total votes		52,430	100.0	
Registered electors		74,334		
Conservative hold		Swing	▼20.4	

=== Elections in the 2010s ===
2019 notional result
Party	Vote	%
Conservative	37,091	68.2
Labour	9,917	18.2
Liberal Democrats	4,305	7.9
Green	2,137	3.9
Yorkshire	937	1.7
Turnout	54,397	76.1
Electorate	71,455	

== See also ==
- List of parliamentary constituencies in West Yorkshire
- List of parliamentary constituencies in North Yorkshire
