= Elmet and Rothwell =

UK Parliament constituency (2010–2024)

- Former county constituency for the House of Commons
- 2010–2024 boundary of Elmet and Rothwell in West Yorkshire

- Location of West Yorkshire within England
- County: West Yorkshire
- Electorate: 80,957 (December 2019)
- Major settlements: Rothwell, Garforth, Wetherby

2010–2024
- Seats: One
- Created from: Elmet; Morley and Rothwell
- Replaced by: Wetherby and Easingwold; Selby; Leeds East; Wakefield and Rothwell

Elmet and Rothwell was a constituency for the House of Commons of the UK Parliament in West Yorkshire. (Note: Like all constituencies, the constituency elects one Member of Parliament (MP) by the first past the post system of election at least every five years.) During the 2017 general election, Elmet and Rothwell recorded the highest turnout of any seat in West or South Yorkshire, with almost 60,000 electors casting a vote.

There is no town of Elmet: the name refers to an ancient Celtic kingdom in the area. The name is, however, referenced by local villages Barwick-in-Elmet and Scholes-in-Elmet, and also Sherburn in Elmet, which is nearby but outside the constituency.

The seat was abolished for the 2024 general election.

== History ==
Following its review of parliamentary boundaries in West Yorkshire, the Boundary Commission for England created this constituency for the 2010 election, which principally contains the three towns of Garforth, Rothwell and Wetherby.

== Constituency profile ==
Situated to the east of Leeds is the seat of Elmet and Rothwell in West Yorkshire. The constituency is named after the town of Rothwell and the ancient British Celtic kingdom of Elmet. The constituency includes rural hinterland and commuter towns to the east of Leeds, including the historical market town of Wetherby, and former coal mining towns and villages, in an area slightly further south, such as Allerton Bywater, Garforth, Kippax, Methley, Oulton, Rothwell and Swillington. The pits in this area were closed on agreement that the workforce could transfer to the nearby Selby coalfield, so the area had several residents who commuted to work as miners as late as 2004.

This is mostly white, owner-occupier territory, with only one in 10 living in social housing, according to ONS 2011 Census figures for England and Wales. Considering this, below average levels of adults here claim Job Seeker's Allowance, with only 1% of constituents doing so. A quarter of the population works in retail and manufacturing; four in 10 have a professional, managerial or technical job, while one in 20 is an apprentice. 28% of constituents have a university degree or higher.

The area has below average levels of immigration. Only 4% of the constituency were born outside the UK, compared to 13% nationally.

Elmet and Rothwell ranks 206th in a list of the largest constituencies in the UK (geographical size), and 248th in a list of the largest constituencies by population size. It is the safest seat for the Conservative Party in West Yorkshire.

Academic analysis suggests that roughly 56% of electors in the constituency voted to Leave the European Union in the 2016 referendum.

== Boundaries ==
Map of boundaries 2010–2024

The City of Leeds wards of Garforth and Swillington, Harewood, Kippax and Methley, Rothwell, and Wetherby.

== Abolition in 2024 ==
Further to the completion of the 2023 Periodic Review of Westminster constituencies, the seat was abolished for the 2024 general election, with its contents distributed four ways:

Wards	Successor constituency
Harewood; Wetherby	Wetherby and Easingwold
Garforth; Swillington	Leeds East
Kippax; Methley	Selby
Rothwell	Wakefield and Rothwell

== Members of Parliament ==
=== MPs 2010–2024 ===
Elmet prior to 2010

Election	Member	Party
2010	Alec Shelbrooke	Conservative
2024	Constituency abolished	

== Election results 2010–2024 ==
=== Elections in the 2010s ===
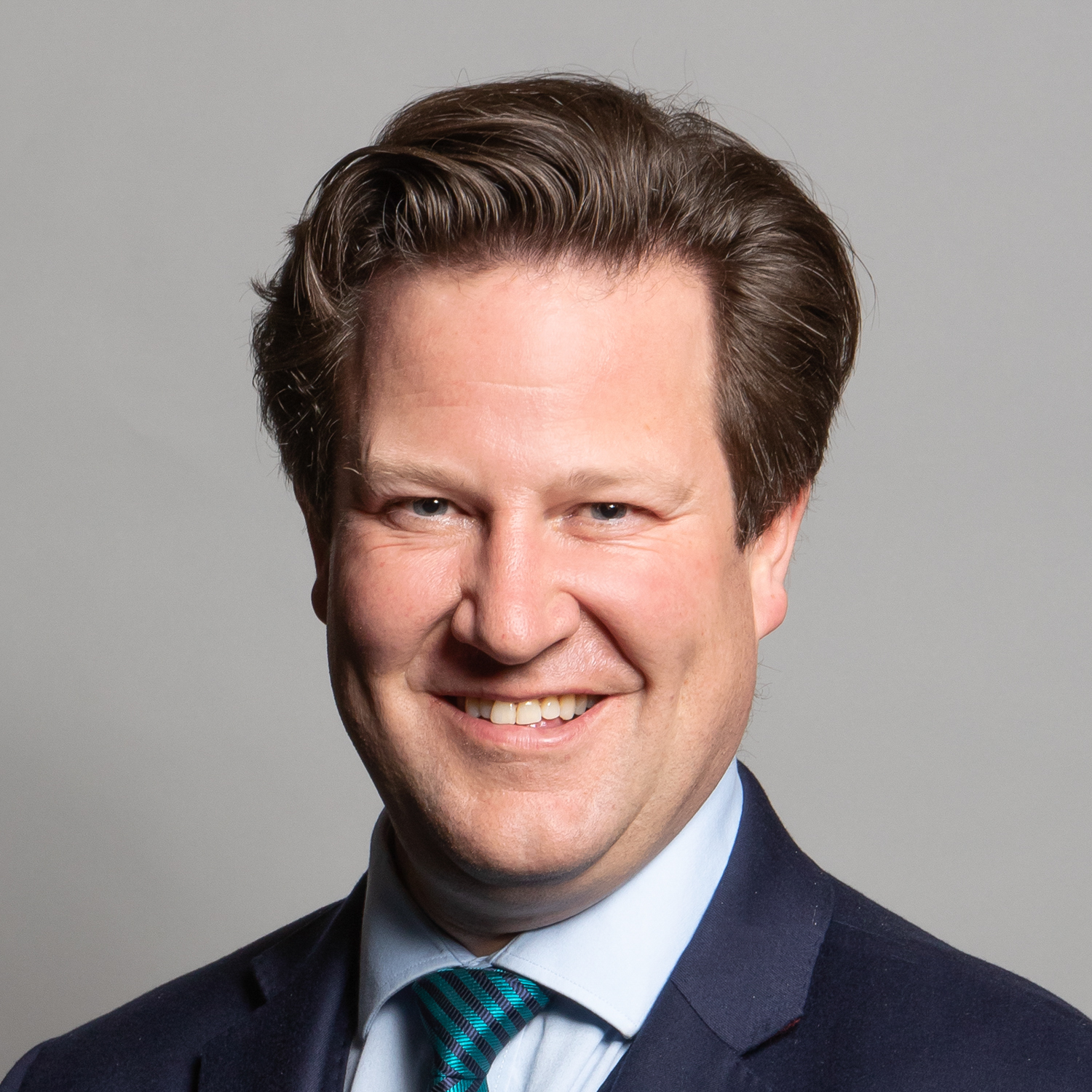
Alec Shelbrooke, MP for Elmet and Rothwell in 2010s and 2020s

This new constituency of Elmet and Rothwell was fought for the first time at the 2010 general election.

General election 2010: Elmet and Rothwell
Party	Candidate	Votes	%	±%
Conservative	Alec Shelbrooke	23,778	42.6	+8.1
Labour	James Lewis	19,257	34.5	−11.4
Liberal Democrats	Stewart Golton	9,109	16.3	−1.0
BNP	Sam Clayton	1,802	3.2	+0.9
UKIP	Darren Oddy	1,593	2.9	New
Independent	Christopher Nolan	250	0.4	New
Majority		4,521	8.1	+6.6
Turnout		55,789	71.8	+2.0
Conservative win (new seat)				

General election 2015: Elmet and Rothwell
Party	Candidate	Votes	%	±%
Conservative	Alec Shelbrooke	27,978	48.4	+5.8
Labour	Veronica King	19,488	33.7	−0.8
UKIP	Paul Spivey	6,430	11.1	+8.2
Liberal Democrats	Stewart Golton	2,640	4.6	−11.7
Green	Dave Brooks	1,261	2.2	New
Majority		8,490	14.7	+6.6
Turnout		57,797	73.0	+1.2
Conservative hold		Swing	+3.3	

By numerical vote share and percentage majority, the 2017 general election saw Elmet and Rothwell become the safest Conservative seat in West Yorkshire.

General election 2017: Elmet and Rothwell
Party	Candidate	Votes	%	±%
Conservative	Alec Shelbrooke	32,352	54.3	+5.9
Labour	David Nagle	22,547	37.9	+4.2
Liberal Democrats	Stewart Golton	2,606	4.4	−0.2
Yorkshire	Matthew Clover	1,042	1.8	New
Green	Dylan Brown	995	1.7	−0.5
Majority		9,805	16.4	+1.7
Turnout		59,542	74.2	+1.2
Conservative hold		Swing	+0.9	

The 2019 election saw Elmet and Rothwell continue to be the safest Conservative seat in West Yorkshire. A significant swing of nearly 7% to the Conservatives was recorded, in line with many seats in the area.

General election 2019: Elmet and Rothwell
Party	Candidate	Votes	%	±%
Conservative	Alec Shelbrooke	33,726	57.9	+3.6
Labour	David Nagle	16,373	28.1	−9.8
Liberal Democrats	Stewart Golton	5,155	8.9	+4.5
Green	Penny Stables	1,775	3.1	+1.4
Yorkshire	Matt Clover	1,196	2.1	+0.3
Majority		17,353	29.8	+13.4
Turnout		58,225	71.9	−2.3
Conservative hold		Swing	+6.7	

== See also ==
- List of parliamentary constituencies in West Yorkshire
