= List of public art in Bridgend County Borough =

Map of Wales with Bridgend County Borough highlighted

This is a list of public art in Bridgend County Borough in south Wales. This list applies only to works of public art on permanent display in an outdoor public space and does not, for example, include artworks in museums.

== Aberkenfig ==
Image	Title / subject	Location and coordinates	Date	Artist / designer	Type	Material	Dimensions	Designation	Wikidata	Notes
	War memorial	Aberkenfig	2010		Inscribed monolith	Granite				

== Blackmill ==
Image	Title / subject	Location and coordinates	Date	Artist / designer	Type	Material	Dimensions	Designation	Wikidata	Notes
	War memorial	Blackmill	1920		Pillar	Granite and sandstone		Grade II	Q29496088	

== Bridgend ==
Image	Title / subject	Location and coordinates	Date	Artist / designer	Type	Material	Dimensions	Designation	Wikidata	Notes
	Randell Memorial Drinking Fountain	Court Road, Bridgend	1860	JW Hugall	Spirelet with fountain	Stone and marble		Grade II		
	War memorial	St Illtyd's Church, Newcastle	1920		Calvary	Stone				
	War memorial	Dunraven Place, Bridgend	c.1920s	Walter Cook, HH Martyn & Co.	Obelisk with statue	Portland stone	7m tall	Grade II	Q29489758	
	War memorial	St Mary's church hall, Coity, Bridgend	1923	Moses Harding	Celtic cross	Cornish granite	3.3m tall			
	Gorsedd stone	Bridgend	1947		Monolith	Stone				Erected for the 1947 National Eisteddfod of Wales with a plaque added to mark the 1997 event.

== Caerau ==
Image	Title / subject	Location and coordinates	Date	Artist / designer	Type	Material	Dimensions	Designation	Wikidata	Notes
	War memorial	Village Square, Caerau			Cenotaph	Stone				

== Cefn Cribwr ==
Image	Title / subject	Location and coordinates	Date	Artist / designer	Type	Material	Dimensions	Designation	Wikidata	Notes
	War memorial	Bach Mynydd Common, Cefn Cribwr	2013	Naomi Leake	Celtic cross	Stone				

== Kenfig Hill ==
Image	Title / subject	Location and coordinates	Date	Artist / designer	Type	Material	Dimensions	Designation	Wikidata	Notes
	War memorial	Kenfig Hill	1925	Louis Frederick Roslyn	Statue on column	Bronze and granite		Grade II	Q29496610	

== Pencoed ==
Image	Title / subject	Location and coordinates	Date	Artist / designer	Type	Material	Dimensions	Designation	Wikidata	Notes
	War memorial	Pencoed	1924	William Storr Barber	Statue on pedestal	Stone		Grade II	Q29496875	

== Pontycymer ==
Image	Title / subject	Location and coordinates	Date	Artist / designer	Type	Material	Dimensions	Designation	Wikidata	Notes
	War memorial	The Memorial Hall, Pontycymer			Tablet and plinth	Stone				

== Porthcawl ==
Image	Title / subject	Location and coordinates	Date	Artist / designer	Type	Material	Dimensions	Designation	Wikidata	Notes
	War memorial	All Saint's churchyard, Porthcawl	1921	W Clarke	Plinth and cross	Portland stone	5.2m high			

== Llangynwyd ==
Image	Title / subject	Location and coordinates	Date	Artist / designer	Type	Material	Dimensions	Designation	Wikidata	Notes
	The Hopcyn cross	Llangynwyd	1927-28	Christopher Williams	Cross on steps	Granite		Grade II	Q29497769	
	War memorial	Llangynwyd			Celtic cross	Marble				

== Maesteg ==
Image	Title / subject	Location and coordinates	Date	Artist / designer	Type	Material	Dimensions	Designation	Wikidata	Notes
	War memorial	St David's Church, Maesteg	1926	Louis Frederick Roslyn	Statue group on plinth	Bronze and granite	6m high	Grade II	Q29495986	
