= Wetherby War Memorial =

War memorial in Wetherby, West Yorkshire, England

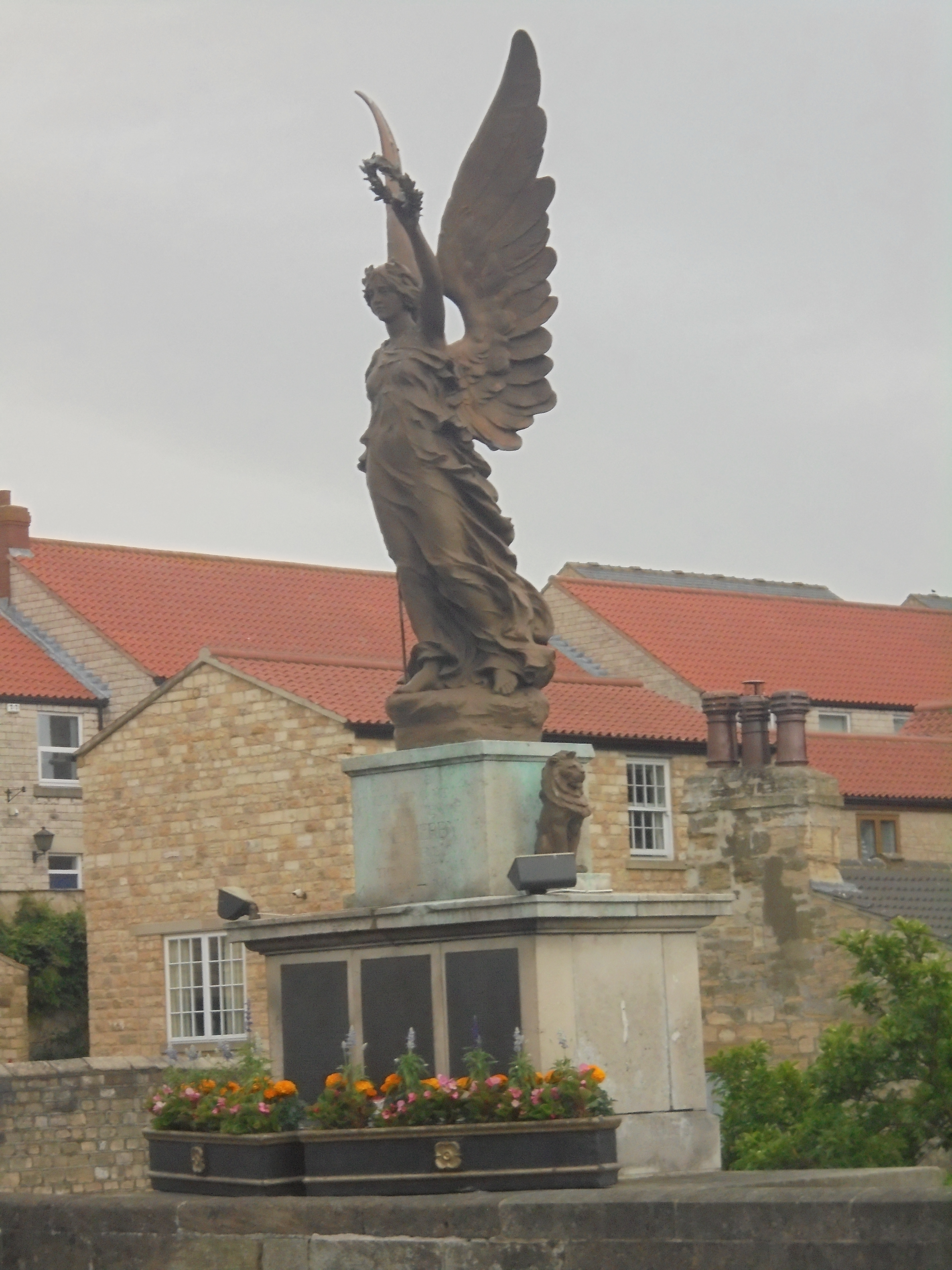
- Wetherby War Memorial
- Location: Wetherby Bridge
- Coordinates: 53°55′36″N 1°23′10″W
- Built: 1920
- Architect: Louis Frederick Roslyn

Listed Building – Grade II

Wetherby War Memorial stands on Wetherby Bridge in Wetherby, West Yorkshire. It was erected as a memorial to those who had fallen in the First World War. The memorial was designed by Louis Frederick Roslyn.

== Memorials ==
The war memorial commemorates those from Wetherby who were casualties of the First World War. The inscription upon it reads 'IN HONOUR AND EVERLASTING MEMORY OF THE MEN OF WETHERBY WHO FELL IN THE GREAT WAR 1914-1918'. There are plaques below with the names of the casualties; the plaques on the front of the memorial listing the names of great war casualties. Additional plaques were added to either side for the casualties of the Second World War.

== Listing ==
The memorial has been Grade II listed since 1966.

== Remembrance Sunday ==
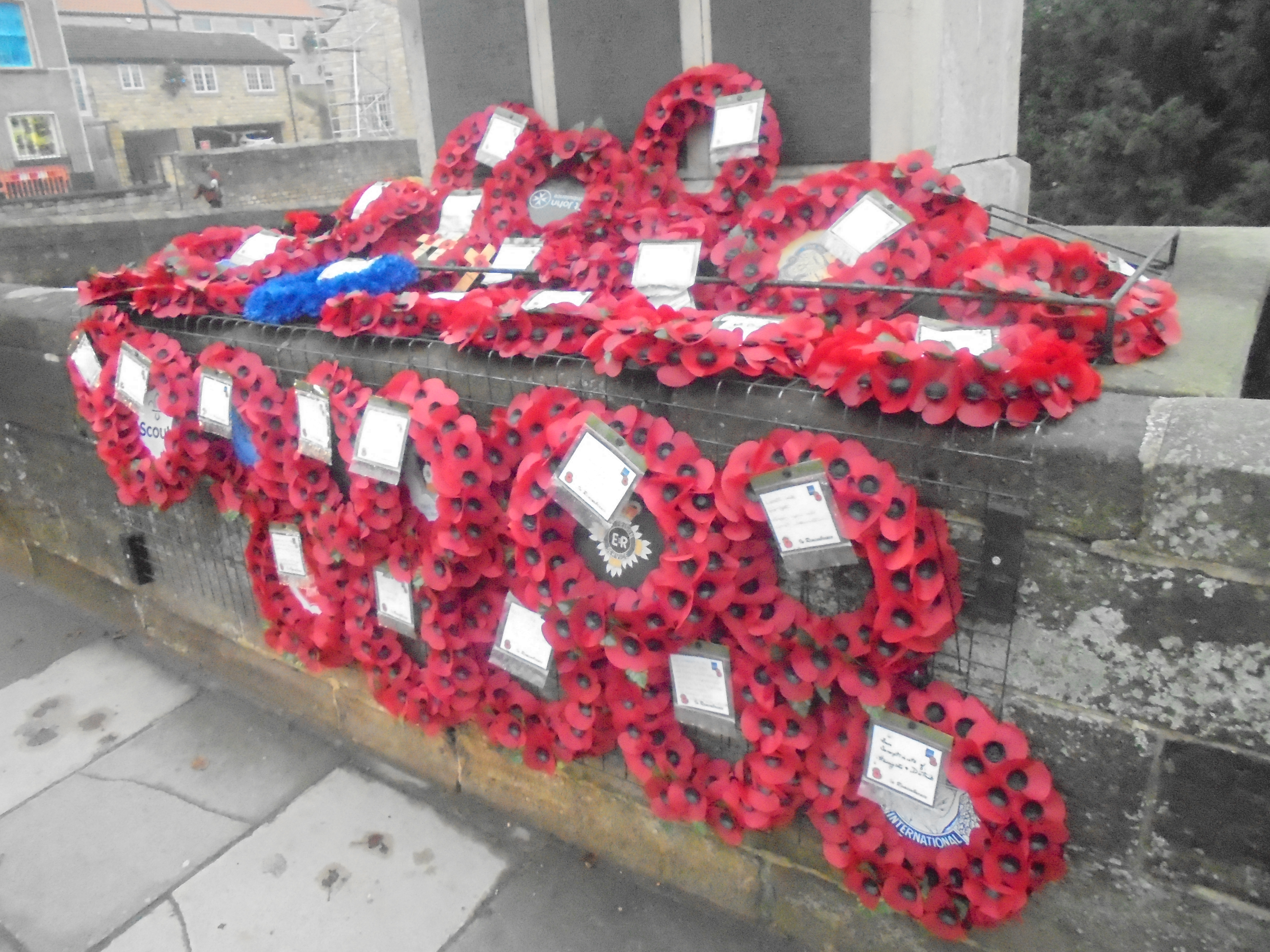
Wreaths on the war memorial following the 2018 Remembrance Sunday parade

The Remembrance Sunday parade concludes by the war memorial. On the morning the Bridge is closed to traffic. Wreaths are placed at the memorial.

== See also ==
- Listed buildings in Wetherby

== Notes and references ==
Citations
