= Listed buildings in Wetherby =

Wetherby is a civil parish in the metropolitan borough of the City of Leeds, West Yorkshire, England. The parish contains 33 listed buildings that are recorded in the National Heritage List for England. All the listed buildings are designated at Grade II, the lowest of the three grades, which is applied to "buildings of national importance and special interest". The parish contains the town of Wetherby and the surrounding area. The listed buildings include houses and associated structures, road and railway bridges, churches, public houses, a bath house, former farm buildings, a town hall, a former railway engine shed, and two mileposts.

== Buildings ==
Name and location	Photograph	Date	Notes
Wetherby Bridge and war memorial 53.92655°N 1.38613°W		17th century	The bridge, which was rebuilt on the site of a 13th-century bridge, and widened in 1769–73 and 1826, carries Boston Road (A168 road) over the River Wharfe. It is in gritstone, and consists of six segmental arches with triangular cutwaters that rise to piers. On the east side at the north end is a war memorial dating from 1922. This consists of a bronze statue depicting Victory holding a sword and a laurel wreath, standing on a stone pedestal flanked by two seated bronze lions. On the pedestal are plaques with the names of those lost in the First World War. The bridge is also a scheduled monument.
41, 43, 43A and 45 High Street and 34 and 36 Market Place; 53.92831°N 1.38589°W		c. 1700	A house, at one time an inn and later divided for different uses, it is rendered, with rusticated quoins, an eaves cornice, and roofs partly of pantiles and partly of Welsh slate, hipped on the right. There are two storeys, five bays on the front, and four on the right return. In the ground floor are modern shop fronts, and in the upper floor are sash windows with keystones, and modern casement windows.
Swan and Talbot; 53.92950°N 1.38519°W		Early 18th century (or earlier)	The public house, formerly a coaching inn, is stuccoed, on a plinth, and has tiled eaves courses and a pantile roof. There are two storeys and five bays, with a corniced pilaster on the left. The doorway has a Tuscan surround with triglyphs, a vermiculated frieze, and a pediment with a vermiculated tympanum. The windows are sashes with architraves.
1, 3 and 5 Boston Road; 53.92523°N 1.38563°W		Mid 18th century	An inn, later extended and divided into three dwellings, it is in magnesian limestone on a plinth, and has a stone slate roof with a coped gable on the right, and a hipped roof on the left. There are two storeys, four bays, and an added bay on the left. The recessed doorway has a fanlight and a moulded hood on shaped corbels, above which is a lintel with a keystone. The windows are sashes with keystones, those in the added bay with cambered heads.
Stone Dene; 53.93431°N 1.38425°W	—	Mid 18th century	The house, which was later extended, is in magnesian limestone with quoins, a sill band, and a hipped Welsh slate roof with coped gables and shaped kneelers. There are two storeys, three bays, a later bay recessed on the right, and a rear wing. In the middle bay is a canted projection containing a central doorway with a fanlight and sash windows. In the outer bays are casement windows with architraves and raised keystones.
Bath House; 53.92860°N 1.38923°W		Late 18th century	The bath house is in stone with quoins and a pantile roof. The eastern garden front has one storey, and contains a central doorway flanked by round-headed windows. The western river front has two storeys; in the upper floor is a central blocked doorway, above which are three window openings. In the lower part of the south front is a doorway, and inside is a large rectangular cold water plunge bath.
Gate piers, Ings House; 53.92884°N 1.39976°W	—	Late 18th century (probable)	The gate piers were moved from the boundary wall of Wetherby Grange to their present site in about 1986. They are in magnesian limestone, and each pier has a chamfered plinth, a rusticated square shaft, an architrave and a pulvinated frieze, and a broad cornice with a large ball finial.
The Angel; 53.92842°N 1.38550°W		Late 18th century	The public house is in stuccoed brick, with a rear wing in magnesian limestone, and a Welsh slate roof with a coped gable on the left. There are two storeys and attic, six bays, and two rear wings. The central doorway has pilasters, a double keystone, and a pediment. On the front are two bow windows, and the other windows are sashes.
Farm buildings, Micklethwaite Farm; 53.92556°N 1.38622°W		c. 1800	The farm buildings, later converted for residential use, are in magnesian limestone on a plinth, with quoins, a band, and roofs of pantiles and Welsh slate. There are two storeys and eight bays projecting at the ends and in the centre. Above the middle two bays at the front and the rear is a pediment with an oculus in the tympanum, and the end bays have moulded eaves cornices.
Priest Hill and outbuildings 53.93961°N 1.39524°W	—	c. 1800	The house and outbuildings are in magnesian limestone. The house has a hipped roof of Westmorland slate, two storeys, and fronts of two and four bays. On the front is a trellised porch and a doorway with a pediment, a sash window, a casement window, and a blind oculus. At the other end is a bay window and a lean-to conservatory. The outbuildings to the north have two storeys, a Welsh slate roof, two round-headed windows, and two sliding sash windows.
The Shambles; 53.92805°N 1.38624°W		1811	A stone colonnade with shops, extended at the north end in 1911. It has paired gutter brackets, and the roof is hipped at the left end and gabled on the right. There is a single storey and eleven bays, and one bay in the right return extension. The outer arches are round, those between are basket arches, and the piers are square. In the right return is a shop front with pilasters, plinths, bands, entablatures and ball finials. Above the shop front is a panel with an apron and a pediment containing an inscribed plaque and an inscribed frieze. At the top is a rounded gable with moulded copings.
Brunswick Yard; 53.92799°N 1.38519°W		c. 1820	Stables and a coach house converted for commercial use, the building is in magnesian limestone with a Welsh slate roof. There are two storeys and a U-shaped plan with a range of three bays and projecting two-bay wings with hipped roofs. The openings include doorways with fanlights, casement windows, carriage openings, and garage doors. The yard is enclosed by a wall containing an opening flanked by piers with ball finials.
4 Cross Street; 53.92793°N 1.38603°W		Early 19th century	A house, later a shop, in gritstone on a plinth, with paired gutter brackets and a Welsh slate roof. There are two storeys and two bays. In the right bay, steps lead up to s doorway with a blind fanlight and a wedge lintel, and to the left is a bow window. The upper floor contains sash windows with wedge lintels.
27 and 29 High Street and 2 Cross Street; 53.92798°N 1.38585°W		Early 19th century	A group of houses, later shops and offices, in magnesian limestone, with paired gutter brackets, and a Welsh slate roof, hipped at the left end and gabled with copings on the right. There are three storeys, three bays on the front, two on the left return, and a two-storey two-bay wing beyond. On the front are two shop fronts; on the left dating from the early 20th-century that has a central doorway with a fanlight, and a wooden canopy on consoles, that on the right modern. In the upper floors are sash windows, those in the middle bay blind. In the left return is a doorway with a fanlight, and the wing contains a shop window.
19 and 21 Market Place; 53.92798°N 1.38712°W		Early 19th century	A pair of houses, later shops, in magnesian limestone, with an eaves cornice on paired brackets, and a Welsh slate roof, hipped at the right end and gabled on the left. There are three storeys, five bays on the front and three on the right return, and two rear wings. On the front, the left two bays contain a modern shop front, and in the other bays is a shop front from about 1900, consisting of a doorway with a fanlight on the left, and to the right double shop windows with a central entrance, all under an entablature on consoles. The windows in the upper floor are a mix of sashes and casements, and in the right return is a tripartite window with a segmental arch.
21–25 Westgate; 53.92927°N 1.38929°W		Early 19th century	A row of three cottages in magnesian limestone with a pantile roof. There are two storeys and four bays. The windows are a mix of sashes, some sliding, and casements and there is a small canted bay window on a cantilevered sill.
The Brunswick; 53.92796°N 1.38555°W		Early 19th century	The public house is in magnesian limestone on a plinth, with paired gutter brackets, and a hipped Welsh slate roof. There are three storeys and fronts of three bays. The doorway has a fluted surround, a fanlight, and a cornice on consoles. The windows are sashes, those in the ground floor with aprons, and two windows on the front are blind.
Remains of West Lodge and wall 53.92396°N 1.38513°W		Early 19th century	The ruins of a former lodge to the Wetherby Grange Estate are in magnesian limestone on a rusticated plinth, with a moulded cornice and a balustered parapet. There is a single storey and three bays, and the building is without a roof. The middle bay projects and has a stylobate of four semicircular steps, and a Doric distyle in antis portico with a plain frieze. In the side bays are recesses containing blind windows with moulded sills and architraves. To the left is a wall ending in a rusticated pier, and beyond that is a quadrant wall ending in a square pier with a concave cap.
Wetherby Methodist Church; 53.92917°N 1.38705°W		1829	The church is in magnesian limestone on a plinth, with bands, paired gutter brackets, and a hipped Welsh slate roof. There are two storeys, fronts of three and two bays, and a rear wing with lean-tos. In the centre is a doorway with a fanlight, and the windows are sashes. Above the doorway is an inscribed plaque.
6 and 8 Scott Lane; 53.92799°N 1.38787°W		c. 1830	A pair of mirror-image houses in magnesian limestone with a Welsh slate roof. There are two storeys and each house has two bays. The doorways are in the centre and have fanlights, and the windows are sashes, all with wedge lintels.
The Three Legs; 53.92776°N 1.38706°W		Early to mid 19th century	A public house in painted stone, with paired gutter brackets and a slate roof. There are two storeys and an attic, and three bays. In the right bay is a rusticated basket carriage arch with an inserted recessed doorway, and elsewhere are sash windows with flat-arched heads.
Wetherby House; 53.92768°N 1.38704°W		Early to mid 19th century	A house on a corner site, later used for other purposes, the front is in sandstone, the left return is in gritstone, it has paired gutter brackets, and the roof is slated and hipped on the left. There are two storeys and fronts of three bays. In the centre of the front is a doorway with fluted half-columns, a semicircular fanlight, a triglyph frieze, and a cornice. Flanking the doorway are bow windows, and the other windows are sashes.
St James' Church; 53.92996°N 1.38632°W		1839–41	The chancel of the church was extended in about 1876. The church is built in sandstone with a Welsh slate roof, and consists of a nave with a south porch, a taller narrower chancel with a south vestry and a north organ chamber, and a west tower. The tower has angle buttresses with gablets, a south doorway with a chamfered surround and a hood mould, clock faces in the west and south fronts, a corbelled cornice, and a parapet with blind quatrefoils and pinnacle bases. Most of the windows are lancets, the east window has five stepped lancets divided by shafts, and above the porch is a wheel window.
Town Hall and wall 53.92841°N 1.38662°W		1845	The town hall is in sandstone, with a hipped Welsh slate roof, and two storeys. There is a T-shaped plan, consisting of an entrance range with a front of five bays, and a wider taller rear range with fronts of two and four bays. On the front is a three-bay porch, the middle bay projecting, with rusticated pilasters, and an entablature with a plain frieze and pediment, and a doorway with a fanlight. The flanking windows are casements, and the other windows on the front are sashes. At the top is a modillioned cornice, and a pediment with a clock face in the tympanum. In the rear block are rusticated quoins and a sill band. The upper floor windows have round-arched heads in recesses, with an impost band, archivolts, and keystones. In front of the building are low quadrant walls with end piers and massive copings.
Barleyfield Road Bridge; 53.93519°N 1.38989°W		1847	The bridge carries Barleyfield Road over a former railway line. It was built by the York and North Midland Railway, and is in gritstone with a brick soffit. The bridge consists of a single segmental skew arch, with voussoirs and a soffit impost band. The parapet is coped, and there are projecting end piers.
Quarry Hill Bridge; 53.93598°N 1.39265°W		1847	The bridge carries a track over a former railway line. It was built by the York and North Midland Railway, and is in gritstone with a brick soffit. The bridge consists of a single segmental skew arch, with voussoirs and a soffit impost band. The parapet is coped, and there are projecting end piers.
Railway engine shed 53.93288°N 1.38100°W		1847	The former railway engine shed is in magnesian limestone with gritstone dressings, on a plinth, with a Welsh slate roof, hipped on the left and gabled on the right. There is one storey, and fronts of three and two bays. On the north side are three round-arched openings with an impost band and raised keystones. On the south side are horizontally-sliding doors with a lunette above.
6 Cross Street; 53.92794°N 1.38614°W		Mid 19th century	A shop with a dwelling above, it is in magnesian limestone with pilaster strips on plinths, bands, a moulded eaves cornice, and a hipped Welsh slate roof. There are three storeys, two bays on the front, and four on the left return. On the front, the ground floor contains a shop front with a cornice on consoles. In the left return is a doorway with a fanlight, and casement windows, and the upper floors contain sash windows, some of them blind.
66 North Street; 53.93116°N 1.38411°W		Mid 19th century	A house, later an office, in magnesian limestone on a plinth, with a roof partly tiled, and partly in Welsh slate. There are two storeys, three bays, and a rear wing. In the centre is a doorway with a fanlight and a cornice, it is flanked by casement windows, and the upper floor contains sash windows.
The Manor House; 53.92933°N 1.38553°W		Mid 19th century	The house is in sandstone on a plinth, with paired gutter brackets, and a Welsh slate roof, hipped on the right. There are two storeys and four bays, with a basket-arched carriage entrance in the left bay. The doorway has an architrave, a fanlight, a pulvinated frieze, and a cornice. The windows are sashes with lintels tooled as voussoirs; those in the ground floor are tripartite with mullions.
The Old Vicarage; 53.92736°N 1.38260°W	—	Mid 19th century	The vicarage, later two private houses, is in magnesian limestone with a Welsh slate roof. There are two storeys, a front of three bays, a recessed bay on the right, and two bays in the left return. The doorways have cornices, and the windows are sashes with wedge lintels.
Milepost near Audby Lane; 53.93370°N 1.37689°W		Late 19th century	The milestone is on the north side of York Road at its junction with The Beeches. It is in gritstone with cast iron overlay, and has a triangular plan and a rounded top. On the top is inscribed "COLLINGHAM & YORK R0AD" and "WETHERBY" and on the sides are the distances to Wetherby, Collingham, Leeds, and York.
Milepost near Swinnow Hill; 53.93772°N 1.35205°W		Late 19th century	The milestone is on the south side of York Road (B1224) to the east of Wetherby, near the entrance to Swinnow Hill. It is in gritstone with cast iron overlay, and has a triangular plan and a rounded top. On the top is inscribed "COLLINGHAM & YORK R0AD" and "WETHERBY" and on the sides are the distances to Wetherby, Collingham, Leeds, and York.
