= St James' Parish Church, Wetherby =

St James' Parish Church
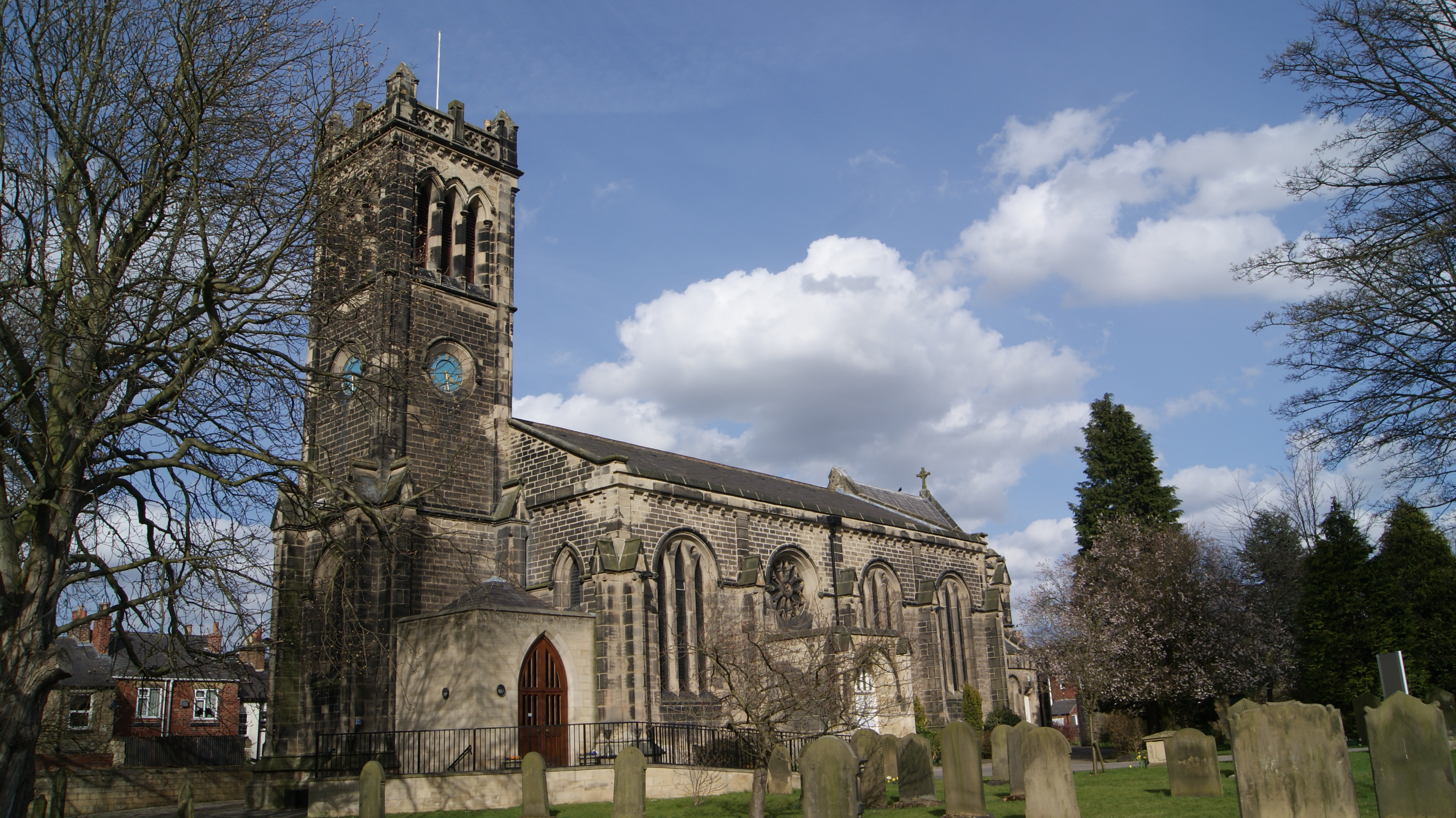
- Parish Church of St James
- St James' Parish Church
- 53.9298°N 1.3864°W
- OS grid reference: SE 40395 48376
- Location: Wetherby, Leeds, West Yorkshire
- Country: England
- Denomination: Church of England
- Website: St James Wetherby

History
- Dedication: St James

Administration
- Province: York
- Diocese: Leeds
- Archdeaconry: Leeds
- Deanery: Wetherby
- Parish: Wetherby

St James' Parish Church is an Anglican parish church serving the parish of Wetherby with Linton in Wetherby, West Yorkshire, England.

== History ==
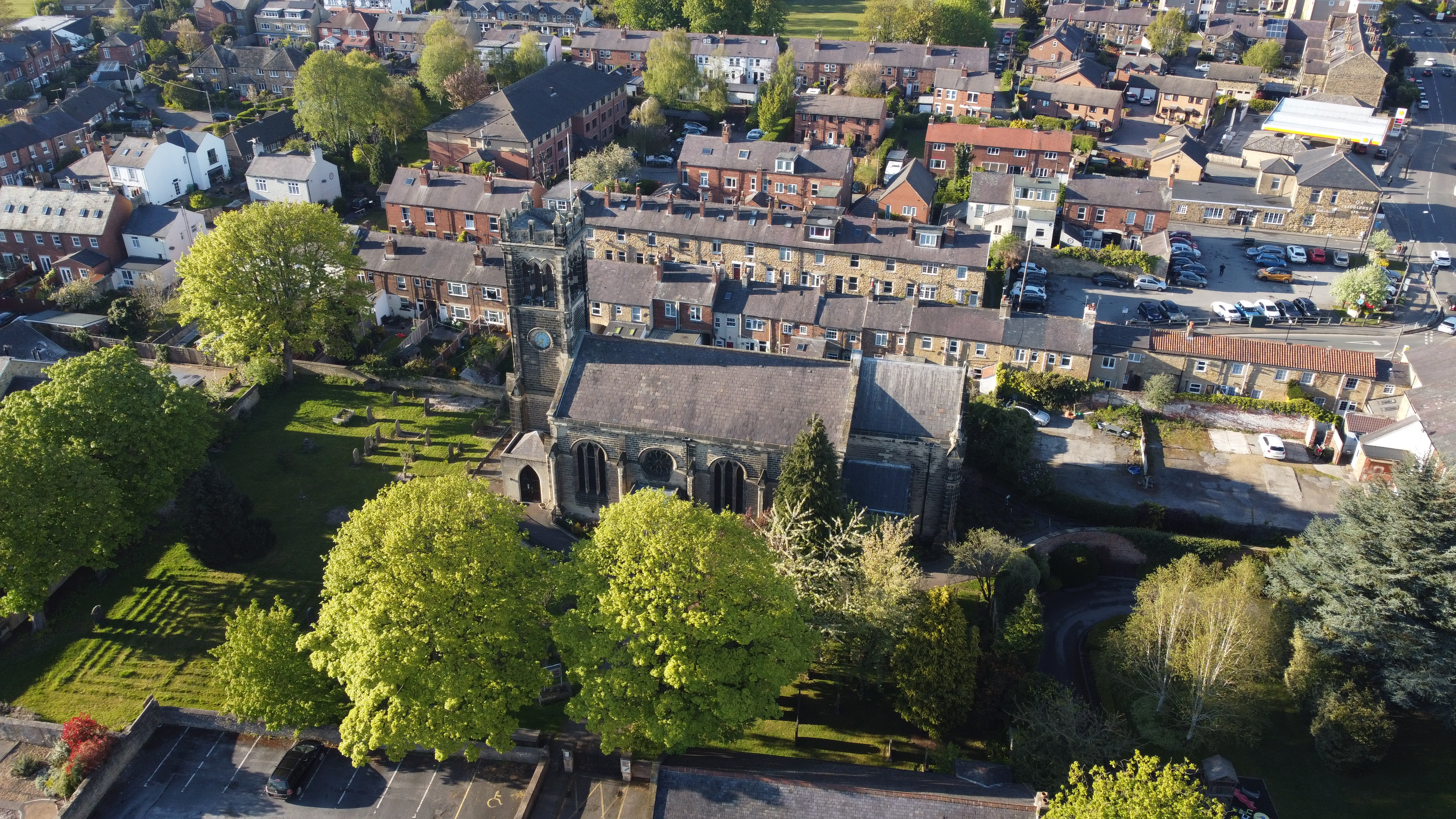
An aerial view of the church

Wetherby was a chapelry in the ancient parish of Spofforth until its parish church was built in 1842. Before then the chapel of ease was served by clergy from the mother church in Spofforth. A chapel was mentioned in 1301 and again in 1546. A dilapidated thatched chapel in the Market Square was demolished in 1760. It was replaced by another in 1763 and that too was demolished in 1845.

Curate, William Raby of Spofforth came to Wetherby in 1833 and embarked on two building schemes, St James' Church and Wetherby Town Hall. On 3 April 1838, a meeting of civic and ecclesiastical figures agreed to build a church with a graveyard. The backers included two brewers, two surgeons, two solicitors, two innkeepers, the curate, a wine and spirit merchant, a farmer, a craftsman, a non-provincial dealer, a postmaster, and a 'gentleman who between them owned 21% of the land in Wetherby and leased another 25%'. Each subscribed at least £20.

The site for the church occupied three roods of barley field provided by Edwin Greenwood of Keighley, the principal non-resident purchaser at the great sale of Wetherby in 1824. An access road was provided from the market place and Great North Road on land provided by John F. Barlow of Aldfield House.

The first stones were laid on 1 April 1839 by Quentin Rhodes, who contributed significantly towards the initial cost of £4000. The church was built from stone quarried at Collingham. The church was consecrated by Longley, Bishop of Ripon on 1 February 1842 and cost of £4,300. The 1877 the church was refurbished at a cost of £1000 raised by local subscriptions.

Not long after completion, 60 residents petitioned the Bishop of Ripon complaining about the curate, Raby, and his allocation of pews and other abuses by his 'masterful hand'.

=== Church on the Corner ===
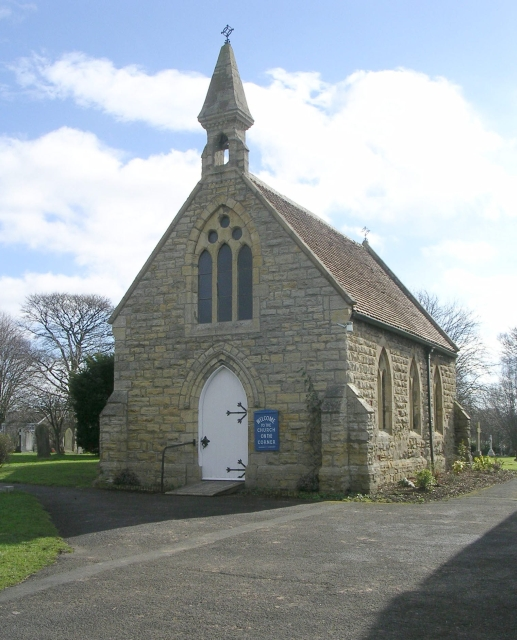
Church on the Corner

Limited burial space in the churchyard resulted in the provision of a large cemetery on the corner of Hallfield Lane. It has two similar chapels; the east chapel is used for St James' Church on the Corner while the other is the cemetery chapel. The cemetery is managed by Wetherby Town Council.

== Architecture ==
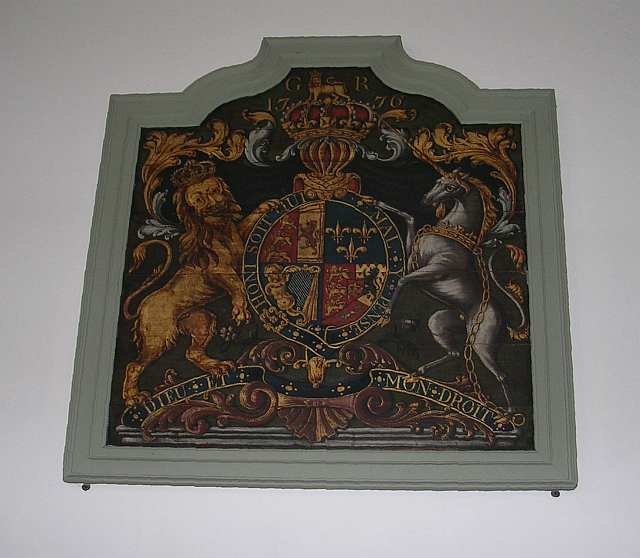
Royal Coat of Arms

The church is aligned east-to-west and has a west tower. The tower is tall and in two stages with blue clocks in west, north and south faced in deeply-chamfered recesses with hood moulds. There are three light louvred belfry openings with hood moulds. The nave and tower are constructed of sandstone and were completed in 1842 in the Gothic revival style. The chancel was added in 1877, and a porch was built in the 1990s. The north side has access to the crypt. The south side has the old and new entrances and a rose window. The chancel has a lean-to south vestry with exterior shouldered-headed door and a two light window with hood moulds. The east window is of five lights and of ornate stained glass, each light divided by shafts while the bays have stepped three-light windows with round-arched hood moulds.

Pinnacles on the tower were removed in 1939 after they became unsafe. They were replaced by capstones. A porch was added in the 1990s, and a ramp providing wheelchair access.

A former Sunday School building on Church Street that opened in 1895 is rented to local organisations. This is stone built with a pitched welsh-slate roof.

=== Interior ===
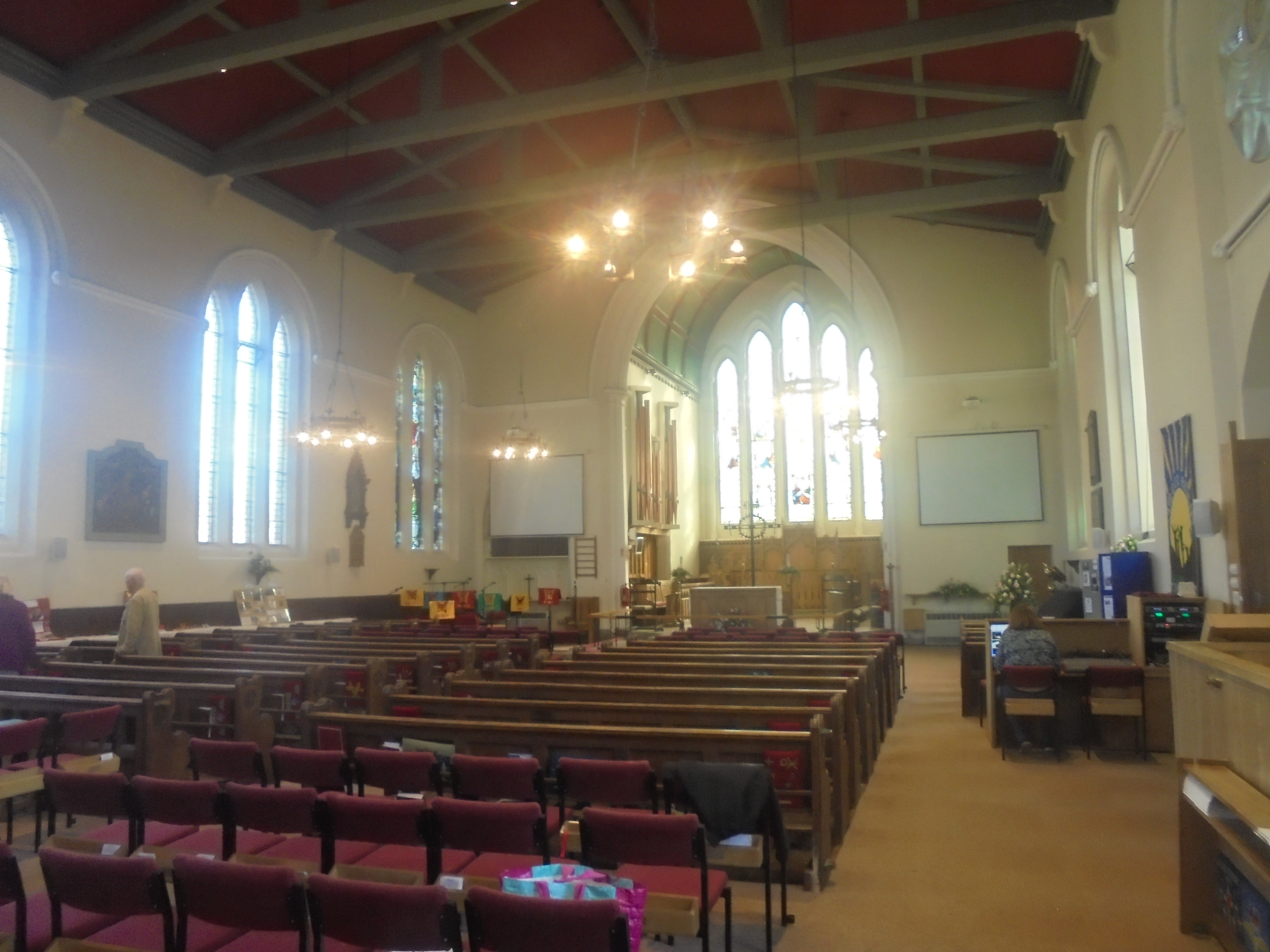
Interior

The church has a treble-chamfered tower arch with stops to cover the nave windows. There is a tall moulded chancel arch. The chancel has a painted panel ceiling with crossing wooden beams running in a north-south direction. There are hanging pendant lamps in the nave. The church contains furniture by Robert Thompson.

== See also ==
- Listed buildings in Wetherby
