= Louis Frederick Roslyn =

British sculptor

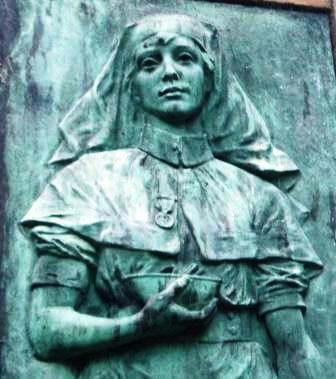
- Darwen War Memorial, Bold Venture Park, Darwen, unveiled 1921.
- Born: Louis Frederick Roselieb; 13 July 1878; London, England
- Died: 1934
- Education: Westminster City & Guilds; Royal Academy Schools
- Known for: Sculpture

Louis Frederick Roslyn (born Roselieb; 13 July 1878 – 1940), also known as Louis Fritz Roselieb, was a British sculptor noted for his World War I war memorials, portrait sculptures and bronze statuettes. Before beginning his career, he studied at Westminster City & Guilds College and the Royal Academy Schools. He enlisted in the Royal Flying Corps in 1915, but for medical or other reasons was put on the reserve until 1917 when he served at the School of Military Aeronautics and subsequently made Lieutenant. During his military service that he changed his name to Roslyn.

== Biography ==
Louis Frederick Roselieb, later Roslyn, was born on 13 July 1878 in Lambeth, London. His father was George Louis Roselieb, a German sculptor who came to England from Germany to work. (Note: At the National Archives in Kew, England and under reference HO 144/407/B23762 are papers which cover George Louis Roselieb's Naturalisation. At the time of his naturalisation, Roselieb had lived in England for 23 years, having been born in Hanover on 20 March 1897 and had practised as an architectural sculptor and carver. At the time of naturalisation he had two sons, Louis Fitz (sic) Vai Roselieb (18 years of age) and Gustav Karl Roselieb (16 years of age). He worked at the Clayton Works in Kennington. At the time of naturalisation Roselieb’s address was in Clapham.)

Louis Roselieb attended Westminster City & Guilds College before entering the Royal Academy Schools, where in 1905 he was won a two year Landseer Scholarship for sculpture. Once he started to practice, his studio was located at "The Studio" in Clapham, London.

From 1906 to 1916 Roslyn worked at The Standard Plating Works in Rosebury Avenue. He was a "Sculptor and Electra Metallurgist". He enlisted in the Royal Flying Corps in 1915 under the name of Louis Fritz Roselieb. At the time of his enlistment he was 38 years and 5 months old and his height was 5 feet 6.1/2 inches. His wife was Ethel Roselieb and they had three children, Claude Frederick (12 years), Edward George (9 years) and John Bleckly (3 1/2 years).

At some point during his military service Roselieb changed his surname to Roslyn. It is not entirely clear when this decision was made; the statue of Edward VII had been done under the name Roselieb in 1911, whereas his work on the Imperial Buildings in 1914 was signed Roslyn.

Roslyn executed sculptural work for many war memorials in England and Wales. He also executed war memorials for Trinidad in the West Indies and for Cape Town in South Africa. The Duchess of York and Duchess of Connaught were among those of whom he was commissioned to do portrait busts. He was a Member and then Fellow of the Royal Society of British Sculptors. His membership commenced 1914 and his Fellowship commenced in 1923.

=== Military service ===
The young Roselieb, who often added "Vai" to his full name, enlisted in the Royal Flying Corps on 12 December 1915 and he described himself when enlisting as "a sculptor and living in Clapham" and to be working as "a sculptor and electra metallurgist". Rosyln was passed as fit to work on "electro deposition of various metals for use in connection with Aero Engines" and was deemed medically "fit for service anywhere but not combatant service". In his records, and with no explanation, it was stated that Lord Derby did not want Roslyn called up before 1 June 1917.

Having enlisted, Roselieb was put on the reserve, and in June 1917 was called to the School of Military Aeronautics, Royal Flying Corps, Reading, as an Equipment Officer, 3rd Class on probation. As a result of this appointment Roselieb was gazetted as a Temporary 2nd Lieutenant under the name Louis Frederick Roslyn. Subsequently he was promoted to Lieutenant.

== Selected public works ==
=== 1900-1915 ===
Image	Title / subject	Location and coordinates	Date	Type	Material	Dimensions	Designation	Wikidata	Notes
	Boer War memorial	St Peter and St Paul Church, Tonbridge, Kent	1904	Tablet	Bronze				
More images	Two figures	6-7 St George Street, London	1904	Two sculptures	Bronze		Grade II	Q27083086	
More images	Memorial to Sir Wilfrid Lawson	Aspatria, Cumbria	1908	Statue of St George and the Dragon on pedestal with 4 tablets	Bronze, sandstone & granite		Grade II	Q26527887	Tablets depict Peace, Temperance, a bust of Lawson and an account of his life.
More images	Edward VII	Tooting Broadway, London	1911	Statue on pedestal with plaques	Bronze and stone		Grade II	Q21578727	
More images	Industry, Transport, Communications and Commerce	Norway House, Cockspur Street, London	1914	Four relief sculptures	Stone				
		Imperial Buildings, Kingsway, London	1914/1915	Two architectural sculptures					
	Commerce, Art and Science	70-71 New Bond Street, London	1914-1915	Three architectural sculptures	Stone				

=== 1916-1920 ===
Image	Title / subject	Location and coordinates	Date	Type	Material	Dimensions	Designation	Wikidata	Notes
	Memorial to John Horne Tooke	St Mary's Church, Ealing, London	1919	Tablet	Bronze				
	Memorial to Brigadier General Frederick Lumsden V.C., C.B., D.S.O	Royal Marines Memorial Garden, Eastney, Portsmouth	1920	Obelisk with relief plaque	Stone & bronze				
More images	War memorial	Little Common, Bexhill-on-Sea	1920	Wheel cross	Granite			Q83191267	
More images	War memorial	Buxton, Derbyshire	1920	Statue on obelisk	Bronze & stone	8M tall	Grade II	Q26549172	
More images	War memorial	Bexhill-on-Sea, East Sussex	1920	Statue on obelisk	Bronze & Portland stone	8.5m tall	Grade II	Q83191268	

=== 1921-1925 ===
Image	Title / subject	Location and coordinates	Date	Type	Material	Dimensions	Designation	Wikidata	Notes
More images	War memorial	Boggart Hole Clough, Blackley, Manchester	1921	Statue on pedestal	Bronze & stone	10m tall	Grade II	Q26503159	Originally erected with 4 surrounding figures, now no longer in place
More images	War memorial	Bold Venture Park, Darwen, Lancashire	1921	Statue on pedestal with panels	Bronze & stone		Grade II*	Q26328056	The 3 life-size panels on the pedestal depict a soldier, sailor and a nurse.
More images	War memorial	Greengates, West Yorkshire	1921	Statue on pedestal	Bronze & Portland stone		Grade II	Q26670303	Architect;- Ernest Wright. One of three similar compositions in the area, the others being at Calverley and at Wetherby, which also reference classical depictions of Athena as the "bringer of victory".
	Scottish Nurses memorial	St Giles Cathedral, Edinburgh	1921	Relief plaque	Bronze				
More images	Wetherby War Memorial	Wetherby Bridge, Wetherby	1922	Statue on pedestal	Bronze & stone		Grade II	Q26599909	
More images	War memorial	Victoria Park, Calverley, Leeds	1922	Statue on pedestal	Bronze & Portland stone		Grade II	Q26577309	
More images	War memorial	Foster Park, Denholme, Bradford	1922	Statue on pedestal with panels	Bronze & stone		Grade II	Q26600597	
More images	War memorial	Oswaldtwistle, Lancashire	1922	Statue on pedestal with supporting figures	Bronze & stone		Grade II*	Q26501364	
	War memorial	St Mary the Virgin Church, Swanley, Kent	1922	Statue on pedestal	Bronze & Portland stone		Grade II	Q26671528	The names recorded include that of Staff-Paymaster Joseph Gedge, the first British officer killed in action in World War 1. A "Gedge Medal" named in his honour was subsequently issued.
More images	War memorial	Castle Gardens, Clitheroe, Lancashire	1923	Statue on pedestal	Bronze & granite	6m tall	Grade II		
More images	War memorial	Victoria Square, Holyhead, Anglesey	1923	Cenotaph with reliefs & panels	Granite & bronze	4.8m high	Grade II	Q29492569	
More images	War memorial	Basingstoke, Hampshire	1923	Statue on pedestal	Bronze and Portland stone		Grade II	Q26678062	Architect;- J Arthur Smith.
More images	War memorial	Slaidburn, Lancashire	1923	Statue on pedestal	Bronze & stone	6.3m tall	Grade II	Q26327707	
More images	War memorial	Tottenham, London	1923	Statue on pedestal	Bronze & granite	15m tall	Grade II	Q26314635	
	War memorial	New Tredegar, South Wales	1923	Statue group on pedestal	Marble & red granite		Grade II	Q29502441	Attributed to Roslyn
More images	War memorial	The Promenade, Portstewart, Northern Ireland	1924	Statue on pedestal	Bronze & stone	6m tall			
More images	War memorial	The Green, Edmonton, London,	1924	Cenotaph	Cornish granite		Grade II	Q59140518	
More images	War memorial	Haslingden, Lancashire	1924	Statue on pedestal	Bronze & stone		Grade II	Q26457153	
More images	Port Talbot War Memorial	Memorial Park, Port Talbot	1925	Statue on pedestal with relief plaques	Bronze and granite		Grade II*	Q17740925	
	War memorial	Kenfig Hill, South Wales	1925	Statue on column	Bronze and granite		Grade II	Q29496610	

=== 1926 and later ===
Image	Title / subject	Location and coordinates	Date	Type	Material	Dimensions	Designation	Wikidata	Notes
	War memorial	St David's Church, Maesteg, South Wales	1926	Two figure group on plinth	Bronze and granite	6m high	Grade II	Q29495986	
More images	War memorial	Harpur Hill, Derbyshire	1928	Plaque on cairn	Bronze and stone		Grade II	Q26669979	
More images	War memorial	Library Gardens, Rawtenstall, Lancashire	1929	Cenotaph with relief panels	Stone & bronze	5.25m tall	Grade II*	Q26263418	
	Howitzer & artillery themes	Artillery House, Artillery Row, London	1928-1930	Architectural sculpture	Stone				
	Memorial to Dr James Mackenzie	Thompson Park, Burnley, Lancashire	1931	Bust and surround	Bronze & stone		Grade II	Q26537575	

== Other works ==
- Memorial Fountain to Robert Fenwick and Harry Pollard Ashby, Wandle Park. Surrey, unveiled 1911. Roslyn worked on the classical water carrier, no longer in place, added to the fountain. It is fashioned in Italian marble, with granite steps and a Portland Stone base.
- Bust of Sir Wilfred Lawson, Bart, current whereabouts unknown, exhibited at Royal Hibernian Academy's Annual Exhibition of 1908.
- A work entitled Case of Medals-Bronze was exhibited at Royal Hibernian Academy's Annual Exhibition of 1908.
- In 1906 a bronze relief, Dawn, current whereabouts unknown, was exhibited at the Corporation of Manchester Art Gallery on the occasion of their Twenty-Fourth Autumn Exhibition. The piece was priced at £2 2s.
- Head of a Young Girl, 1908, whereabouts unknown, exhibited at the Royal Hibernian Academy Annual Exhibition.
- Prometheus Unbound, listed as being shown at the Royal Academy from 1906-1910 but its present whereabouts is unknown.
- The Struggle, Whereabouts unknown, exhibited at the 1912 Royal Academy Exhibition.
- A 1921 bronze memorial plaque to the 254 men of the Oddfellows society of Ipswich who died in the First World War
- The Imperial War Museum in London holds a number of busts of British military officers by Roslyn in its collection.
