= Get Santa =

2014 British Christmas comedy film

- Theatrical release poster
- Directed by: Christopher Smith
- Written by: Christopher Smith
- Produced by: Liza Marshall
- Starring: Jim Broadbent; Rafe Spall; Ewen Bremner; Warwick Davis; Stephen Graham; Joanna Scanlan; Jodie Whittaker; Kit Connor
- Cinematography: Christopher Ross
- Edited by: Stuart Gazzard
- Music by: Ilan Eshkeri
- Production companies: Altitude; Scott Free Films; BFI; Screen Yorkshire; Ingenious
- Distributed by: Warner Bros. Pictures (United Kingdom); Wrekin Hill Entertainment (United States); Universal Pictures (Sweden)
- Release dates: 5 December 2014 (United Kingdom); 12 December 2014 (United States)
- Running time: 102 minutes
- Countries: United Kingdom; United States; Sweden
- Language: English
- Box office: $4.8 million

Get Santa is a 2014 Christmas comedy film directed and written by Christopher Smith, and produced by Liza Marshall. The film stars Jim Broadbent, Rafe Spall, Ewen Bremner, Warwick Davis, Stephen Graham, Joanna Scanlan, Jodie Whittaker, and Kit Connor in his theatrical film debut.

== Plot ==
A few days before Christmas, Steve Anderson, a former getaway driver, is released on parole from prison, with his parole officer, Ruth, informing him that she will consider any occasion where he misses his meetings with her as a violation of his parole and send him back to prison. Amid reports of reindeer wandering the streets of London, Steve is surprised when his son, Tom, calls him to claim that he has found Santa in his family's garden shed. Steve responds to the call, but although Santa mentions a time Steve saw a shooting star as a child, he dismisses 'Santa' as a madman and sends him out of the shed. Alone, Santa tries to retrieve his reindeer from Battersea dogs home, but is caught when he tries to catapult one of them out and is sent to Lambeth prison.

The next morning, Steve appears for his first scheduled day with Tom, but Tom refuses to go anywhere but to see Santa at prison. Santa instructs Steve on how to find his reindeer, and hence his crashed sleigh, and in return Steve sends him to the barber who provides him with a few pointers on how to cope in prison. While Santa is asked to act as the Father Christmas for the local prison party, Steve finds the field in Richmond Park where the reindeer have been taken, with Tom establishing which reindeer is the leader, Dasher, as Dasher communicates through flatulence. They are able to find the sleigh, but when Steve calls Santa to update him, he accidentally releases all of the bright green magic dust the sleigh needs to fly.

Stuck for options, Steve agrees to go to Hermey's Tower in Suffolk, where Santa informs him that he will find help, based on a book in the sleigh's glove compartment, despite this trip meaning that Steve will miss his parole hearing. Despite such delays as difficulty hitch-hiking and a close call that forces them to steal costumes from a pantomime, they are able to reach Hermey's Tower, but are unable to work out what to do next.

Back at the prison, Santa manages to convince the other prisoners of his identity when they see letters hit the window addressed to Santa, followed by Santa recounting some of the last presents he left for the prisoners when they were children. However, when parole officer Ruth comes to prison to report Steve has missed his parole hearing, she not only identifies him as the man who stole Dasher, but also identifies Santa as 'Harry Mitchell', who was arrested while trying to climb down a chimney over twenty years ago but escaped en route to jail. However, the prisoners begin to acknowledge the truth when an emergency news report reveals that Australian children have woken up with no presents in their stockings.

With Santa transferred to solitary, Steve contemplates giving up, but Tom is able to translate a clue in the book to work out how to open Hermey's Tower, which is one of several receiving towers that pick up the letters to Santa and divert them to Lapland. Travelling through the letter-tunnel, Steve and Tom reach Elf City, where Steve convinces the elves to let him use an old sleigh to rescue Santa from prison while deploying a squirrel called Oswald to release the other reindeer, Steve arguing that those children who have woken up without presents may simply find them in other areas. They see that the green magic powder is used for creating the northern lights, that the reindeer walk on in the skies. Reaching the prison, they are able to use a magic slinky to enlarge a small chimney so that Steve and Tom can enter the prison.

At the same time, Santa is about to be transferred to solitary, but attempts a break-out with the aid of a dwarf prisoner known as 'Sally', culminating in a fight in the prison gym that ends when Santa punches the guard responsible for supervising the transfer when he says he hates Christmas. As Santa and Sally attempt to break out through a tunnel, Steve writes a letter to Santa so that it will lead him and Tom to Santa, where they intercept Allison, Tom's mother, as she drives to the prison looking for Tom. When the police discover the car, Allison is forced to go along with the request to take them to a park, Santa buying time by using a gun loaded with reindeer droppings as a distraction.

They reach the park where Oswald has reassembled the sleigh and the reindeer, Santa inviting Sally to accompany him, just before the police and Ruth arrive. As Ruth asks why Santa would choose Steve to help him, Santa notes that Steve is commendable because he never stops trying, and reassures Tom that adults can make mistakes but just need a chance to believe in the magic of Christmas. With that, Santa takes off in the sleigh and departs for his night's work, wishing them all a Merry Christmas and thanking Steve and Tom for their help, expressing faith that the police will let him off once they see the truth. Christmas was finally saved for the night.

== Cast ==
- Jim Broadbent as Harry Mitchell / Santa Claus
- Rafe Spall as Steve Anderson
- Kit Connor as Tom Anderson
- Stephen Graham as Barber
- Ewen Bremner as PC Finkerton
- Jodie Whittaker as Alison Anderson
- Michael Walter as Entwhistle
- Warwick Davis as Sally
- Joanna Scanlan as Ruth
- Nonso Anozie as Knuckles
- Perry Benson as Jimbo
- Matt King as Brian
- Joshua McGuire as Tony
- Hera Hilmar as WPC Boyle
- Craig Fackrell as The Haircut
- Bjarne Henriksen as Lars
- Gerry Cole as prisoner
- Neil Ashton as prisoner

== Production ==
On 12 May 2011, THR announced that Ridley Scott's Scott Free Productions was producing an "untitled Christmas family film", Christopher Smith was set to write and then direct the film. On 8 May 2013, Jim Broadbent joined the cast to play the lead role of Santa Claus in the film, produced by Liza Marshall. In November 2013, BFI Film Fund supported the film's production with £1 million, set to begin filming in early 2014.

On 16 January 2014, while filming was under way, more cast was added to the film, including Rafe Spall, Stephen Graham, Ewen Bremner, Jodie Whittaker, Warwick Davis, Joanna Scanlan, and Nonso Anozie. Warner Bros. released the film in United Kingdom, while Altitude Film Sales handled the international sales. A nine-year-old character was announced to be played by Kit Connor. The other cast includes Perry Benson, Matt King, Joshua McGuire and Hera Hilmar.

=== Filming ===
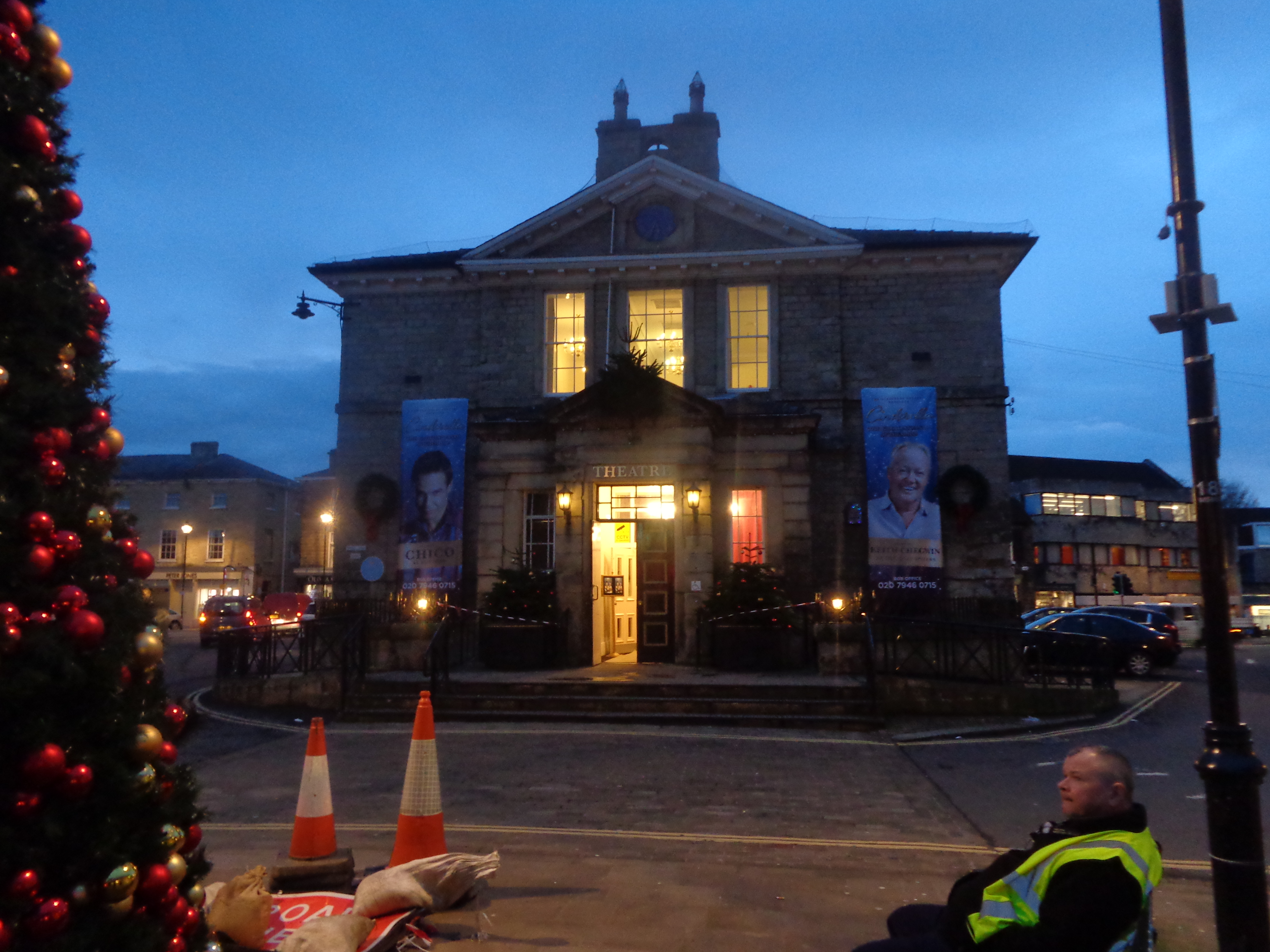
Wetherby Town Hall masquerading as the Albatross Theatre for the filming of Get Santa, February 2014.

The shooting of the film began on 16 January 2014, in London and Yorkshire. Other locations included Leeds, Wetherby, Lancaster Castle and Bradford.

=== Music ===
Ilan Eshkeri composed the music for the film. Universal Music Group released a soundtrack album on 3 December 2014.

The Saturdays did a cover of The Waitresses's song, "Christmas Wrapping" for the film, which was played in the film and the trailer for the film.

== Release ==
On 27 January 2014, an image of the film was released. The film was released in the United Kingdom on 5 December 2014.

== Reception ==
On review aggregator Rotten Tomatoes, the film holds an approval rating of 78% based on 27 reviews, with an average rating of 6.2/10. The website's critics consensus reads: "With a bombastic performance from Jim Broadbent, Get Santa brilliantly captures the joys of the Christmas holiday." On Metacritic, the film has a weighted average score of 52 out of 100, based on 6 critics, indicating "mixed or average reviews".

== See also ==
- 2014 in film
- List of British films of 2014
- List of Christmas films
- Santa Claus in film
