= Micklethwaite, Wetherby =

Area in Wetherby, West Yorkshire, England

Coordinates: 53.925°N 1.387°W

Micklethwaite
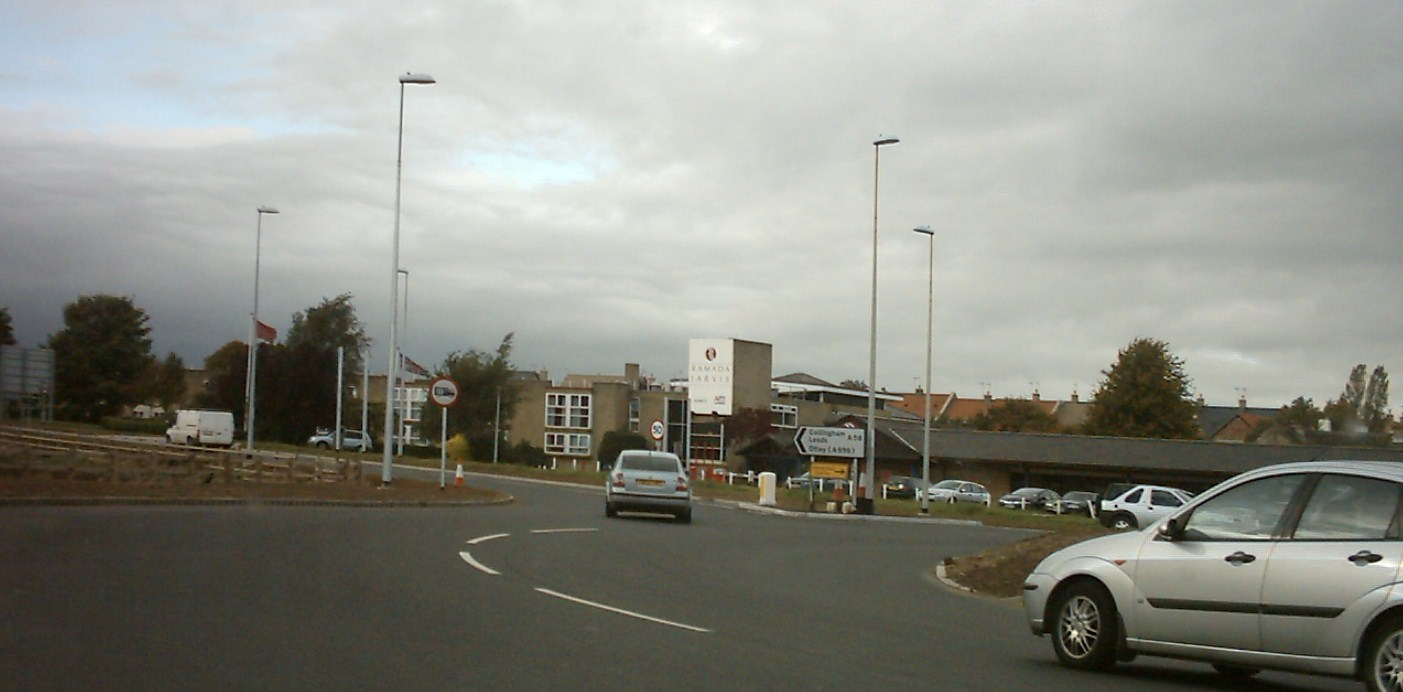
- The A58 roundabout in Micklethwaite looking towards the Ramada Jarvis Hotel

- Location within West Yorkshire
- Civil parish: Wetherby
- Metropolitan borough: Leeds
- Metropolitan county: West Yorkshire
- Region: Yorkshire and the Humber
- Country: England
- Sovereign state: United Kingdom
- Police: West Yorkshire
- Fire: West Yorkshire
- Ambulance: Yorkshire

Micklethwaite is an area of Wetherby, on the south bank of the River Wharfe, in the Leeds district, in the county of West Yorkshire, England. It was once a separate village but has been incorporated into Wetherby. In 2004 150 houses were constructed on Micklethwaite Farm. It is the location of Wetherby's police station, the former magistrates' court, the leisure centre, Wetherby Athletic Football Club and a Mercure Hotel.

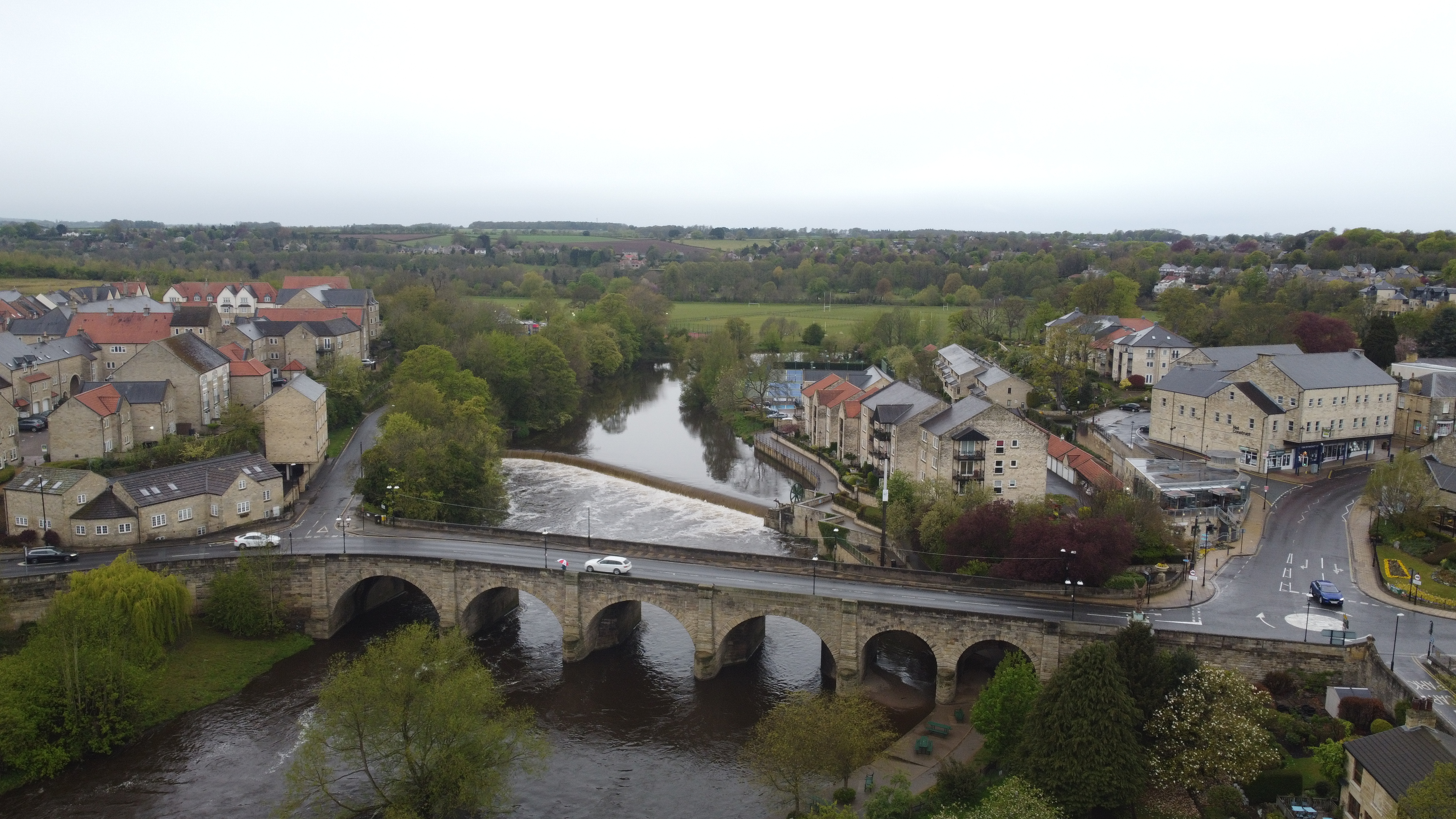
Micklethwaite (left) sits opposite Wetherby Town Centre (right) connected by Wetherby Bridge (centre).

Micklethwaite had a public house, the Drover Inn which is now a private residence. With the advent of the railway, cattle were no longer driven over the bridge and the pub changed its name to the Spotted Ox. A barracks was built in 1825 to house the Yorkshire Hussars in case of civil disturbances anticipated in Leeds at the time of the Chartists.

Micklethwaite is considered an upmarket area. Any part of Wetherby south of the River Wharfe is Micklethwaite.

== History ==
Micklethwaite was formerly a township in the parish of Collingham, in 1866 Micklethwaite became a separate civil parish, on 1 April 1937 the parish was abolished and merged with Wetherby. In 1931 the parish had a population of 86.

== People ==
Karen Drury, best known for her role as Susannah Morrisey in Channel 4 soap, Brookside grew up in Micklethwaite.
