= Wetherby Methodist Church =

Methodist church in West Yorkshire, England

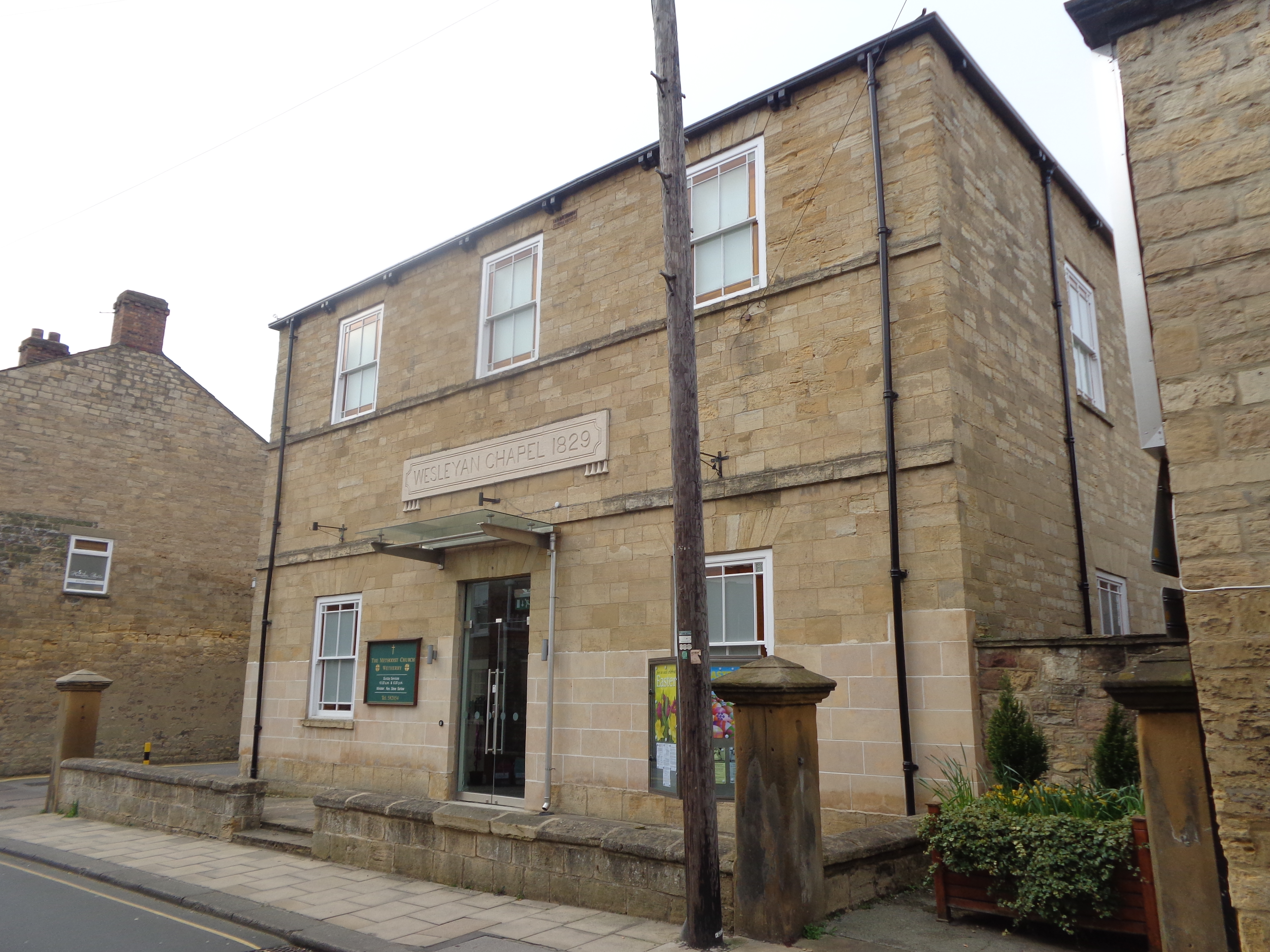
- Wetherby Methodist Church
- Wetherby Methodist Church
- 53°55′45″N 1°23′13″W
- OS grid reference: SE 40347 48284
- Location: Wetherby, Leeds, West Yorkshire
- Country: England
- Denomination: Methodist Church of Great Britain
- Website: Wetherby Methodist

Wetherby Methodist Church is an active Methodist Church of Great Britain church in Wetherby, West Yorkshire, England. The present church is on Bank Street and replaces earlier chapels on North Street and Victoria Street. The church is Grade II listed, having been designated so on 30 April 1982.

== History ==
The present building opened on 30 October 1829 and was built at a cost of £720. The building replaces previous Methodist churches, one on North Street which has been demolished and is now a car park and another on Victoria Street which is now in use as commercial premises. The church received a grant from the National Churches Trust for £10,000 in 2010 The present church was refurbished in 2012.

== Architecture ==
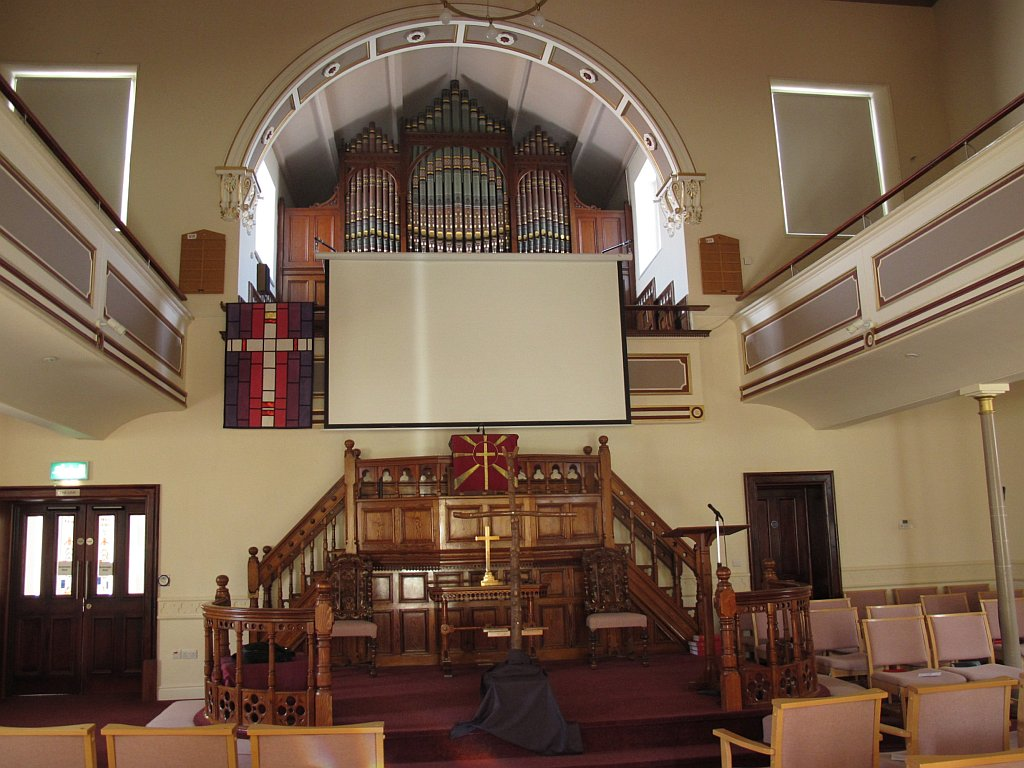
Interior

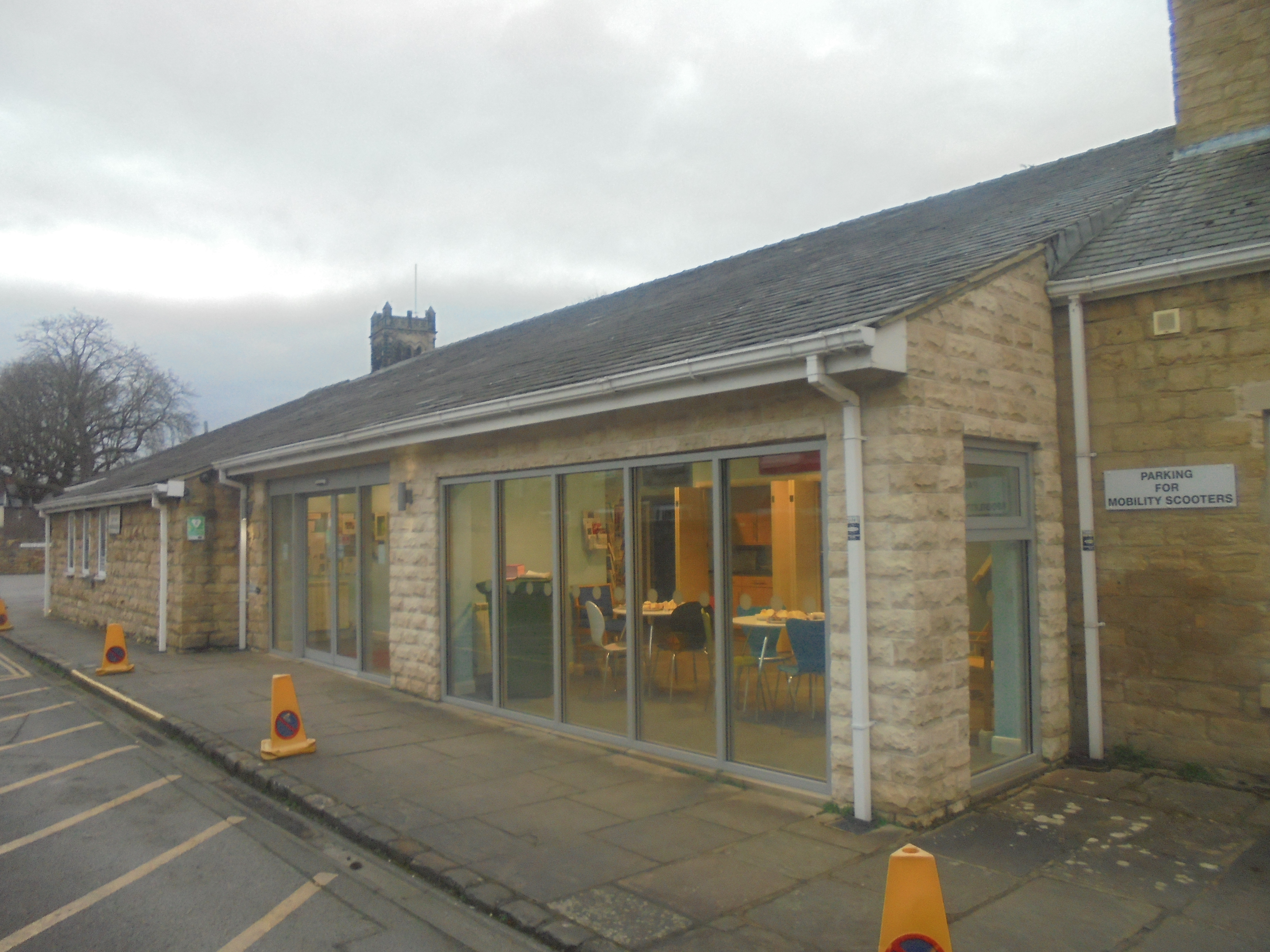
Single storey extension to the rear

The present building dates from 1829 and is of two storeys and built of Ashlar magnesian limestone with a Welsh slate roof. The interior has galleries on three sides as well as behind the pulpit. There are later single storey extensions to the rear, which contains a church centre. There is a small garden to the rear.

== See also ==
- Listed buildings in Wetherby
