= Wetherby Town Hall =

Municipal building in Wetherby, West Yorkshire, England

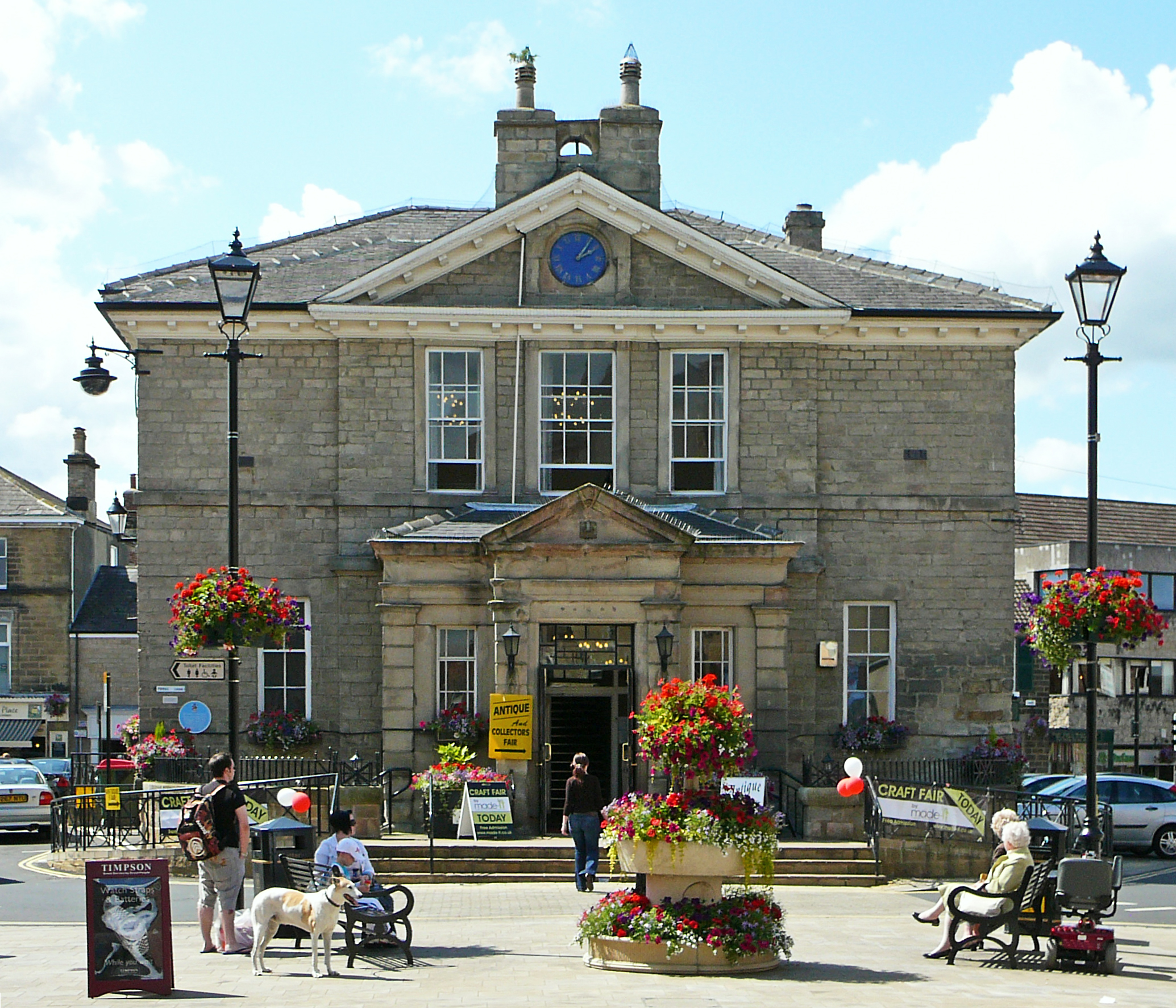
- Wetherby Town Hall
- Interactive map of the Wetherby Town Hall area

General information
- Architectural style: Classical
- Classification

Listed Building – Grade II
- Designated: 8 February 1988
- Reference no.: 1135070
- Location: Wetherby, England
- Coordinates: 53.928°N 1.386°W
- Construction started: 1845
- Cost: £1,300

Wetherby Town Hall is a community building in Wetherby, West Yorkshire, England. The town hall no longer plays a major civic function but provides an office which is used by Wetherby Town Council and facilities for local groups and events. It is a Grade II listed building.

== History ==
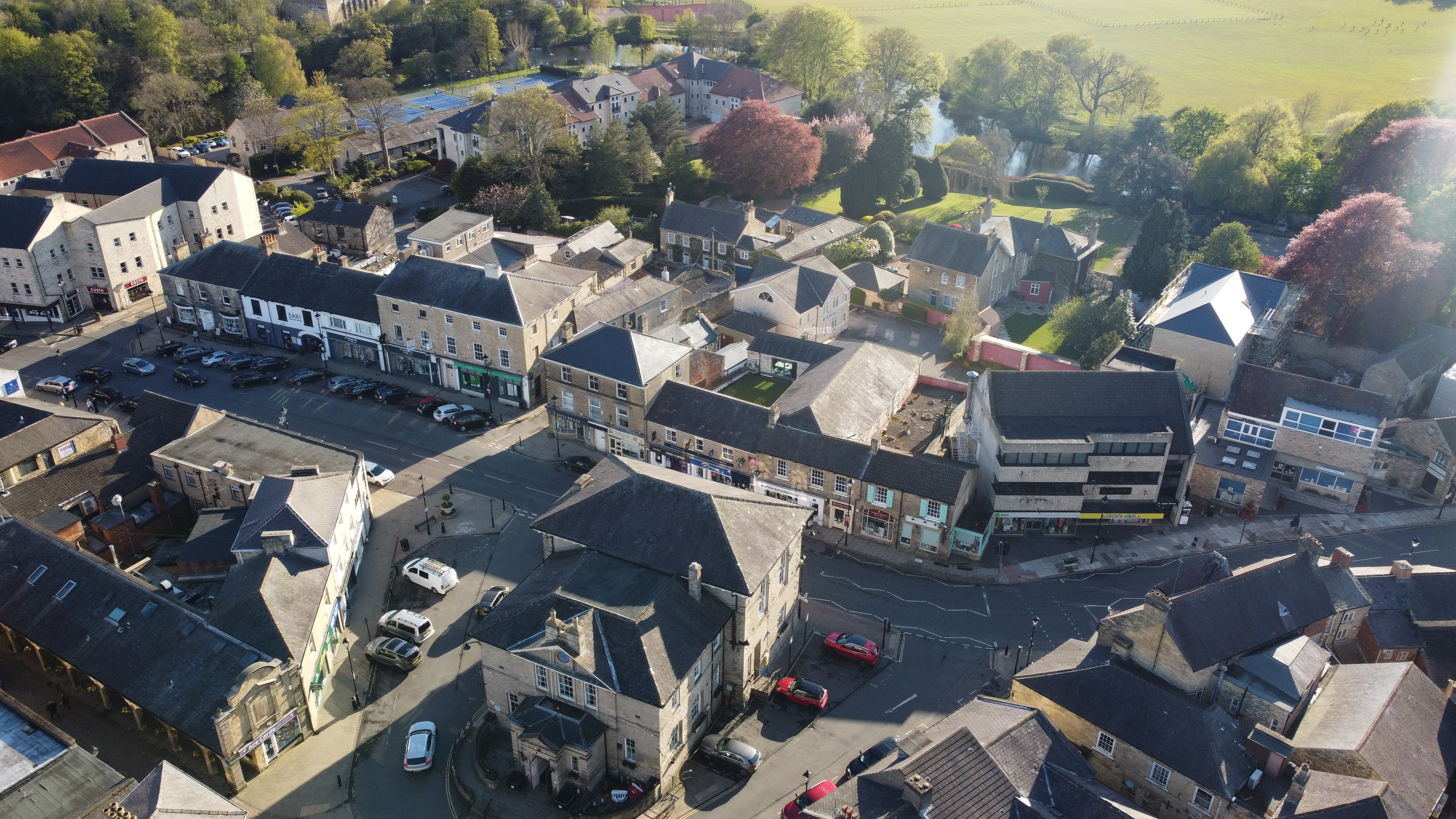
Aerial view of north and east elevations

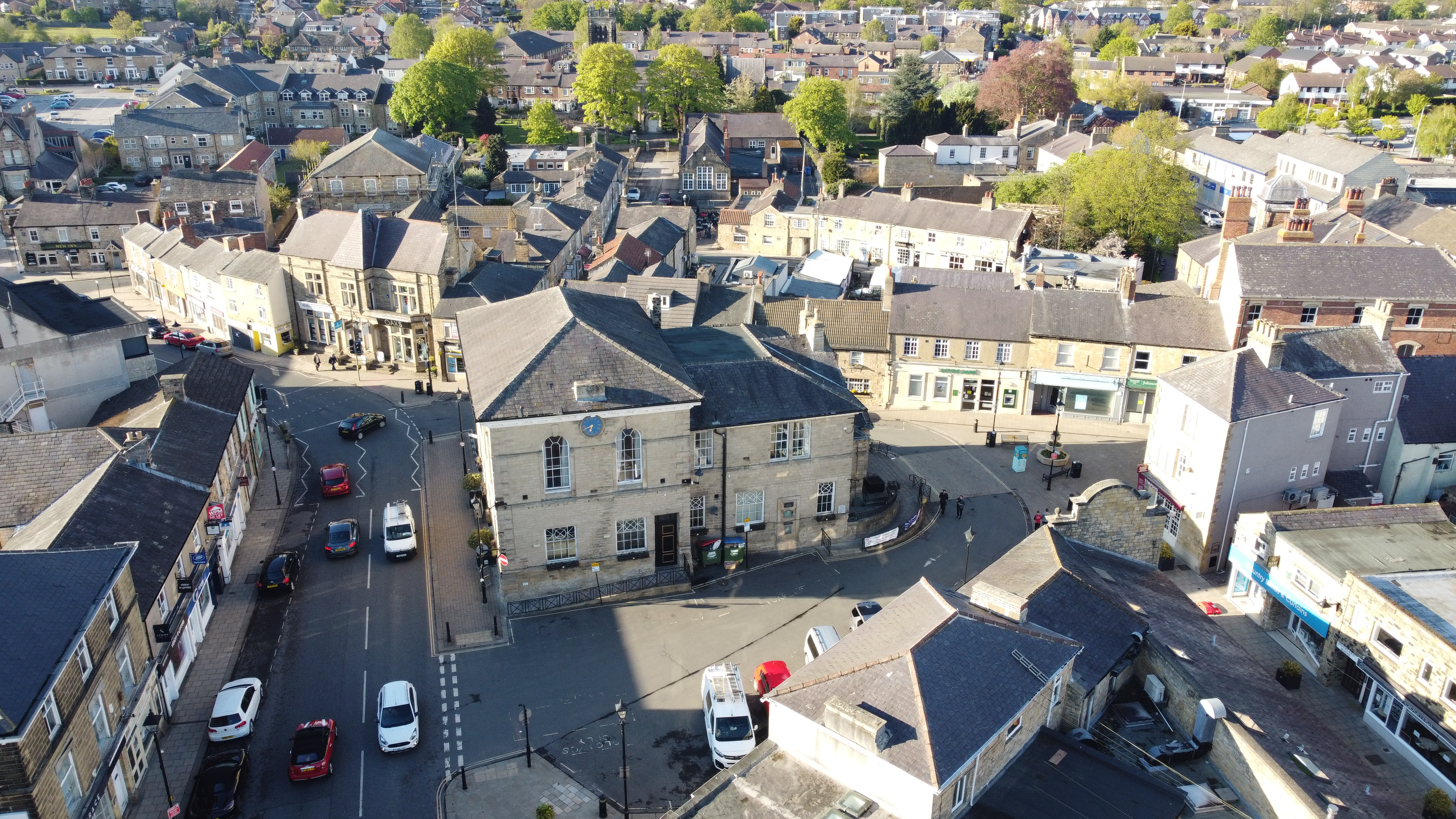
Aerial view of south facade

=== Old Town Hall ===
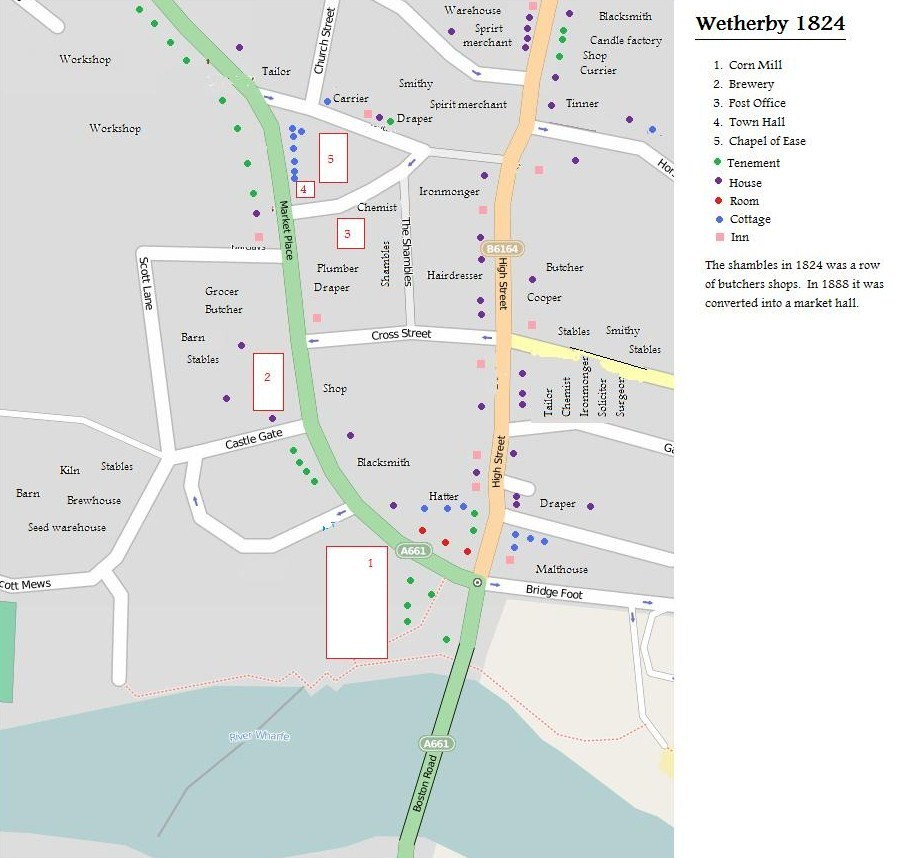
Wetherby town centre at the time of the Great Sale in 1824. The old town hall (4) and chapel of ease (5) are shown.

Wetherby's first town hall occupied the same site on the Market Place. It was a small plain building with little decoration, a clock on the front and bell tower. Its northern side had an external staircase to the first floor where civic and county court functions were carried out. The ground floor contained the town gaol and outside were the town stocks. It was demolished in 1845. Adjacent to the old town hall was the Market Place Chapel, a chapel of ease to the parish church in Spofforth, built in 1763. It was damaged in a fire in 1823 and became increasingly dilapidated.

=== New Town Hall ===
In 1845 William Raby, curate at Spofforth proposed that the old town hall site, together with that of the adjacent chapel should be the location for the new town hall and a national schoolroom. The schoolroom replaced the Sunday school held in the chapel. His proposal was supported by the Bishop of Ripon but was beset by problems. The church was assured the schoolroom would be used as a Sunday school in perpetuity but that use ended with the opening of a hall adjacent to St James' Church.

The town hall's foundation stone was laid in 1845 and the building was completed at a cost of £1,300 which was raised by public subscription. The new building was used for the county court, assembly rooms, a reading room, a small gaol, and had a ground-floor schoolroom. In 1846 the schoolroom was fitted out with a grant from the National Society.

During the First World War the town hall was requisitioned by the military for billets as were the racecourse and masonic hall. The seat of Wetherby Rural District Council moved to new offices on Westgate in the late 1930s.

The town hall was used as a court house until Wetherby Magistrates Court was built in the 1960s. The town hall's south side had a door to enable prisoners to be taken to the upper room but by 1962 it had gone. The main front chimney's originally had bells to summon the fire brigade.

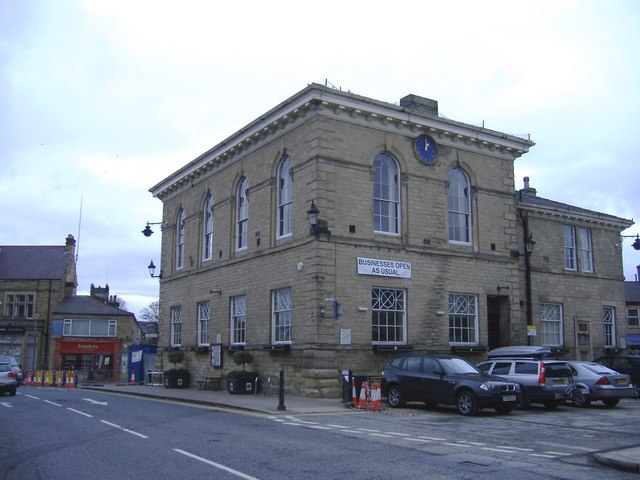
Town hall, view from the side and rear

Following the implementation of the Local Government Act 1972, the town hall ceased to be local seat of government and responsibility for managing it was transferred to Leeds City Council.

== Structure ==
Wetherby Town Hall and its front walls are grade II listed buildings. The Classical style two-storey town hall is built of sandstone and has a Welsh slate hipped roof. Ramps were added for access in 2005.

== Facilities and use ==
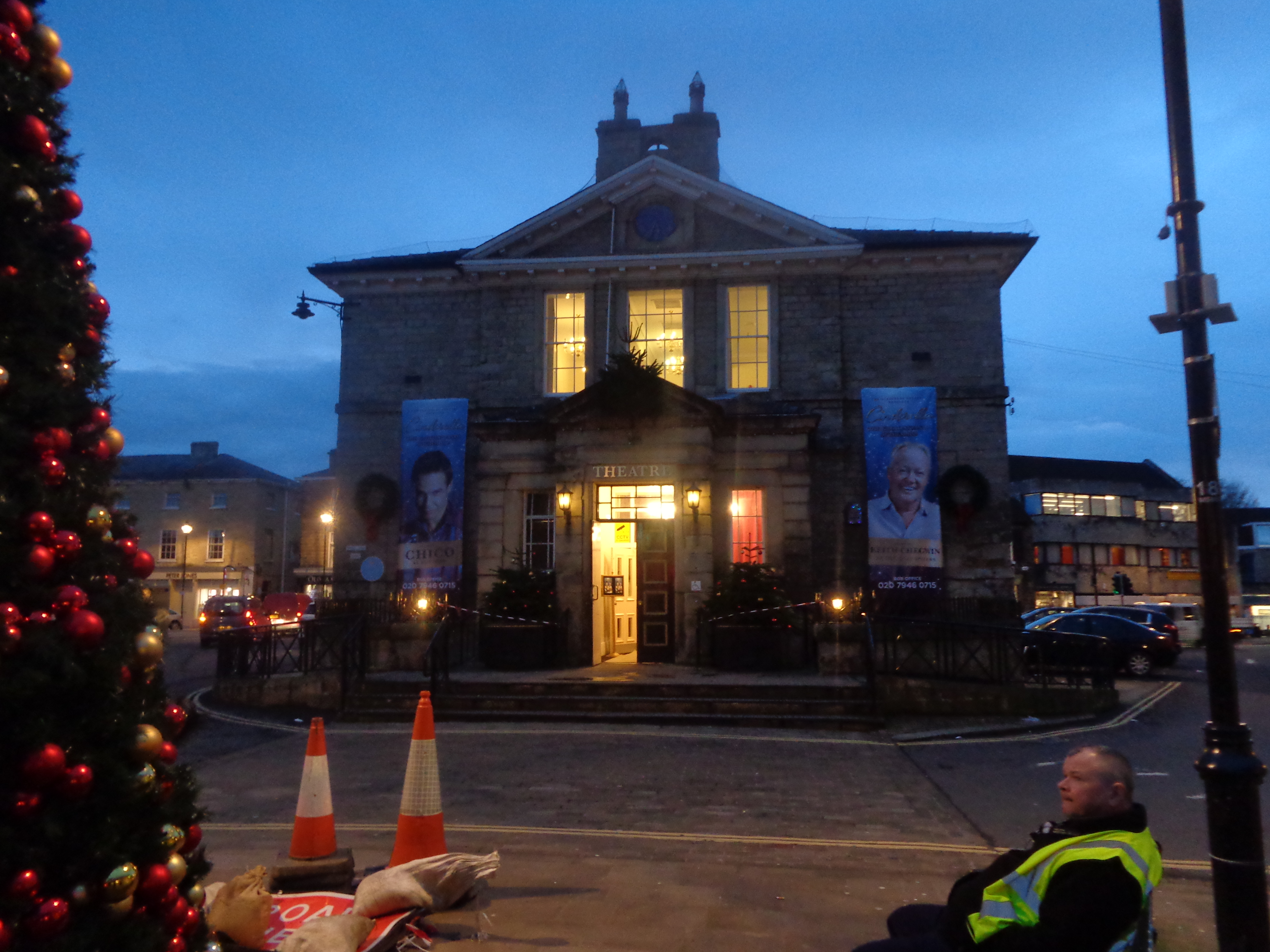
Wetherby Town Hall masquerading as the Albatross Theatre for the filming of Get Santa, February 2014.

The town hall has rooms available for public hire and an office used by the town council. Several groups use the facilities and occasional craft and antique fairs are held on Thursdays to coincide with market day. Trade events and public consultations are held in the town hall. The use of the town hall for trading activities has caused controversy with established traders who have protested about the 'cut price' sale of trading space which harms traders whose rates have helped to pay for its maintenance. In 2014 the town hall was used in place of a theatre for the filming of Get Santa as well as acting as the theatre for the filming of Tinsel town in 2025. In 2021 the town hall was used as a COVID-19 vaccination centre.

== See also ==
- Listed buildings in Wetherby

== Sources ==
- Unwin, Robert (1987). Wetherby the History of a Yorkshire Market Town. Leeds University Press for Wetherby Historical Trust. ISBN 0-9511968-0-4.
