= Wetherby Bridge =

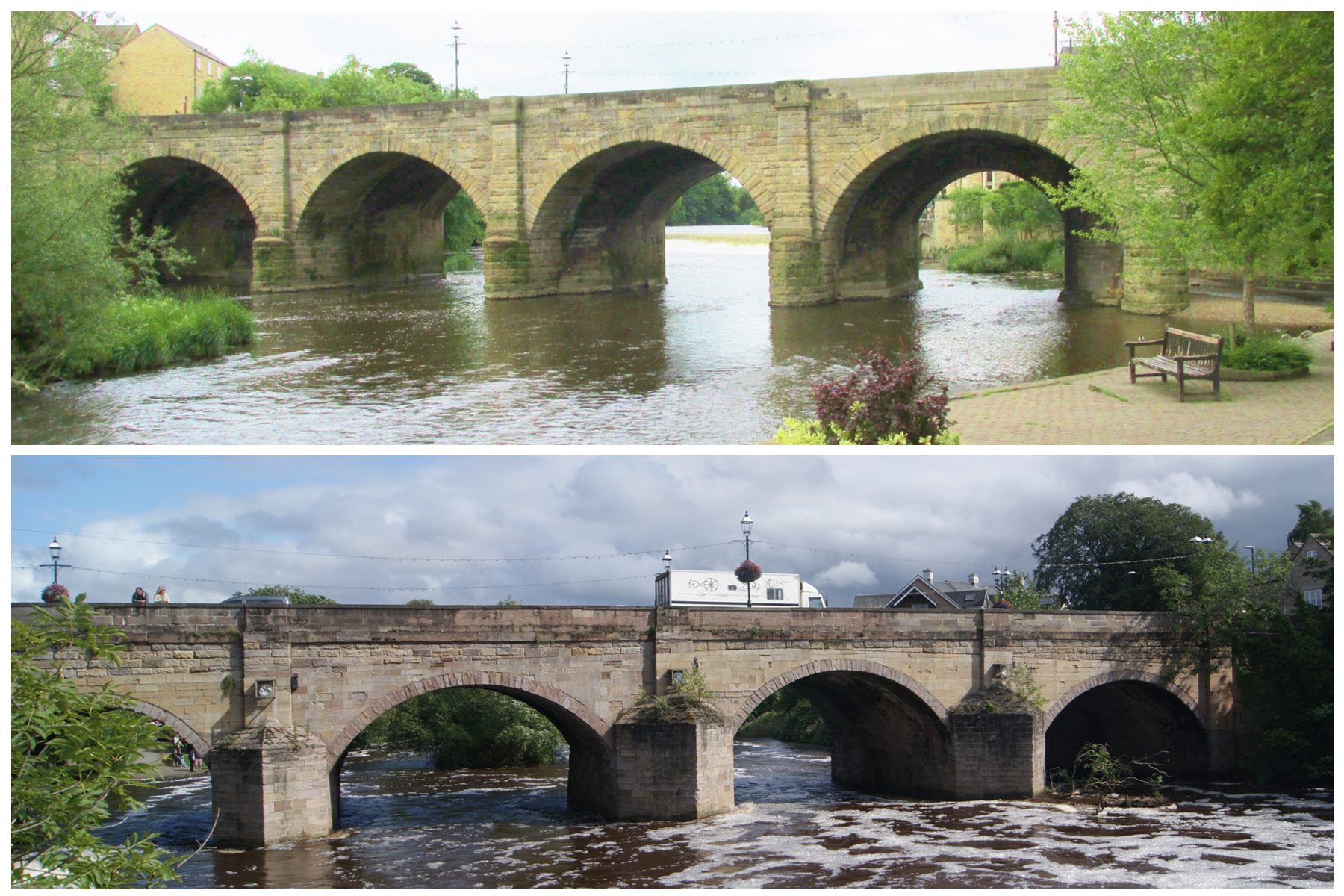
- Wetherby bridge, downstream side (upper image), upstream side (lower image)
- Coordinates: 53°55′36″N 1°23′10″W
- Carries: A661
- Crosses: River Wharfe
- Locale: Wetherby, West Yorkshire
- Other name: Wetherby Bridge

Characteristics
- Design: arch bridge
- Material: Stone
- No. of spans: 6
- Piers in water: 4

History
- Opened: 13th century

Location
- Interactive map of Wetherby Bridge

Wetherby Bridge is a scheduled monument and Grade II-listed bridge over the River Wharfe in Wetherby, West Yorkshire, dating from the 13th century. The bridge connects Micklethwaite on the south bank to the town centre on the north. It formerly carried the A1 Great North Road but now carries the A661 Boston Road leading to Boston Spa and the south.

== History ==
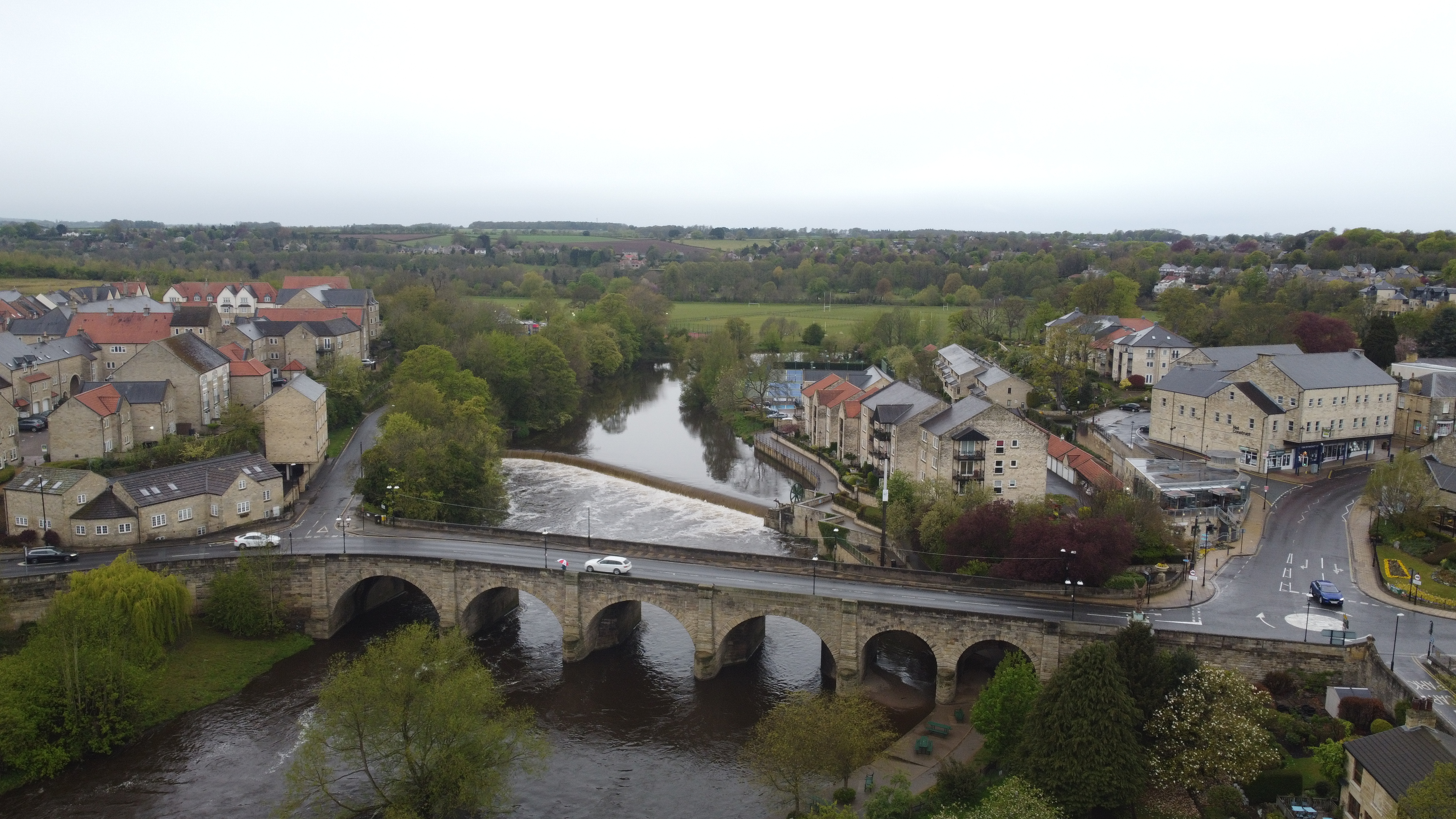
An aerial view of Wetherby Bridge

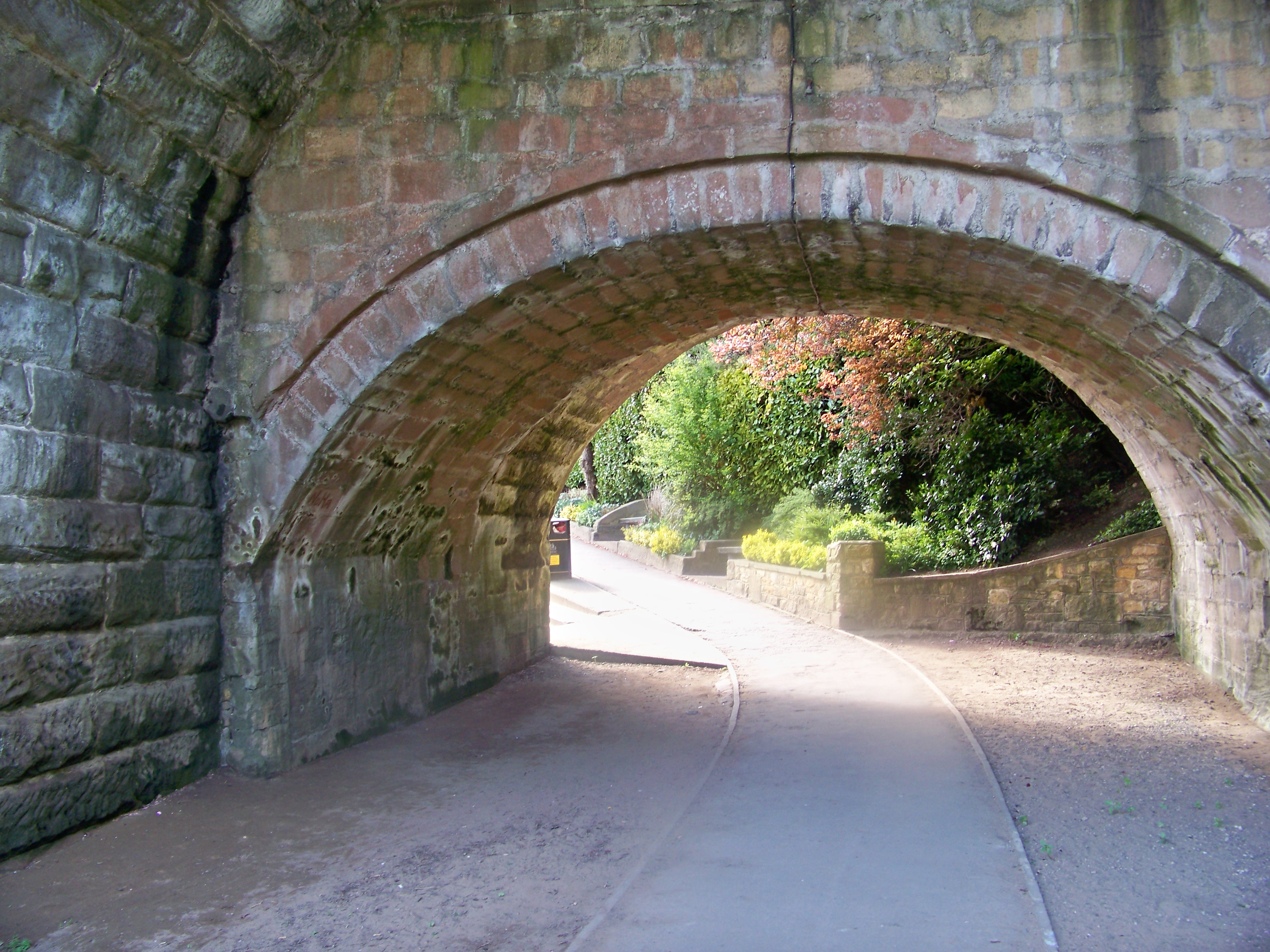
The three original bridges are evident from the change in height of the three arches seen here.

The bridge has 13th-century origins. It was rebuilt in the 17th century and widened twice, first in 1773 and in 1826 to a design by Bernard Hartley. Its repair has been a contentious political issue in the past.

In 1315 Eleanor de Percy petitioned Edward II for pontage for the bridge that she had undertaken to repair for redemption of the soul. An inquisition in York declared that 'nobody' was bound to repair the bridge and in 1316 Eleanor was granted pontage. In 1599 a stone mason complained at quarter session that he was owed £4 13s 4d for its repair. The court ordered that £5 should be levied to pay him. In 1614 at the Knaresborough quarter sessions it was reported that the bridge's pavement had decayed, the court issued a levy of twenty marks to be collected from the Wapentakes of Barkston, Claro and Skyrack to repair the bridge. In 1662 the bridge was described as being 'hazardous to passengers and cattle'; repairs were estimated to cost £260 which was paid from county rates and two Wetherby residents were appointed as surveyors. Issues regarding the bridge were raised at the quarter sessions ten times over the following fifty years and £300 was expended on its maintenance. The bridge was an important logistical link for the coalfields of Garforth and Kippax to the south of the town and settlements north of the Wharfe. Coal wagons caused the road surface to deteriorate while the fast rising nature of the Wharfe exacerbated structural problems.

== Turner ==
J. M. W. Turner visited Wetherby in 1816 and painted the bridge and town. The vantage point he used is no longer usable owing to tree growth.

== Other river crossings in Wetherby ==
Until the first Wetherby by-pass was built and its new bridge was opened by the Minister for Transport Ernest Marples in the late 1950s, Wetherby Bridge was the only crossing in the area. The next upstream bridge was at Linton and downstream at Boston Spa. The opening of the first by-pass bridge took the Great North Road away from the town. Wetherby Bridge is now one of three road crossings along with the first and second bypass bridges (opened in the late 1980s). Three bridges are usable by pedestrians; the Ings footbridge (built in the early 1970s), Wetherby Bridge and the first bypass bridge (the second one is inaccessible because of motorway regulations). Several bus routes cross the bridge.

== Flooding ==
Wetherby Bridge is around a hundred yards downstream from Wetherby Weir. When the Wharfe rises the adjacent car park and low-lying land at the Wilderness flood. The bridge's arches can act as a barrier collecting debris and driftwood that can cause problems after the river level subsides.

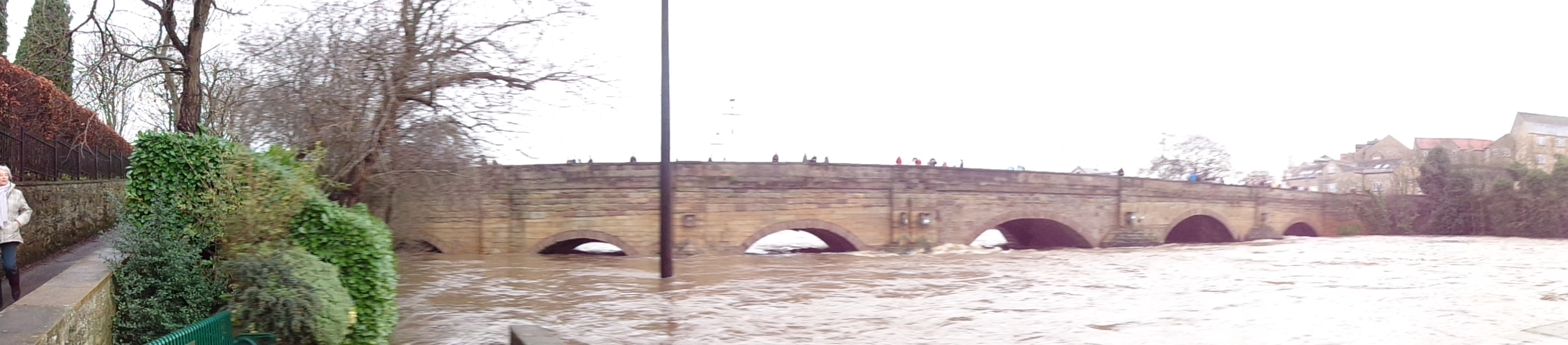
Wetherby Bridge during Storm Eva with the river level reaching almost the top of the arches.

== War memorial ==
The town's war memorial designed by E. F. Roslyn is on the bridge. On the morning of Remembrance Sunday the bridge is closed to traffic for the wreath laying ceremony.

== Gallery ==
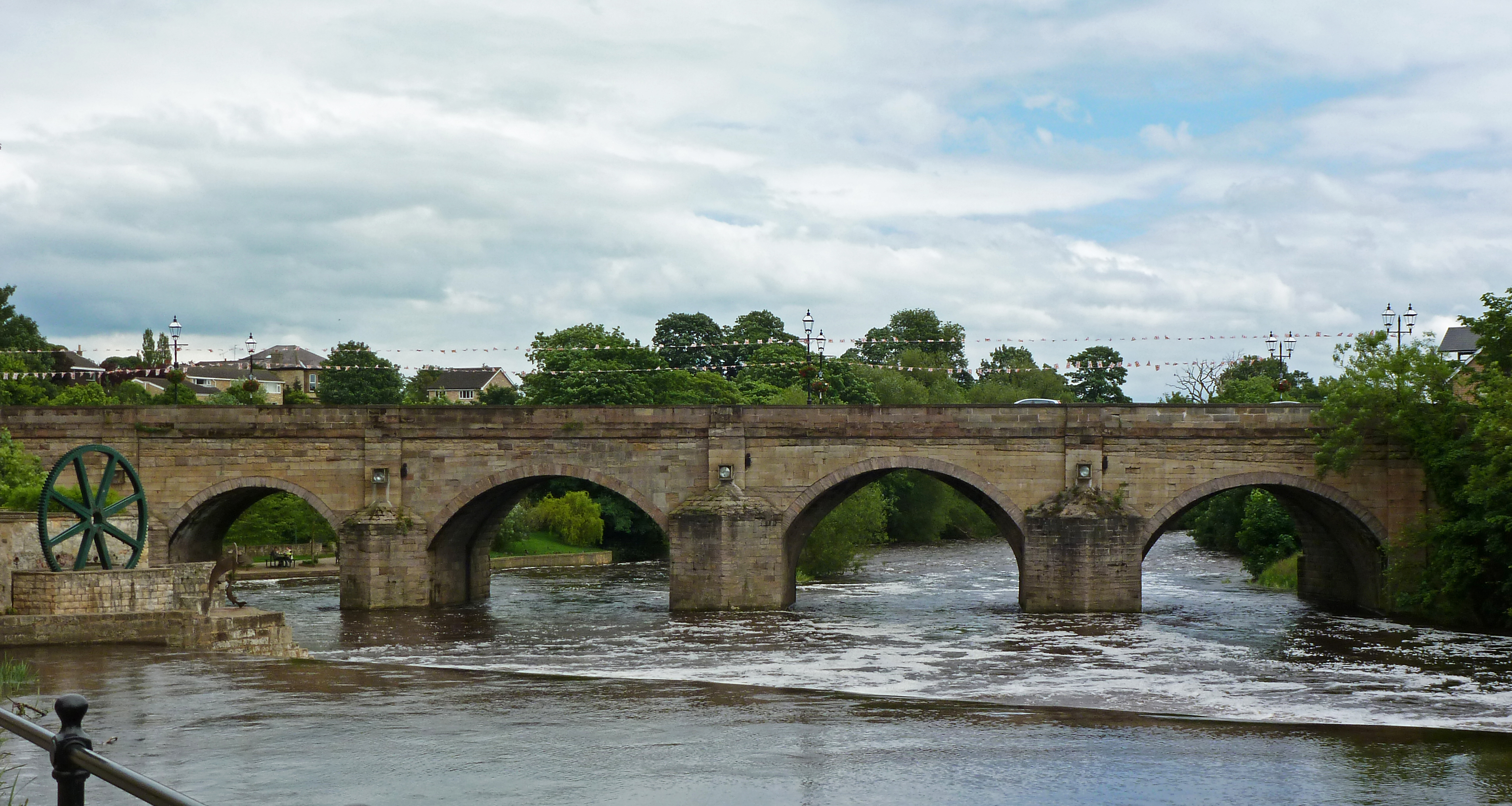
The west side of Wetherby Bridge showing the weir

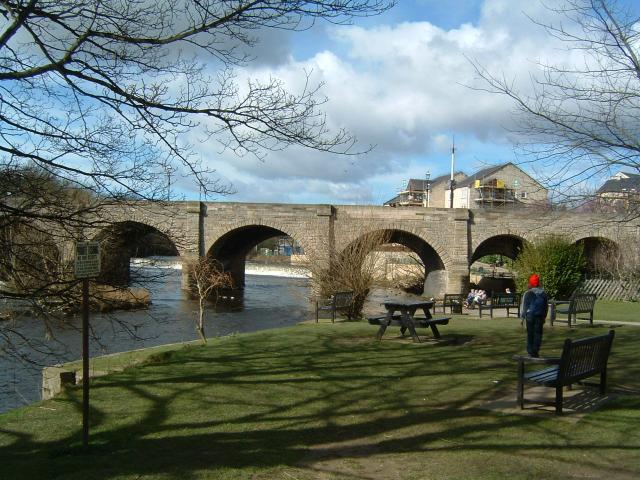
The east side of Wetherby Bridge

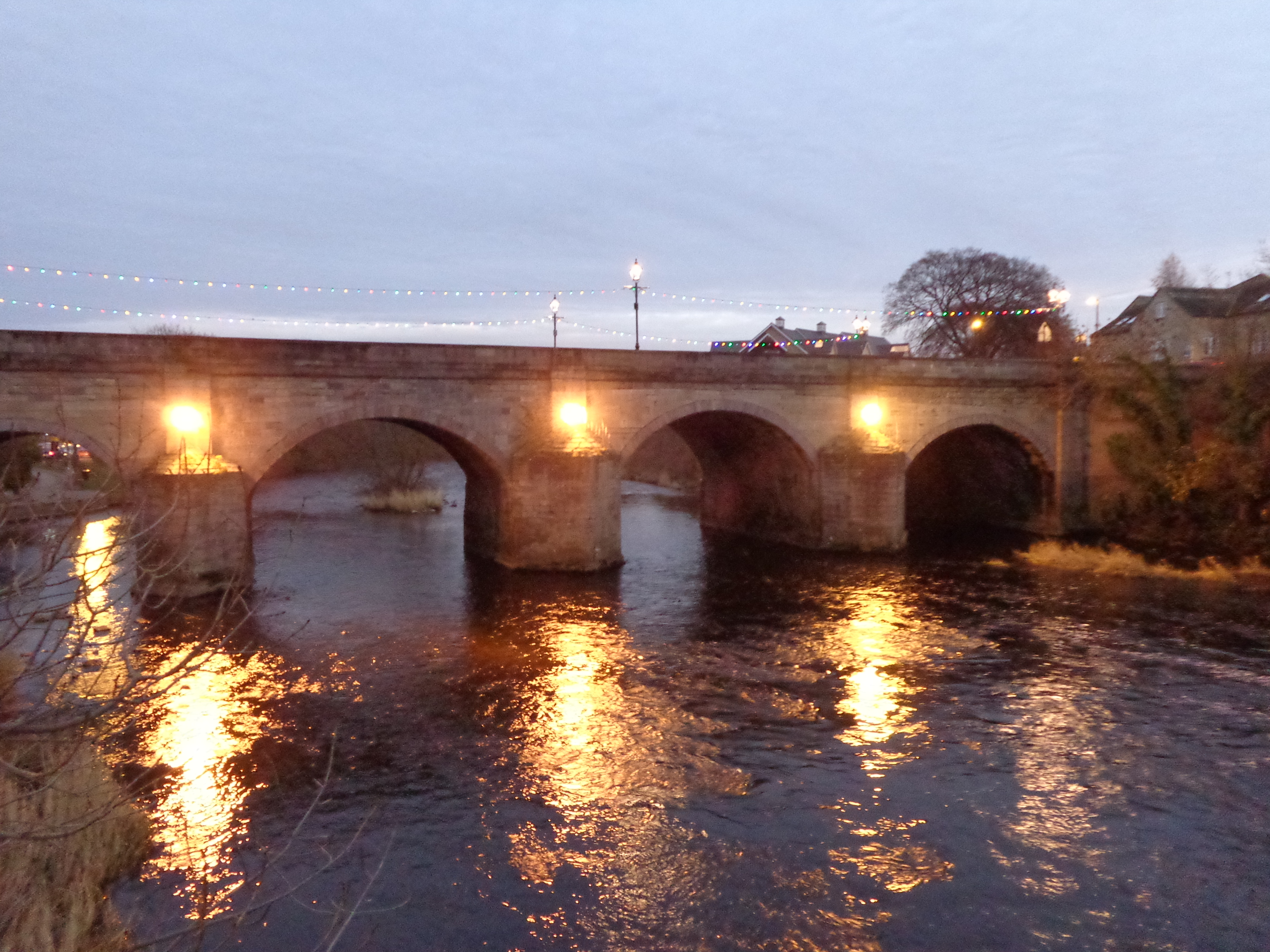
Wetherby Bridge illuminated

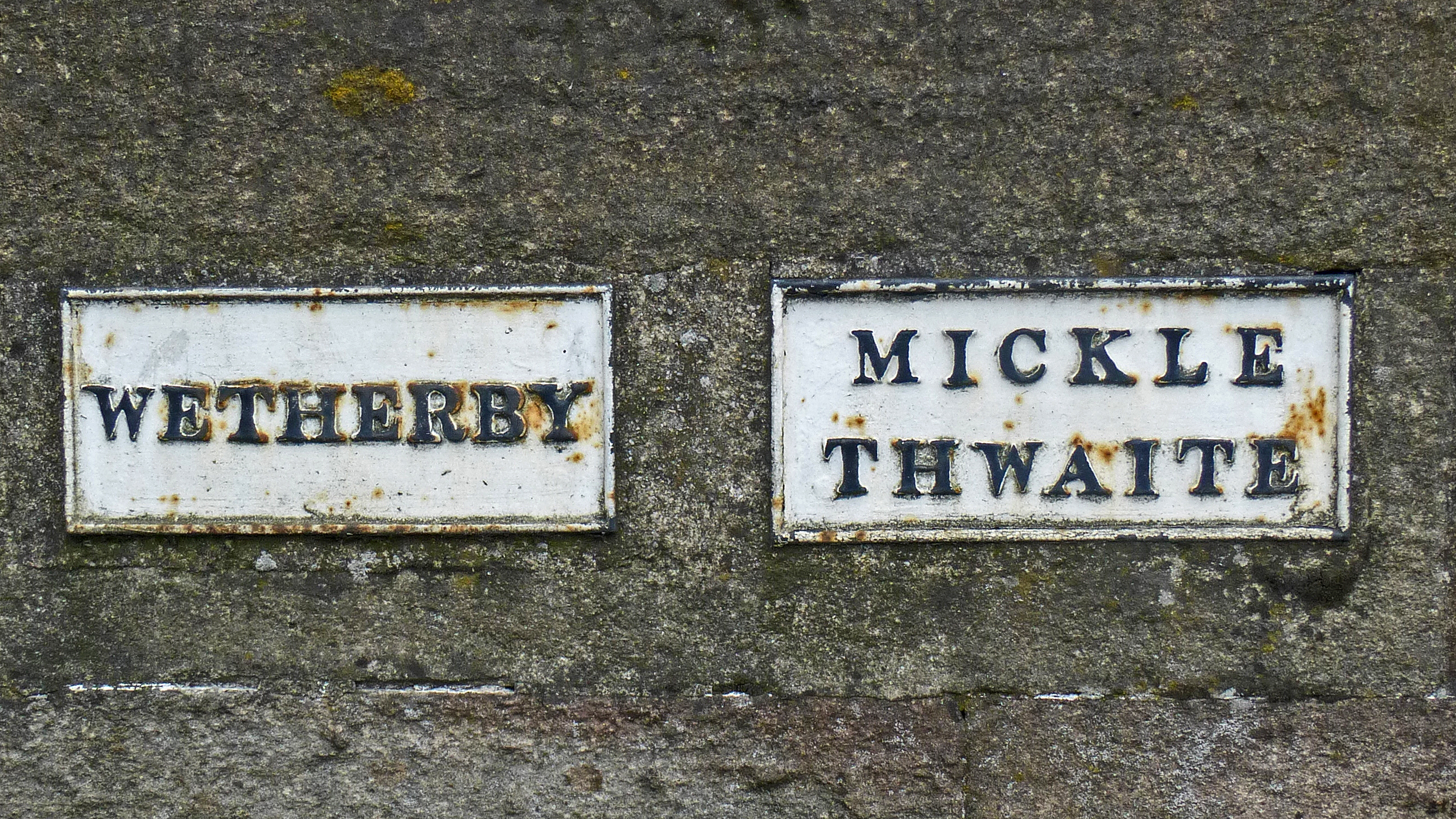
The boundary between Wetherby and Micklethwaite marked on the bridge

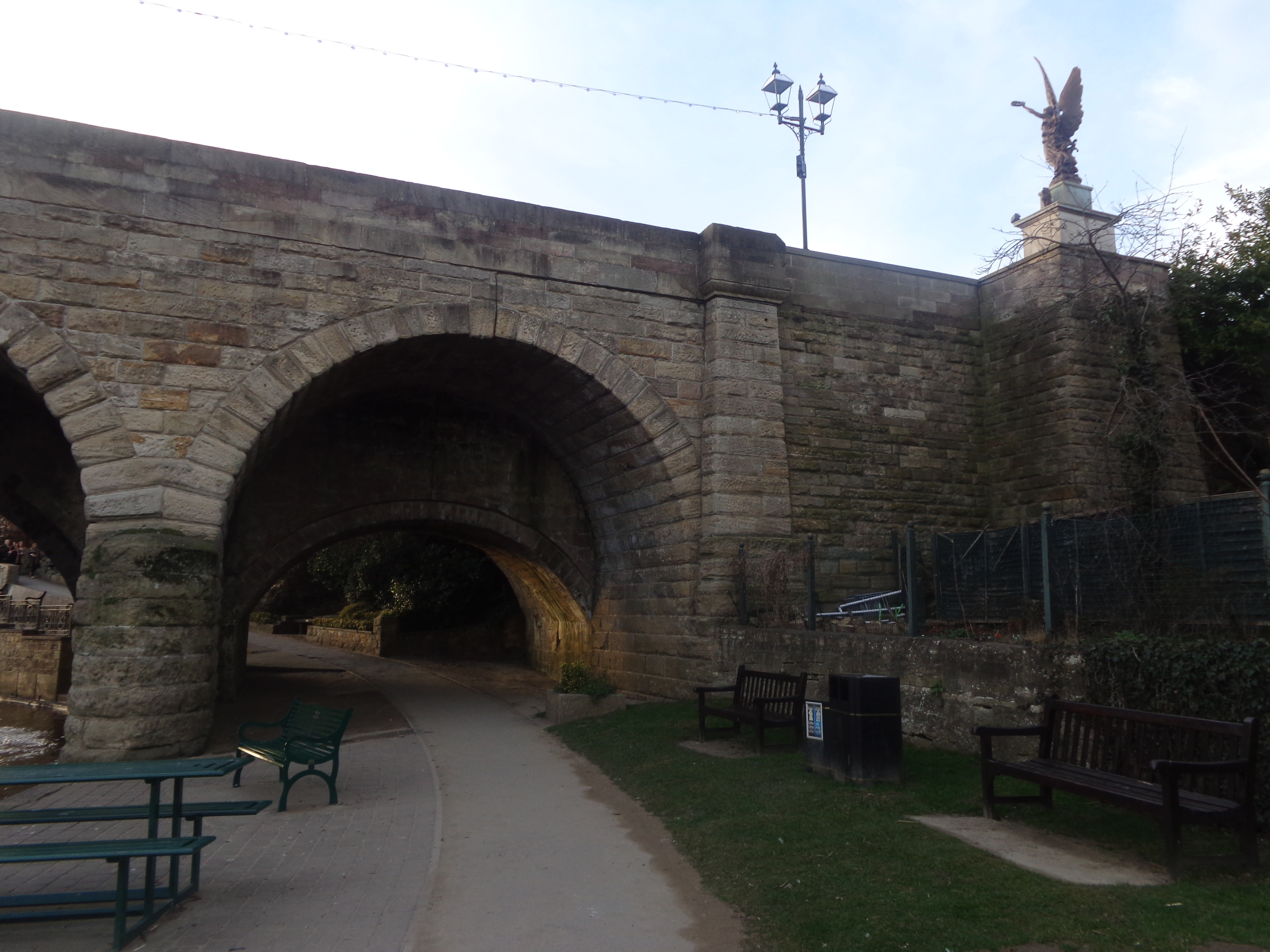
A pedestrian underpass under the bridges northernmost arch

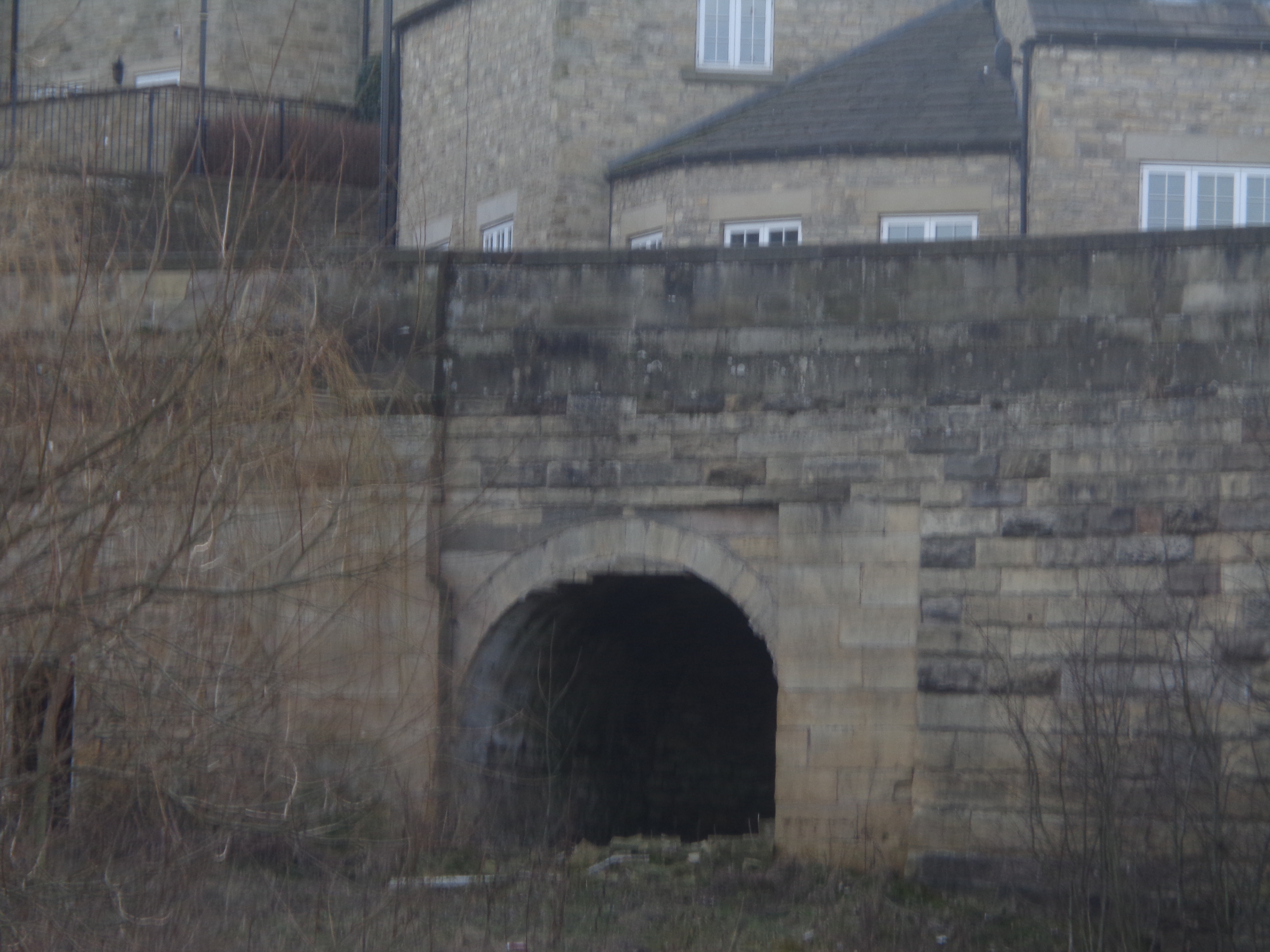
A shed under the bridge on the east side, south bank

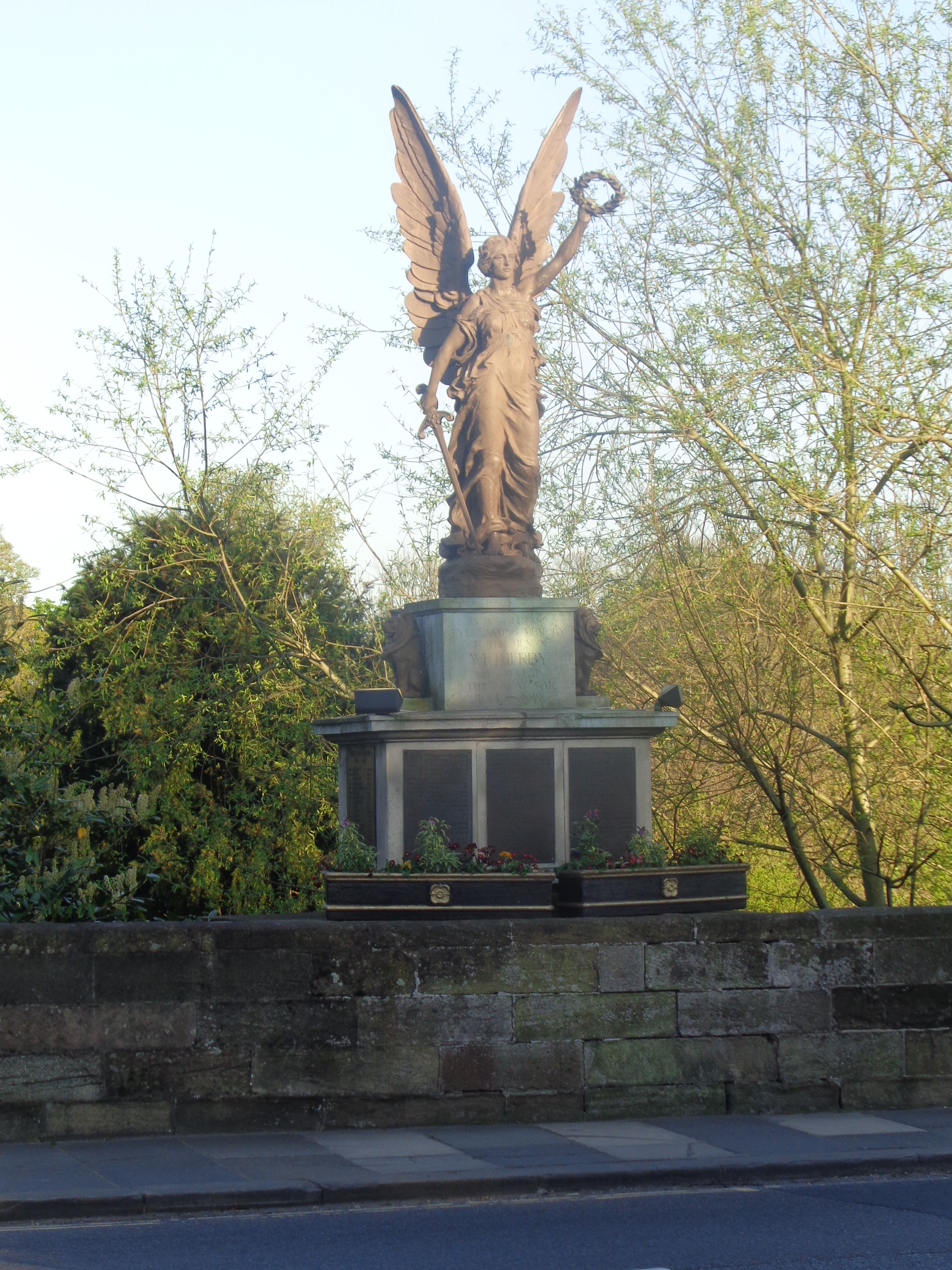
The town's war memorial on the bridge.

== See also ==
- History of Wetherby
- List of crossings of the River Wharfe
- Listed buildings in Wetherby
