= Ings =

Norse word for water meadows

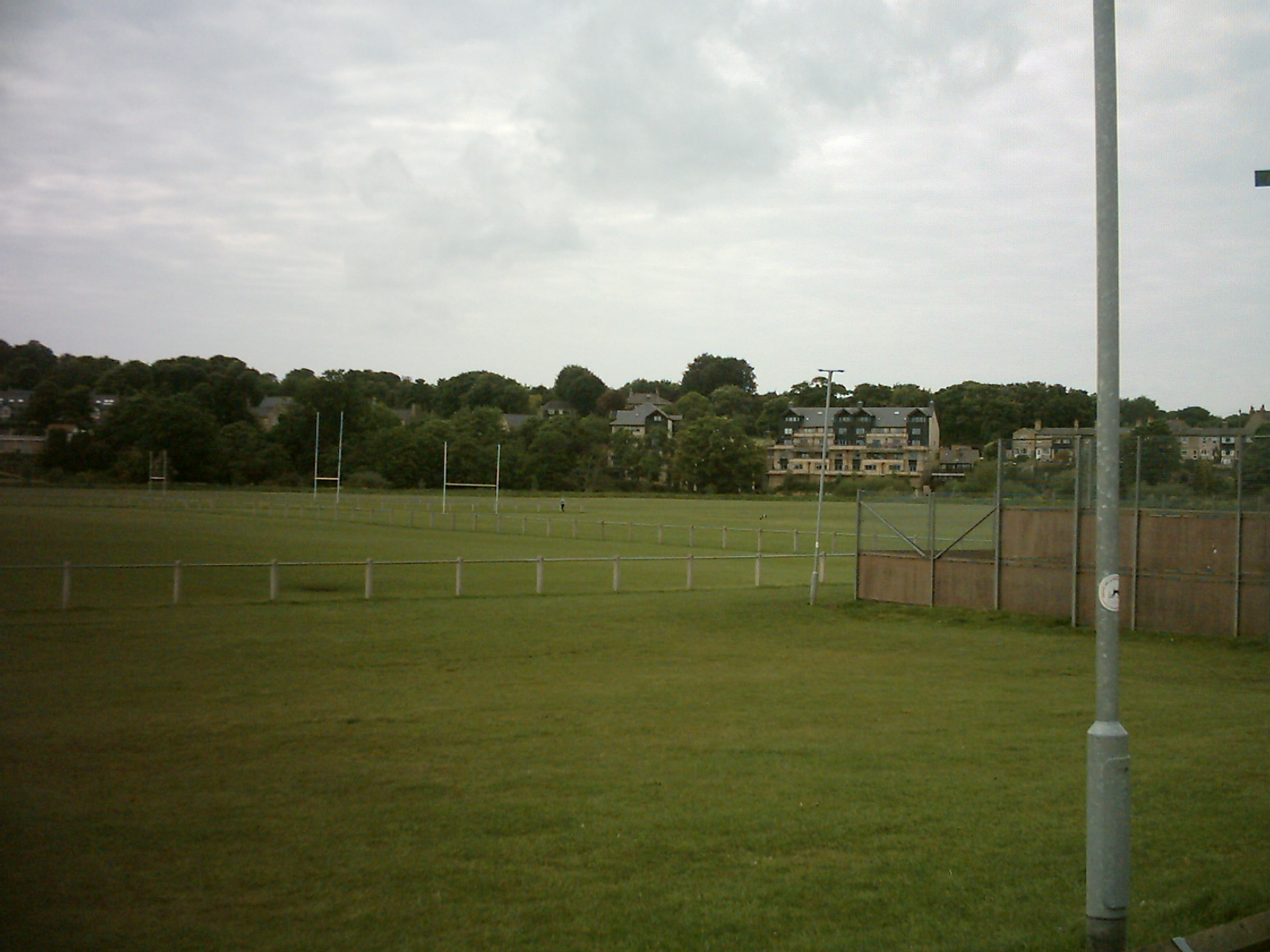
The Wetherby Ings on the River Wharfe at Wetherby, West Yorkshire

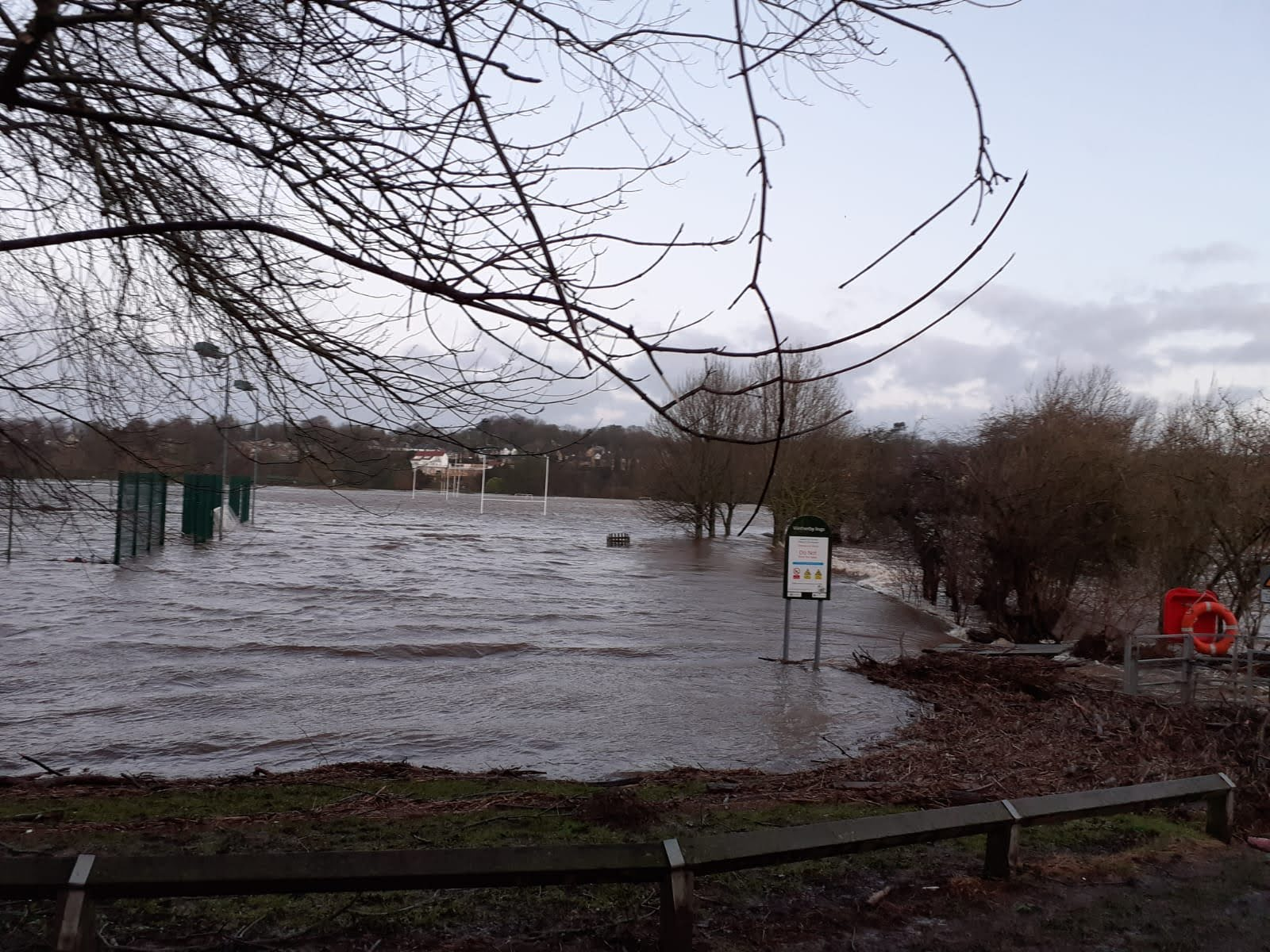
Wetherby Ings underwater as occurs in most years

Ings is an old word of Old English origin referring to water meadows and marshes.

The term appears in place names in Yorkshire (such as Hall Ings, Bradford, Fairburn Ings RSPB reserve, Clifton Ings in York, Derwent Ings, Sutton Ings, Acaster South Ings, and Wetherby Ings), as well as in Cumbria, and in Lincolnshire.

"Ings" may be of direct Old English origin or potentially borrowed into Old English from Old Norse.

== See also ==
- Carr (landform)
