= Fairburn, North Yorkshire =

Village and civil parish in North Yorkshire, England

Coordinates: 53.7458°N 1.2865°W

Fairburn
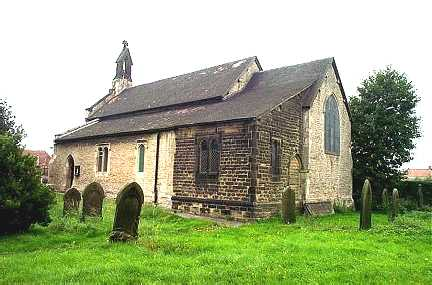
- St James' Church, Fairburn

- Location within North Yorkshire
- Population: 819 (2011 census)
- OS grid reference: SE471279
- Unitary authority: North Yorkshire
- Ceremonial county: North Yorkshire
- Region: Yorkshire and the Humber
- Country: England
- Sovereign state: United Kingdom
- Post town: CASTLEFORD
- Postcode district: WF11
- Dialling code: 01977
- Police: North Yorkshire
- Fire: North Yorkshire
- Ambulance: Yorkshire
- UK Parliament: Selby

Fairburn is a small village and civil parish in North Yorkshire, England.

Situated approximately 10 miles (16 km) east of Leeds, the village lies close to the A1(M) motorway and the M62 motorway and until 2005, when the A1(M) motorway was opened, Fairburn was divided in two by the old A1 and the two sides of the village were connected by just one vehicle bridge and one pedestrian footbridge, both of which have subsequently been removed.

== Overview ==
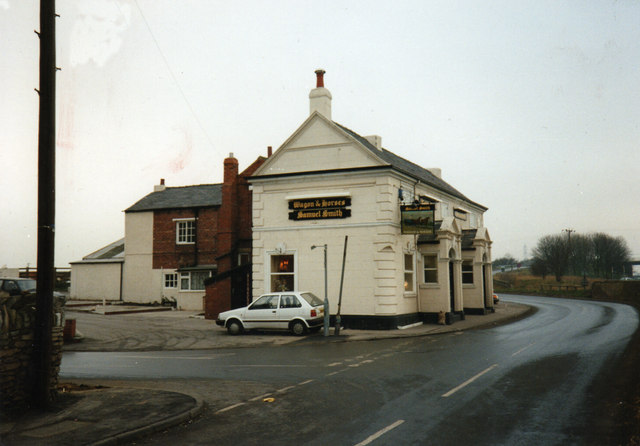
The Wagon & Horses

The village sits on the eastern edge of a narrow ridge of southern magnesian limestone which runs from near Worksop in the south to near Richmond in the north. The geology gives rise to a particularly flower-rich limestone grassland which still exists in areas unsuitable for cultivation, whilst alluvial soils and clays are found in the river valley bottoms. This outcrop of limestone was used to construct many of the older houses in the village.

=== Fairburn Ings Nature Reserve ===
Adjacent to the village is Fairburn Ings Nature Reserve, 1,000 acres (400 ha), with a Visitor Centre.

== History ==
The name of Fairburn was first attested around 1030, as Faren-burne. This name comes from the Old English words fearn ('fern') and burna ('spring, stream'), and thus meant 'spring characterised by ferns'.

Fairburn was historically a township in the ancient parish of Ledsham in the wapentake of Barkston Ash in the West Riding of Yorkshire. The township became a separate civil parish in 1866. From 1974 to 2023 it was part of the Selby District, it is now administered by the unitary North Yorkshire Council.

== Notable residents ==
William Jessop, one of the most prolific engineers of the canal age, was living in Fairburn with his wife Sarah in 1781, as their second son Josias was baptised there on 26 October. They left to move to Newark two or three years later, and Josias went on to become a civil engineer in his own right.

== Bibliography ==
- Skempton, Sir Alec; et al. (2002). A Biographical Dictionary of Civil Engineers in Great Britain and Ireland: Vol 1: 1500 to 1830. Thomas Telford. ISBN 0-7277-2939-X.
