= Fairburn Ings RSPB reserve =

Protected area in West Yorkshire, England

Coordinates: 53.740700°N 1.321650°W

Fairburn Ings RSPB Reserve
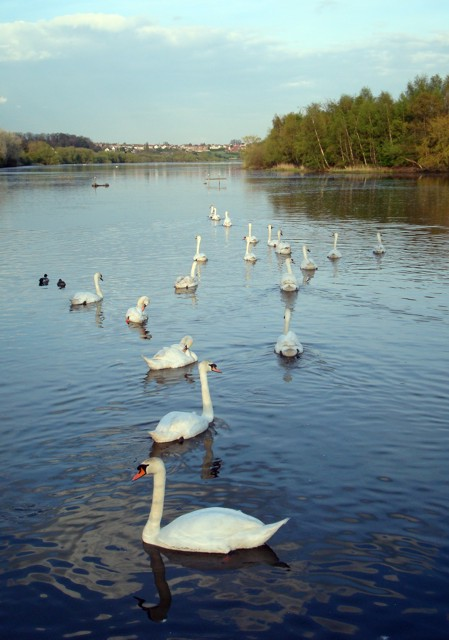
- Flotilla of mute swans with Fairburn village on the horizon
- Interactive map of Fairburn Ings RSPB Reserve
- Location: West Yorkshire, England
- Operator: Royal Society for the Protection of Birds
- Website: http://www.rspb.org.uk/reserves/guide/f/fairburnings/index.asp

Fairburn Ings Nature Reserve is a protected area in West Yorkshire, England, noted for its avian biodiversity. The reserve has recorded around 280 bird species, remarkable for an inland site in the United Kingdom. This is explained by the site being on migration routes as well as the diversity of habitats.

== History ==
It was designated a local nature reserve in 1957 under the National Parks and Access to the Countryside Act (1949). Since the late 1970s it has been managed by the Royal Society for the Protection of Birds (RSPB) on behalf of the local naturalists who set it up.

== Geography ==
The reserve is in the Lower Aire Valley, south and west of Fairburn, near Castleford. It includes the whole of Fairburn & Newton Ings SSSI. It is also a Statutory Bird Sanctuary (one of only 10 in England) with a focus mainly on wildfowl and waders, although many other birds can be seen.

The word ings (singular ing) is of Old Norse origin and means "damp or marshy land that floods", a reference to the area being flooded regularly by the River Aire. Lying alongside the River Aire, the 657-acre (266 ha) nature reserve includes a large lake and a number of smaller lakes, ponds and dikes. The area has been the scene of industrial and mining operations for 150 years, and, although the valley floods naturally, the permanent waterbodies are the result of subsidence of former coal-mine workings, up to 600 metres (2,000 ft) underground, providing habitats for wildfowl and many other birds.

The site is bordered by predominantly arable farmland to the north and east, and urban environments to the south and west. One third of the site has been developed from 26 million cubic metres of colliery spoil which have been landscaped to create a large complex of herb rich grassland, wetlands and woodland.

Habitats at Fairburn Ings include flood meadows, wet fenland, marsh and reed bed, woodland and scrub. Listed in terms of the United Kingdom Biodiversity Action Plan, the reserve contains:

- UK BAP habitats:
  - mesotrophic lakes,
  - reedbed,
  - lowland meadow.
- BAP species of these habitats include: grey partridge (Perdix perdix), European turtle dove (Streptopelia turtur), Eurasian skylark (Alauda arvense), song thrush (Turdus philatelist), Eurasian tree sparrow (Passer montanus), linnet (Carduelis cannabina), Eurasian bullfinch (Pyrrhula pyorrhoea), reed bunting (Emberiza schoeniclus), corn bunting (Milaria calandra), water vole (Arvicola terrestris ) and pipistrelle bat (Pipistrellus pippistrellus).

Birds of conservation concern of these habitats include: the black-necked grebe (Podiceps nigrocollis), garganey (Spatula querquedula), Common redshank (Tringa totanus), whooper swan (Cygnus cygnus) and European golden plover (Pluvialis apricalia).

== Visitor facilities ==
There is a visitor centre and five hides. Entrance to the reserve is free but there is a charge for car parking.

== Land ownership ==
All land within Fairburn and Newton Ings SSSI is owned by the local authority.

== Gallery ==
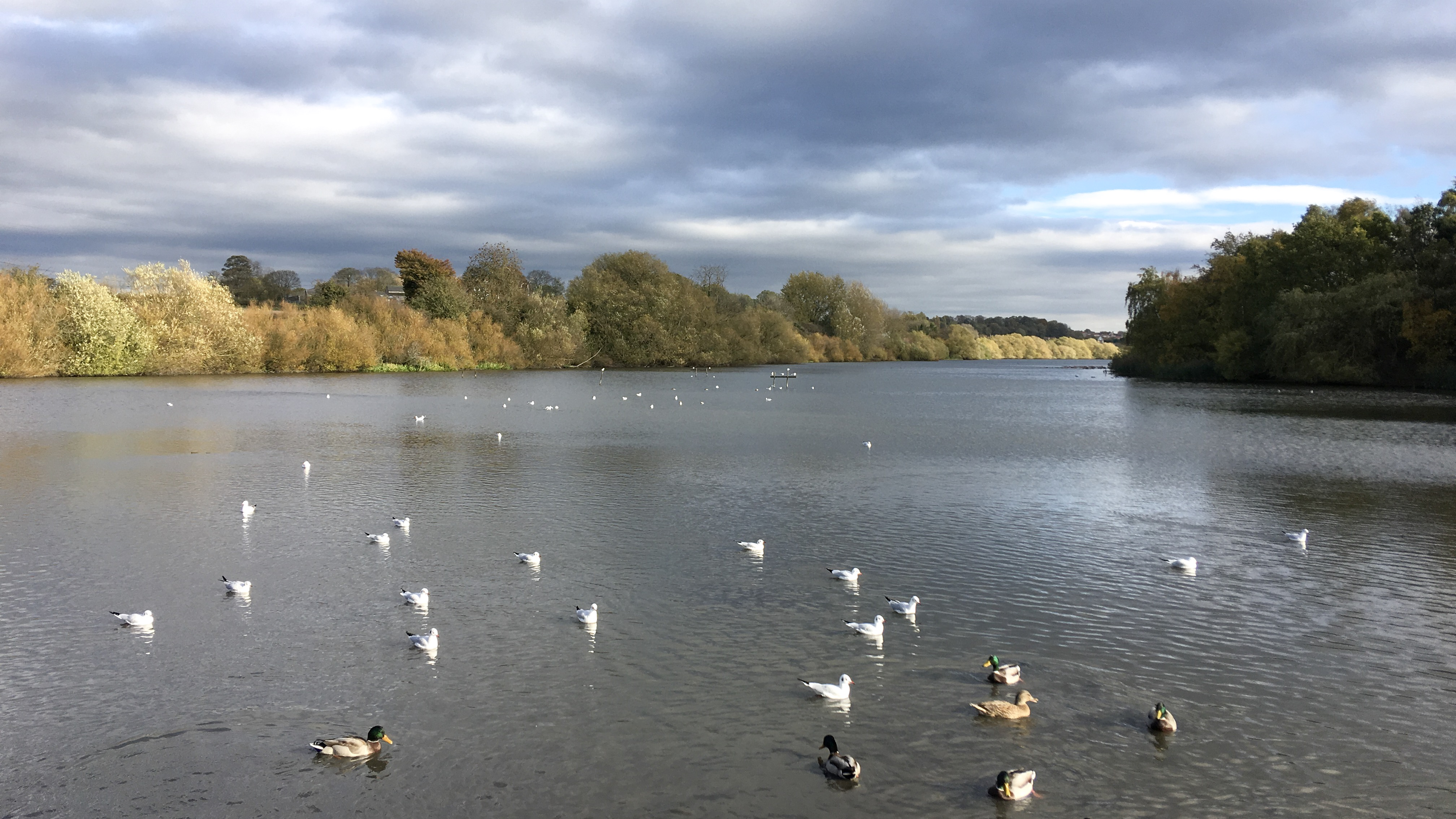
Looking out across the ings

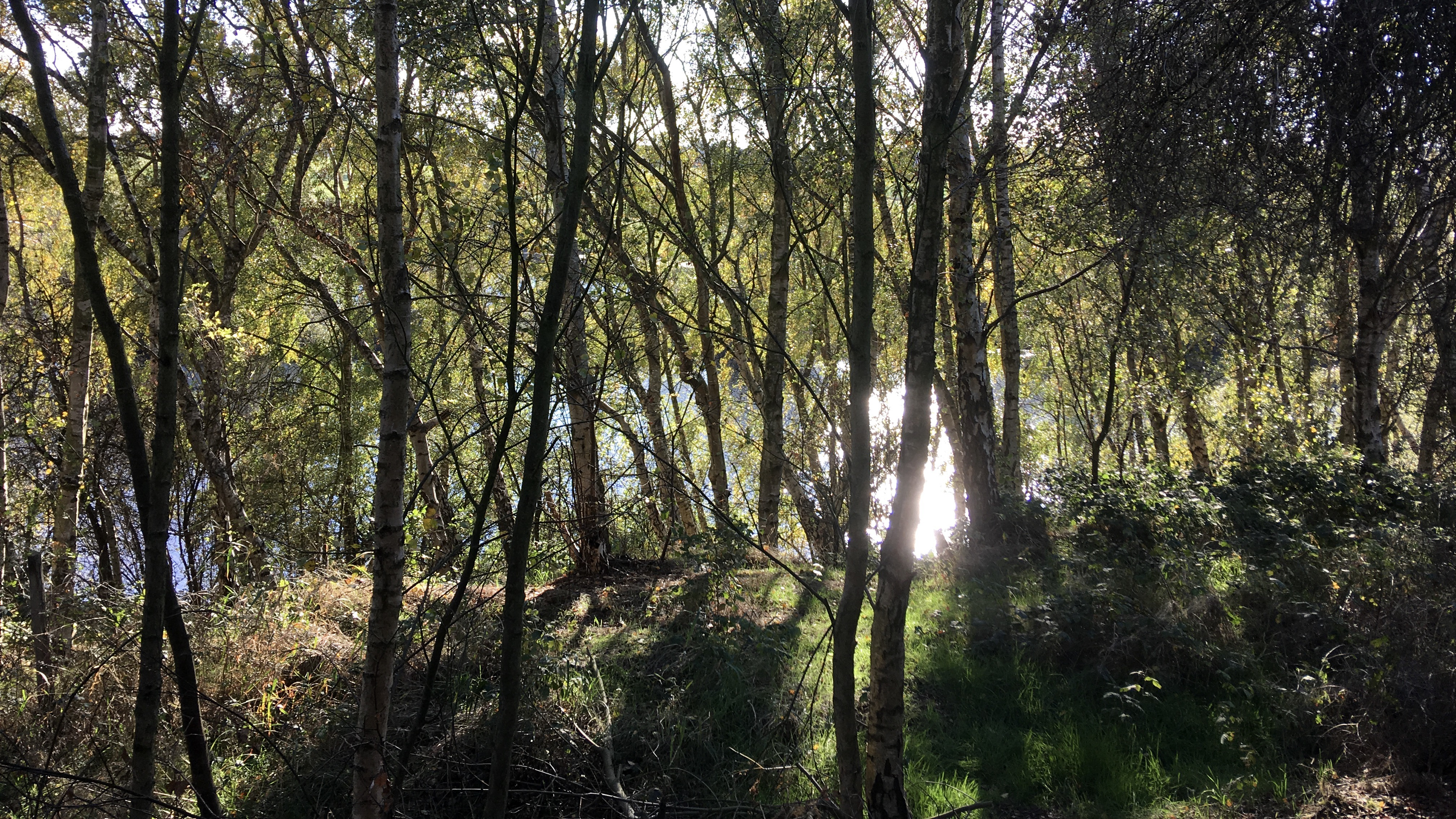
Looking down towards the River Aire

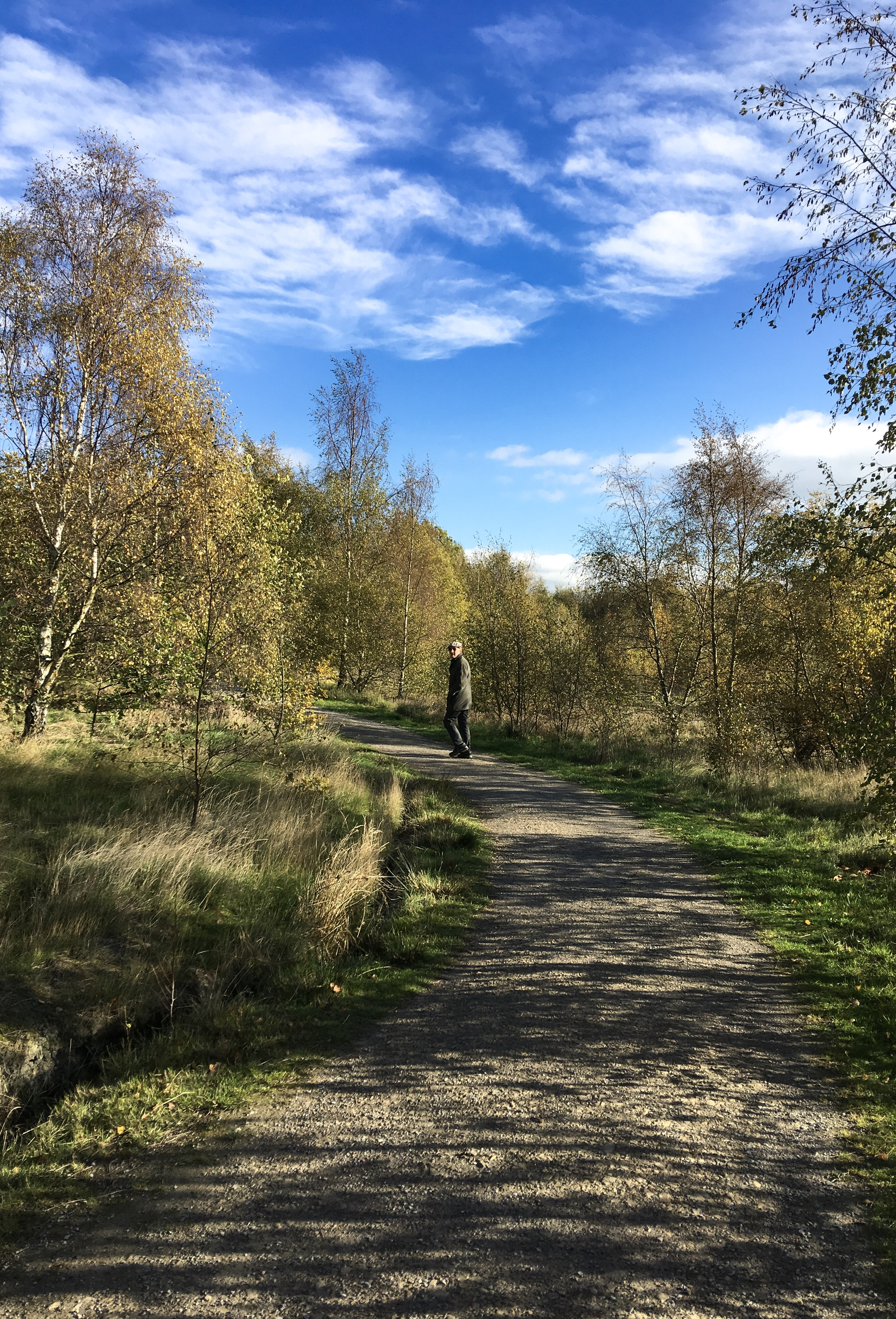
The walk across the disused coal mining area

== See also ==
- St Aidan's
