= Wetherby Ings =

Water meadows in West Yorkshire, England

Coordinates: 53.926°N 1.391°W

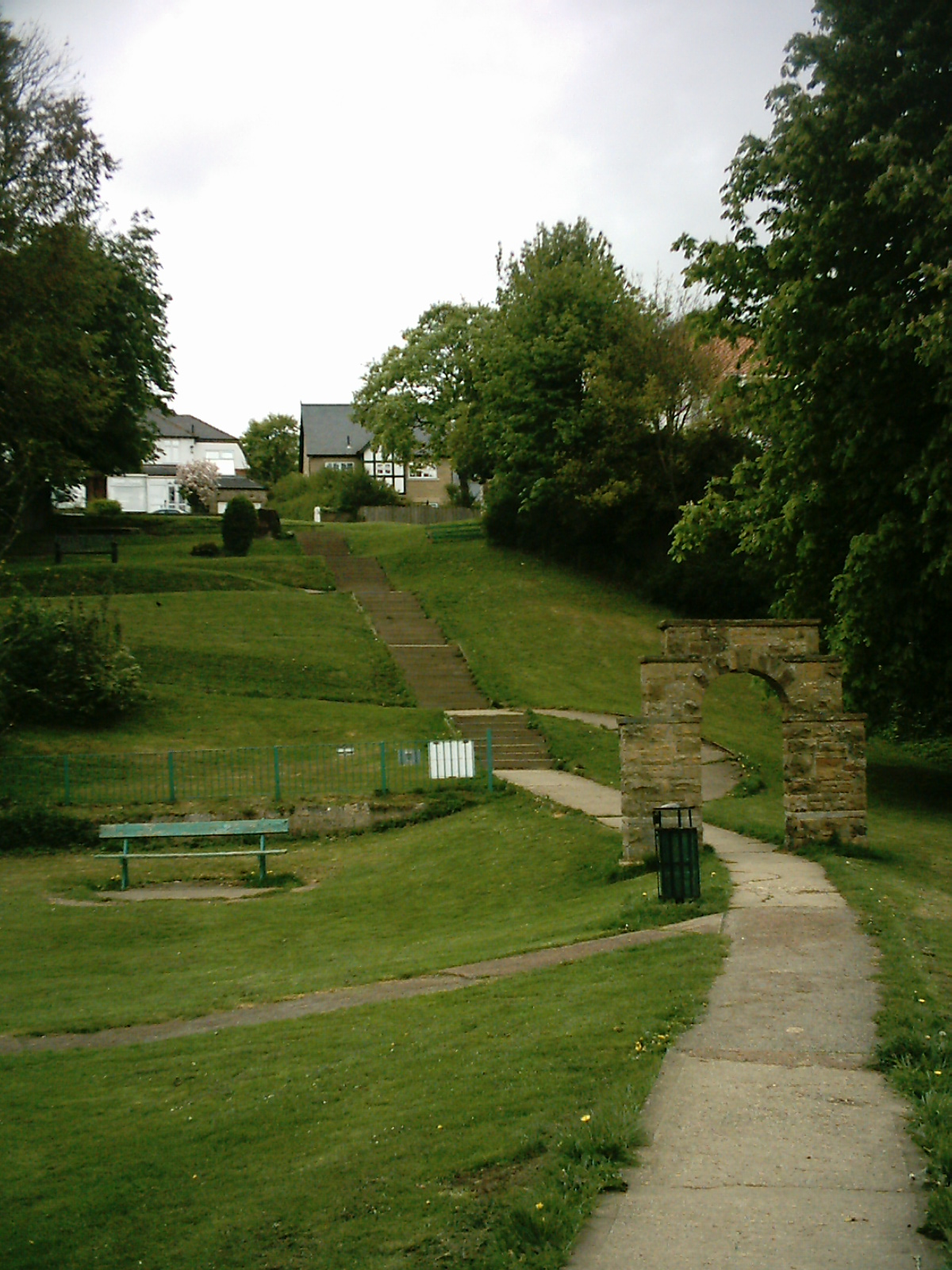
Access to King George's field (North Bank) from Linton Road

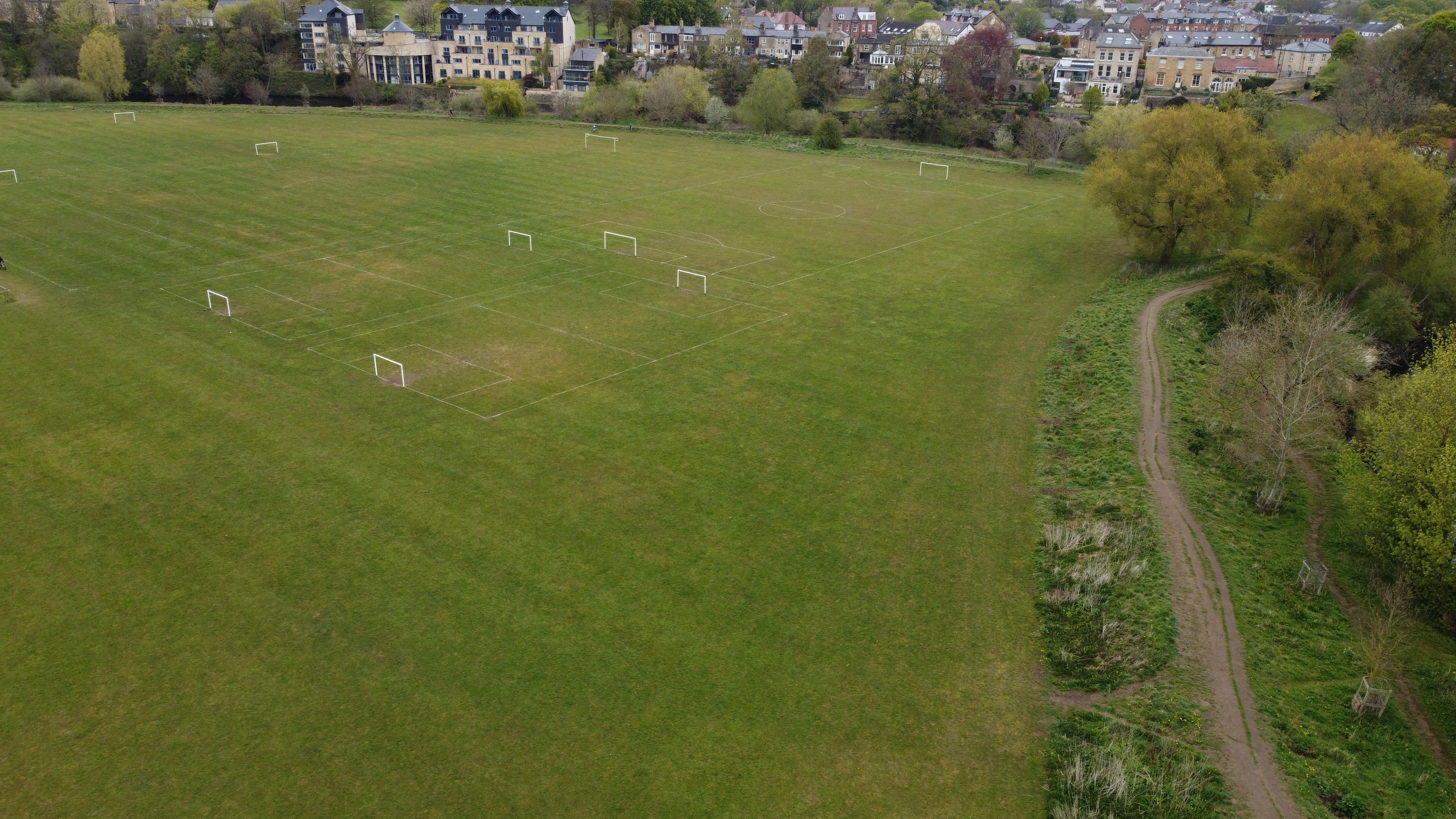
Aerial photograph of the south bank of Wetherby Ings

Wetherby Ings are water meadows, by the River Wharfe now used as parkland in Wetherby, West Yorkshire, England. The ings on the north and south bank are used as parkland and for sports grounds for the town's football and rugby league teams. The area is liable to flooding during heavy rain and the river has broken its banks frequently.

== North bank ==
The north bank, known locally as Scaur Bank or King George's Field is a public space with a football pitch, playground, and open grassland. It is linked to the south bank by footbridge. There is a footpath by the side of the river which before the extension of Linton Golf Club led to Linton Bridge.

== South bank ==
On the south bank are the grounds of Wetherby Athletic AFC and Wetherby Bulldogs RLFC: football, rugby and all-weather pitches, a club house. There is a skate park close to a sports' centre. Fishing and angling takes place along the south bank of the river.
