= Acaster South Ings =

Site of Special Scientific Interest in North Yorkshire, England

Coordinates: 53°53′10″N 01°05′52″W

- Site of Special Scientific Interest
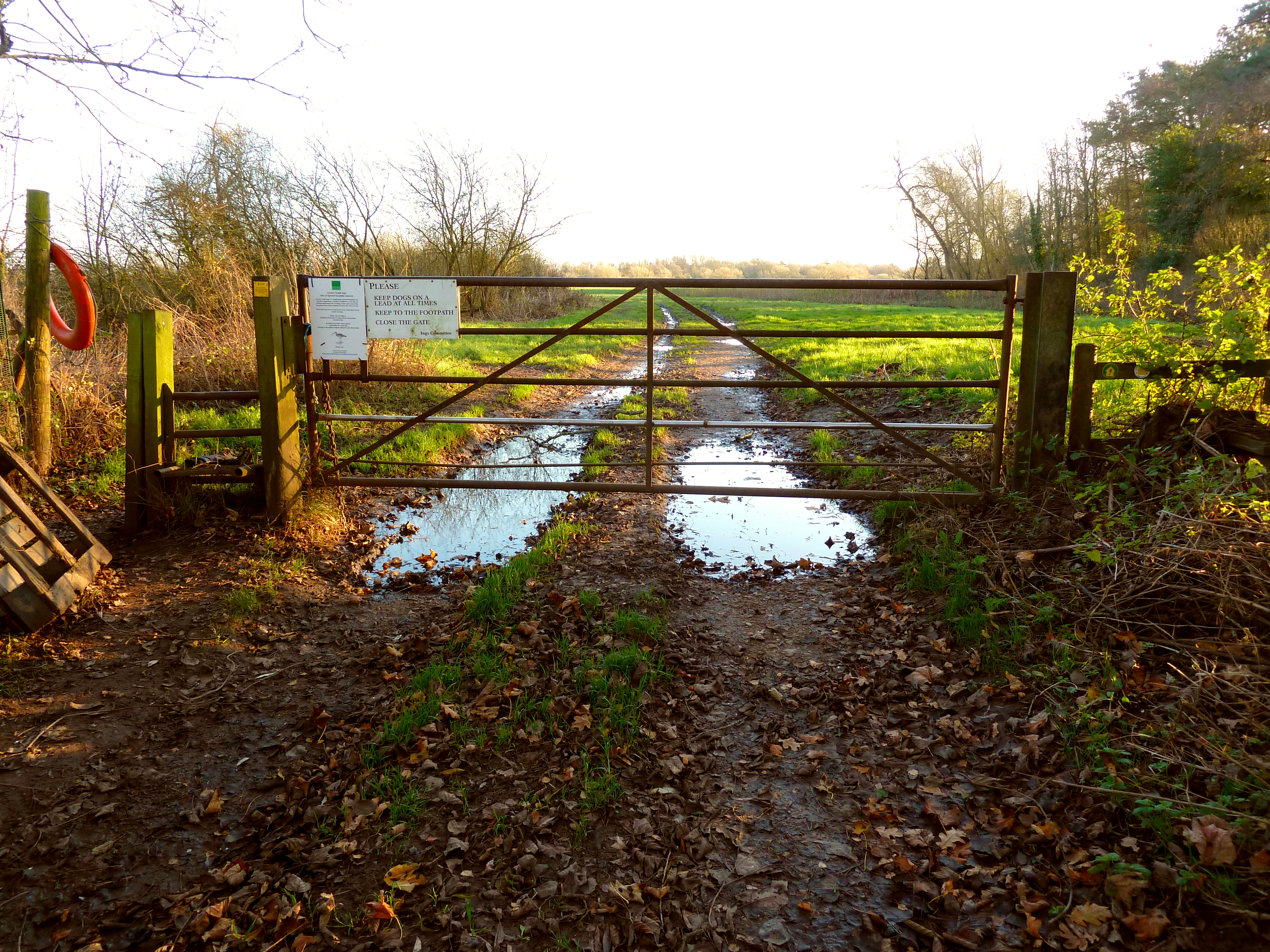
- Acaster South Ings, north gateway
- Location of Acaster South Ings.
- Area of search: North Yorkshire
- Grid reference: SE594437
- Interest: Biological
- Area: 38.3 ha (95 acres)
- Notification date: 1988
- Location map: Magic Map (Defra)

Acaster South Ings is a Site of Special Scientific Interest, or SSSI, near York, England. It consists of two alluvial flood-meadows, and was designated in 1988 because it supports diverse fauna and flora, some of which is rare in the Vale of York area. One of the rarities is the tansy beetle, which feeds on the leaves of the tansy plant.

== Site location and designation ==
Acaster South Ings is a 38.3 hectares (95 acres) biological Site of Special Scientific Interest (SSSI), consisting of "two large alluvial flood-meadows." The meadows are adjacent to the River Ouse and approximately 4 miles (6.4 km) south of York. Such wet grasslands are considered rare in the United Kingdom due to contemporary "drainage and agricultural improvement." The site is accessed on foot via a public footpath along the Ouse riverbank, from Acaster Malbis via Acaster Marine.

The SSSI was first notified in 1988, and is classified under a wildlife enhancement scheme, due to the presence of grasslands containing rare plant and insect life. It is one of nine wildlife SSSIs in the Greater York area, the other designated sites being Strensall Common, Heslington Tilmire, Askham Bog, Fulford Ings, Naburn Marsh, Church Ings, Derwent Ings and River Derwent. It is one of four riverside hay meadow SSSIs listed by the Yorkshire Dales Rivers Trust, alongside Clifton Ings and Rawlcliffe Meadows, Fulford Ings and Naburn Marsh.

== Significant site content ==
=== Flora ===
There are grasses such as great burnet, cock's-foot, creeping bent, meadow foxtail, Yorkshire fog and crested dog's tail.

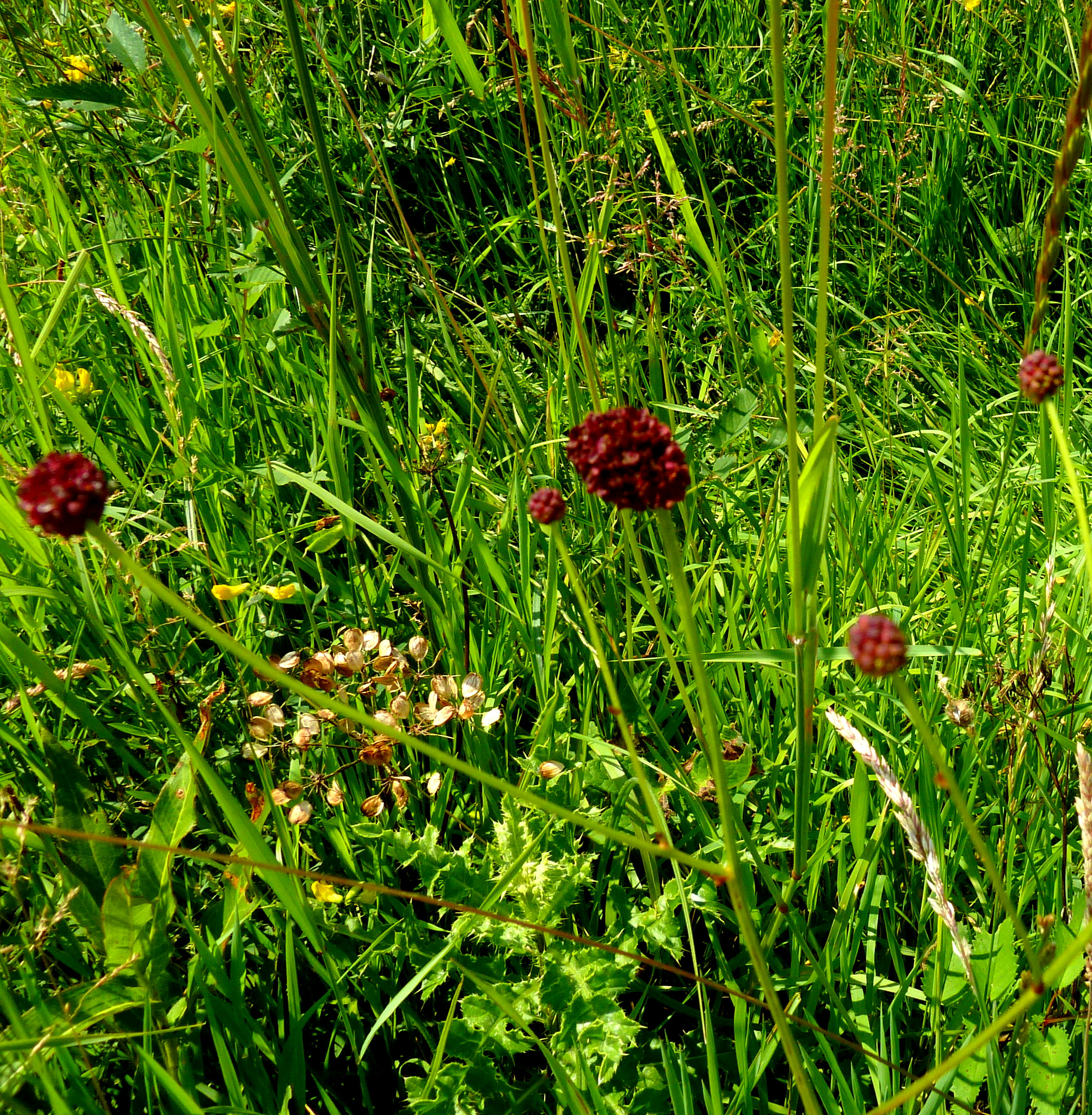
Great burnet at Acaster South Ings

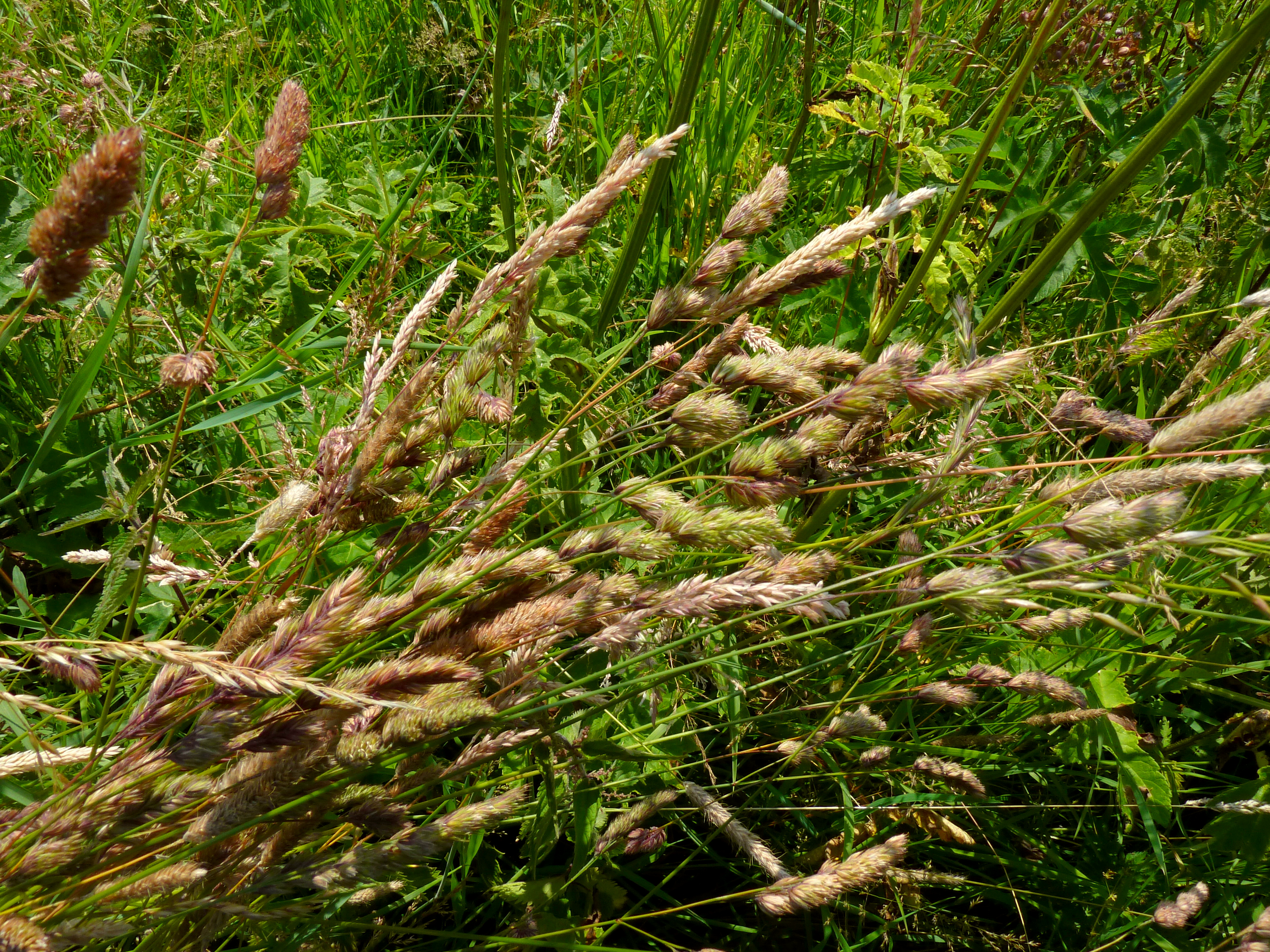
Cock's-foot at the site

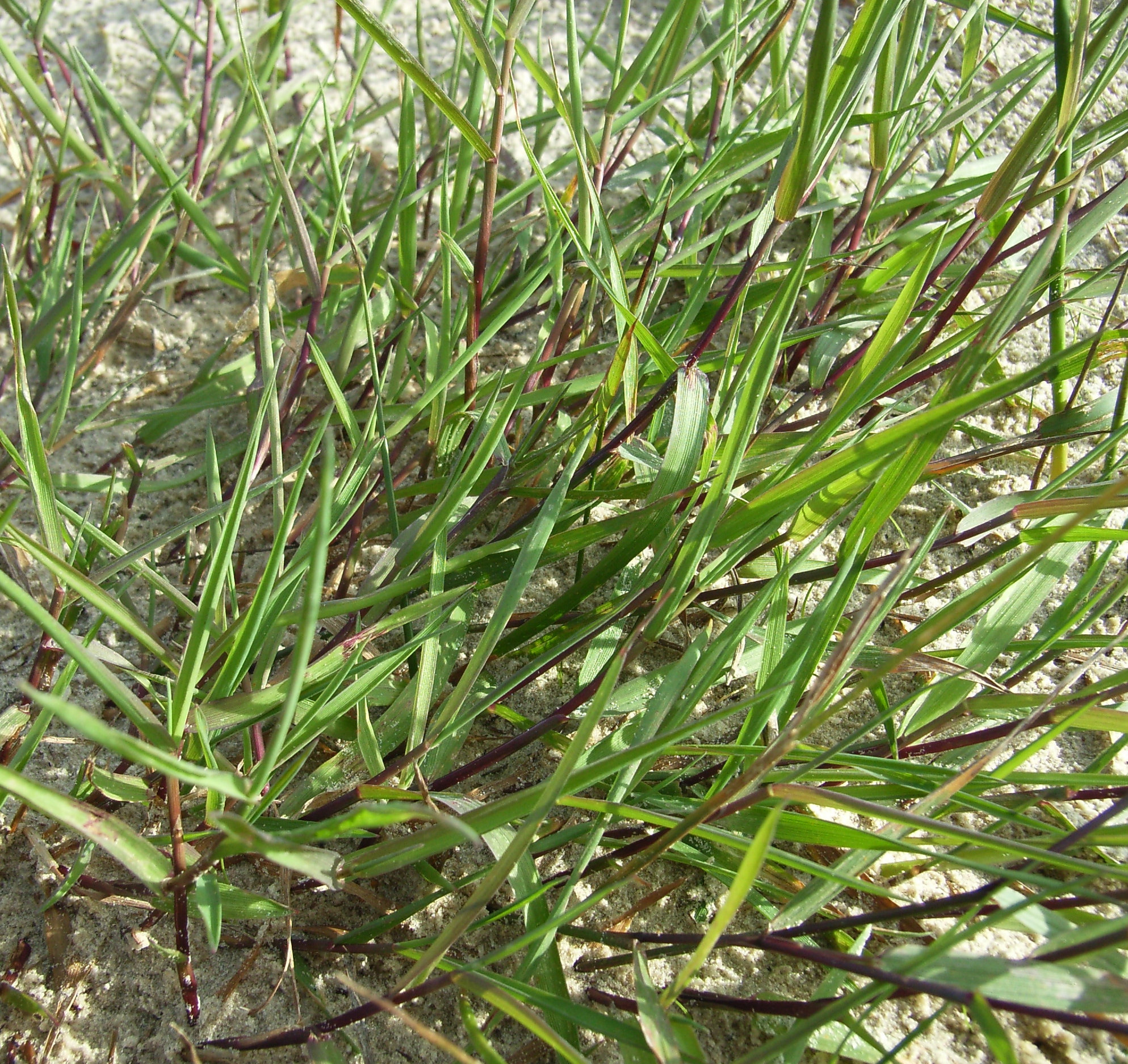
Creeping bent

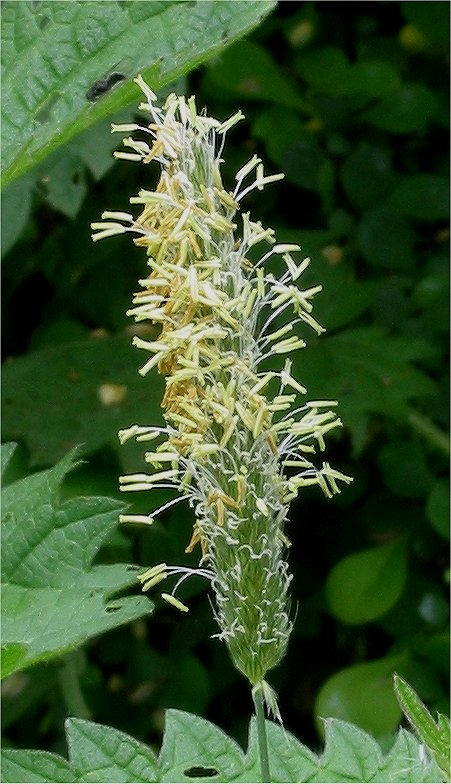
Meadow foxtail

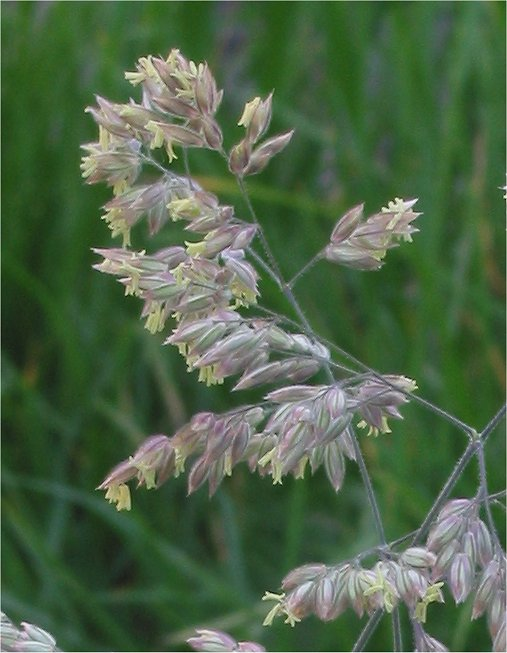
Yorkshire fog

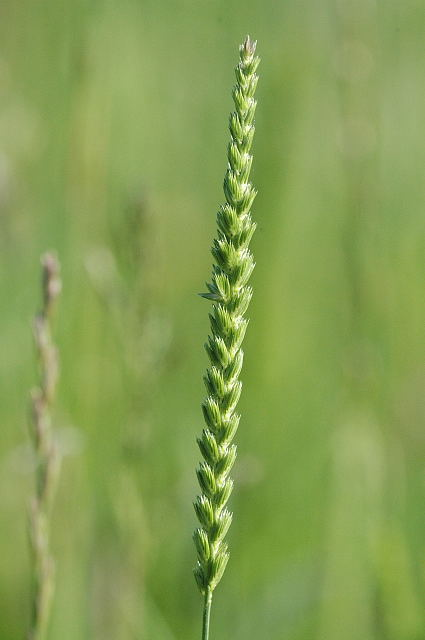
Crested dog's tail

Flowering plants covering the flood meadow include meadow vetchling, ox eye daisy, common sorrel, red clover, creeping thistle, meadowsweet, ribwort plantain and meadow buttercup. There are "distinct stands throughout the grassland" of common bistort, and some areas which contain common meadow rue, and pepper saxifrage.

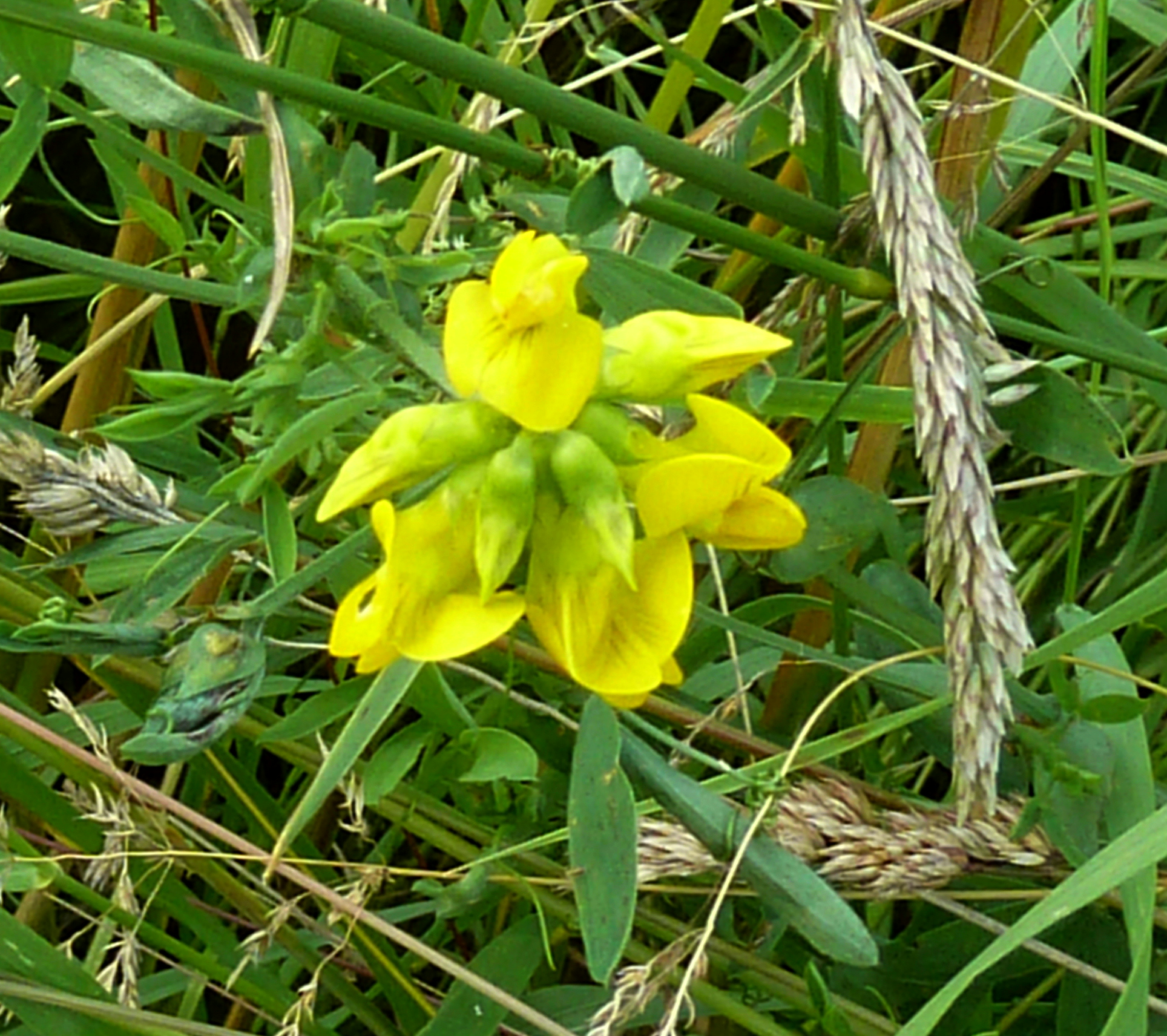
Meadow vetchling at Acaster South Ings

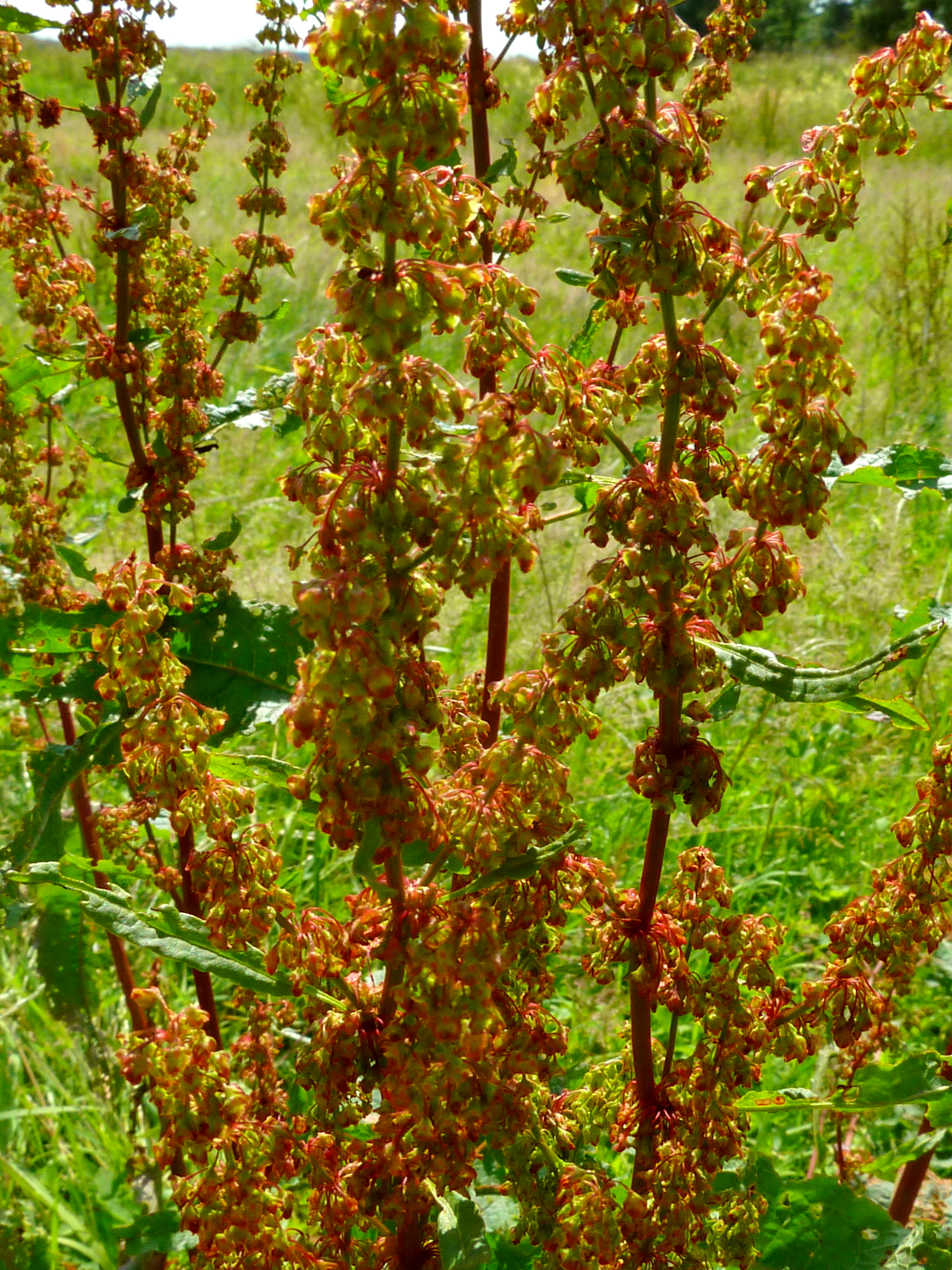
Sorrel or dock at the site

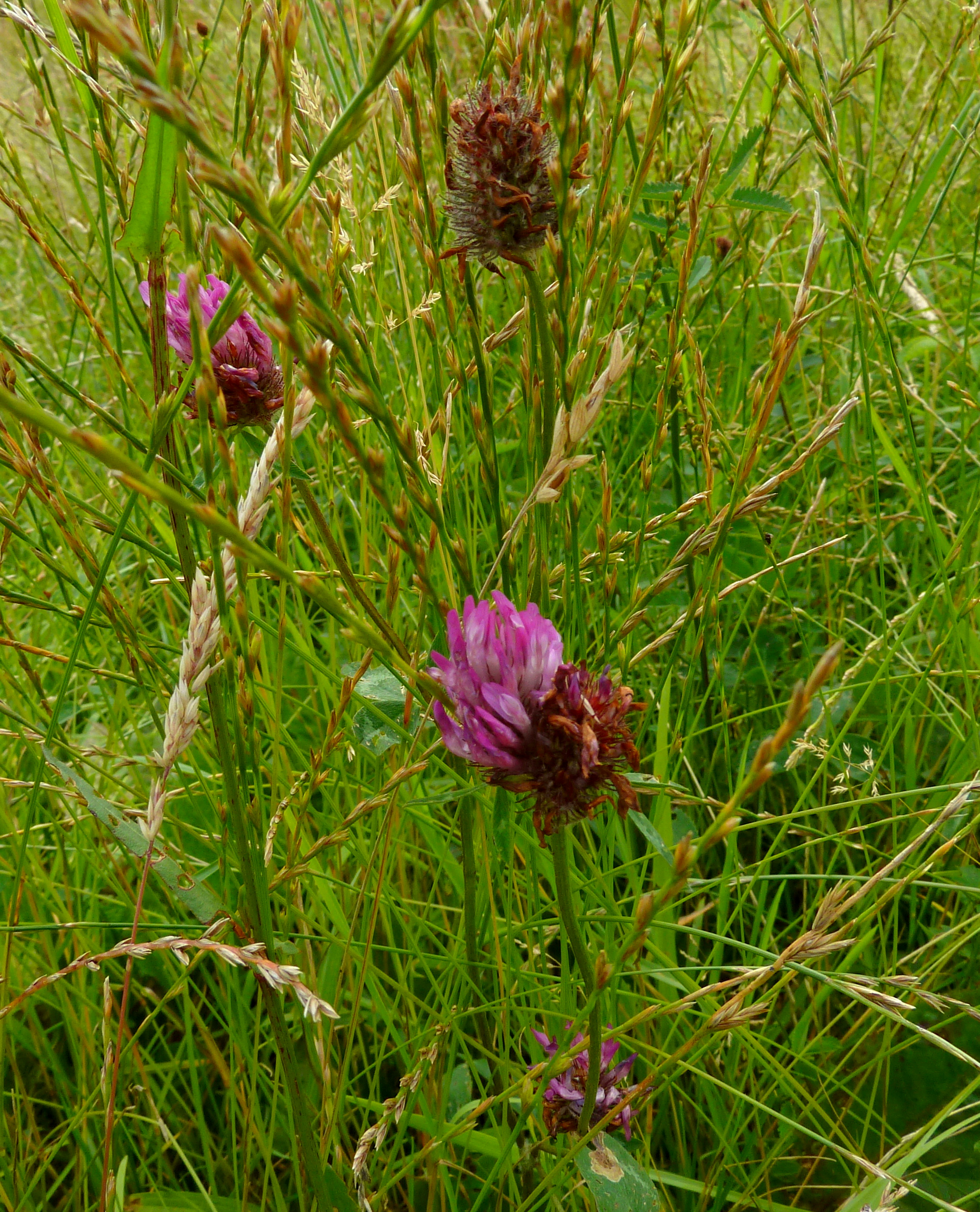
Red clover at the site

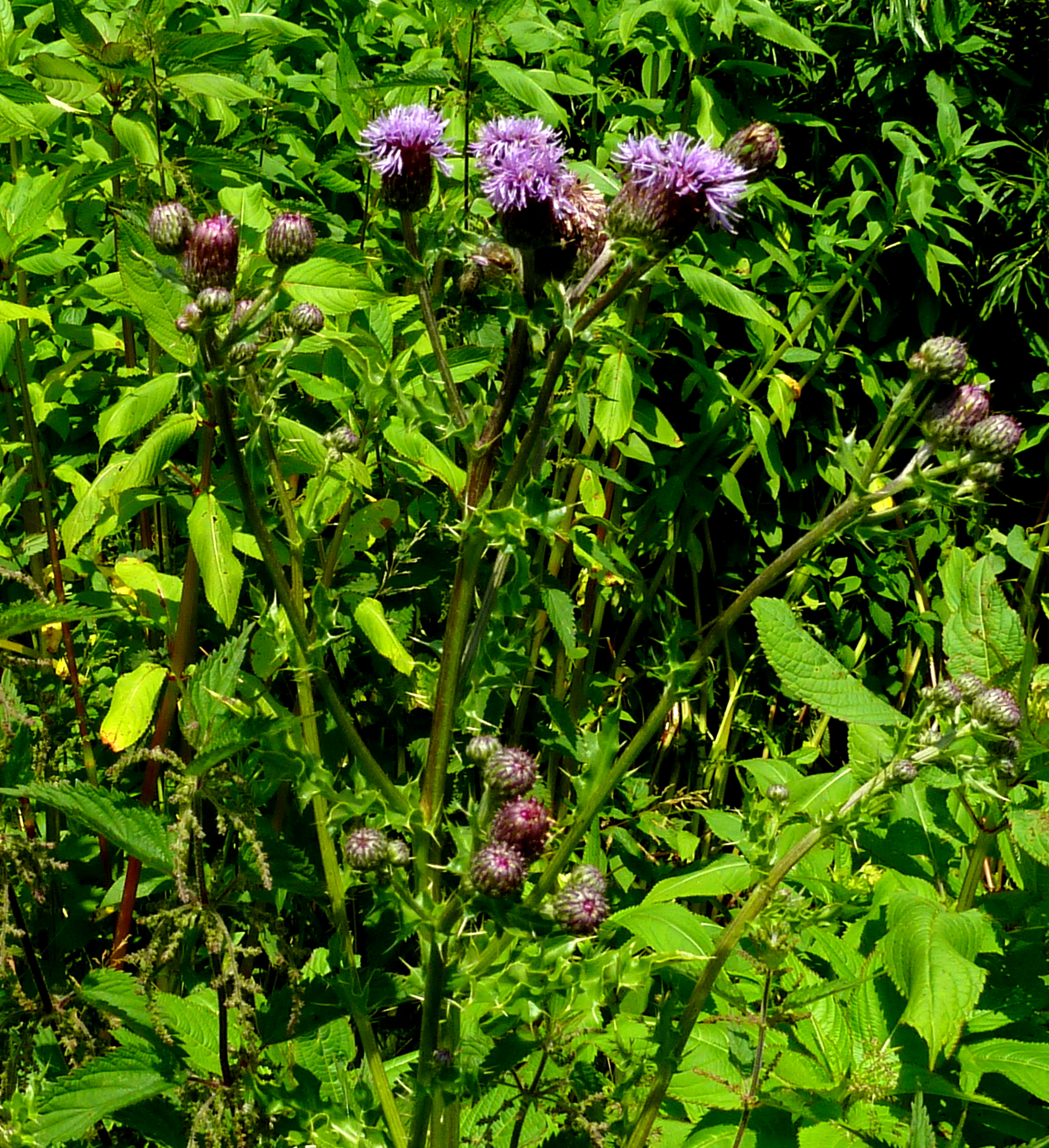
Creeping thistle at the site

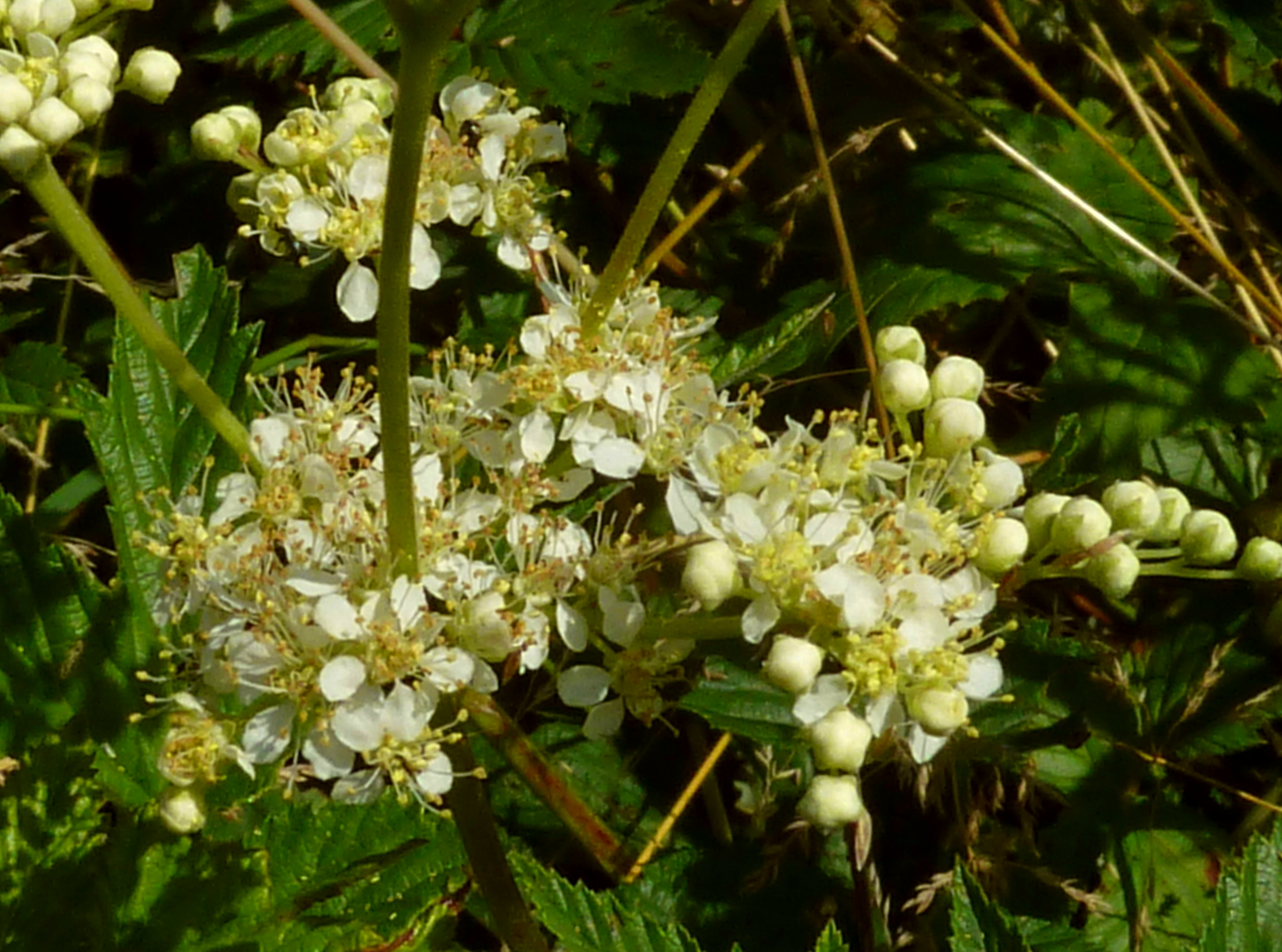
Meadowsweet at the site

The site is protected, by earth dykes, from potential flooding from the adjacent River Ouse. These dykes provide plant habitat which is drier than the flood meadows. Some plants which prefer this drier habitat are meadow cranesbill, field mouse ear and clustered bellflower. Along the riverside are trees and shrubs such as osier and hawthorn, and plants taller than those in the meadows, including tansy, butterbur, common mugwort, reed canary grass and great willowherb.

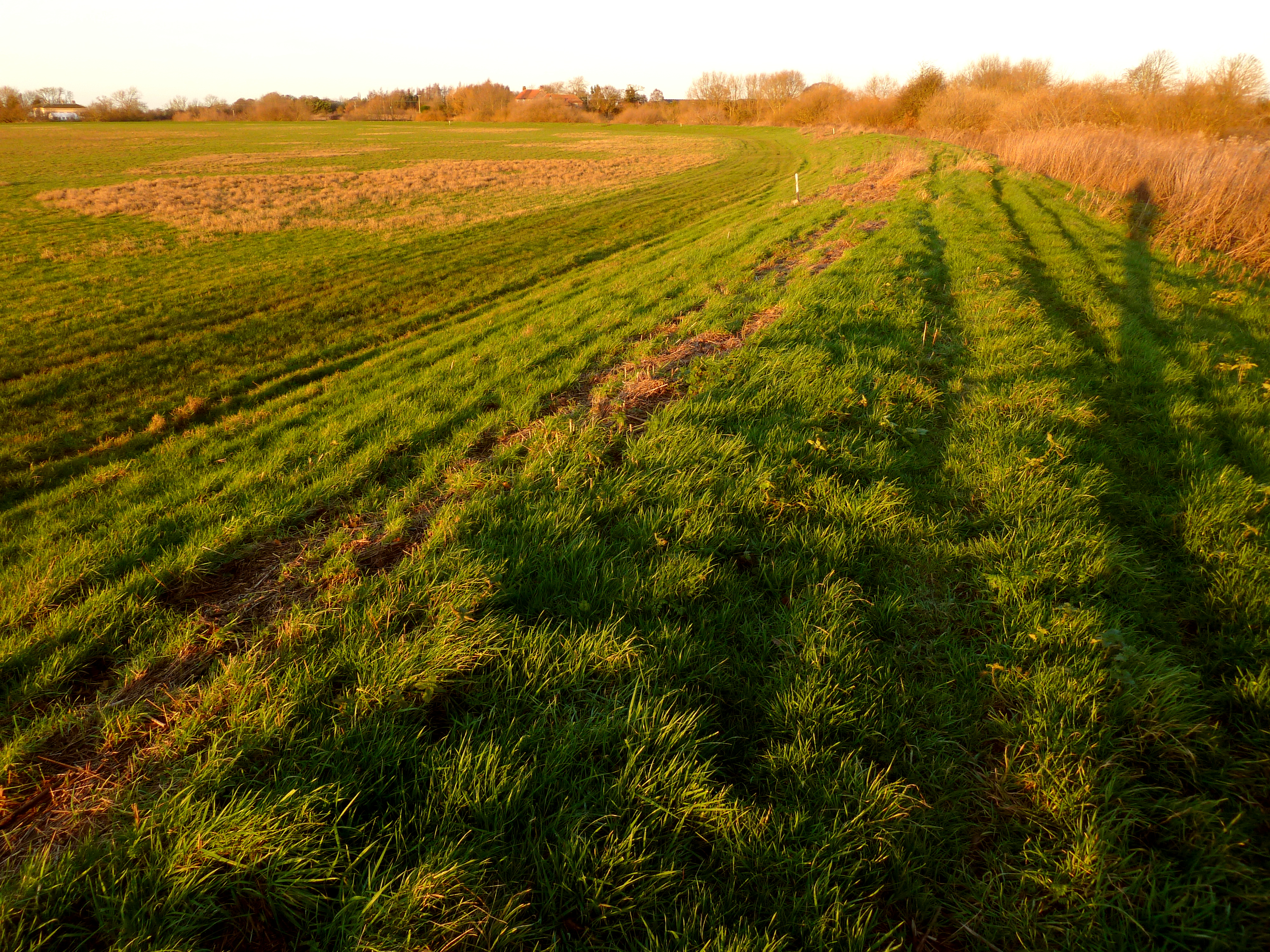
Looking north across Acaster South Ings: grassland (left), dyke (right), riverside shrubs (background)

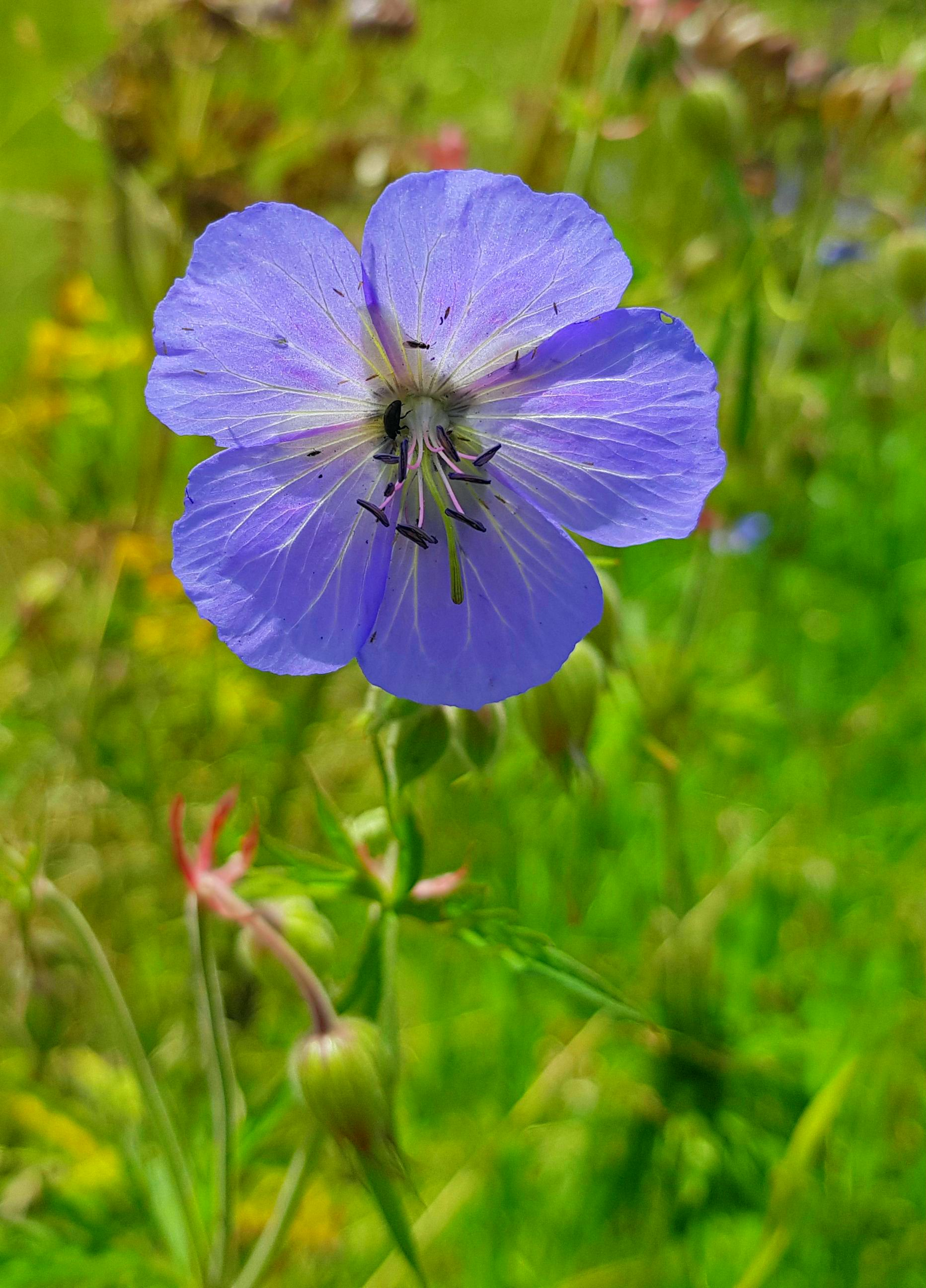
Meadow cranesbill at Acaster South Ings

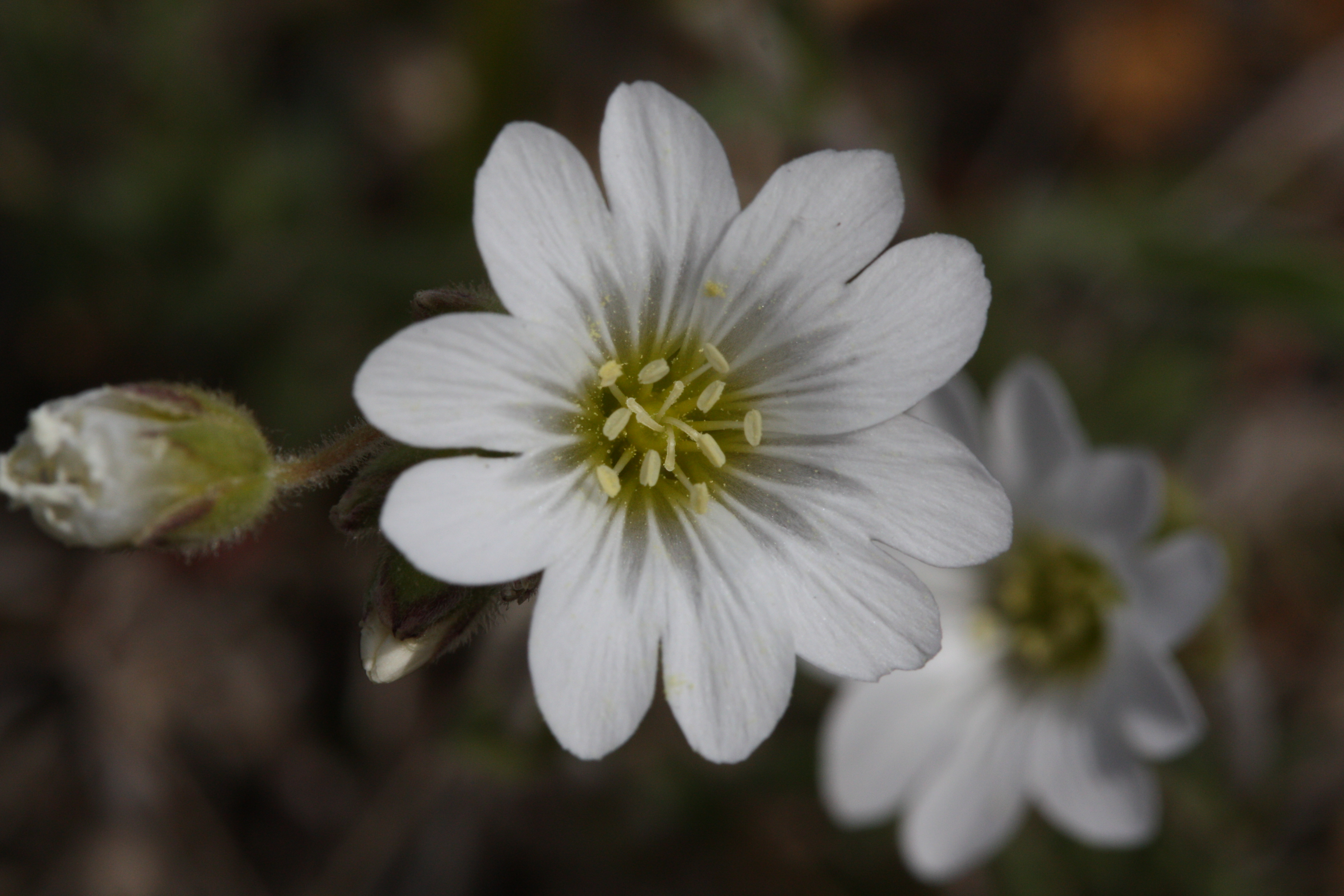
Field mouse ear

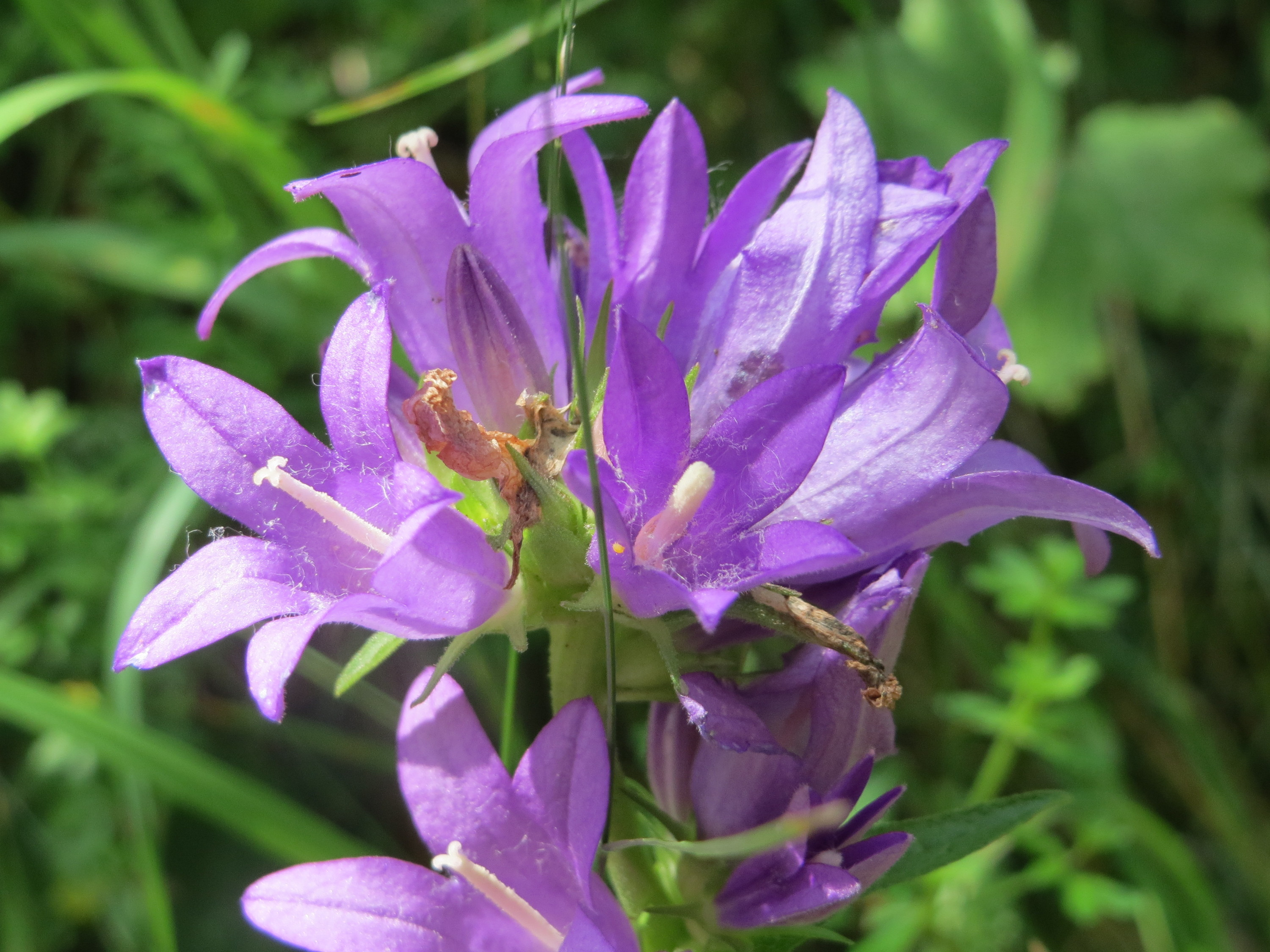
Clustered bellflower

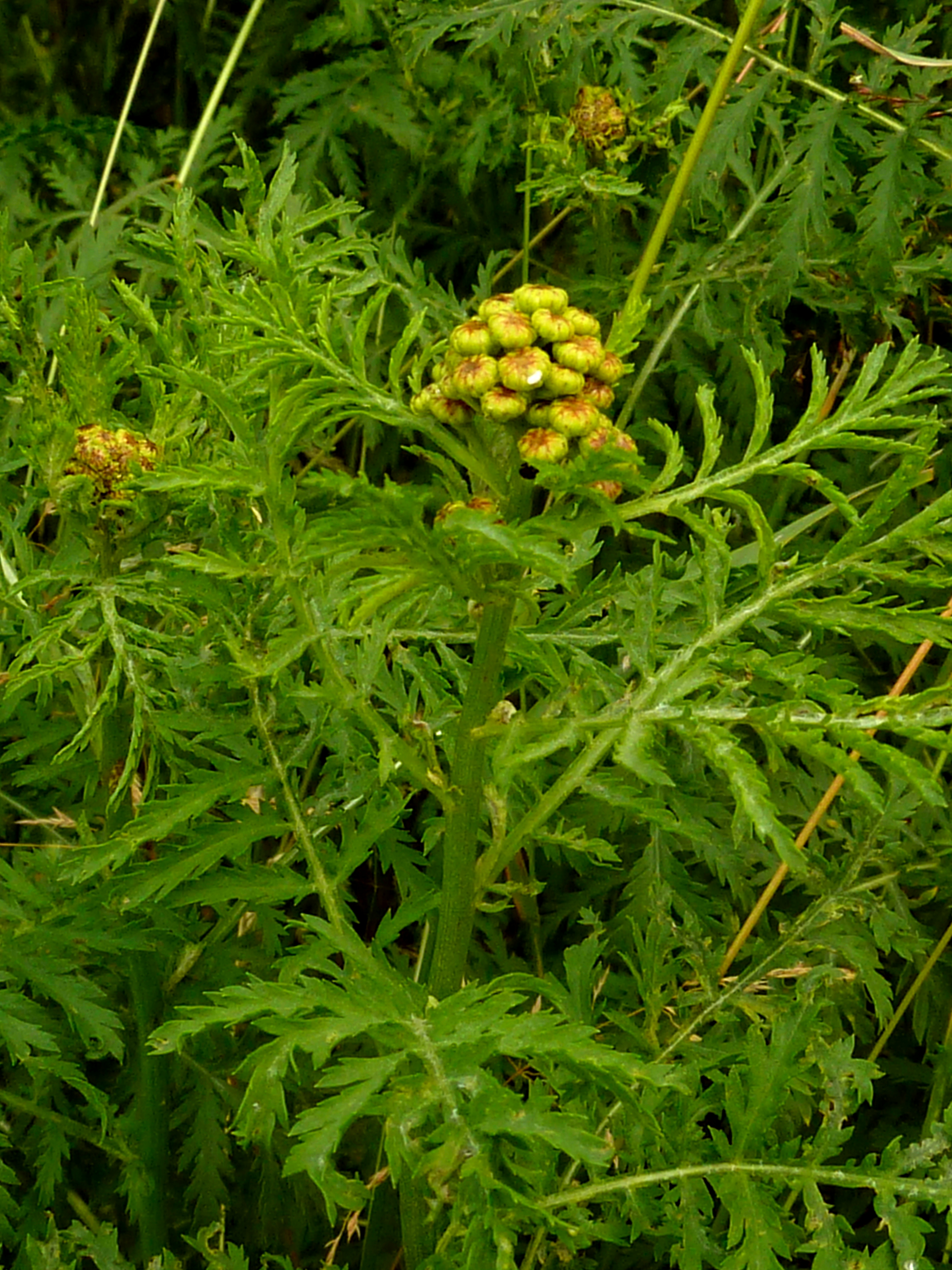
Tansy at the site

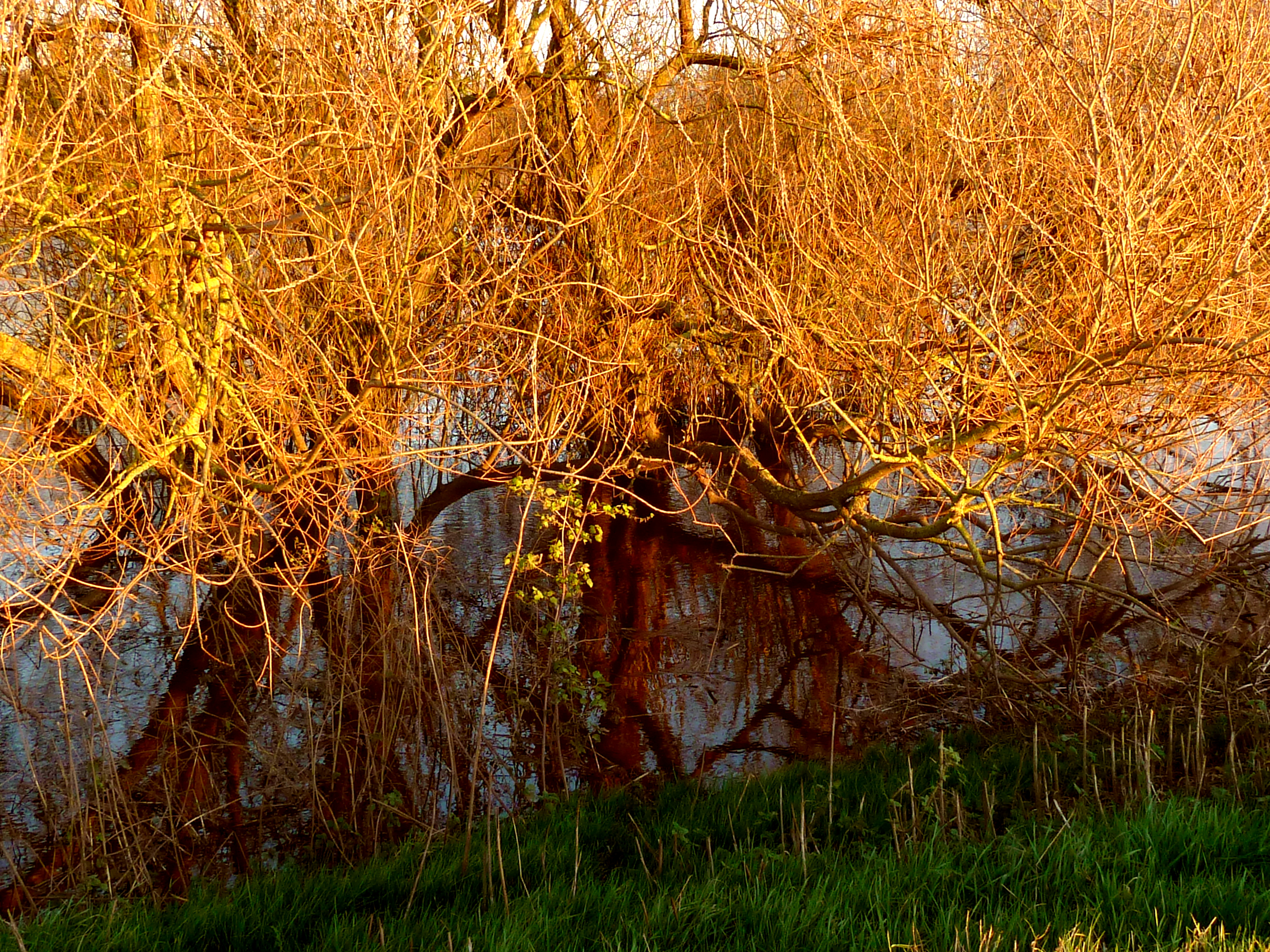
Osiers at the site

=== Fauna ===
There are two beetles which are protected here. The rare tansy beetle feeds on the leaves of the tansy plant, and Aphthona nigriceps (a flea beetle) lives on meadow cranesbill. (Note: An image of Aphthona nigriceps can be seen here, and a description of it is here.) Other insects here are scarab beetle Hoplia philanthus, red soldier beetle, pollen beetle and plant bug Leptoterna flavilabris. The curlew, a wading bird, breeds here. This is "one of few suitable breeding areas for waders" in the Vale of York, so dog walkers are advised to keep dogs on leads during the spring breeding season. (Note: Natural England's notice on the site's entrance gate requests visitors to keep dogs on the lead, and to keep to the footpath on the dyke along the riverside.)

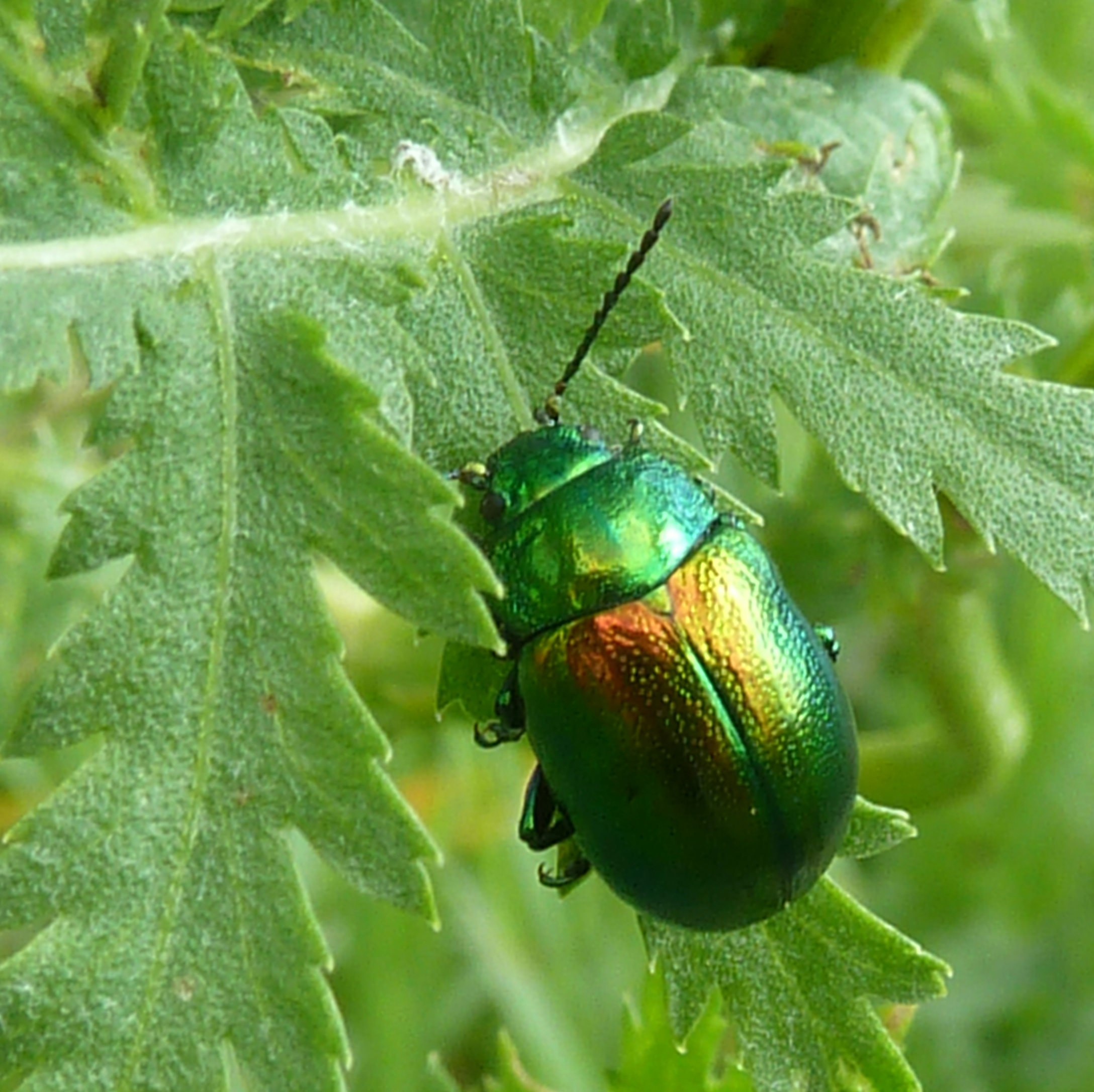
Tansy beetle at Acaster South Ings

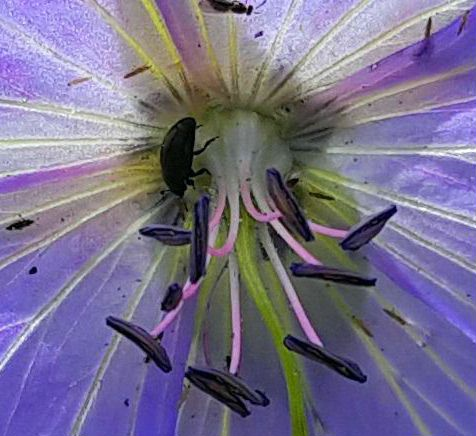
Pollen beetle on meadow cranesbill at the site

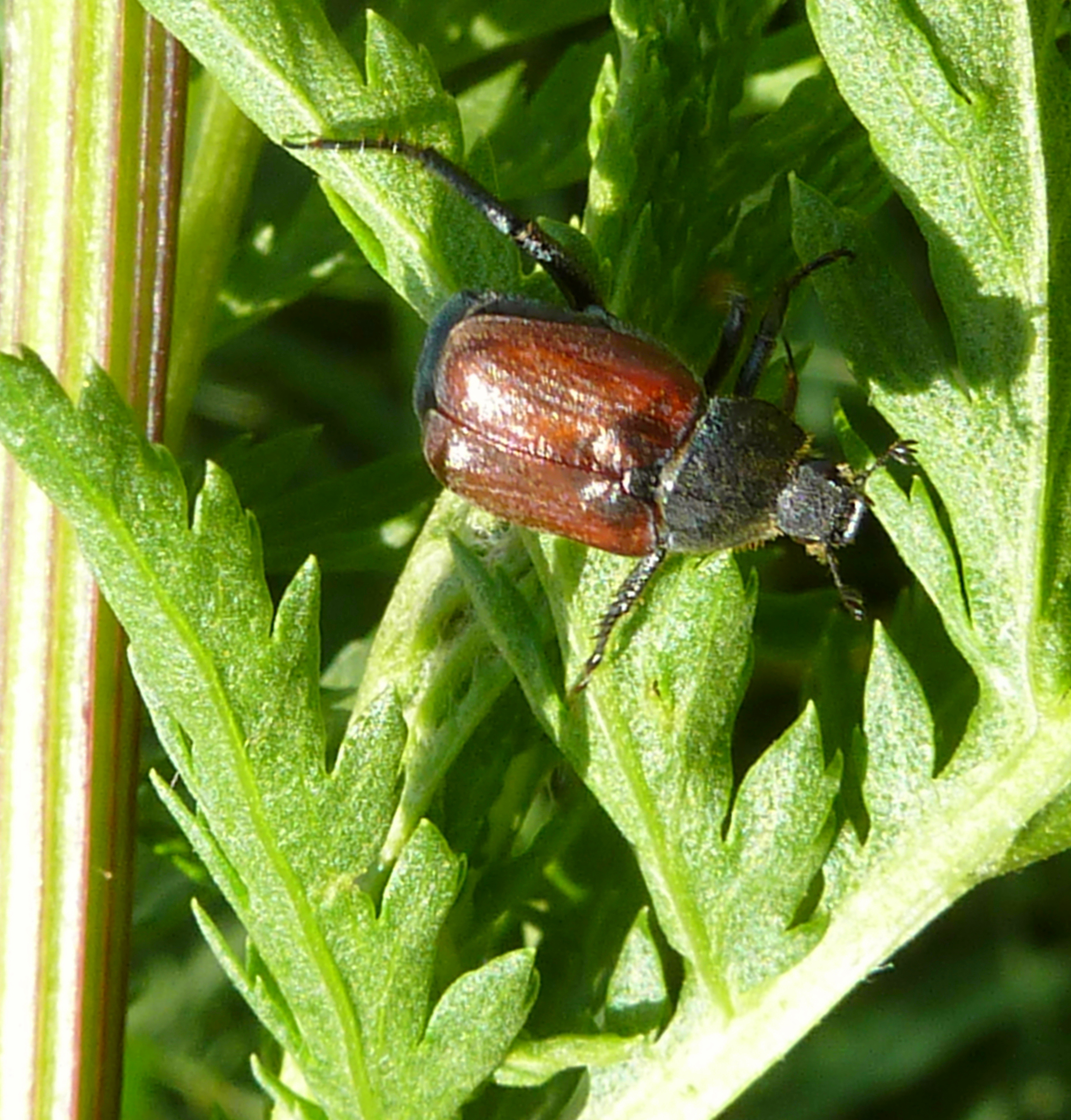
Scarab beetle at the site

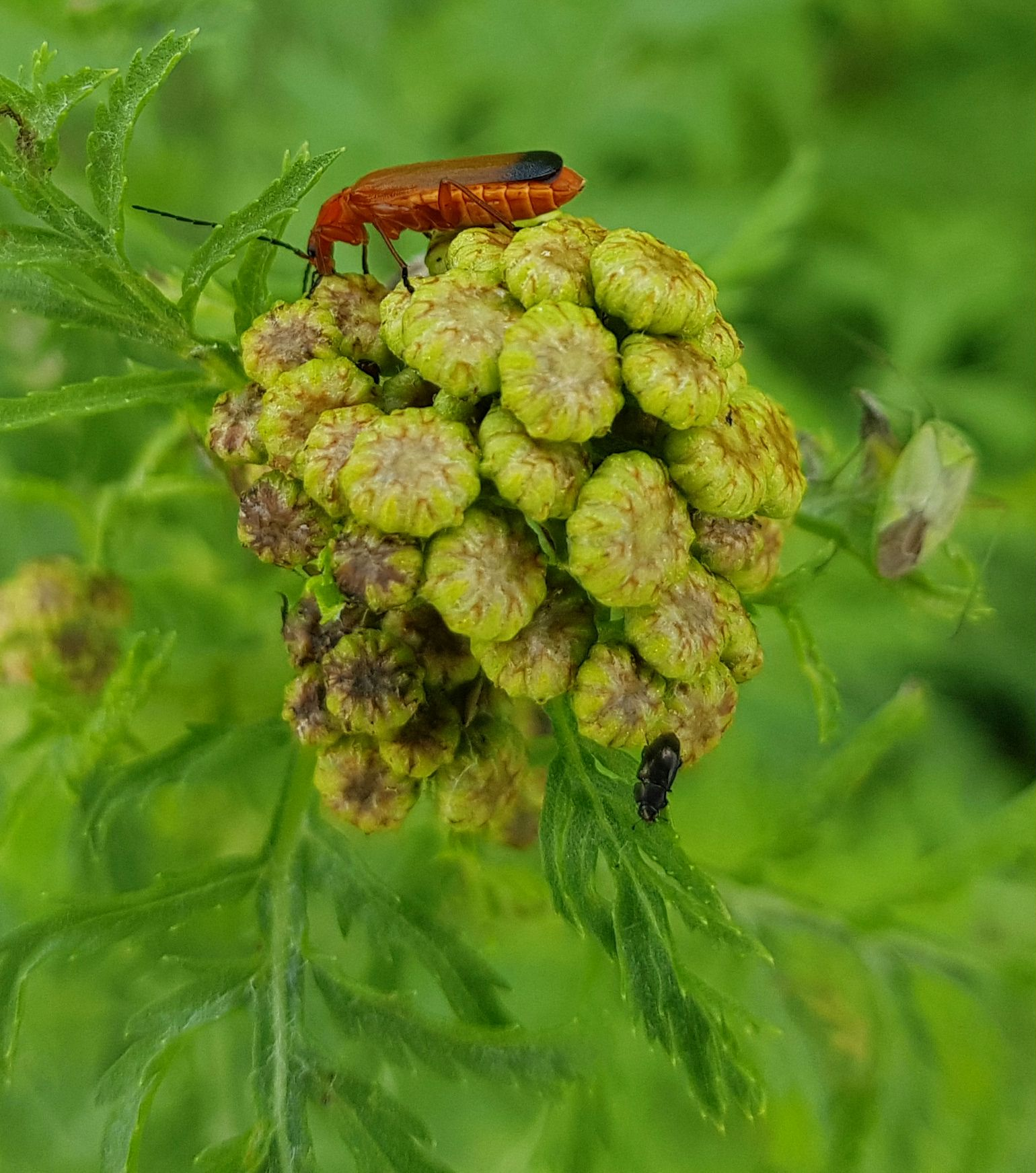
Red soldier beetle at the site

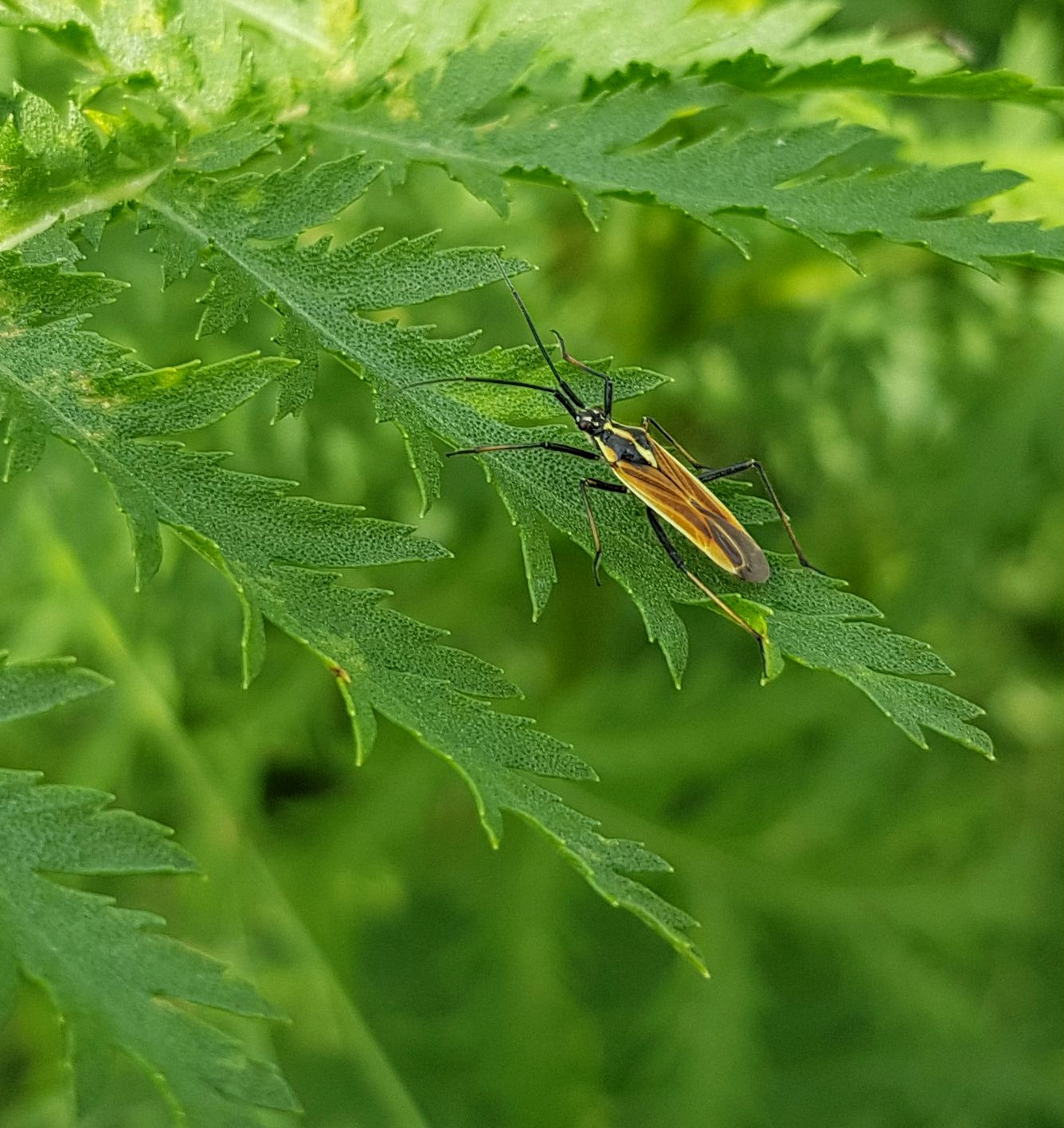
Plant bug at the site

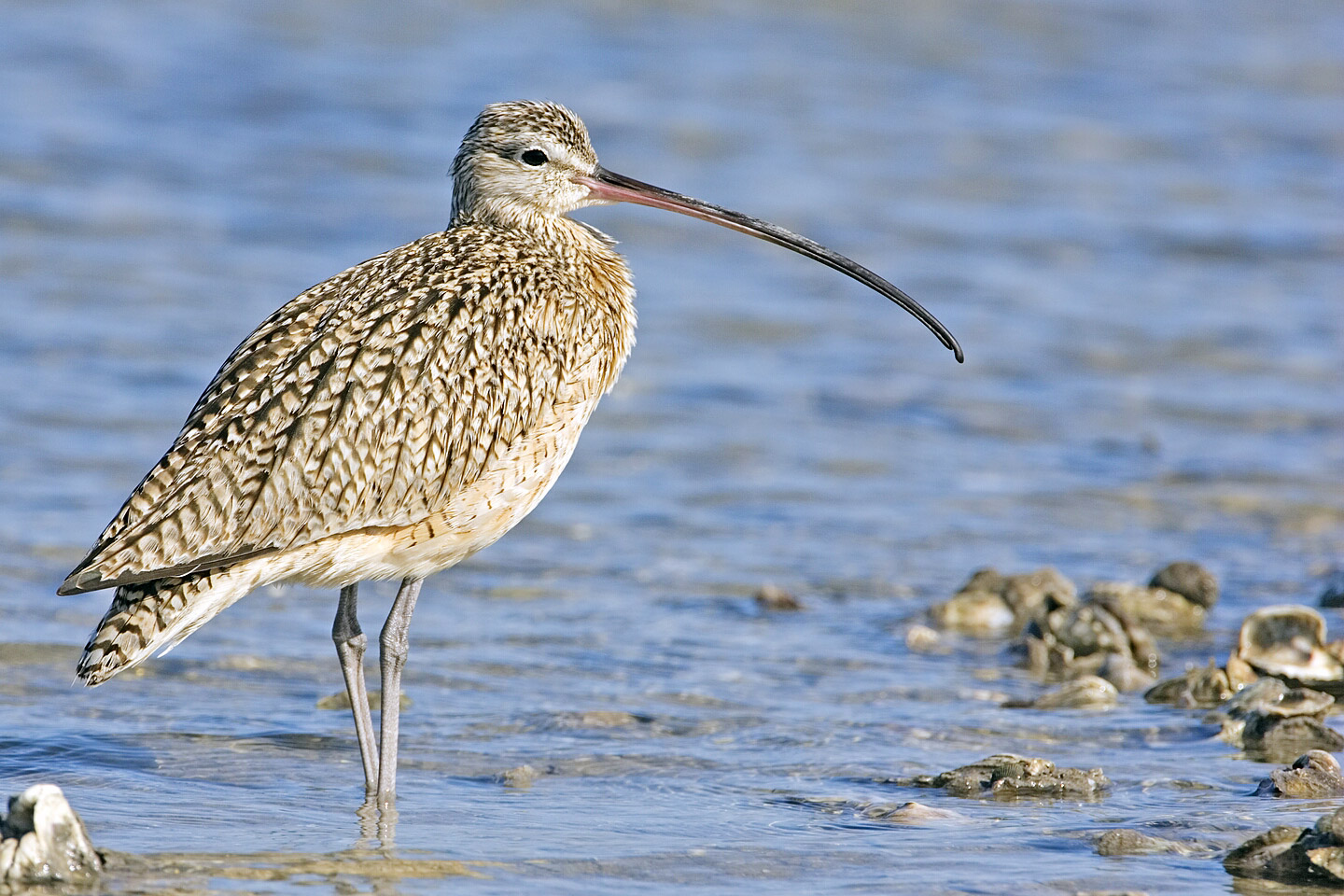
Curlew

== Maintenance ==
"Active management" is required, to conserve the above flora and fauna. Farming practices for the protection of the above species are: "continuation of traditional management for haycropping followed by aftermath grazing in late summer to early autumn." To prevent tall growth and to avoid build-up of decayed vegetation, the fields are cut or mowed in early July after the curlews have bred and the protected plants have set seed. Grazing animals are removed in autumn. There is "regular and careful maintenance of surface drainage including ditches and drains." The condition of the site is described by Natural England as "unfavourable - recovering." The unfavourable condition was specified as "unfavourable development" in Hansard in 2004.

== Development and risk assessment ==
In 2018 the company Renewables First assessed the area for potential effects of the proposed Naburn Weir Hydroelectric Project. The assessment document concluded that the development was "not expected to have an adverse impact on the nearby SSSIs."
