= Flood embankment =

Wall used to shore up flood waters

A flood embankment is traditionally an earth wall used to shore up flood waters.

Most flood embankments are between 1 metre and 3 metres high. A 5-metre-high (16 ft) flood embankment is rare.

Modern improvements to this design include constructing an internal central core made from impermeable substance like clay or concrete, some even use metal pilings.

Some authorities call man-made structures levees.

== Problems ==
Animation of types of floodwall failures
Overtopping some flood embankments are designed to overtop example Clifton, Rawcliffe and Poppleton Ings
When not by design, the crest can wash away and cause a breach
Structural failure If any weakness is detected under strong water pressure, the compromise is soon exacerbated
Rotation When the structure has moved of its axis causing an exposed area to be washed away
Sliding When the structure has moved sideways exposing the foundation to erosion as well as allowing gaps in between the structures
Seepage When water infiltrates under the structure. This is caused by burrowing animals like dogs, beavers, badgers and otters
Piping When water finds its way under the structure and collects on the other side. A central core is normally designed in to prevent piping

The main problem is the space required to construct and maintain such a structure. A flood embankment of 2.5 metres high requires an outreach of 15 metres, which makes it unsuitable in some areas. To prevent seepage through the embankment a central core is added to acquire stability and integrity.

== Examples ==
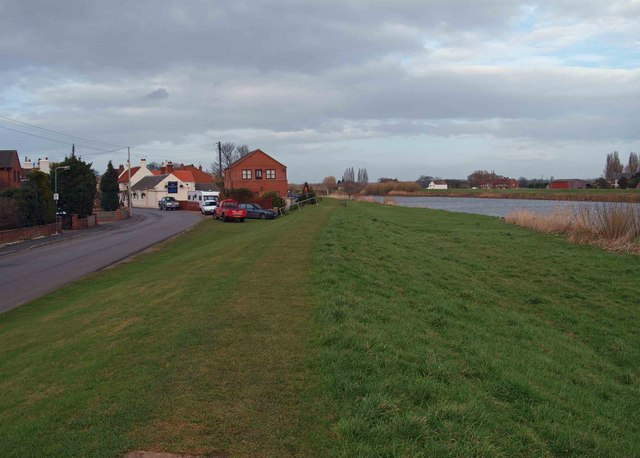

Clifton, Rawcliffe, Poppleton and Leeman ings in York

River Gowan, Cumbria

River Trent

== Animation ==
This is an animation showing a flood event overwhelming neighbouring properties and the added construction of a flood embankment and flood warning and protection statuses.
