= Clifton, Rawcliffe and Poppleton Ings =

Flood water storage area in York, England

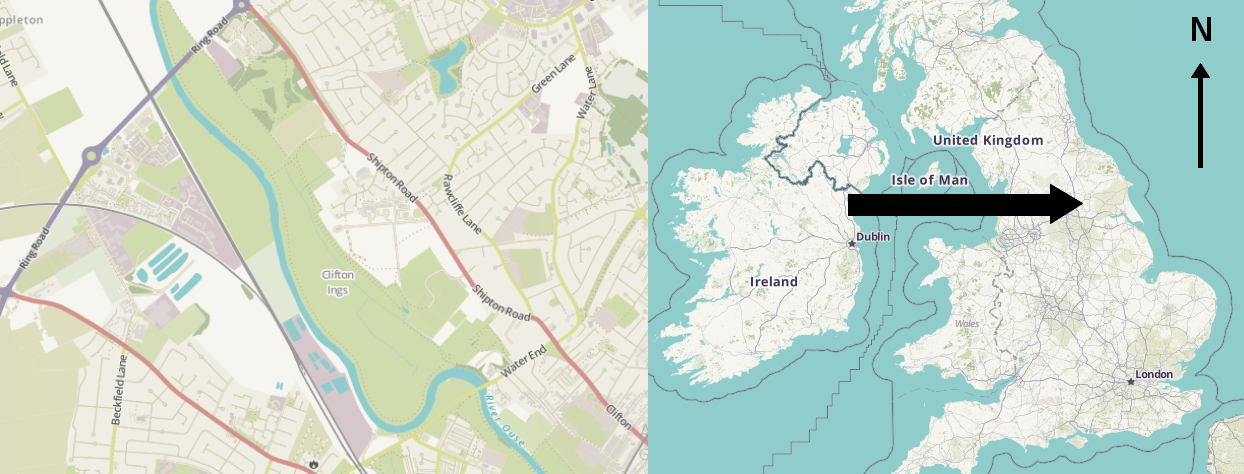

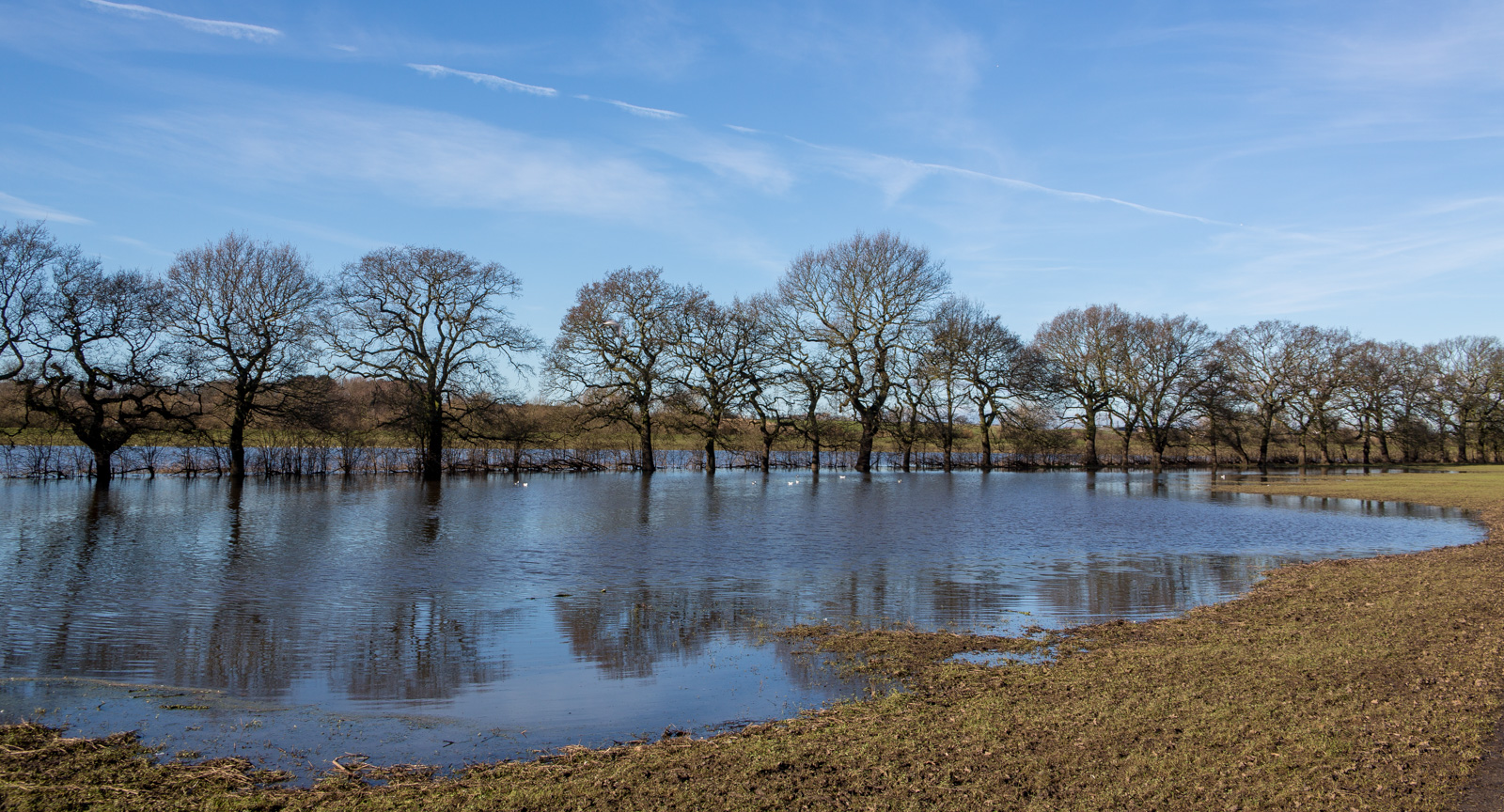

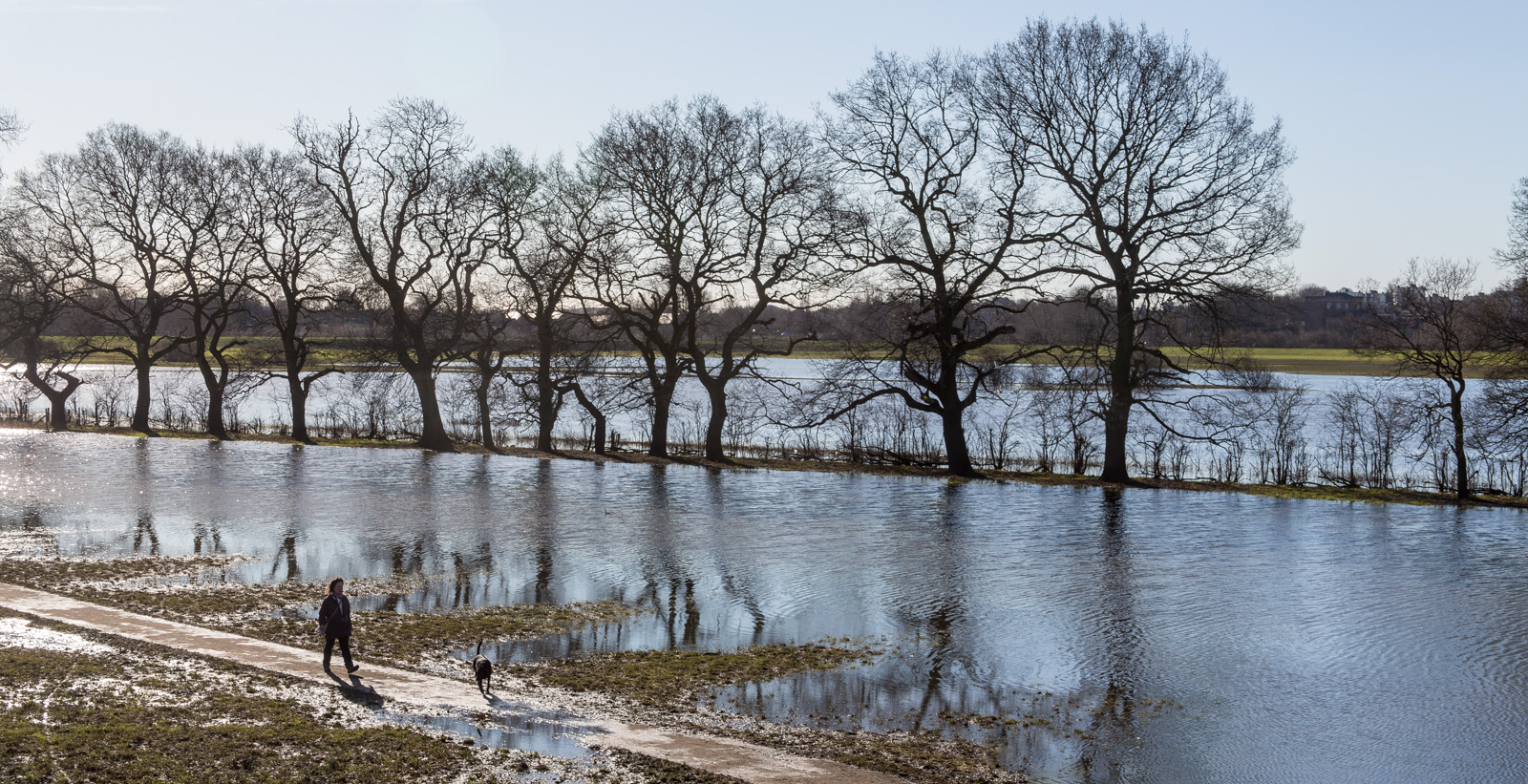

Clifton, Rawcliffe and Poppleton ings are temporary storage area (washland scheme) for water that flows down the River Ouse in York, England.

Approximately 2,300,000 cubic metres (81,000,000 cu ft) of water is able to be stored here which lowers the flood level by about 150 mm (5.9 in) in the city.

Sluice gates on the north and south side allow water to enter and leave.

During the summer months the grassland is used by local farmers to graze their cattle.

In 1982, £1.25 million, was spent on increasing the height and adding sluice gates as well as heightening the embankments to allow greater storage of water.

The design of the ings allow for accommodation of water for a medium order flooding.

In the event of a higher order flooding, the embankments allow overflow thus increasing capacity of the ings.

== Embankments (floodwalls) ==
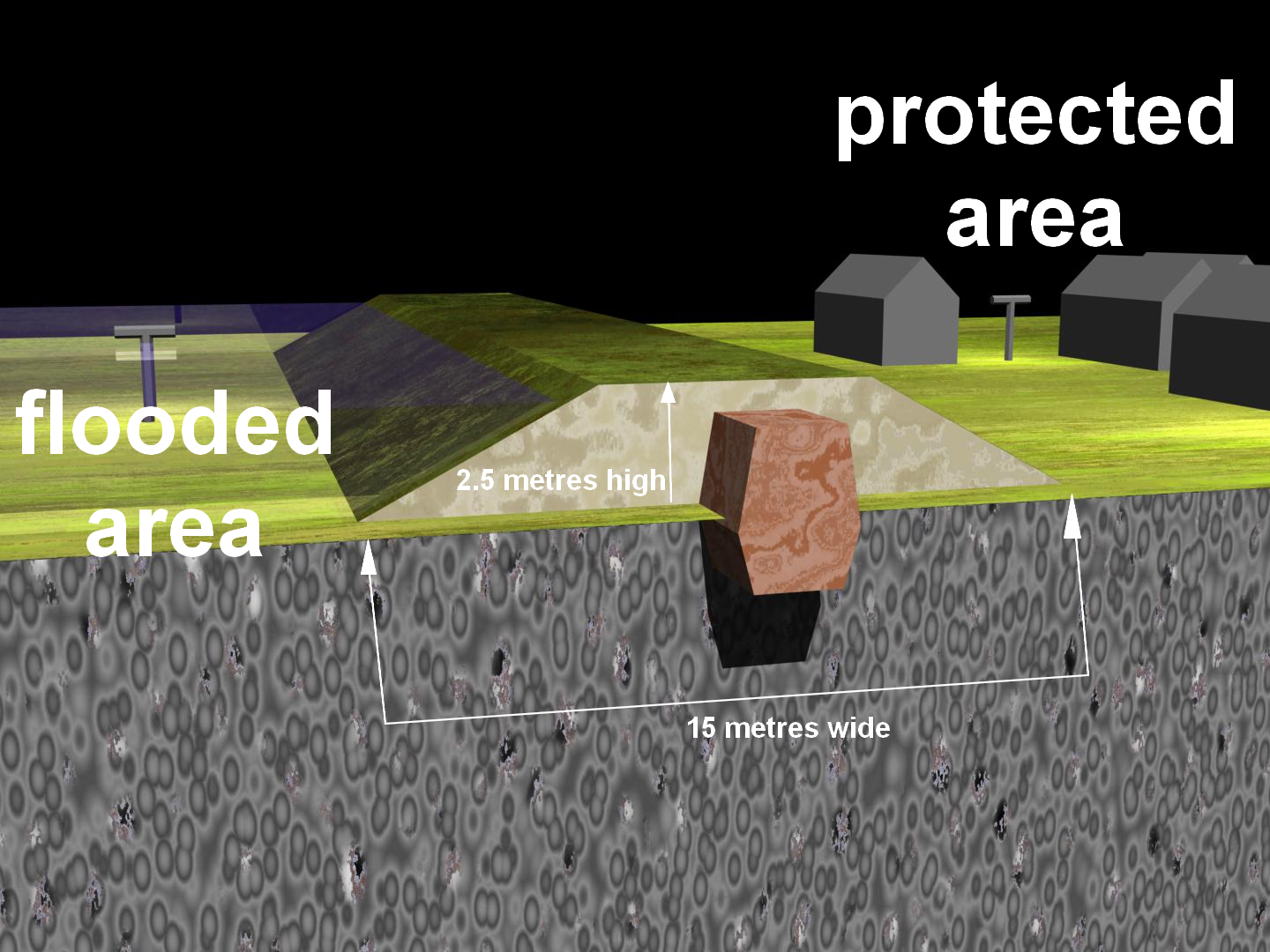

This area makes use of a lot of embankments.

An embankment 2.5 metres (8 ft 2 in) high typically has a footprint 15 metres (49 ft) wide which makes it unsuitable in some areas.

Within the embankment there is a central core, either clay or man made structure like concrete or metal piling. This gives added integrity and prevents water from seeping through under or over the embankment.

== Flood scheme ==
This is one of many flood defences that make up a scheme. Other projects include River Foss Barrier, Leaky dams, ings, washland storage basin, walls, and embankments.

After the flooding on 26 December 2015, the UK government proposed a complete rethink on national flood defences.

One project that showed promise with the added benefit of a fraction of the cost of concrete barrier is the Pickering flood defences that composed a plan to store as much water upstream to allow soaking into the surrounding areas and prevent flooding downstream.

== Animation ==
Animation of flooded properties and addition of embankment with central core and warning

This animation shows the increased water intake of the River Ouse, spilling over its banks into surrounding farmlands and being stored temporary in the Clifton ings. Sluice gates on the other side (south side) are opened when needed. Extra pumps can also be utilised to drain the ings. The animation is taken from the north side looking south.

When the river Ouse level rises above 4.27 metres (Above Ordinance Datum) AOD at Ouse bridge, the order is given to raise the sluice gates at Clifton ings. 3.3 million cubic metres of flood water are stored here which lowers the York city centre flood level by 150mm preventing further flood damage.
