= Leaky dam =

Flood prevention measure

Leaky dams are a flooding prevention measure, moderating the flow of water downstream. Barriers are added to a stream/river to prevent soil and silt escaping and allowing water to escape at a slower rate.

== History ==
With the regular flooding of settlements in the UK, a rethink on flood risk management was initiated. One of the proposals put forward was containing flood waters at source to prevent large volumes of water flowing downstream causing soil erosion and flooding of properties.

A variety of solutions was put forward including using naturally occurring composting materials in path of flow to hold valuable fertile silt and dam up waters over many small dams. This kind of structure does occur naturally with positive impact on flood defence. A leaky dam was added to the arsenal of flood prevention tools. Logs from fallen trees are placed at intervals down the stream acting as a barrier, holding the silt and small debris back and allowing just the water that overflows the structure to continue the course of the stream.

== Benefits ==
The area surrounding the leaky dams have many benefits including better quality of water to life behind the barrier, prevention of soil erosion, available nutrients for wildlife, stabilisation of river banks, spawning ground for aquatic life, rooting habitat, place of nesting birds, areas of growth for microbes, algae and fungi, efficient temporary storage of water and a slow release of water into surrounding area.

== Soil erosion ==
After a heavy downpour, soil, gravel, silt and valuable nutrients are lost when the rains wash away the top soil. This animation of a side view of a mountain embankment shows how bad soil management contributes to tonnes of topsoil ending up in flood areas and river beds. It costs a fortune to collect the soil from river beds, estuaries and river mouths, decontaminate, transport and physically replace the reclaimed sand.

== Examples ==
Barriertypes	types of barriers used in leaky dams

Theses are types of barriers used by organisations in UK to prevent soil erosion and flooding downstream.

The following are possible approaches:

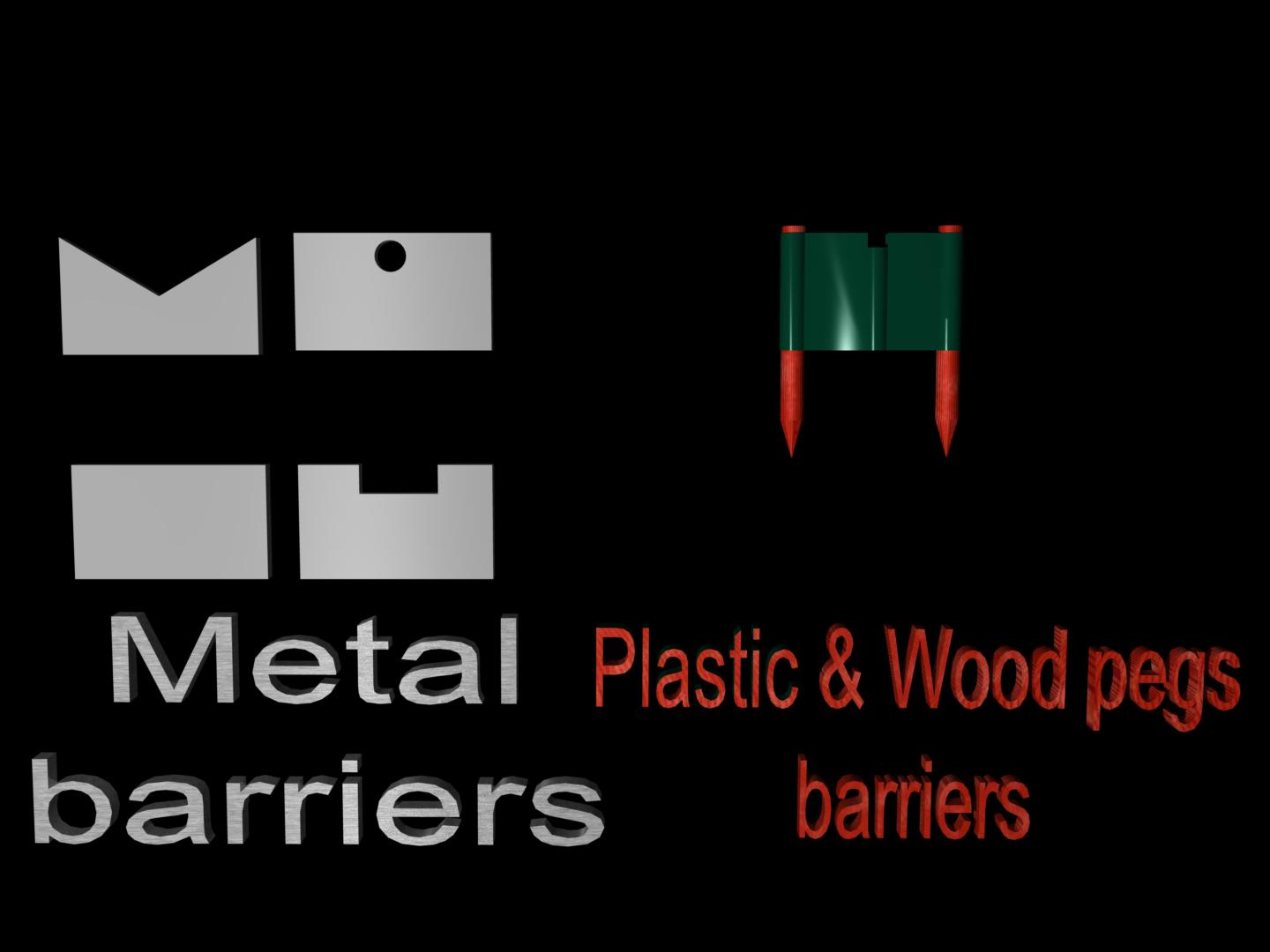
Barriertypes
One method is to act construct a barrier so when the fallen trees and shrubs are placed behind the barrier the running water and debri is prevented from washing away. This method is more effective than the one below as it holds more water back, has a higher level of overflow and more valuable fertile silt is retained. More vegetation is able to be supported behind the barrier due to the higher level of nutrients captured from debri and silt. Aquatic life is able to populate and continue to multiply with limited inventions. This method shows better results.
Another method is to place fallen logs in a zigzag pattern that would mimic nature in the event of a natural felling. Water isn't dammed up as much with this method but valuable silt is still filtered and not lost downstream. Aquatic life can move between barriers and continue upstream. This method is favoured by environmental groups who claim that it closely resembles nature.
The idea of these dams is to create a method whereby the water can slowly drain into the surrounding water table. Surrounding vegetation is able to absorb more water and nutrients from standing body of water rather than a flowing one The larger the tree, the better the root growth, the more water is absorbed and the more soil is held together. Some trees can absorb hundreds of litres per day, making it a very effective water collection system

== Observations ==
Many county bodies have initiated their own trials and photographic and video recordings show positive results.

A well known project in Pickering, North Yorkshire, UK showed how effective leaky dams can be when there projected flooding risk assessment dropped from a 25% probability to about 4%.

Artificial leaky dams constructed from injection molded plastic have also been tried in some areas. Some of the benefit derived from this method is the wall doesn't corrode or compost over time requiring less management.

These are deemed soft defenses as opposed to hard defenses that include solid concrete retaining walls that cost a fortune and are unsightly to local people.

It would seem local residents, environmental agencies, local councils and budget managers are more open to a natural flow system that mimics nature and holds large volumes of water back for later draining. The biggest motivator is this method costs a fraction of the hard defenses that professional government agencies have been promoting.
