= Frederick Cooper =

Frederick or Fred Cooper may refer to:

- Fred Cooper (bicyclist) (1852–1935), professional racing cyclist and bicycle manufacturer
- Fred Cooper (cricketer, born 1888) (1888–1958), Essex cricketer
- Fred Cooper (cricketer, born 1921) (1921–1986), Lancashire and Worcestershire cricketer
- Fred Cooper (footballer) (1934–1972), professional footballer for West Ham United in the 1950s
- Fred Cooper (illustrator), Society of Illustrators's Hall of Fame
- Frederick Augustus Cooper (1834–1908), Australian politician
- Frederick Henry Cooper (1827–1869), deputy commissioner of Amritsar, Punjab during the Indian rebellion of 1857
- Frederic Taber Cooper (1864–1937), American editor and writer
- Frederick Cooper (actor) (1890–1945), British actor in Henry V
- Frederick Cooper (historian) (born 1947), American historian and professor of history at New York University
- Frederick Charles Cooper (between 1810 and 1821 – between 1880 and 1883), British artist, traveler and anthropologist
- Fred Cooper (sport shooter) (1910–?), British Olympic sport shooter
- Fred Cooper (boat designer), powerboat designer, early of the British Power Boat Company

== See also ==
- RNLB Freddie Cooper, a lifeboat
- Cooper (surname)
