= Bob Preedy =

Robert "Bob" Preedy is a broadcaster, a book author and was formerly a presenter on BBC Radio York and the chief continuity announcer for Yorkshire Television.

== Career ==
=== Television ===
After joining the BBC in London as a trainee cameraman in 1970, he later transferred to Yorkshire Television in Leeds. Here he also worked as a programme researcher and promotions producer. He was then asked to join the likes of Redvers Kyle, John Crosse and Graham Roberts as a continuity announcer in 1986. His duties were later expanded in 1996 when transmission for Tyne Tees Television was decamped to Leeds in 1996, followed by Granada Television in 1998 and Border Television circa 1999. Preedy was the last voice to make regional announcements for the Yorkshire, Granada, Tyne Tees and Border areas of ITV1 on 28 October 2002.

=== Radio ===
Bob Preedy formerly broadcast on BBC Radio London, Radio Tees, Pennine Radio, Radio Hallam and Radio Aire. He left Radio Aire in 1990 after creating the name of its new sister station, Magic 828 and returned a few years later to present a weekend show for Magic 828.

He presented country music programmes on BBC Radio York from the late 1980s until 2008, including, from 1991, Hot Country which was also aired on seven of the BBC Local Radio stations as part of the BBC Night Network in the North of England.

He was until July 2009, the head of Wetherby's Community Radio station Tempo FM, which began broadcasting in September 2006. Now living on Kent's south coast, his radio output includes shows & features on BBC Radio York, UKCountryRadio.com, Offshore Music Radio, and local Folkestone station, Academy FM. In March 2020 he started a new station in Kent - Shoreline FM 100.2, broadcasting across 100 square miles of Romney Marsh & Hythe.

=== Writing ===
Preedy has written 27 books including "Batley Variety Club", "Wetherby Revisited", "Radio 270: Life On The Ocean Waves", "Radio Caroline North: Rockin' and Rollin'" and "Johnnie Walker: Cruisin' The Formats". He has recently completed a book about Battersea Fun Fair - inspired by his work in 2010 on the Dreamland, Margate project.

Other various books include about cinemas and theatres across the Yorkshire region

=== Enterprise ===
Preedy was long time owner (1992 - 2008) of the Wetherby Film Theatre in Wetherby, West Yorkshire; having refurbished the old bingo hall. Prior to this he ran the Castle Cinema, Pickering, from 1984 to 1991.
