= Wetherby's Cinema =

Cinema in Wetherby, Leeds, England

Coordinates: 53.929947°N 1.390278°W

Wetherby Film Theatre
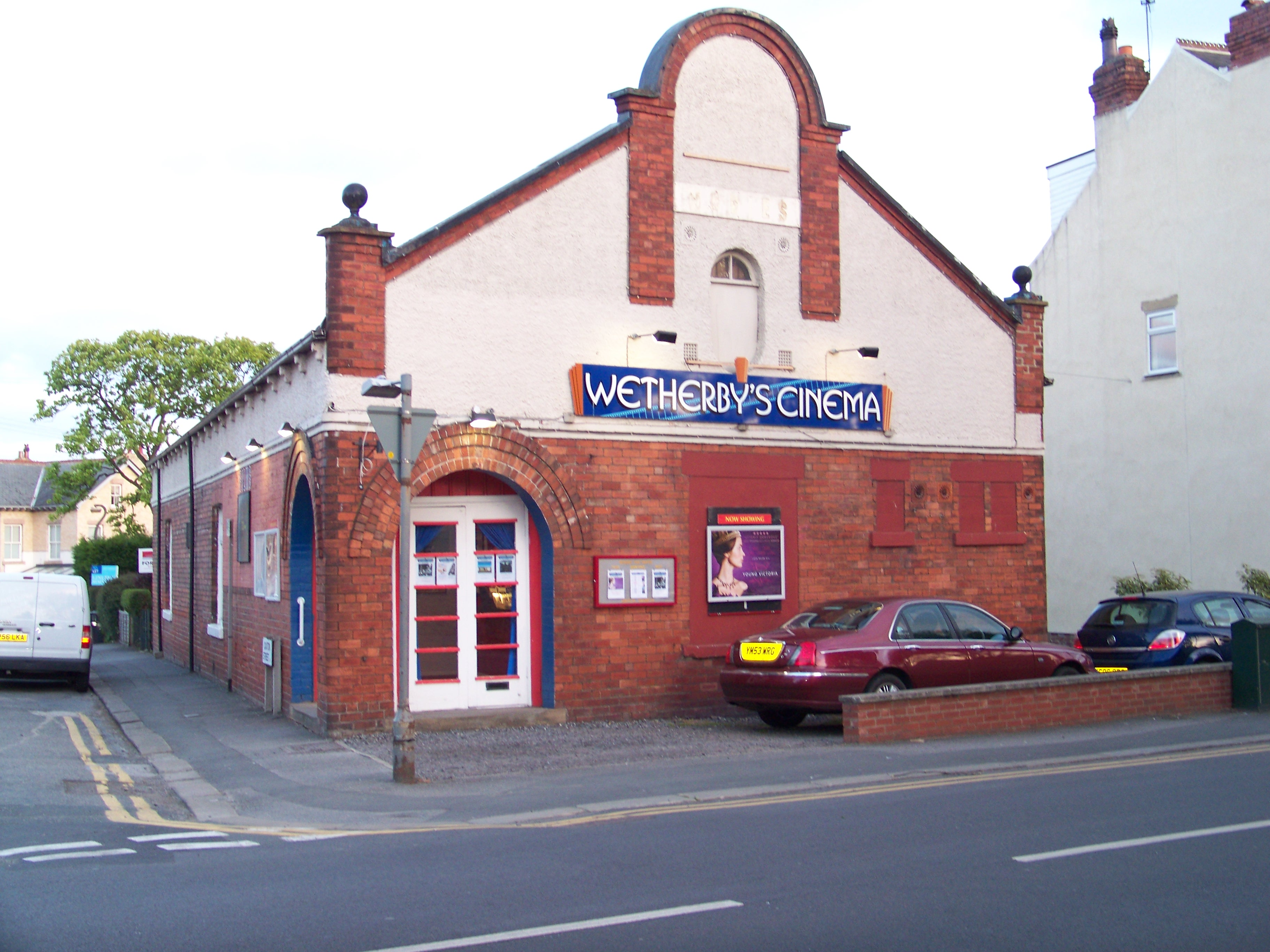
- Wetherby's Cinema
- Founded: April 1915; 111 years ago
- Headquarters: Crossley Street, Wetherby, West Yorkshire, England, United Kingdom
- Website: www.wetherbycinema.com

Wetherby's Cinema, officially the Wetherby Film Theatre and formerly the Rodney Bingo Hall, Rodney Cinema and the Raby Picture House, is a cinema in Wetherby, West Yorkshire, England. It originally opened in April 1915 as "Raby Picture House".

== History ==
In 1865, the site on Caxton Street was acquired by a consortium, headed by local entrepreneur Henry Crossley for £2000. In 1914, his son, George, started work redeveloping the residential cottages as a cinema, which was completed in 1915. Crossley sold the cinema that year to Raby Picture House Ltd, a Leeds based cinema operating company.

The cinema then had a capacity of 260, which has since been reduced to 136.

At the time of the cinema's opening, Wetherby lacked mains electricity and so a 400 volt gas-powered generator provided power. That and the flammable nitrate film then in use meant that the projection room required steel shutters to contain any potential fire. They still remain today,

The cinema was named the Raby Picture House, opposite Raby Park, but the year it was opened, it was requisitioned for the billeting of soldiers going to the First World War.

In 1944, Raby Picture Houses was acquired by Harrogate-based Star Cinemas, which renamed it the Rodney Cinema, after one of the directors' son. Popular local rumour that it was named after HMS Rodney is incorrect.

In October 1955, Peter Osborn became the manager of the Rodney Cinema, and 'Uncle Peter' ran the successful matinee club for children on Saturday afternoons. He doubled as a bingo caller. The matinee club also had a mascot in the form of Roddy, a former stray dog. Peter stayed at the cinema until October 1963.

In 1964, the cinema closed. The rise of television viewing meant many other cinemas have the same fate. Wetherby Rural District Council considered acquiring and operating the cinema but, after surveying the building, decided against it.

In 1965, the building found a new use, opening as the Rodney Bingo and Social Club after the premises were acquired by Harecroft Estates Ltd. The bingo hall continued to operate until it closed in 1993.

The building reopened as a cinema in 1994 after it was acquired by local businessman and broadcaster Bob Preedy. It now became known as Wetherby Film Theatre.

The business was acquired by local residents Ray and Irene Trewhitt in 2007, and the building has subsequently undergone considerable refurbishment. It lost its distinctive chimneys along its apex.

Inside, a continuous programme of modernisation moved the box office to the opposite side of the lobby, and there is now a larger selection of confectionery. A licensed bar was added in 2012 inside the auditorium. The projection system has been upgraded to digital, but a reel-to-reel projector still remains to enable the cinema to show older films. Also, the sound system has been upgraded to Dolby 7.1 in 2014.

== Proposed extension and twinning ==
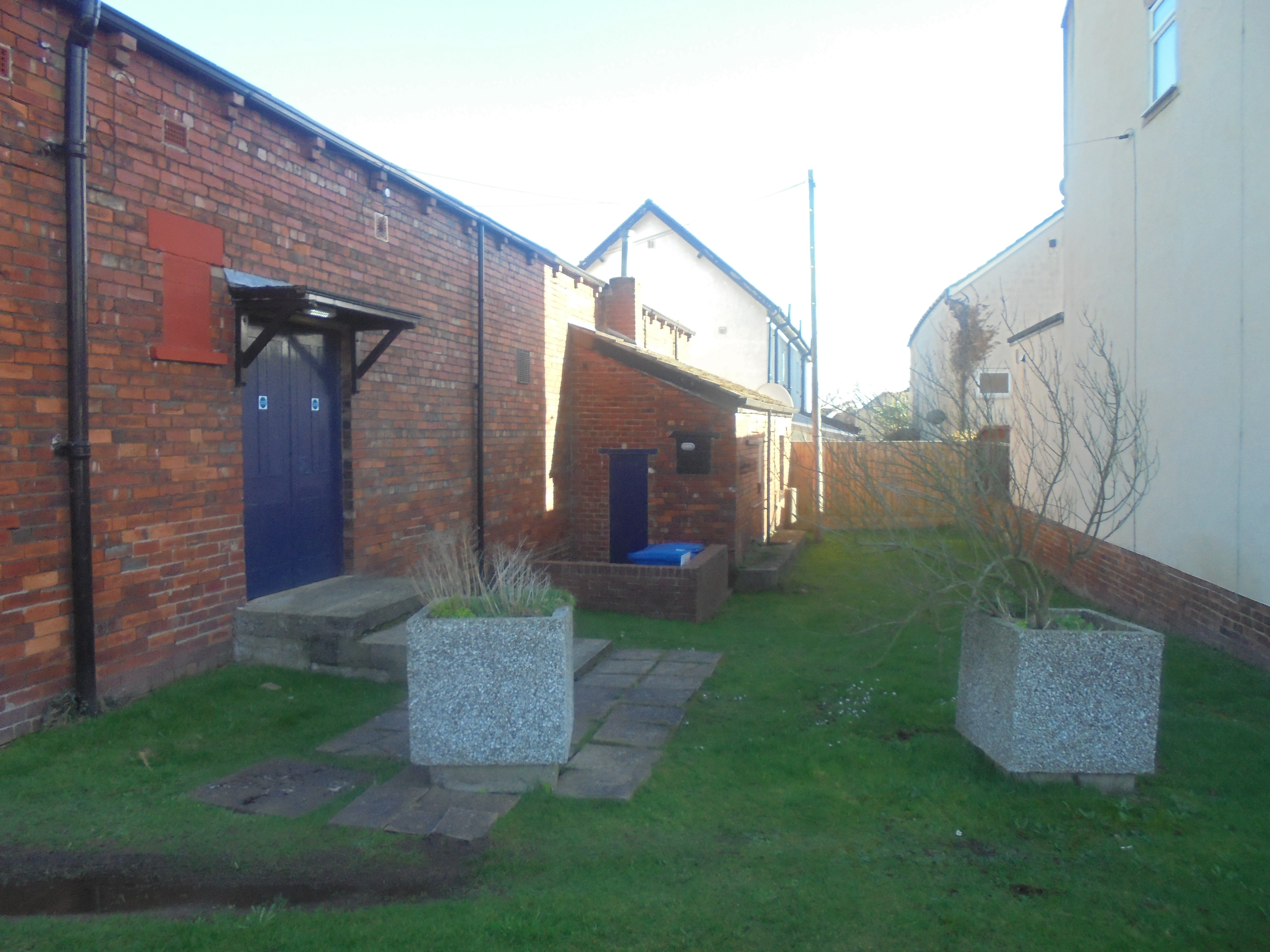
The proposed extension will see this vacant land built on.

In 2019 the cinema applied for planning permission to expand the cinema to split the existing large screen into two smaller screens and to build an adjoining bar. This would see an extension being built on the west side of the cinema on land currently unused.
