= Tempo FM =

Coordinates: 53°55′48″N 1°23′24″W

- England
- Frequencies: FM: 107.4 MHz; DAB: 8B

Programming
- Format: Easy Listening

Ownership
- Owner: Wetherby Community Radio Ltd

History
- First air date: 11 September 2006

Links
- Webcast: Live MP3 Stream
- Website: Tempo FM 107.4

Tempo FM is the local community radio station for Wetherby, Boston Spa and the surrounding villages in the West Yorkshire and North Yorkshire areas. The radio station mainly plays easy listening music and is run entirely by volunteers as a "Not for Profit" company.

== Background ==
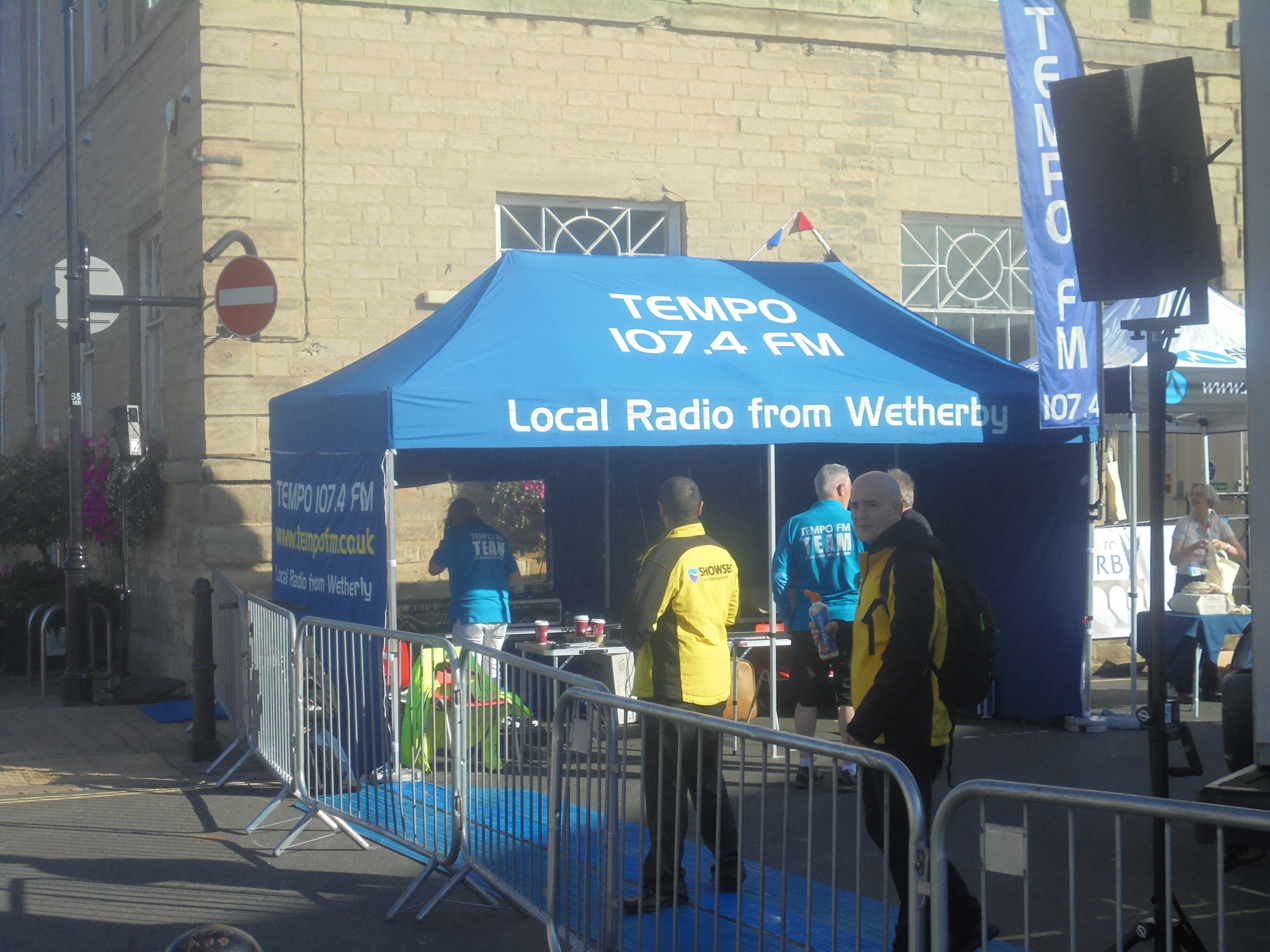
Tempo FM shelter in the Market Place in Wetherby during the 2019 UCI Road World Championships on 21 September 2019.

The radio station was the idea of Bob Preedy who applied for the licence. With the help of a team of volunteers, it commenced broadcasting on 107.4 MHz on 11 September 2006 in Wetherby, West Yorkshire. The station plays easy listening music, during the day with specialist live and recorded programmes during the evenings. A wide range of music is played during the evenings, weekends and Bank Holidays presented by many local presenters. The radio station is funded partly by advertising, supplemented by donations and grants. The current Programme Controller is Steve France, who is also a member of the management team comprising:- Alan Everard, Eric Ovenden, Jon Beeson, Simon Suter and Mike Davison.

In November 2011, Tempo FM presenter Wayne Bavin set a record by presenting a 60-hour-long radio show, raising some £1800 for "Children in Need" and beating the record set by Chris Moyles of Radio 1 by several hours. Similar broadcasting attempts have been made and all are subject to final confirmation by Guinness World Records.

The current licence period for Tempo FM expires on 10 September 2036.

== Broadcast Area ==
The station was originally based at the Engine Shed, Wetherby. In October 2012 it moved to new purpose built studios in the One Stop Centre in Westgate, Wetherby. At the same time it moved its transmitter to higher ground overlooking Collingham. It covers Wetherby, Boston Spa, Collingham, Tadcaster, and Harewood, the station can also be heard in many places in the neighbouring county of North Yorkshire. In January 2026 the station was forced to move its transmitter back to the centre of Wetherby, due to development of the original site. The station also 'streams' online around the world. In June of 2025 it was awarded an Ofcom licence to provide a small scale DAB multiplex service covering Wetherby. Tempo FM was launched on this DAB multiplex on the 14th February 2026.

== Presenters ==
- Rob Allen
- Andy Andrews
- John Appleson
- Norah Barnes
- Jon Bee
- Nick Brown
- Mike Davison
- Ben Dickinson
- Ray Drake
- Rebecca Few
- Steve France
- Jools Greenwood
- Tony Haynes
- Bruce Howard
- Pete Issatt
- Emily Kerr
- John Leetch
- Andy Lister
- John Marley
- Harry Meaden
- Stuart Newcombe
- Eric Ovenden
- Steve Pexton
- Kevin Rouse
- Simon Suter
- Pete Willett
- Paul Winn
- Guest features by: Wetherby U3A Creative Writing Group, Wetherby High School – Radio Academy

== Slogans ==
- Your easy connection to Wetherby and Boston Spa (2006–2008)
- Easy listening radio from Wetherby (2008–2009)
- Your Radio out of Wetherby (2009–2010)
- Wetherby's Brighter Radio Station (2010–2011)
- Good Times...Great Songs from the Heart of Yorkshire (2011–October 2014)
- Good Times...Great Songs (October 2014–present)
