= Fred Cooper (cricketer, born 1888) =

English cricketer

Cricket information
- Bowling: Right-arm medium

Career statistics
Competition	First-class
Matches	10
Runs scored	170
Batting average	10.00
100s/50s	0/1
Top score	52
Balls bowled	658
Wickets	8
Bowling average	48.12
5 wickets in innings	1
10 wickets in match	0
Best bowling	5/71
Catches/stumpings	3/–
- Source: Cricinfo, 8 November 2022

Frederick Joseph Cooper (16 March 1888 – 27 June 1958) was an English cricketer who played ten first-class matches for Essex between 1921 and 1923.

Although mostly not an effective batsman — he was dismissed for single-figure scores in 14 of his 18 innings — Cooper made 32 on debut against Kent, then hit 52 from number nine against Gloucestershire in his second match. He also hit 32 (again) against Somerset the following year. (The remaining innings of his career was also single-digit, but not out.)

His bowling was similarly rarely decisive, but he did manage to take five of his eight career wickets in one innings when he claimed 5–71 against the Combined Services in 1922.

Cooper was born in Wetherby, Yorkshire, and died at the age of 70 in York.
