= Frederick Charles Cooper =

British artist

- Born: Between 1810 and 1821; Nottingham, England, British Empire
- Died: Between 1880 and 1883; London, England, British Empire
- Education: Royal Academy of Arts
- Known for: Painting, drawing
- Style: Portrait, still life, genre
- Movement: Realism, mysticism

Frederick Charles Cooper (between 1810 and 1821, Nottingham, England – between 1880 and 1883, London). was a British artist, traveler and anthropologist of the Victorian era. Cooper accompanied Sir Austen Henry Layard on his expedition to the territory of ancient Assyria in 1849–1850. During this trip, he created a series of detailed watercolours and sketches that captured the ruins and artifacts of Nineveh, the surrounding landscapes of northern Iraq and Syria, as well as anthropological observations and portraits of the artist's contemporaries and expedition participants.

Cooper was also an honorary Consul to Queen Victoria in Mesopotamia and Kurdistan (1850–1855).

== Early life and artistic beginnings ==
Frederick Charles Cooper was born in Nottingham. At the age of about 25, he moved to London with hopes of establishing himself as an artist. In 1844, while already residing permanently in the capital of England, at 37 Dorset Square, he reached the first important milestone in his career by exhibiting the work Ophelia: therewith fantastic garlands did she make at the Royal Academy's annual exhibition.

== The Assyrian expedition ==
In 1849, Cooper was selected as the official artist for an historically ambitious expedition led by Austen Henry Layard, an archaeologist and diplomat. The expedition set out for areas that are now in northern Iraq and Syria, with the aim of excavating Nineveh - the ancient capital of Assyria, famous for its architecture and associations with biblical and other religious texts.

The Trustees of the British Museum, recognizing the importance of visually documenting these archaeological wonders, decided to appoint Cooper as the official illustrator of the expedition. His task was to meticulously sketch and paint in watercolour the artefacts, structures, and landscapes that were being uncovered and discovered during the research. Layard himself acknowledged Cooper's role, writing in his 1853 book Discoveries among the Ruins of Nineveh and Babylon that the "assistance of a competent artist was most desirable, to portray with fidelity those monuments which injury and decay had rendered unfit for removal." Cooper's artistic ability became crucial in preserving a visual record of the discoveries, particularly given the fragile and deteriorating state of many of the relics.

Sources claim an uneasy relationship between Cooper and Layard, and personal dislike that Layard had for Cooper. John Curtis, the Keeper of the Middle East Department at the British Museum (1989–2011), wrote:

From the start, it was clear that Layard was fairly contemptuous of Cooper and had little time for him. Cooper was very homesick, missed his wife, and even painted a portrait of her from memory which he took out from to time to gaze at. He didn't like the food, and suffered from the climate as it started to get hotter.

The expedition to Nineveh culminated in one of the most important archaeological discoveries of the 19th century—the excavation of the palace of Sennacherib. Among Cooper's numerous works as the expedition's artist were depictions of Assyrian reliefs and monumental sculptures, including an image of the famous winged bulls guarding the entrance to the palace; a work depicting two lions at the entrance to the sanctuary of Ninurta; Nimrud. One particularly impressive image shows a giant figure being carefully lowered onto a wooden cart using ropes - a scene that conveys the scale and drama of the research.

More than fifty of Cooper's original drawings from this expedition are now part of the British Museum's collection.

== Return to London and exhibitions ==
Upon his return to London in 1851, Cooper presented the public a visual report of the journey of 37 paintings arranged as a diorama at Gothic Hall on Lower Grosvenor Street. The diorama was a sensation, immersing viewers in the world of ancient Assyria and transporting them to the very sites of Layard's discoveries. This exhibition placed Cooper at the center of Victorian England's fascination with the ancient Near East and its connections to the mysticism.

Cooper continued to exhibit at the Royal Academy, where he showed works that highlighted his experiences in Mesopotamia. His 1852 painting Scene from the Excavations of Nineveh was drawn directly from his on-site sketches, as was his 1860 work The Plains of Nineveh from the Tanner's Ferry near Mosul.

The art historian H.L. Mallalieu wrote in his Dictionary of British Watercolour Artists up to 1920: "Cooper's landscapes are effective, but his figures can be rather shaky..."

Despite his success, Cooper remained a somewhat elusive figure in the art world. In the 1860s, one of the artist's best works, "The Girl and the Alchemist" (1860), was presented at the Royal Academy, in which his traditional realism is replaced by mysticism, which by that time had become an integral part of Victorian England's culture. He exhibited his final piece, The Souvenir, at the Royal Academy in 1868, marking the slow end of his public artistic career.

== Later years and death ==
Cooper's later life is basically unknown. Information about him after 1870 is almost entirely absent from available sources. He is believed to have died around 1880.

In addition to the British Museum, the artist's works are also featured in several galleries and private collections

== Gallery ==
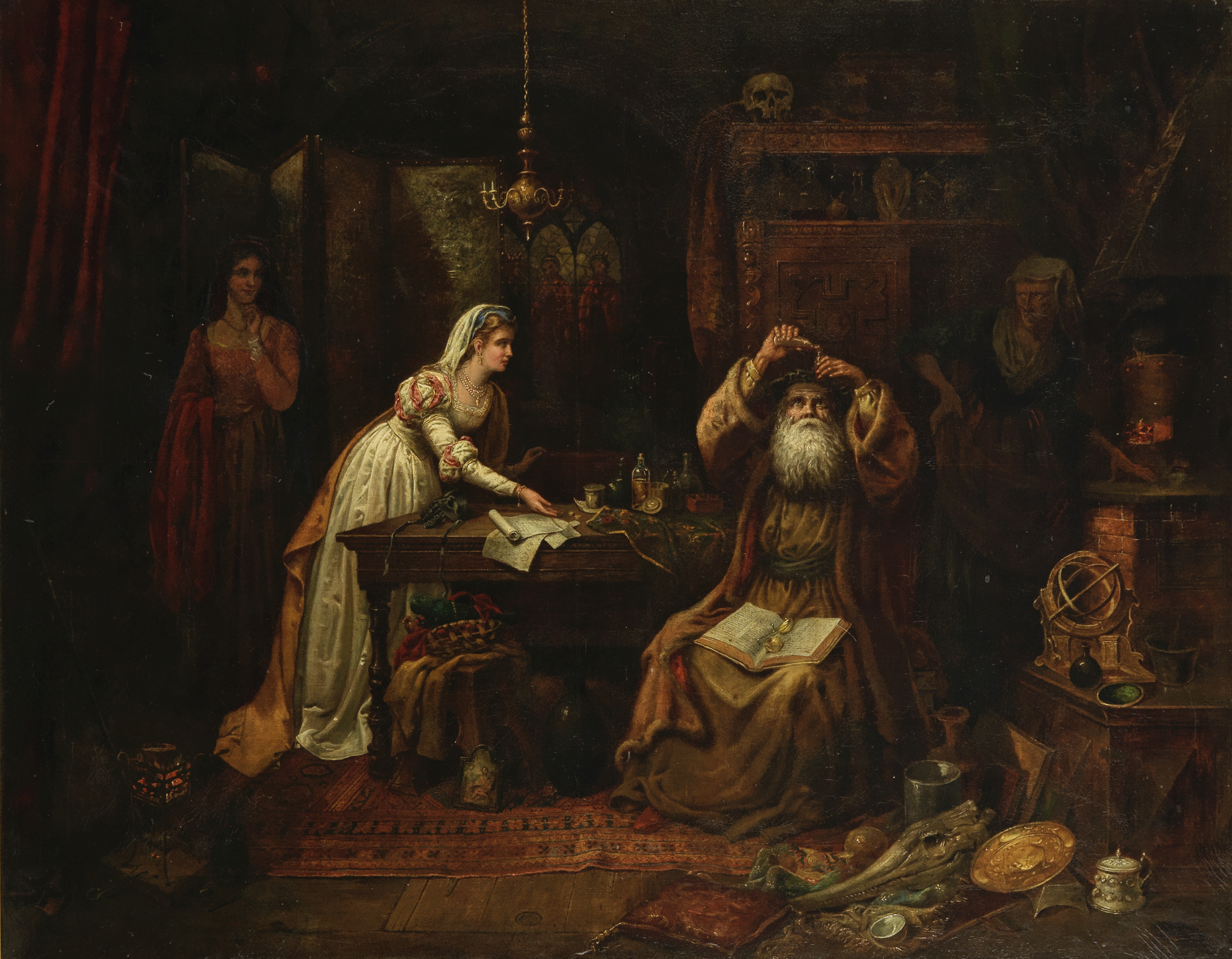
The maiden and the alchemist (c.1860). Oil on canvas 86.8 × 110.5 cm (34 3/16 × 43 1/2in). Private collection.

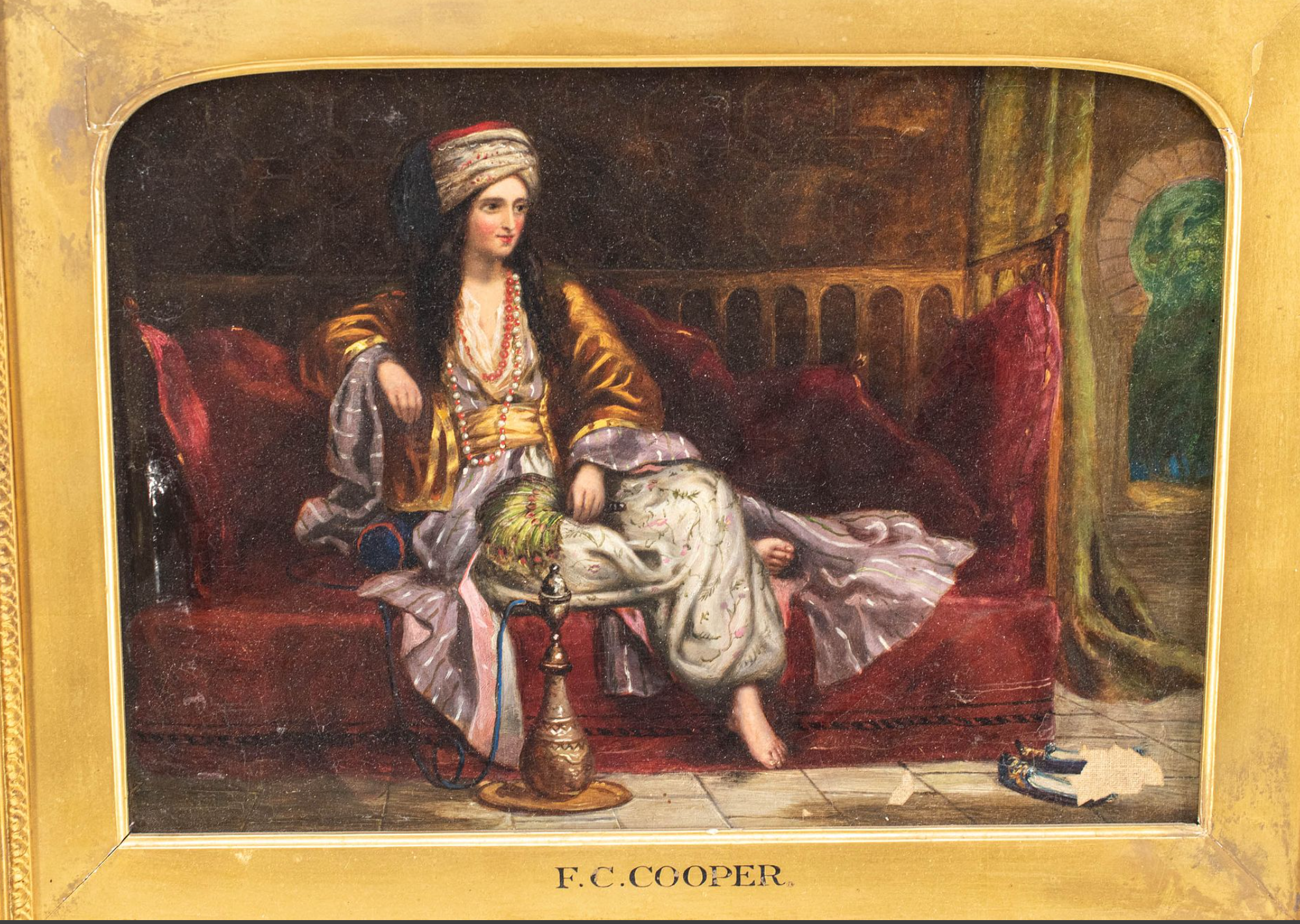
A woman lounging with a hookah (c. 1860s). Oil on canvas 16 1/4 in × 20 1/4 in. Private collection

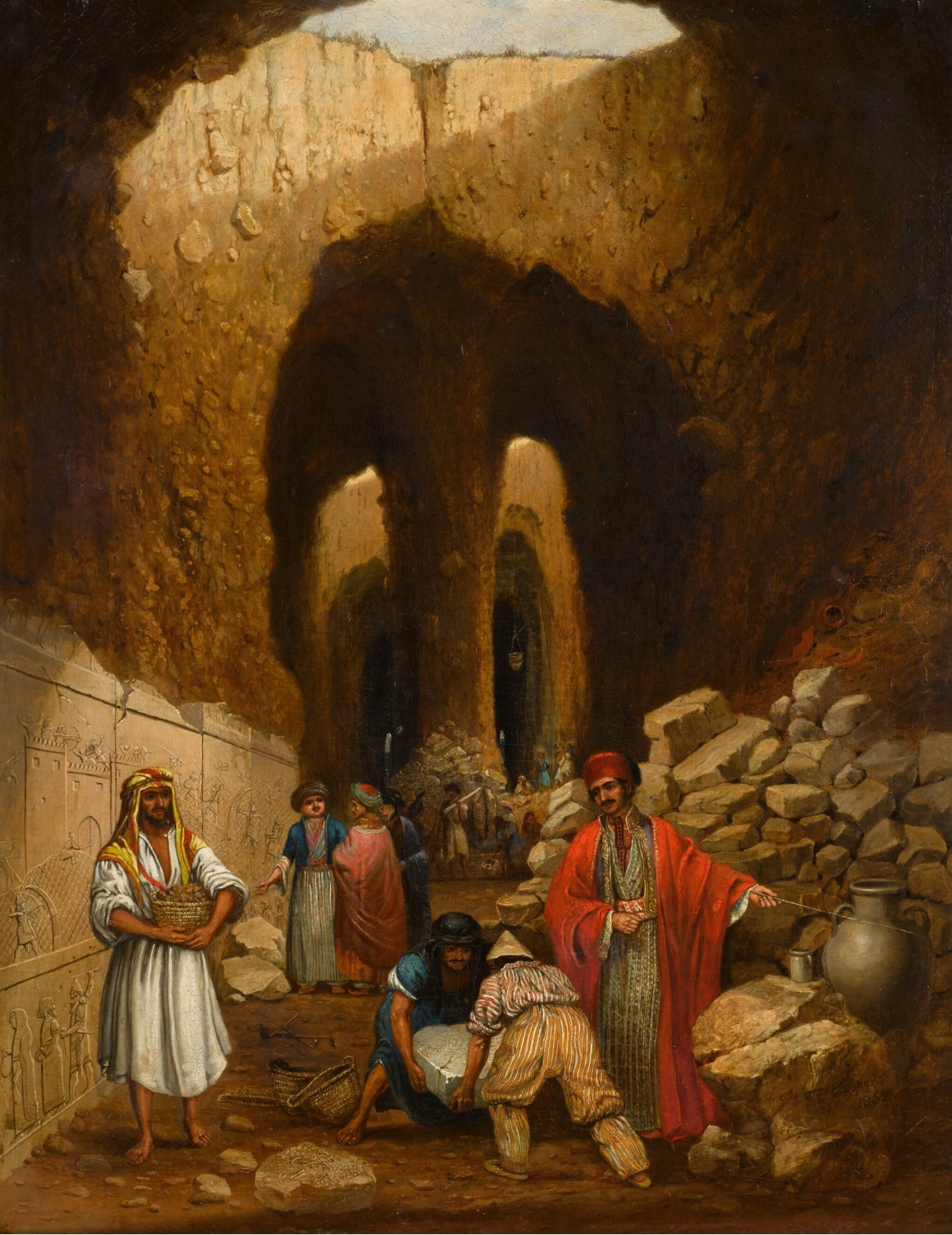
Excavation of the City of Nineveh (c. 1852). Oil on canvas. Unframed: 91.5 × 71.5 cm, 36 × 28in. Framed: 125 × 106 cm., 49¼ × 41¾in. Private collection.

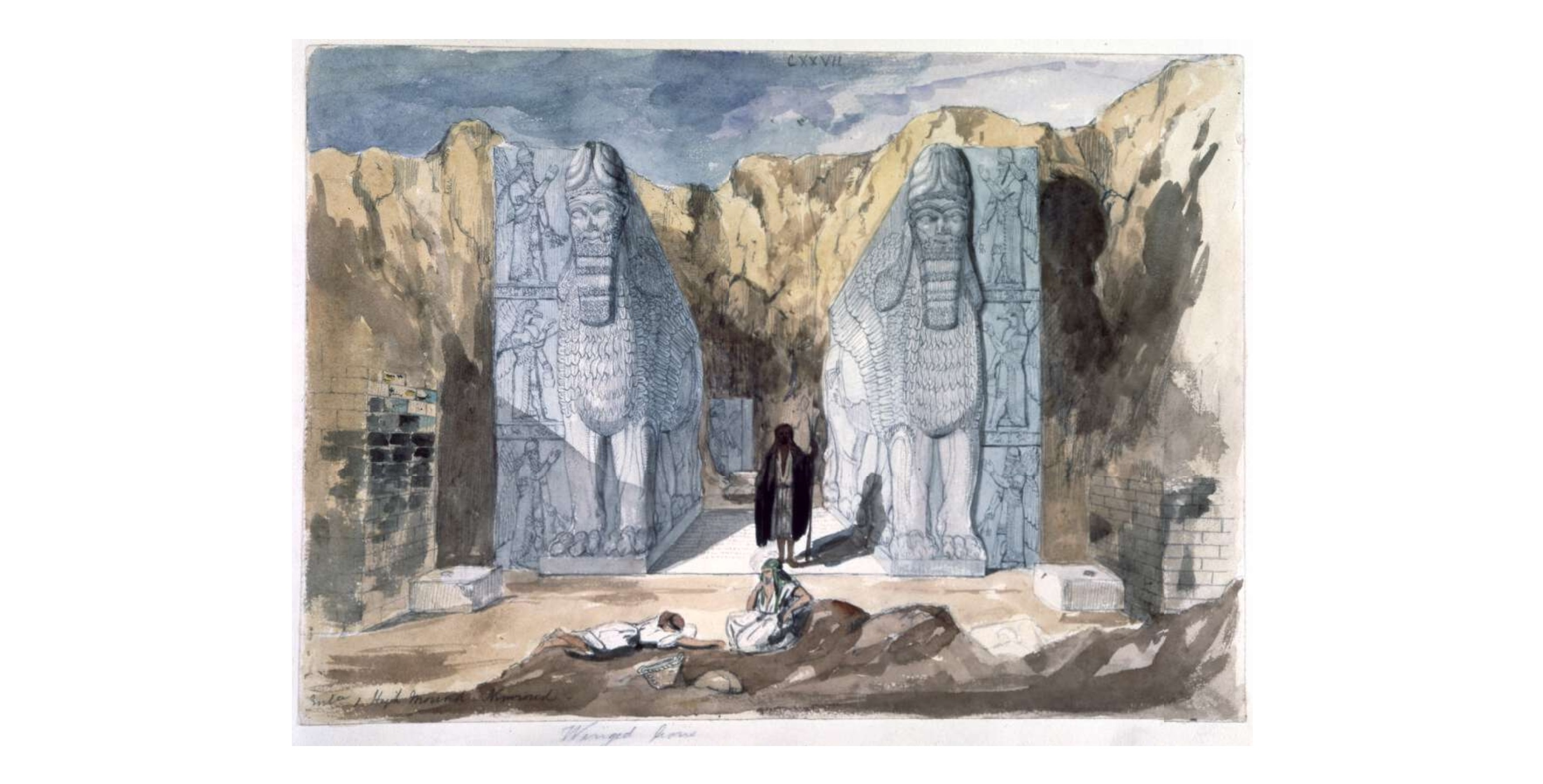
From a bound set of original drawings made at the time of the nineteenth-century discoveries in Assyria. Many of these drawings were used by Layard in his publications of the 1840s and 1850s. British Museum.
