= Wetherby =

Town and civil parish in West Yorkshire, England

Coordinates: 53.9276°N 1.3839°W

- Town
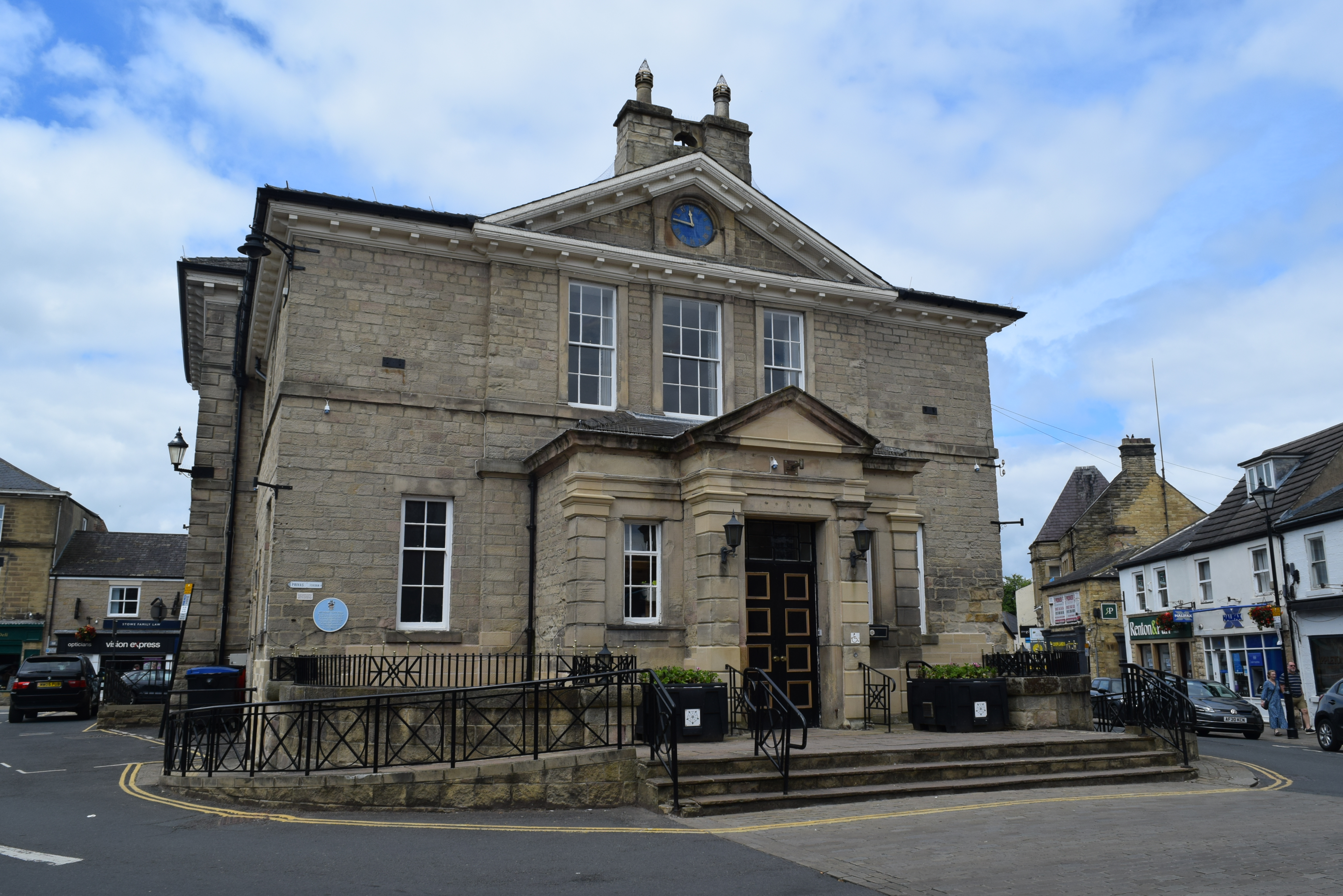
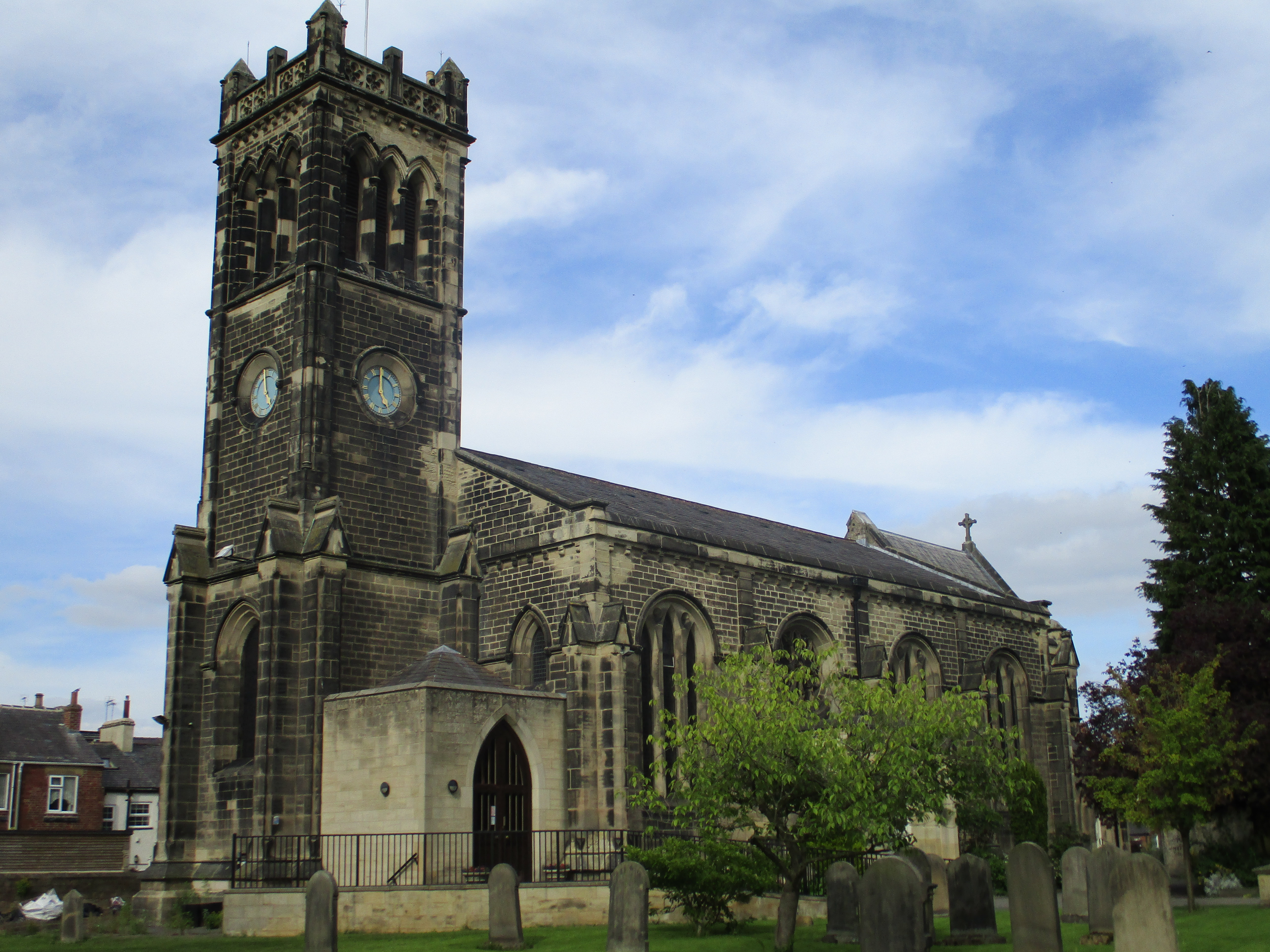
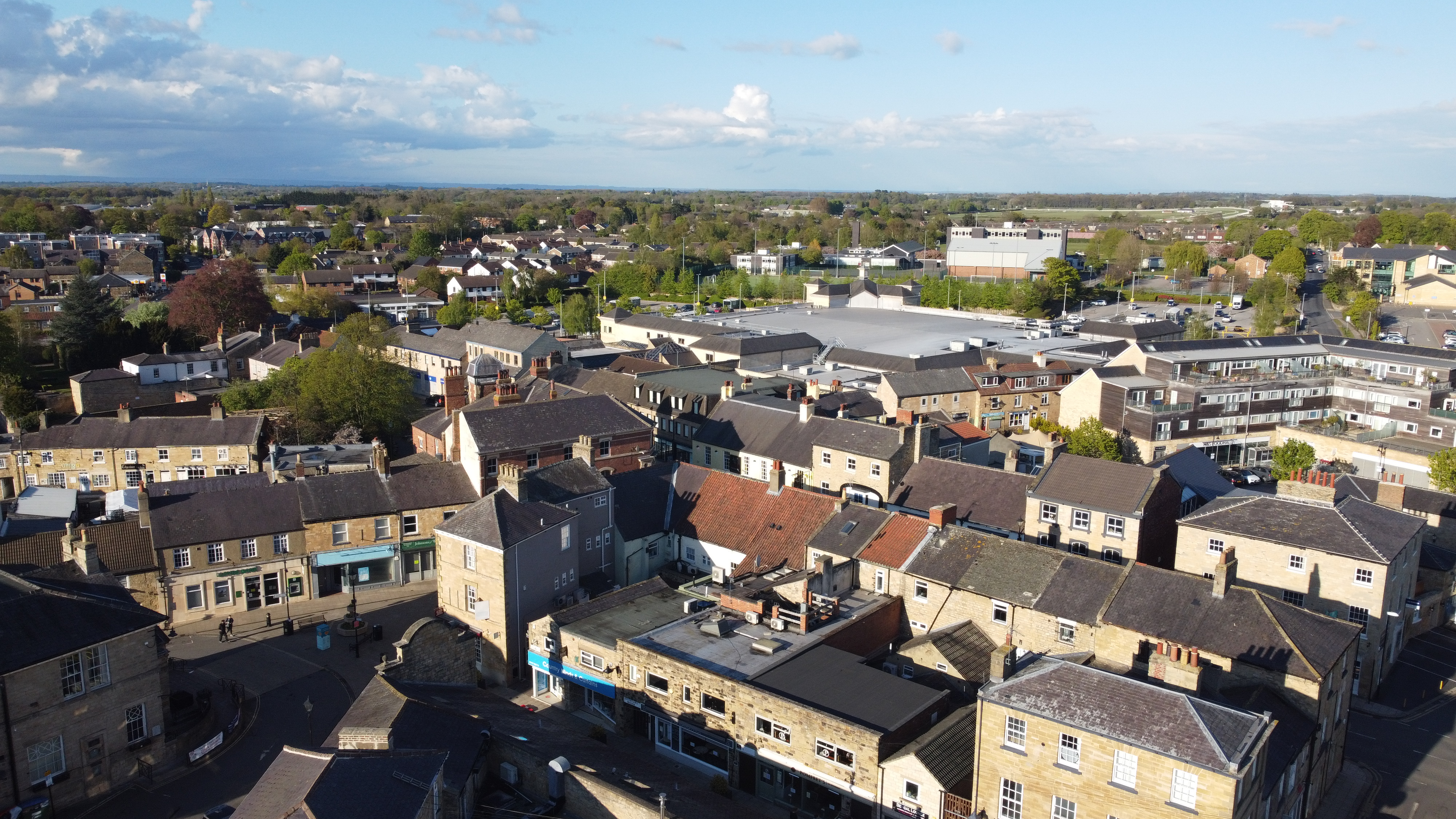
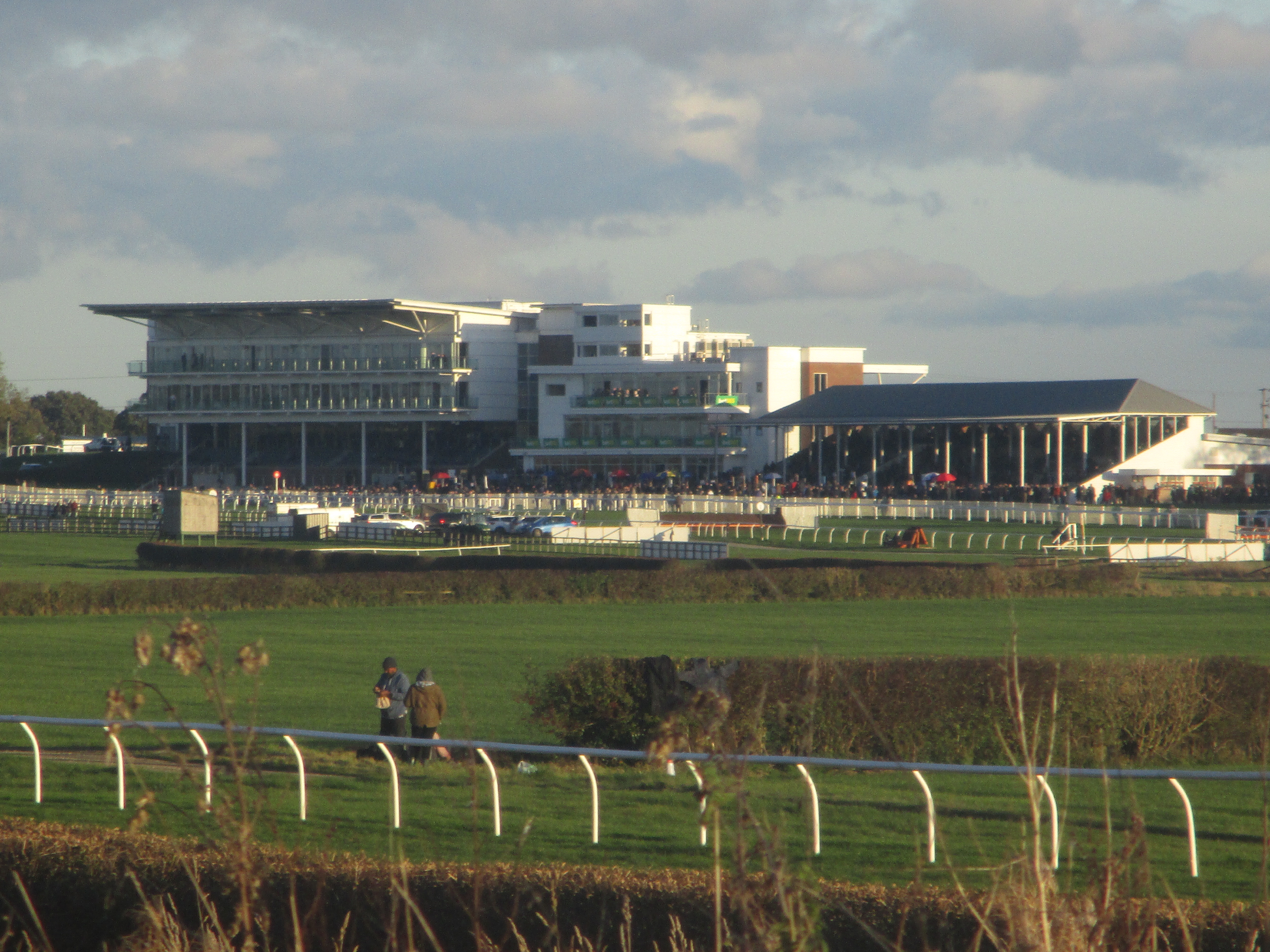
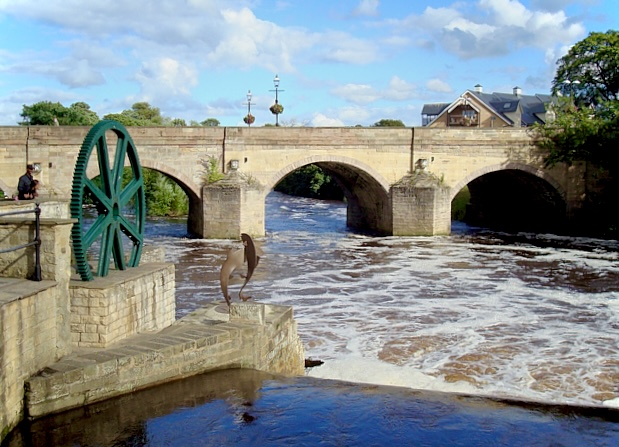
- The Town Hall St James' Church Aerial View of Central Wetherby The Racecourse The Bridge

- Location within City of Leeds Location within West Yorkshire
- Area: 3.87 sq mi (10.0 km^{2})
- Population: 11,712 (2021)
  - Density: 3,026/sq mi (1,168/km^{2})
- OS grid reference: SE404481
- Civil parish: Wetherby
- Metropolitan borough: City of Leeds
- Metropolitan county: West Yorkshire
- Region: Yorkshire and the Humber
- Country: England
- Sovereign state: United Kingdom
- Post town: WETHERBY
- Postcode district: LS22, LS23
- Dialling code: 01937
- Police: West Yorkshire
- Fire: West Yorkshire
- Ambulance: Yorkshire
- UK Parliament: Wetherby and Easingwold
- Website: www.wetherby.co.uk

Wetherby (/ˈwɛðəbi/ WETH-ə-bee) is a market town and civil parish in the City of Leeds, West Yorkshire, England. It is close to West Yorkshire county's border with North Yorkshire and lies approximately 12 miles (19 kilometres) from Leeds city centre, 12 mi (19 km) from York and 8 mi (13 km) from Harrogate. The town stands on the River Wharfe and, for centuries, it has been a crossing place and staging post on the Great North Road midway between London and Edinburgh.

Wetherby Bridge, which spans the River Wharfe, is a Scheduled Ancient Monument and a Grade II listed structure. The course of the Old Great North Road passes through the town and, as result of its situation on the road, as well as being a major cattle droving route from Scotland to London, many coaching inns were established in Wetherby which are still used by travellers today.

The town lies in the Wetherby ward of Leeds City Council and the Wetherby and Easingwold parliamentary constituency. It was listed in the 2018 Sunday Times report on the Best Places to Live in Northern England.

== Toponymy ==
Wetherby is first attested in the Domesday Book of 1086, as Wedrebi. The name derives from the Old Norse words veðr ("wether, castrated male sheep", in its genitive singular form veðrar) and bý ("farmstead, village"). Thus the name once meant "wether's farmstead".

== History ==
Historically, Wetherby was a part of the Claro Wapentake, as part of the parish of Spofforth, within the West Riding of Yorkshire.

In the 12th and 13th centuries, the Knights Templar, and later the Knights Hospitallers, were granted land and properties in Yorkshire. The local preceptory founded in 1217 was at Ribston Park. In 1240, the Knights Templar were granted by Royal Charter of Henry III the right to hold a market in Wetherby (known then as Werreby) on Thursdays and a yearly fair was permitted lasting three days over the day of St James the Apostle.

From 1318 to 1319, the North of England suffered many raids from the Scots. After the Battle of Bannockburn, Wetherby was burned and many people were taken and killed. According to the blue plaque at the entrance to the lane, Scott Lane could be named after the Scottish raiders in 1318 or the 18th-century drovers who used Wetherby as a watering place.

In the English Civil War in 1644, before marching to Tadcaster and on to Marston Moor, the Parliamentarians spent two days in Wetherby joining forces with the Scots.

In the heyday of the coaching era, Wetherby had up to forty inns and alehouses. The first recorded mail coach arrived in Wetherby in 1786.

In 1824, William Cavendish, 6th Duke of Devonshire sold the town of Wetherby (except one house) to finance work at Chatsworth. Wetherby provides the setting for the novel Oldbury (1869) by Annie Keary.

=== 20th century ===
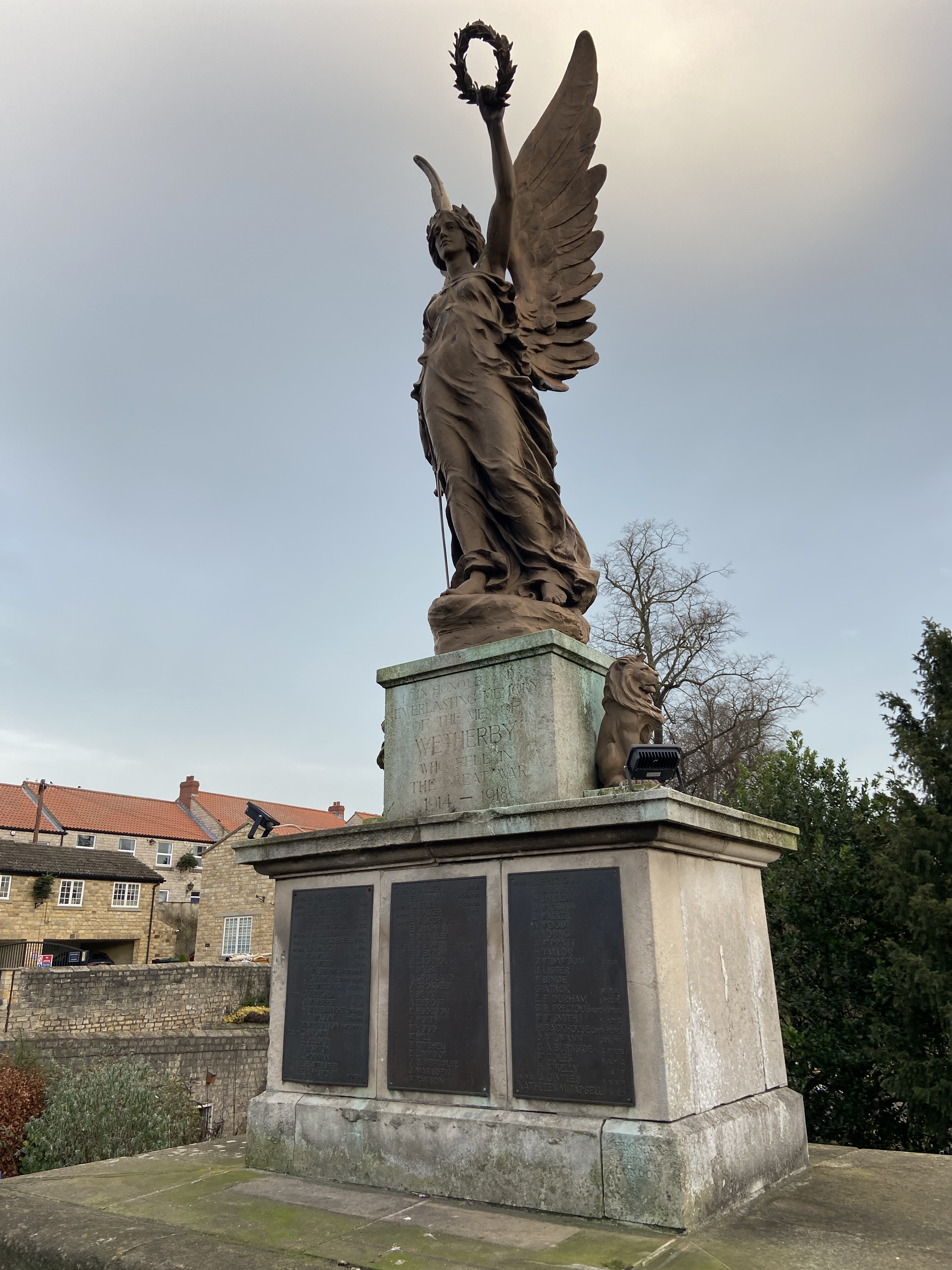
The War Memorial, situated on the bridge in Wetherby

During the First World War, many Wetherby men served with either the 5th or 9th Battalion, West Yorkshire Regiment, which had great losses in Flanders. A war memorial designed by E. F. Roslyn was dedicated on 22 April 1922.

In 1918, residents contributed to support the crew of the Racecourse-class minesweeper HMS Wetherby despite hardship and shortages caused by the war.

During the Second World War, nearby RAF Tockwith was renamed RAF Marston Moor to avoid confusion with RAF Topcliffe. Part of the airfield is now a driver training centre and the old control tower is used as the offices. Parts of the runways can still be seen. Clark Gable was stationed at Marston Moor, during the Second World War, as a member of the USAAF ground staff, with the rank of captain. He was transferred to RAF Polebrook in Northamptonshire. Adolf Hitler offered a reward to anyone who was able to catch the airman. Group Captain Leonard Cheshire was stationed at Marston Moor for a short while before leaving to become commander of the 617 Dam Buster squadron.

Wetherby had the only stone frigate north of London, built on Hallfield Lane in 1942 (it later became the local secondary school), named in turn; HMS Cabot, Demetrius, Rodney and Ceres. The base was closed in 1958 and transferred to Chatham.

Throughout the 1960s, the town council deliberated over how best to enlarge the town centre to cope with the needs of a growing population and to provide the town with a purpose built supermarket. Plans were put forward to enlarge the town over the ings, or to develop the town centre into a pedestrian precinct. In the end, it was decided to build a purpose built shopping precinct, which was built in the 1970s and underwent a significant redevelopment throughout 2003. By 2006, the remaining open parts of the Horsefair Centre were enclosed under a glass canopy roof.

== Governance ==
Wetherby Town Council
- Coat of arms

Type
- Type: Town Council

Motto
- "Imperium in Imperio" ("One government within another.")

Meeting place
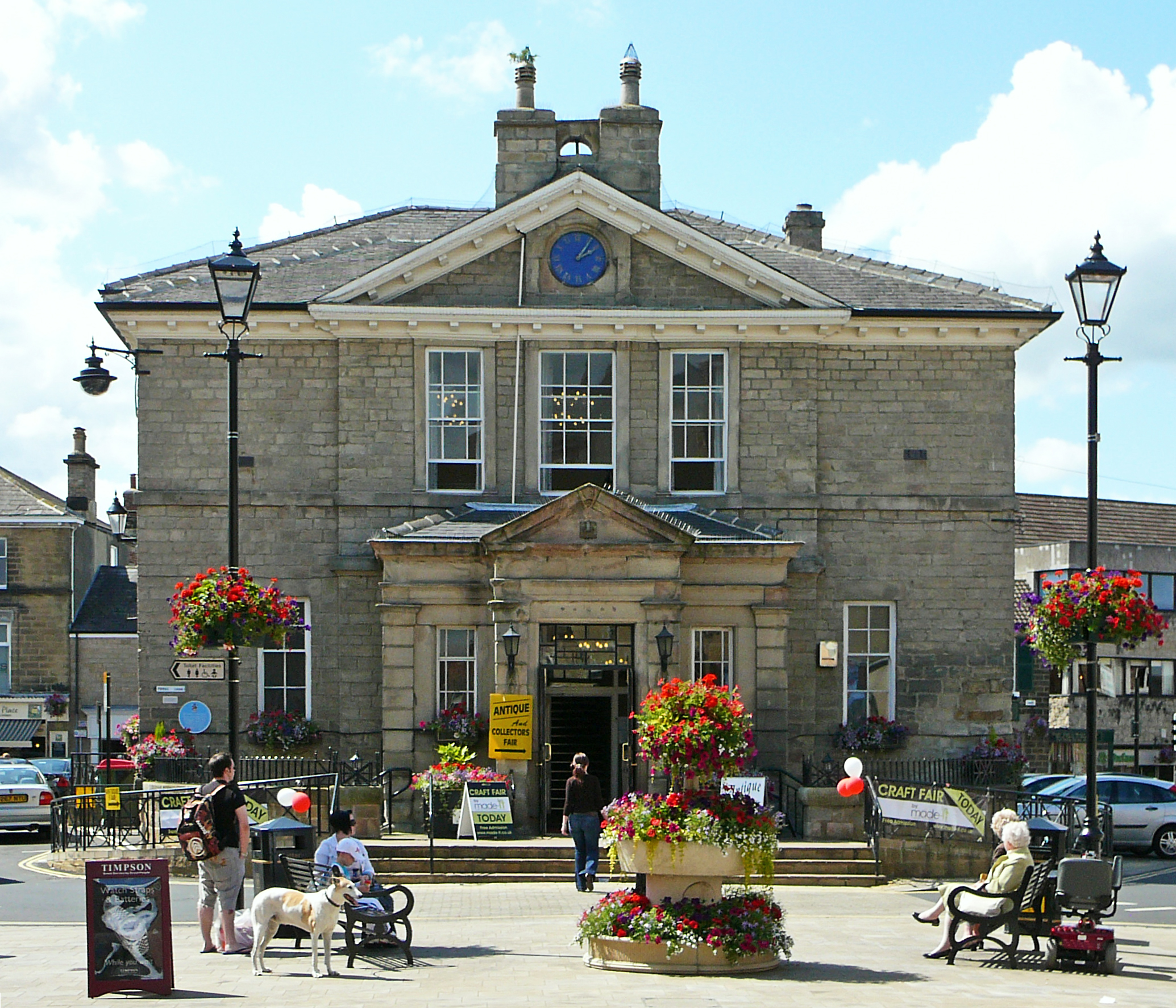
- Wetherby Town Hall

Website
- www.wetherby.co.uk

Since 2024, Wetherby has been in the Wetherby and Easingwold constituency, having previously been in the abolished Elmet and Rothwell constituency. The town's MP is Alec Shelbrooke, a Conservative, who has his constituency offices in the town. Wetherby is an electoral ward of Leeds City Council and has a town council responsible for amenities, such as parks.

The coat of arms transferred over from the former Wetherby Rural District Council; it was the first such arms to be granted by the College of Arms to a rural district council, on 7 January 1938.

=== Crime and law enforcement ===
West Yorkshire Police have a station in Boston Road.

=== Twinnings ===
- Privas, France

== Geography ==
=== Divisions and suburbs ===
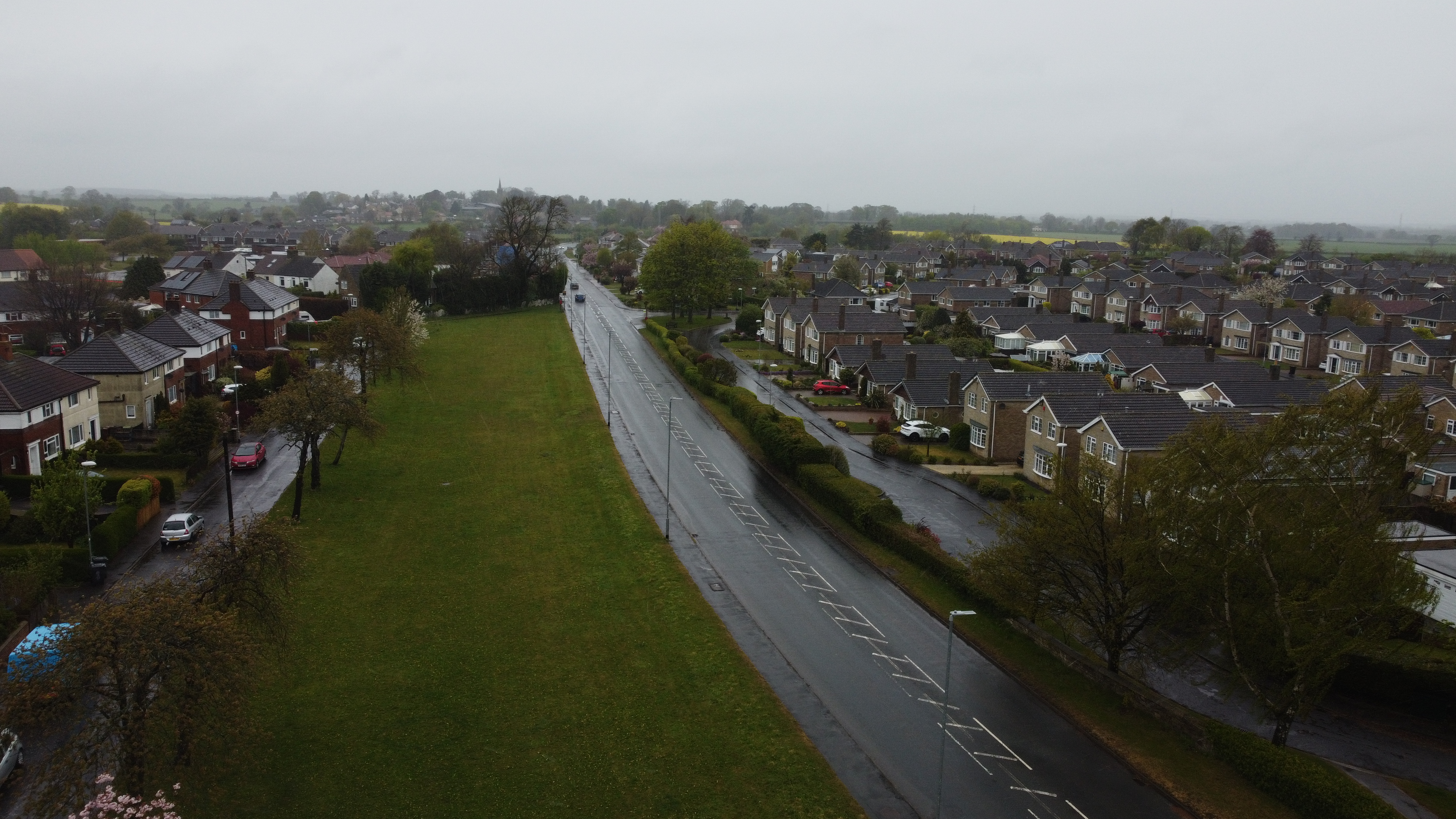
Deighton Road divides the areas of Ainsty (left) and Deighton Bar (right)

- Ainsty is in the north of Wetherby, off the B1224 Deighton Road. Its earliest buildings date from the 1940s, made up of council and private housing. Much of the area was built by developer Norman Ashton in the 1960s.
- Hallfield, in the south-east, is a large council estate and has some houses built by the prison service and some sheltered housing. The area is home to Wetherby High School, St James' Primary School, the cemetery, the Church on the Corner and Mason House Community Centre. A new medical centre has been built on the edge of the estate on the site of the demolished Hallfield Mansion.
- Micklethwaite was a village in its own right, but its identity as a separate area has disappeared since the Micklethwaite Farm's buildings were demolished in the 2000s and replaced by 150 dwellings known as Micklethwaite. It is situated south of the River Wharfe and contains the police station, magistrates court, the Mercure Hotel and the town's leisure centre and swimming baths.
- Deighton Bar is situated in the north-east, bordering Ainsty and Sandbeck and the village of Kirk Deighton in North Yorkshire, as is one street in Deighton Bar, Autumn Avenue. The oldest houses are in a row of terrace houses on Deighton Road. The area is home to Deighton Gates primary school between Ainsty and Deighton Bar. Most housing was built in the late 1970s by Barratt Developments.
- Barleyfields is a residential area of housing in central Wetherby. Its oldest houses are large Victorian terraces on Sandringham Terrace and the former quarry workers' cottages behind Prospect Villas. The area is situated in the middle of a large triangular dismantled railway junction. It is home to St Joseph's Primary School, Crossley Street Primary School and Barleyfields Community Centre.
- Sandbeck is home to the Sandbeck Industrial Estate, some 1960s Norman Ashton houses and some 1970s council houses.
- Linton Park View is an affluent area of private houses, mostly built in the 1970s between Spofforth Hill and Linton Lane in the north-west of Wetherby.
- Spofforth Hill, named after the road that passes through it, is an affluent area off the A661. It contains many large detached houses from Victorian times onwards. In the 1980s and 1990s, the area was expanded after Shepherd Homes built a housing estate on former agricultural land called the Glebe Field Estate.

=== Weather and climate ===
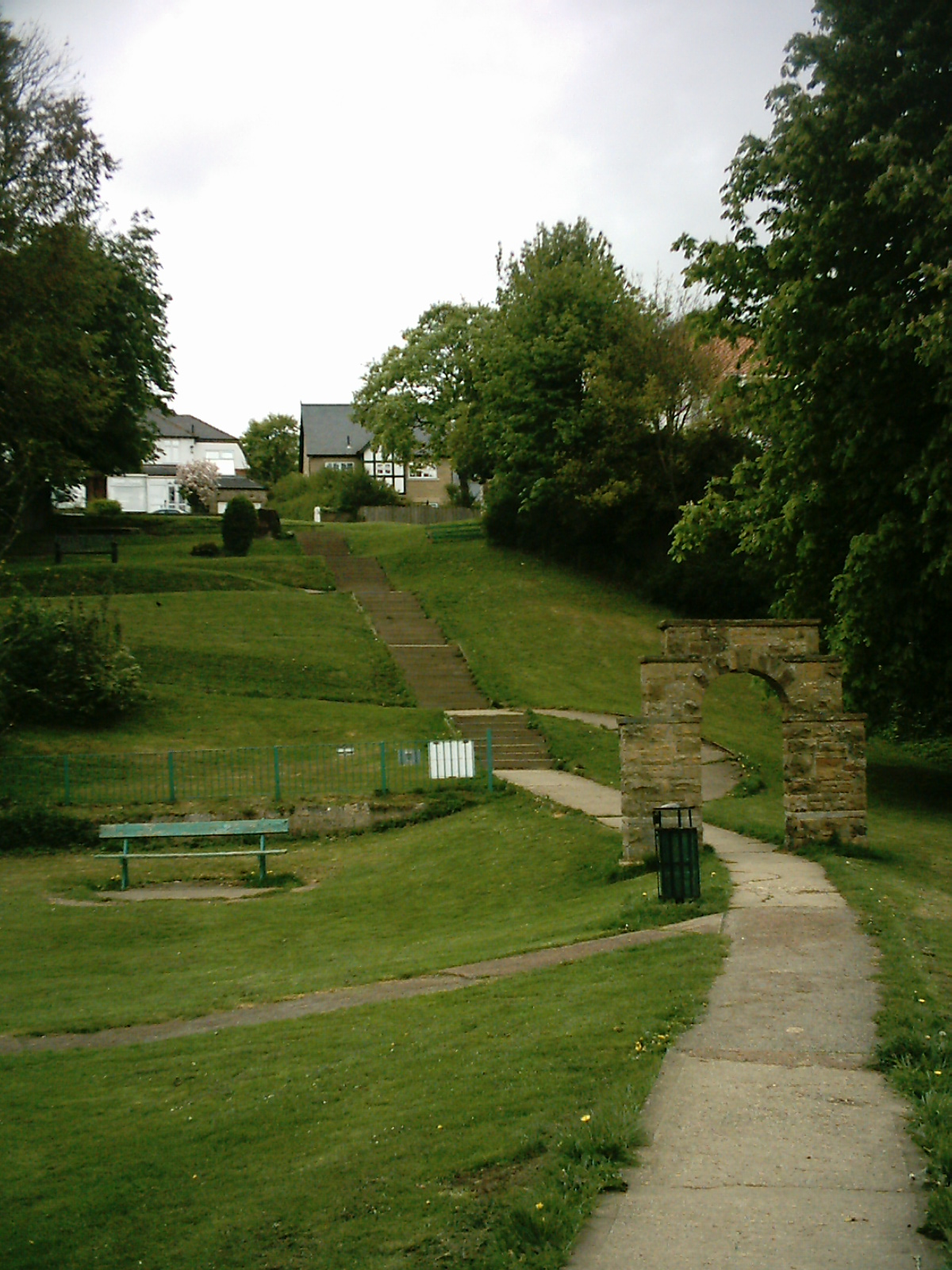
King George's Field, Wetherby Ings

Wetherby has a cool, fairly moist climate with changeable weather year-round. Liquid equivalent precipitation totals about 630mm per year and is fairly well distributed through the seasons.

Cloudy weather tends to predominate, but settled, sunny spells occur at times.

Winter temperatures average just above freezing for lows, with highs about 5–9 °C.

Frost and snow are not uncommon, but are rarely severe or prolonged. Temperatures very rarely drop as low as −10 °C.

Summers are mild, with lows generally 10–15 °C and highs of 15–25 °C, with a few hot days approaching 30 °C.

== Demography ==
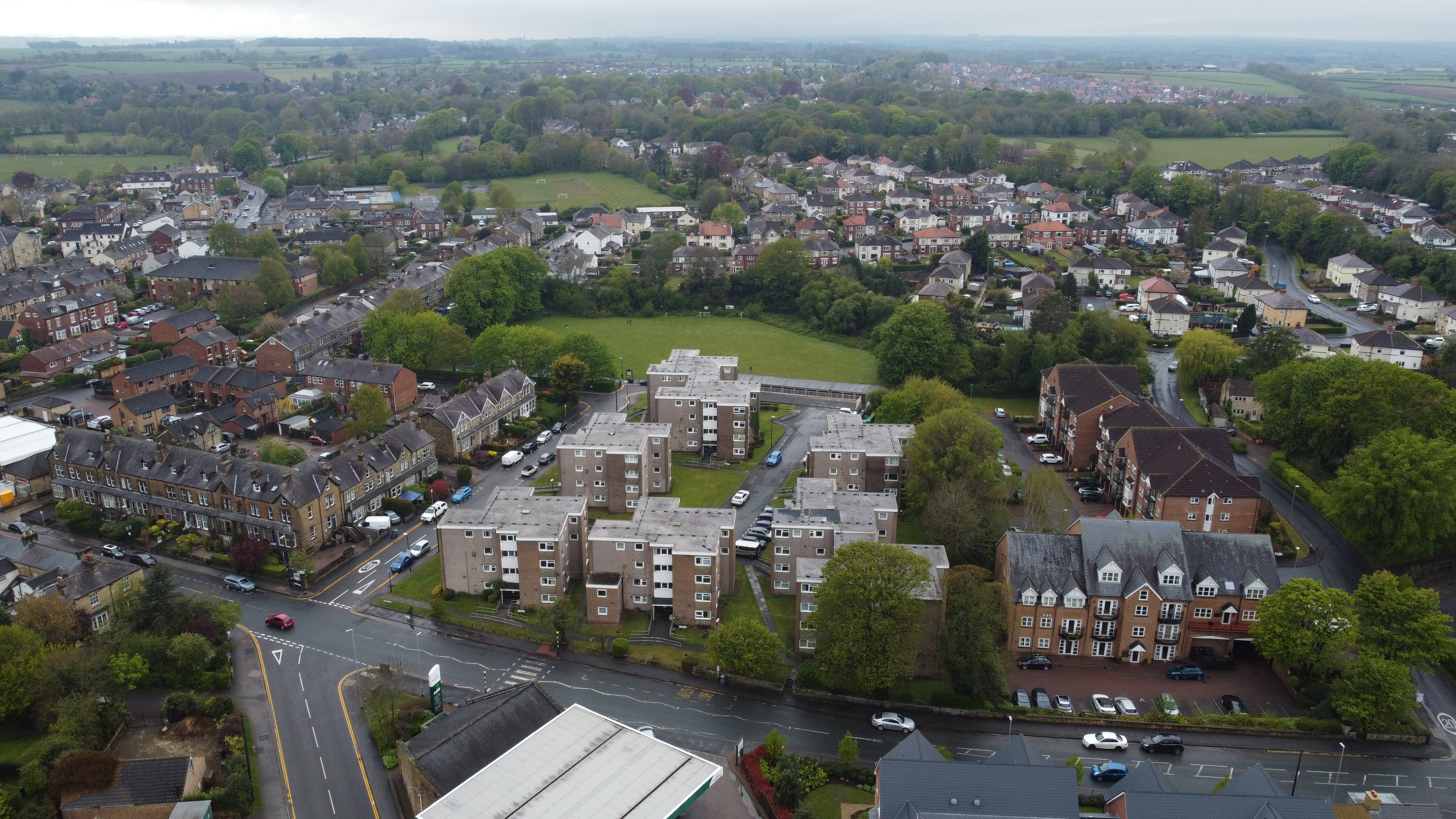
Aerial view of the town's residential areas

According to the 2001 UK Census, Wetherby had a population of 11,155 and the wider Wetherby ward had a population of 26,473 By the time of the 2011 census, the population of the town had fallen to 10,772. Since this was taken, the immediate town area has grown considerably. 150 new dwellings were built in one development in Micklethwaite, then a further 20 were added, flats have also appeared at the former Motorworld, La Locanda Restaurant, Deighton Road car garage, Fields Works and the cattle market. In the late 2010s, two new large scale greenfield housing developments started to be developed; one in the Sandbeck area and another in the Spofforth Hill area.

== Economy ==
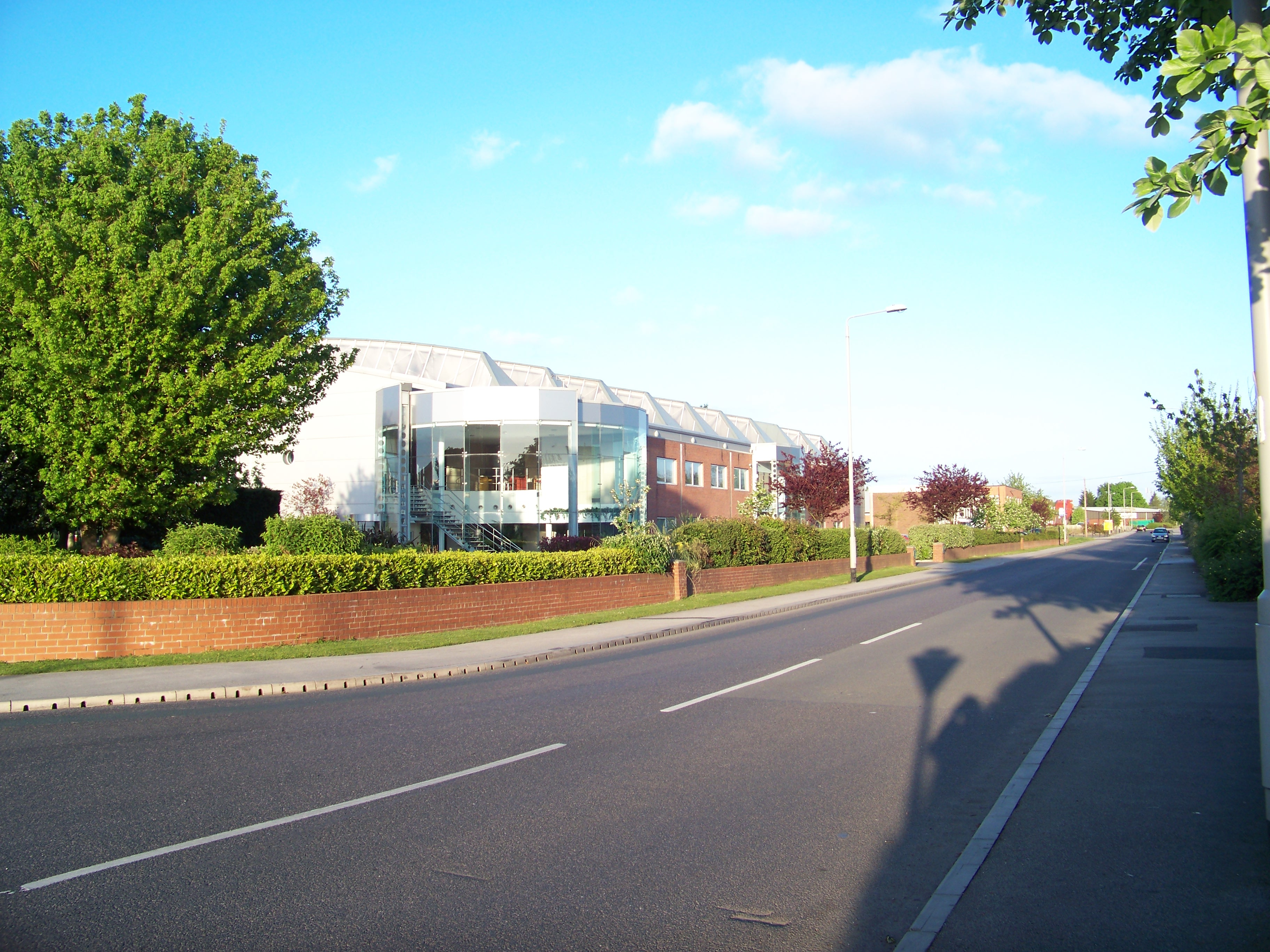
The Goldenfry factory

The Wharfedale Brewery became Oxley's mineral water factory during the inter-war years. It was demolished in the 1950s and redeveloped as the West Yorkshire Road Car Company bus depot and bus station; it has been further redeveloped to include shops, offices and a restaurant. The site of the watermill, by the weir, is now occupied by riverside flats.

Wetherby has a manufacturing presence in the town and on the Thorp Arch Trading Estate. Many residents work in Leeds or on the Sandbeck industrial estate, major retailers in the town centre or at Thorp Arch. Large employers include the British Library, Morrisons, Goldenfry Foods and Moores Furniture.

2017 saw the return of brewing to Wetherby, when the Wetherby Brew Company established a new microbrewery and taproom on the York Road Industrial Estate.

=== Historic public houses ===
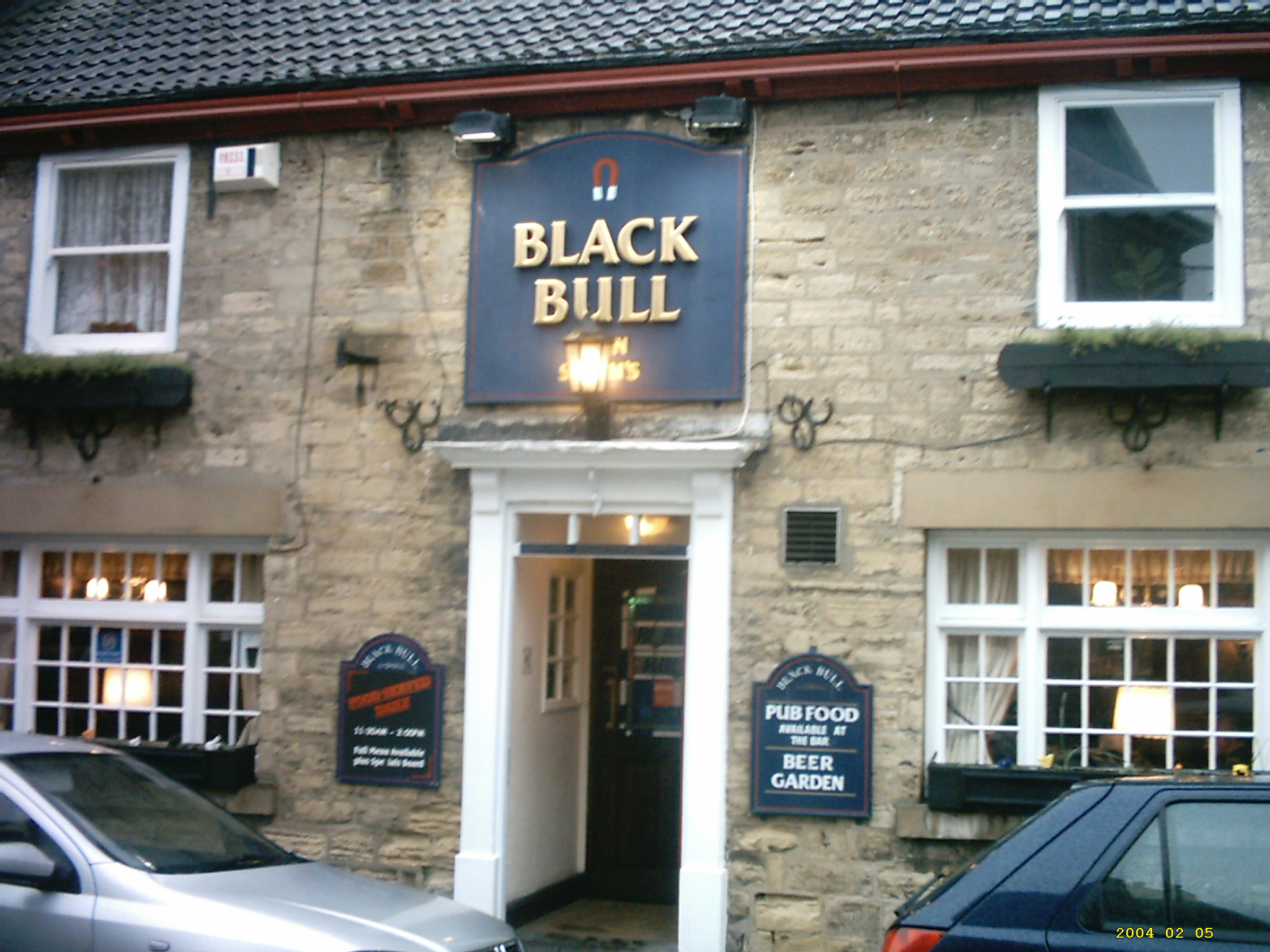
The Black Bull in 2003, before refurbishment

In its heyday, Wetherby had seventeen pubs in its town centre. Only eleven now remain, of which ten are still open. The town's oldest surviving pub, the Brunswick Hotel, closed in 2003 and reopened as Harris' Bar; in 2012, it reopened again as The Brunswick after refurbishment by Enterprise Inns. The Three Legs public house closed in 2007 and became bar Thr3, Wetherby's first non smoking pub.

During the Second World War, the Angel public house served German and Italian prisoners of war from the nearby camps and, being the only pub in the town to do so, attracted some controversy as a result.

=== Present day ===
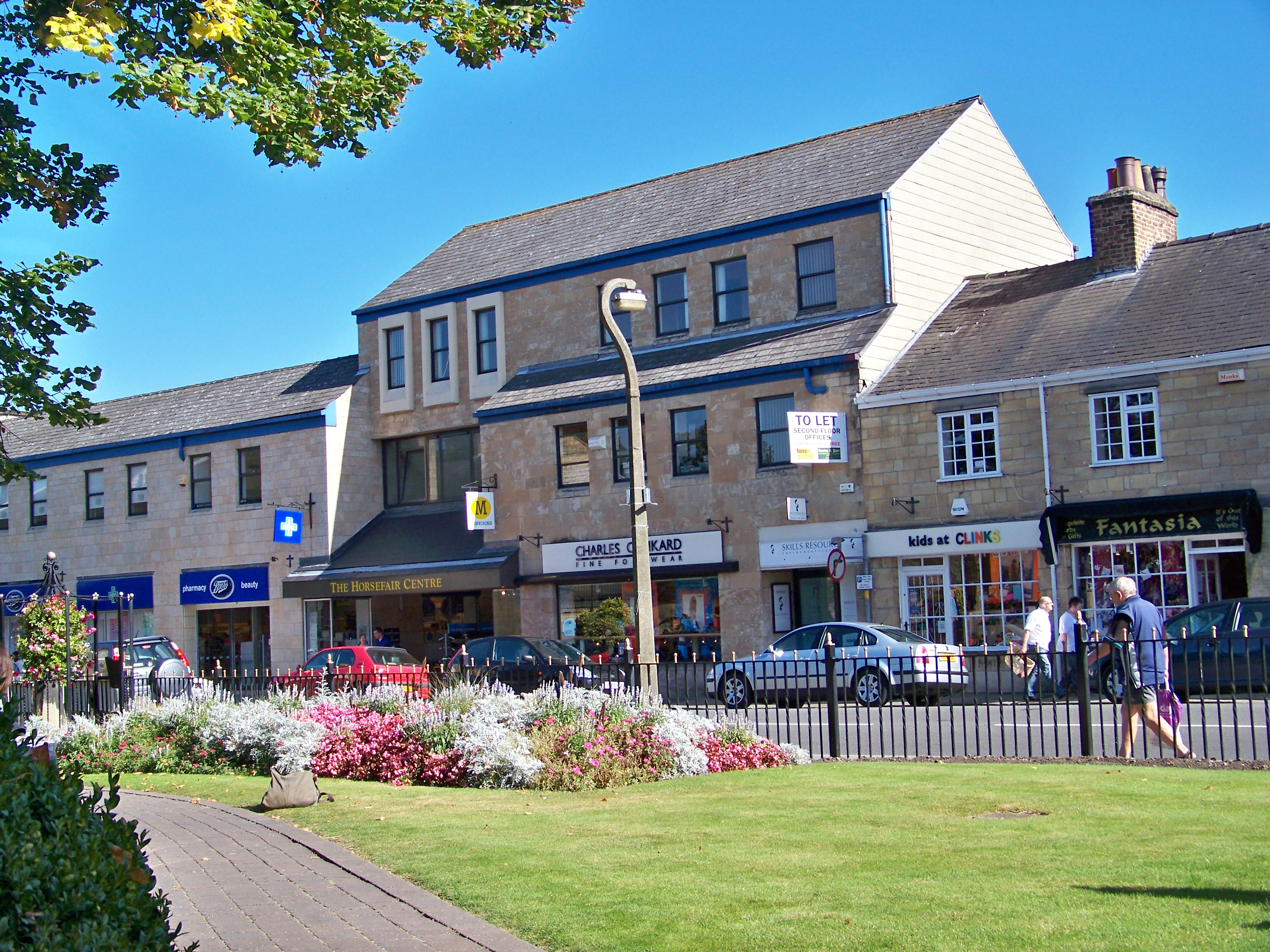
North Street, from the Garden of Rest, showing the main entrance to the Horsefair Centre

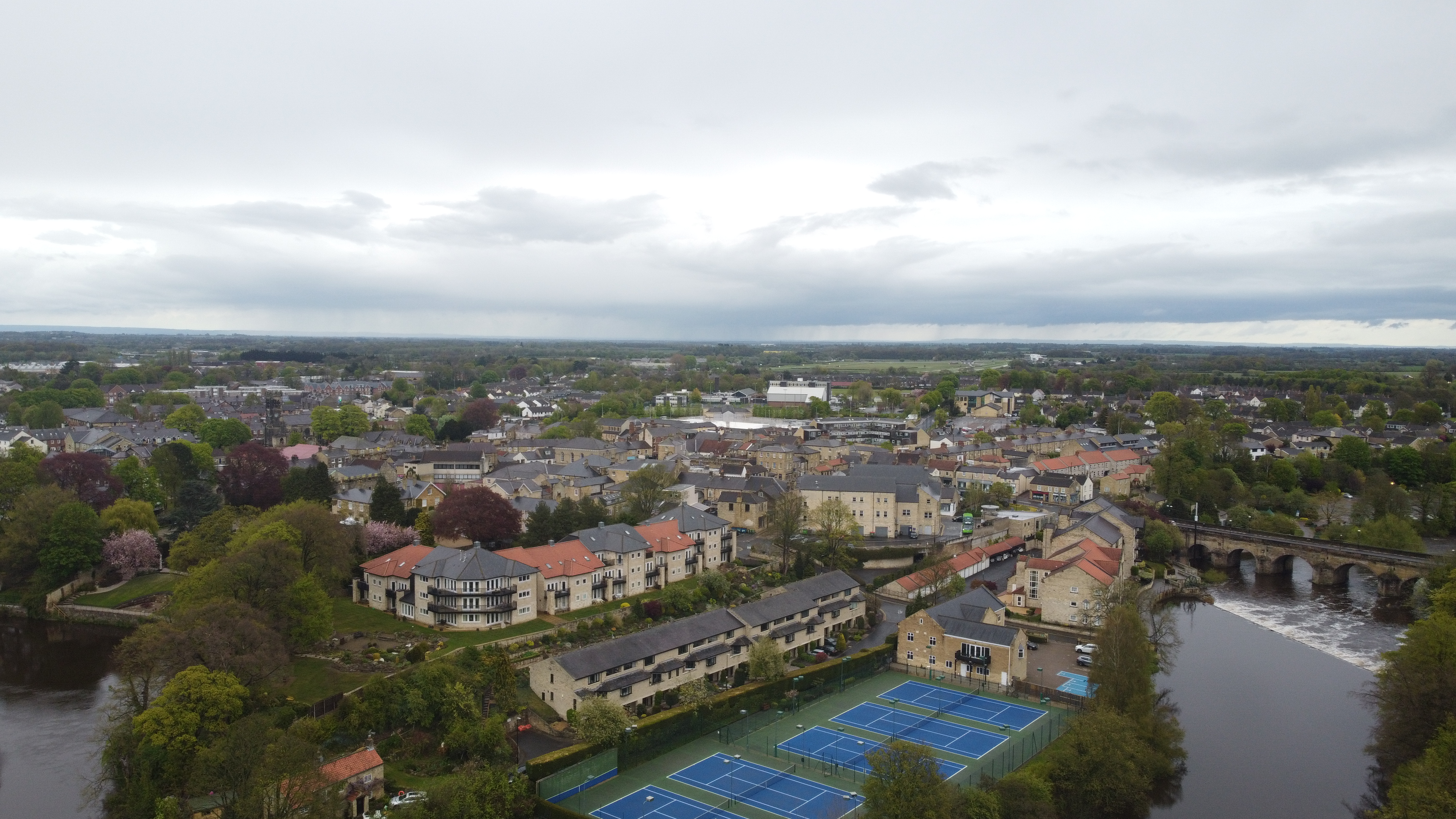
An aerial view of Wetherby town centre and the Wharfe

Goldenfry, which started as a fish and chip shop but which now makes other products including own-brand gravy for every UK supermarket, is situated on Sandbeck Way. Inspirepac has a factory on Sandbeck Lane.

The ICC Group is a multi national UK IT reseller and service provider, which was founded in 1998; it has its HQ at Sandbeck Lane. Supporting over 10% of the FTSE100, it specialises in HP/IBM and Dell products and associated IT services.

Proactis, a leading modular Source-to-Pay solutions provider, has been in based in Wetherby since 1996. Despite transitioning to a remote first workforce in 2020, the company still retains a large office in the town centre.

Farnell opened its first factory in 1956 on the York Road Industrial Estate, leasing some former W.D. Nissen huts. By 1963, it required new premises and moved to the Sandbeck Industrial Estate. In 1997, GSM Valtech Industries purchased the metalwork fabrication site of Farnell Electronics. GSM Valtech's operations were transferred to the Wetherby site, increasing the manufacturing area to 28,000 sq ft and gaining staff with 40 years' experience in manufacturing electronic enclosures. Substantial investment followed. The company specialises in the manufacture and wholesale distribution of electrical, electronic and measurement, control and instrumentation equipment. In the 1990s the company moved to offices in Armley.

The Forensic Science Service had a laboratory in Wetherby on Sandbeck Way. This closed in 2012 and has been demolished, with a new housing estate built on the site. HM Prison Wetherby is located on York Road.

On 1 October 2008, the healthcare centre on Hallfield Lane was opened by Colin Burgon, the Labour Member of Parliament (MP) for Elmet. It was completed in May 2008 and services have been provided from the building since June 2008. The centre has a range of services including podiatry, physiotherapy and a baby clinic.

== Housing ==
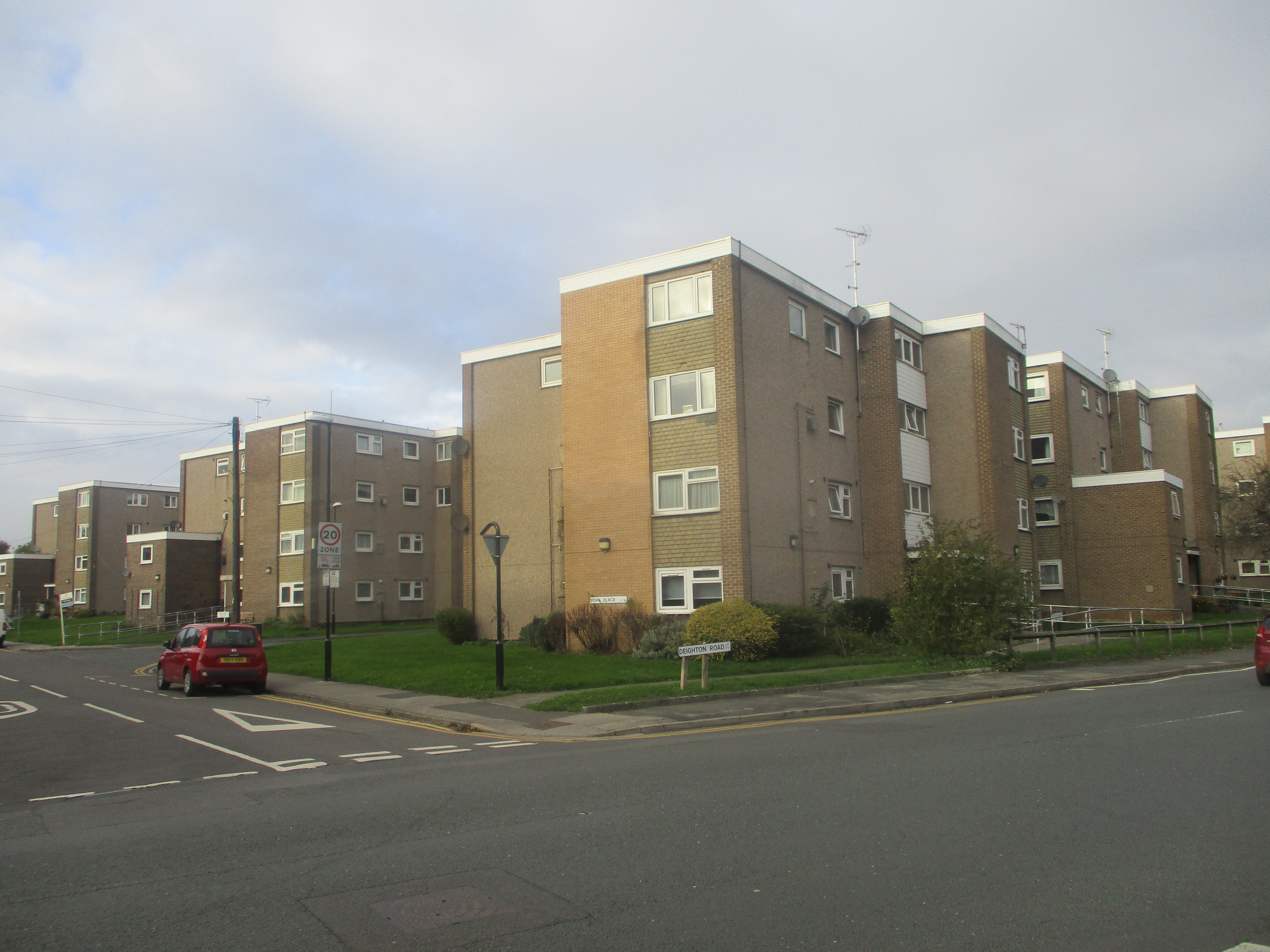
York Place flats

In 1914, 100 dwellings in Wetherby were considered unfit for habitation. This, and previous reports under the Housing, Town Planning, etc. Act 1909, led to the building of many villas. There are many surviving examples of these, such as Park Villas, York Place, Grosvenor Terrace and Sandringham Terrace. Landlords found these hard to let due to exorbitant rents and many remained empty for years. This also led to the demolition of the town's Bishopgate area. In 1910, the parish council started a programme to install street lighting in the hope of bettering the standard of living and reducing crime.

It was not until the post-war years that large housing estates appeared throughout Wetherby. From the 1940s until the 1980s, many large estates were built from scratch. Both the local corporation and the private sector built many houses to satisfy the huge demand for homes in Wetherby. Developer Norman Ashton's company, Ashtons, were responsible for much of the housing in Wetherby, particularly around the Ainsty Estate, Hall Orchards and Templar Gardens areas. Most housing in the town is from these years. There is a wide variety of housing types in Wetherby, including waterside penthouses, council flats and maisonettes, large detached houses, small terraces and probably the most common, the three bedroomed twentieth century semi-detached home.

== Transport ==
=== Roads ===
For many years from 1959, the town's bypass started at a roundabout near a Forte Group Posthouse hotel until July 1988 when the A1 was diverted at a cost of £11.5 million. On 18 December 2004, the northern section of the bypass was diverted to a new section of the A1(M), around Kirk Deighton, after construction work had begun in August 2003. The upgrade of the section between Bramham and Wetherby started in July 2007 and was completed in 2009.

The upgrading of the A1 included the construction of Wetherby Services at the Wetherby North Junction. The upgrading of the A1(M) in Wetherby was the final development after 50 years of gradual improvement to motorway standard. A new road links all routes in and out of the town with the A1(M).

=== Buses ===
Wetherby bus station in the Market Place was redeveloped in 1995; since partial pedestrianisation in 2007, capacity has been reduced.

Bus routes are operated predominantly by:

- Arriva Yorkshire operates services to Wakefield, via Garforth
- Connexionsbuses to Harrogate, York and Otley
- Harrogate Bus Company to Leeds, Deighton Bar and Harrogate
- 21 Transport to Harrogate and Knaresborough.

=== Railway ===
The nearest railway stations are at Pannal and Cattal, which are both on the Harrogate Line; Northern Trains operates services to Leeds, Harrogate, Knaresborough and York.

Wetherby had two railway stations, but both were closed as part of the Beeching Axe in 1964:

- Wetherby (Linton Road) on the North Eastern Railway's Cross Gates to Wetherby Line
- Wetherby (York Road) on the York and North Midland Railway Company's Harrogate to Church Fenton Line.

=== Air ===
The closest airport is Leeds Bradford Airport, in Yeadon.

== Education ==
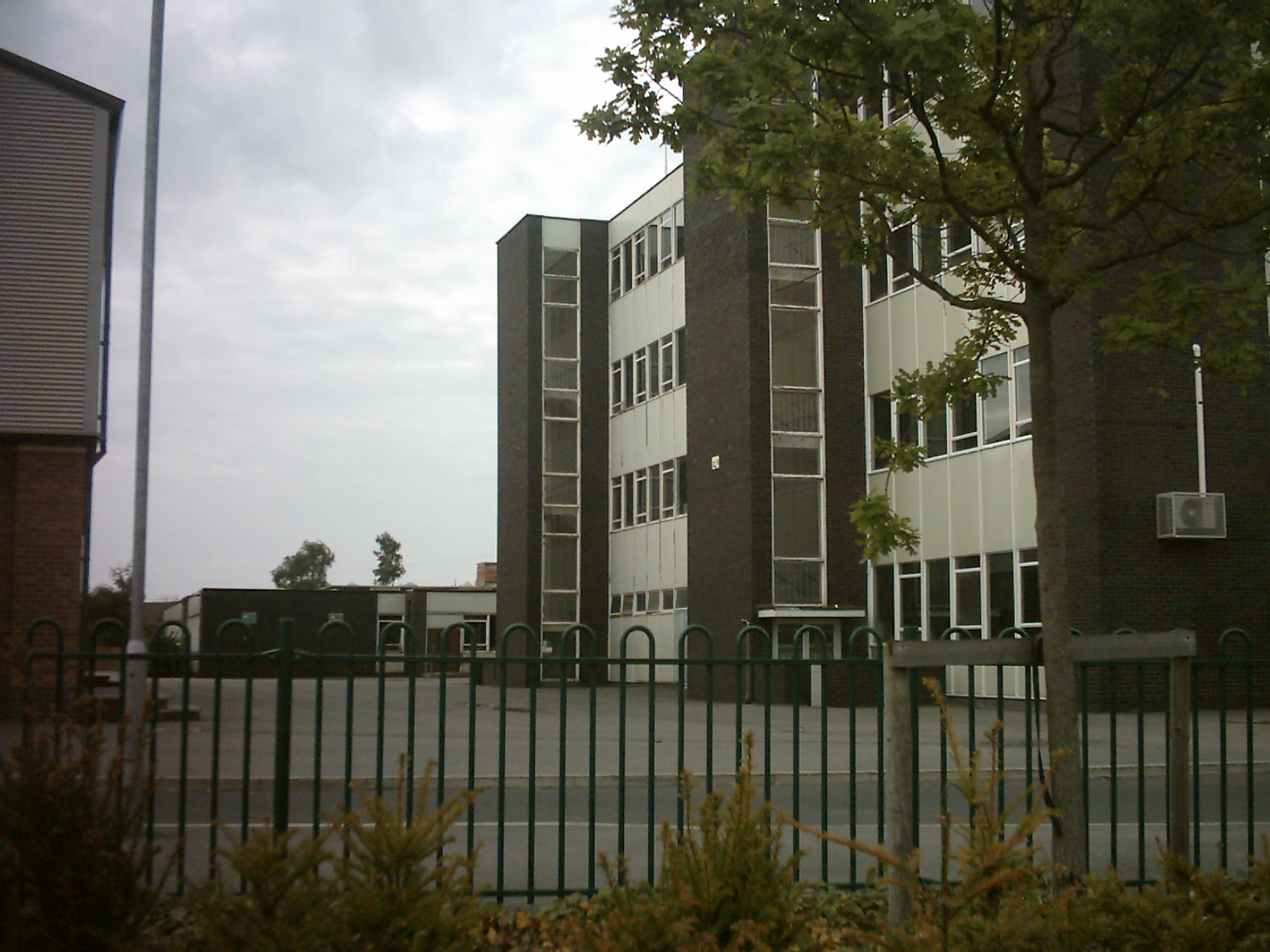
Wetherby High School

There are four primary schools situated in Wetherby: Crossley Street Primary School, Deighton Gates Primary School, St Josephs Primary School and St James C of E School. There is one secondary school, Wetherby High School (formerly Wetherby Secondary Modern School). . There is a further secondary school serving Wetherby situated in Boston Spa. The local college in Wetherby is Leeds City College.

== Sport ==
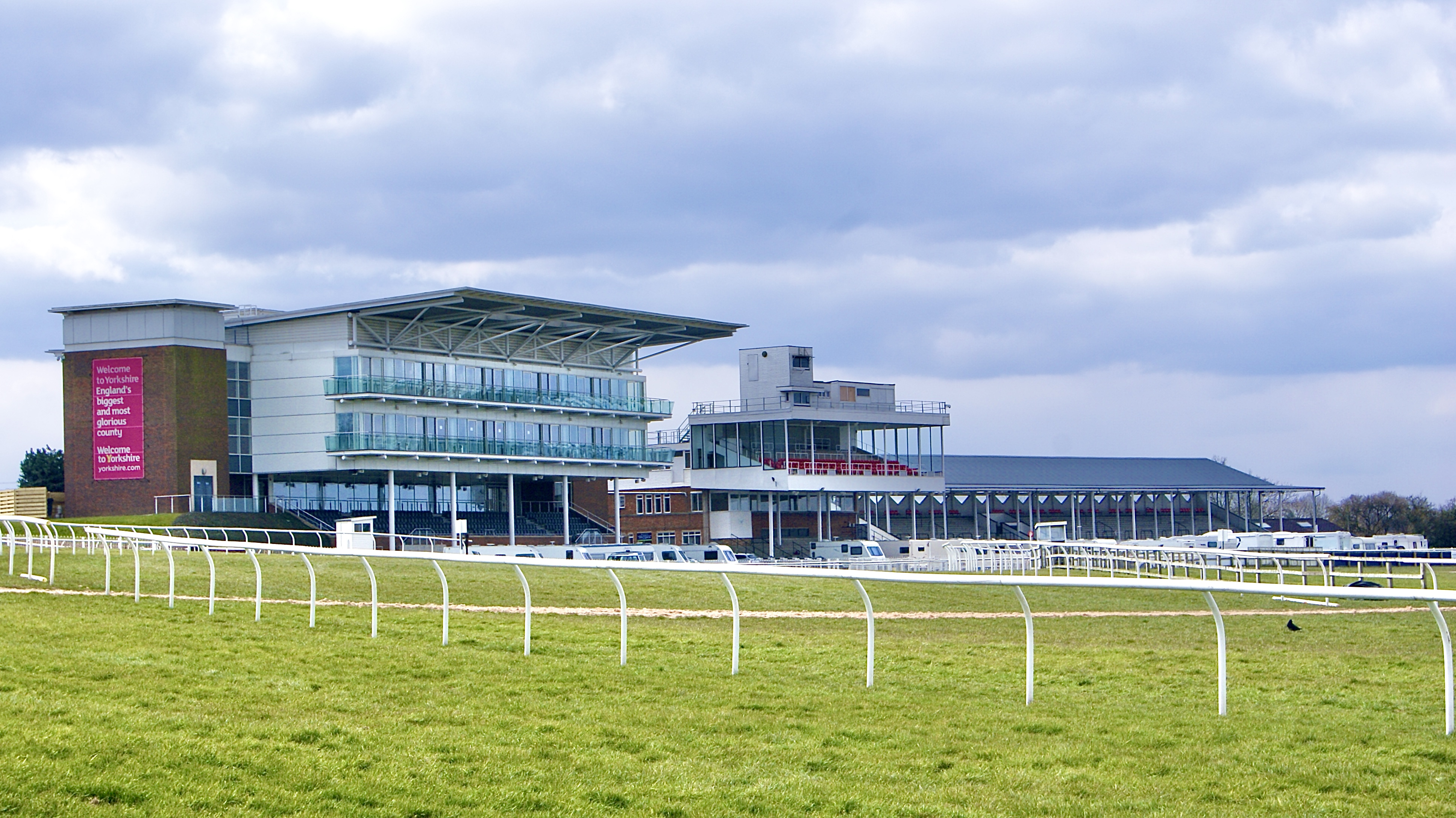
Wetherby Racecourse

The town is home to several sports clubs: Wetherby Athletic AFC, Wetherby Bulldogs RLFC and Wetherby RUFC, all playing at a higher amateur level. Wetherby Athletic play in the West Yorkshire League. The club was formed in 1949, when previous club Wetherby United folded, due to lack of players. The club groundshare with Wetherby Bulldogs RLFC at the newly refurbished ground on Ings. Three-time English champions Leeds United's training ground is located just outside Wetherby.

Wetherby Bulldogs rugby league team play at the Ings with Wetherby Athletic. The club plays in the Pennine League Division Four. The club was formed in 1983 playing in the York and District Sunday League. In the 1997/98 season, Wetherby won the league without losing a game; they also won the White Rose Cup, playing the final at Featherstone Rovers' Post Office Road ground. By 1999, the club was in Yorkshire League Division One.

The town's rugby union club plays at Grange Park, sharing with Kirk Deighton Rangers Junior Football Club and also with the town's cricket and bowls clubs, where it has a clubhouse and floodlit pitches.

Wetherby Cricket Club plays at Grange Park, adjacent to the South Wetherby A1(M)/A661 intersection. It plays in the Wetherby League and the Whixley Evening League, fielding two senior and junior sides ranging from U-9s to U-17s.

Wetherby Bowling Club was established in 1986 at Grange Park Sports Centre, sited between the cricket club and the rugby union club. It has crown and flat greens, taking part in a floodlit mini league. The club has six crown green teams (playing in the Harrogate and Tadcaster Leagues) and three flat green teams.

Formed in October 2004, Wetherby Runners Athletic Club is based at Wetherby Sports Association with a membership of over 160. A junior section competes in West Yorks Track & Field & Cross Country leagues. It competes throughout the region in Harrogate Road League, Yorkshire Dales Race Series, West Yorks Cross Country League and takes part in cross country, fell, road races and marathons. The club organises the Wetherby 10k run on the second Sunday in September at Wetherby Racecourse.

Wetherby Golf Club has an 18-hole golf course, constructed in two loops of 9 holes along Wetherby Ings where, 100 years ago, steeplechase racing was the major sporting activity. The course is almost 6,700 yards, with five variable tee positions.

Wetherby Castlegarth Tennis Club has had a presence in the town since 1904.

The route of the White Rose Way, a long-distance walk from Leeds to Scarborough, passes through the town.

Wetherby Racecourse was originally located at the Ings before moving to York Road. The course is a left-hand oval with easy bends. The racecourse has three stands, one constructed in the 1930s with football-style terracing, a two-tier seated stand constructed in the 1970s and the new Millennium Stand which opened in 1999 providing executive facilities.

Wetherby Racecourse is the starting point for the Great Yorkshire Bike Ride, an annual 70-mile (110-kilometre) ride to Filey in June, which has raised nearly £2 million for charity since its inception in 1984.

== Religion ==
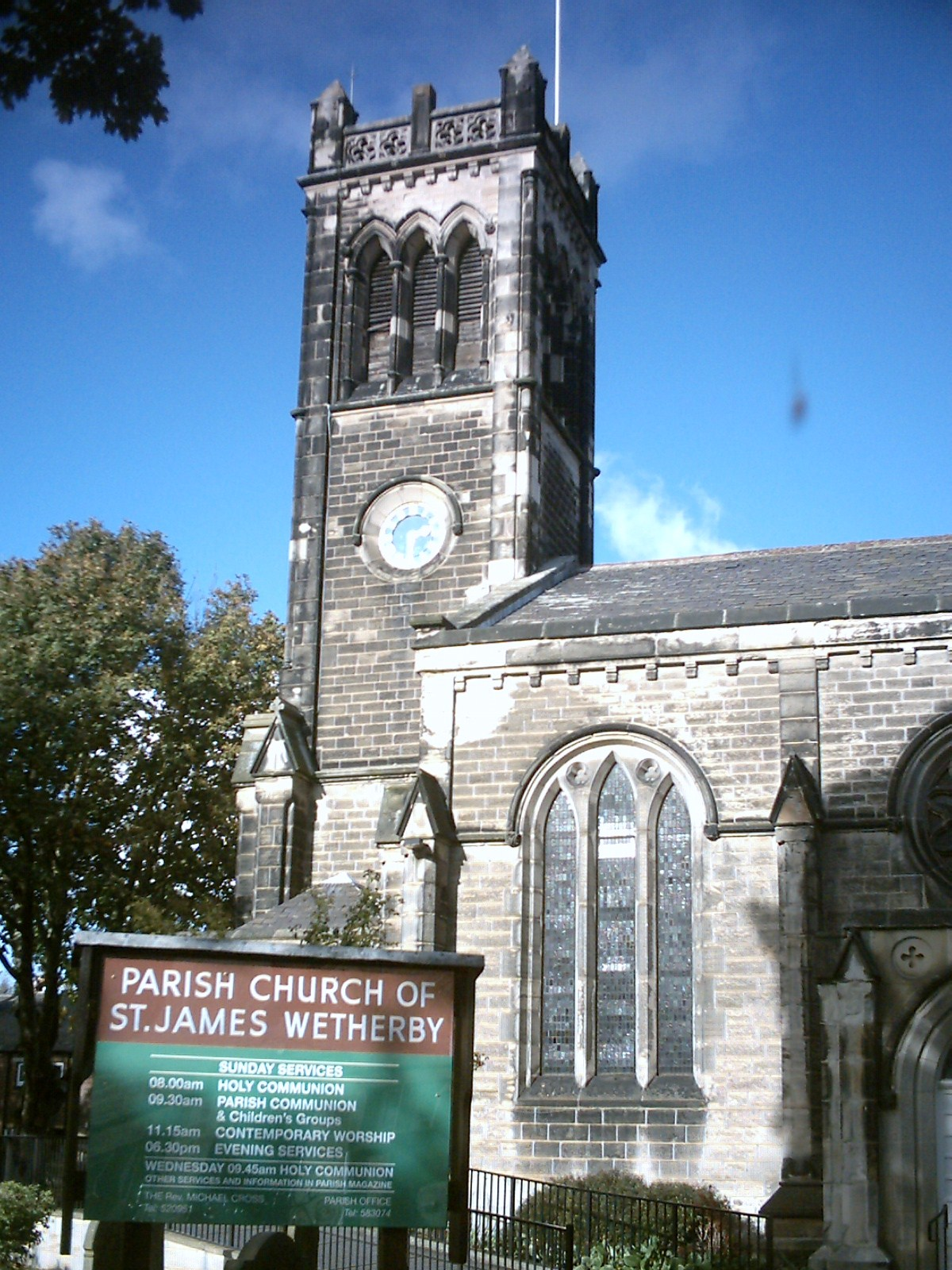
St James' Church in Wetherby, the town's largest church

There are five churches in Wetherby. The Anglican parish church is dedicated to St James and its daughter church The Church on the Corner meets in the old Cemetery Chapel on Hallfield Lane.

Wetherby Methodist Church is located on Bank Street, and there is also a Community Church of the Salvation Army. St Joseph's Roman Catholic church was opened in 1986 and won the Leeds Architecture Award in 1987. Two smaller Catholic churches in Bardsey and Sicklinghall operate as satellite churches and do not have their own priests.

The Baptist church building was originally Anglican and was known as Barleyfields Church. Early in 2009, it became part of the Baptist Union of Great Britain. It met originally in the Barleyfields Centre, but moved to Deighton Gates School in September 2009.

== Culture and media ==
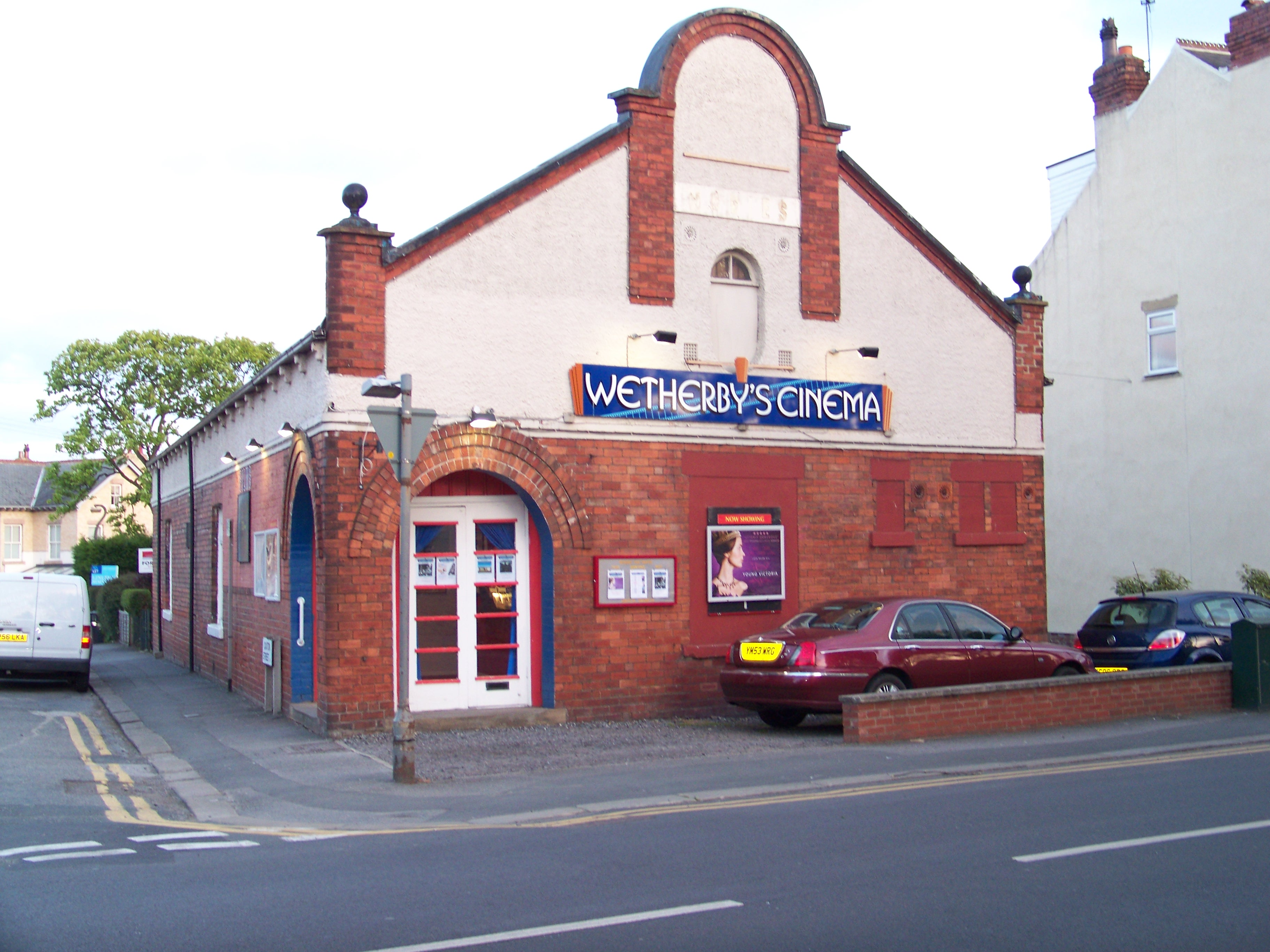
Wetherby Cinema

In 1989, the Wetherby in Bloom committee was founded and has charitable status. The town won the Entente Florale gold award in 1999 and an International Communities in Bloom award in 2005. It achieved success in the RHS Britain in Bloom competition in 1998, 2002 and 2010, along with numerous regional gold awards over the last 15 years.

The annual Wetherby Arts Festival is sponsored by Leeds City Council and Wetherby Town Council. It promotes the arts by providing a platform for local groups to perform and to bring in other performers and art forms.

On 2 July 2011 a geocache caused a bomb scare in the town, attracting news coverage by the BBC, the geocache was then involved in a controlled explosion leading to its destruction.

The local newspaper is the Wetherby News and the lifestyle magazine is the Excelle.

Local radio stations are BBC Radio Leeds, Heart Yorkshire, Greatest Hits Radio Yorkshire and Capital Yorkshire. Tempo FM is Wetherby's very own 100% volunteer-run community radio station, with studios located in the old council offices in Westgate.

Local news and television programmes are provided by BBC Yorkshire and ITV Yorkshire, from the Emley Moor TV transmitter.

Wetherby Film Theatre is an independently-owned, traditional single screen cinema on Caxton Street. Although it opened in 1915 as a cinema, it had been used for some time as a bingo and social club, before being reopened as a cinema in 1994. During 2022 it would undergo internal refurbishments, adding a second screen, a bar and sofa seating. The cinema would reopen in November rebranding to 'Wetherby Cinema'.

== Notable people ==
Wetherby-born Second World War flying ace 'Ginger' Lacey, in about 1940

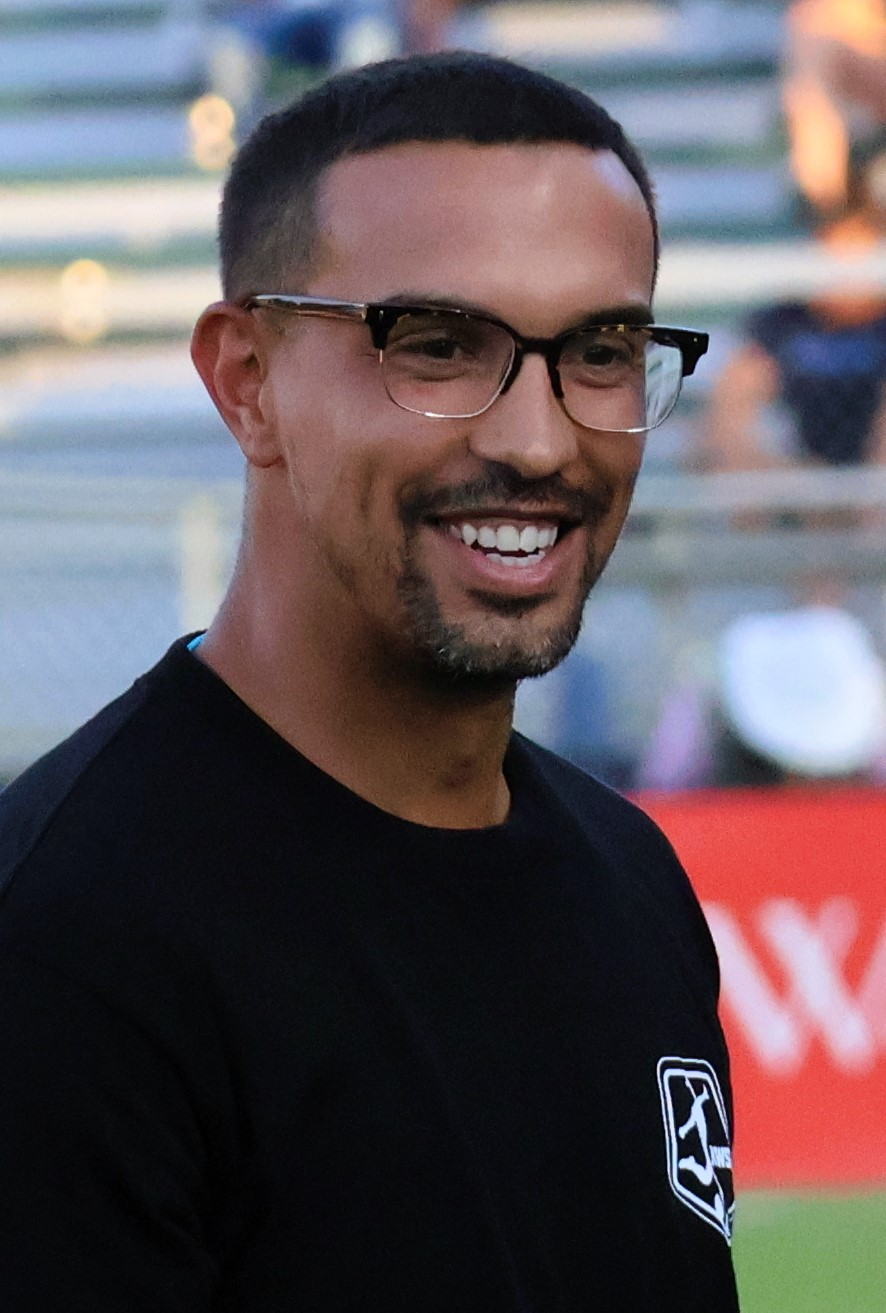
Major League Soccer footballer Seb Hines was born and raised in Wetherby

- Beer and whisky expert Michael Jackson (1942–2007) was born in Wetherby.
- Flight Lieutenant 'Ginger' Lacey (1917–1989), a Battle of Britain flying ace, was born in Wetherby. Lacey Grove is named after him.
- Former goalkeeper Stuart Naylor was born in Wetherby in 1962. He was capped three times for the England B team in the 1980s
- Yorkshire Cricketer Charles Midgley was born in Wetherby in 1877 and died in Bradford in 1942.
- Former Conservative MEP Robert Sturdy was born in Wetherby in 1944. He has never represented Yorkshire constituencies, holding seats in the Tory heartlands of Cambridgeshire and Bedfordshire.
- Essex Cricketer Fred Cooper was born in Wetherby in 1888.
- Former Middlesbrough F.C. footballer, Seb Hines (born 1988), is from the Hallfields Estate in Wetherby.
- Skins Actor Sam Jackson also comes from Wetherby and was born in October 1993.
- Reginald Wickham, cricketer
- Emily Wardman, museum curator

== See also ==
- Listed buildings in Wetherby
