= Wetherby railway station =

Wetherby railway station can refer to three railway stations in Wetherby, West Yorkshire:

- Wetherby (Linton Road) railway station - The last operating railway station in the town
- Wetherby (York Road) railway station - The first railway station in the town
- Wetherby Racecourse railway station - A former station serving Wetherby Racecourse.
