= Wetherby Racecourse railway station =

Disused railway station in West Yorkshire, England

Wetherby
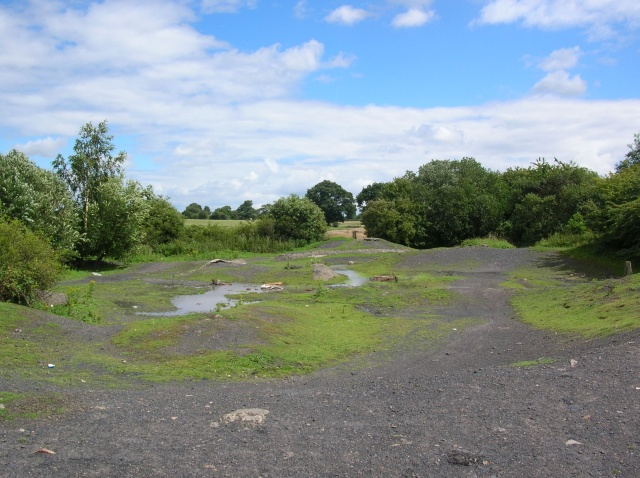
- Site of the station in 2007

General information
- Location: Wetherby, City of Leeds; England
- Coordinates: 53.930°N 1.358°W
- Grid reference: SE420482
- Platforms: 2 through

Other information
- Status: Disused

History
- Original company: London and North Eastern Railway
- Post-grouping: London and North Eastern Railway; British Railways (N.E. region)

Key dates
- 1924: Opened
- 18 May 1959: Last used
- 1962: Demolished
Location

Wetherby Racecourse railway station was a railway station on the Harrogate to Church Fenton Line serving Wetherby Racecourse in Wetherby, West Yorkshire, England.

When Wetherby's original station on York Road closed in 1902, for two decades the only rail access was via Wetherby's new station on Linton Road. This was some distance from the racecourse, involving a walk of just over 2 miles (3.2 km).

There was therefore a station built at Wetherby Racecourse in 1924, with a ticket booth of wooden construction, starter signals, a ground frame and a footbridge. It even boasted electrical lighting and its own nameboard. It was located on the line going south east towards Tadcaster and Church Fenton and had two platforms; one for each running line.

Race specials would stop at this 'Racecourse station', about three-quarters of a mile (1.2 km) from Linton Road towards Thorp Arch. These specials came from Leeds, Doncaster and Bradford Exchange and Sheffield.

Reports vary as to when it closed; one report says it stayed open until 1963 with Racecourse Specials running to the station from Bradford Exchange on racedays, whilst another publication states that it was last used on Whit Monday 18 May 1959 and was demolished in 1962. The line closed in 1964.

Preceding station	Historical railways	Following station
Wetherby (York Road); Line and station closed	LNER; Harrogate to Church Fenton Line	Thorp Arch; Line closed; station closed
