= Spofforth railway station =

Former railway station in North Yorkshire, England

Spofforth
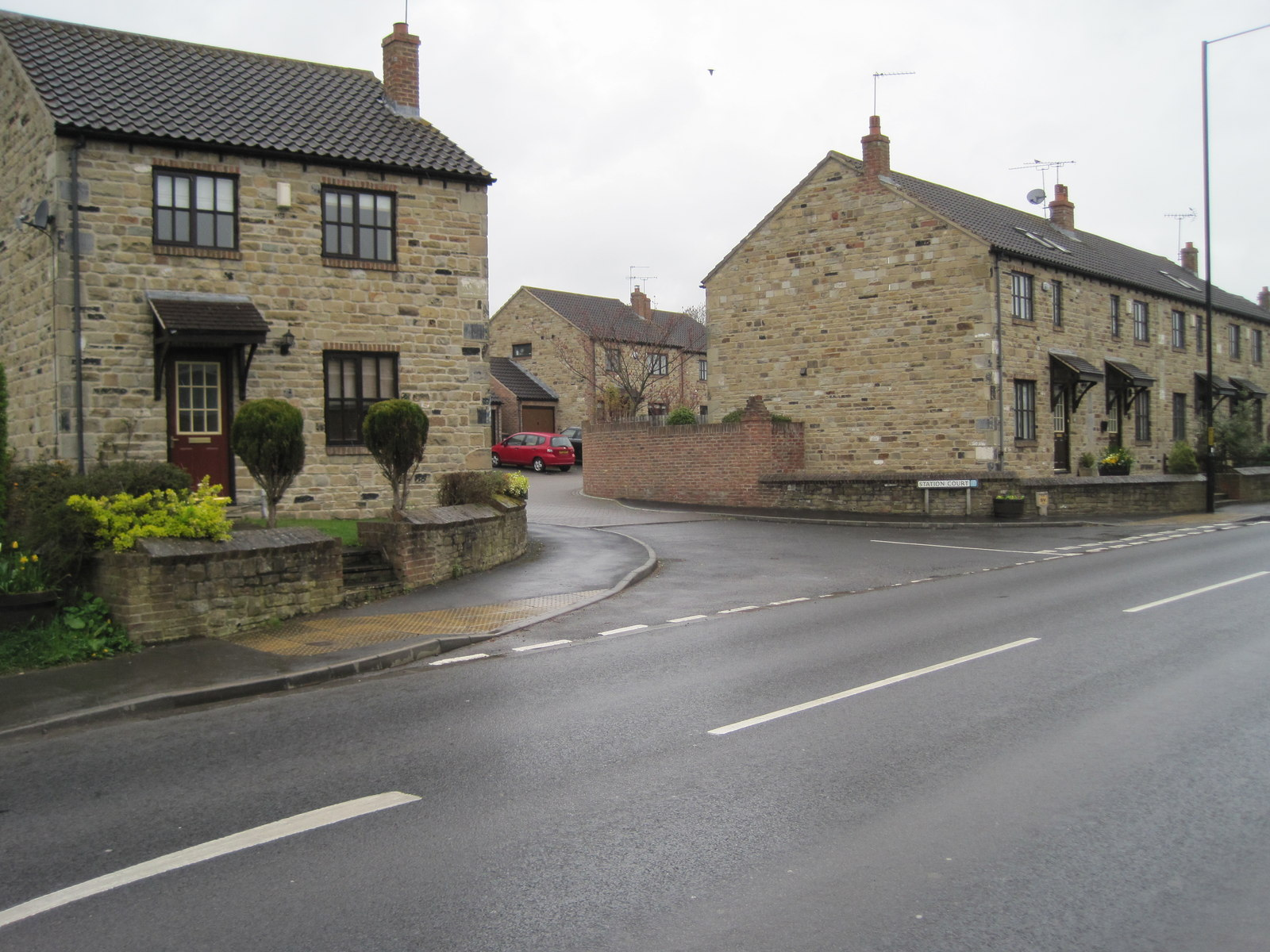
- Site of the former station (2012)

General information
- Location: Spofforth, North Yorkshire; England
- Coordinates: 53.9513°N 1.4444°W
- Grid reference: SE365508
- Platforms: 2

Other information
- Status: Disused

History
- Original company: York and North Midland Railway until 1854
- Pre-grouping: North Eastern Railway 1854-1923
- Post-grouping: LNER 1923-1948, BR (N.E region) 1948 to closure

Key dates
- 10 August 1847: Opened as temporary terminus
- 20 July 1848: Became a through station
- 6 January 1964: Closed
- by 1971: Demolished
Location

Spofforth railway station was a stop on the Harrogate–Church Fenton line in Spofforth, North Yorkshire, England.

== History ==
The station opened on 10 August 1847 as the temporary terminus of the York and North Midland Railway line from Church Fenton; this was due to engineering works between Spofforth and Harrogate, which included the Prospect Tunnel and the Crimple Valley Viaduct, had not been finished at this date. horse-drawn omnibuses provided onward transport to Harrogate until the remainder of the line to Harrogate Brunswick station was opened to traffic on 20 July 1848 and Spofforth became a through station. It transferred to the North Eastern Railway (NER) in 1854.

In the early 20th century, barley was the main freight handled at the station. In the 1950s, general goods and livestock (including horses and prize cattle) were handled here, and the station offered the carriage of motor cars by train.

The station was closed completely on 6 January 1964 and, by 1971, most of the buildings had been demolished.

== Location ==
The station was located at the level crossing with today's A661 road at the southern end of the village. West of it (53.9541°N 1.4521°W), near Spofforth Castle, a short viaduct with five spans of about 35 feet (10.7 m) height and slightly over 30 feet (9 m) length led the line across a hollow. It is still standing, but in a deteriorating condition. Between Spofforth and Wetherby York Road, close to the latter station, was the triangular junction with the Cross Gates–Wetherby line.

== Facilities ==
The station had two side platforms. The station building, designed by George Townsend Andrews and similar to that of Ruswarp, stood on the up platform. The down platform had a wooden waiting room of standard NER design. The signal box was located on the south-eastern side of the level crossing on the down side of the line. The main goods yard was located behind the down platform and was accessed from the west. Its two sidings served a stone-built goods shed and a loading dock. A cattle dock on the up side was served by a third siding north-west of the crossing. Two more sidings on the up side, serving the coal yard, branched off south-east of the level crossing.

== The site today ==
The area was built over in the mid-1990s and the housing development of Station Court now occupies the site.

Preceding station	Historical railways	Following station
Wetherby York Road; Line and station closed	London and North Eastern Railway; Harrogate to Church Fenton Line	Crimple; Line and station closed
