= Crimple railway station =

Short-lived railway station in Crimple, Harrogate

Crimple

General information
- Location: Crimple, North Riding of Yorkshire; England
- Coordinates: 53.9699°N 1.509°W
- Grid reference: SE322527

Other information
- Status: Disused

History
- Original company: North Eastern Railway
- Pre-grouping: North Eastern Railway

Key dates
- November 1867: Opened
- May 1869: Closed
Location

Crimple railway station served the suburb of Crimple, in the historical county of North Riding of Yorkshire, England, from 1867 to 1869 on the Harrogate–Church Fenton line.

== History ==
The station was opened in November 1867 by the North Eastern Railway. It was situated south of the Crimple Viaduct. It was also known as Crimple Junction in the Knaresborough Post May timetable. It also had a locomotive shed. It was a very short-lived station, only being open for one year and a half before closing in May 1869. The locomotive shed closed shortly after.

Preceding station	Disused railways	Following station
Harrogate; Line and station open	North Eastern Railway; Harrogate-Church Fenton line	Spofforth; Line and station closed
