= Thorner railway station =

Disused railway station in West Yorkshire, England

Thorner
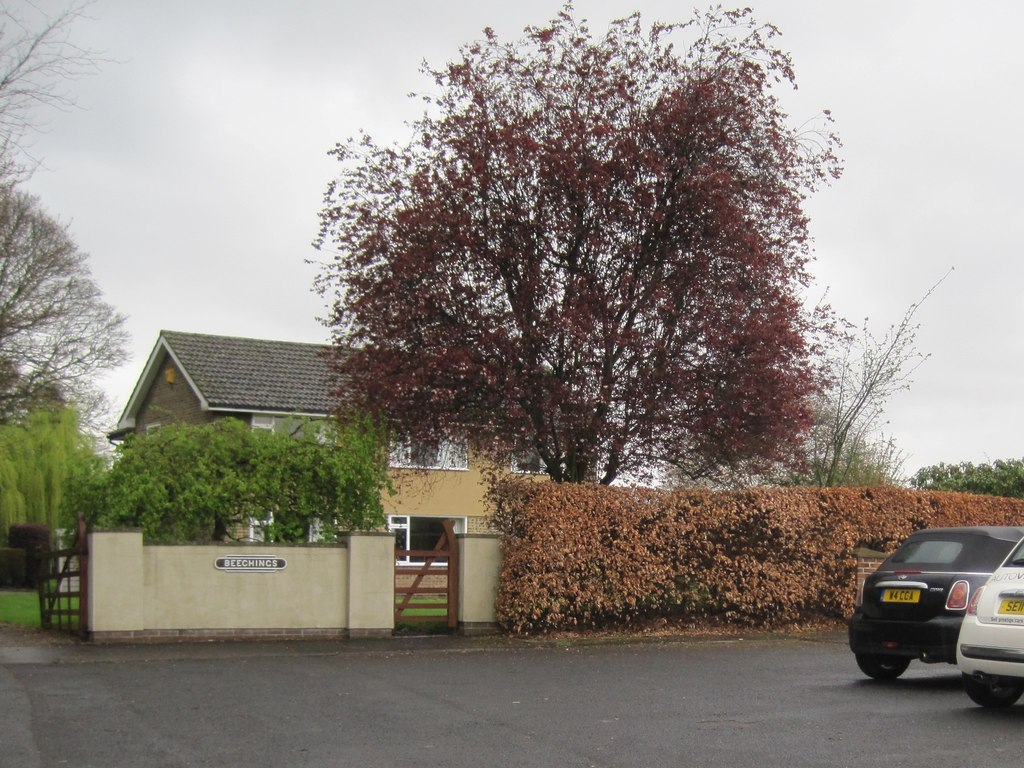
- Site of the former station in 2012

General information
- Location: West Yorkshire, City of Leeds; England
- Coordinates: 53.8612°N 1.4269°W
- Grid reference: SE378408
- Platforms: 1 (until 1901), later 2

Other information
- Status: Disused

History
- Original company: North Eastern Railway
- Post-grouping: London and North Eastern Railway until 1948; British Railways (N.E region) 1948 to closure

Key dates
- 1876: Opened
- 1964: Closed
Location

Thorner railway station was a station in Thorner, West Yorkshire, England, on the Cross Gates–Wetherby line. It opened on 1 May 1876 and closed on 6 January 1964. It served Thorner village immediately south of the station as well as the village of Scarcroft 1 mile (1.6 km) to the west. The station was originally called Thorner & Scarcroft, in 1885 it was renamed Scarcroft for some time before reverting to the old name, and in 1901 the name was finally shortened to Thorner.

When opened, the station had only one platform with a brick station building of a typical North Eastern Railway design, similar to the one in Garforth, and a long siding opposite to the platform, but no passing loop. On the down side there was a goods yard, consisting of a loop and three sidings, two of them serving a cattle dock, the third (also equipped with a loop) serving coal drops. A signal box controlled movements in the station and the goods yard. When the line from Cross Gates was doubled in 1901, a second platform with a timber waiting room was built, and the platforms were connected by a metal foot bridge at their southern ends. Until closure, the station remained oil-lit and kept its pre-nationalisation signage. Due to high operating costs compared to low patronage, the line and its stations were earmarked for closure on 23 October 1963 and closed to all traffic on 6 January 1964. The tracks were lifted in 1966. The station area and the goods yard were cleared in the 1970s for new housing, and only the platform edges remain in one of the gardens. The station master's house still stands in the vicinity of the former station.

== Lines ==
Preceding station	Disused railways	Following station
Scholes; Line closed; station closed	London and North Eastern Railway; Cross Gates to Wetherby Line	Bardsey; Line closed; station closed
