= Newton Kyme railway station =

Disused railway station in North Yorkshire, England

Newton Kyme
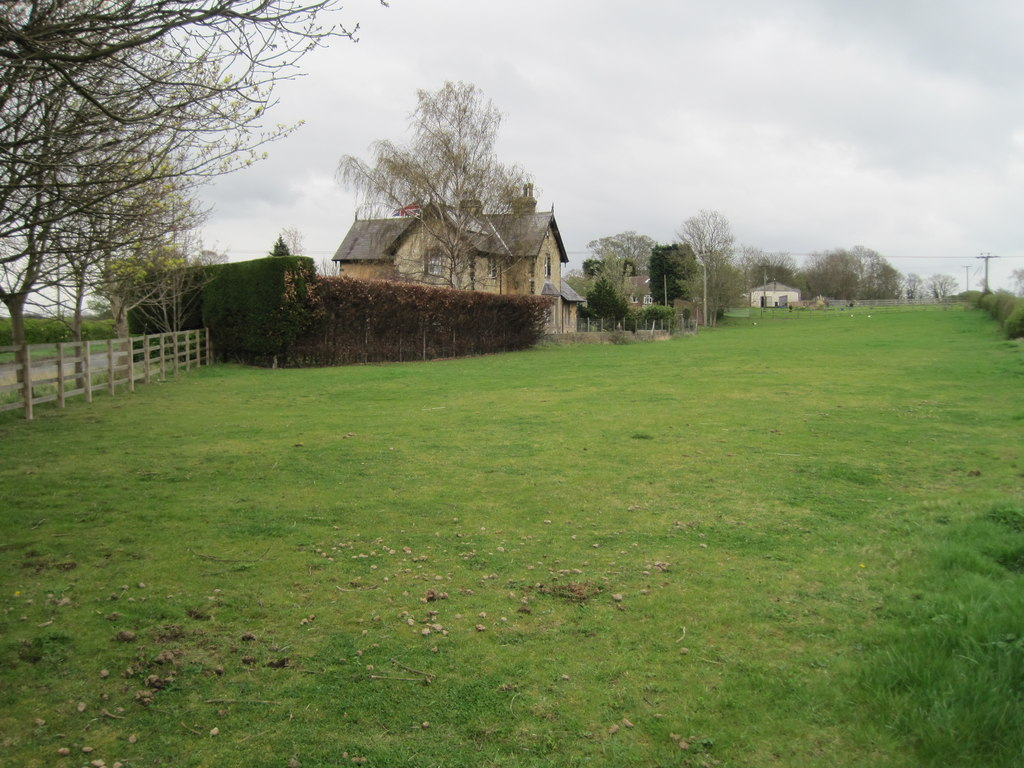
- Site of the former station in 2012

General information
- Location: Newton Kyme, North Yorkshire; England
- Coordinates: 53.8964°N 1.3115°W
- Grid reference: SE 455 446
- Platforms: 2

Other information
- Status: Disused

History
- Original company: York and North Midland Railway until 1854
- Pre-grouping: North Eastern Railway 1854-1923
- Post-grouping: LNER 1923-1948, BR (N.E region) 1948 to closure

Key dates
- 10 August 1847: Opened as Newton
- August 1850: Renamed into Newton Kyme
- 6 January 1964: Closed to passengers
- 6 July 1964: Closed
Location

Newton Kyme railway station was a railway station on the former Harrogate–Church Fenton line, serving the village of Newton Kyme near Tadcaster in North Yorkshire. It handled freight and passenger traffic.

== History ==
The station was opened together with the line on 10 August 1847 by the York and North Midland Railway. Originally named Newton, it was renamed in August 1850. In 1854 the original company was absorbed into the North Eastern Railway. The main freights at the beginning of the 20th century were barley and livestock. Upon grouping in 1923, the line and station passed to the London and North Eastern Railway which in turn became part of the North Eastern Region of British Railways in 1948. The station closed to passengers on 6 January 1964 and completely on 6 July 1964. The tracks were lifted in September 1966. The station building has been converted into a private residence.

== Location and facilities ==
The station was located southeast of the level crossing with Wetherby Road. It had two side platforms, a station building (designed by G. T. Andrews) on the up platform, and a timber waiting room next to a timber goods shed on the down platform. A single goods siding serving a cattle dock and passing through the goods shed was located behind the down platform. A short loop north of the level crossing, also on the down side, served another dock. Another siding branched off the loop and served coal drops. The crossing and the goods sidings were controlled by a signal box which was located on the up side northwest of the level crossing.

Preceding station	Disused railways	Following station
Tadcaster; Line closed; station closed	Harrogate to Church Fenton Line	Thorp Arch; Line closed; station closed
