= Bardsey railway station =

Disused railway station in West Yorkshire, England

Bardsey
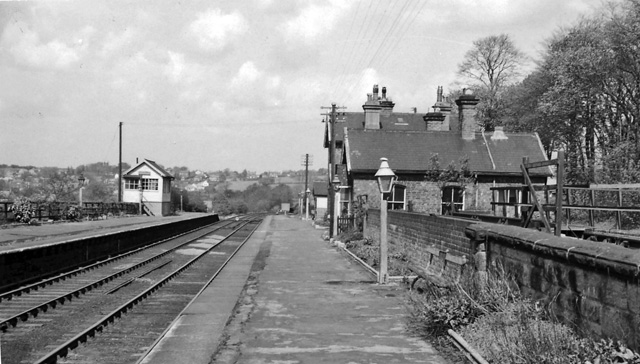
- Bardsey station, March 1961

General information
- Location: Bardsey, City of Leeds; England
- Coordinates: 53.8877°N 1.4423°W
- Platforms: 2

Other information
- Status: Disused

History
- Original company: North Eastern Railway
- Pre-grouping: North Eastern Railway
- Post-grouping: London and North Eastern Railway; British Railways (N.E. region)

Key dates
- 1 May 1876: Opened
- 6 January 1964: Closed to passengers
- 27 April 1964: Closed for goods
Location

Bardsey railway station was a railway station on the Cross Gates to Wetherby line serving the village of Bardsey, West Yorkshire connecting it with the town of Wetherby to the North and the city of Leeds to the south. The station opened in 1876 and closed, along with the line, following the Beeching axe in 1964.

== Lines ==
Preceding station	Disused railways	Following station
Thorner; Line closed; station closed	LNER; Cross Gates to Wetherby Line	Collingham Bridge; Line closed; station closed
