= Osmondthorpe railway station =

Disused railway station in West Yorkshire, England

Osmondthorpe
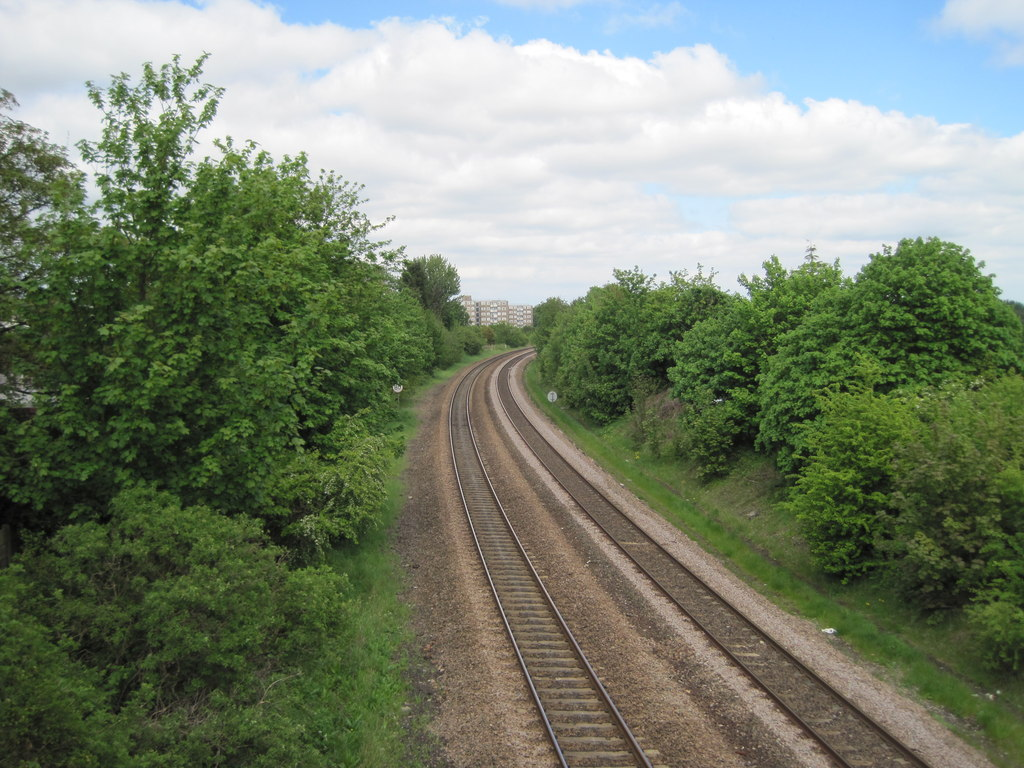
- Site of the former station in 2013

General information
- Location: Osmondthorpe, City of Leeds; England
- Coordinates: 53.7994°N 1.4901°W
- Grid reference: SE337338

Other information
- Status: Disused

History
- Post-grouping: London and North Eastern Railway

Key dates
- 29 September 1930: Opened as Osmandthorpe Halt
- 3 May 1937: Renamed Osmandthorpe
- 5 March 1960: Closed
Location

Osmondthorpe was a railway station between Leeds and Cross Gates on the Leeds to York Line (part of the Cross Country Route). It was opened as Osmondthorpe Halt by the London and North Eastern Railway in September 1930 to serve new estates being built in the area. The station was of timber construction and was built without goods facilities. After May 1937, the word Halt was dropped from the station name.

The station was closed in March 1960.

| Preceding station | Historical railways | Following station |
|---|---|---|
| Leeds Marsh Lane; Line open, station closed | London and North Eastern Railway | Cross Gates; Line and station open |
