= St Peter's Church, Thorner =

Coordinates: 53°51′34.9″N 1°25′26.6″W

St Peter's Church
- Church of Saint Peter
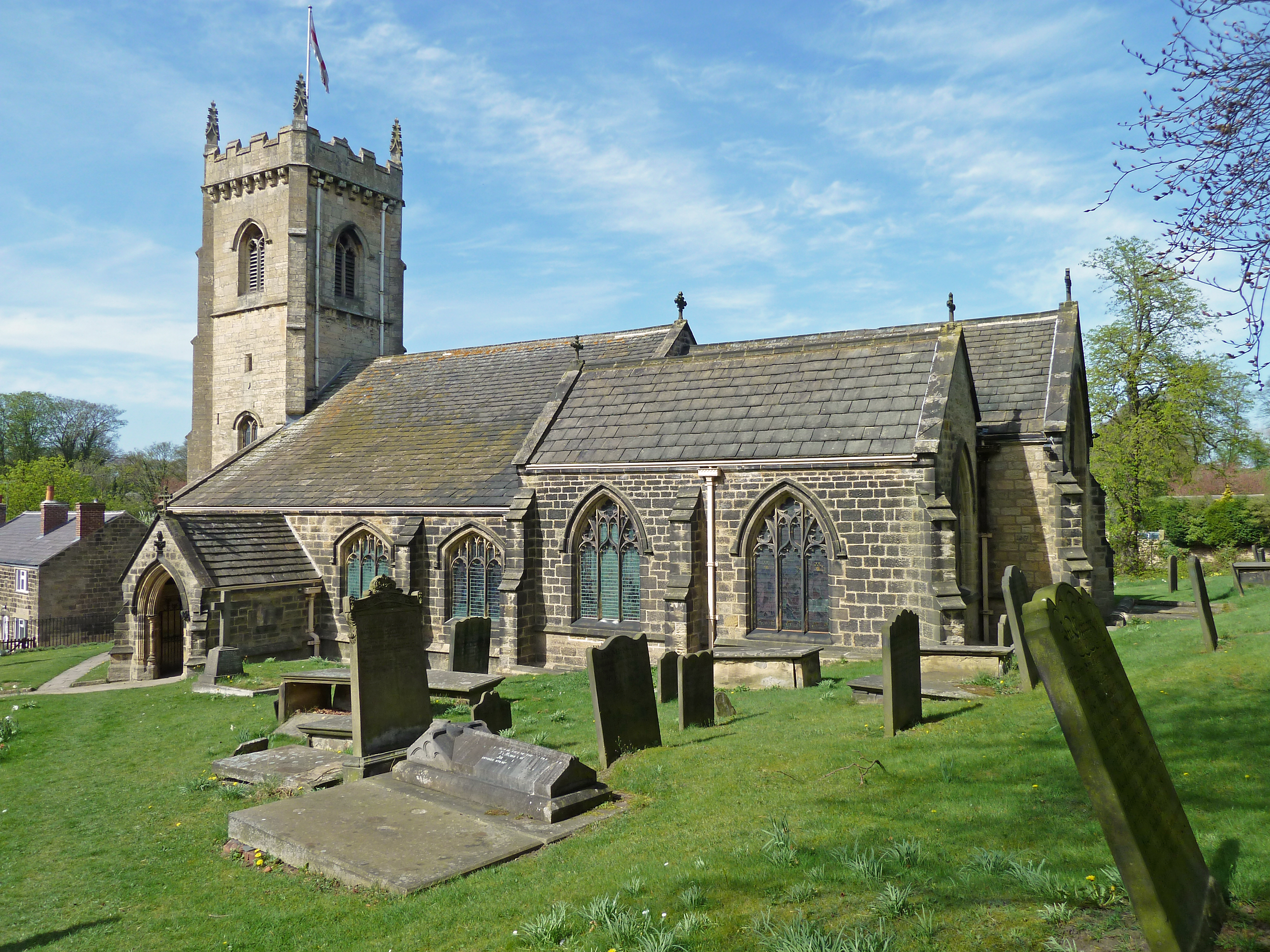
- St Peter's Church
- OS grid reference: SE 37987 40539
- Location: Thorner, West Yorkshire
- Country: England
- Denomination: Church of England

History
- Status: Parish Church

Architecture
- Heritage designation: Grade II listed building

Specifications
- Materials: limestone tower, gritstone chancel with stone slate roof

Administration
- Province: York
- Diocese: Leeds
- Archdeaconry: Leeds
- Parish: Thorner with Scarcroft

St Peter's Church in Thorner, West Yorkshire, England is an active Anglican parish church in the archdeaconry of Leeds and the Diocese of Leeds. The church is part of Elmete Trinity Benefice, which consists of the parishes of All Saints, Barwick in Elmet, St Philip's, Scholes and St Peter's, Thorner.

== History ==
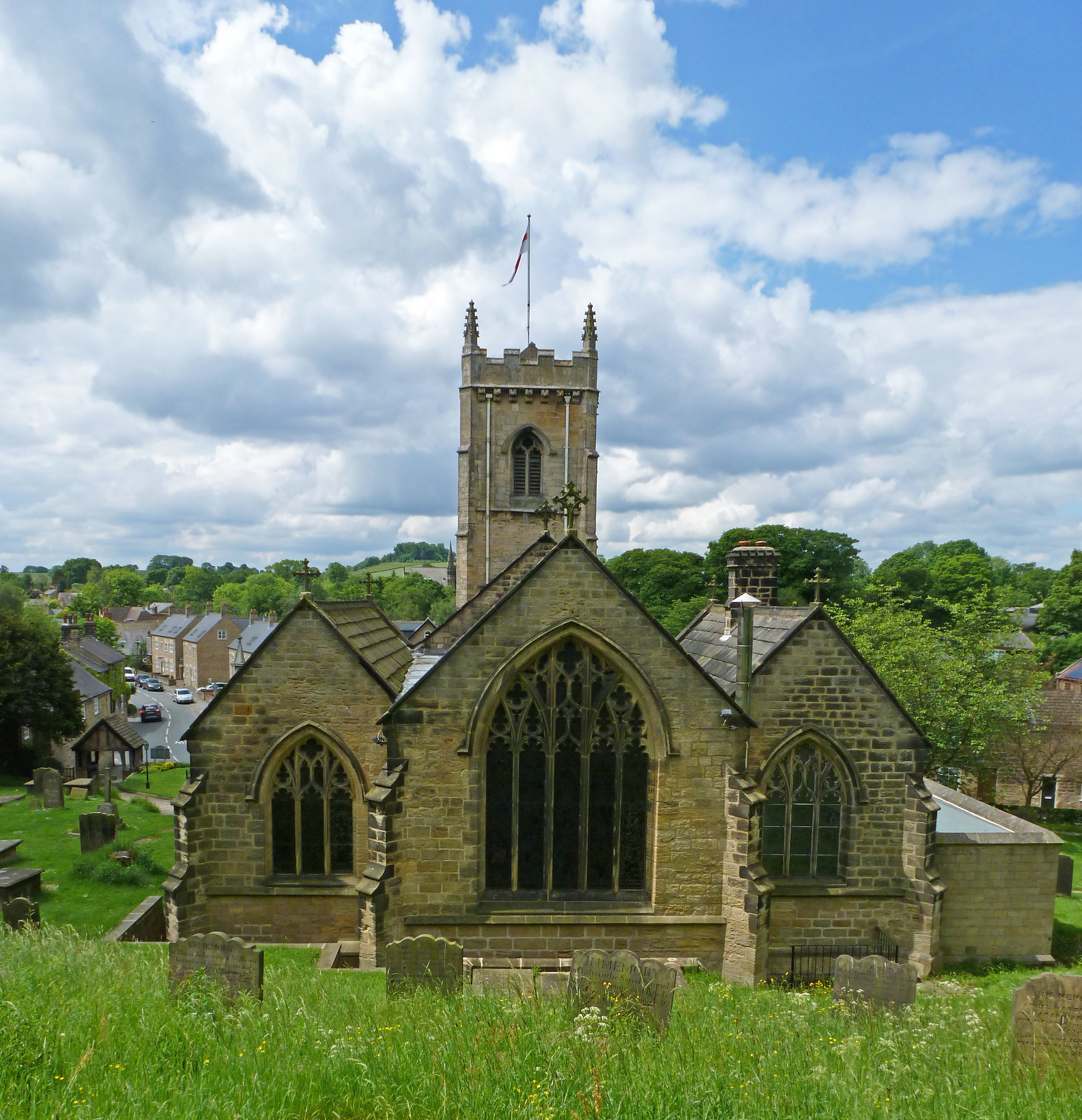
The south chapel, chancel and north chapel.

The church has a 15th-century tower; the rest of the church was largely reconstructed in 1855 by Mallinson and Healey.

== Architectural style ==
=== Exterior ===
The church has a limestone tower, a gritstone chancel and a stone slate roof. The church is of a perpendicular style with a west tower, a south porch and a chancel embraced by north and south chapels. The tower is of two stages with angled buttresses with offsets and an octagonal clock face.

=== Interior ===
The church has arched arcades with octagonal piers with moulded capitals. The north chapel has an organ. The south chapel has wall tablets and a heraldic memorial to John Savill of Coppley (c. 1677). The church is furnished with 19th century pews and choir stalls with carved poppyheads.

== See also ==
- List of places of worship in the City of Leeds
- Listed buildings in Thorner
