= Thorner =

Village and civil parish in West Yorkshire, England

Coordinates: 53.860329°N 1.424020°W

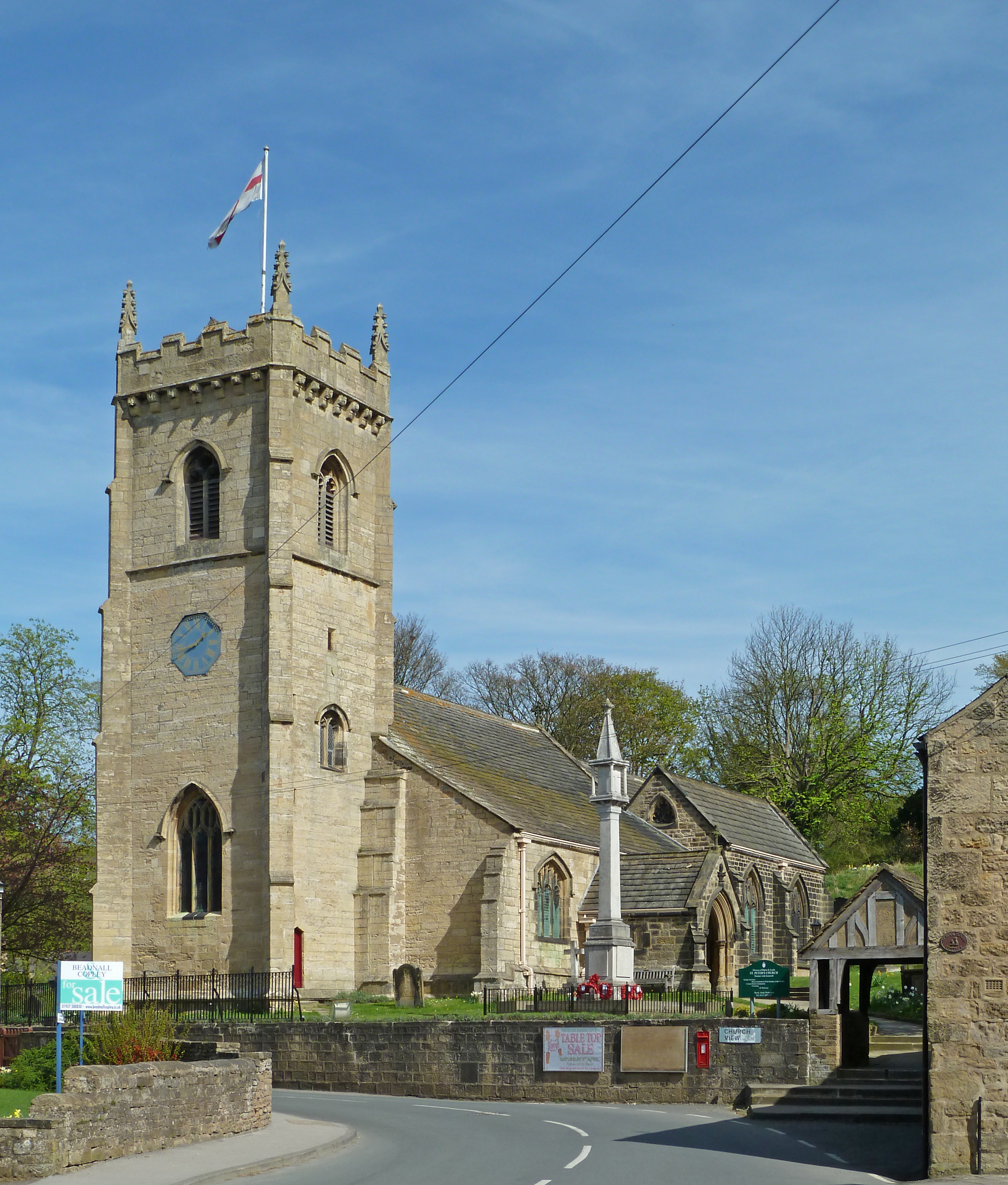
- St Peter's church

- Location within West Yorkshire
- Population: 1,646 (2011 census)
- OS grid reference: SE3798040610
- Civil parish: Thorner
- Metropolitan borough: City of Leeds
- Metropolitan county: West Yorkshire
- Region: Yorkshire and the Humber
- Country: England
- Sovereign state: United Kingdom
- Post town: LEEDS
- Postcode district: LS14
- Dialling code: 0113
- Police: West Yorkshire
- Fire: West Yorkshire
- Ambulance: Yorkshire
- UK Parliament: Wetherby and Easingwold

Thorner is a rural village and civil parish in the City of Leeds in West Yorkshire, England, located between Seacroft and Wetherby. It had a population of 1,646 at the 2011 Census.

== Etymology ==
The name of Thorner is first attested in the 1086 Domesday Book as Torneure, Tornoure and Tornoura. The name comes from the Old English words þorn ('thorn') and ofer ('bank, slope'), and thus meant "thorn bank".

The township and parish of Thorner also included Eltofts, whose name comes from the Old English masculine personal name Ella and the Old English word toft (itself borrowed from Old Norse topt), which meant 'curtilage, messuage, plot of land with a building'. Thus the name once meant 'Ella's plot of land'.

== History ==
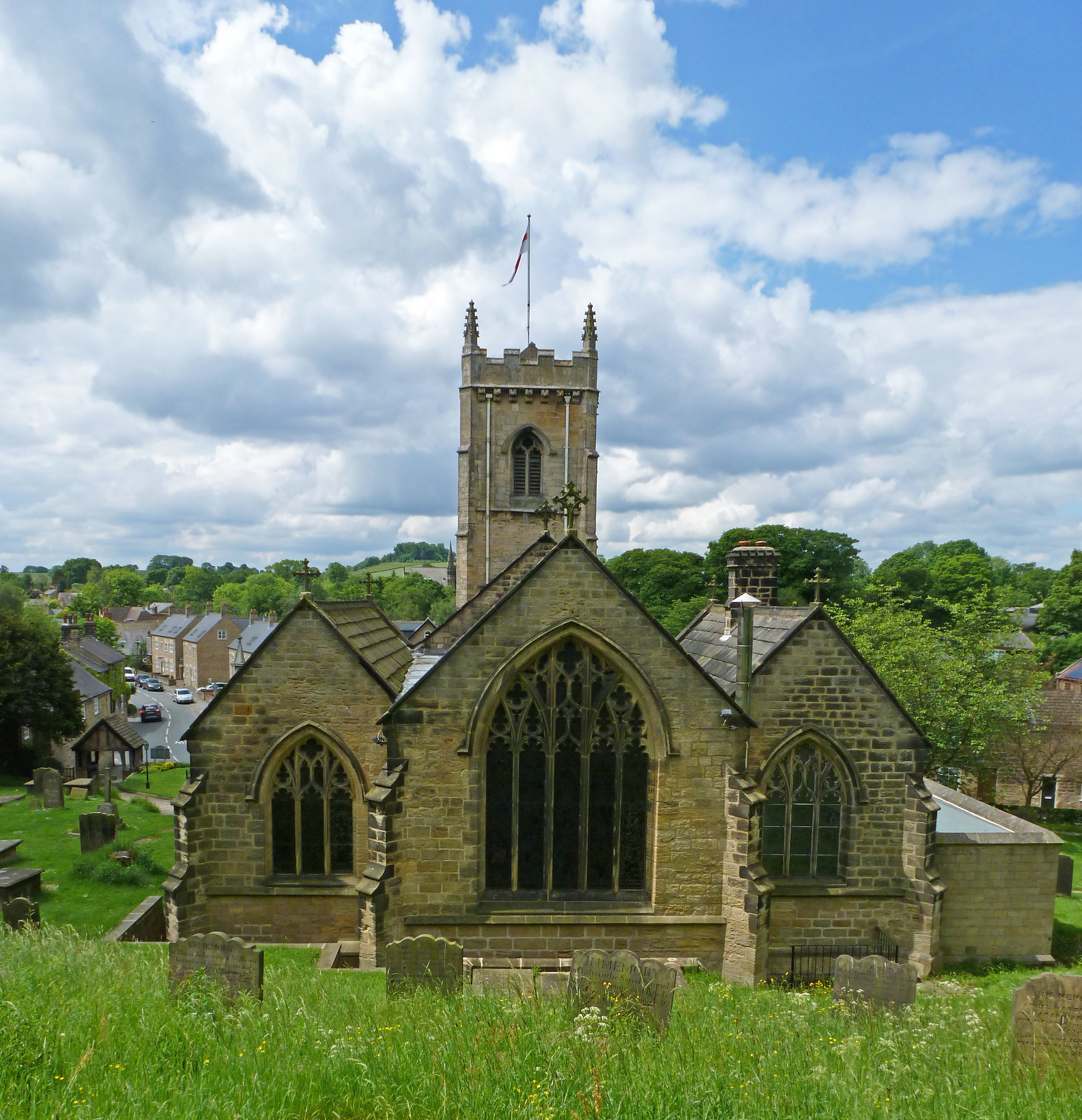
St Peter's Church

There is archaeological evidence of Bronze Age and Anglo-Saxon settlements, while the name St Osyth's Well, just west of the church, refers to a Viking Age saint.

The ancient parish of Thorner covered 4,400 acres (1,800 ha) in the wapentake of Skyrack in the West Riding of Yorkshire. The parish included the townships of Scarcroft and Shadwell, which became separate civil parishes in 1866.

In 1245 it acquired a market, and the area around Main Street shows a typical Medieval layout of strips leading from a market street. The base of a medieval market cross is on Butts Garth. As well as farming, pottery was a local industry in the Middle Ages, supplanted by the textile industry in the 18th and 19th centuries.

Thorner railway station (which also served nearby Scarcroft and was originally called Thorner & Scarcroft, opened 1876 and closed 1964 under the Beeching cuts and was demolished and the area developed into housing. It was on the Cross Gates to Wetherby Line, which thereby gave access to Leeds and Harrogate, with some services running between these two extremes. This resulted in an increase in housing and a more widespread distribution of agricultural and industrial products with a substantial number of shops. The end of the annual agricultural show in 1924 indicates the lesser importance of farming to the community. However, from the 1950s local businesses declined as the village population increasingly commuted to larger centres such as Leeds.

The former Bishop's House at Eltofts, to the west of Thorner, was the Dower House of the Earls of Mexborough.

In 1970 the main part was designated a Conservation Area by Leeds City Council: in 2009 the area was extended to include the area of Sandhills to the south. This has essentially limited industrial development and restricted new housing to the surroundings. Many of the properties on Main Street are listed buildings along with St Peter's Church (grade II).

The church of St Peter is built in the later English gothic style and has a square embattled tower. In the graveyard is the memorial to John Philips, who lived to 118 years. A school was built by subscription in 1787, and is now the Parish Centre. Two former Methodist churches in Thorner are now closed, the nineteenth-century former chapel having been converted to flats.

== Geography ==
Thorner is situated close to the A1, A58 and A64 trunk roads. It is 8 miles (13 km) north-east of Leeds city centre and 7 miles (11 km) to the south-west of Wetherby. The underlying rock is limestone, some of which was burnt into lime and flagstone and slates were quarried.

Travel to and from the village by public transport is via the number 7 bus route (operated by the Transdev Harrogate & District bus company). The journey takes roughly half an hour from Leeds, 20 minutes from Wetherby and an hour from Harrogate.

== Features ==
Thorner has no street lighting. The village has two public houses, the Mexborough Arms and The Fox. There is no longer a post office or a village shop, but there is a delicatessen, a hairdresser's and a restaurant, formerly The Beehive pub. Social amenities include the Parish Centre next to the church, the Victory Hall in Carr Lane, an over-60s centre, a bowling green, tennis courts and cricket and football pitches.

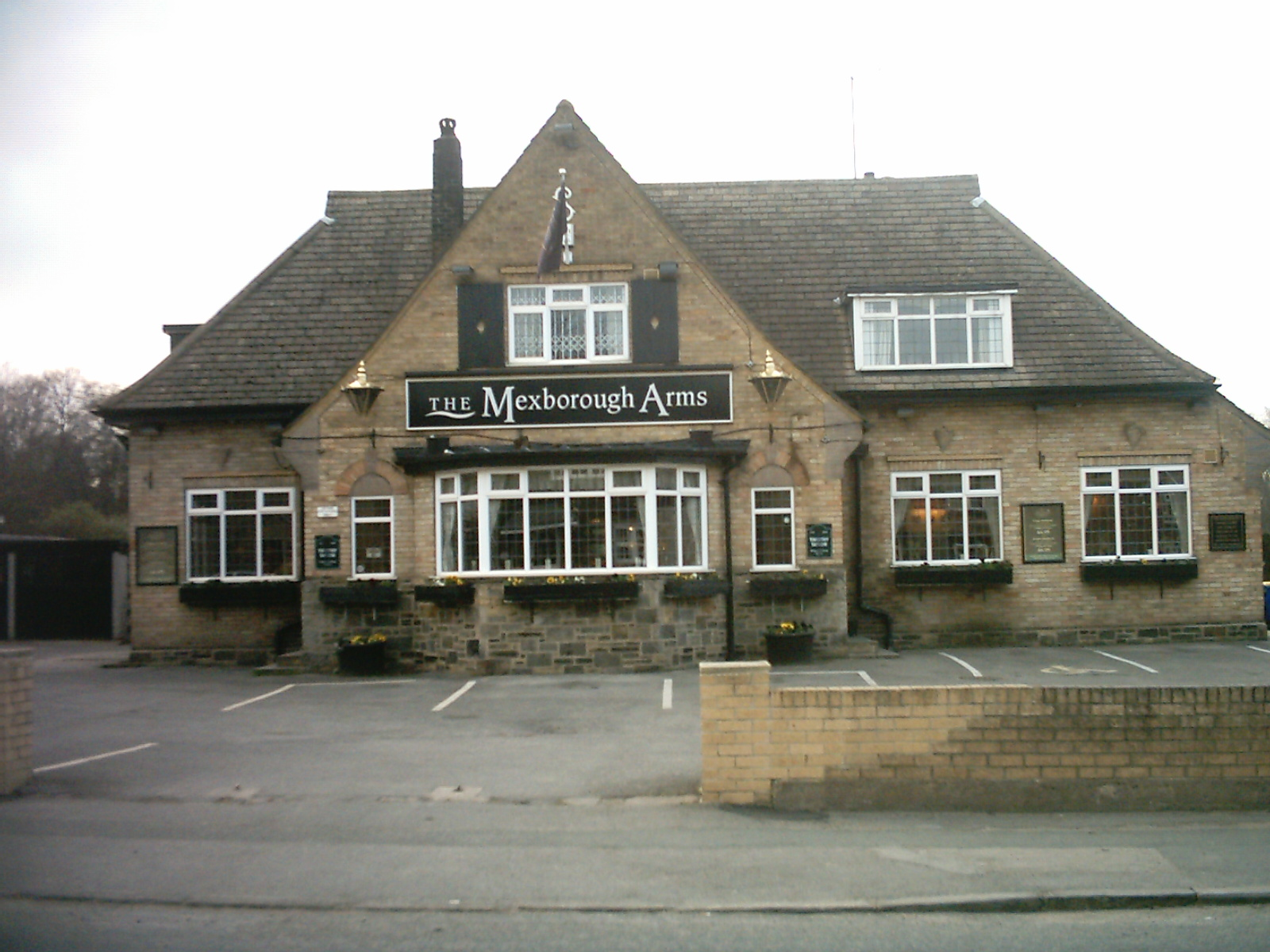
Mexborough Arms

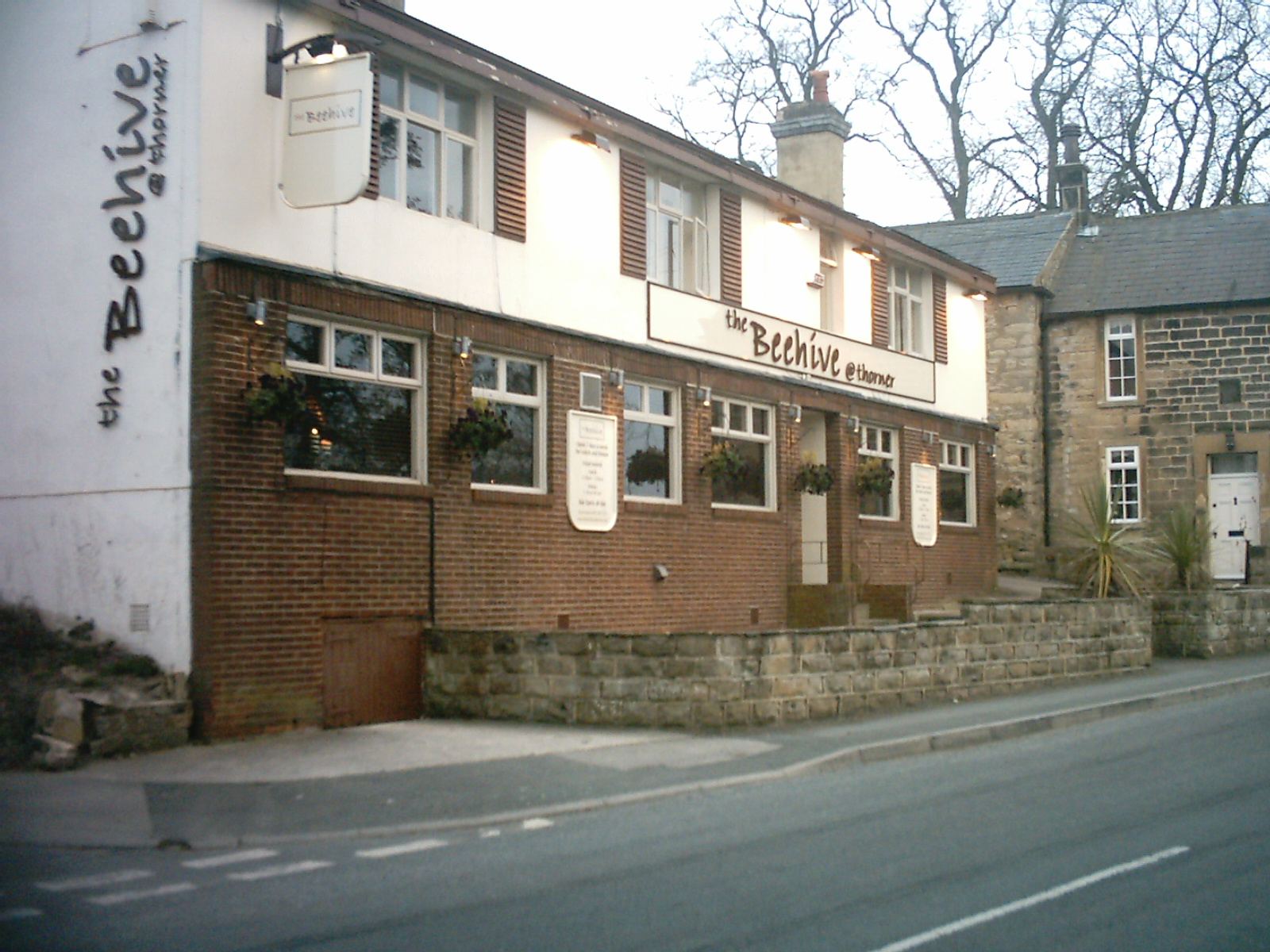
The Beehive

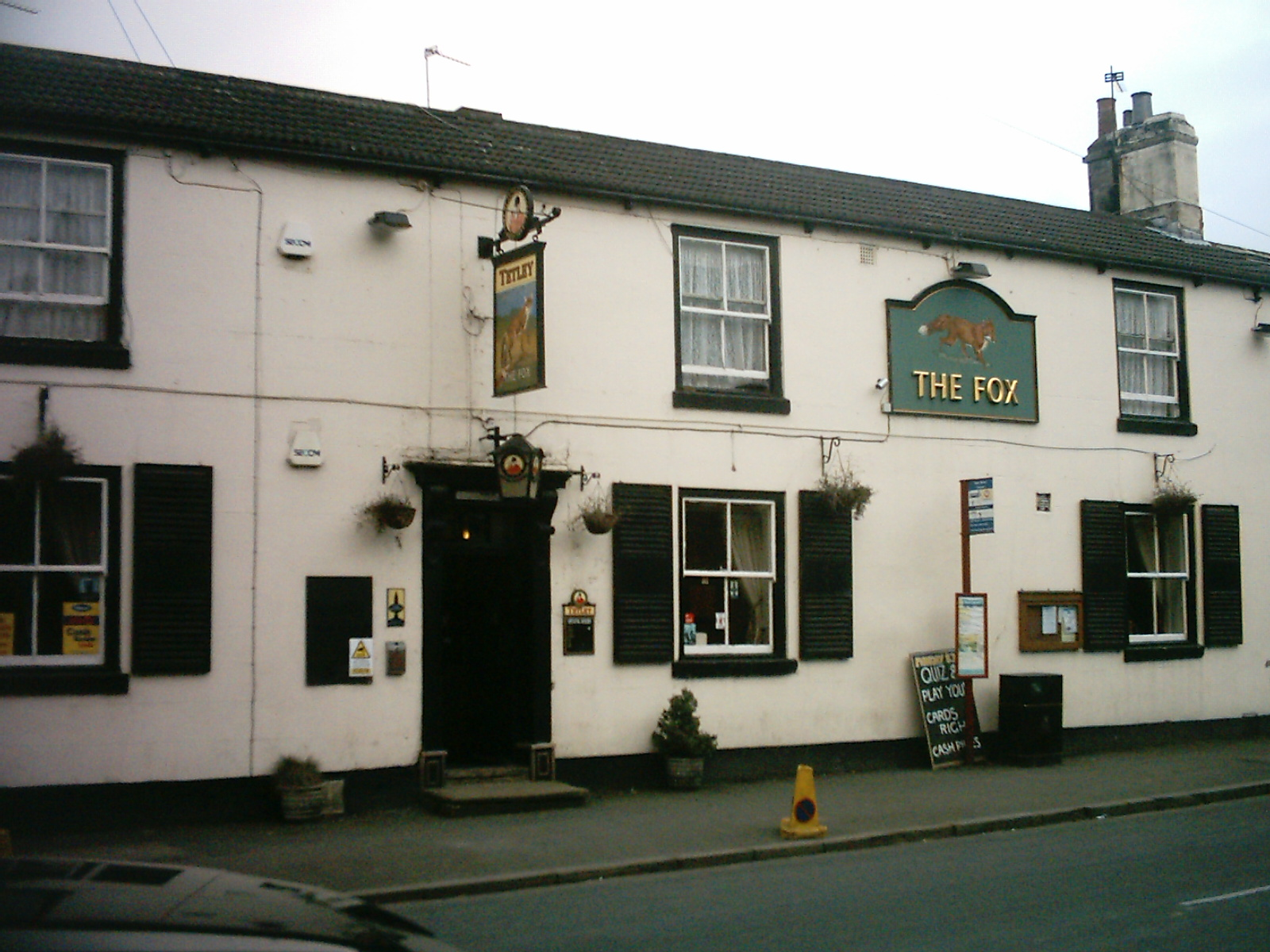
The Fox

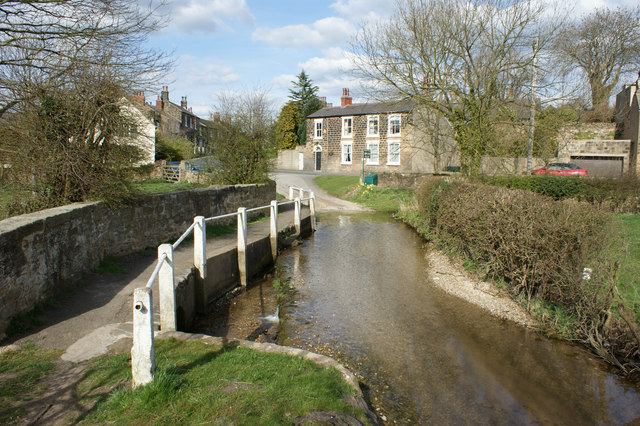
Thorner ford

== See also ==
- Listed buildings in Thorner
