= Stutton railway station =

Disused railway station in North Yorkshire, England

Stutton
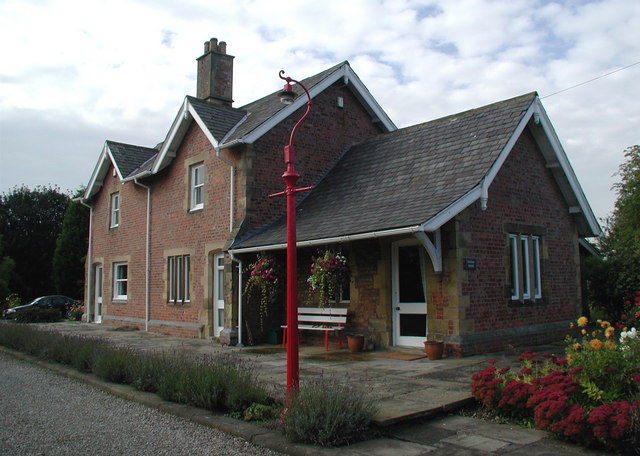
- The old station house at Stutton, now a private home

General information
- Location: Stutton, North Yorkshire; England
- Coordinates: 53.8690°N 1.2729°W
- Grid reference: SE4790941666
- Platforms: 2

Other information
- Status: Disused

History
- Original company: York and North Midland Railway to 1854
- Pre-grouping: North Eastern Railway 1854-1923
- Post-grouping: London and North Eastern Railway 1923-1948, British Railways (N.E region) 1948 to closure

Key dates
- 1847: Opened
- 1905: Closed to passengers
- 1964: Closed
Location

Stutton railway station was a railway station in Stutton, North Yorkshire, on the Harrogate to Church Fenton Line. The station opened on 10 August 1847 and closed to passenger traffic on 30 June 1905. It remained open to goods traffic until it closed completely on 6 July 1964.

The station master at Stutton in the 1890s was named Wilson Mortimer and his story, along with the traffic dealt with at this small station, is covered in a research paper.

The two-storey brick and sandstone station building was designed by George Townsend Andrews in the form of two side-by-side railway cottages. It was built on the up platform and is now used as a private residence. The roof of its single-storey northern extension was extended as a narrow canopy over the platform. The goods yard consisted only of one siding and a headshunt and had a cattle dock. A wooden signal box stood at the northern end of the station next to the level crossing with Weedling Gate. It was pulled down towards the end of the 1960s. Since the village that was served by the station was rather small, and Tadcaster station very close, passenger numbers remained low, causing the early closure to regular passenger services. Only chartered holiday trains occasionally called at Stutton afterwards.

== Lines ==
Preceding station	Disused railways	Following station
Church Fenton	North Eastern Railway; Harrogate to Church Fenton Line	Tadcaster; Line closed; station closed
