= Penda's Way railway station =

Disused railway station in West Yorkshire, England

Penda's Way
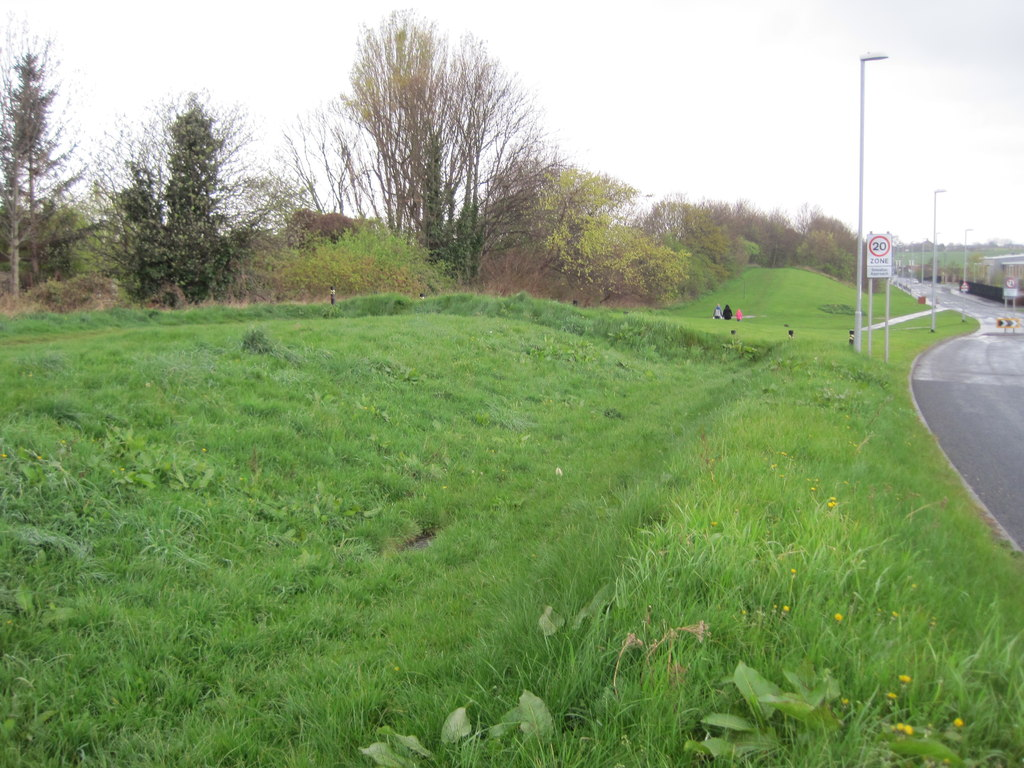
- Site of the station in 2012

General information
- Location: Cross Gates, City of Leeds; England
- Coordinates: 53.8118°N 1.4374°W
- Grid reference: SE 371 352
- Platforms: 2

Other information
- Status: Disused

History
- Post-grouping: LNER until 1948, BR (N.E region) 1948 to closure

Key dates
- 1939: Opened
- 1964: Closed
Location

Penda's Way railway station was a railway station on the Cross Gates–Wetherby line at the eastern edge of Cross Gates in West Yorkshire. The station opened on 5 June 1939 to serve a new housing estate and was named after a nearby battle where King Penda was killed. The station was named by Gertrude Bray, a local builder and politician who was responsible for developing the housing estate it served. It closed on 6 January 1964 together with the line and has been demolished entirely.

The station was intended to serve the increasing commuter traffic in the area. Its platforms, which were both 120 yards (110 m) long, and the waiting rooms, had been constructed of wood. A lattice footbridge connected the northern ends of the platforms. The station was staffed and handled parcels as well as baskets of homing pigeons, but it had no freight facilities.

== Lines ==
| Preceding station | Disused railways | Following station |
|---|---|---|
| Cross Gates | London and North Eastern Railway; Cross Gates to Wetherby Line | Scholes; Line closed; station closed |
