= Cross Gates–Wetherby line =

Former railway line in Yorkshire, England

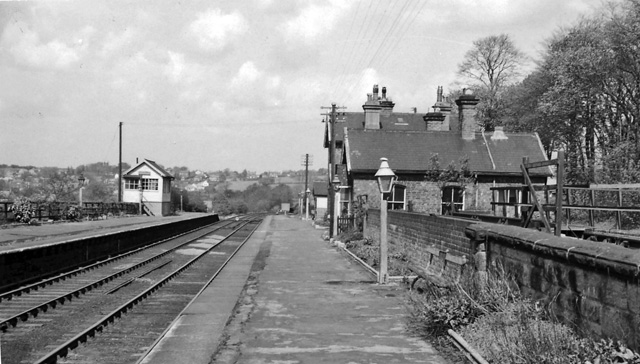
- Bardsey Station

Overview
- Status: Closed
- Locale: West Yorkshire
- Termini: Cross Gates North Junction; Wetherby East Junction
- Stations: 6

Service
- Type: Heavy rail
- Operator(s): North Eastern Railway to 1923, London and North Eastern Railway 1923-1948, British Railways (N.E region) 1948 to closure

History
- Opened: 1 May 1876
- Closed: 6 January 1964 (Passengers), 4 April 1966 (Goods)

Technical
- Line length: 12 mi (19 km)
- Number of tracks: double
- Track gauge: 4 ft 8 1/2 in (1,435 mm) standard gauge
- Highest elevation: 371 ft (113 m)

The Cross Gates–Wetherby line is a former railway line in West Yorkshire, England, between Cross Gates, near Leeds, and Wetherby. The line opened 1876 and closed 1964.

== History and description ==
Construction began in 1871, with the work contracted to Thomas Nelson of Carlisle. Works on the line included over a dozen cuttings, and a similar number of embankments, with the cutting between Thorner and Scarcroft being 40 feet (12 m) deep with a volume of 1,370,000 cubic yards (1,050,000 m^{3}); the largest bridge on the line was over the River Wharfe with twin spans of 120 feet (37 m) with a central pier of two cast iron columns.

The line ran from Cross Gates East Junction east of Cross Gates railway station on the Leeds and Selby Railway, to Wetherby (Linton Road) railway station, then connecting at a junction (later East junction) on the Harrogate to Church Fenton Line at west of Wetherby (York Road) railway station.

The 12 miles (19 km) from Cross Gates to Wetherby took four years to construct and it was opened on 1 May 1876. The line was doubled in 1901 and a new south-west curve was built at Wetherby; running from West junction to North junction, forming a wye junction north and west of both the Wetherby stations.

The line closed to passengers on 6 January 1964.

== Stations ==
- Penda's Way
- Scholes
- Thorner
- Bardsey
- Collingham Bridge
- Wetherby
