= Manston railway station (Yorkshire) =

Disused railway station in Manston, Leeds

Manston

General information
- Location: Manston, West Yorkshire; England
- Coordinates: 53.8056°N 1.4398°W
- Grid reference: SE369345

Other information
- Status: Disused

History
- Original company: Leeds and Selby Railway
- Pre-grouping: York and North Midland Railway; North Eastern Railway

Key dates
- 22 September 1834: Opened
- 9 November 1840: Closed
- November 1850: Reopened
- 1 April 1869: Closed
Location

Manston railway station served the suburb of Manston, West Yorkshire, England, from 1834 to 1869 on the Leeds and Selby Railway.

== History ==
The station was opened on 22 September 1834 by the Leeds and Selby Railway. It closed on 9 November 1840 but reopened in November 1850, before closing permanently on 1 April 1869.

Preceding station	Historical railways	Following station
Cross Gates; Line and station open	Leeds and Selby Railway	Garforth; Line and station open
