= Listed buildings in Thorner and Wothersome =

Thorner and Wothersome are civil parishes in the metropolitan borough of the City of Leeds, West Yorkshire, England. The parishes contain 34 listed buildings that are recorded in the National Heritage List for England. All the listed buildings are designated at Grade II, the lowest of the three grades, which is applied to "buildings of national importance and special interest". The parishes contain the village of Thorner, the area of Wothersome, and the surrounding countryside. Most of the listed buildings are houses and associated structures, the majority along Main Street of Thorner. The others include a cross base and shaft, a church and a grave slab in the churchyard, a former church and attached Sunday school, a farmhouse, farm buildings, a road bridge, and a milestone.

== Buildings ==
Name and location	Photograph	Date	Notes
Cross-base and shaft 53.85729°N 1.42591°W		Late medieval	The cross base is in limestone and is octagonal with chamfered corners. The shaft dates probably from the 18th century, it is short, in gritstone, and has a circular plan.
Barn, Manor Farm; 53.86028°N 1.42697°W	—	Late medieval	The barn has a timber framed core, encased in stone, with some later brick patching, quoins, and an asbestos roof. There are seven bays, and an aisle. The barn contains doorways, a cart entry, and stable doors.
St Peter's Church; 53.85969°N 1.42397°W		15th century	The tower and some masonry in the body of the church are the oldest parts, and the rest was rebuilt by Mallinson and Healey in 1855. The early parts are in limestone, the later parts in gritstone, and the roof is in stone slate. The church is in Perpendicular style, and consists of a nave, north and south aisles, a south porch, a chancel with north and south chapels, and a west tower. The tower has angle buttresses, a south arched doorway, and an embattled parapet on a corbel table, and corner pinnacles.
Grave slab 53.85964°N 1.42413°W	—	c. 1503	The grave slab in the churchyard of St Peter's Church, adjacent to the church, is in stone, and broken into two pieces. On the slab is an incised cross and a marginal inscription.
30 Main Street; 53.85778°N 1.42779°W	—	Late 16th century	A timber framed house, later encased in stone, with a stone slate roof. There are two storeys, three bays, and a rear outshut. The doorway is approached by a double flight of steps, and has a monolithic lintel, and the windows are sliding sashes with three lights.
59 Main Street; 53.85665°N 1.42930°W	—	17th century	The house, which has been much altered, is rendered and pebbledashed, and has a stone slate roof. There are two storeys, two bays, and a single-storey rear outshut. In the ground floor are two doorways, one blocked, and casement windows, and the upper floor contains sliding sashes. Above the ground floor openings is a continuous moulded hood mould.
6 Main Street; 53.85890°N 1.42603°W	—	Late 17th century	The house was refronted in the 19th century. It is in stone with quoins, and a hipped stone slate roof. There are two storeys and an L-shaped plan, with a front range of four bays, and a rear wing. The doorway on the front has an architrave and a fanlight, and the windows are sashes with architraves and monolithic lintels cut with false voussoirs. At the rear, external steps lead up to a doorway with composite jambs, and there are mullioned windows.
26 Main Street; 53.85813°N 1.42727°W	—	Late 17th century	A house, workshop and shop that has been altered. It is in stone, rendered on the front, on a plinth, and has a Welsh blue slate roof with coped gables. There are two storeys, an irregular plan, and four bays, the right bay with a passage. In the ground floor are two doorways, one with a fanlight, and a shop front, the window with four arched lights, corner pilasters, an entablature and a cornice, and a doorway to the left. The windows on the front are sashes, and in the left return is a blocked two-light mullioned window.
Stream Cottage; 53.85570°N 1.43092°W	—	Early to mid 18th century	A house, later divided, it is in painted stone with a pantile roof. There are two storeys, three bays, and a rear one-storey two-bay outshut. Most of the windows are sliding sashes with chamfered surrounds, there is one mullioned window, and eaves dormers.
1 and 3 Church Hill; 53.86082°N 1.42423°W	—	18th century	A house and a cottage in rendered stone on a chamfered plinth, with quoins and a stone slate roof. There are two storeys, three bays, and a single-storey rear wing. The doorways have plain surrounds, and most of the windows are sliding sashes.
Mexborough Farm barn and outbuilding 53.85918°N 1.42613°W	—	Mid 18th century	The barn and outbuilding are in stone with a stone slate roof, and they form an L-shaped plan. The barn has three bays, and contains quoins, segmental-arched cart entries with composite jambs and voussoirs, and rectangular vents. The outbuilding, at right angles, has two storeys and three bays. External steps lead to a first-floor doorway with monolithic jambs and a lintel with a keystone, and there are three similar doorways in the ground floor.
Beaulieu Cottage; 53.85458°N 1.42999°W	—	1771	A stone house with quoins, and a Welsh blue slate roof with a coped gable and kneelers on the right. There are two storeys and three bays. The doorway has a raised surround and a fanlight, with a date plaque above. The windows are 20th-century small-pane casements with raised surrounds, those in the left bay narrower.
The Bishop's House; 53.85681°N 1.44908°W	—	c. 1775	A former dower house, it is in stone, and has a Welsh blue slate roof with coped gables and kneelers. There are two storeys and attics, three gabled bays, a three-bay wing on the left, and a two-bay house at the rear. The central doorway has pilasters, a frieze and a cornice, and the central gable is shaped. The windows are sashes with architraves. The wing has a hipped roof and the windows have wedge lintels. At the rear is an arched stair window.
Coach house east of Bishop's House; 53.85680°N 1.44877°W	—	c. 1775	The former coach house and associated buildings are in stone with a hipped Welsh blue slate roof. There are two storeys, and they form an L-shaped plan, with ranges of two and three bays. The openings include two segmental-arched carriage entrances, sash windows and doorways, some with wedge lintels cut with false voussoirs.
23 Main Street; 53.85807°N 1.42687°W	—	Late 18th century	A stone house on a plinth, with quoins, moulded gutter brackets, and a Welsh blue slate roof. There are two storeys and two bays. Steps lead up to the doorway that has an architrave, an entablature and a moulded cornice, and above it is a plaque in an architrave. The windows on the front are sliding sashes with flat arches and voussoirs. At the rear is a doorway with monolithic jambs, and an arched stair window, and the other windows have wedge lintels cut with false voussoirs.
28 Main Street; 53.85799°N 1.42746°W	—	Late 18th century	A stone house on a rendered plinth, with quoins, and a tile roof. There are two storeys and three bays. Steps lead up to a doorway with tie-stone jambs, and the windows have monolithic lintels and narrower monolithic jambs.
Bridge east of Bridge House; 53.85342°N 1.43073°W	—	Late 18th century (probable)	The bridge carries Lower Sandhills over a Mill Beck. It is in stone, and consists of two small semicircular arches. The bridge has a band and a coped parapet, and ends in projecting square piers.
Kirkfield Cottage; 53.86093°N 1.42042°W	—	Late 18th century	A stone house with quoins and a stone slate roof. There are two storeys, two bays, and a rear wing. The doorway has monolithic jambs and a fanlight. The windows are sashes, with monolithic jambs and deep lintels.
Northolme; 53.86043°N 1.42402°W	—	Late 18th century	A house and attached outbuilding in stone, with quoins and a pantile roof. The house has three storeys and a symmetrical front of three bays. The central doorway has a round-arched head, imposts, a fanlight, and a triple keystone, and the windows are sashes. The outbuilding has two storeys and one bay, and contains a former taking-in door with tie-stone jambs, a segmental-arched cart entry with voussoirs, blocked and converted into a doorway, another doorway and fixed windows.
20 and 22 Main Street; 53.85825°N 1.42711°W	—	c. 1800	A pair of mirror-image stone cottages on a plinth, with quoins on the right, and a stone slate roof. There are two storeys and a symmetrical front of two bays. Steps lead up to the paired central doorways that have monolithic jambs, imposts, fanlights, archivolts, and keystones. The windows have wedge lintels cut with false voussoirs.
39 Main Street; 53.85725°N 1.42830°W	—	Early 19th century	A house and a shop, later combined into a house, it is in stone with a stone slate roof. There are two storeys and three bays. The two doorways have monolithic jambs, and the left doorway has an architrave. The windows are small-pane sliding sashes, with wedge lintels and keystones cut with false voussoirs.
65 Main Street; 53.85618°N 1.43005°W	—	Early 19th century	A stone house on a plinth, with quoins and a stone slate roof. There are two storeys and a symmetrical front of three bays. Steps lead up to a central doorway with base blocks, monolithic jambs, an archivolt, and a triple keystone, with a keyed oculus above. The windows are sashes with architraves and wedge lintels cut with false voussoirs.
Garden wall, 66 Main Street; 53.85665°N 1.42972°W	—	Early 19th century	The garden wall is in stone with coping. At the front it is low with curved coping, and ends in square rusticated piers with arched caps. The side walls are taller, and the coping is ramped to the front piers. To the right is a short length of wall with two entrances and rusticated piers.
Clairville; 53.85606°N 1.43012°W	—	Early 19th century	A stone house that has a Welsh slate roof with coped gables and kneelers. There are two storeys and a symmetrical front of three bays. Steps lead up to the central doorway that has an architrave, a fanlight, a frieze, and a moulded cornice. The windows are sashes with wedge lintels.
Kenilworth Cottage; 53.85671°N 1.42987°W	—	Early 19th century	The house is in gritstone, and has a roof of Welsh blue slate with coped gables and kneelers. There are two storeys, a double depth plan, and a symmetrical front of three bays. The central doorway has an architrave, a fanlight, a frieze, a moulded cornice, and a blocking course. The windows are sashes, the window above the doorway has an architrave, and those in the outer bays have thin monolithic lintels.
The Laurels; 53.85757°N 1.42769°W	—	Early 19th century	A stone house with gutter brackets and a Welsh blue slate roof. There are two storeys and a symmetrical front of three bays. Steps lead up to the central doorway that has tie-stone jambs and a fanlight, and the windows are sashes with wedge lintels cut with false voussoirs.
35 Main Street; 53.85749°N 1.42783°W	—	Early to mid 19th century	A stone house on a plinth with a pantile roof. There are two storeys and a symmetrical front of two bays. Two steps lead up to the central doorway that has monolithic jambs and a fanlight. The windows have wedge lintels cut with false voussoirs.
68 and 70 Main Street; 53.85641°N 1.43026°W	—	Early to mid 19th century	A pair of stone cottages with a stone slate roof, two storeys and five bays. The central paired doorways have monolithic jambs. Most windows have wedge lintels, on the left a doorway has been converted into a window, and on the right is an inserted window.
72 Main Street; 53.85634°N 1.43026°W	—	Early to mid 19th century	A stone house with quoins, a parapet with a cornice and blocking course, and a stone slate roof. There are two storeys and a symmetrical front of three bays. The central doorway has base blocks, joweled jambs, a fanlight, and a cornice on consoles. The windows have been altered to small-pane upper casements.
Windsor House; 53.85672°N 1.42921°W	—	Early to mid 19th century	A stone house with a Welsh blue slate roof. There are two storeys and an attic and a symmetrical front of three bays, the coped gable with kneelers facing the street. The outer bays contain doorways with architraves and fanlights, between them is a segmental bow window with an architrave, and the other windows are sashes.
Wothersome Grange Farmhouse; 53.87705°N 1.39396°W	—	Early to mid 19th century	The farmhouse is in stone with oversailing eaves and a hipped Welsh blue slate roof. There are two storeys and sides of three bays. The central doorway has a fanlight, and the windows are sashes.
Field Head; 53.84378°N 1.44334°W	—	c. 1840	A large house, later used for other purposes, it is in stone and has a Welsh blue slate roof with coped gables and finials. There are two storeys and attics, a double depth plan, a front of three gabled bays, and a rear wing. The porch contains an arched doorway with a hood mould, flanked by octagonal columns with tall finials, and between these is a parapet pierced by ovals. The central gable is shaped, it has a ball finial, and contains a lozenge-shaped window. The windows are sashes and in the left return is a two-storey canted bay window.
Milestone; 53.85403°N 1.46245°W		Mid 19th century	The milestone is on the east side of the A58 road and is in stone with a cast iron overlay. It has a triangular section and a rounded top. On the top is inscribed "LEEDS & COLLINGHAM ROAD" and "THORNER", and on the sides are the distances to Collingham, Leeds and Wetherby.
Methodist Church and Sunday School; 53.85881°N 1.43095°W		1877–78	The church and Sunday school, later converted for residential use, are in stone with a Welsh blue slate roof, and are in Gothic Revival style. The church has a northwest tower and a southwest staircase projection. The tower is square at the base and broaches to octagonal at the bell stage, with a spire that has gargoyles at the junction. There are angle buttresses rising to squat pinnacles. The tower and staircase projection contain arched doorways, and to the left of the staircase projection is a buttress with a small spirelet. The attached Sunday school has six bays and a basement, and coped gables.
