= Wetherby (Linton Road) railway station =

Disused railway station in West Yorkshire, England

Wetherby
- The station entrance sign

General information
- Location: Wetherby, City of Leeds; England
- Coordinates: 53.9301°N 1.3967°W
- Grid reference: SE407486
- Platforms: 4 (2 through, 2 dock)

Other information
- Status: Disused

History
- Original company: North Eastern Railway
- Pre-grouping: North Eastern Railway
- Post-grouping: London and North Eastern Railway; British Railways (N.E. region)

Key dates
- 1 July 1902: Station opened as Wetherby
- 6 January 1964: Station closed
Location

Wetherby railway station was built on the North Eastern Railway's Cross Gates to Wetherby Line on Linton Road. It replaced an earlier station on York Road which had opened on 1 May 1876.

After the construction of a double track line to allow through trains from Leeds to Harrogate via Wetherby, York Road station closed and Wetherby's new station opened in 1902. It closed to passenger traffic on 6 January 1964 and to goods on 4 April 1966 under the Beeching axe.

== Background ==
Wetherby declined as a coaching town after the opening of York Road station on the Harrogate to Church Fenton Line by the York and North Midland Railway on 10 August 1847. Economic damage was caused by the railway as no rail link was made between Wetherby and the major trading and commercial centre, Leeds. A railway line to Leeds became one of the first campaigns of the Wetherby News. Two Wetherby businessmen; Henry Crossley and James Coates exerted pressures on the railway companies.

The first proposal for a railway between Wetherby and Leeds was put forward in 1863 by the London and North Western Railway from its terminus in Leeds to Wetherby, the Vale of York to Hartlepool. The plan never came to fruition. It forced the North Eastern Railway Company to propose a railway line to prevent its rival encroaching into its heartland. In 1866 NER was given powers to build a line between Leeds and Wetherby although the route was undecided. Crossley and Coates again campaigned to prevent the line being cancelled.

The branch between Wetherby (York Road) and Cross Gates opened on 1 May 1876 as a single-track line linking the Leeds to Selby and Harrogate to Church Fenton lines. The junction at Wetherby only faced towards Church Fenton which meant that the Cross Gates branch was little used for Harrogate services. Improvements were made between 1897 and 1902 which saw the line doubled and a south-to-west curve installed to form a triangular junction facing Wetherby. Its opening led to residential development in the town. A new station to replace York Road station was opened at Linton Road near Wetherby South Junction at the southern apex of the new junction on 1 July 1902. The works were part of a plan to open the Leeds-Wetherby-Harrogate-Northallerton route for express services.

== Station ==
The ticket booths after the station was closed

The station was similar in appearance to Menston station, with its stone buildings on one platform and an iron footbridge. The front originally had a sheltered entrance.

At the eastern end of the station was the Devils Toenail Junction, where the line forked to Harrogate or Church Fenton making up one corner of the triangular junction. The junction was in a cutting with walls of buff-coloured Magnesian Limestone in which fossils can be found. It is still known to some locals as the Devils Toenail.

In 1932, there were four Leeds-Wetherby-Harrogate weekday services and twelve stopping services to Wetherby, with most services continuing to Tadcaster and Church Fenton. For a while a Leeds-Scarborough route ran through Wetherby station. The line went into decline under British Railways despite dieselisation in 1958, eliminating the problem of trackside fires. By the end of 1963, Leeds to Wetherby services had been reduced to four on weekdays together with an extra service on Saturdays. At the same time, long-distance passenger services had increased, with two overnight services being transferred to the line in 1959 and during 1961–1963 two Newcastle to Liverpool diesel expresses each way used the route.

== Closure ==
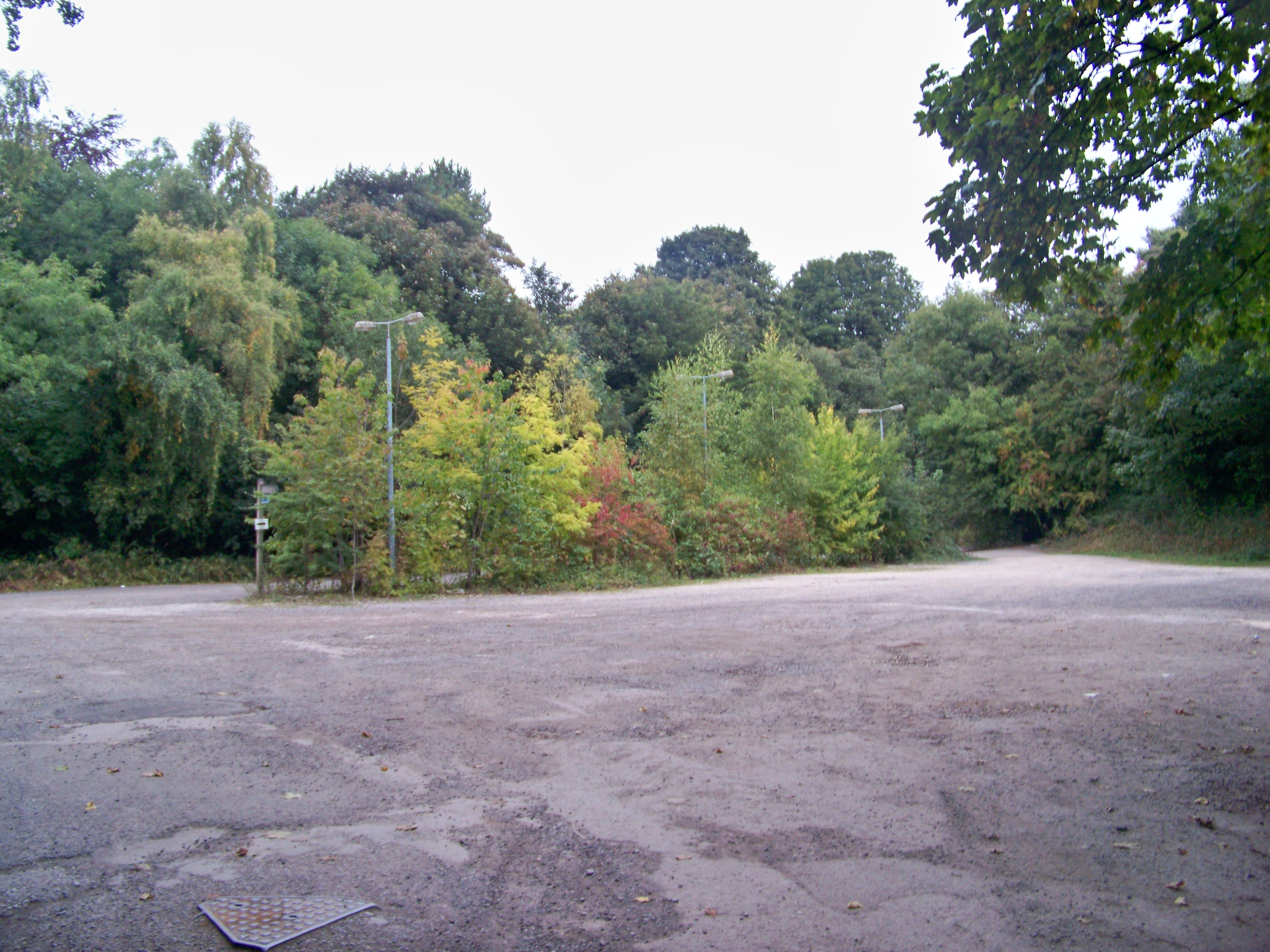
The site of Wetherby (Linton Road) railway station in 2009

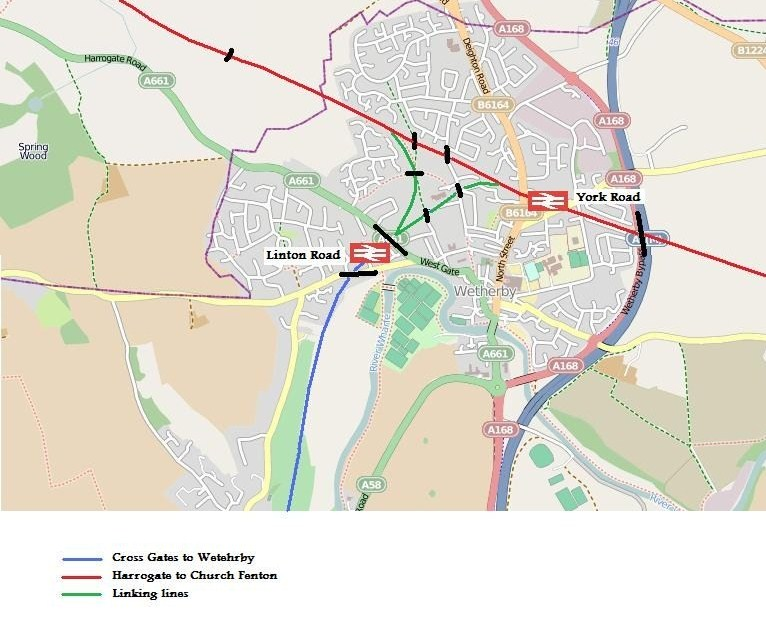
Location of railway infrastructure in Wetherby

In March 1963, the Beeching report was published which called for the withdrawal of passenger services on the Leeds-Wetherby-Harrogate and Church Fenton-Wetherby lines and the closure of their stations. The lines were the first to be closed under Beeching's plans. A headline, "First Lamb to the Beeching slaughter", mentioned that "No Regular Passengers Object at Inquiry", which was the case for only the Church Fenton line. A decision was reached on 24 October 1963 after a three-month enquiry.

The axe fell on 6 January 1964 for passenger services on both lines, although goods traffic continued on the Cross Gates line for a further four months until 27 April 1964. Goods services on the Church Fenton survived until 4 April 1966.

At the time of the Beeching enquiry, there were no more than eight passengers on the one train a day between Church Fenton and Harrogate via Wetherby and no regular passengers. The route had originally been of strategic significance, linking the East Coast Main Line with Harrogate. After the line via Knaresborough was built, most passengers to and from Harrogate no longer used this route.

There were more passengers on the Leeds to Wetherby route but only six southbound and four northbound trains stopped each day and competition from bus services made passenger numbers unsustainable despite the increase in commuters living in Wetherby.

All stations were staffed, as were 16 signal boxes and three level crossings requiring 35 staff, the line had steep gradients requiring banking engines and it was considered uneconomical having an operating cost of £57,000 pa compared to receipts of £9,000.

Through freight traffic via Wetherby was costly and slow because of steep gradients and became uneconomical following the quadrupling of the track between Thirsk and York in 1959. The original twenty freight paths between Harrogate and Wetherby (in each direction) fell to five by 1960. Local freight consisted largely of house coal, the use of which was declining.

Preceding station	Disused railways	Following station
Collingham Bridge; Line and station closed	LNER; Cross Gates to Wetherby Line	Terminus

== Post-closure ==
By 1966 the track had been lifted and the waiting rooms on the Harrogate bound platform were demolished. By the 1970s the tracks had been filled to platform level but the main station buildings remained in a dilapidated state. In 1971 the site was used for the filming of an episode of Follyfoot, the buildings were demolished shortly afterwards.

Plans to relieve road congestion in the town centre and on the A58 and A661 roads by converting the disused railway lines into relief roads never came to fruition.

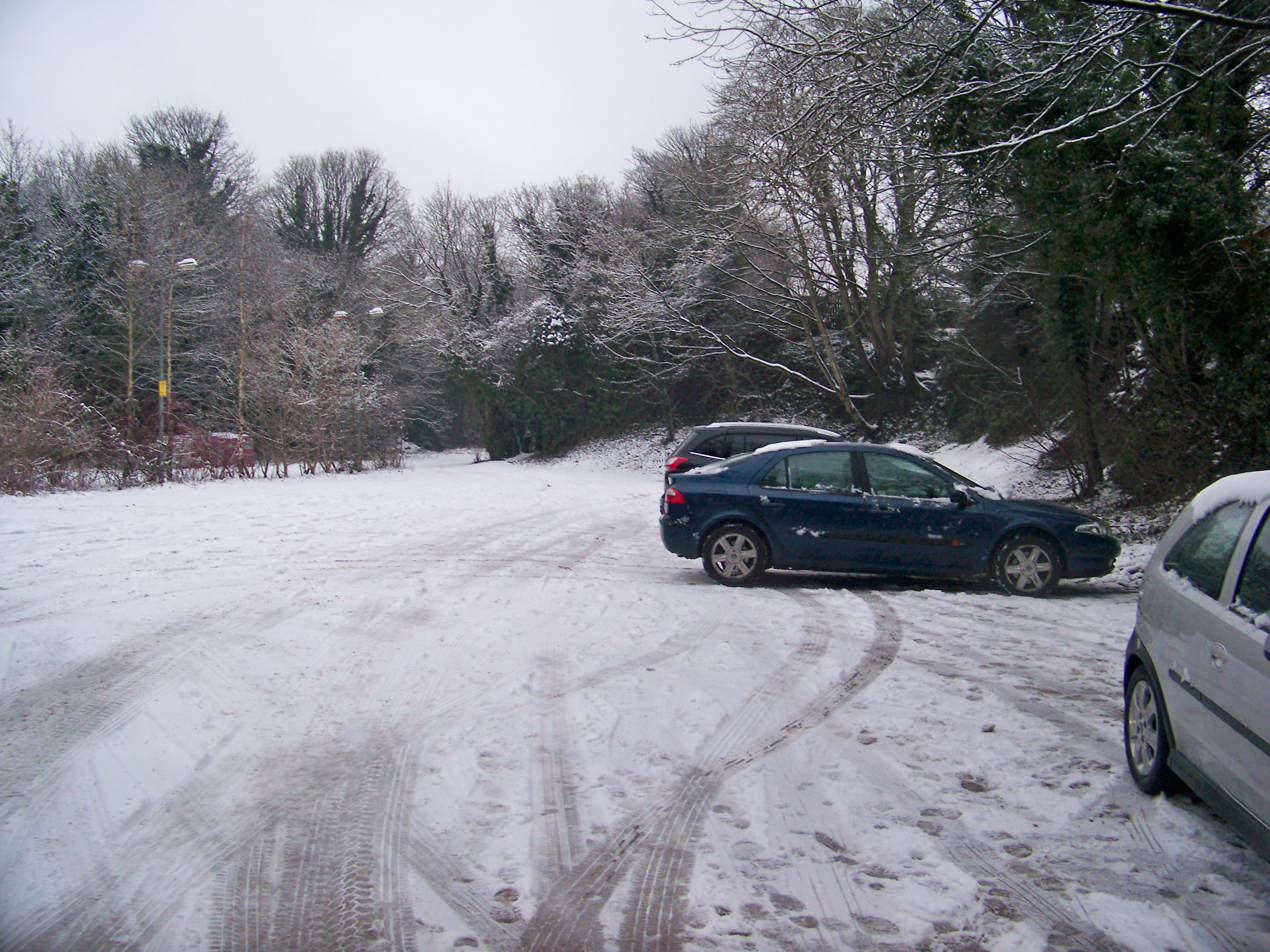
The snow-covered undeveloped site in January 2013

The pedestrian entrance remains near the bridge on the A661, with the original gate and nameboard brackets. The bridges on either side of the station bear a notice issued by British Rail in 1987 stating that the trackbed still belongs to British Rail. Line side markers remain dotted about the old trackbed. Following closure, the station site was used as a car park.

Part of the trackbed between Wetherby and Leeds has been used for housing development. Sustrans National Cycle Network routes 66 and 67 use part of the track bed from Wetherby to Priest Hill which opened in 1992, and the "devil's toenail" triangle, which was completed by the Wetherby and District Lions Club in summer 1993. In 2003 Leeds City Council continued the cycle track to Thorp Arch. The track is part of a proposed link between Harrogate and York. It passes through open farmland and deep wooded cuttings that provide a range of habitats for wildlife and pass some sites of industrial archaeology.

The Cross Gates to Wetherby line is protected as far as Scholes in Leeds City Council's Unitary Development Plan, although no project to re-open the line has emerged. A small stretch has been built on in Linton and Bardsey so reconstruction would be expensive and require either the demolition of properties or re-routing. The bridge over the River Wharfe at Collingham has been demolished. Campaign for Better Transport support the re-opening of the routes from Wetherby to Harrogate and Leeds.

== Sources ==
- Beeching, Richard (1963). "The Reshaping of British Railways" (PDF). HMSO.
- Butt, R. V. J. (October 1995). The Directory of Railway Stations: details every public and private passenger station, halt, platform and stopping place, past and present (1st ed.). Sparkford: Patrick Stephens Ltd. ISBN 978-1-85260-508-7. OCLC 60251199. OL 11956311M.
- Clinker, C. R. (1988) [1978]. Clinker's Register of Closed Passenger Stations and Goods Depots in England, Scotland and Wales 1830–1980 (2nd ed.). Bristol: Avon-Anglia Publications & Services. ISBN 978-0-905466-91-0. OCLC 655703233.
- Hurst, Geoffrey (1991). Register of Closed Railways 1948–1991. Milepost Publications. ISBN 0-947796-18-5.
- Quick, Michael (2009) [2001]. Railway passenger stations in Great Britain: a chronology (4th ed.). Oxford: Railway & Canal Historical Society. ISBN 978-0-901461-57-5. OCLC 612226077.
- Rogers, James (2000). The Railways of Harrogate and District. Manchester: North Eastern Railway Association. ISBN 978-1873513330.
- Skelsey, Geoffrey (January 2009). "First lamb to the Beeching slaughter". Backtrack. 23 (213).
- Suggitt, Gordon (2007). Lost Railways of South & West Yorkshire. Newbury, Berkshire: Countryside Books. ISBN 978-1-84674-043-5.
- Unwin, Robert W. (1987). Wetherby: The History of a Yorkshire market town. Headingley: Leeds University Press. ISBN 0-951196-80-4. OCLC 16122414.
