= Wetherby (York Road) railway station =

Disused railway station in West Yorkshire, England

Wetherby
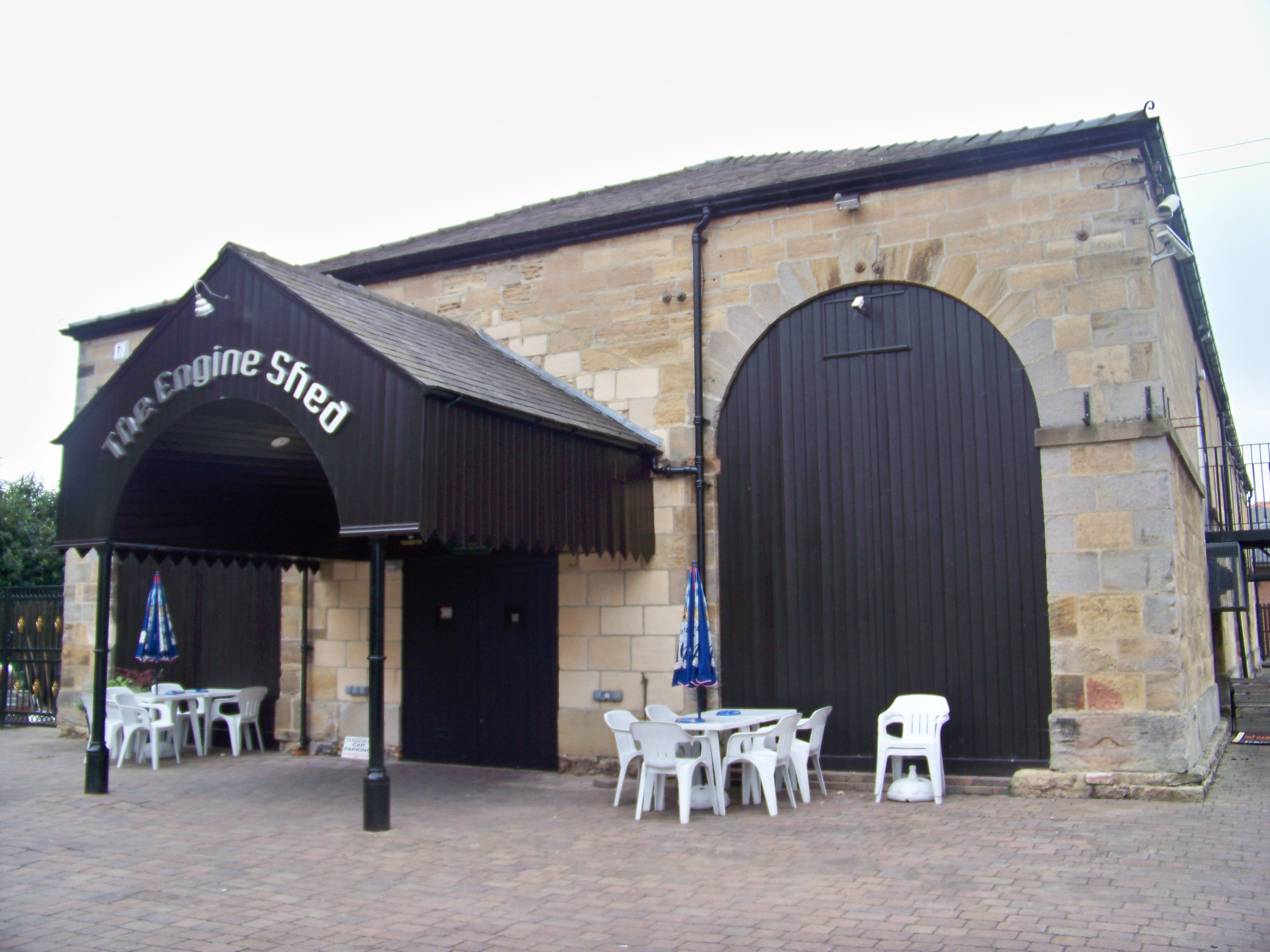
- Goods shed near the former station site

General information
- Location: Wetherby, City of Leeds; England
- Coordinates: 53.9328°N 1.3810°W
- Grid reference: SE406487
- Platforms: 2 through,

Other information
- Status: Disused

History
- Original company: York and North Midland Railway to 1854
- Pre-grouping: North Eastern Railway 1854–1923
- Post-grouping: London and North Eastern Railway 1923–1948, British Railways (N.E region) 1948 to closure

Key dates
- 1847: opened
- 1902: closed for passengers
- 1964: closed for goods
Location

Wetherby railway station was a station serving the town of Wetherby in West Yorkshire, England. It was first built on the York and North Midland Railway Company's Harrogate to Church Fenton Line and the station was situated on York Road. The goods shed remains, situated off York Road, and is now a dance venue.

The Harrogate to Church Fenton Line was augmented by the Cross Gates to Wetherby Line, which was opened on 1 May 1876.

After construction of a double track allowing through trains from Leeds to Harrogate via Wetherby, the York Road station closed for passengers and Wetherby's new station was opened in 1902 on Linton Road. This station remained operational as a goods station until closure under the Beeching axe in 1964.

== History ==
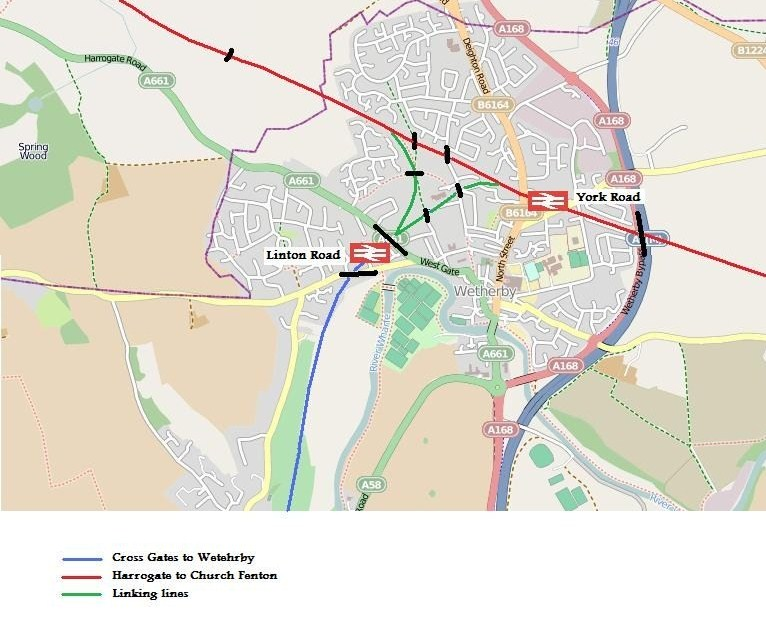
The locations of railway stations and the infrastructure in Wetherby

Until the opening of the Church Fenton to Harrogate Line which brought the railway to Wetherby, the nearest station was at Bolton Percy to which a daily coach operated from the Angel public house. The opening of these north–south railways caused Wetherby economic harm as it took much traffic off the Great North Road; the 1839 toll income from the Ferrybridge-Wetherby-Boroughbridge turnpike was £2,400, but within a few years it had fallen to £1,400.

The Church Fenton-Tadcaster-Wetherby-Spofforth section of the line opened on 10 August 1847, with the final stretch to Harrogate opening on 20 July 1848. The station which was located on York Road was somewhat to the North East of the town at the time and consequently saw less usage than it might have otherwise and employed fewer people; in the 1851 census a porter was listed while by 1871 a porter and station master were both listed. Comparably the station on Linton Road in its heyday had around seven staff. To compensate for the distance from the town by the 1850s every train arriving in Wetherby was met by a coach from the Angel.

The introduction of the rail service further eroded the towns main coaching inns (the Swan and Talbot and the Angel) as local transport centres. Despite this the number of inns in the town remained almost unchanged from sixteen in 1837 to fifteen by 1861. Despite this, many innkeepers were forced to seek supplementary incomes including an agricultural machinist (Blacksmiths Arms), carrier (Crown Inn), wheelwright (Fox Inn), purveyor of wines and spirits (Red Lion), farmer (White Hart) and a blacksmith (White Horse). The coming of the railway dented Wetherby's importance as a coaching town greatly. What's more, the town wasn't to get the crucial rail link to Leeds until 1876.

Preceding station	Historical railways	Following station
Spofforth; Line and station closed	London and North Eastern Railway; Harrogate to Church Fenton Line	Wetherby Racecourse; Line closed; station closed
