= Scholes railway station =

Disused railway station in West Yorkshire, England

Scholes
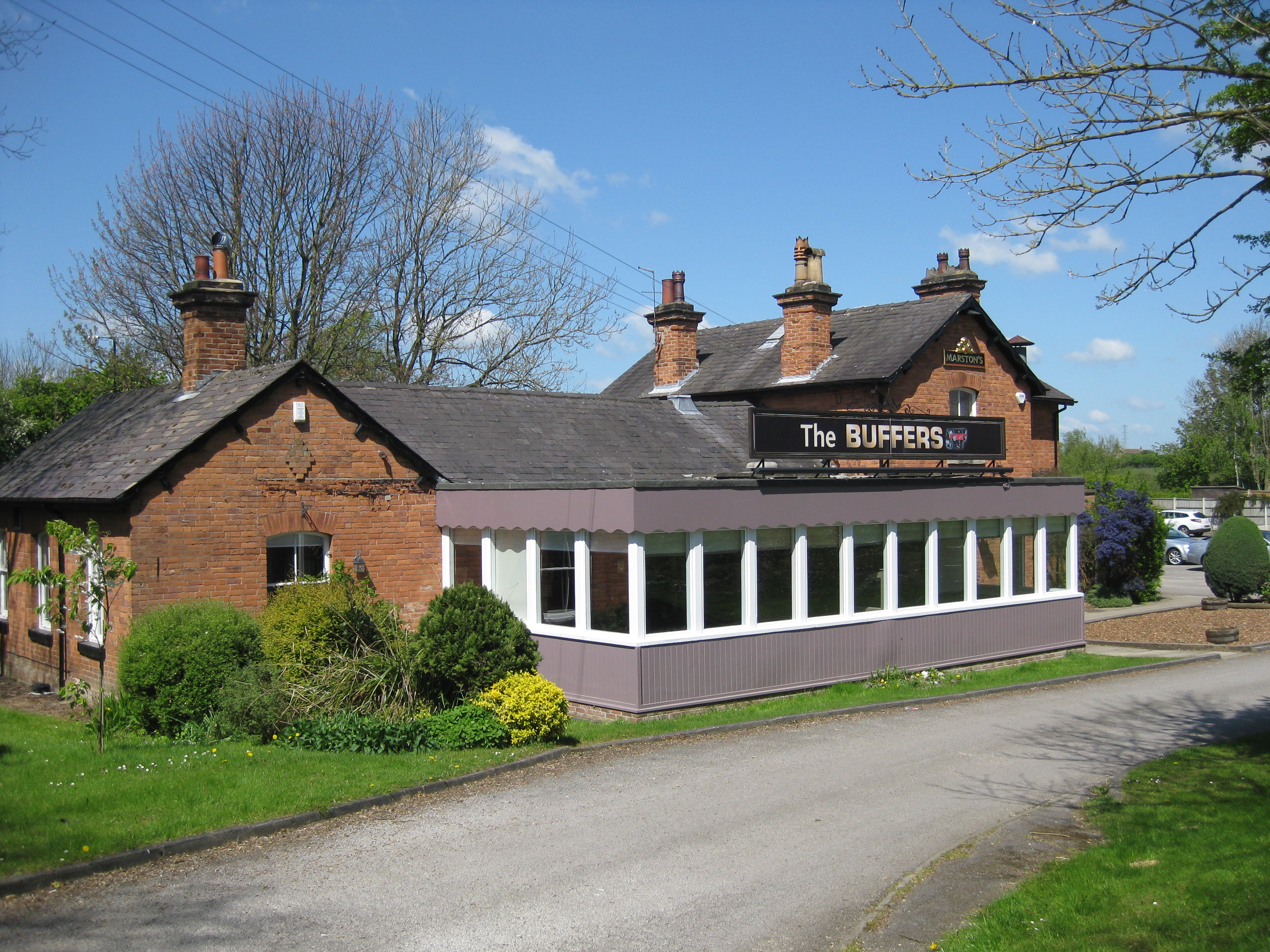
- The former station building, now used as a restaurant

General information
- Location: West Yorkshire, City of Leeds; England
- Coordinates: 53.8306°N 1.4303°W
- Grid reference: SE374373
- Platforms: 1 (until 1901), 2 (1901 to closure)

Other information
- Status: Disused

History
- Original company: North Eastern Railway
- Post-grouping: London and North Eastern Railway until 1948; British Railways (N.E region) 1948 to closure

Key dates
- 1876: Opened
- 1964: Closed
Location

Scholes railway station was a station in Scholes, Leeds, West Yorkshire, England, on the Cross Gates–Wetherby line. It opened on 1 May 1876 and closed on 6 January 1964. The former station building is now a restaurant, which from 1984 to 1999 used a Mk 1 railway carriage as extra rooms. The latter is now restored and in use on the Keighley and Worth Valley Railway.

When opened, the station had a single platform and a brick station building on the up side of the line. The building was of a typical North Eastern Railway design, similar to those at Bardsey, Thorner, and Collingham Bridge as well as at Garforth station. A long siding was located opposite the platform, but there was no passing loop. The small goods yard with two sidings was located north of the station. One siding with a loop served the coal drops, the other a cattle dock. There was no goods shed or crane, only a parcels shed on the platform.

The local brickworks, established in 1877 by Isaac Chippindale Sr. close to the station, were a main freight customer, but were not permitted their own sidings and had to transport their products to the station by road. Upon doubling of the line in 1901, a second platform with a wooden waiting room was built, and a third goods siding added. In the 1950s the road bridge across the tracks south of the station was reconstructed. While the station closed to passengers on 6 January 1964, it remained open for goods until 27 April 1964. The stationmaster ran a coal sale as a private concern under licence from the railways. Following closure, the business continued from the former goods yard and later moved to Garforth. It closed upon the retirement of the last stationmaster in 1993. The station building was leased to an electrical contractor in the late 1960s and converted into a restaurant in 1979.

== Lines ==
Preceding station	Disused railways	Following station
Penda's Way; Line closed; station closed	London and North Eastern Railway; Cross Gates to Wetherby Line	Thorner; Line closed; station closed
