= Tadcaster railway station =

Disused railway station in North Yorkshire, England

Tadcaster
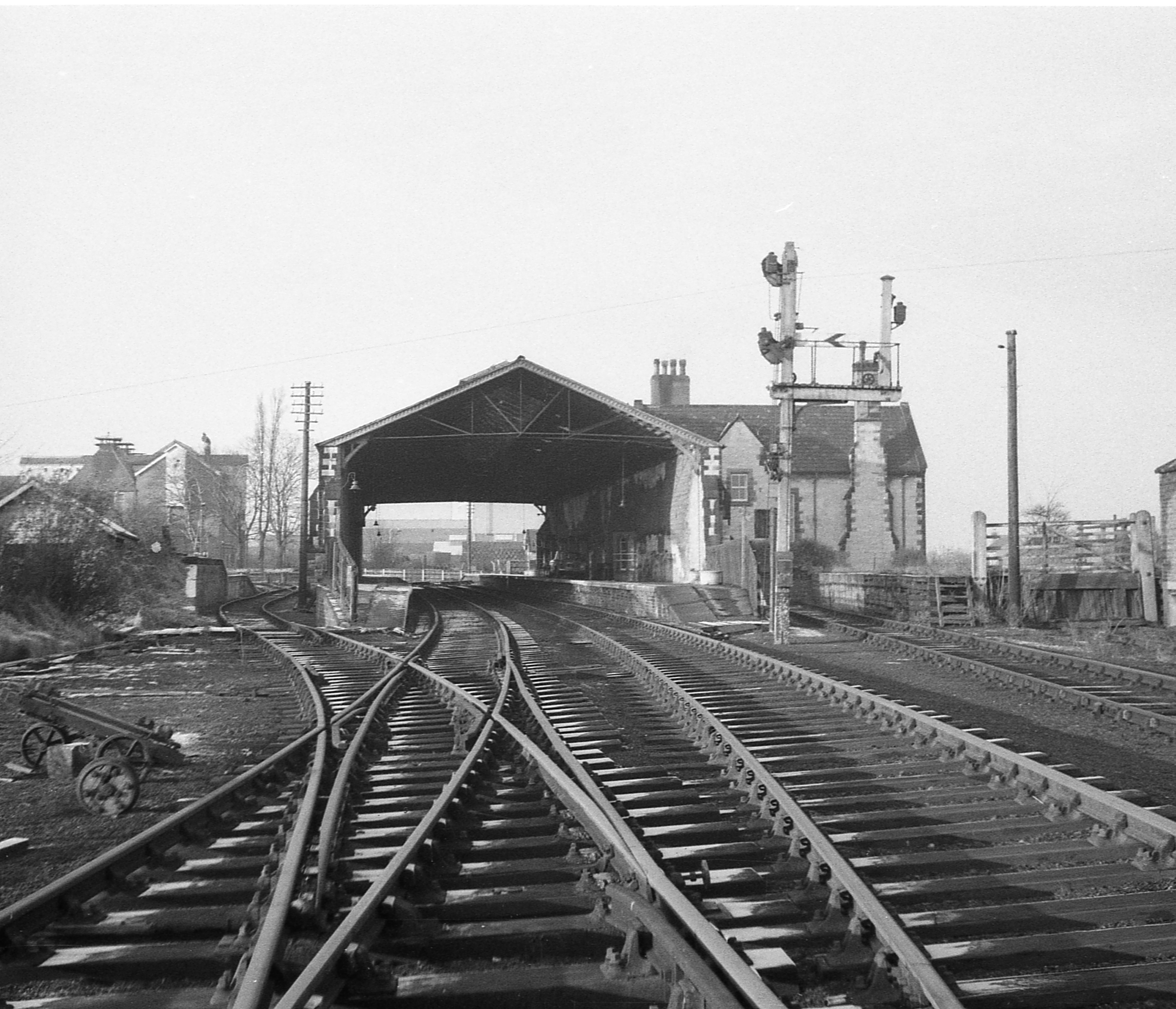
- Tadcaster station after closure in 1967

General information
- Location: Tadcaster, North Yorkshire; England
- Coordinates: 53.8832°N 1.2697°W
- Grid reference: SE482432
- Platforms: 2

Other information
- Status: Disused

History
- Original company: York and North Midland Railway to 1854
- Pre-grouping: North Eastern Railway 1854–1923
- Post-grouping: London and North Eastern Railway 1923–1948, British Railways (N.E region) 1948 to closure

Key dates
- 1848: Opened
- 1964: Closed to passengers
- 1966: Closed to freight
- 1971: Dismantled
Location

Tadcaster railway station was on the Harrogate to Church Fenton Line in Tadcaster, North Yorkshire, England.

== History ==
The station opened in 1848 as part of the Harrogate to Church Fenton Line of the York and North Midland Railway. Another line from Copmanthorpe to Cross Gates was authorised in 1846 and would have joined the line from Harrogate just north of Tadcaster station, but this project failed after the construction of the viaduct across the River Wharfe; earthworks marking the proposed line are still visible running eastward parallel with the A659 past what is now the Gallows Hill estate, but the only line laid was a short goods spur across the viaduct to a corn mill near the site of the modern-day Sainsbury's supermarket, adjacent to Tadcaster Bridge. This short branch line is marked as still extant on the 1947 New Popular Edition Ordnance Survey map. The viaduct is now crossed by a public footpath.

Unlike other railway stations on the line, Tadcaster had fully enclosed platforms under a single station canopy. The station building was designed by G. T. Andrews in Gothic style. A lattice footbridge connected the platforms. There were two signal boxes. The northern one controlled the level crossing north of the station and some private sidings beyond it, the southern one which appears to have been closed and dismantled by 1909 controlled the goods yard tracks. The goods yard signal box was unusual in that it contained a Ransomes & Rapier "Hayrake" lever frame, which is now preserved at the North Tyneside Steam Railway. The station had a goods office, a goods shed, and an adjacent water tower. Malt houses, breweries, and a flour mill were major freight customers. Much of the passenger traffic resulted from special trains for the students of Tadcaster Grammar School; the number of advertised passenger services was low.

During the 1870s Tadcaster Station was served by six timetabled passenger services in each direction on Mondays to Saturdays (there were no Sunday trains), but by the 1950s there was only one daily passenger train toward Harrogate and one toward Church Fenton. The station closed to passenger traffic on 6 January 1964; goods traffic ended on 30 November 1966. The site was bought by Tadcaster Rural District Council and, after obtaining permission in 1971, it was completely demolished, with some of the stonework being reclaimed for new housing in the town.

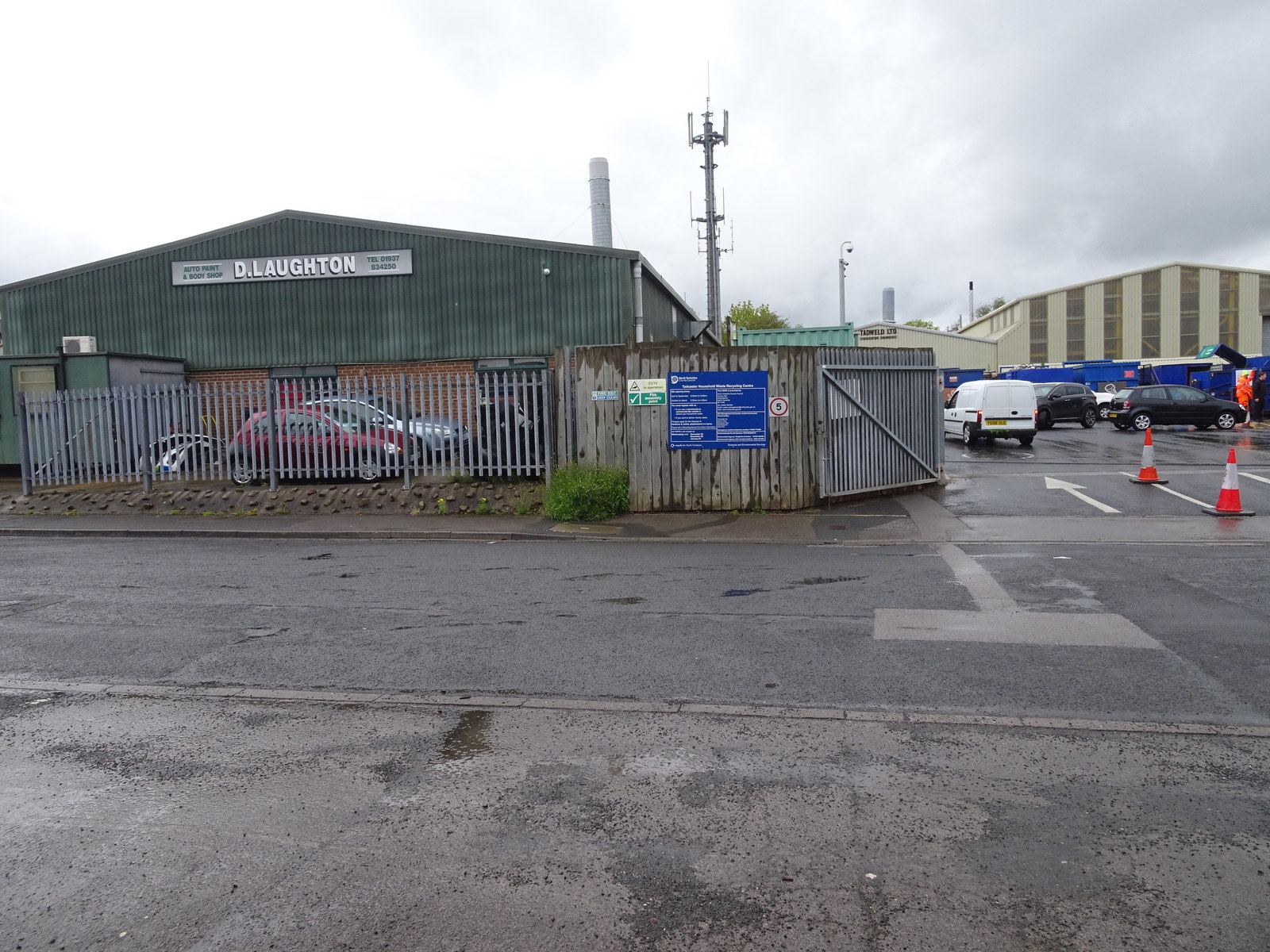
Site of Tadcaster station seen in 2019

Nothing now remains of the station and the site now forms part of an industrial estate just off Station Road with much of the trackbed in the area now largely removed, built on or integrated into the fields which it used to run over. Part of the trackbed is still visible over a bridge over the River Wharfe at nearby Boston Spa.

Sustrans are/were maintaining the line from Thorp Arch northwards past the site of the former Wetherby Racecourse Station to just short of the site of the former Wetherby (Goods) Station.

Preceding station	Disused railways	Following station
Stutton; Line closed; station closed	Harrogate to Church Fenton Line	Newton Kyme; Line closed; station closed

== See also ==
- Tadcaster Viaduct
