= Collingham Bridge railway station =

Disused railway station in West Yorkshire, England

Collingham Bridge
- Collingham Bridge station, August 1959

General information
- Location: Collingham, City of Leeds; England
- Coordinates: 53.9112°N 1.4105°W
- Grid reference: SE387462
- Platforms: 2

Other information
- Status: Disused

History
- Original company: North Eastern Railway
- Pre-grouping: North Eastern Railway
- Post-grouping: London and North Eastern Railway; British Railways (N.E. region)

Key dates
- 1 May 1876: Opened
- 6 January 1964: Closed
Location

Collingham Bridge railway station was a railway station serving the villages of Collingham and Linton in West Yorkshire, England. The station opened on 1 May 1876, and closed on 6 January 1964. The station's coal yard is now a car park for the River Wharfe with the location for the original station much further to the South West, aligning with the current Linton Road.

== Lines ==
Preceding station	Disused railways	Following station
Bardsey; Line closed; station closed	LNER; Cross Gates to Wetherby Line	Wetherby; Line closed; station closed

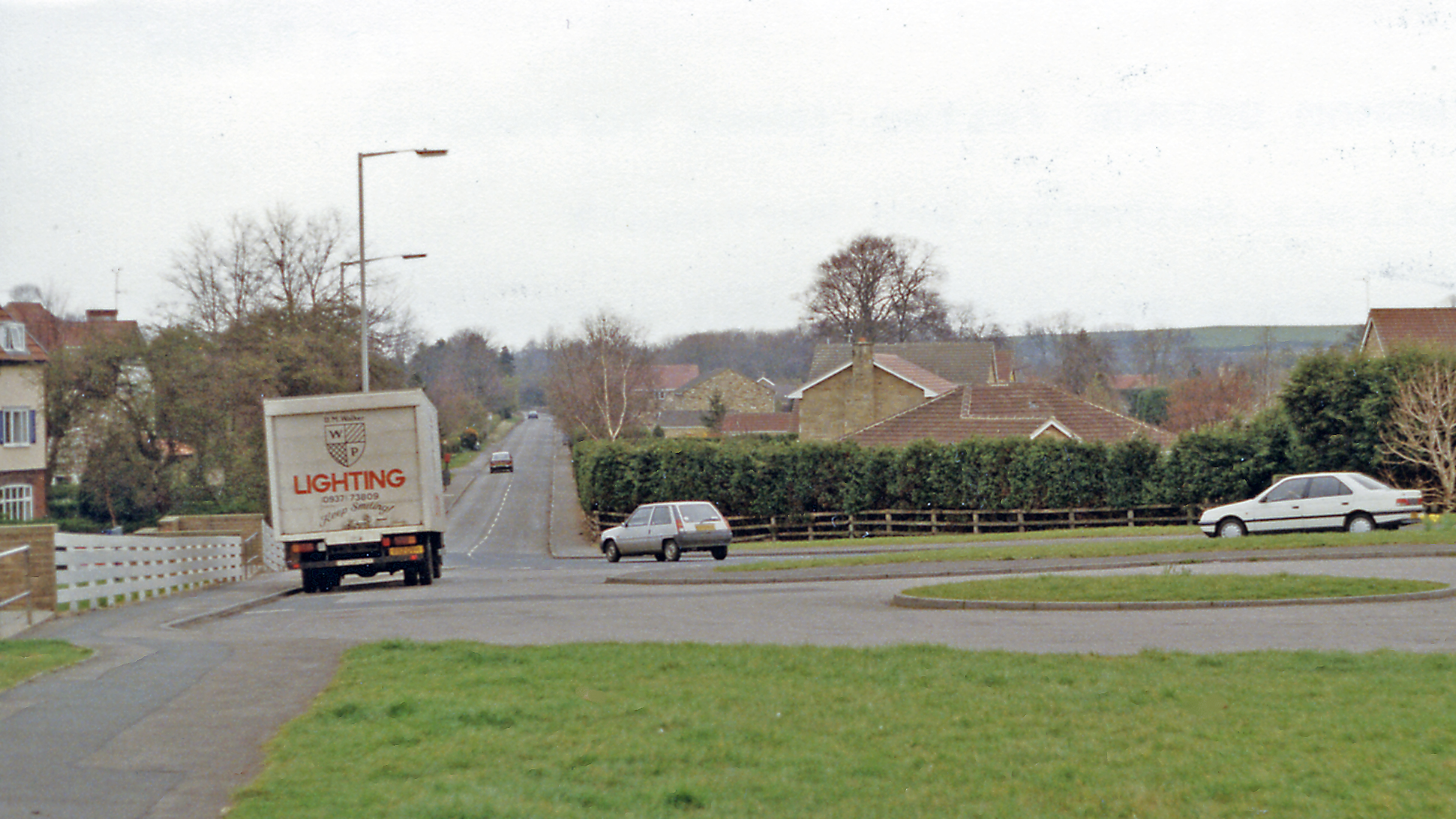
Location of the station (1989)

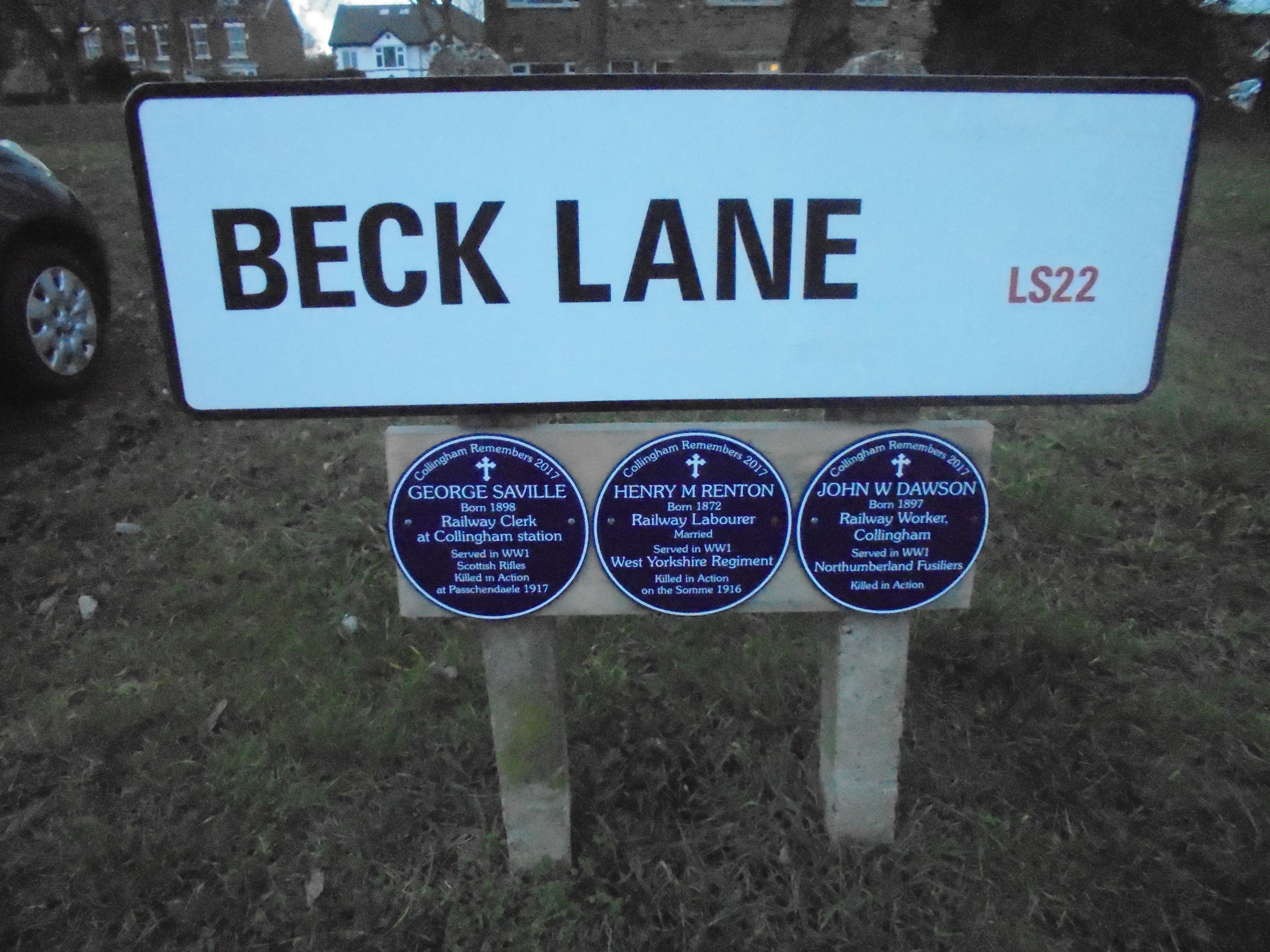
Blue plaques for the three station staff killed in the First World War.
