= Cross Gates railway station =

Railway station in West Yorkshire, England

Cross Gates
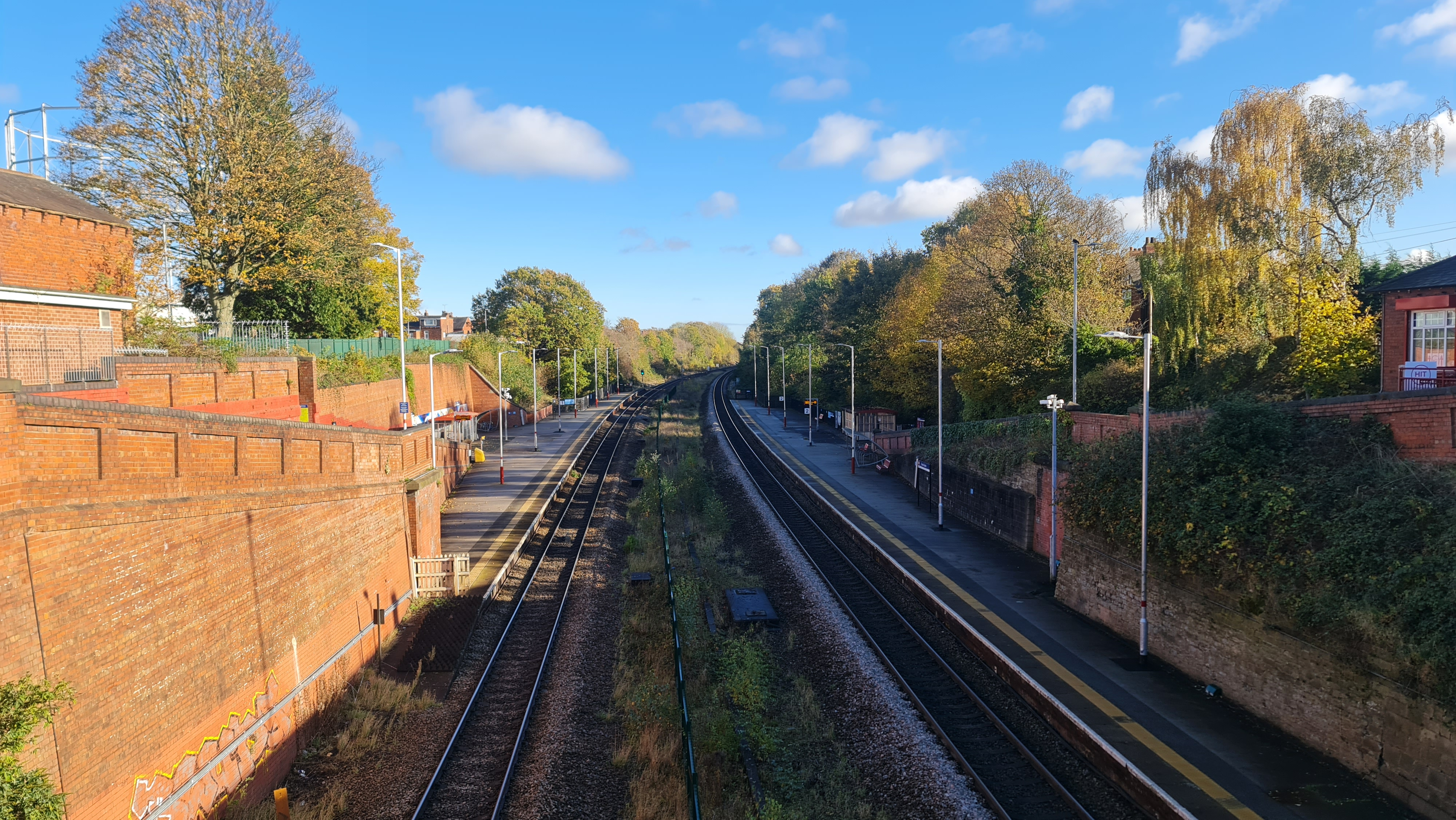
- View of Cross Gates railway station taken from the road bridge November 2023

General information
- Location: Cross Gates, City of Leeds; England
- Coordinates: 53.805°N 1.450°W
- Grid reference: SE363344
- Manager: Northern
- Transit authority: West Yorkshire (Metro)
- Platforms: 2

Other information
- Station code: CRG
- Fare zone: 2
- Classification: DfT category E

Passengers
- 2020/21: ▼0.117 million
- 2021/22: ▲0.312 million
- 2022/23: ▲0.387 million
- 2023/24: ▲0.420 million
- 2024/25: ▲0.474 million
Location
Notes
- Passenger statistics from the Office of Rail and Road

Cross Gates railway station serves Cross Gates, an area in Leeds, West Yorkshire, England. It lies on the Selby Line, operated by Northern 4.25 miles (7 km) east of Leeds railway station.

In the past, signwriters have been unsure as to the correct spelling of Cross Gates, with "Cross Gates" on the westbound platform and "Crossgates" on one sign on the eastbound platform. Only the "Cross Gates" spelling is shown, and this is also the version used by National Rail Enquiries.

== History ==
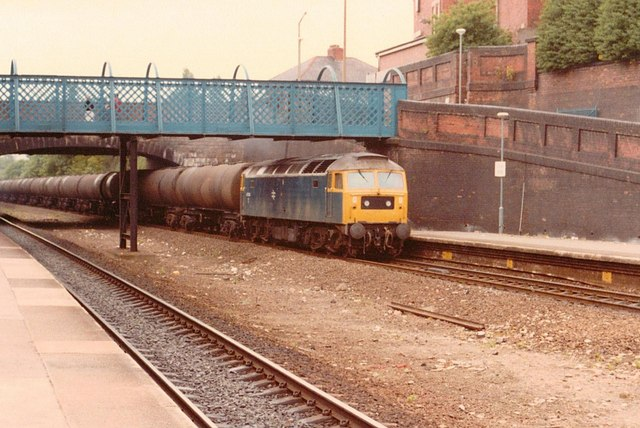
Oil train at Cross Gates station in 1984

The station was originally opened by the Leeds and Selby Railway in 1834, but was closed in 1840 when the L&SR was leased by George Hudson's York and North Midland Railway. It reopened in 1850, but patronage was initially modest due to Cross Gates being a small village some distance from Leeds. The subsequent extension of the L&SR into the centre of Leeds in 1869 and the opening of the line to Wetherby seven years later saw usage increase significantly, with the community becoming a busy commuter suburb. A rebuild of the station was authorised in 1870 by the North Eastern Railway, but this was not carried out until 1902; the line from Leeds was quadrupled at this time, and the station re-sited slightly east of its original position. In its rebuilt form, platforms were only provided on the outside (slow) lines, along with a ticket office at street level, substantial canopies and waiting rooms on each side. A new goods yard was also built alongside the eastbound platform.

Goods traffic ceased here in June 1964, and the fast lines were removed by the end of the decade. The platform canopies and buildings were demolished in stages in the 1970s, leaving only basic shelters in place. The old lattice footbridge linking the platforms was also demolished in 2007 after being disused and blocked off for several years.

From 1876 until January 1964, passenger services existed between Cross Gates and Wetherby railway station. The Cross Gates to Wetherby line was closed under the Beeching cuts, with all traffic ceasing in April the same year. Alternative routes to Scarborough existed along this line as well as raceday specials to Wetherby racecourse. Services on this line ran to the following railway stations, Pendas Way, Scholes, Thorner, Bardsey, Collingham Bridge and Wetherby. Wetherby Racecourse also operated its own railway station, on the Harrogate to Church Fenton Line.

On 26 April 1901 a guard was killed when a coal train collided with a goods train, a result of driver error.

== Facilities ==
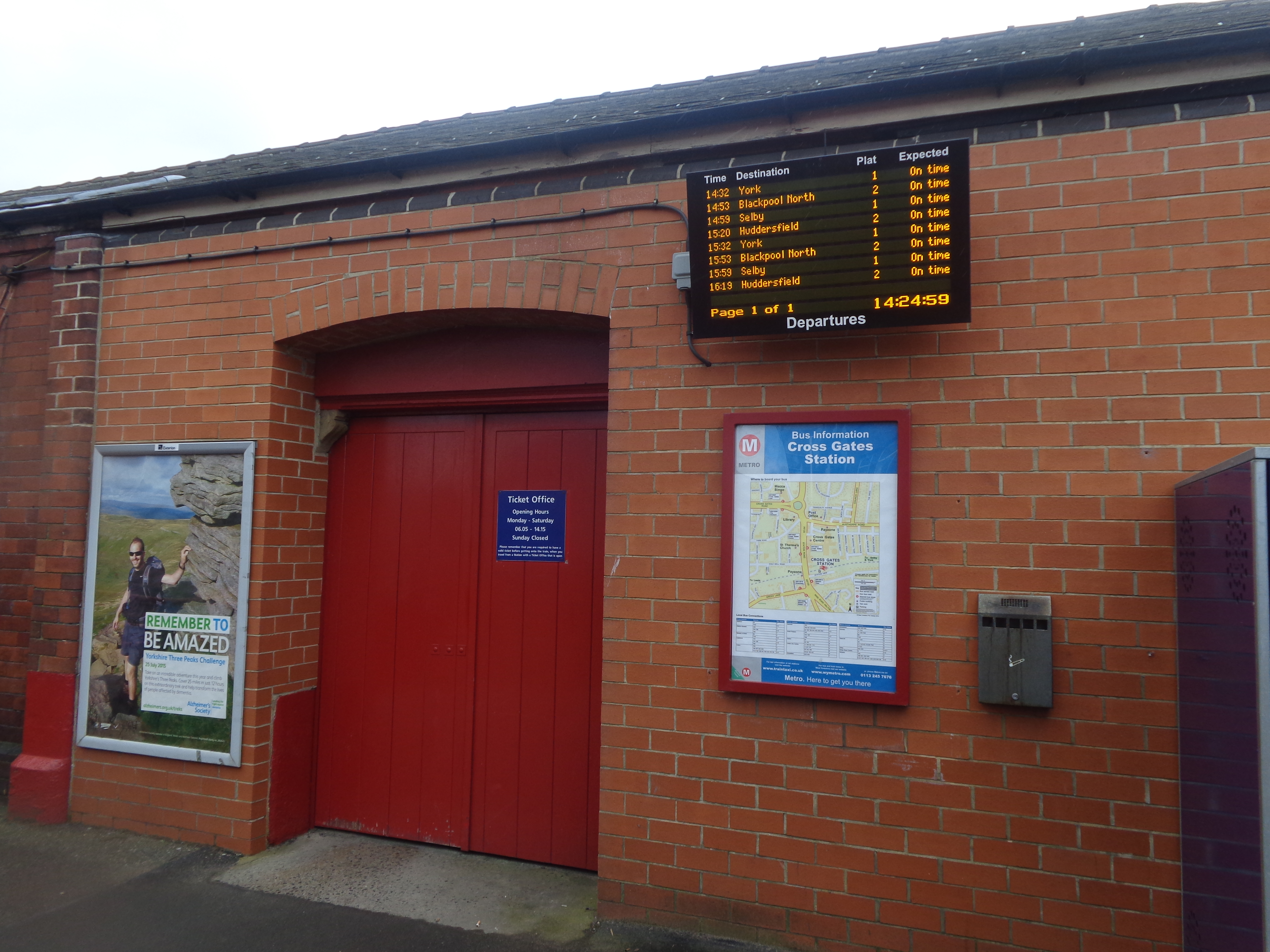
Ticket office

The station still has an active ticket office, which is staffed part-time (Mondays to Saturdays only, early morning until early afternoon). Ticket machines are also available for use outside these times and for the collection of advance purchase tickets. Step-free access is possible to both platforms, by means of ramps from the street above. Digital information screens and a long-line P.A system provides train running information.

A café named "The Waiting Room" opened in April 2017 behind the ticket office.

== Services ==
From Monday to Saturday daytime, there is a half-hourly service (with peak extras) to Leeds, with alternate trains extending through to Bradford Interchange and Halifax (the latter was introduced at the winter 2019 timetable change to restore the link previously removed in December 2018). Two weekday a.m. peak services to Blackpool North also call. Eastbound, there is an hourly service to York and Hull via Selby respectively, Monday to Saturday all day (the Selby service did not run in the evenings before the start of the winter 2019 timetable, but now runs until late evening). On Sundays, there are two trains per hour to Leeds and one each to Selby and York.

In addition to these, TransPennine Express also calls here during the morning peak on Monday to Saturday, with one train to Liverpool Lime Street via Manchester and one train to Hull.

Preceding station	National Rail	Following station
Leeds	Northern Selby Line	Garforth
Leeds	TransPennine Express North TransPennine	Garforth
	Historical railways	
Osmondthorpe; Line open; station closed	London and North Eastern Railway; Leeds and Selby Railway	Garforth; Line and station open
Leeds Marsh Lane; Line open, station closed	North Eastern Railway; Leeds and Selby Railway	Manston; Line open; station closed
	Disused railways	
Terminus	London and North Eastern Railway; Cross Gates to Wetherby Line	Penda's Way; Line and station closed
