= Harrogate–Church Fenton line =

Disused railway line in Yorkshire, England

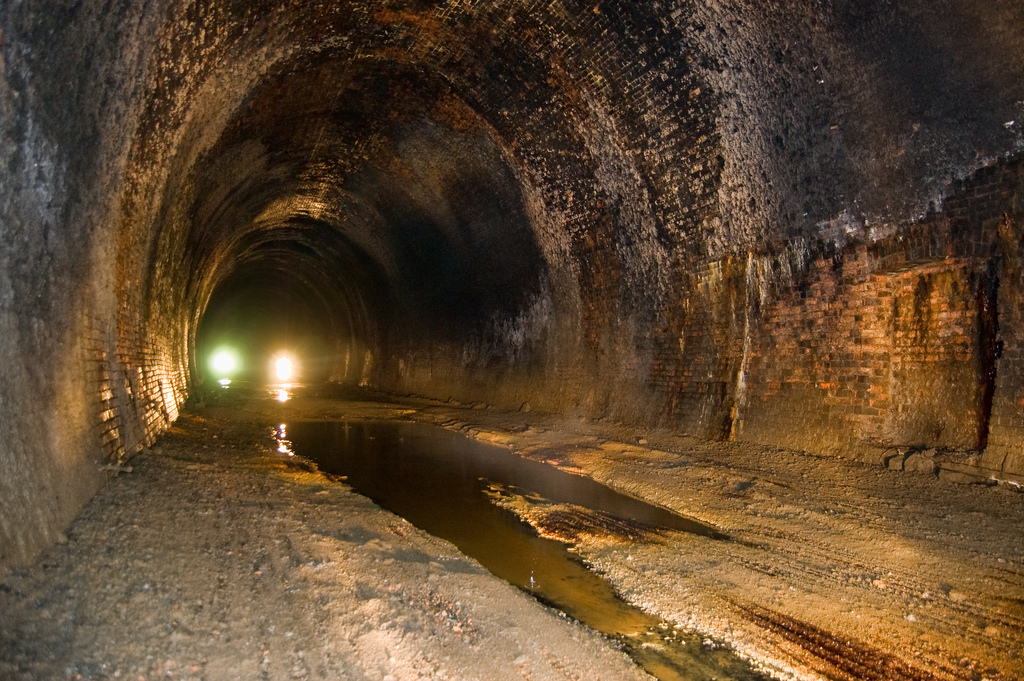
- Prospect Tunnel

Overview
- Status: Closed from Crimple junction to Church Fenton junction
- Locale: North Yorkshire
- Termini: Harrogate; Church Fenton North Junction
- Stations: 8

Service
- Type: Heavy rail
- Operators: York and North Midland Railway to 1854; North Eastern Railway 1854–1923; London and North Eastern Railway 1923–1948; British Railways (N.E region) 1948 to closure
- Depot(s): Harrogate Low (Brunswick, closed 1862)

History
- Opened: 10 August 1847
- Closed: 6 January 1964 (passengers), 30 November 1966 (goods)

Technical
- Line length: 18.5 miles (29.8 km)
- Number of tracks: double
- Track gauge: 4 ft 8 1/2 in (1,435 mm) standard gauge
- Highest elevation: 393 ft (120 m)

The Harrogate–Church Fenton line was a railway line in North Yorkshire, opened by the York and North Midland Railway between 1847 and 1848, linking Harrogate and Church Fenton.

== History ==
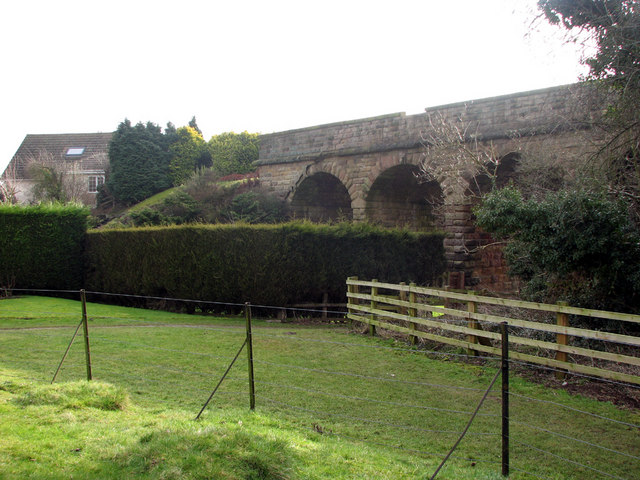
Viaduct near Spofforth Castle

The Harrogate–Church Fenton line ran from Harrogate to Church Fenton. It was staked out by York and North Midland Railway in September 1845 and opened from Church Fenton to Spofforth on 10 August 1847. The line from Spofforth and Harrogate was opened on 20 July 1848, after the completion of the major engineering structures on the line, the 31-arch, 624 yards (571 m) Crimple Viaduct and the 825-yard (754 m) Prospect Tunnel.

A short-lived station named Crimple, located on the junction with the Leeds–Harrogate line immediately east of the viaduct, only appeared in timetables from 1867 to 1869 and has been demolished. The curve from Pannal Junction to Crimple Junction was opened on 1 August 1862 and enabled trains from Leeds to reach the new station at Harrogate across Crimple Viaduct.

In 1901, a new south-to-west curve was built at Wetherby to enable trains from Harrogate to Wetherby to use the Cross Gates–Wetherby line without reversing. Following that, a new passenger station serving Wetherby was opened on the Cross Gates–Wetherby line, and the Wetherby station on the Harrogate–Church Fenton line became goods-only.

In April 1942, the Thorp Arch circular railway was opened to serve Thorp Arch Royal Ordnance Factory, which produced munitions. Trains accessed the single-track railway from the Harrogate–Church Fenton line near Thorp Arch station. The ROF at Thorp Arch closed in 1958 and the circular railway was closed and lifted in the same year.

Stutton station closed to passengers on 1 July 1905 but remained open for goods until the end of July 1964. The station master at Stutton in the 1890s was named Wilson Mortimer and his story, along with the traffic dealt with at this small station, is covered in a research paper.

The whole line between Crimple Junction and Church Fenton North Junction was closed to passengers in January 1964, being one of the first casualties of the Beeching cuts, and closed entirely in 1966.

== Harrogate Brunswick ==
The original terminus was at Harrogate Brunswick, on a line that left the present one just north of Hornbeam Park railway station and headed westwards through the 400-yard (370 m) Brunswick Tunnel, exiting at the site of the Leeds Road and Park Drive roundabout. It then went through a cutting before terminating at Brunswick Station.

The railway was routed through a tunnel rather than across The Stray parkland because the townsfolk were worried about the railway lowering the aristocratic tone of the spa town. The station was in operation from 1848 to 1862, and was replaced when the North Eastern Railway built a station on the site of what is the modern day Harrogate railway station.

During the Second World War, Brunswick Tunnel was used as an air raid shelter.

== The line today ==
A very short stretch of the original line (2-mile (3.2 km)) is still in use as part of the Harrogate line, with services to and from Leeds. Whilst the southern portal of the tunnel is still visible, all traces of the station site at Brunswick have been removed.

In 1992, a 3-mile (4.8 km) stretch of the former trackbed between Spofforth and Wetherby was converted into a cycle track. By 2003, the path had been extended to Thorp Arch and also included the former triangle of lines at Wetherby, thereby linking with cycle paths to Linton and Collingham on the West Yorkshire Cycle Route.

In January 2019, the Campaign for Better Transport released a report identifying the line as Priority 2 for reopening. Priority 2 is for those lines which require further development or a change in circumstances, such as housing developments.
