= Milford Sidings =

Railway sidings in North Yorkshire, England

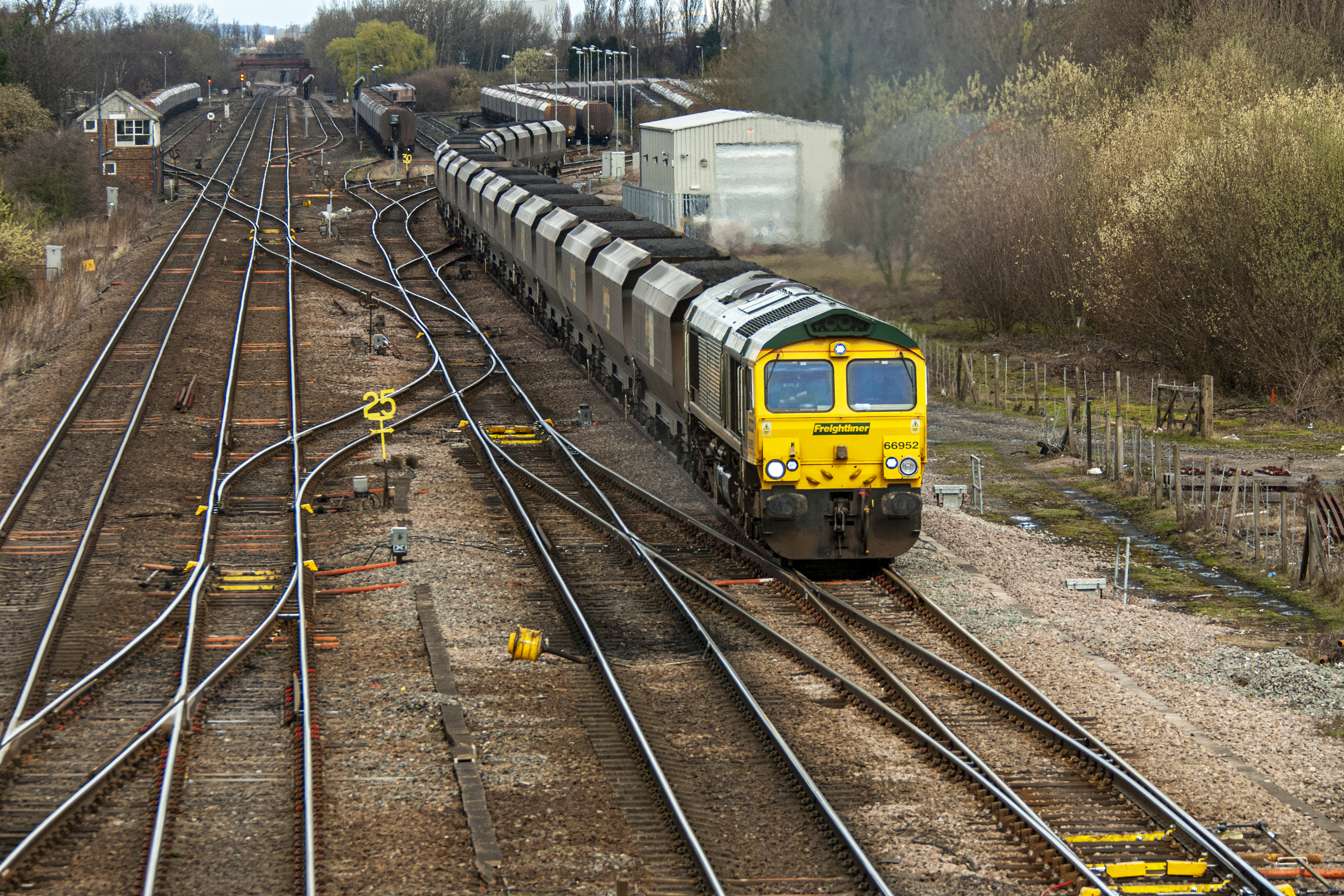
- 66592 passes Milford Sidings with a coal train

Location
- Location: South Milford, North Yorkshire, England
- Coordinates: 53.7718°N 1.2371°W
- OS grid: SE504308

Characteristics
- Owner: Network Rail
- Type: Wagon storage sidings
- Roads: 11 dead end sidings, 9 through sidings

History
- Opened: 1983
- BR region: Eastern

Milford Sidings are a set of railway sidings in South Milford, North Yorkshire, England. The railways through the site were initially opened in 1834 and 1840, when transfer and marshalling yards opened too, which handled mostly coal. However, the current sidings were developed in the 1980s to function as layover (staging in railway parlance) sidings for coal trains to and from the Aire Valley power stations. The sidings have access to several railway lines radiating in almost all directions.

With the drawdown of coal-fired power stations in line with UK government directives, the sidings have been used less due to the loss of coal trains. However, they are still used to stage other freight trains.

== History ==
The first railway through the area was opened in September 1834 as the Leeds and Selby Railway, which ran on an east/west formation north of the Milford Sidings site, and this line is the present Leeds to Hull (via Selby) line. The second line ran in a north/south direction under the Leeds and Selby at Milford connecting York with Normanton as the York and North Midland Railway. This second line, with a south to east facing connection to the Leeds and Selby railway, was completed in 1840. This allowed passengers to and from Hull, to change trains at Milford Junction station, when previously, they had to change at Sherburn-in-Elmet station.

A large hump marshalling yard covering 47 acres (19 ha), was built at Gascoigne Wood on the Leeds to Selby line, which had access to the former York and North Midland Line, both to the north and south. This yard was one of several hump yards built by the North Eastern Railway (NER) (others being at Stockton, York and Hull), and consisted of at least 28 lines grouped on either side of the main line. Sidings were also present at the site of Milford Junction station, in the same place as the re-laid sidings of the 1980s, however, these later sidings have taken up the area formerly used by Milford Junction station.

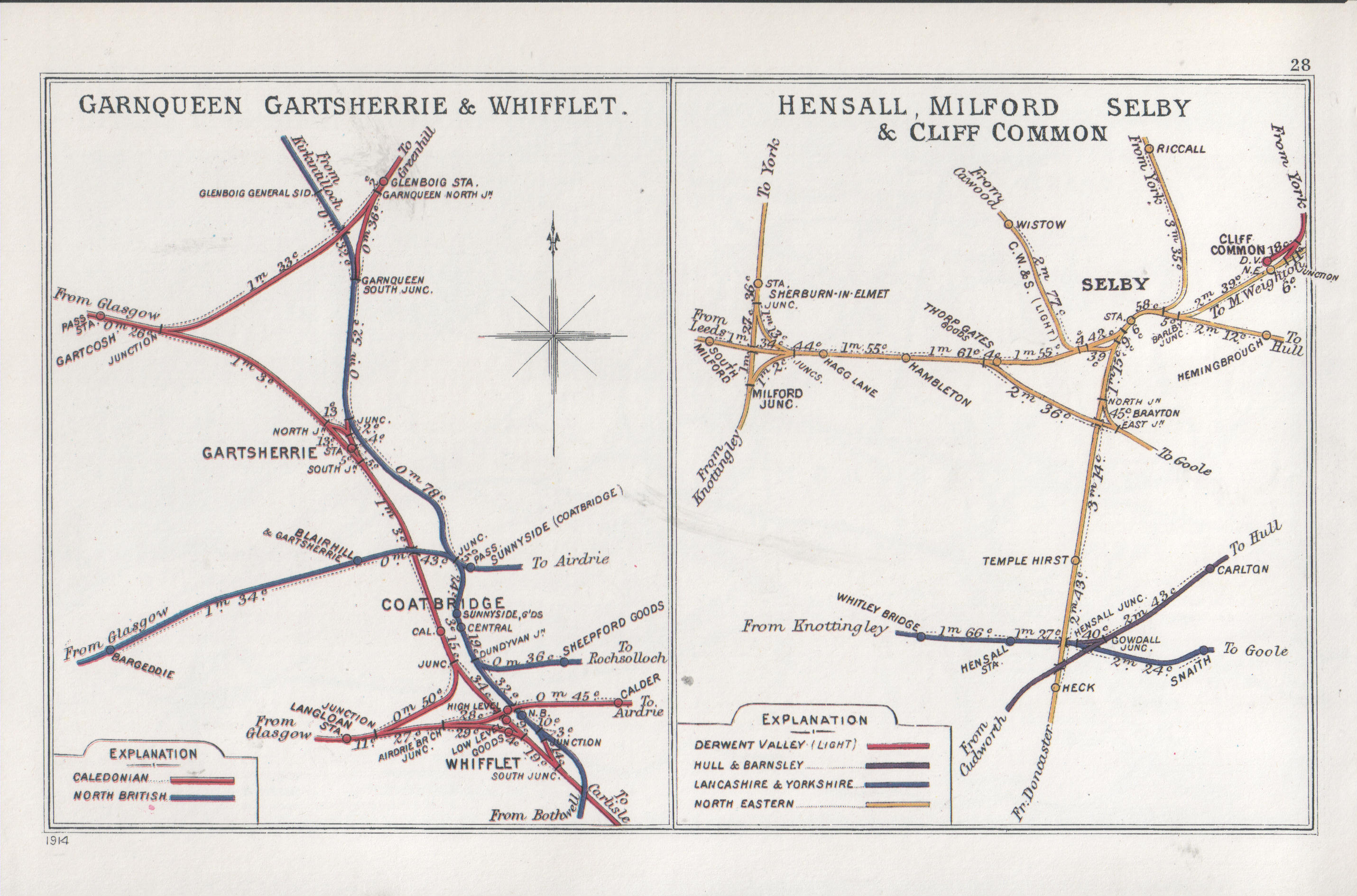
Hensall, Milford Selby on the right. This shows Hagg Lane as being a station.

With the opening of the Selby 'Super Pit' complex, which had a loading terminal at Gascoigne Wood, the need for some sidings to stage and store coal wagons nearby was needed, and these were installed at Milford Junction between 1980 and 1983. To enable the new sidings to have access to the running lines to Gascoigne Wood and to the north via York, the curve from Gascoigne Wood to Milford Junction was slewed outwards (towards the east) to accommodate the new sidings. These twelve new sidings, the associated sidings, and loading area at Gascoigne Wood cost £47 million, £1.5 million of which was provided by the EEC. Six through sidings and six dead-end sidings were built between the lines going north to York, and the curve to Gascoigne Wood as part of the Selby Diversion programme. The sidings are used as a staging point for freight trains transiting across Great Britain. When the Aire Valley power stations were receiving deliveries of coal, loaded and empty coal wagons were stored in the sidings until they were needed for their next task. The sidings provide access to lines through Castleford, Pontefract, Knottingley, Swinton, Goole and Doncaster to the south, to Selby, Hull in the east, and York to the north. The Selby Coalfield complex was estimated to be produced over 10,000,000 tonnes (11,000,000 tons) of coal by the late 1980s, resulting in a loaded coal train leaving Gascoigne Wood every 30 minutes during Monday to Friday. This necessitated the expansive sidings at Milford.

Wagon maintenance was undertaken at the sidings in a limited capacity, however, wagons were taken from Milford Sidings to the traction maintenance depot at Knottingley some 5 miles (8 km) south for more in-depth work. The shunter allocated to Knottingley would undertake this duty moving wagons between the two sites.

With the downturn in the electricity supply industry (ESI) coal trains due to power station closures, many redundant coal hopper wagons have been stored at both sets of sidings either side of the main north/south lines. The site has also been used to store redundant Mk 3 coaches from displaced Intercity 125 sets which have been superseded by newer trains on the East Coast Main Line. Milford Down yard was used as a temporary offloading point for desulphogypsum from Drax Power Station bound for the gypsum plant at nearby Sherburn-in-Elmet in 2007. However, this was deemed unsuitable because of the need to move the desulphogypsum on public roads to the plant. The former rail terminal at Gascoigne Wood was utilised instead.
