= Ferrybridge railway station =

Former railway station in England

Ferrybridge
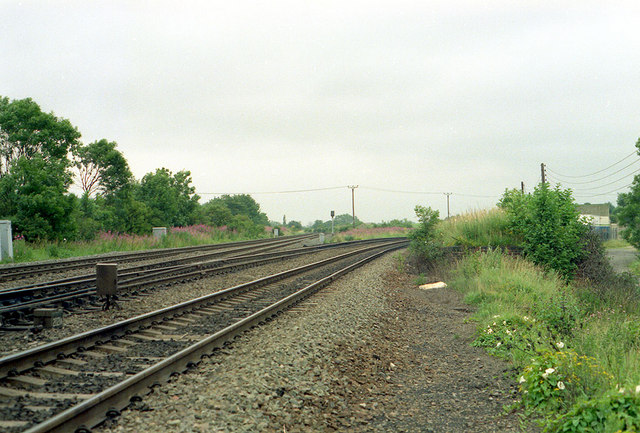
- The southern end of the former Ferrybridge railway station, now occupied by the northern end of the extended Ferrybridge junction.

General information
- Location: Ferrybridge, City of Wakefield; England
- Coordinates: 53.7120°N 1.2711°W
- Grid reference: SE482242
- Platforms: 2

Other information
- Status: Disused

Key dates
- 1882: Opened
- 1965: Closed
Location

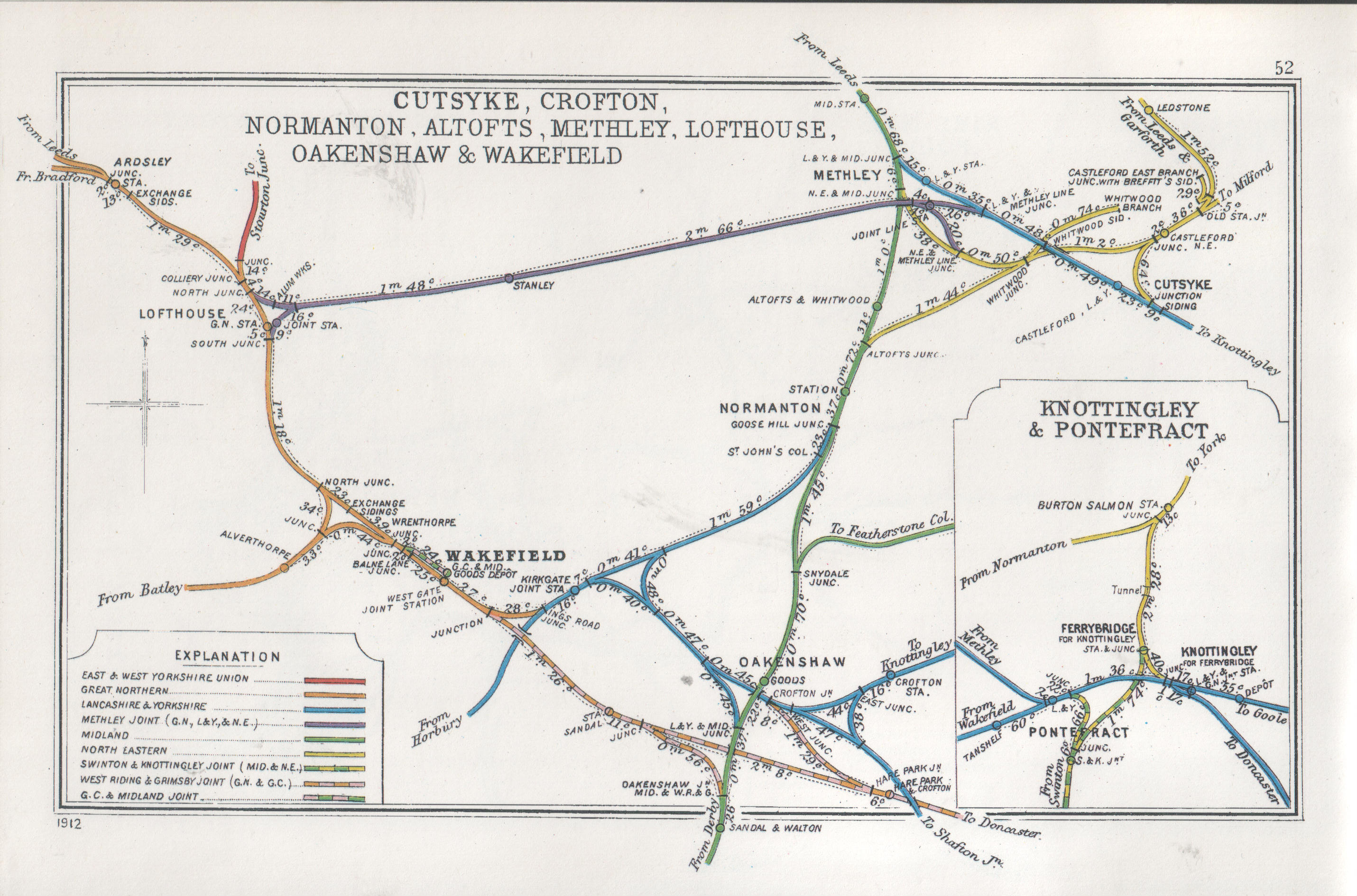
Railway Clearing House diagram showing lines around Knottingley in 1912.

Ferrybridge railway station was a railway station located in Ferrybridge, West Yorkshire, England on the London and North Eastern Line. The station was opened in 1882 by the North Eastern Railway, three years after the completion of the Swinton & Knottingley Joint line via Moorthorpe on 1 May 1879 and closed in 1965.

== Location ==
Ferrybridge railway station was located just north of Ferrybridge junction. From Ferrybridge railway station, stations such as Pontefract Baghill (which still remains open today) and Ackworth (closed in 1951) would be reached as well as other stations to Sheffield. Heading north from Ferrybridge stations such as Milford Junction (closed 1904), Monk Fryston (closed 1959) and Burton Salmon (closed 1959) could be reached, as well as other stations to York.

== History ==
Prior to the opening of Ferrybridge railway station, there was no direct link between York and Knottingley. A link between Burton Salmon, Ferrybridge and Knottingley needed to be built, which was completed in 1850. Services from Knottingley ended in 1947, but the station still received calls from Sheffield-to-York local trains until its closure in November 1965.

== Station masters ==
Station Master	Start Year	End Year
Mr Aubrey Frank Johnson	1922?	1927

== Notes ==
Preceding station	Disused railways	Following station
Pontefract Baghill; Line and station open	North Eastern Railway; York and North Midland Railway	Burton Salmon; Line open, station closed
Knottingley; Line and station open	North Eastern Railway; York and North Midland Railway	Burton Salmon; Line open, station closed
