= Hambleton railway station =

Disused station in North Yorkshire, England

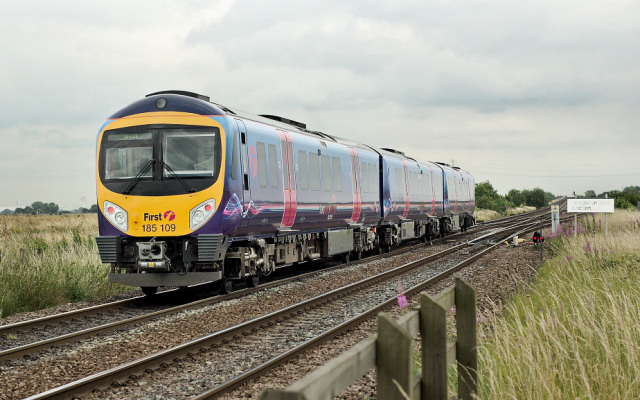
- Hambleton West Junction; the station was just behind the white sign on the right

General information
- Location: Hambleton, Selby; North Yorkshire; England
- Coordinates: 53.776°N 1.162°W
- Ordnance Survey: SE552315
- Elevation: 26 feet (8 m)
- Line: Leeds to Selby
- Platforms: 2

History
- Original company: Leeds and Selby Railway
- Pre-grouping: North Eastern Railway
- Post-grouping: London and North Eastern Railway

Key dates
- 22 September 1834: opened for passengers
- 15 December 1834: Opened to goods
- 14 September 1959: Closed to regular passenger services
- 7 September 1964: closed for goods
- 1980: last used for special passenger service
Location

Hambleton railway station was a railway station on the Leeds and Selby Railway in North Yorkshire, (Note: The station was originally in the West Riding of Yorkshire between 1834 and 1964. The station site is now in North Yorkshire.) England. The station was opened with the line in 1834, closed to passengers in 1959 and then to goods in 1964. It was used sporadically in the 1970s as an embarkation point when Selby station was undergoing refurbishment. The site of the station has been partly demolished by a new railway spur built in 1983.

== History ==
The station was opened on 22 September 1834, the same day that the line between Leeds Marsh Lane and Selby was inaugurated. The station was opened up to goods traffic in December 1834, and was furnished with a goods shed on the south side which had a west facing connection. At the opening of the station, first-class tickets to Leeds cost three shillings, and second-class cost two shillings. The next stop eastwards was Selby, the original final stop, which cost one shilling to travel to for first-class passengers, and sixpence for second-class. The station was 4 miles 43 chains (7.3 km) west of Selby, and 15 miles 5 chains (24.2 km) east of the original terminus of Marsh Lane in Leeds.

A derailment in May 1853 some 0.5 miles (0.8 km) east of the station, resulted in the driver and stoker of the derailed train dying after a goods train travelling in the opposite direction collided with their derailed engine. The state of the "road" was given as the cause of the accident. In 1894, the Railway Clearing House Handbook listed Hambleton as dealing in passengers, general goods and livestock with no indication of a steam crane. In 1904, the same updated publication also mentioned the addition of horse boxes and a steam crane with the capability of lifting 1.5 tonnes (1.7 tons).

The station was closed to passengers on 14 September 1959, and then to goods on 7 September 1964, though the site was used for passengers briefly in March 1975, and again in July 1980 when Selby station was undergoing a refurbishment or was closed. The southern side of the station site has been built over as part of Hambleton Junction, a spur built in 1983 from the Selby Diversion to the Leeds line. The line through the station site is still open, with the route of the Leeds to Selby railway carrying trains between Leeds, Selby and Hull.

== Services ==
At the opening of the line in 1834, services amounted to four each way with just two on Sundays. In 1866, the station was served by three passenger trains per day each way, with an extra stop on Mondays for the Selby market traffic. By 1882, this had doubled to six trains each way, all going to Leeds (New) station, running on the through platforms at Marsh Lane station in Leeds. By 1944, the traffic was down to three trains each, in either direction, which by 1946, had been improved again with nine services calling each way.

== Notes ==
Preceding station	Historical railways	Following station
Gascoigne Wood Junction; Line open, station closed	North Eastern Railway; Leeds and Selby Railway	Selby; Line open, station open
Milford Junction; Line open, station closed	North Eastern Railway; York and North Midland Railway	Selby; Line open, station open
