= Milford Junction =

Milford Junction may refer to:

- Milford Junction, a rail junction between the lines of the York and North Midland Railway and Leeds and Selby Railway
  - Milford Old junction railway station, also known as York Junction, and Gascoigne Wood; on the Leeds to Selby line, UK
  - Milford Junction railway station on the York and North Midland Railway, UK
- Milford Junction, Indiana
