= Marsh Lane railway station =

Marsh Lane railway station can refer to:

- Marsh Lane & Strand Road railway station, now called Bootle New Strand railway station in Bootle, Merseyside, England.
- Marsh Lane railway station, Leeds, former terminus of the Leeds and Selby Railway in Leeds, England.
- Northumberland Park railway station in London, England, formerly known as Marsh Lane

== See also ==
- Marsh Lane (disambiguation)
