= Monk Fryston railway station =

Disused railway station in North Yorkshire England

Monk Fryston
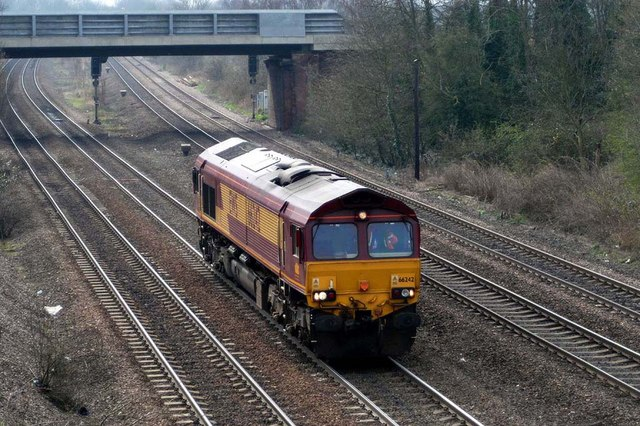
- 66 242 at Monk Fryston; the station was just beyond the bridge

General information
- Location: Monk Fryston, North Yorkshire; England
- Coordinates: 53.761°N 1.241°W
- Grid reference: SE501297
- Platforms: 2
- Tracks: 4

History
- Opened: 1 October 1904
- Closed: 4 May 1964
- Original company: York and North Midland Railway
- Pre-grouping: North Eastern Railway
- Post-grouping: London and North Eastern Railway
Location

Monk Fryston railway station was a railway station serving the village of Monk Fryston in North Yorkshire, (Note: The station was originally in the West Riding of Yorkshire between 1834 and 1964. The station site is now in the Selby District of North Yorkshire.) England. Previously, Milford Junction and Old Junction (Gascoigne Wood) served as an interchange between the Leeds and Selby and the York and North Midland Lines, however when they closed in the early 1900s, Monk Fryston was opened to cover for this loss of interchange. Though the station had four tracks through it, it only ever had two platforms. The station closed to passengers in 1959, and then completely in 1964.

== History ==
Monk Fryston station was opened in October 1904, some 64 years after the railway had arrived in the locale. Previous to this, passengers used the station at Milford Junction, but this closed the same day as Monk Fryston opened, with passengers changing at either Burton Salmon or Church Fenton for interchanges with other trains. The closure of Milford Junction station to the north, created a loss for local passengers and some interchanges between trains. Monk Fryston was opened partially to alleviate this problem. The station is listed as having cost £639 to build in 1904. It was located on the westernmost lines of a four track section between Burton Salmon and Milford Junction, some 1 3/4 miles (2.8 km) north of Burton Salmon, and 2 3/4 miles (4.4 km) south of Sherburn-in-Elmet. The two easternmost tracks did not have platforms.

The station was equipped with a siding next to the northbound platform line, and a signal box between the two sets of running lines. The main exports from the station were grain and vegetables in bulk. The station was listed as being able to handle livestock, general goods, and coal. It was serviced by stopping local trains, though diversions from the East Coast Main Line were often seen through the station. The line through the station was previously on the main route between York and Doncaster until the line through Selby to Shaftholme Junction was built in 1871.

Monk Fryston was closed to passengers on 14 September 1959, and the station was classified as a public delivery siding for goods. Monk Fryston closed completely in May 1964.

== Services ==
In 1906 when services were operated by the North Eastern Railway (NER), the station had four trains a day each-way between Sheffield and York via Pontefract Baghill. The service through Castleford towards York, saw double the amount of trains per day. In 1913, services operated by the NER amounted to seven each way between York and Normanton.

By 1935, the LNER were operating most services with at least nine trains calling at the station. In 1946, the LMS provided three trains each way between Sheffield and York, and the LNER provided one direct service from Manchester to Selby, four between Normanton and York, and four between Sheffield and York.

== Notes ==
Preceding station	Disused railways	Following station
Burton Salmon; Line open, station closed	NER; York and North Midland Railway	Sherburn-in-Elmet; Line and station open
