= Hambleton, Selby =

Village and civil parish in North Yorkshire, England

Coordinates: 53°46′15″N 1°09′51″W

Hambleton
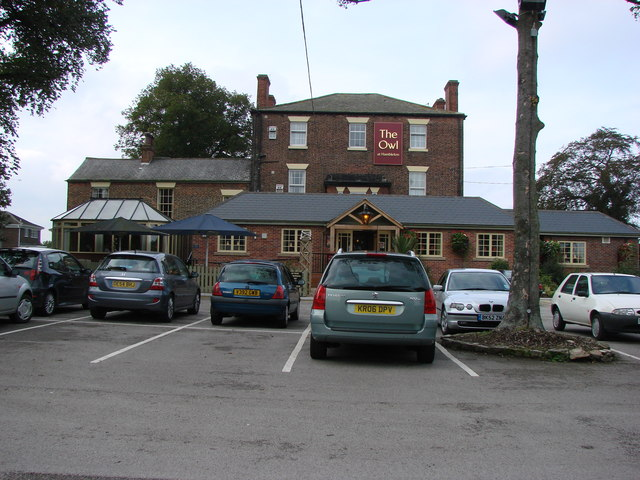
- The Owl Hotel, Hambleton

- Location within North Yorkshire
- Population: 1,859 2011 census
- OS grid reference: SE555305
- Civil parish: Hambleton
- Unitary authority: North Yorkshire
- Ceremonial county: North Yorkshire
- Region: Yorkshire and the Humber
- Country: England
- Sovereign state: United Kingdom
- Post town: SELBY
- Postcode district: YO8
- Police: North Yorkshire
- Fire: North Yorkshire
- Ambulance: Yorkshire

Hambleton is a small village and civil parish near to Selby in North Yorkshire, England, not to be confused with the former Hambleton District of North Yorkshire.

The village was historically part of the West Riding of Yorkshire until 1974. From 1974 to 2023 it was part of the Selby District, it is now administered by the unitary North Yorkshire Council.

== History ==
The village is mentioned in the Domesday Book as Hameltun which means Hamela's town. Hambleton is situated just over 3 miles (4.8 km) west of Selby and lies about 5 miles (8 km) east of the A1(M) motorway junction 42. The A63 road, Leeds to Selby, runs through the village.

According to the 2001 UK census, the population of Hambleton parish was 1,711, increasing to 1,859 at the 2011 Census.

The parish church, St Mary's Church, Hambleton, was built in 1882. There are two pubs: The Red Lion and The Owl. There is also a village shop. As of September 2014, the Wheatsheaf pub has closed and went up for sale - during June 2015 demolition of the building commenced.

Hambleton used to have a railway station, off Station Road, which closed to passengers in 1959.

== Governance ==
The name Hambleton is now also assigned to an electoral ward. This ward also covers Thorpe Willoughby and surrounding areas. The total population of the ward taken at the 2011 Census was 5,315.

== See also ==
- Listed buildings in Hambleton, Selby
- Hambleton Junction - a railway junction between the East Coast Main Line and the Leeds to Selby Line north of the village
