= Gascoigne Wood Junction railway station =

Closed railway station in Yorkshire, England

Gascoigne Wood Junction

General information
- Location: Selby, North Yorkshire; England
- Coordinates: 53.779°N 1.215°W
- Grid reference: SE517317
- Line: Selby Line
- Platforms: 2 (1839–1901); 1 (1902–1959)

Other information
- Status: Closed

History
- Opened: 1839
- Closed: 1959
- Original company: York and North Midland Railway (Y&NMR)
- Pre-grouping: North Eastern Railway (NER)
- Post-grouping: London & North Eastern Railway (LNER)

Key dates
- 1839–1959: See chronology
Location

Gascoigne Wood Junction railway station was a railway station near Sherburn-in-Elmet in North Yorkshire, England. It was originally opened as a junction station, enabling transfers for passengers between trains. It was later a private halt station for the staff who worked at the Gascoigne Wood marshalling yard. It opened in 1839, and was closed, renamed and re-opened several times before closing completely in 1959. The station was 14 miles (23 km) from Leeds New Station, and 6 miles (9.7 km) from Selby.

== History ==
The station, called York Junction, (Note: Tomlinson refers to this location as Sherburn Junction. Plans unveiled by the Y&NMR in 1844 for a line to Doncaster, described it as 'Leaving Milford Junction", but also as a line from "Sherburn to Doncaster", with Sherburn-in-Elmet being the important location in the area at that time.) was originally opened in 1839 at a point near to where the Leeds and Selby Railway (L&S) crossed over the York & North Midland Railway (Y&NMR). A north to east curve was built linking the two railways with a station at the east end of the junction. This was closed in 1840 when the L&S became part of the Y&NMR, and traffic for Leeds was diverted to run via Burton Salmon and Methley into Leeds Hunslet Lane. Whilst Hunslet Lane was nearer to the centre of Leeds than the Marsh Lane terminus of the L&S, the route to Hunslet Lane from Gascoigne Wood Junction was 4.5 miles (7.2 km) longer. In December 1850, the station was re-opened as Old Milford Junction (or Old Junction), to allow services to work from the station to Leeds, which was three times per day. The locomotive had no access to a turntable, and rather than turn it on the triangle, it simply worked tender backwards towards Leeds. Until the line between Church Fenton and Micklefield opened in 1869, services between York and Leeds that were not going through Burton Salmon, were required to reverse at Old Junction. As the line westwards towards Micklefield from Old Junction was on an uphill gradient of 1-in-130, often trains would be split, then reformed between Micklefield and Garforth stations (which was on a level section).

In April 1867, it was renamed from Old Junction to Milford Old Junction, and on 1 November 1879, the station was renamed again, this time to Gascoigne Wood Junction. Gascoigne Wood was 14 miles 5 chains (22.6 km) east of Leeds New Station, 6 miles 27 chains (10.2 km) west of Selby and 1 mile (1.6 km) to Milford Junction to the south, and the same distance to Sherburn-in-Elmet in the North. The station was located at the western end of the marshalling yard built at Gascoigne Wood for the transfer of coal trains. Land had been bought up surrounding the station, and the yard was built around 1907, when the station was re-opened as a private staff halt, though permission was granted for the families of railway persons working at Gascoigne Wood to use the station. A map from the 1890s shows the station having two platforms with access to all three lines west, south and north, however, the map of 1950 shows a single platform accessible only from the Leeds line.

The yard at Gascoigne Wood was the largest on the NER when it opened, with over 40 miles (64 km) of sidings. One signal box was adjacent to the west end of the station, whilst at the eastern end, another signal box was located at Hagg Lane crossing. Combined, along with relief signaller for Hambleton, the signallers in the two boxes numbered six. In 1897, the NER determined that the station goods yard and the mineral yard (a term for the marshalling yard), each needed a shunter driver. Trip workings of coal from collieries local to the yard were worked from Gascoigne Wood, with engines sourced from Selby.

Whilst the Gascoigne Wood yard was closed in 1959 at the same time as the staff halt station, it was later used to build the pit head for the Selby Coalfield on the site of the former coal sidings.

=== Chronology ===
Gascoigne Wood station history
Dates	Occurrence	Ref
1839	Opened as York Junction	
1840	Closed	
1850	Re-opened as Old Junction	
1867	Renamed to Milford Old Junction	
1879	Renamed to Gascoigne Wood Junction	
1902	Closed for passengers	
1907	Re-opened as a private staff halt with one platform	
1959	Closed permanently	

== Services ==
The principal reason behind the station was to enable passengers to transfer between trains on the different lines. Apart from the goods yard, no freight was handled at the station, being listed in the Clearing House Handbook for 1894 as having no freight facilities. In 1862, two Hull to York services worked to Old Junction and then proceeded north, whilst most trains from Hull to Leeds did not stop at Old Junction, going south to Milford Junction and proceeding to Leeds via Methley. Also at this time, the local services on the line from Leeds Marsh Lane terminus arrived at Old Junction and then worked to Milford Junction to terminate. In June 1877, services amounted to six through workings per day between Hull and Leeds. At this point, in the Bradshaw's Timetable, the station is referred to as Old Junction, with Milford Junction being on the old Y&NMR line which ran on a north–south axis. In the 1880s, a connecting service between Old Junction/Gascoigne Wood Junction and Milford Junction (to the south), operated to allow the transfer of passengers between trains.

In 1885, services were listed as being six through the week, and two services on a Sunday, all running between Leeds and Hull.

== Incidents ==
- 23 December 1850, a train from York had arrived at Old Junction consisting of 22 carriages, and was split to go to Leeds up the 1-in-130 gradient. The first portion was left on a level section between Micklefield and Garforth, with the locomotive returning for the remainder of the train without the guards van. As the locomotive was ascending the bank with the last six vehicles, a cable snapped and they ran away downhill. As there was no guards van, the wagons could not be braked on the downgrade and smashed into a train at Old Junction being formed to go to Leeds. A jury at the inquest found the guard, Edward Grimston, culpable of the accident, and the coroner returned him to Yorkshire Assizes for a charge of manslaughter. At the trial, Grimston was cleared of all manslaughter charges, but was accused of great negligence on not taking the guards van with him as per company policy. There was some debate about whether or not the van would have stopped the wagons as they accelerated over the 6.5 miles (10.5 km) downgrade.
- On 3 May 1880, a passenger train from Normanton to Hull was run into by an engine shunting of the same line. The passenger train had just left Milford Junction station and was approaching Gascoigne Wood Junction station. Nine of the passengers were injured, two seriously, and the guard jumped from his van when the two trains collided.

== Notes ==
Preceding station	Disused railways	Following station
Sherburn-in-Elmet; Line and station open	York and North Midland Railway	Hambleton; Line open, station closed
South Milford; Line and station open	Leeds and Selby Railway	Hambleton; Line open, station closed
Milford Junction; Line open, station closed	York and North Midland Railway	Hambleton; Line open, station closed
