= Listed buildings in South Milford =

South Milford is a civil parish in the county of North Yorkshire, England. It contains nine listed buildings that are recorded in the National Heritage List for England. Of these, two are listed at Grade I, the highest of the three grades, and the others are at Grade II, the lowest grade. The parish contains the village of South Milford and the surrounding countryside. The listed buildings consist of a house, its gatehouse and associated buildings, a farmhouse, three railway bridges, a church and a milestone.

== Key ==
Grade	Criteria
I	Buildings of exceptional interest, sometimes considered to be internationally important
II	Buildings of national importance and special interest

== Buildings ==
Name and location	Photograph	Date	Notes	Grade
Steeton Hall Gatehouse and walls 53.77699°N 1.26701°W		Late 14th century	The gatehouse and flanking walls are in magnesian limestone with embattled parapets. The gatehouse contains a round-headed carriage arch, and to the left is a smaller round-headed pedestrian arch, both with a double-chamfered surround. Above is a projecting chimney stack on four corbels with heads, and an octagonal chimney. To the left is a slit vent, to the right is a shouldered window with a chamfered surround, and above are gargoyles. At the rear are two doorways approached by steps, an ogee-headed window with a chamfered surround, and a corbel table. The walls are about 5 metres (16 ft) in height and extend for about 4 metres (13 ft).	I
Steeton Hall; 53.77670°N 1.26803°W		Early 16th century	The house, which was later extended, is in magnesian limestone, with sandstone dressings and roofs of tile and Welsh slate, and it has a complex cruciform plan. The main block has two storeys and windows of various types. The right range has two buildings with an entrance bay between them, two storeys, and a single-storey addition to the right. The entrance bay has two storeys and an embattled parapet. It contains a doorway with a basket arch, a moulded archivolt and a hood mould, and above it is a blocked window with a pointed arch flanked by niches. At the rear is a three-storey pigeoncote. The left range has an embattled porch.	I
Former farm buildings, Steeton Hall; 53.77713°N 1.26755°W	—	17th century (probable)	The farm buildings are in magnesian limestonewith a stone slate roof. They consist of a barn and a granary with two storeys and seven bays, single-storey outshuts at the right and the rear, and a two-bay cart shed on the front with a catslide roof. They contain two entrances with quoined surrounds, steps lead up to the granary entrance, and elsewhere are square openings.	II
Inglenook Farmhouse; 53.77761°N 1.25599°W	—	Mid-18th century	The farmhouse is in stone and has two storeys, an earlier block to the right, and a roof with stone coping and kneelers. The later block has three bays, a plinth, quoins, a central doorway with a quoined surround and an oblong fanlight, and sash windows. The earlier part has two bays, and contains a blocked doorway, a three-light mullioned window, a small single light, and modern casement windows.	II
Gorse Lane Bridge; 53.78351°N 1.27439°W		c. 1830–34	The bridge was designed by James Walker to carry the Leeds and Selby Railway over Gorse Lane. It is in sandstone and magnesian limestone, and consists of a basket arch of voussoirs springing from impost bands. The parapets have curved coping, they end in oval piers, and are set on square-cut string courses.	II
Milford Road Bridge; 53.78213°N 1.24857°W		c. 1830–34	The bridge was designed by James Walker to carry the Leeds and Selby Railway over Milford Road. It is in magnesian limestone with an arch in red engineering brick, and a gritstone parapet, and it consists of a single-span skew bridge, the arch springing from impost bands. The raked and angled wing walls are in limestone, and the parapets end in rounded piers.	II
Common Lane Bridge; 53.7806321°N 1.2345539°W		c. 1839–40	An intersector railway underbridge designed by Robert Stephenson to carry the York and North Midland Railway under the Leeds and Selby Railway. It is in red brick, with sandstone dressings, and consists of a single segmental arch springing from impost bands. Extending from the abutments are canted brick walls with stone coping, ending in square brick piers with capstones. The parapets are in brick with stone coping and end in rectangular brick piers with stone plinths.	II
St Mary's Church; 53.77721°N 1.25439°W		1846	The church, designed by George Fowler Jones, is built in magnesian limestone, with sandstone dressings and a Welsh slate roof. It consists of a nave, a north porch, a chancel, an octagonal north vestry with a pyramidal roof, and another vestry to the south. At the west end is a bell turret, and below it is a rose window. The other windows are lancets with trefoil heads, and at the east end are three stepped lancets.	II
Milestone; 53.76661°N 1.25137°W		19th centuryable)	The milestone on the east side of the A162 road is in stone with a cast iron plate. It has a triangular plan, it is about 1.25 metres (4 ft 1 in) in height, and has a semicircular head. On the head is inscribed "TADCASTER & DONCASTER ROAD" and "HUDDLESTON CUM LUMBY". The left side has the distances to Doncaster, Pontefract and Ferrybridge, and on the right side are the distances to York and Tadcaster.	II
