= St Mary's Church, South Milford =

Church in South Milford, North Yorkshire, England

Coordinates: 53°46′38″N 1°15′16″W

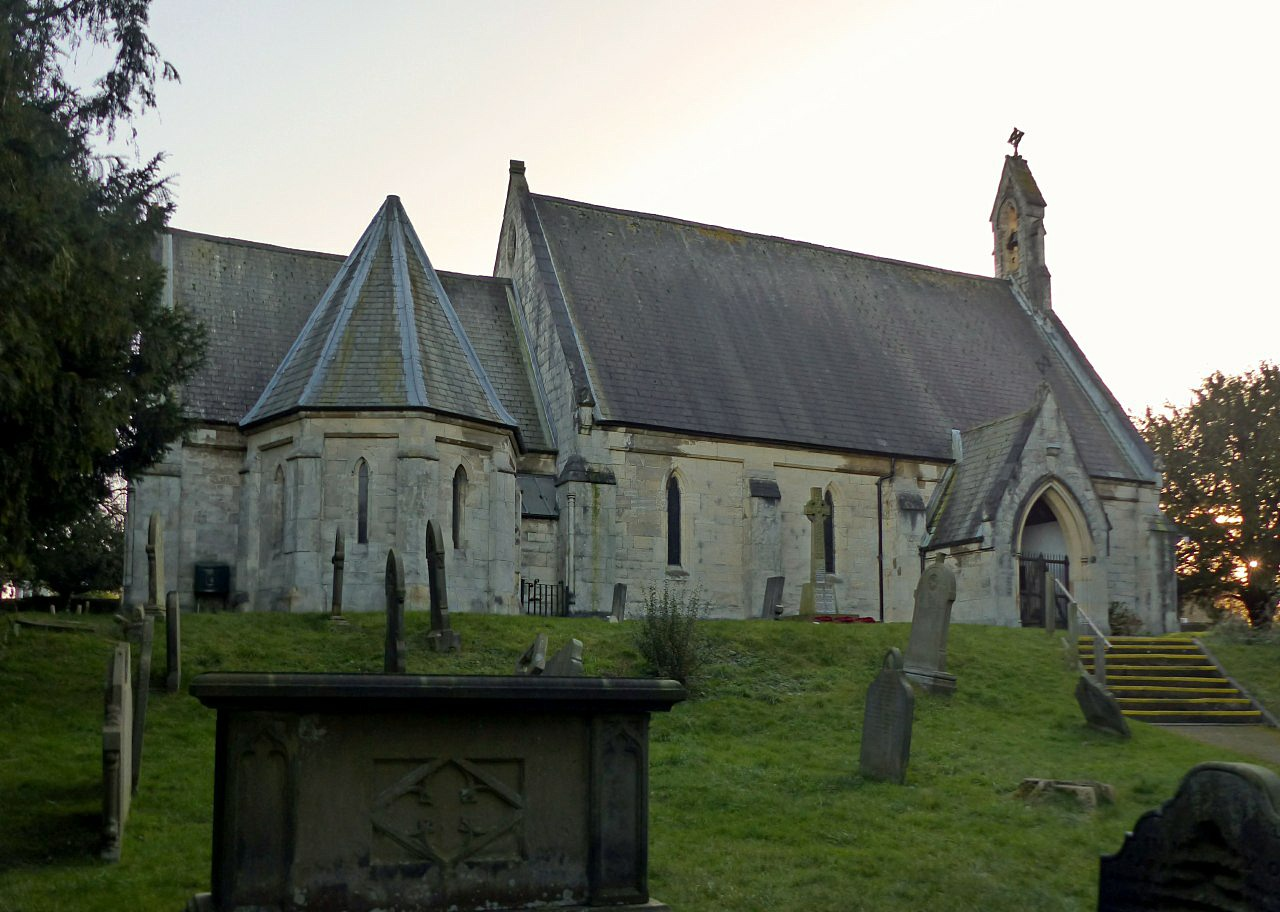
The church, in 2019

St Mary's Church is the parish church of South Milford, a village in North Yorkshire, in England.

An Anglican church was first built in South Milford in 1846. It was designed by George Fowler Jones in the Gothic revival style. Its construction cost £1,900, which was funded by the Gascoignes of Partington, and the Church Building Society. It could accommodate 300 worshippers, and by 1851 had an average attendance of 85 on a Sunday morning, and 130 in the afternoon. It was initially a chapel of ease to All Saints' Church, Sherburn in Elmet, but in 1859 it was given its own parish. A rectory was constructed in 1866, replaced by a new building in 1966, and sold in 1985, when the parish was merged with that of St Wilfrid's Church, Monk Fryston. The church was grade II listed in 1985.

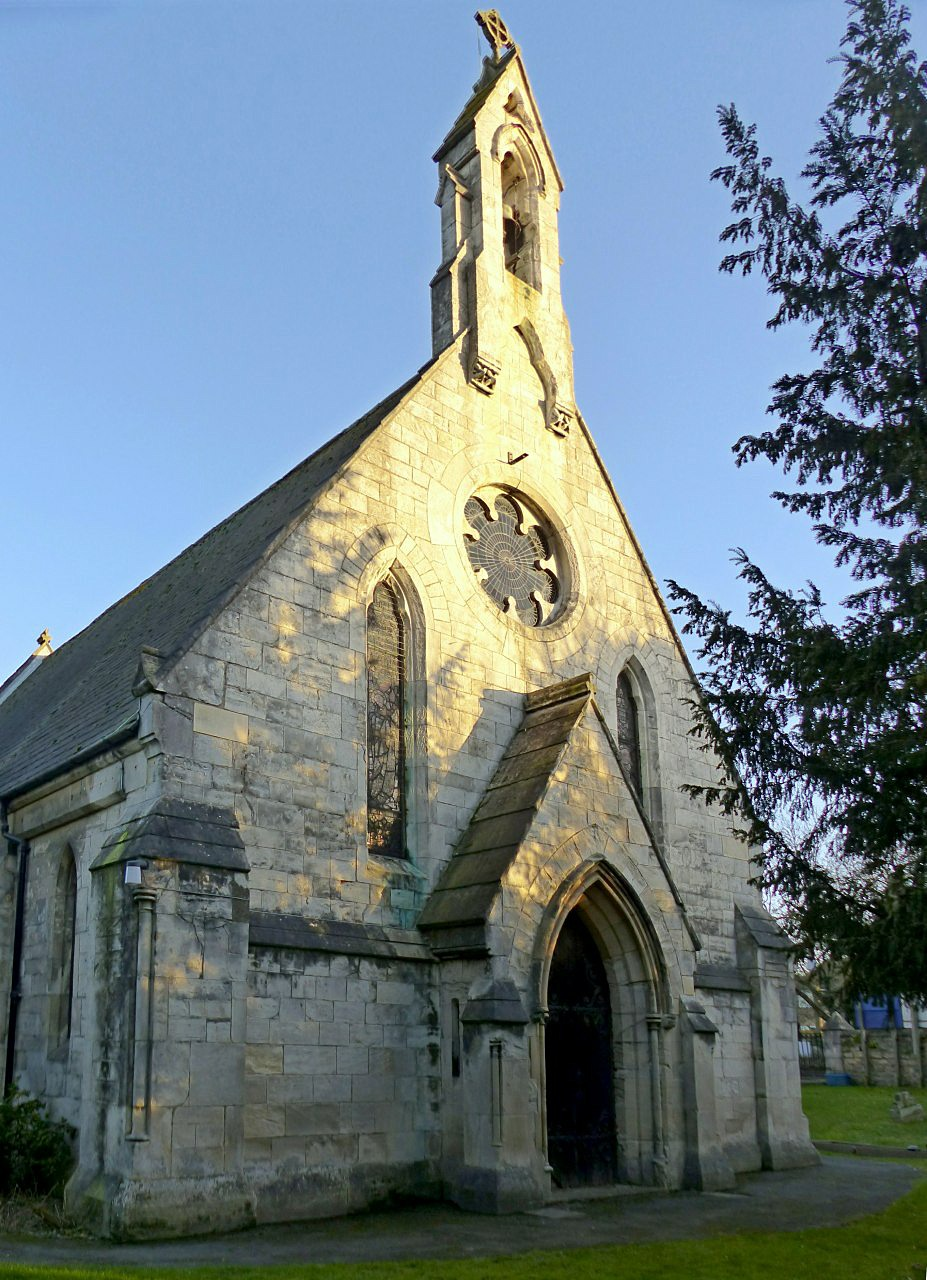
The west front

The church is built of magnesian limestone, with sandstone dressings and a Welsh slate roof. It consists of a nave, a north porch, a chancel, an octagonal north vestry with a pyramidal roof, and another vestry to the south. At the west end is a bell turret, and below it is a rose window. The other windows are lancets with trefoil heads, and at the east end are three stepped lancets.

== See also ==
- Listed buildings in South Milford
