= Richmond Hill Tunnel =

Railway tunnel in Leeds, England

Richmond Hill Tunnel (1834 – 1894)
- Interactive map of Richmond Hill Tunnel (1834 – 1894)

Overview
- Other name: Marsh Lane Tunnel
- Location: Richmond Hill, Leeds, West Yorkshire, England
- Coordinates: 53.795°N 1.522°W

Operation
- Work began: 5 November 1831
- Opened: 1834
- Rebuilt: 1894
- Owner: Leeds and Selby Railway; York and North Midland Railway; North Eastern Railway

Technical
- Design engineer: James Walker (original)
- Length: 700 yards (640 m)
- No. of tracks: 2
- Track gauge: 4 ft 8 1/2 in (1,435 mm) standard gauge
- Tunnel clearance: 17 feet (5.2 m) (original)
- Width: 22 feet (6.7 m) (original)

Richmond Hill Tunnel (1894 – present)
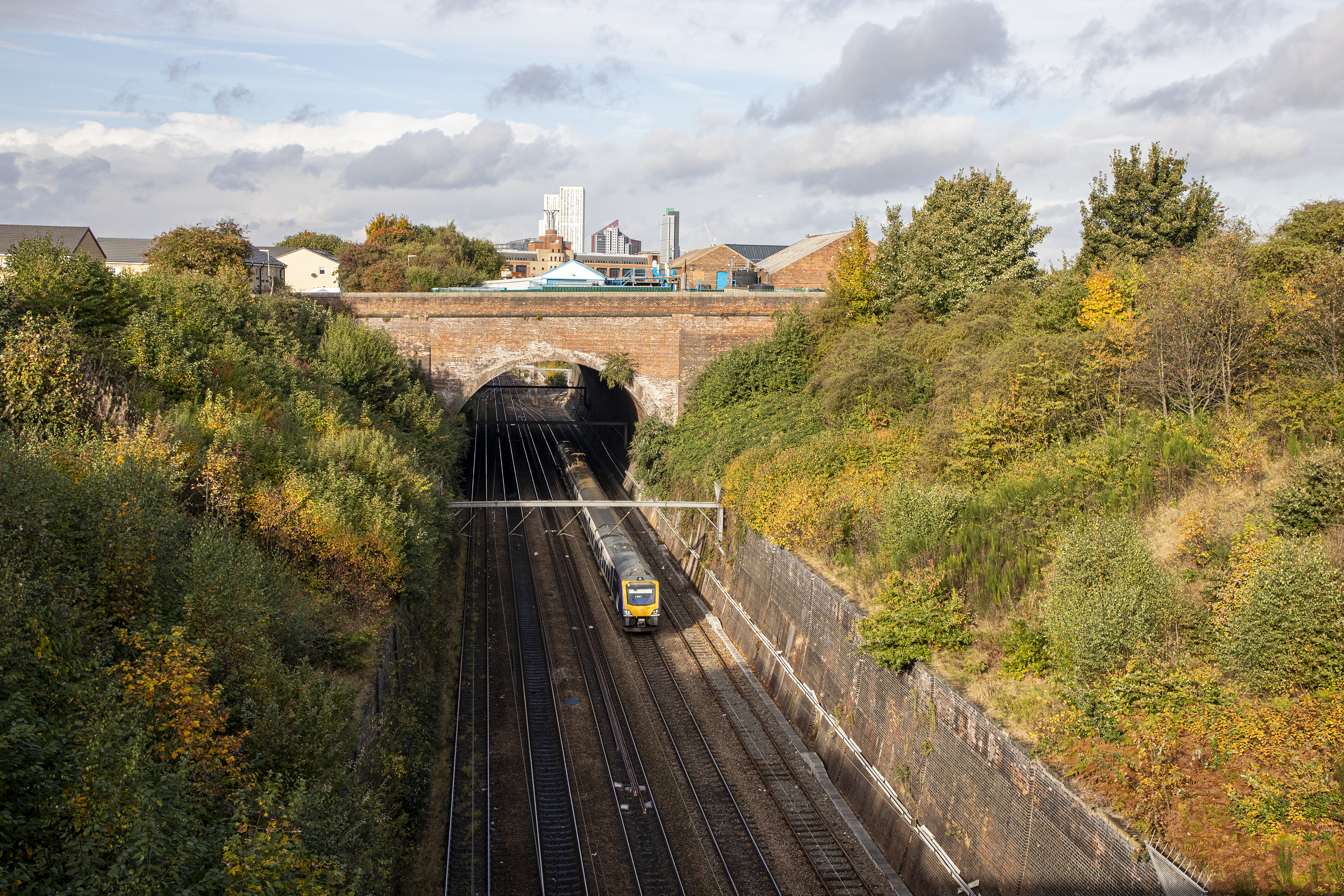
- The shortened Richmond Hill Tunnel in Leeds
- Interactive map of Richmond Hill Tunnel (1894 – present)

Overview
- Other name: Marsh Lane Tunnel
- Location: Richmond Hill, Leeds, West Yorkshire, England
- Status: Open

Operation
- Rebuilt: 1894
- Owner: Network Rail

Technical
- Length: 118 yards (108 m)
- No. of tracks: 5
- Track gauge: 4 ft 8 1/2 in (1,435 mm) standard gauge
- Electrified: Yes
- Width: 60 feet (18 m) (present)

Richmond Hill Tunnel is a railway tunnel to the east of Leeds city centre, in West Yorkshire, England. The tunnel is known to be the first in the world specifically designed to carry passengers to be worked by steam trains rather than a stationary engine. One of the innovative methods employed to reassure passengers going through the lightless tunnel, was to place copper sheets underneath the air shafts which were intended to reflect the light around the tunnel. The original Richmond Hill Tunnel was 700 yards (640 m) long, but in 1894, it was widened into a cutting with a shorter tunnel, which is the existing structure in use today. The present Richmond Hill Tunnel is 118 yards (108 m) long, and is part of the longer Marsh Lane Cutting, which connects the eastward entrance and exit into Leeds railway station to the lines going towards Selby and York.

The railway line through Richmond Hill is part of the TransPennine Line which connects Manchester and Leeds, with Selby, York and Hull.

== History ==
Several schemes were mooted in the 1820s to connect Leeds with Hull, Goole or Selby, using either inclined planes, or a tunnel under Richmond Hill of 1,100 yards (1,000 m) in length. These gained support due to the state of the roads and the monopoly of the canal-owners who were perceived as doing little in the way of improvement. The initial survey between Leeds and Selby was undertaken by George Stephenson, who recommended three inclined planes with stationary engines on the first 8 miles (13 km) out from Leeds. A later survey, undertaken by James Walker, preferred the use of a tunnel underneath Richmond Hill, and the use of steam locomotives throughout. Walker himself stated in his report that

....Richmond Hill will require either a formation of a tunnel eight hundred yards long, or two inclined planes with fixed Engines; [sic] one ascending, the other descending. Of these plans, I have never hesitated in advising the former;- first because a tunnel is likely to be much less objectionable to the owners of the land and buildings upon Richmond Hill; second because the angle of planes there would be so great as to render them dangerous; third, because it is a great and manifest waste of labour, and will prove a serious obstruction to the general utility of the project, to have to drag loads to the top of a hill, for the mere purpose of immediately lowering them again.....

Building of the route started in October 1830, with work on the tunnel starting on 5 November 1831. Initially, there was a delay when the proposal of moving the Leeds terminus was considered. This would have meant avoiding the necessity of a tunnel, as the station at Leeds would be further west than the tunnel, rather than just north of it. The route cut under Richmond Hill was difficult to construct due to the presence of previous coal mining activities in the hill. The tunnel was cut through rock, shale and coal measures, with five different entry points for the digging; one each at the western and eastern ends, with a further three downward shafts from the surface to the top on the tunnel, which was between 70 feet (21 m) and 80 feet (24 m) below. The downward shafts were 10 feet (3 m) in diameter and were kept open to provide light for the tunnel. To enhance this, the contractors placed "sheets of tinned copper", 2 feet 6 inches (0.76 m) square on the space between the two sets of rails at the bottom of each shaft. This was to help reflect the light cast downward, and to alleviate the gloom further, the walls of the tunnel were whitewashed. A reporter from the Leeds Mercury visited the construction, commenting on the "Herculean" strengths of the workers and claiming that a newspaper could be read within the tunnel due to the amount of reflected light.

However, because passengers had not regularly been through tunnels, some were worried about the "stygian depths". One traveller wrote about a journey through the tunnel: "We were immediately enveloped in total darkness, and every one of the carriages filled with smoke and steam to a most annoying degree. Though we were but a few minutes going through, such was the nuisance, we thought it an hour." The engineer, James Walker, appreciated the need to retain the downward shafts, not only for the light they produced, but also the need to ventilate smoke from the tunnel.

The tunnel fell on a gradient of 1-in-300 eastwards (the higher elevation being nearer to Marsh Lane station), was 17 feet (5.2 m) high from centre of tunnel to height above rail, and was 22 feet (6.7 m) wide. Some sources quote the height was 19 feet (5.8 m), but this included the depth of the ballast underneath the rail (2 feet (0.61 m)). The shafts were 23 yards (21 m), 22 yards (20 m), and 19 yards (17 m) deep from west to east respectively. The tunnel was completed in June 1833, though the opening of the line did not occur until September 1834. The inside of the tunnel was laid with two courses of bricks aligned lengthways along the tunnel, but where shale was located, three courses of brickwork were necessary for the extra support. The tunnel was shaped in a slight concave construction, this meant that the width at the springing line (the bottom of the arch), was wider than the width of the tunnel mouth at the rail level. The tunnel mouths were designed with large stone facings, and an open excavation with a "strong wall" of 160 yards (150 m) led up to the western portal of the tunnel mouth. These were not only designed to impress the passengers, but also to reassure them about travelling through the tunnel.

The tunnel was known to be the first that was designed for steam locomotives to work through (although early suggestions mooted horses), and the tunnel was also noted for being the first in the world for which passengers were meant to be taken through. In 1840, all passenger traffic was diverted away from Leeds Marsh Lane railway station by George Hudson, who had leased the Leeds and Selby Railway. Freight was similarly diverted away in 1848, with the reason being that Marsh Lane was an isolated terminus, the Hunslet Lane terminus of the Y&NMR was nearer to Leeds city centre. In 1850, local traffic was restored with through traffic re-instated when the line between Church Fenton and Micklefield was built, and the opening of the line across Leeds to the New station in 1869.

Plans were deposited by the North Eastern Railway (NER) in 1891 to widen the tunnel to accommodate more lines, and also remove much of the tunnel and create a cutting at a cost of over £290,000. This proposed a tunnel length of 125 yards (114 m), and a widening of the cutting (so as to accommodate more lines) to 60-foot (18 m). Work started in December 1892, and a report in the Huddersfield Chronicle states that two workers were crushed to death when a new bridge was being built to replace the road that previously crossed above the now opened out tunnel. By November 1893, seven deaths had been attributed to the opening out works and more than a dozen injuries had occurred. All news reports and official updates issued by the North Eastern Railway referred to the two formations as Marsh Lane Tunnel and Marsh Lane Cutting rather than Richmond Hill.

Throughout the works, most traffic was diverted, but a single line was kept open which was protected by a timber frame, allowing the old tunnel and hill to be taken down. The work to shorten the tunnel, widen and lengthen the cutting, was completed in 1895. The NER built replacement houses for those above the old tunnel structure which needed to be demolished for the opening out works. The removal of the tunnel left the cutting with several bridges crossing it, many of which are still in use today.

The current 'tunnel' area of Richmond Hill is listed as being 118 yards (108 m), (or 5 chains (330 ft; 100 m)), with five lines running through the tunnel and Marsh Lane Cutting, which was part of the tunnel before it was opened out. Four of the lines are electrified, and the fifth is a goods loop to a stone terminal on the original site of Marsh Lane terminus. The lines through the tunnel and cutting were electrified at 25kV in 1989, as part of the East Coast Main Line electrification scheme, and allow for empty stock transfers between Leeds railway station, and the depot at Neville Hill. Besides allowing trains access and egress from the depot at Neville Hill, the line is an important passenger line for TransPennine Express trains.
