= South Milford =

Village and civil parish in North Yorkshire, England

Coordinates: 53°46′38″N 1°15′00″W

- Village
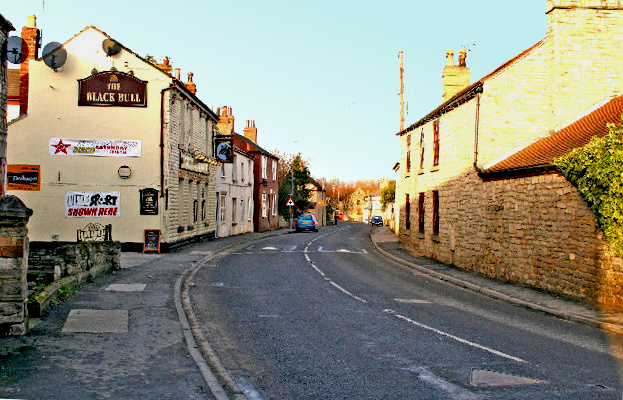
- Village street

- Location within North Yorkshire
- Population: 2,368 (2011 census)
- OS grid reference: SE 495 315
- Civil parish: South Milford
- Unitary authority: North Yorkshire
- Ceremonial county: North Yorkshire
- Region: Yorkshire and the Humber
- Country: England
- Sovereign state: United Kingdom
- Post town: LEEDS
- Postcode district: LS25
- Dialling code: 01977
- Police: North Yorkshire
- Fire: North Yorkshire
- Ambulance: Yorkshire
- UK Parliament: Selby

South Milford is a village and civil parish in the county of North Yorkshire, England. The civil parish includes the hamlet of Lumby, located south-west of the main village.

The village was historically part of the West Riding of Yorkshire until 1974.

Traditionally an agricultural village, the population has recently boomed due to housing development. South Milford is now generally considered a commuter village for nearby towns and cities because of the local motorway network, including the A1(M), M1 and M62. Still, South Milford maintains links with the local farming community.

== History ==
Milford is first recorded in 963 as on niy senford, which means Mylenforda, or mill on the ford. The name derives from Anglo-Saxon, and though it predates the Domesday Book, it is not explicitly mentioned, though North Milford near Kirkby Wharfe is.

The mill was located in the north of the parish on Mill Dike, the body of water which separates South Milford from Sherburn. The watercourse runs from Micklefield to Sherburn and eventually falls into the Ouse at Cawood.

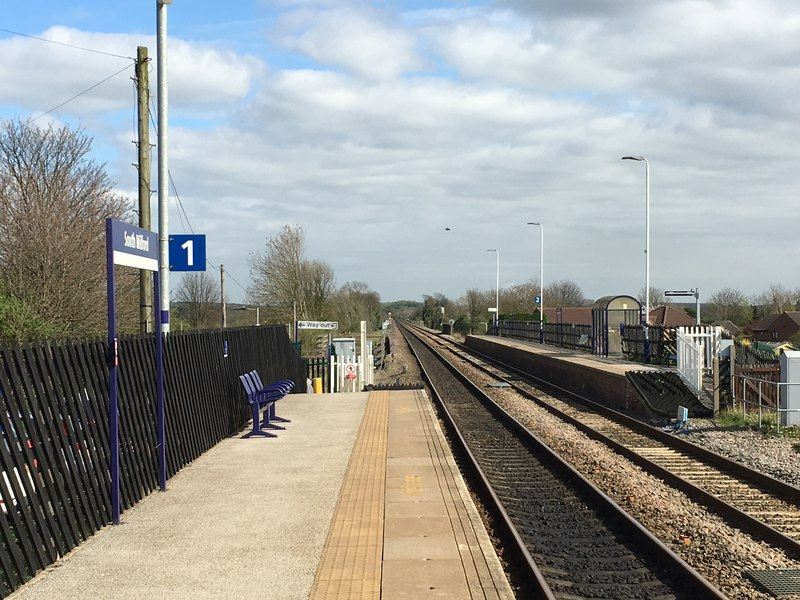
South Milford railway station

South Milford is served by South Milford railway station, part of the Leeds and Selby Railway - a line that runs west/east across the north of the village. It has been in operation since 1834 and provides a service between Leeds, Selby and Hull. South Milford lies at the convergence of several lines, and was an important staging post in coal traffic between the pits and the power stations in the Aire Valley. Another station, Milford Junction, was located on lines running north/south, but this closed in 1904, being replaced by Monk Fryston, which closed in 1959.

=== Steeton Hall ===
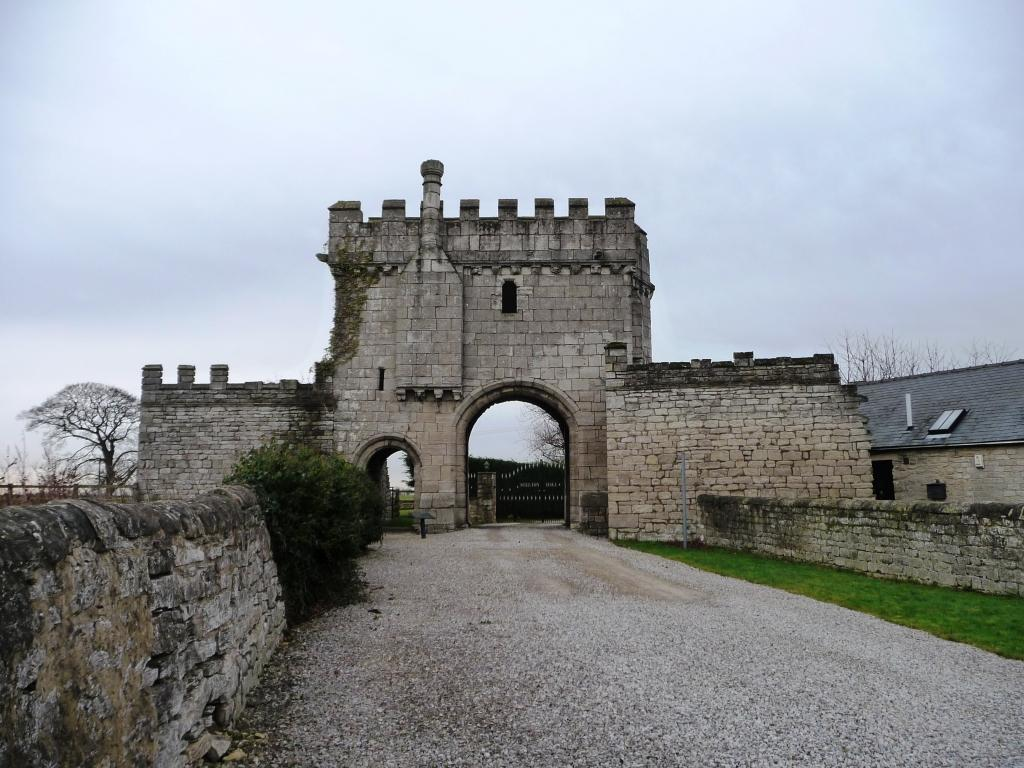
A view of Steeton Hall Gateway

Steeton Hall Gateway is a listed ancient monument and is protected by English Heritage. It is situated about 1.5 miles (2.4 km) west of South Milford. The gateway originally served a large hall, which was demolished and replaced by a house, which has since been converted into several dwellings. The gateway dates from the 15th century, and is one of four such structures which marked the corners of the estate. It has two arched passages, the large one in the centre to allow horsemen and carriages through and the smaller one to the left for footmen.

There are a spiral staircase which leads into a large room above the arch and a number of shields and coats of arms surrounding the structure.

Steeton Hall Gateway has been described as a "fair and stately structure in the brave days of old".

== Governance ==
South Milford was historically in the wapentake of Barkston Ash in the West Riding of Yorkshire. The village was in the parish of Sherburn which lies to the north, but in 1859 was made its own ecclesiastical parish with lands from Sherburn-in-Elmet and Monk Fryston. In 1974 the area was moving from the West Riding into North Yorkshire. From 1974 to 2023 it was part of the Selby District, it is now administered by the unitary North Yorkshire Council. The area is represented at Parliament as part of the Selby UK Parliament constituency.

The population of the parish at the 2011 census was 2,368, and in 2015, North Yorkshire County Council estimated that it had increased to 2,700.

== Notable people ==
- Joseph Hirst, architect, born in the village.

== See also ==
- Listed buildings in South Milford
