= Burton Salmon railway station =

Disused railway station in Burton Salmon, North Yorkshire, England

Burton Salmon
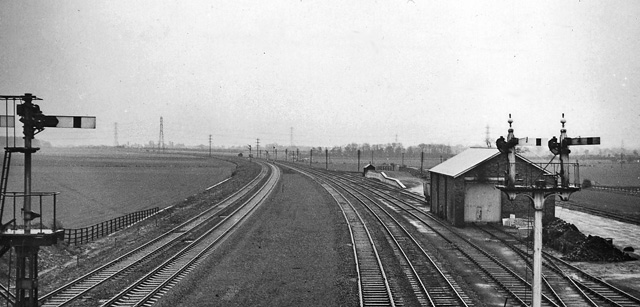
- The site of the station in 1961

General information
- Location: Burton Salmon, North Yorkshire; England
- Coordinates: 53.7455°N 1.2586°W
- Grid reference: SE489279

Other information
- Status: Disused

History
- Original company: York and North Midland Railway
- Pre-grouping: North Eastern Railway
- Post-grouping: London and North Eastern Railway; British Railways (North Eastern Region)

Key dates
- 11 May 1840: Opened
- 14 September 1959: Closed to passengers
- 3 June 1968: Closed to goods
Location

Burton Salmon railway station served the village of Burton Salmon, North Yorkshire, England, from 1840 to 1959 on the York and North Midland Railway.

== History ==
The station was opened on 11 May 1840 by the York and North Midland Railway. It closed to passengers on 14 September 1959 and closed to goods on 3 June 1968.

Preceding station	Disused railways	Following station
Castleford; Line and station open	North Eastern Railway; York and North Midland Railway	Milford Junction; 1840–1904; Line open, station closed
Ferrybridge; Line open, station closed	North Eastern Railway; York and North Midland Railway	Milford Junction; 1840–1904; Line open, station closed
Castleford; Line and station open	North Eastern Railway; York and North Midland Railway	Monk Fryston; 1904–1959; Line open, station closed
Ferrybridge; Line open, station closed	North Eastern Railway; York and North Midland Railway	Monk Fryston; 1904–1959; Line open, station closed
