= St Mary's Church, Hambleton =

Church in North Yorkshire, England

Coordinates: 53°46′17″N 1°09′45″W

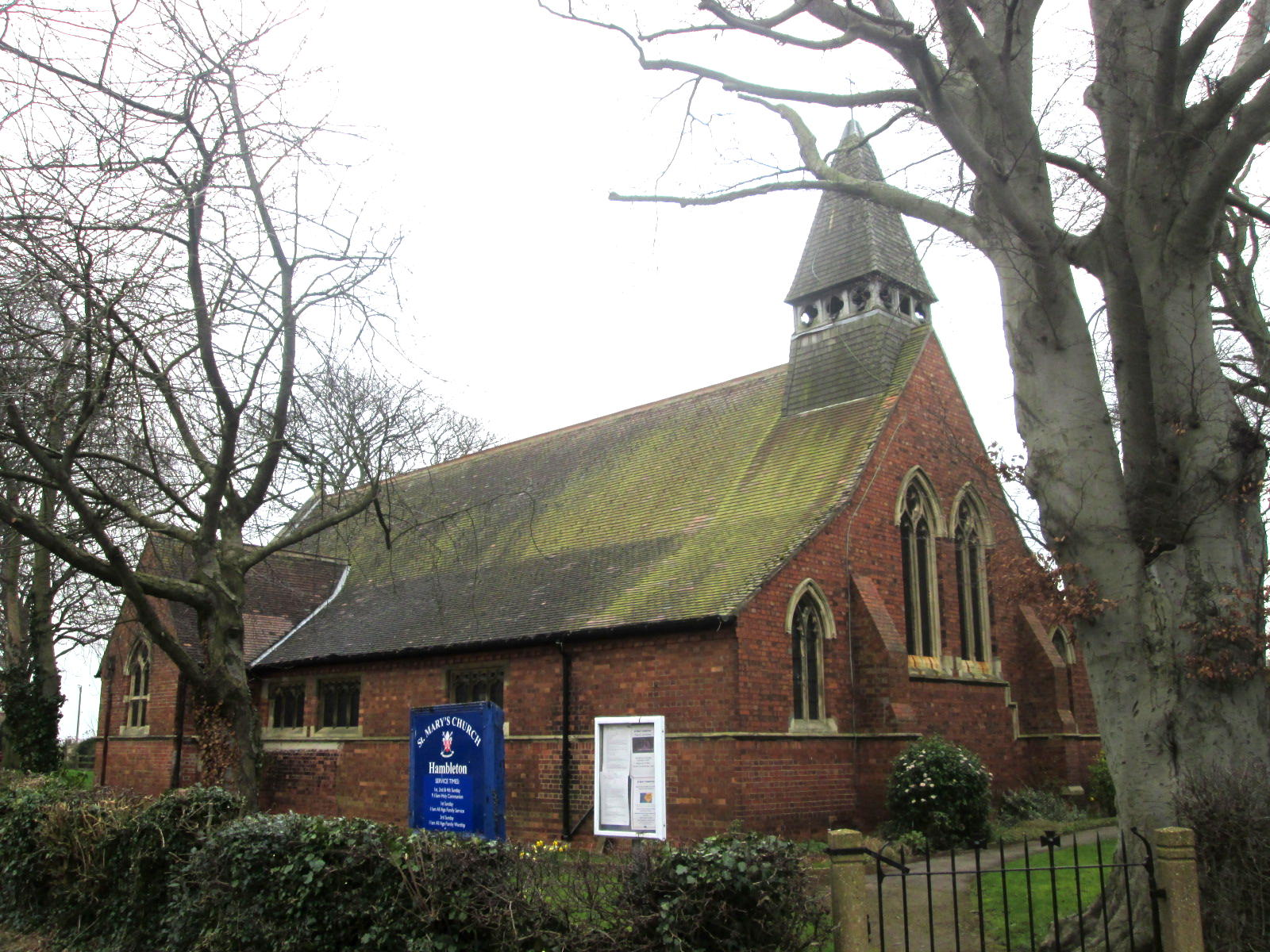
The church, in 2017

St Mary's Church is the parish church of Hambleton, a village in North Yorkshire, in England.

A chantry chapel dedicated to Our Lady was constructed in Hambleton in about 1307, and was last recorded in 1536. Its site is now lost. The village was long in the parish of St Wilfrid's Church, Brayton. In 1882, a chapel of ease was constructed in Hambleton. It was designed by John Loughborough Pearson in the Decorated Gothic style, at a cost of £2,012 1s 9d. It could seat 214 worshippers. An organ was installed in 1885. In 1915, the church was given its own parish, and in 1949 some pews were removed to create a chapel and vestry. The church was grade II listed in 2021.

The church is built of red brick with stone dressings and a red tile roof. It consists of a nave with flanking aisles, a southwest porch, and a chancel with a north vestry. On the west gable is a timber-framed bellcote, on each side of which are three quatrefoil bell openings, and it has a pyramidal shingled roof with a metal cross. Inside, there are pine pews, and a font brought from St Wilfrid, with a cover which came from St Michael's Church, Cottingley. Several windows contained stained glass, including a memorial window of 1920 by Christopher Whall. In the chancel is an oak frieze carved by George Walker Milburn.

== See also ==
- Listed buildings in Hambleton, Selby
