= Listed buildings in Burton Salmon =

Burton Salmon is a civil parish in the county of North Yorkshire, England. It contains five listed buildings that are recorded in the National Heritage List for England. All the listed buildings are designated at Grade II, the lowest of the three grades, which is applied to "buildings of national importance and special interest". The parish contains the village of Burton Salmon and the surrounding area, and the listed buildings consist of a farmhouse, associated farm buildings, two milestones and a war memorial.

== Buildings ==
Name and location	Photograph	Date	Notes
Poole Manor Farmhouse; 53.73647°N 1.25518°W		Mid to late 17th century (probable)	The farmhouse is in rendered magnesian limestone, with stone dressings, a floor band, and a pantile roof with stone coping and kneelers. There are two storeys and four bays. On the front are two doorways with quoined surrounds, and a mix of casement and horizontally-sliding sash windows. At the rear is a four-light window with chamfered mullions and a hood.
Farm building range, Poole Manor Farm; 53.73672°N 1.25501°W		Late 17th century (probable)	The farm building range is in rendered limestone, and has a roof of pantile and stone slate with stone coping and kneelers. There are two storeys, an L-shaped plan, and a left range of five bays. The openings include windows, a garage door with an armorial shield above, stable doors, a wagon entrance, and vents.
Milestone near Betteras Hill Road; 53.75269°N 1.25359°W		19th century	The milestone is on the east side of the A162 road, and is about 1 metre (3 ft 3 in) high. It is in stone with a cast-iron front, and has a triangular plan and a curved top. On the top is inscribed "TADCASTER & DONCASTER ROAD" and "BURTON SALMON", on the north side are the distances to Doncaster and Pontefract, and on the south side to York and Tadcaster.
Milestone near Burton Salmon Lane; 53.73884°N 1.26329°W		19th century	The milestone is on the west side of the A162 road, and is about 1.5 metres (4 ft 11 in) high. It is in stone with a cast-iron front, and has a triangular plan and a curved top. On the top is inscribed "TADCASTER & DONCASTER ROAD" and "BURTON SALMON", on the north side are the distances to Doncaster, Pontefract and Ferrybridge, and on the south side to York and Tadcaster.
War memorial 53.74419°N 1.25955°W		1925	The war memorial stands by a crossroads, and is in the form of a gabled lych gate. It is built in oak, on a concrete base, with a slate roof. The rear wall is infilled, and contains memorial plaques, and the other sides are enclosed by low balustrades. The tie-beams have inscriptions. The plaques also have inscriptions, and the contain names of those lost in the two World Wars.
