= Listed buildings in Hambleton, Selby =

Hambleton is a civil parish in the former Selby district of North Yorkshire, England. It contains six listed buildings that are recorded in the National Heritage List for England. All the listed buildings are designated at Grade II, the lowest of the three grades, which is applied to "buildings of national importance and special interest". The parish contains the village of Hambleton and the surrounding area. The listed buildings consist of four houses, a milestone and a church.

== Buildings ==
Name and location	Photograph	Date	Notes
Garth House; 53.76844°N 1.16621°W		Early to mid 18th century (probable)	The house is in brownish-red brick on a plinth, with stone dressings, a three-course floor band, an eaves band, and a pantile roof with tumbled-in gable ends. There are two storeys and three bays. In the centre is a gabled porch, and the windows are sashes with segmental heads under elliptical arches.
Walmsley House; 53.77068°N 1.16181°W		1816	The house is in gault brick with stone dressings, a modillion eaves cornice and a hipped slate roof. There are two storeys and three bays. Steps lead to a central doorway with pilasters, a patterned radial fanlight, a triglyph and metope frieze, and a pediment. The windows are casements with flat brick arches.
Milestone; 53.76871°N 1.17692°W	—	Early 19th century (probable)	The milestone is on the south side of the A63 road. It is in stone with a cast iron plaque, and about 0.75 metres (2 ft 6 in) high, with a triangular plan and a rounded top. On the top is inscribed "SELBY AND LEEDS" and "TURNPIKE ROAD", on the east face is the distance to Leeds, and on the west face the distance to Selby.
22 Main Road; 53.77073°N 1.16431°W		Early to mid 19th century	The house is in brownish-red brick with stone dressings, a floor band, an eaves band, a modillion eaves cornice, and a hipped slate roof, flat on the top, and with stone coping on the windows. There are two storeys and three bays, and single-storey single-bay wings. The central doorway has a fanlight, a cornice, and a hood on engaged and freestanding pilasters. The windows are sashes with channelled wedge lintels and keystones., and at the rear is a stair window with radial glazing in the head.
The Old Vicarage; 53.76976°N 1.16040°W		1834	The house is in gault brick with stone dressings, a sill band, an eaves cornice, and a hipped blue slate roof with a flat top. There are two storeys and three bays, and a later range on the left with one storey and two bays. In the centre, steps lead up to a doorcase with engaged Doric columns, a frieze with triglyphs and metopes, and an open pediment, and a doorway with a patterned radial fanlight. The windows are sashes with gauged brick flat arches.
St Mary's Church; 53.77138°N 1.16251°W		1881–82	The church, designed by J. Loughborough Pearson in Decorated style, is in red brick with stone dressings and a red tile roof. It consists of a nave with flanking aisles, a southwest porch, and a chancel with a north vestry. On the west gable is a timber-framed bellcote, on each side of which are three quatrefoil bell openings, and it has a pyramidal shingled roof with a metal cross.
