= Marsh Lane =

Marsh Lane may refer to:

Places

- Marsh Lane, Derbyshire, in England
- Marsh Lane, Gloucestershire, in England
- Marsh Lane, Lincolnshire, in England
- Marsh Lane, Oxford, in England

Railway stations

- Marsh Lane railway station, Leeds
- Marsh Lane & Strand Road station, now known as Bootle New Strand railway station

Roadways

- Marsh Lane (Dallas)
