= Steeton Hall =

Building in South Milford, North Yorkshire, England

Coordinates: 53.7768°N 1.2681°W

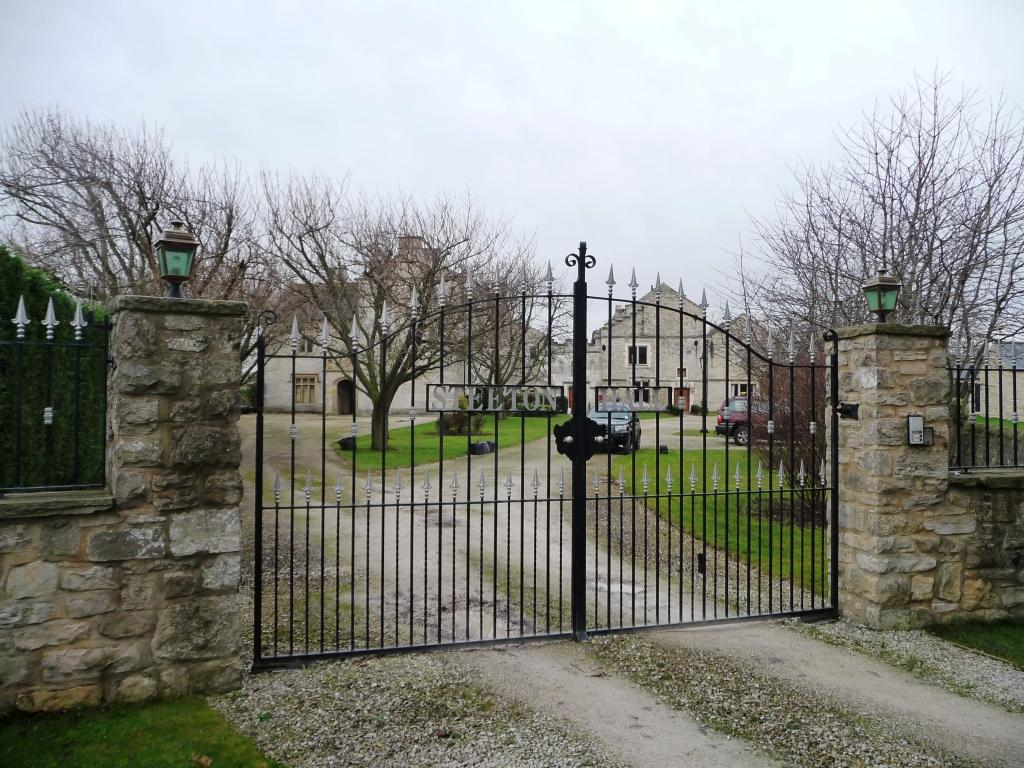
The building, in 2011

Steeton Hall is a historic building near South Milford, a village in North Yorkshire, in England.

The Reygate family possessed the manor of Steeton from the mid 12th century. William de Reygate renewed a licence for a chapel at Steeton in 1342, and he may have built Steeton Hall that year. In or around the 1360s, a gatehouse was constructed, to govern access through the property's surrounding wall. The house was heavily altered around 1642 and again in the 19th century. The surrounding wall fell into ruin and now survives only as a low bank, while other earthworks represent platforms of demolished ancillary buildings and a dried-up fishpond. The gatehouse became state-owned in 1948, and is now an English Heritage property, while the house remains in private ownership. The hall was grade I listed in 1952, and the gatehouse separately listed at grade I in 1967. The site and gatehouse are also a scheduled monument.

== Hall ==
The house is built of magnesian limestone, with sandstone dressings and roofs of tile and Welsh slate, and it has a complex cruciform plan. The main block has two storeys and windows of various types. The right range has two buildings with an entrance bay between them, two storeys, and a single-storey addition to the right. The entrance bay has two storeys and an embattled parapet. It contains a doorway with a basket arch, a moulded archivolt and a hood mould, and above it is a blocked window with a pointed arch flanked by niches. At the rear is a three-storey pigeoncote. The left range has an embattled porch. Inside, there is ribbed vaulting and a 14th-century piscina.

== Gatehouse ==
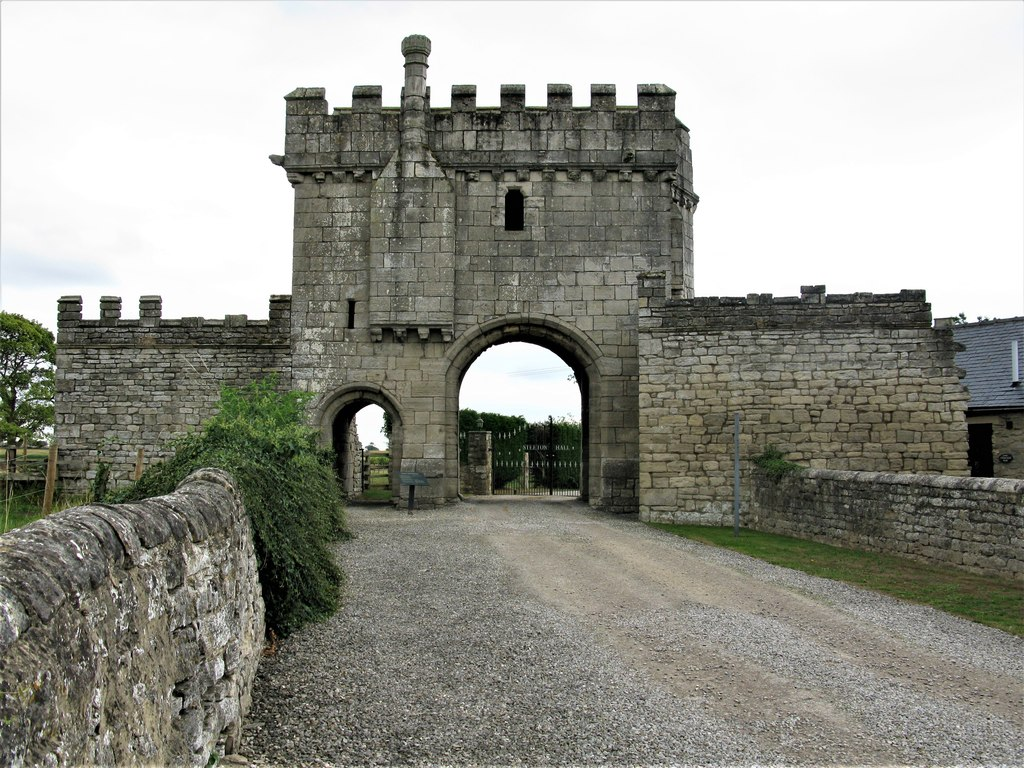
The gatehouse

The gatehouse and flanking walls are built of magnesian limestone with embattled parapets. The gatehouse contains a round-headed carriage arch with a ribbed vault, and to the left is a smaller round-headed pedestrian arch with a barrel vault, both with a double-chamfered surround. Above is a projecting chimney stack on four corbels with heads, and an octagonal chimney. To the left is a slit vent, to the right is a shouldered window with a chamfered surround, and above are gargoyles. At the rear are two doorways approached by steps, an ogee-headed window with a chamfered surround, and a corbel table. The walls are about 5 metres (16 ft) in height and extend for about 4 metres (13 ft).

== See also ==
- Grade I listed buildings in North Yorkshire (district)
- Listed buildings in South Milford
