= Sherburn-in-Elmet railway station =

Railway station in North Yorkshire, England

Sherburn-in-Elmet
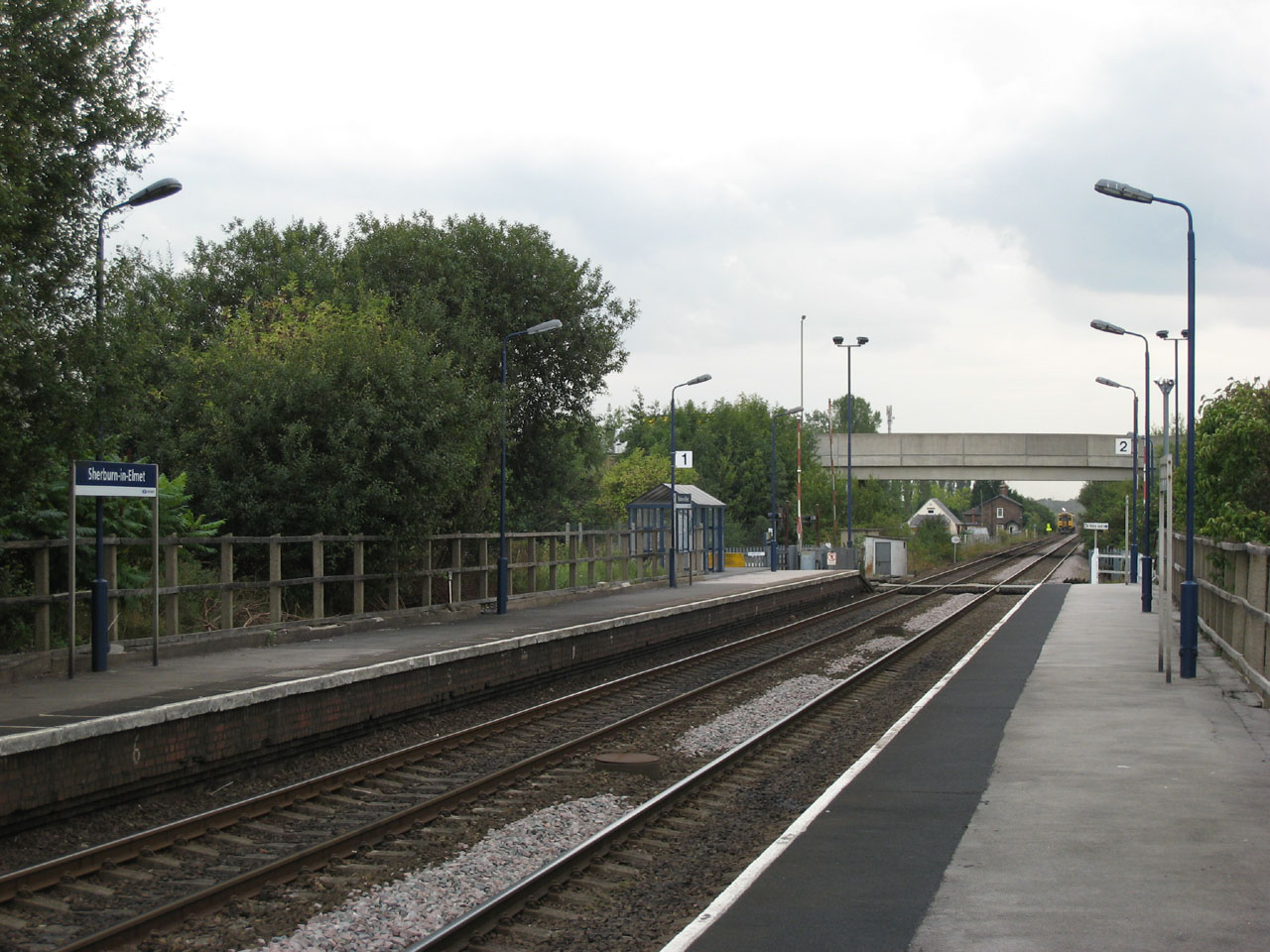
- View looking south

General information
- Location: Sherburn in Elmet, North Yorkshire; England
- Coordinates: 53.797400°N 1.232800°W
- Grid reference: SE506337
- Managed by: Northern Trains
- Platforms: 2

Other information
- Station code: SIE
- Classification: DfT category F2

Key dates
- 1840: opened
- 13 September 1965: Closed
- 9 July 1984: Reopened

Passengers
- 2020/21: ▼19,078
- 2021/22: ▲70,994
- 2022/23: ▲83,266
- 2023/24: ▲0.100 million
- 2024/25: ▲0.122 million
Location
Notes
- Passenger statistics from the Office of Rail and Road

Sherburn-in-Elmet railway station serves the town of Sherburn in Elmet in North Yorkshire, England. The station is located approximately 1 mile (1.6 km) from the town centre.

The railway through Sherburn-in-Elmet was opened in 1840 by the York and North Midland Railway. The station was closed on 13 September 1965 but reopened in 1984 by British Rail with local authority support.

Sherburn-in-Elmet is on both the Dearne Valley Line and the Hull-York Line towards Selby. Trains to/from the latter use the curve south of the station to the former Leeds and Selby Railway at Gascoigne Wood Junction, which was opened just a few months after the main Y&NMR route. This line became the main rail route between Hull and York after the route via Market Weighton and Beverley fell victim to the Beeching Axe in November 1965, though many of its trains were in turn diverted via the newly constructed north curve at Hambleton and the East Coast Main Line Selby Deviation when this opened in 1983. Since the mid-1990s though, several Hull - York trains have reverted to the old route to provide Sherburn with commuter links to and from York in the wake of cutbacks to the Dearne Valley line timetable (this had seven trains each way when the station reopened in 1984, but now has only three - see below) and avoid the increasingly busy ECML. Since the winter 2023 timetable change, a small number of TransPennine Express services between York, Castleford and Manchester Piccadilly pass through the station each day apart from Sundays (the first such timetabled trains since January 1970). However, they do not stop here.

== Facilities ==
The station is unstaffed and has waiting shelters on each platform (but no other permanent buildings). Tickets must be bought in advance online, or from the Ticket Vending Machine (TVM) located inside the waiting shelter on the York-bound platform. Train running information is provided by timetable posters and telephone (a payphone is located on platform 2). The two platforms are linked by a barrier level crossing formerly used by road traffic - wheelchair users are advised not to use this due to gaps in the boards. There are access ramps to both platforms.

== Services ==
On Mondays to Saturdays, there are now eighteen trains per day to York on a basic hourly frequency - these mostly run from Bridlington via Hull and Selby, though three come from Sheffield via the Dearne Valley Line. A similar service level operates southbound, with thirteen trains to Selby, Hull and Bridlington, plus three to Sheffield. Most of the extra trains call in the afternoon and evening, giving the station a much better service at those times.

On Sundays, there are eight trains to Hull, one to Selby and nine to York. No services run to or from Sheffield, though a single rail-replacement bus to Pontefract and Moorthorpe stops to pick up only in the early evening. This connects at Moorthorpe with a Leeds to Sheffield train. A balancing northbound service also runs but calls here only to set down passengers from the south.

| Preceding station | National Rail | Following station |
|---|---|---|
| Pontefract Baghill | Northern Trains Dearne Valley Line | Church Fenton |
| Selby | Northern Trains Hull to York Line | Church Fenton |
Disused railways
| Milford Junction Line open, station closed | North Eastern Railway York and North Midland Railway | Church Fenton Line and station open |
| Gascoigne Wood Junction Line open, station closed | North Eastern Railway York and North Midland Railway | Church Fenton Line and station open |
