= Burton Salmon =

Village and civil parish in North Yorkshire, England

Coordinates: 53.74140°N 1.25540°W

- Location within North Yorkshire
- Population: 416 (2011 census)
- OS grid reference: SE492274
  - London: 160 mi (260 km) SSE
- Civil parish: Burton Salmon
- Unitary authority: North Yorkshire
- Ceremonial county: North Yorkshire
- Region: Yorkshire and the Humber
- Country: England
- Sovereign state: United Kingdom
- Post town: LEEDS
- Postcode district: LS25
- Police: North Yorkshire
- Fire: North Yorkshire
- Ambulance: Yorkshire

Burton Salmon is a village and civil parish in the county of North Yorkshire, England, close to the border with West Yorkshire, and approximately 3 miles (5 km) north from Knottingley, on the A162 road. According to the 2001 Census the parish had a population of 419, reducing slightly to 416 at the 2011 Census.

It was historically part of the West Riding of Yorkshire until 1974. From 1974 to 2023 it was part of the Selby District, it is now administered by the unitary North Yorkshire Council.

The village primary school is Burton Salmon Community Primary School. There is also a public house, The Plough Inn, dating from the 17th century, and a Methodist chapel.

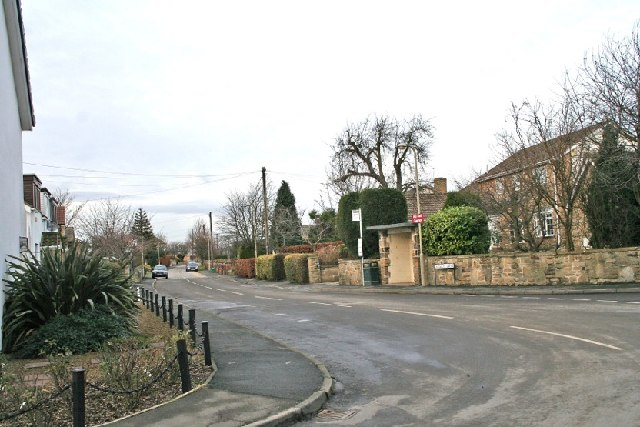
Ledgate Lane, Burton Salmon

== Toponymy ==
The place name "Burton Salmon" is formed of two elements. The first originates in Old English and translates as "farmstead of the Britons" (Brettas, genitive Bretta) plus the word tūn, meaning "farmstead, village, settlement". The second element, "Salmon" is a manorial affix, derived from the name Salamone, that of a man who held lands in the area in the 13th century. Although not mentioned in the Domesday Book, the village was recorded as Brettona circa 1160, before the name of the estate holder was appended, and again as Burton Salamon in 1516.

== See also ==
- Listed buildings in Burton Salmon
