= Milford Junction railway station =

Former railway station in North Yorkshire, England

Coordinates: 53.7710°N 1.2375°W

Milford Junction
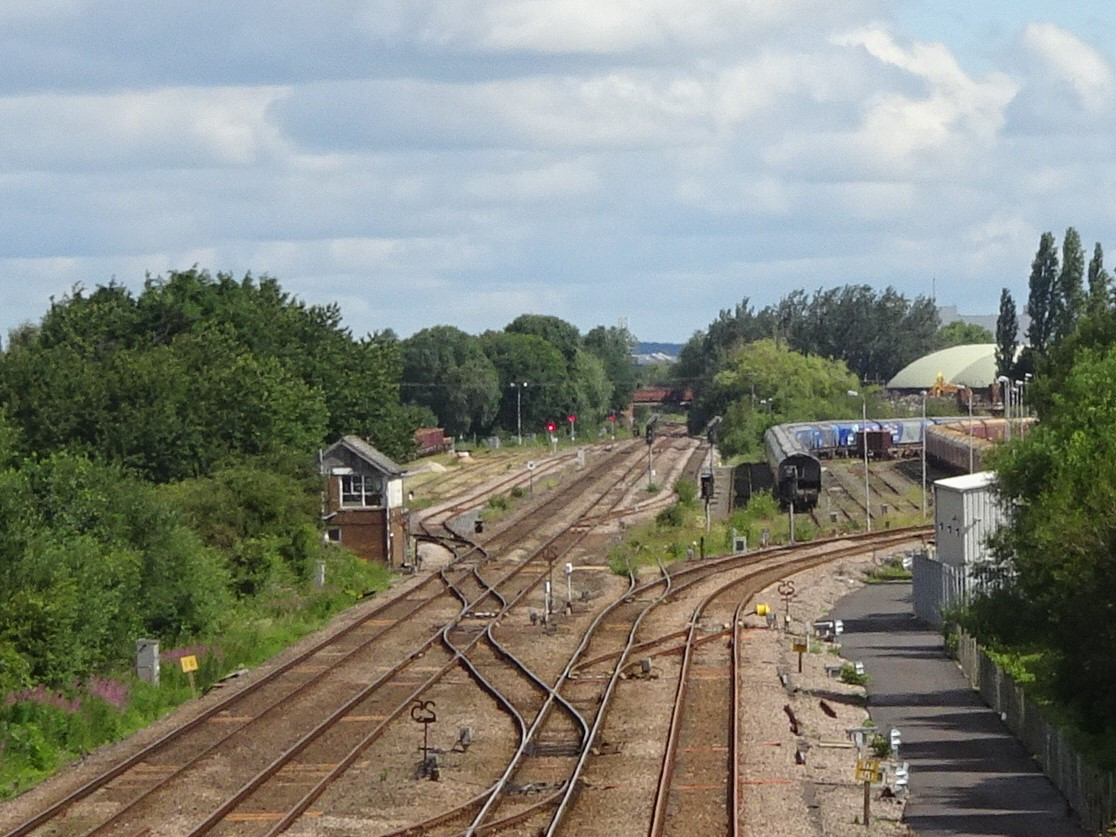
- Station site in July 2020 showing Milford Sidings

General information
- Location: South Milford, North Yorkshire; England

Other information
- Status: Disused

History
- Original company: York and North Midland Railway
- Pre-grouping: NER

Key dates
- 1840: Opened
- 1904: Closed
Location

Milford Junction railway station was a railway station near to Milford Junction on the York and North Midland Railway south of the south-east connecting chord of 1840 between that railway and the Leeds and Selby Railway. The station closed on 1 October 1904, but the site remained in use for locomotive swapping. The station buildings were demolished in 1960.

== See also ==
- The film Brief Encounter and the one-act play upon which it was based Still Life were both set in a station called Milford Junction. The railway station scenes in the film were actually shot in Carnforth railway station in Lancashire.

Preceding station	Disused railways	Following station
Burton Salmon	NER; York and North Midland Railway	Sherburn-in-Elmet; Line and station open
Burton Salmon	NER; York and North Midland Railway	Gascoigne Wood Junction; Line open, station closed
