= Leeds Marsh Lane railway station =

Disused railway station in West Yorkshire, England

Leeds Marsh Lane
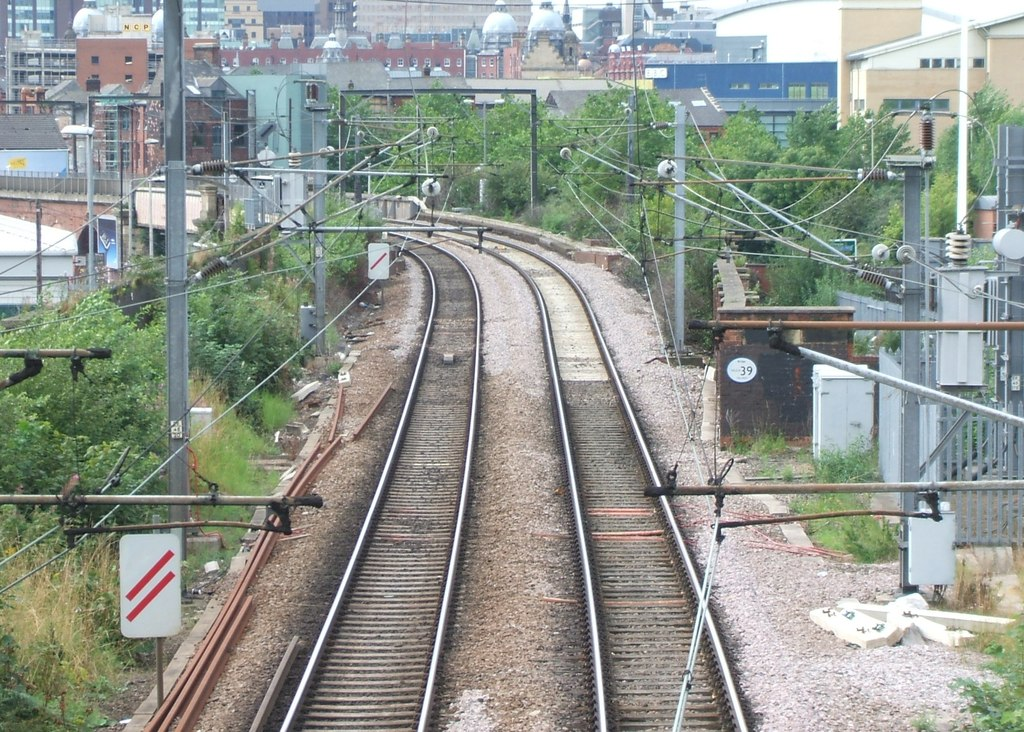
- Leeds Marsh Lane railway station Site

General information
- Location: Leeds, City of Leeds; England
- Coordinates: 53.7967°N 1.5292°W

Other information
- Status: Disused

History
- Original company: Leeds and Selby Railway
- Pre-grouping: North Eastern Railway
- Post-grouping: London and North Eastern Railway

Key dates
- 22 September 1834: Station opened
- 9 November 1840: Closed
- November 1850: Reopened
- 1 April 1869: Resited
- 15 September 1958: Closed
Location

Marsh Lane railway station was built as the Leeds terminus of the Leeds and Selby Railway. The combined passenger and goods station opened in 1834. During the construction of the extension of the Leeds and Selby Line into central Leeds in the 1860s the station was demolished, and replaced with a large goods station and a separate through passenger station.

In 2019, councillors at Leeds City Council suggested in the local media that serious discussions were underway about reopening the station as the city's second major railway station.

== History and description ==
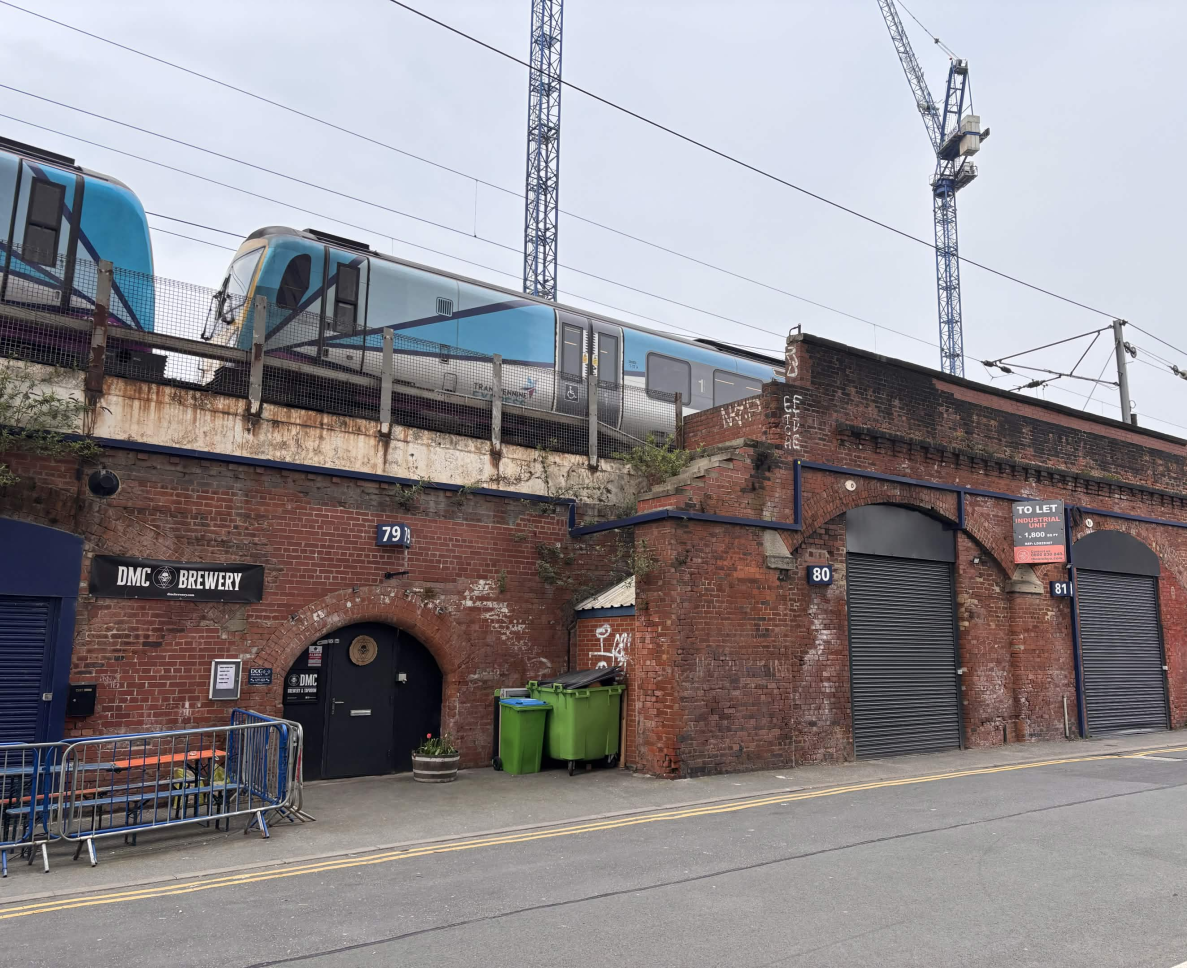
The old station platform from below.

=== Leeds and Selby station (1834–1863) ===
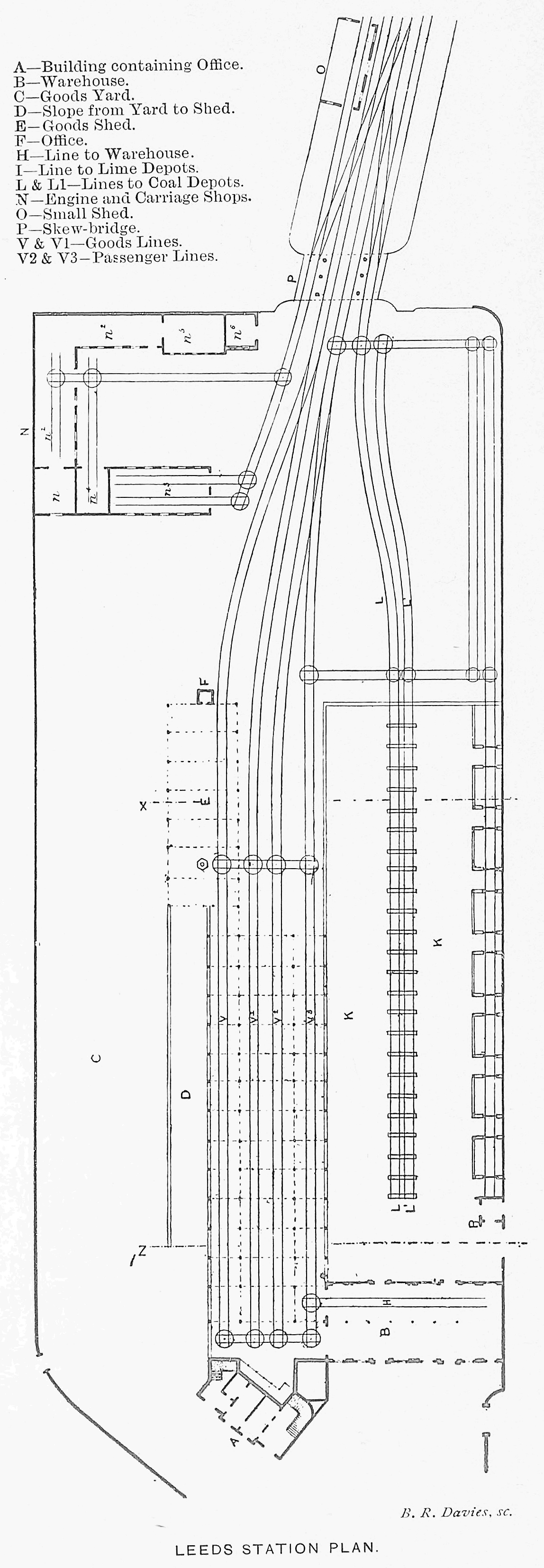
Marsh Lane station, c. 1842 (up is east) NB the diagram is schematic in that the walls of the main shed were not parallel. (Note: The main shed was approximately 197 feet (60 m) long and varied from 80 to 60 feet (24 to 18 m) wide. The wider part was at the west end.)

The station was built as the Leeds terminus of the Leeds and Selby Railway which opened in 1834. The first official train to run on the line started from Marsh Lane at around 6.30 am on 22 September 1834.

In 1842 the station consisted of a two-storey office building, containing a booking office on the ground floor, with the railway level with the first floor. The main station shed had four lines of track, serving both goods and passenger trains; the building was roofed and supported on cast iron columns. The passenger lines lacked raised platforms, unlike other stations on the line. Goods were handled at a warehouse at the west end of the station, adjacent to the offices, and at a supplementary building, added onto the northeast side of the original trainshed.

The station also included the railway's workshops in the northeast corner of the site, and coal and lime depots on the south side.

After the acquisition of the Leeds and Selby by the York and North Midland Railway (Y&NMR) in 1840 passenger trains were diverted via the Y&NMR's line to its station in Hunslet Lane station. A local passenger service to Milford Junction was started in 1850.

=== Post Leeds extension line (1863–1900) ===
Around 1863 the site at Marsh Lane was redeveloped into a goods station. The old station was demolished and a six-storey grain warehouse was constructed on the site, designed by architect Thomas Prosser. In 1869 the North Eastern Railway's (NER) Leeds extension line from Marsh Lane to Leeds New railway station was completed, allowing through running along the Leeds and Selby Line into Leeds and beyond. A new passenger station was constructed at Marsh Lane on the route into central Leeds.

In 1894 an expansion of the facilities at the station was completed.

Preceding station	Historical railways	Following station
Leeds; Line and station open	North Eastern Railway	Osmondthorpe; Line open, station closed

=== British Railways (1900-1990s) ===
The station was closed in 1958. The Prosser grain warehouse was burnt down by a fire in the 1970s. As of 2013 the site was being offered for redevelopment by London and Continental Railways.

== Reopening and gentrification of area ==
Discussions about Leeds' rail network began in the 1990s with proposals to build a tram network. Marsh Lane and the nearby dual carriageway were considered as sites for stops to expand the city centre outwards St James's University Hospital. The Leeds Supertram proposal was rejected, meaning Leeds continued to operate with a single city centre rail station. As development began in nearby Quarry Hill, Leeds when the Department of Health located their new headquarters backing onto Marsh Lane. The nearby area over the next decade saw the construction of Leeds City College and other gentrification to the east of Leeds.

This development, along with the city's reliance on Leeds City train station, led many to publicly call for a second city centre railway station. Leeds City Council told local media in February 2020 that the reopening of Marsh Lane railway station should be seriously considered.

== See also ==
- Leeds Central railway station and Holbeck railway station, also closed in the 1950/60s
