= Leeds and Selby Railway =

Early British railway company (1834-1844)

- Predecessor: Leeds and Hull Railroad Company (1824) unbuilt
- Founded: 1830 (Act of Parliament); 1834 (Opening)
- Fate: Track owned by Network Rail, services by various operators
- Successor: Leased and acquired by York and North Midland Railway 1844 merged into North Eastern Railway 1854; London and North Eastern Railway 1923; British Rail 1948

The Leeds and Selby Railway was an early British railway company and first mainline railway within Yorkshire. It was opened in 1834.

As built, the line ran west/east between two termini, Marsh Lane station, Leeds and Selby railway station. The company was leased and then acquired by the York and North Midland Railway in 1840 and 1844; the line remained in use through the subsequent NER, LNER, BR and post-privatisation periods.

Use of the line was expanded through junction connections to new railways, most built in the late 19th century; a junction with the York and North Midland Railway in 1839; an end on junction at Selby to Hull (Hull and Selby Railway, 1840); a through route into Leeds and westward (Leeds viaduct extension, 1869); a shortened route to York (Micklefield to Church Fenton, 1869); a line to Wetherby (Cross Gates to Wetherby Line, 1876, closed 1964); a line to Castleford (Garforth to Castleford Line, 1878, closed 1969) and a line avoiding Selby for Goole (Selby to Goole Line, 1910, closed 1964) as well as a number of minor and industrial lines and sidings. The Selby Diversion of the East Coast Main Line (1983) also made junctions with the Leeds and Selby.

The line is still in mainline use for services operated by TransPennine Express and Northern. These trains operate from Leeds to Selby, Hull, York and beyond.

== The Leeds and Selby Railway Company (1830–1844) ==
=== Background ===
By 1830 Leeds had long been an important town, having become prosperous initially through the manufacture of woollen cloth. The Leeds and Liverpool Canal was complete and the Aire and Calder Navigation connected Leeds to the Ouse, and thus to the North Sea and beyond. Selby had grown in importance as a port since the construction of the Selby Canal and had become an important inland east coast port for coastal and foreign trade.

As early as 1814 (Note: One source ('The Tourist's companion..') gives a date of 16 January 1823 (Parsons 1835, p. 86), In 'Annals and History of Leeds' records a proposal as early as 1802.) the Leeds Mercury had printed letters promoting the idea of a railway from Leeds to Selby.

==== The Leeds and Hull Railway ====
The Leeds and Hull Railroad Company was formed in 1824 in Leeds. George Stephenson was appointed as engineer, and he directed Joseph Locke to survey the line.

Stephenson recommended a double track railway, operated by locomotives at a speed of 8 mph (13 km/h). The hills on the route out of Leeds were to have three inclined planes to be worked by three stationary engines. The remainder of the line was to be very nearly level.

The company was one of a number of contemporary projects aimed at linking the east and west sides of northern England, such as the Newcastle and Carlisle Railway (act of Parliament 1829) and the Liverpool and Manchester Railway (act of Parliament 1826). The Manchester and Leeds Railroad Company was formed in 1825, and would have completed the Lancashire to Yorkshire link. Representatives of the company were present at the opening of the Stockton and Darlington Railway in 1825. Of these schemes the Leeds and Hull, and the Manchester and Leeds were not immediately acted upon, in part due to the stock market crash of 1825. (Note: It may have also been that the shareholders were unwilling to commit to building the line until the success or failure of the Liverpool and Manchester Railway was known. (Allen 1974, p. 50), (Tomlinson 1915, p. 99)) The Leeds and Hull scheme stagnated, and in the meantime the Knottingley and Goole Canal (an extension of the Aire and Calder Navigation) opened in 1826 bringing the village of Goole from obscurity, and turning it into a viable transhipment port for Europe.

The growth of Goole as a port to rival Hull was sufficient to spur the Hull-based shareholders of the Leeds and Hull railway into action; at the end of 1828 they motioned that the railway should be built as far as Selby, with the remainder of the journey to Hull being made by steam packet, most importantly, bypassing Goole. The shareholders passed the proposal at a general meeting in Leeds on 20 March 1829, and the Leeds and Selby Railway Company was formed.

=== Formation of the Leeds and Selby Railway Company ===
The Leeds and Hull railway scheme of 1824 was revived as a shortened line from Leeds to Selby and was resurveyed by James Walker in 1829; Benjamin Gott, one of the line's promoters and a wool and cloth magnate thought the inclined planes would be a disadvantage.

James Walker reported that the stationary engines could be abandoned, and tunnels and cuttings built in their place. He expected that the additional cost of their construction would be offset by use of the stone elsewhere on the railway and by its sale. The railway would also be of use for the transportation of coal and stone from quarries and mines near the line, such as the Huddlestone quarry. Additionally he suggested that the route of the railway could also be used for the piping of clean water to Leeds. As to the route of the railway, he suggested resiting the Leeds terminus at cheaper and less-developed land around Marsh Lane instead of at Far Bank. The resurveyed line was also deviated to the north away from the river bank, to avoid the objections of the Aire and Calder Undertakers; the more northern path would require passing Richmond Hill requiring either stationary engines or a tunnel; Walker recommended the latter. Outside Leeds, minor deviations were made in order for the line to cross the north–south turnpikes using bridges. At Selby, the new plan sited the station further south than the original, which had been sited next to the road bridge, with the intention of crossing the River Ouse by widening this bridge; with the line no longer going to Hull but terminating at Selby a site with more space for wharves and jetties was required. He recommended a double track line, with sufficient land acquired for a four track line.

Much of the line was to be built on land belonging to the shareholders, including Edward Robert Petre who owned land in Selby, and Richard Oliver Gascoigne (who later had built the Aberford Railway). Walker's alterations to Stephenson's original plan were accepted unaltered and put before Parliament.

Leeds and Selby Railway Act 1830
- Act of Parliament
- Parliament of the United Kingdom
- Long title: An Act for making a Railway from the Town of Leeds to the River Ouse, within the Parish of Selby, in the West Riding of the County of York.
- Citation: 11 Geo. 4 & 1 Will. 4. c. lix

Dates
- Royal assent: 29 May 1830

Text of statute as originally enacted

Despite strong opposition from the Aire and Calder Navigation, which had a practical monopoly on transportation in the area, the Leeds and Selby Railway Act 1830 (11 Geo. 4 & 1 Will. 4. c. lix) was passed in Parliament on 29 May 1830 allowing construction of the line. The company was allowed to raise a total of £300,000 in shares and loans. (Note: An extract from the act on the rates of carriage, as well as a list of subscribers can be found reprinted in "The Tourist's Companion".(Parsons 1835, pp. 56–60)) The company's directors were James Audus, Edward Baines, Thomas Davison Bland, John Broadley, Richard Oliver Gascoigne, Benjamin Gott, Robert Harrison, John Marshall, John Cowham Parker, the Hon. Edward Robert Petre, John Scholefield and John Wilson. Samuel Wilks Waud was the first company chairman.

=== Construction, infrastructure and rolling stock ===
Leeds and Selby Railway Act 1835
- Act of Parliament
- Parliament of the United Kingdom
- Long title: An Act to enable the Leeds and Selby Railway Company to improve the Line of the said Railway; and for amending and enlarging the Powers and Provisions of an Act relating to such Railway.
- Citation: 5 & 6 Will. 4. c. lvii

Dates
- Royal assent: 3 July 1835

Two contractors, Messrs. Nowell & Sons and Messrs. Hamer & Pratt, were chosen to carry out the construction of the line. Nowell began construction of the 2 miles (3.2 km) out of Leeds on 1 October 1830, (Note: The work in Leeds was postponed until February 1831, since there was a possibility that a proposed Leeds & Bradford Railway might be built, giving the possibility of a through link taking a different path. (Tomlinson 1915, p. 205)) and Hamer & Pratt began work in February 1831 on the remaining 18 miles (29 km) to Selby.

The primary engineering feature of the line was the Richmond Hill Tunnel through Richmond Hill, Leeds. It was 700 yards (640 m) long, with its western entrance at 8 chains (160 m) from the Leeds terminus. The tunnel's cross section was that of a horseshoe arch, 22 ft (6.7 m) at its widest, and 17 ft (5.2 m) high from the level of the rails. The construction of the tunnel required the sinking of three shafts, subsequently retained for ventilation. Excavation of the tunnel yielded mostly shale and coal, with the remaining third being stone which was used as foundations for other parts of the line. The arch was lined with two courses of brickwork, lengthways to a thickness of 20 inches. In some places three courses were used, depending on the strength of the surrounding ground. Volcanic matter was used in the mortar, to obtain a quick-setting and strong cement. The entrances of the tunnel were faced with stone. This would be the world's longest railway tunnel at opening and the first through which passengers would be hauled by locomotives and there were once reflectors at the base of the shafts, designed to reflect light onto the whitewashed walls of the tunnel. The shafts were found to be useful for ventilation, but the experiment with illuminating the interior with reflect light was of limited utility to passengers; lamps were provided to light the carriages. Despite the efforts, an early passenger reported that on entering the tunnel:

We were immediately enveloped in total darkness, and every one of the carriages filled with smoke and steam to a most annoying degree

— The Mechanics' Magazine (1835),

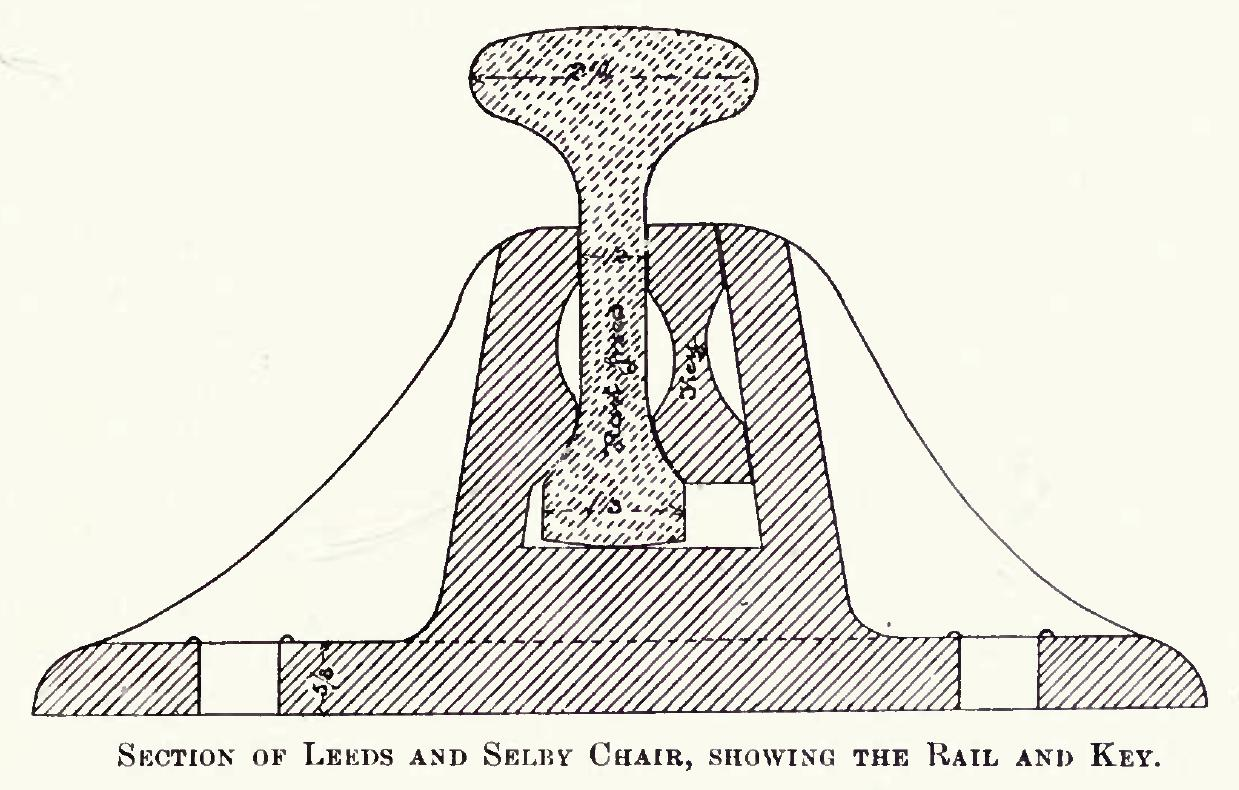
Cross section diagram of Leeds and Selby railway chair, key and rail

As built, the line had 43 bridges and around 16 level crossings. Ballast was of stone chips; the rails were held in place by keys lodged into iron chairs which rested on and were fixed to stone blocks or larch sleepers. On some parts of the line, a ladder track arrangement of sleepers was used, with longitudinal stone sleepers of 3 ft (0.91 m) held in gauge by transverse cast-iron rods. T or bar-shaped malleable iron rails of 35 lb/yd (17.4 kg/m) were initially used, within a few years 42 lb/yd (20.8 kg/m) rails were being introduced.

Cuttings and embankments were built to keep the gradient of the line to a minimum. The deepest cutting was 43 ft (13 m), the highest embankment 54 ft (16 m). Both embankments and cuttings had stone retaining walls at the base, at an angle of 67.5° to the horizontal, which reduced the overall width of the earthworks. The line was built as a double-track railway.

==== Route and stations ====
After 8 chains (160 m) of level track outside the Leeds terminus, the line generally ascended for a distance of 4 miles 32 chains (4.40 miles, 7.08 km) at a maximum slope of 1 in 160; it was then level for 2 miles 61 chains (2.76 miles, 4.45 km) after which it generally descended eastwards towards Selby for 6 miles 6 chains (6.08 miles, 9.78 km) with a maximum rate of descent of 1 in 137. The final 6 miles 41 chains (6.51 miles, 10.48 km) to Selby was practically level with a rate of descent of only 1 in 3,785. The highest point was 132 ft (40 m) above the Leeds terminus, with the whole line having a net descent of 100 ft (30.5 m) towards Selby.

The Marsh Lane terminus in Leeds, and the station at Selby, were early examples of what would become 'railway architecture': both were long rectangular sheds, with wooden trussed roofs, supported internally on cast iron columns. The stations served for both passenger and freight, with additional tracks external to the sheds for coal; there was no platform for passengers. Both stations had coal depots, the Leeds station contained the facilities for maintenance of engines and wagons. The rear of the Selby station backed onto the Ouse, across a road (Ousegate) from jetties that would allow a continuation of the journey to Hull.

After the station at Marsh Lane in Leeds were stations at Cross Gates, Garforth, Roman Road, Micklefield, Milford, and Hambleton.

==== Locomotives ====
The original engines were of the lightweight four-wheeled "Bury" type from Edward Bury of Liverpool. They were shown to lack traction sufficient for the line, and were sold. Replacements were obtained from Fenton, Murray and Jackson of (Leeds) and from Kirtley & Co. of Warrington.

Locomotive list

Name	Wheels	Builder	Date introduced	YNMR no.	NER no.	Comments
St Vincent	2-2-0	Edward Bury and Company	1834	–	–	To Newcastle & North Shields Railway, 1838
Lord Hood	2-2-0	Edward Bury and Company	1834	–	–	To West Hartlepool Harbour & Railway, 1840
Rodney	2-2-0	Edward Bury and Company	1834	–	–	To West Hartlepool Harbour & Railway, 1840
Nelson	2-2-0	Fenton, Murray & Jackson	1834	–	–	To York and North Midland Railway, 1849
Exmouth	2-2-0	Fenton, Murray & Jackson	1836	–	–	To West Hartlepool Harbour & Railway, 1840
?	0-2-2	Robert Stephenson and Company	1830	–	–	Ex-Liverpool & Manchester Railway North Star (acquired December 1833). Sold, January 1836
Gambier or Hawke	2-2-2	Fenton, Murray & Jackson	1836	14	–	
Eagle or Anson	2-2-2	Fenton, Murray & Jackson	1837	15	–	
Dart	2-2-2	Fenton, Murray & Jackson	1839	16	–	
?	2-2-0	Thomas Kirtley	1839	17	–	
Express	2-2-2	Fenton, Murray & Jackson	1839	18	–	Rebuilt as a tank engine by the YNMR
Prince	2-2-0	Thomas Kirtley	1839	19	–	
Swift	2-2-0	Thomas Kirtley	1839	20	–	
Swallow	2-2-0	Thomas Kirtley	1839	21	–	
Queen	2-2-0	Thomas Kirtley	1839	22	–	

Notes

1. YNMR = York and North Midland Railway
2. NER = North Eastern Railway
3. The names and numbers of the Kirtley locomotives may have been transposed

==== Rolling stock ====
There were first and second-class carriages, horse boxes and wagons, including privately owned wagons.

=== Opening and operation ===
By 22 September 1834, a single complete line of track had been built, and the railway was officially opened. A train of ten carriages, hauled by the locomotive "Nelson", set out from Marsh Lane station in Leeds at 6.30 am. To the embarrassment or amusement of those present, the locomotive got into difficulty on the incline at the tunnel. The wheels began to slip on wet rails, and despite the application of ash on the rails, initial progress was no better than walking pace. Once the high point of the line was reached, better progress was made: at Garforth, on a stretch of track falling 1 in 180 a speed of 20 mph (32 km/h) was attained. Selby was reached before 9 am. The return journey took 1 hour and sixteen minutes. On the 23rd, two trains were run each way, with a better timing of 1 hour and five minutes from Leeds to Selby.

Both lines of track were complete by 15 December, when the railway began to take goods traffic.

In The Railways of Britain and Ireland practically described and illustrated, Francis Whishaw ascribed the poor financial performance of the railway to the management of the line; after six years of existence, the railway was returning a profit, but the average dividend on a £100 share over 1837 to 1840 was a meagre one pound, sixteen shillings and nine pence.

As a result of the opening of the line, the Aire and Calder Navigation had to make considerable reductions in their charges. Previously, that company's monopoly had resulted in a dividend on shares of over 200%.

=== Connections with other railway lines ===
==== York and North Midland Railway ====
On 29 May 1839 the first section of George Hudson's York and North Midland Railway opened. It ran from York to a point just to the east of Milford station where a short chord connected it to the Leeds and Selby Railway. The line was extended southwards to Burton Salmon by 11 May 1840; and that line connected by another short chord to the junction with the Leeds and Selby on 9 November 1840.

East of the junction was a station called York Junction. (Note: After 1850 York Junction was called Old Junction, in 1867 in became Milford Old Junction, from 1897 it was called Gascoigne Wood. (Hoole 1986, pp. 32–33))

==== Hull and Selby Railway ====
The original Leeds to Hull plan was completed in 1840 with the construction of a line running almost directly east from Selby to Hull. A bascule bridge was constructed across the Ouse at Selby, just north of the jetties at the rear of the original Selby station. A new station to the west was constructed, and the old station became a goods shed.

==== Aberford Railway ====
The Aberford railway was a private railway built during the same period as the Leeds and Selby Railway by the Gascoigne family. It ran from Aberford and connected at Garforth. It was built primarily to carry coal from the Gascoignes' coal mines but also carried passengers. It closed in 1924.

== History, 1840–present ==
=== Lease and acquisition by the York and North Midland (1840–1854) ===
The Leeds and Selby Railway offered a direct route into Leeds from the east. George Hudson had his own route into Leeds (through Castleford via the Whitford and Methey Junctions) accessed via a working arrangement with the North Midland Railway. The Leeds and Selby had the potential to offer opportunities to rival companies, as well as a competing route to Hudson's. On 9 November 1840 George Hudson arranged a lease of the Leeds and Selby for £17,000 per annum.

Hudson's first act was to close the line to passengers west of Milford; despite his line being 4 miles (6.4 km) longer passengers now had no choice but to use it. In 1848 the line west of Milford was closed to freight as well; Marsh Lane station was at that time still a terminus, and so useless for through traffic to Manchester and beyond. Passenger services were reinstated in 1850, but freight continued to run to Leeds via Castleford and not Marsh Lane.

Leeds and Selby Railway Act 1844
- Act of Parliament
- Parliament of the United Kingdom
- Long title: An Act for vesting the Leeds and Selby Railway in the York and North Midland Railway Company, and for enabling that Company to raise a further Sum of Money to complete the Purchase of such Railway.
- Citation: 7 & 8 Vict. c. xxi

Dates
- Royal assent: 23 May 1844

The Leeds and Selby Railway Act 1844 (7 & 8 Vict. c. xxi) was passed allowing the York and North Midland to absorb the Leeds and Selby Railway entirely, and so the Leeds and Selby Railway as an independent entity ceased to exist. A decade later, the York and North Midland Railway would become the North Eastern Railway after its amalgamation with other railway companies.

=== NER period (1854–1923) ===
In the 1860s the North Eastern Railway (NER) sought to extend the line from its Marsh Lane terminus into the centre of Leeds. Concurrently the NER and the London and North Western Railway planned to construct a joint station in Leeds. An initial (1863) plan for the line into Leeds met with significant local opposition and was withdrawn, and a revised route was made. (See also Leather 1864) The plan was submitted to parliament in 1864 and received assent in 1865. (Note: "The North-eastern Railway (Leeds Extension) Act, 1865" (Cap. 251, 5 July 1865).) The new joint station received assent in the same session. (Note: "The Leeds New Railway Station Act, 1865" (Cap. 267, 5 July 1865).)

In 1869 the Leeds extension was completed; a 1-mile (1.6 km) length of line which connected Marsh Lane through central Leeds to Holbeck; the line was elevated, running over the streets on bridges and viaducts and embankments. A new station, called Leeds New railway station was constructed for this connecting line, adjacent to and south of Wellington Street station. The line representing a saving of around 35 miles (56.3 km) journey for trains travelling from west of Leeds to Hull or York. A new goods station was built at the Marsh Lane station site, and in 1893 this was enlarged, and the extra lines added between Marsh Lane and Neville Hill, the Richmond Hill tunnel was opened out at the same time, and made into a cutting, so that the extra tracks could be accommodated.

In 1869 a connecting line running northeast from Micklefield station on the Leeds and Selby to Church Fenton station on the former York and North Midland line was opened, shortening the route between Leeds and York and avoiding a reversal at York Junction; the line came into use on the opening of the Leeds extension.

In 1876 the Cross Gates–Wetherby line was opened; this ran from a junction just east of Cross Gates on the Leeds and Selby Line northward to Wetherby.

An act for the construction of the Garforth to Castleford Line was passed in 1873 and the line opened in 1878, it left the Leeds and Selby Line east of Garforth station. The NER owned over three quarters of the shares in the line.

In 1898 the Cawood, Wistow and Selby Light Railway was opened. This connected to the Leeds and Selby Line about 1 mile (1.6 km) west of Selby at Brayton Gates junction.

In 1902 Gascoigne Wood station (formerly York Junction station) closed.

In 1910 the Selby to Goole Line was opened, which had a junction with the Leeds and Selby Line at Thorpe Gates junction, west of Selby.

A halt station Ridge Bridge opened c. 1912 near to the crossing of the Roman Ridge road (now the A656.); the station closed to general passengers on 1 April 1914, but remained in use as a workmen's halt for the Ridge Bridge Colliery into the 1920s.

=== LNER period (1923–1948) ===
In 1930 a station at Osmondthorpe opened.

=== BR and post-privatisation period (1948–present) ===
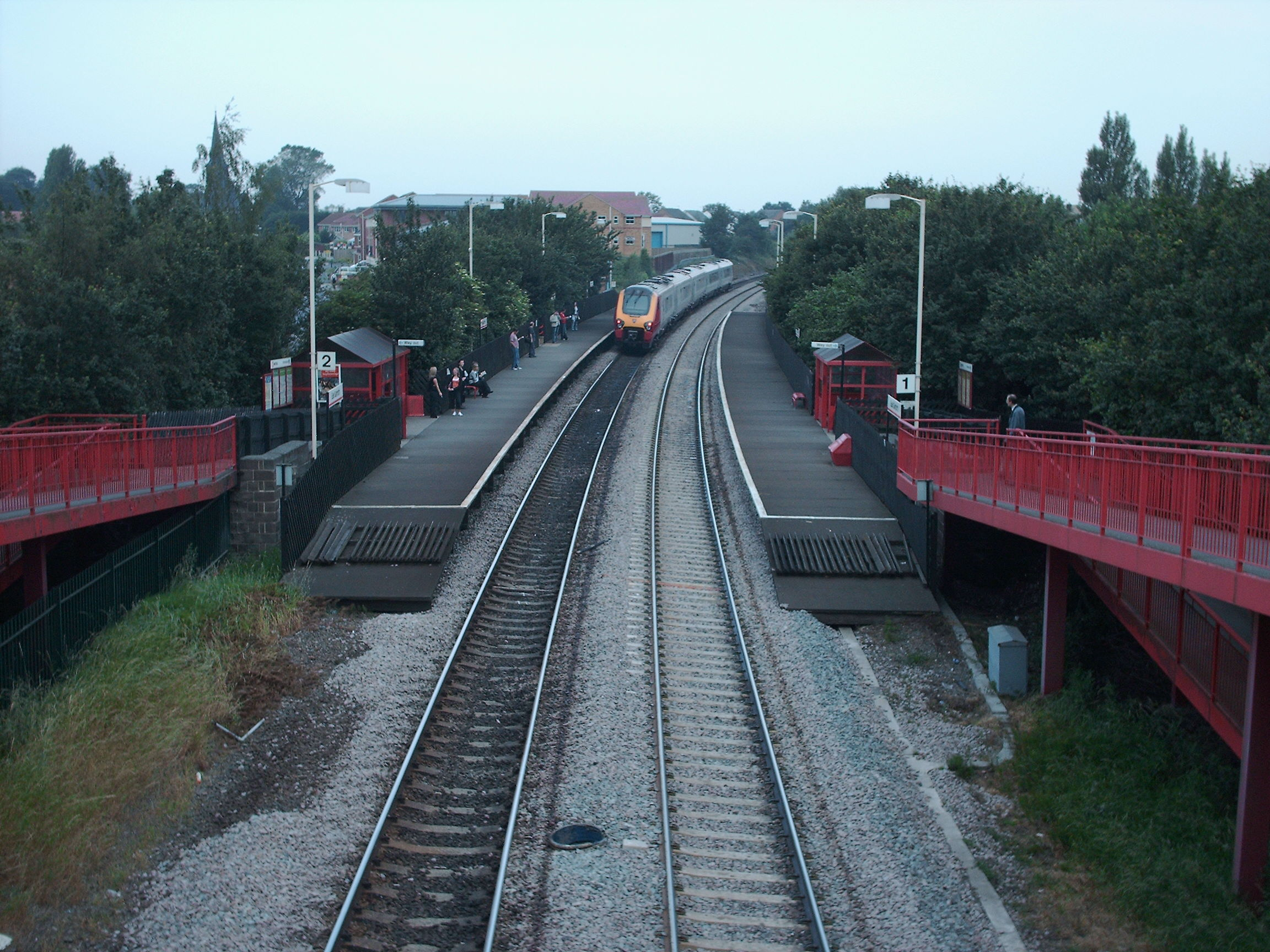
East Garforth station in 2006

Many of the connecting lines closed in the 1950s and 60s: passenger services on the Castleford–Garforth line from the junction at Garforth station closed in 1951, and freight ended in 1969, the Cawood, Wistow and Selby Light Railway in 1960, the Selby to Goole Line in 1964, and Cross Gates–Wetherby line from Cross Gates station also in 1964.

Hambleton station closed in 1959 and Osmondthorpe station in 1960. East Garforth railway station opened in 1987.

The land north of Gascoigne Wood station was used as a marshalling yard until 1959. The site was later used in the 1970s as the point at which coal from the collieries of the Selby Coalfield was brought to the surface. (Note: The last mine in the coalfield closed in 2004. The site is now a business park and in 2008 was used to store gypsum produced at coal burning power stations as part of the desulphurisation process.)

The Selby Diversion of the East Coast Main Line opened in 1983, passing under the Leeds-Selby Line between South Milford and Selby; junctions were made between the two lines allowing running from York onto the Leeds-Selby eastwards, and from the south onto the line travelling westwards to Leeds.

== Electrification ==
The line from Leeds Central station to Neville Hill depot was electrified in the early 1990s as a corollary to the East Coast Main Line electrification project. The electrification was energised in March 1993.

In 2005, as part of its franchise offer, the train operating Great North Eastern Railway (GNER) proposed to electrify the section of the line between Leeds and Hambleton junction in association with Network Rail, at an estimated cost of £70 million. GNER lost the franchise in December 2006 before undertaking the electrification work. (Note: The Department for Transport ended GNER's franchise due to financial problems, including the insolvency of its parent company Sea Containers; see GNER, and Sea Containers)

In 2009 the Network Rail route utilisation strategy electrification paper identified the North Cross-Pennine route including the Leeds-Selby-Hull Line as a high ranking option for future electrification, in terms of benefits to passenger services. In 2011 funding for the electrification in CP5 (see Network Rail Control Periods) of the section from Leeds to Micklefield was announced. (Note: The scheme also included the section of line from Mickefield to Church Fenton on the former York and North Midland track, and the line from Church Fenton to the ECML at Colton junction.) Funding for the section of the line from Micklefield to Selby was added to the electrification schedule in 2013.

== Popular culture ==
In the version of the traditional song "Paddy on the Railway" recorded by Ryan's Fancy in 1970, this railway is mentioned in the verse for 1843:

In eighteen hundred and forty three,
I broke my shovel across me knee;
I went to work for the company,
on the Leeds and Selby Railway.

== See also ==
- Neville Hill depot, rolling stock and locomotive depot on the line near Osmondthorpe, Leeds
