= York and Selby Lines =

Railway lines in Yorkshire, England

The York and Selby lines are railway lines in West and North Yorkshire. They provide a frequent service between Leeds, York, and Selby and intermediate stations. Metrocards of West Yorkshire Metro can be used between Leeds and Micklefield. Train operating companies are Northern for stopping trains, and CrossCountry, London North Eastern Railway and TransPennine Express for long-distance trains which continue beyond the termini of the local routes to and from Hull, Liverpool, Manchester, Newcastle upon Tyne and Scotland. The Leeds bound trains continue to Manchester, Liverpool, Reading, Plymouth, Penzance and Bristol.

== Line details ==
Although the lines are separate east of Micklefield station, they are listed together in timetables published by Northern who list the services as Route 35.

The lines follow the Leeds and Selby Railway between Leeds and a junction immediately east of Micklefield station. Stations on this section are:

- Leeds
- Cross Gates
- Garforth, the former junction with the Cross Gates–Wetherby line, closed in 1964
- East Garforth, opened in 1987
- Roman Road, closed already in 1834
- Micklefield

(closed stations shown in slanted type). An East Leeds Parkway railway station near Micklefield has been proposed to relieve Leeds station, but plans have been put on hold, and an alternative site at Thorpe Park is also considered.

After the junction, the line to Selby continues on the route of the Leeds and Selby Railway with the following stations:

- South Milford
- Hambleton, closed in 1959
- Selby

(closed stations shown in slanted type). Trains continuing from and to Hull follow the route of the Hull and Selby Railway.

The line to York follows the Cross Country Route northeast of Micklefield. There are no intermediate stations until it joins the Dearne Valley line south of Church Fenton. South of York, it joins the East Coast Main Line. Stations on the York branch of the line are:

- Church Fenton, the former junction with the Harrogate–Church Fenton line which closed in 1964
- Ulleskelf
- Bolton Percy, closed in 1965
- Copmanthorpe, closed in 1959
- York railway station.

(closed stations shown in slanted type).
