= Listed buildings in Brampton, North East Derbyshire =

Brampton is a civil parish in the North East Derbyshire district of Derbyshire, England. The parish contains 37 listed buildings that are recorded in the National Heritage List for England. Of these, one is listed at Grade I, the highest of the three grades, three are at Grade II*, the middle grade, and the others are at Grade II, the lowest grade. The parish contains the villages of Cutthorpe, Old Brampton, and Wadshelf, and the surrounding countryside. Most of the listed buildings are houses and associated structures, farmhouses and farm buildings. The other listed buildings include a church, a chapel, and two guide posts.

== Key ==
| Grade | Criteria |
|---|---|
| I | Buildings of exceptional interest, sometimes considered to be internationally important |
| II* | Particularly important buildings of more than special interest |
| II | Buildings of national importance and special interest |

== Buildings ==
| Name and location | Photograph | Date | Notes | Grade |
|---|---|---|---|---|
| St Peter and St Paul's Church; 53.24330°N 1.49778°W | | c. 1100 or before | The church has been altered and extended through the centuries, and was restored in 1868 by Samuel Rollinson. It is built in sandstone, the body of the church has a lead roof and embattled parapets, and the porch has a roof of sandstone slabs. The church consists of a nave with a clerestory, north and south aisles, a south porch, a chancel with a north vestry, and a west steeple. The steeple has a tower with three stages, angle buttresses, a clock face on the south, two-light bell openings, and a broach spire with lucarnes. The porch has a double-chamfered arch with moulded capitals, and an ogee-shaped crocketed hood mould. Inside the porch are benches, and the doorway is late Norman with a slightly pointed arch. | I |
| Brampton Manor, walls gate piers and railings 53.24269°N 1.49832°W | — | Late 16th century | The house, which has been extended and altered, is in sandstone and has stone slate roofs with coped gables. The main block faces east, and has two storeys and attics and a double-depth plan, and at right angles to the west is a lower two-storey wing. On the front facing the road are two gabled bays and the wing. Between the gabled bays is a porch with Tuscan columns, an architrave, a frieze, and a cornice. The left bay contains sash windows with moulded lintels, and in the right bay the windows are mullioned and transomed. The wing contains a three-light mullioned window, and a doorway with a quoined surround, and inside the wing are two cruck trusses. The west boundary wall includes an embattled part containing a semicircular-headed gateway. The front garden wall has chamfered copings and railings, square gate piers with rounded pyramidal caps, and decorative railings and gates in cast iron. | II |
| Outbuilding south of Hall Farmhouse; 53.25283°N 1.48369°W | — | Late 16th century | The building is timber framed, encased in sandstone and red brick, with a roof of stone slate and some Welsh slate. There are two storeys and four bays. It contains two doorways, one with a quoined surround, the other with a fanlight, three taking-in doors in the upper storey, and vents of various types. | II |
| Outbuilding, Hallcliff Farm; 53.23053°N 1.52627°W | — | Late 16th century | The outbuilding has a cruck frame, with walls in sandstone, massive quoins, and a roof of corrugated sheet. It is mainly in a single storey, and has four bays, and a flat-roofed extension to the southwest. The building contains three doorways and three windows. Inside, two cruck trusses remain. | II |
| Cutthorpe Hall; 53.25338°N 1.48477°W | — | Late 16th or early 17th century | A manor house that has been altered and extended, it is in sandstone with gritstone dressings, quoins, and stone slate roofs with coped gables and moulded kneelers. There is a complex plan around a linear core, partly in two storeys, and partly in two storeys with attics. The east front has five bays, and contains a doorway with a quoined and moulded surround, a four-centred arched head and a hood mould. Most of the windows are mullioned, some have been altered, and there is an oeil-de-boeuf window. | II* |
| Barn, Frith Hall Farm; 53.23476°N 1.50523°W | | 1602 (probable) | The barn, which has been altered and extended, has a cruck framed core, and is in sandstone with a stone slate roof. There is a single storey, six bays, an extension at the southeast, and a two-bay outshut. It contains segmental-arched doorways, two tiers of vents, and four taking-in doors. Inside there are seven pairs of massive cruck trusses. | II* |
| Cutthorpe Old Hall; 53.25635°N 1.48822°W | | c. 1625 | A manor house in sandstone on a moulded plinth, with quoins, string courses stepped over the openings as hood moulds, and a stone slate roof with moulded gable copings and kneelers. There are three storeys and attics, two bays, a stair tower, a two-storey rear range, and a single-storey extension. There are gables on three sides, and the stair tower is also gabled. In an angle is a doorway with a moulded surround and a massive chamfered lintel, and most of the windows are mullioned. | II* |
| Farm outbuildings, Cutthorpe Hall; 53.25370°N 1.48461°W | — | Early 17th century | The buildings are in sandstone with quoins and roofs of stone slate, Welsh slate and tile. They consist of two parallel ranges flanking a courtyard, with one storey and lofts, at the north end is an entrance shed, and the southern end is closed by a wall. The buildings contain doorways and mullioned windows. | II |
| Old Hall Cottage; 53.25636°N 1.48841°W | | Early 17th century | The cottage, originally a wing of Cutthorpe Old Hall, is in sandstone, with quoins, and a stone slate roof, coped on the left. There are two storeys and five bays, the right bay gabled. In the centre is a doorway with a plain lintel, and most of the windows are mullioned with hood moulds. | II |
| Pratt Hall and outbuildings 53.25440°N 1.51070°W | | Early 17th century | The house, which has been remodelled and altered, is in sandstone, with gritstone dressings to the earlier part, quoins, and a roof of stone slate and tile with coped gables and moulded kneelers. The house has two storeys and an L-shaped plan, with a main range of three bays, and a single-bay rear range. The doorway has a quoined surround and a massive lintel, most of the windows are mullioned, and in the gable are two blocked oeil-de-boeuf windows. The outbuilding to the left has two parts, one with a single storey and the other with a loft. | II |
| The Birches; 53.23749°N 1.51058°W | — | Early 17th century | The house, which was later altered and extended, is in sandstone, with gritstone dressings, quoins, a string course, and a stone slate roof with coped gables and moulded kneelers. There are two storeys and five bays, two of the bays gabled, and a single-storey extension. The doorway on the front has a moulded surround and a pointed head. Some windows have pointed heads, and others are mullioned with hood moulds. At the north end is a doorway with a quoined chamfered surround. | II |
| Cruck barn, The Bungalow; 53.23488°N 1.52826°W | — | Early 17th century | The barn is in sandstone with a tile roof, two storeys and five bays. The doors and windows have substantial lintels. Inside, there are four cruck trusses, three of them complete. | II |
| The Old Barracks; 53.25352°N 1.48420°W | — | Early 17th century | A farm outbuilding in sandstone, with quoins, and a stone slate roof with a coped gable, moulded kneelers, and a finial platform on the north end. There are three storeys and four bays. On the east front are two doorways, the left with a quoined surround with a massive lintel, and the other an insertion, a three-light mullioned window, a single-light window, and a rectangular opening. On the west front is a flight of stone steps, and in the south gable end, overlooking the house, are mullioned windows with hood moulds. | II |
| Wigley Farmhouse; 53.24309°N 1.52835°W | — | Early 17th century | The farmhouse is in sandstone, the gable ends rendered, with quoins, and a tile roof with coped gables and moulded kneelers. There are two storeys and a T-shaped plan, consisting of a front range of five bays, and a central gabled range at the rear. The doorway has a shallow bracketed canopy, and the windows are mullioned. | II |
| Outbuildings west of Hollins House; 53.24249°N 1.51755°W | — | 17th century | The outbuildings are in sandstone, with quoins, and roofs of stone slate and tile. There are two ranges forming an L-shaped plan. The east range has a single storey, a loft at the south end, and three bays. It contains a doorway with a quoined surround, and a massive lintel with a segmental-arched soffit, two doorways with plain surrounds, a taking-in door, and windows with moulded surrounds. The west range has five bays, and an added bay containing an arched opening and a staircase to an upper floor doorway. | II |
| Cottage and outbuildings northwest of Pratt Hall; 53.25451°N 1.51139°W | — | 17th century | The building is in sandstone with roofs of stone slate and tile. There is an L-shaped plan, with the cottage forming a cross-wing on the left. The cottage has a two-storey gabled bay, and a lower single-storey bay to the right. In the outbuilding range are two windows and a doorway, and inside are two cruck trusses. | II |
| The Dower House; 53.25295°N 1.48443°W | — | Mid 17th century | The house is in sandstone, partly on a chamfered plinth, with quoins, and a stone slate roof with coped gables and moulded kneelers. There are two storeys and attics, a south front of five bays with two gables, and two gabled rear ranges. The doorway has a quoined and moulded surround, a massive lintel and a hood mould. Some windows are mullioned, some are sashes, some have single lights, and there are two gabled dormers. | II |
| Wigley Hall; 53.24388°N 1.52743°W | — | 17th century | The house is in sandstone with gritstone dressings, quoins, a lintel band, and a tile roof with coped gables and moulded kneelers. There are two storeys, a symmetrical front of five bays, a central pediment containing an oculus, and lean-tos at the west and the rear. The central doorway has a small hood, and a deep lintel incorporating a rectangular plaque. | II |
| Birley Grange Farmhouse; 53.25491°N 1.52970°W | — | 1689 | The farmhouse is in sandstone, with quoins, a floor band, and a stone slate roof with coped gables and moulded kneelers. There are two storeys, four bays, a rear outshut, and a lean-to on the right. The doorway has a quoined surround, a massive lintel with carved motifs, and an initialled and dated keystone with a ball finial motif. The windows are three-light casements with the mullions removed. | II |
| Pratthall Farmhouse; 53.25442°N 1.51047°W | — | 1700 | The farmhouse is in sandstone, with quoins, and a tile roof. There are two storeys and a T-shaped plan, with a main range of two storeys and three bays, a recessed bay to the southeast, and a later single-storey extension at right angles. The doorway has a quoined surround and a massive initialled and dated lintel. Most of the windows are mullioned with casements, and there is a stair window and a 20th-century window. | II |
| Outbuilding northwest of Pratt Hall; 53.25463°N 1.51121°W | — | Early 18th century | The outbuilding is in sandstone, with quoins, and a corrugated sheet roof with coped gables and moulded kneelers. There are two storeys and a single bay, with a doorway in the middle of each storey. The doorway in the upper storey has a quoined surround and a massive lintel, and is approached by a two-flight stairway with a dog kennel on the landing. Above the doorway is a hood forming a ledge for a two-light mullioned window, possibly formerly a dove hole. In the other gable end is a blocked taking-in door. | II |
| Guide Post at SK 303 720; 53.24535°N 1.54894°W | | 1743 | The guide post at a road junction is in sandstone. It consists of a rectangular dated post with inscriptions on four sides indicating the roads to Middleton, Dronfield, Chesterfield, and Bakewell. | II |
| Garden walls and gate piers, Cutthorpe Hall; 53.25315°N 1.48486°W | — | 18th century | The boundary wall of the garden is in sandstone. It contains a semicircular recess where the walls rise to a height of 2 metres (6 ft 7 in), with quoins, and ramped and flat copings. In the recess is a gateway approached by five semicircular steps, flanked by square gate piers, each with an oversailing moulded cap. | II |
| Guide Post at SK 307 718; 53.24288°N 1.53991°W | — | 18th century (probable) | The guide post at a road junction is in sandstone. It consists of a tall rectangular post with inscriptions on two faces indicating the roads to Chesterfield and Sheffield. | II |
| Cottage northeast of Rufford Farmhouse; 53.23160°N 1.51444°W | — | Mid 18th century | The cottage is in sandstone with a stone slate roof. There are two storeys, three bays, and a single-storey extension. The central doorway has a massive surround and a deep lintel, and most of the windows are mullioned with casements. | II |
| Temperance House; 53.23388°N 1.52943°W | — | 18th century | The house is in sandstone, rendered on the front, and has a Welsh slate roof, and two storeys. There are two ranges, a taller range with two bays to the west, and a lower L-shaped range on the east. The south front has three bays, the right bay gabled, and a trellised porch with decorative bargeboards. In the east range is a doorway with a massive surround, a deep lintel and a bracketed hood. Most of the windows in both ranges are mullioned. | II |
| Ashgate House; 53.24017°N 1.47998°W | | Mid to late 18th century | The house, later altered, extended and used for other purposes, is in stone and brick, with stone dressings, quoins, a projecting eaves cornice, and a roof of Welsh slate and stone slate with coped gables and moulded kneelers. There are three storeys, two bays, and a single-storey range to the right. In the main block, the windows in the ground floor are coupled sashes with moulded surrounds, in the middle floor are Venetian windows, and the top floor contains Diocletian windows. In the right range are sash windows, and at its end are twin gables, each with a segmental headed window, and a central flat-roofed porch with semicircular-headed windows. | II |
| Birley Grange Cottage Farm; 53.25434°N 1.52964°W | | Late 18th century | The house is in sandstone with a stone slate roof. There are two storeys, three bays, the right bay projecting, and a single-storey extension further to the right. The doorway has a stone surround, in the left two bays are two-light mullioned windows with casements. The windows in the right bay have been altered, and external steps lead up to an upper floor doorway. | II |
| Outbuilding northwest of Hollins House; 53.24266°N 1.51753°W | — | Late 18th century | The outbuilding is in sandstone with a roof of stone slate and tile. There is an L-shaped plan with two ranges at right angles. The taller range has two storeys, and contains three doorways, and horizontally-sliding sash windows. The lower range has one storey, and contains a doorway with a quoined surround and a massive lintel. On the east gable is an external staircase leading to a doorway with a quoined surround. | II |
| Frith Hall Farmhouse; 53.23478°N 1.50466°W | | 1804 | The farmhouse is in sandstone with a stone slate roof. There are two storeys and a T-shaped plan, consisting of a symmetrical southeast front with three bays, and a single-bay rear wing. Above the central doorway is a dated and initialled plaque, and the windows in the front are casements. The rear wing contains two-light mullioned windows, and above the doorway is a datestone. | II |
| Outbuilding, Frith Hall Farm; 53.23476°N 1.50480°W | — | Early 19th century | The outbuilding, which has previously been used for various purposes, is in sandstone with a stone slate roof. In the south wall are two doorways, one with a quoined surround, the other is wider with a plain surround, and between them is a casement window with a quoined surround. | II |
| Hollins House, wall and gate piers 53.24259°N 1.51699°W | — | Early 19th century | The house is in sandstone with a stone slate roof, two storeys and three bays. The central doorway has a rectangular fanlight and a bracketed canopy, and the windows are sashes. The garden wall has flat coping, and in the central section is a doorway with a quoined surround. The gate piers are square and have shallow pyramidal caps. | II |
| Methodist Chapel, Wadshelf; 53.23452°N 1.52797°W | | 1834 | The chapel is in sandstone and has a Welsh slate roof with obelisk finials. On the front is a gabled porch with a semicircular-headed window and an entrance on the right return. To its left is a sash window, to the right is a single-bay projection containing a sash window, and there are similar windows in the left return. Above the porch is an inscribed and dated plaque. | II |
| Rufford Farmhouse and wall 53.23134°N 1.51501°W | | Mid 19th century | The farmhouse is in gritstone with quoins, and a slate roof with coped gables, moulded kneelers, and ball finials at the east end. There are two storeys, a double depth plan, and a symmetrical front of three bays. The central doorway has massive jambs, a fanlight, a deep lintel, and a moulded and bracketed canopy, and the windows are casements. The boundary is enclosed by a stone wall with flat and chamfered copings, and in parts with railings. | II |
| Farm outbuilding west of Rufford Farmhouse; 53.23141°N 1.51547°W | — | Mid 19th century | The building is in gritstone and has a slate roof with coped gables. There is one storey and three bays. It contains a central double opening and a doorway, both with a quoined surround, and windows with segmental heads and cast iron frames. | II |
| Outbuildings north of Rufford Farmhouse; 53.23166°N 1.51531°W | — | Mid 19th century | The range of outbuildings is in sandstone with roofs of stone slate and tile. There are two storeys, projecting wings in the centre and at the west end with hipped gables and single-storey extensions, and at the west end is a single-storey building with a semicircular brick opening. The other parts contain doorways, windows and vents, and a flight of steps leads to an upper floor doorway. | II |
| Outbuildings north of The Birches; 53.23763°N 1.51063°W | — | Mid 19th century | The outbuildings are in sandstone, with a roof of stone slate and corrugated sheeting, and six bays. They are in two parts, the south part taller with three bays, containing doorways, taking-in doors, and vents. The north part has three bays, and contains a doorway with a quoined surround and a fanlight, and single-light openings. There is an external flight of steps leading to an upper floor doorway, and a further doorway in the upper floor. | II |
