= Ashgate, Derbyshire =

Coordinates: 53.23°N 01.46°W

Ashgate
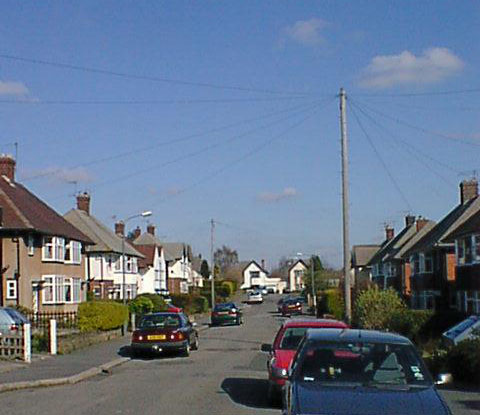
- Orchard View Road, Ashgate.

- Location within Derbyshire
- OS grid reference: SK3671
- Shire county: Derbyshire
- Region: East Midlands
- Country: England
- Sovereign state: United Kingdom
- Police: Derbyshire
- Fire: Derbyshire
- Ambulance: East Midlands

Ashgate is an area in northeast Derbyshire, England, west of the town of Chesterfield.

The Woodside public house enjoys a prime location at the top of Ashgate hill. There is a wood that runs on from this roundabout, leading to Ashgate Hospice. Following along the route is the village of Old Brampton. The Ashgate area is adjacent to the districts of Brampton, Old Brampton and the town centre itself.
