= Brampton, Derbyshire =

Coordinates: 53.231°N 1.463°W

Brampton
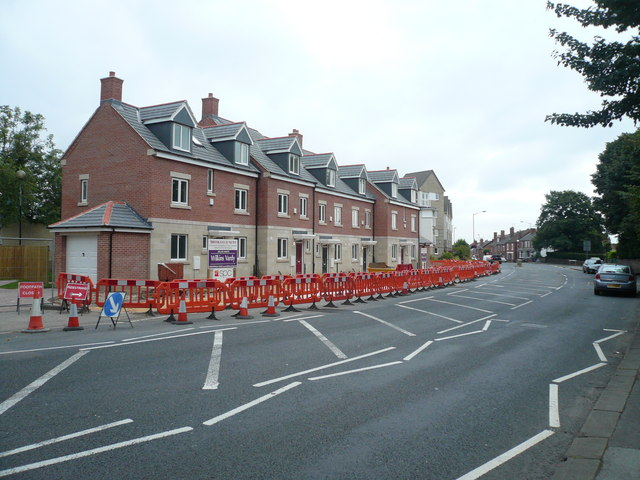
- Chatsworth Road Townhouse Development, Brampton.

- Location within Derbyshire
- OS grid reference: SK359705
- District: Chesterfield
- Shire county: Derbyshire
- Region: East Midlands
- Country: England
- Sovereign state: United Kingdom
- Post town: CHESTERFIELD
- Postcode district: S40
- Dialling code: 01246
- Police: Derbyshire
- Fire: Derbyshire
- Ambulance: East Midlands

Brampton is a suburb in the west of Chesterfield, Derbyshire. Originally a village known as New Brampton and separate from the town, it became absorbed into it over time due to urban sprawl. It is centred on Chatsworth Road, the main arterial road (A619) that connects the town with the Peak District and Manchester.

== History ==
The suburb has a historical association with the civil parish of Brampton in North East Derbyshire district, which is still outside the town. The civil parish includes the villages of Old Brampton (from which the suburb derives its name), Wadshelf and Cutthorpe which is a small village about 4 miles (6.4 km) north-west of Chesterfield with a village school, a butcher's shop and a small post office/grocery store, three public houses and two historic halls; the main road straggles through the village for three miles, reaching the Grange at its highest point, with commanding views all around.

The suburb of Brampton until the late 19th century was a part of the ancient Brampton parish which was a large area centred on the village of Brampton and St Peter and St Paul's Church. Very little was recorded at the location of what would become the built-up area until the Industrial Revolution caused Chesterfield to expand. The Brampton parish boundary lay by the River Hipper to within a mile of Chesterfield centre, and around which began to develop many varied industries, concerns included iron foundries, potteries, tobacco manufacturing, woollen cloth production, bobbin making, brewing pillbox making and lint manufacture, these works and surrounding residential areas becoming conterminous with the town and necessitating a new parish church, St Thomas's built in 1832. By the late 19th century the suburb had become known as New Brampton while the original village was termed Old Brampton, which remained small and rural. New Brampton later on in everyday local parlance was abbreviated to just Brampton, and then formally removed from Brampton parish and absorbed into Chesterfield in 1892.

== Entertainment ==
The Chatsworth Road area was known for the 'Brampton Mile.' This was a stretch of pubs, approximately a mile long, where a night out would include one drink in each bar. There are now fewer pubs in the area and many of the buildings have been demolished to make way for new businesses and housing development.

In recent years, the area has become known for its plethora of independent shops along Chatsworth Road. A number of new retail developments, such as 131 Chatsworth Road and the Hanger, have sprung up alongside well-established, traditional family businesses.

A festival celebrating the local community and small businesses on and around Chatsworth Road is held in October. A monthly publication, called S40 Local, seeks to promote the vibrancy of the local area and its many amenities.

The Brampton area is also served by glossy monthly publication Twist.

== Housing ==
The area boasts several housing estates, some of which date from many decades ago. However, new housing is being built all the time and this area is rapidly expanding.

Plans for regeneration of the former Walton Works site, which includes retail and housing development, is due to be considered by Chesterfield Borough Council in early 2013.

== Politics ==
Brampton is divided into two electoral wards on Chesterfield Borough Council called Holmebrook and West.

The area comes under Hipper Division on Derbyshire County Council.

== Industry ==
Robinson and Sons established its box manufacturing business at Wheatfield House in Brampton in the 1840s. By the 1950s, the company's packaging and dressings factories covered a large area by the River Hipper in Brampton, with a workforce of thousands of employees. The Robinson Packaging headquarters is still at Field House in Brampton, but most of the manufacturing has closed in Chesterfield since the 1980s.

== Notable people ==
- John Fawkes (born 1933), first-class cricketer

== See also ==
- List of places in Derbyshire
- St Peter and St Paul's Church, Old Brampton
- St Thomas' Church, Brampton
