= Ingmanthorpe =

Ingmanthorpe may refer to:

- Ingmanthorpe, Derbyshire, England
- Ingmanthorpe, North Yorkshire, England
