= Ashgate =

Ashgate may refer to:

- Ashgate Publishing, a British publishing company
- Ashgate, Derbyshire, an area in Derbyshire, England
