= Ulleskelf =

Village and civil parish in North Yorkshire, England

Coordinates: 53.85488°N 1.21267°W

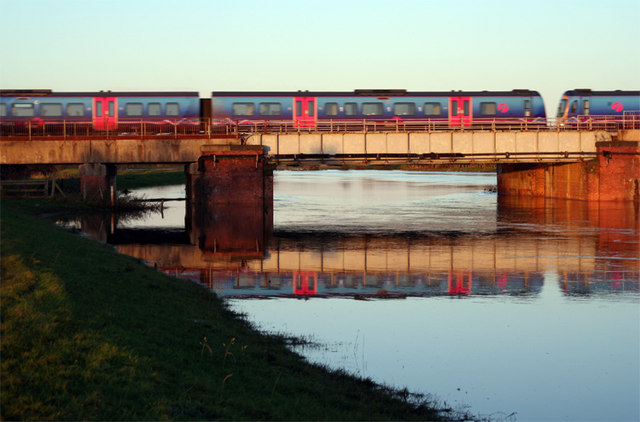
- Railway Bridge over River Wharfe at Ulleskelf

- Location within North Yorkshire
- Population: 980 (2011 census)
- OS grid reference: SE518401
- Civil parish: Ulleskelf
- Unitary authority: North Yorkshire
- Ceremonial county: North Yorkshire
- Region: Yorkshire and the Humber
- Country: England
- Sovereign state: United Kingdom
- Post town: TADCASTER
- Postcode district: LS24
- Police: North Yorkshire
- Fire: North Yorkshire
- Ambulance: Yorkshire

Ulleskelf /ˈʌləˌskɛlf/ is a village and civil parish in the county of North Yorkshire, England, four miles from Tadcaster on the River Wharfe.

Its name comes from the Scandinavian personal name Úlfr, while skelf may be an Old English word meaning "a flat area" (a cognate of shelf), although it could be from the Old Scandinavian equivalent, 'skialf' as in several other English place names, e.g. Hunshelf, Wadshelf. In this geographical context 'skelf' would mean 'bank' (of the river). The settlement was recorded in the Domesday Book as Oleschel and Oleslec.

The village was historically part of the West Riding of Yorkshire until 1974. From 1974 to 2023 it was part of the Selby District, it is now administered by the unitary North Yorkshire Council.

It is served by Ulleskelf railway station, operated by Northern. It has one public house (the Ulleskelf Arms) and one shop (Post Office/general store). The 2011 UK Census recorded the population of the parish as 980. Ulleskelf village hall was previously the Church of England) church of St Saviour. The Methodist church was in use until it closed in 2024. "Mind Games", an episode of TV detective series A Touch of Frost, was filmed in the village in 2008.

== Governance ==
Ulleskelf is the most populous village in the electoral ward called Saxton and Ulleskelf. The ward's population at the 2011 census was 2,341.

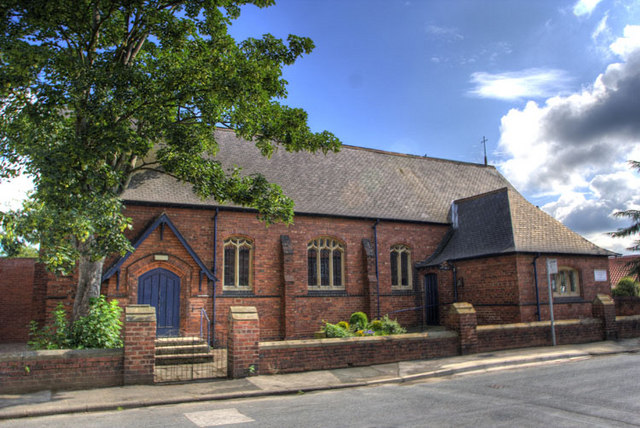
The village hall

== See also ==
- Listed buildings in Ulleskelf
