= Listed buildings in Ulleskelf =

Ulleskelf is a civil parish in the county of North Yorkshire, England. It contains four listed buildings that are recorded in the National Heritage List for England. All the listed buildings are designated at Grade II, the lowest of the three grades, which is applied to "buildings of national importance and special interest". The parish contains the village of Ulleskelf and the surrounding area. All the listed buildings are in the village, and all are houses.

== Buildings ==
Name and location	Photograph	Date	Notes
Church View; 53.85470°N 1.20982°W	—	17th century	The house, which has been altered and extended, is in reddish-brown brick on a rendered plinth, with magnesian limestone at the rear, dentilled eaves and a pantile roof. There are two storeys and three bays. In the centre is a doorway, on the right bay of the upper floor is a casement window, and the other windows are horizontally sliding sashes with cambered heads.
Manor Farm Cottages; 53.85376°N 1.20706°W	—	Early to mid-18th century	A house divided into two, in pinkish-brown brick, with dressings in stone and brick, red brick quoins, a cogged eaves band, and a tile roof with two rows of stone slates, hipped on the right and with brick and stone coping on the left gable. There are two storeys and three bays. In the centre is a gabled porch and a doorway with a fanlight. The windows are sashes with quoined jambs, flat arches of rubbed brick, and stone keystones and sills.
Rosedene; 53.85439°N 1.20943°W		Early to mid-18th century	A house that was later extended, it is in pinkish-brown brick on a rendered plinth, with a floor band, a stepped and cogged eaves band, and a pantile roof. There are two storeys and three bays, and a later higher bay on the right. On the front of the earlier part is a doorway, a fire window to the left, and horizontally sliding sash windows. All the ground floor openings are under relieving arches. On the later bay are a blocked doorway and sash windows, all with cambered arches.
House adjoining Church View; 53.85467°N 1.20969°W	—	Mid to late 18th century (probable)	The house is in pinkish-brown brick on a rendered plinth, with courses of magnesian limestone at the rear, and a swept pantile roof with brick coped gables. There are two storeys and two bays. In the centre is a doorway, and the windows are horizontally sliding sashes. The ground floor openings have segmental-arched heads, and those on the upper floor have cambered heads.
