= Copmanthorpe railway station =

Disused railway station in North Yorkshire, England

Copmanthorpe
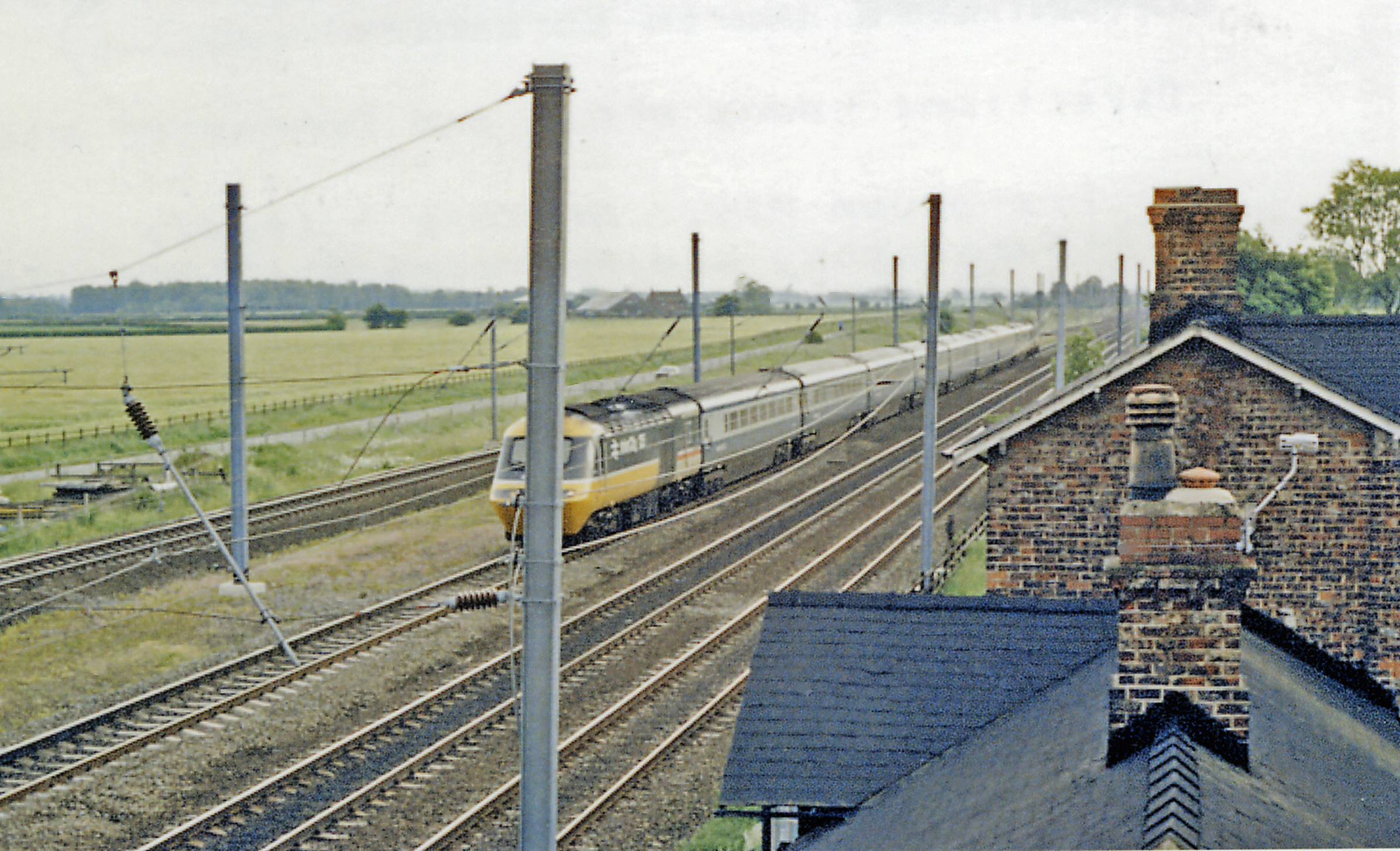
- Site of the station in 1988

General information
- Location: Copmanthorpe, North Yorkshire; England
- Coordinates: 53.9117°N 1.1385°W
- Grid reference: SE566465
- Platforms: 2

Other information
- Status: Disused

History
- Original company: York and North Midland Railway
- Pre-grouping: North Eastern Railway
- Post-grouping: LNER

Key dates
- 29 May 1839: Opened
- 1904: Relocated
- 5 January 1959: Closed to passengers
- 4 May 1964: Goods yard closed
Location

Copmanthorpe railway station served the village of Copmanthorpe, North Yorkshire, England from 1839 to 1959 on the York to Normanton line. The line also became part of the East Coast Main Line at various periods. The station was moved and substantially rebuilt halfway through its working life.

== History ==
Copmanthorpe railway station was situated on the edge of and to the south east of the village of Copmanthorpe. In 1839, George Hudson’s York and North Midland Railway started to construct its first railway line, which ran south from York; Copmanthorpe was the first stop out of York on that line and 3 miles 57 chains from York. The line through Copmanthorpe was built level between York and Bolton Percy and opened on 23 May 1839 with the station opening 6 days later on 29 May.

=== First Station ===
The York to Normanton line had two tracks (one in each direction) when built, and the 1892 OS Map shows that Copmanthorpe station had two platforms, one on each side of the line. Trains to York departed from the platform on the Copmanthorpe (west) side of the line. A road (now known as Station Road and Temple Lane) between Copmanthorpe and Acaster Malbis crossed the line on a level crossing; the station was built north of that crossing. At the time the railway was built, the closest house to the station in Copmanthorpe was on Main Street, in the region of Wilstrop Farm Road and there were no houses on Temple Lane.

The York and North Midland Railway provided a station building on the south end of the platform on the Copmanthorpe side of the line, on the platform that served York. It was designed by G.T. Andrews (as the first permanent station on the first York and North Midland line, it was probably the first G.T. Andrews railway design to be built) and included his favoured bay window that afforded the Station Master a good view of the platforms and the line. The 1892 map also shows a building on the south bound platform, close to the end by the level crossing; probably containing a waiting room. The platforms were about 380 feet (116 m) long, which would be able to accommodate a 4 coach modern DMU.

A small goods yard with one short siding was situated to the south of the level crossing, but on the Copmanthorpe side of the line. A weighbridge and its office was located at the road entrance to the yard. Another small siding was located on the other side of the line, again, south of the level crossing. Both sidings were connected to their respective lines by trailing crossovers. A signal box that controlled the level crossing was located on the opposite side of the road to the station building, in the corner of the goods yard.

A second level crossing was located 33 chains (0.42 miles (676 m)) further along from the Copmanthorpe station level crossing, where Moor Lane (then called Moor Road) crossed the railway. This crossing was called Copmanthorpe Gates, according to the 1853 OS Map, and was operated by a crossing keeper who lived in the adjacent, G. T. Andrews designed, single storey house. The 1892 map appears to show a small signal box the other side of the road to the house.

On 31 July 1854 the York and North Midland Railway merged with two other railway companies to form the North Eastern Railway.

In 1871 the North Eastern Railway built a new line from Shaftholme Junction (north of Doncaster) to Chaloners Whin Junction (1 mile 67 chains north of Copmanthorpe and where the Tesco supermarket is located today), via Selby. This was a faster route to London from the north, and as a result East Coast Main Line traffic no longer passed through Copmanthorpe.

=== Second Station ===
Between 1900 and 1904 the North Eastern Railway quadrupled the line between Chaloners Whin Junction and Church Fenton. The formation was widened and two new tracks were added to the east of the existing two, making four tracks in total. At Copmanthorpe the 1909 OS Map shows that the two 1839 sidings were removed and the goods yard on the west side closed. The level crossing was replaced by an overbridge that bisected the existing 1839 station just to the north of the 1839 station building. Both 1839 platforms were removed and replaced by an island platform situated between the two new tracks. The station building was converted to a private dwelling and a new station building built on the island platform.

The new station building had a large roof that formed awnings to both platform faces. Glass and timber end screens formed sheltered waiting areas at each end of the building. The new station was 6 chains (132 yards (121 m)) further away from York at 3 miles 63 chains.

The new road overbridge had two spans, the western one spanning three tracks and the eastern spanning one track. The brick bridge pier between the two new tracks also had a passenger access ramp on the south side down to the island platform. The ramp was supported on timber trestles and was the only way for the public to access the platform.

A new goods yard was provided on the east side and separated from the running lines by a timber fence. The layout of the goods yard was almost identical to the goods yard at Bolton Percy, the next station along the line. Two long sidings were provided either side of a raised loading dock that also doubled as a cattle pen as required. A short siding between the other two had an end on loading to the dock. A fourth long siding to the east of the others, rose up on an embankment to end in an eight cell coal drop. A goods shed was provided at the end of the first long siding and close to the overbridge. However, the siding did not enter the shed. A weighbridge and office was provided at the road entrance to the goods yard.

The 1909 OS map shows that Copmanthorpe Gates has been renamed as Copmanthorpe Moor, and the level crossing covers all four tracks and is controlled by a larger signal box. The headshunt of the goods yard extends up to this crossing. The entrance to the goods yard is controlled by a new signal box, called Copmanthorpe, located to the south of the island platform and between the two new tracks. This box was sited adjacent to the south east corner of the modern Dikes Lane housing estate, a field at the time of the 1909 OS map. Copmanthorpe signal box opened on 12 June 1904, probably the same date as the new island station opened.

In 1950 both the Copmanthorpe and Moor Lane signal boxes were demolished and a new brick signal box built at Moor Lane.

The station was closed to passenger traffic in January 1959 but the goods yard remained in use until 4 May 1964.

=== After Closure ===
The 1904 station building and island platform were demolished.

In 1983 the Selby Diversion was built and joined the York to Normanton line at Colton Junction, 2 miles (3.2 km) south of Copmanthorpe. Once again the East Coast Main Line ran through Copmanthorpe. The mileage of the line was changed when the Selby Diversion opened; instead of being measured from York, it is measured from London King's Cross via the new route through Colton. In this revised mileage, the site of Copmanthorpe Station is at 184 miles 59 chains. The Copmanthorpe Signal Box at Moor Lane crossing was closed in the same year, with control of the line passing to York signal box. To close the Moor Lane level crossing, Moor Lane itself was diverted through the site of the old goods yard to join the bottom of the 1904 bridge approach road.

As part of the electrification of the East Coast Main Line in 1988, the overbridge was replaced at a higher level to provide clearance to the overhead wires. The replacement bridge spans all four tracks; the redundant pier was demolished as part of that work.

The original 1839 station building and Moor Lane crossing keepers house are still extant as private residences, and the 1904 goods shed is used by a plant hire company.

== Route ==
Preceding station	Historical railways	Following station
York	York and North Midland Railway; Dearne Valley line	Bolton Percy; Line open, station closed

== Accidents and incidents ==
- On 15 September 1872 the 02:49 night mail from Normanton collided with the rear of the 23:30 goods train from Leeds at the 1839 Copmanthorpe station causing the last two vehicles of the goods train to derail. Eight passengers and two guards on the night mail were injured. Causes were that the signalman at Copmanthorpe had cleared distant signals for the goods train but had left the stop signal at the crossing showing danger. The driver of the goods train expected a clear run, as indicated by the distant signals, and therefore was travelling too fast to stop at the stop signal, eventually stopping with the end of his train at the north end of Copmanthorpe platform. The driver of the night mail, following on the same track, did not see the stop signal or the tail lights of the stationary goods train until too late, braked but was unable to stop in time.
- On 25 September 2006 a Virgin train service from Plymouth to Edinburgh was travelling at approximately 100 mph when it struck a car on the site of the former level crossing at Moor Lane. The car driver was fatally injured in the collision. Although three axles of the train derailed, the train remained upright and there were no injuries on board. The immediate cause of the incident was the car driving onto the railway through a fenced boundary. The train came to a stand 907 metres beyond the point of the collision, approximately adjacent to the site of the north end of the 1839 platform (that is the same track and location as the 1872 accident).
