= Wigley, Derbyshire =

Coordinates: 53.2428°N 1.5277°W

Wigley
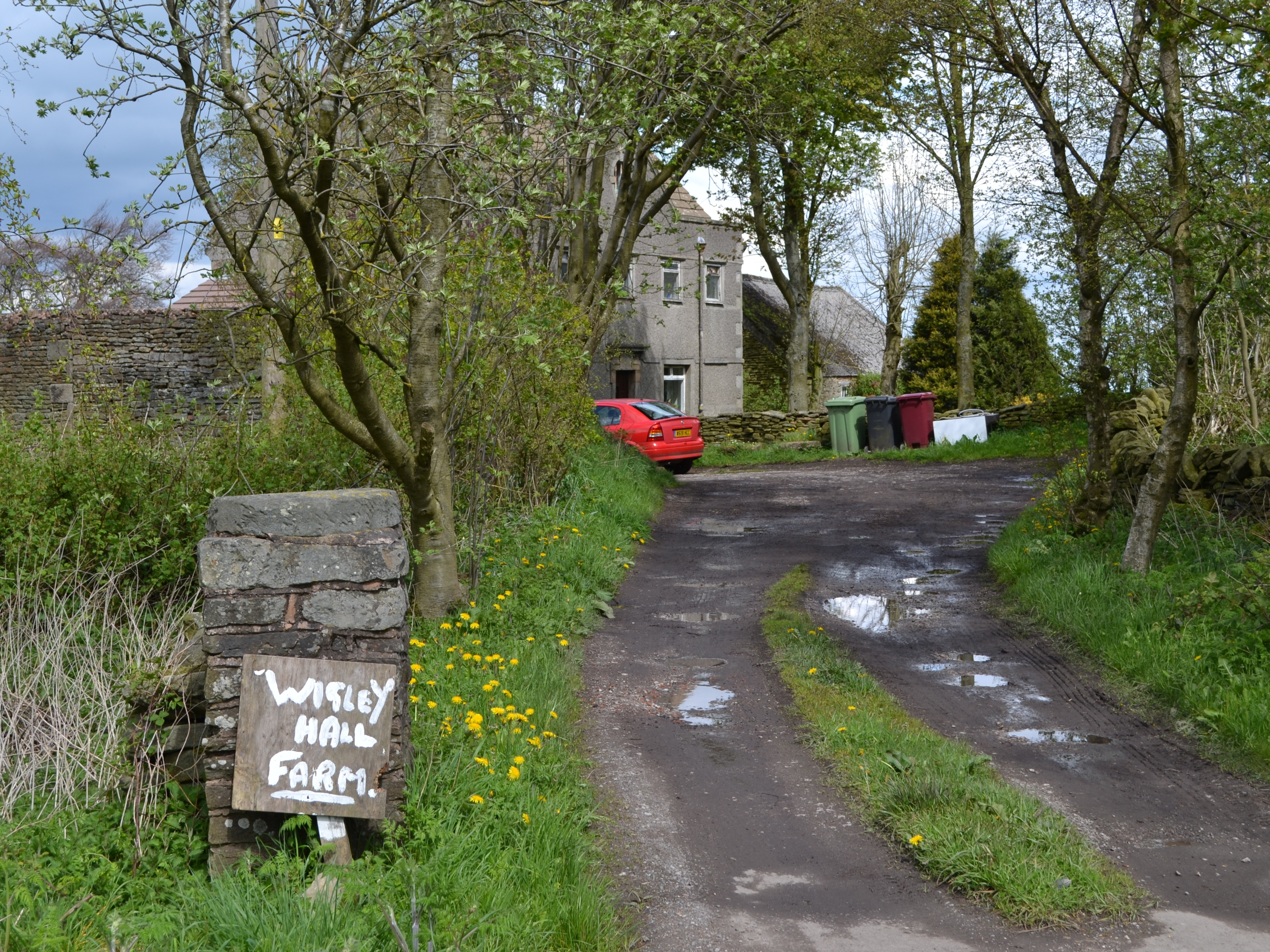
- Entrance to Wigley Hall Farm

- Location within Derbyshire
- Civil parish: Brampton
- District: North East Derbyshire
- Shire county: Derbyshire
- Region: East Midlands
- Country: England
- Sovereign state: United Kingdom
- Police: Derbyshire
- Fire: Derbyshire
- Ambulance: East Midlands

Wigley is a hamlet in the civil parish of Brampton, in the North East Derbyshire district, in the county of Derbyshire, England.

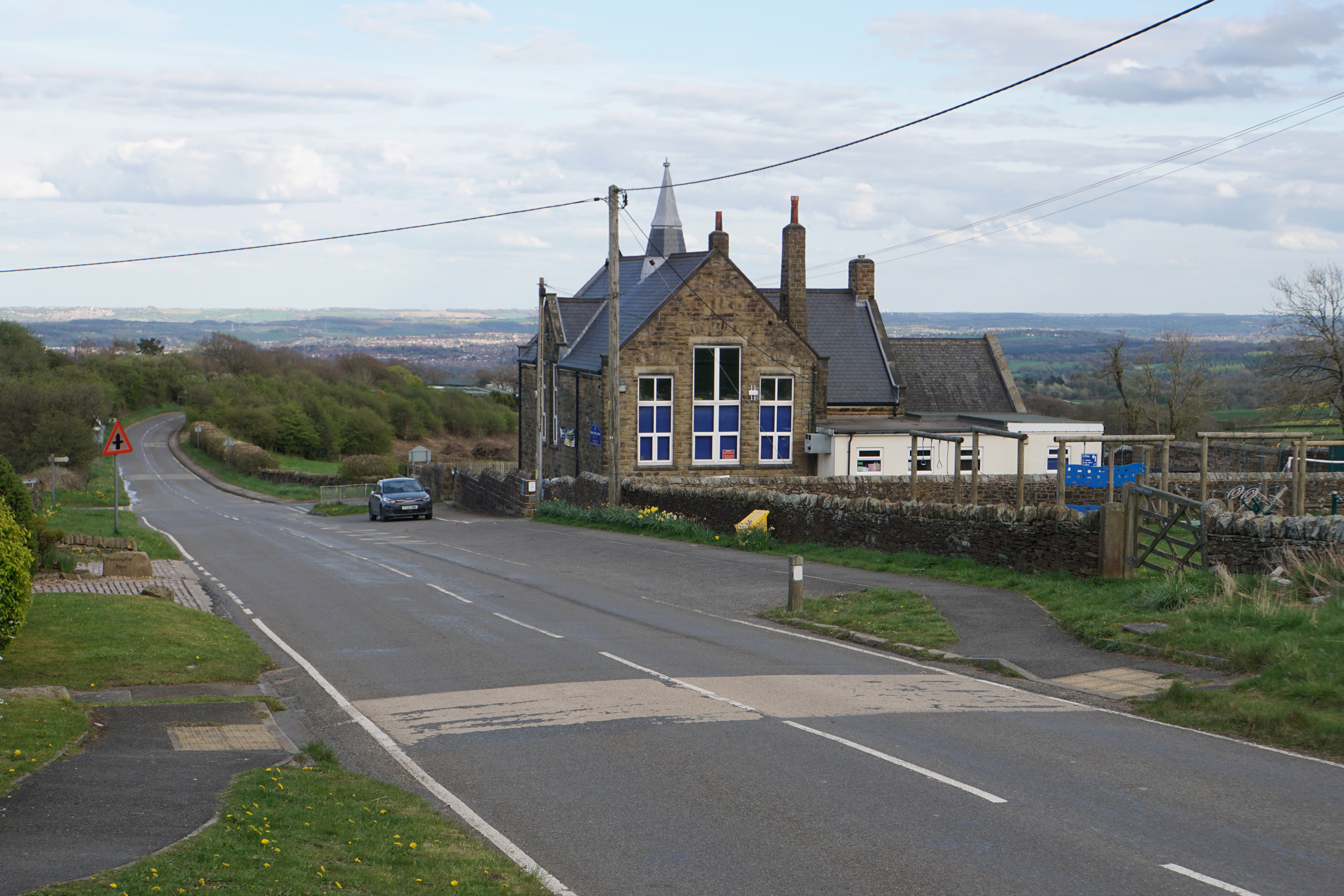
Wigley Primary School

The hamlet is located north of Wadshelf, and west of the Linacre Reservoirs.

== History ==
Wigley Hall dates back to the 1700s, and was grade II listed on 31 January, 1967.

The Wigley Primary school was established as a National School in 1882.
