= John Fawkes =

English cricketer and British Army officer

Personal information
- Full name: John Fawkes
- Born: 9 October 1933 (age 93); Brampton, Derbyshire, England
- Batting: Left-handed
- Role: Wicket-keeper

Career statistics
Competition	First-class
Matches	4
Runs scored	117
Batting average	19.50
100s/50s	–/–
Top score	41
Catches/stumpings	5/2
- Source: Cricinfo, 9 March 2019

John Fawkes (born 9 October 1933) is an English former first-class cricketer and British Army officer.

Fawkes was born at Brampton, Derbyshire. He carried out his National Service in the Royal Army Ordnance Corps as a second lieutenant, starting in October 1953. In November 1954, he was transferred from the National Service list and was promoted to the rank of lieutenant. His service took him to Kenya Colony, where he played minor matches for Kenya and East Africa. He later played first-class cricket for the Combined Services cricket team, making his debut against Warwickshire at Birmingham in 1959. He played three further first-class matches for the Combined Services in 1960, playing against Cambridge University, Surrey, and the touring South Africans. He scored 117 runs across his four matches, averaging 19.50, with a high score of 41.
