= St Peter and St Paul's Church, Old Brampton =

St Peter and St Paul’s Church, Old Brampton
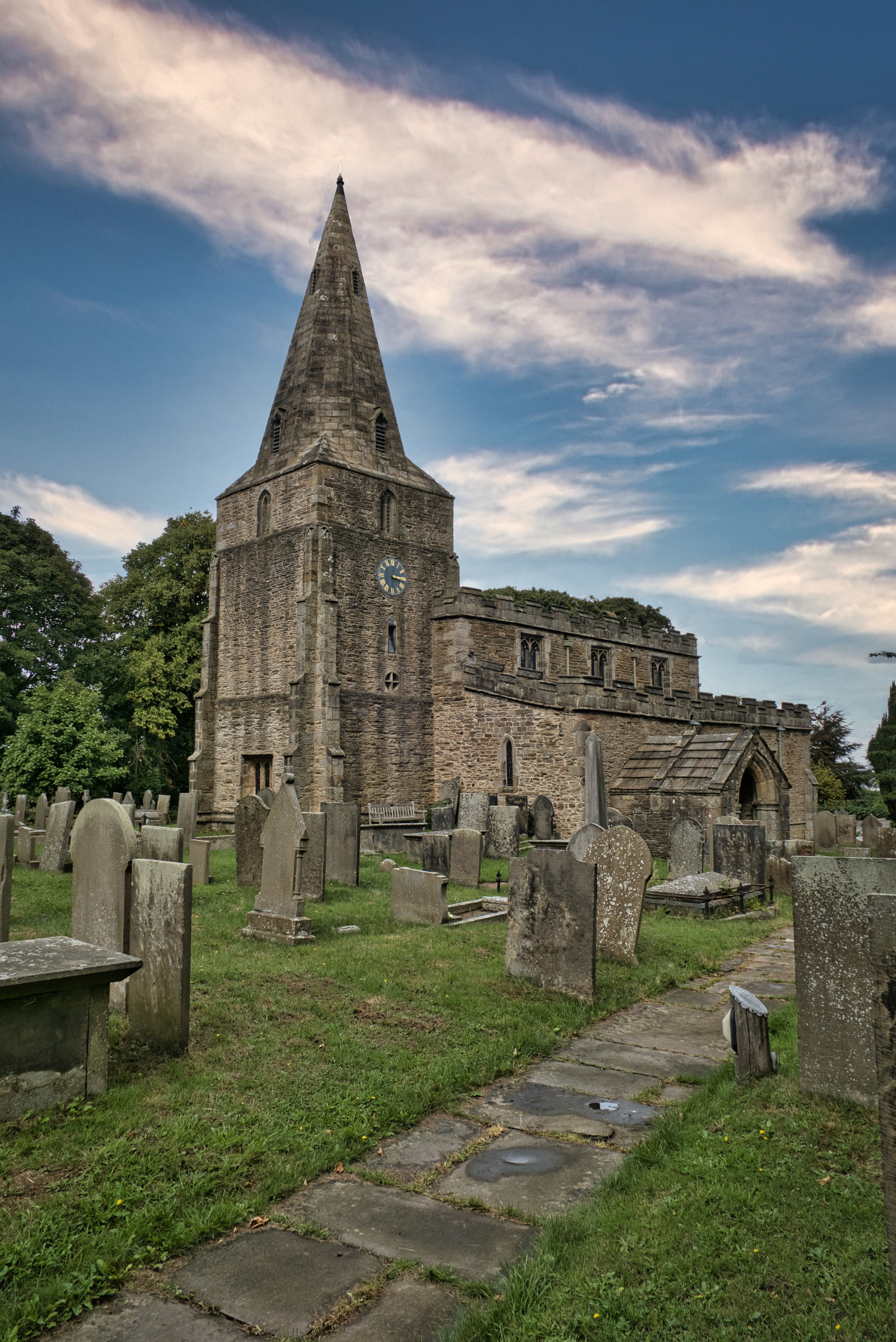
- St Peter and St Paul’s Church, Old Brampton
- St Peter and St Paul’s Church, Old Brampton
- 53°14′35.04″N 1°29′52.7″W
- Location: Old Brampton
- Country: England
- Denomination: Church of England

History
- Dedication: St Peter and St Paul

Architecture
- Heritage designation: Grade I listed

Administration
- Province: Province of Canterbury
- Diocese: Diocese of Derby
- Archdeaconry: Chesterfield
- Deanery: North East
- Parish: Old Brampton

St Peter and St Paul's Church is a Grade I listed parish church in the Church of England in Old Brampton, Brampton, North East Derbyshire.

== History ==
The porch of the church dates from the 12th century, but is mostly 14th century.

A restoration was carried out in 1868 when the roofs of the nave and south aisles were renewed, along with the walls of the clerestories. The floor was lowered to its original level and all of the windows were reglazed with ‘cathedral’ glass. The tower was opened to the church and provided with seating. The belfry staircase was built inside the church, and the masonry was cleaned. A new vestry was built at the same time. The restoration cost £1,000 and was undertaken by a local builder, Mr. Marriott of Staveley.

In 1923 the bells were recast, and a new burial ground was consecrated by the Bishop of Southwell, Sir Edwyn Hoskyns, 12th Baronet

== Organ ==
The organ dates is by Brindley & Foster and dates from 1882. It was opened on 6 December 1882 by Henry Norman Biggin, Organist of the Church of St Mary and All Saints, Chesterfield.

A specification of the organ can be found on the National Pipe Organ Register.

== Parish status ==
The church is in a joint parish with:

- St Lawrence's Church, Great Barlow
- Cutthorpe Institute, Cutthorpe

== See also ==
- Grade I listed churches in Derbyshire
- Listed buildings in Brampton, North East Derbyshire
