= Ulleskelf railway station =

Railway station in North Yorkshire, England

Ulleskelf
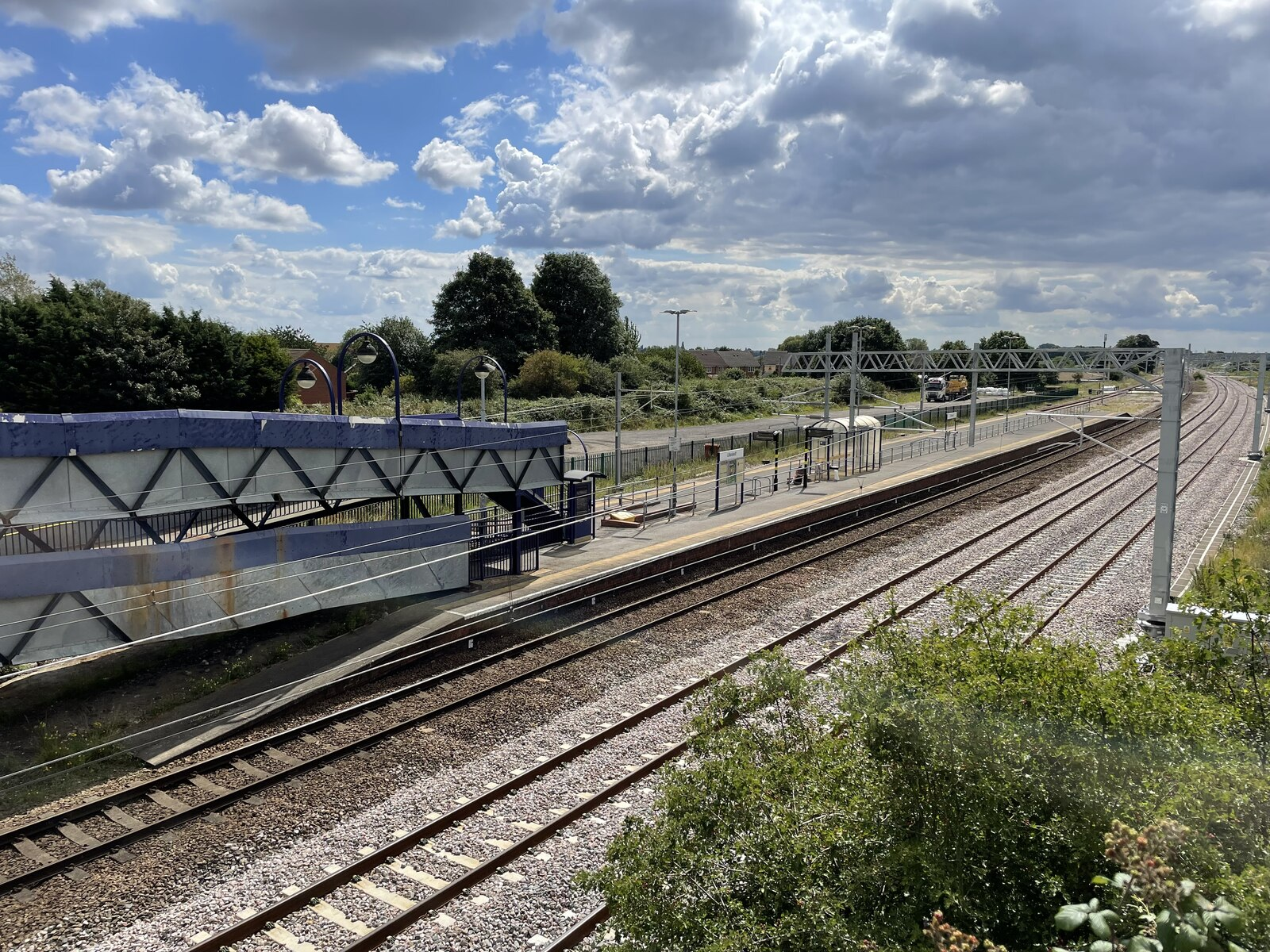
- The station in 2023, after electrification

General information
- Location: Ulleskelf, North Yorkshire; England
- Coordinates: 53.853560°N 1.214060°W
- Grid reference: SE517399
- Manager: Northern
- Platforms: 2
- Tracks: 4

Other information
- Station code: ULL
- Classification: DfT category F2

History
- Opened: 1839

Passengers
- 2021/22: ▲9,038
- 2022/23: ▲10,320
- 2023/24: ▲13,338
- 2024/25: ▲16,502
- 2025/26: ▼16,462
Location
Notes
- Passenger statistics from the Office of Rail and Road

Ulleskelf railway station in Ulleskelf, North Yorkshire, England, is 8.75 miles (14 km) south of York.

== History ==
The station opened on 29 May 1839 on the York and North Midland Railway near where it crossed the River Wharfe. It appears to have been redesigned and slightly relocated following the construction of the bridge carrying New Road (the B1223) over the tracks: the first station building was either adjacent and at right angles to the Ulleskelf Arms public house, or directly across the track from the pub on West End Road. Neither of these buildings survives. A 1888 survey shows the station in its current position on the south side of the new road bridge, with a new access road from the east end of the bridge across Hall Garth to the junction of Main Street and a newly extended Church Fenton Lane, alongside a goods yard built on the site which was a plant nursery on the 1849 map. Further evidence of this change in layout is the terrace called Station Cottages on Main Street at the junction of Church Fenton Lane, now some 200m north of, and out of sight of, the modern station. The station avoided the Beeching Axe in the mid-1960s due to the poor road network in the area (there being no easily accessible road bridge over the river for York-bound commuters). Today the station is unstaffed with all trains operated by Northern. Though there are four tracks, the island platform only serves the eastern pair.

== Accidents and incidents ==
- On 24 November 1906, a passenger train, due to foggy conditions, overran signals and ran into the rear of a freight train. Two fatalities were recorded; driver Dunham and fireman Edward Booth were killed instantaneously. Eight others were injured in the collision.
- On 8 December 1981, a York to Liverpool express derailed 1,600 feet (500 m) north of the station. Whilst the locomotive stayed upright, all the carriages de-railed and carriages six and seven rolled down a steep bank. This resulted in 24 people requiring hospitalisation with nine of those being serious. One man later died of his injuries. The cause of the derailment was found to be a crack in one of the rails of the Up Normanton line.

== Services ==
Eighteen trains call at Ulleskelf on weekdays and Saturdays, with the majority in the morning and afternoon peak periods. Nine of these run to York northbound and three each to Sheffield via Pontefract Baghill, to Leeds (with one of those continuing to Blackpool North) and to Hull (with one of those continuing to Bridlington) southbound.

Twelve trains call here on Sundays: six trains to York, four to Hull and two to Sheffield (the latter were reinstated at the winter 2025 timetable change, after being replaced by buses for several years post-pandemic). No services run to or from Leeds.

In December 1997, a wheelchair-accessible footbridge opened.

== Modernisation/electrification ==
In May 2021 as part of the Transpennine Route Upgrade, it was confirmed electrification of the line between York and Church Fenton would happen along with other upgrades. Further confirmation of the upgrade came from the publishing in November 2021 of the Integrated Rail Plan for the North and Midlands (IRP) which includes full electrification between York through Church Fenton to Manchester.

As of April 2023, electrified rail lines run through Ulleskelf.

Preceding station	National Rail	Following station
Church Fenton	Northern Dearne Valley Line	York
Church Fenton	Northern Hull-York Line	York
Church Fenton	Northern York & Selby Lines	York
	Historical railways	
Church Fenton; Line and station open	North Eastern Railway	Bolton Percy; Line open, station closed
