= St Thomas' Church, Brampton =

St Thomas’ Church, Brampton
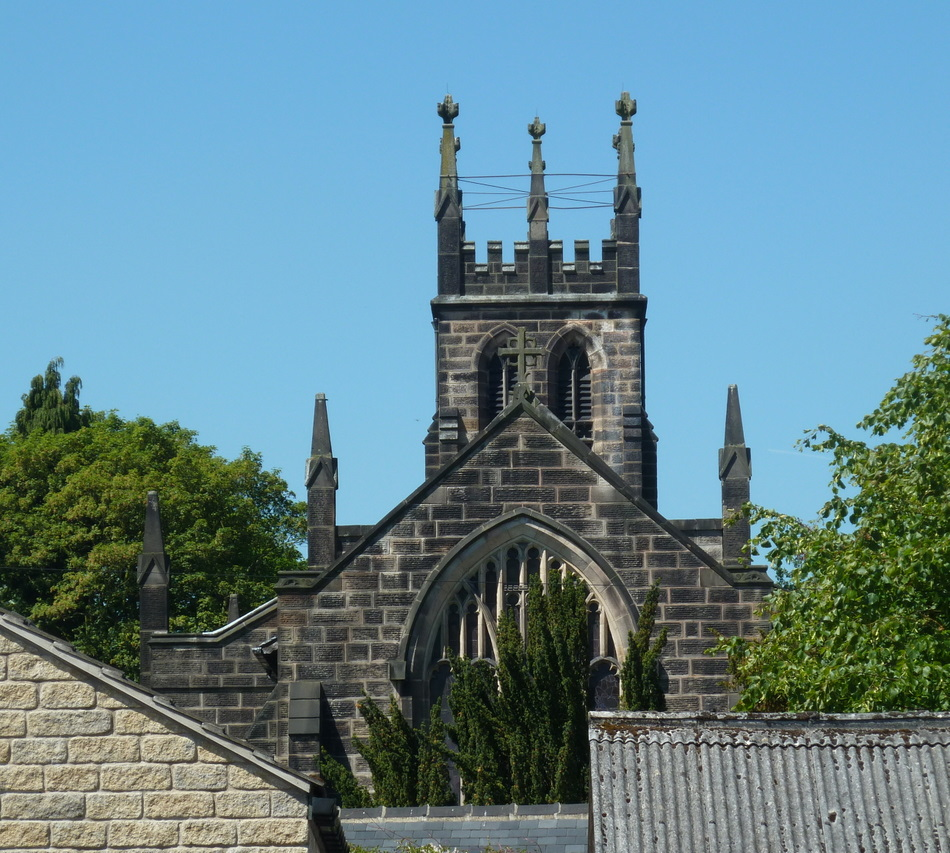
- St Thomas’ Church, Brampton
- St Thomas’ Church, Brampton
- 53°13′54.12″N 1°27′32.76″W
- OS grid reference: SK 36206 70656
- Location: Brampton, Derbyshire
- Country: England
- Denomination: Church of England
- Website: st-thomas-brampton.org

History
- Dedication: St Thomas the Martyr
- Consecrated: 9 August 1832

Architecture
- Heritage designation: Grade II listed
- Architect(s): Woodhead and Hurst
- Groundbreaking: 1830
- Completed: 1831
- Construction cost: £3,013

Administration
- Province: Canterbury
- Diocese: Derby
- Archdeaconry: Chesterfield
- Deanery: Chesterfield
- Parish: St Thomas Brampton

St Thomas’ Church, Brampton is a Grade II listed parish church in the Church of England in Brampton, Derbyshire.

== History ==
The church was built as a Commissioners' church between 1830 and 1831 by the architects John Woodhead and William Hurst. The commissioners awarded a grant of £2,063 (equivalent to £203,733 in 2025). It was consecrated on 9 August 1832.

The church was restored in 1887 when the high-backed pews were replaced with open pitch pine seating to provide accommodation for an extra 100 people. The church was cleaned and colour washed, and painted. The heating apparatus was improved. The circular communion rails were removed and replaced with straight ones. The altar was replaced and hung with curtains on either side. This restoration was carried out by Messrs. Marsden and Son of Brampton.

The foundation stone for the chancel was laid by Mrs. Alfred Barnes of Ashgate on 29 August 1888 and it was constructed by Naylor and Sale of Derby. The new chancel was consecrated by Bishop George Ridding on 7 July 1891.

The church restoration in 1903 by Cole Adams was marred by the death of a Sheffield painter, James Walter Hardy, who fell from a scaffold on 1 July 1903.

== Parish status ==
The church is in a joint parish with St Peter's Church, Holymoorside.

== Incumbents ==
- Matson Vincent 1831 - 1846 (Vicar)
- John Beridge Jebb 1846 - 1863 (Vicar)
- John Magens Mello 1863 - 1887 (Vicar, Rector from 1867)
- Charles Edward Little 1887 - 1900 (Rector)
- Edward Starkie Shuttleworth 1900 - 1906 (Rector)
- Frederick Herbert Burnside 1906 - 1925 (Rector)
- Hubert John Sillitoe 1925 - 1944 (Rector)
- John Dawson Hooley 1944 - 1957 (Rector)
- Lionel William Daffurn 1957 - 1974 (Rector)
- Vyvyan Watts-Jones 1974 - 1985 (Rector)
- Christopher John Cokayne Frith 1985 - 2003 (Rector)
- David Peter Mouncer 2003 - 2008 (Rector)
- Matthew John Barnes from 2008 - 2018 (Rector)
- David Owens from 2018 - 2021 (Acting Rector)
- Gary Weston from 2022 (Priest In Charge)

== Organ ==
The organ by Charles Lloyd of Nottingham was installed in 1906 at a cost of £534. A specification of the organ can be found on the National Pipe Organ Register.
