= East Garforth railway station =

Railway station in West Yorkshire, England

East Garforth
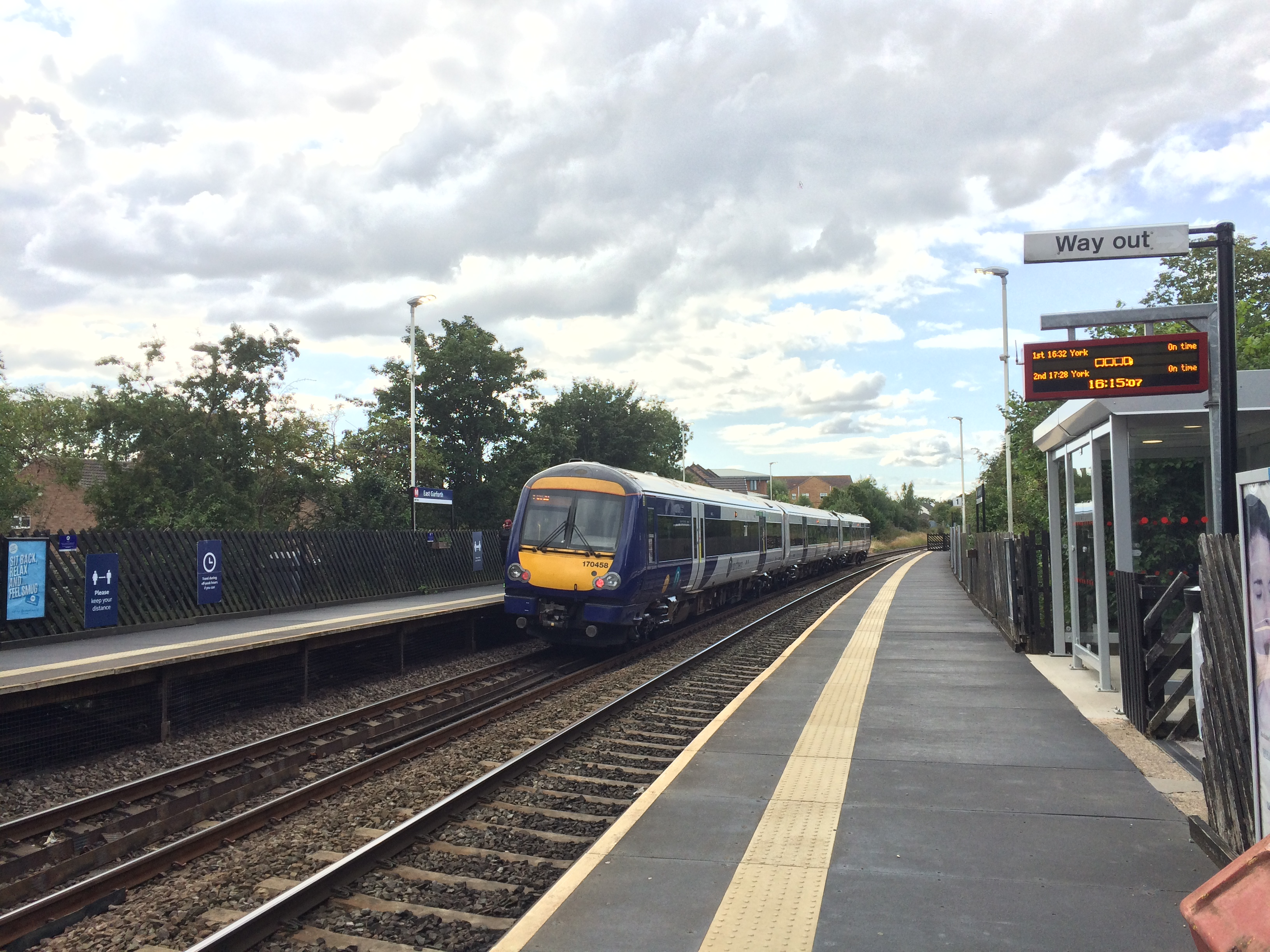
- A Northern Trains Class 170 at platform 2 (2020)

General information
- Location: Garforth, City of Leeds, England
- Coordinates: 53.792°N 1.371°W
- Grid reference: SE415330
- Managed by: Northern Trains
- Transit authority: West Yorkshire Metro
- Platforms: 2

Other information
- Station code: EGF
- Fare zone: 2
- Classification: DfT category F1

History
- Opened: 1987

Passengers
- 2020/21: ▼35,670
- 2021/22: ▲0.114 million
- 2022/23: ▲0.159 million
- 2023/24: ▲0.165 million
- 2024/25: ▲0.185 million
Location
Notes
- Passenger statistics from the Office of Rail and Road

East Garforth is one of two railway stations that serve the town of Garforth, in West Yorkshire, England; the other, Garforth, is located around 0.5 miles (800 m) away. The station lies on the Selby Line and is operated by Northern Trains. It was opened by West Yorkshire Metro in May 1987.

== Facilities ==
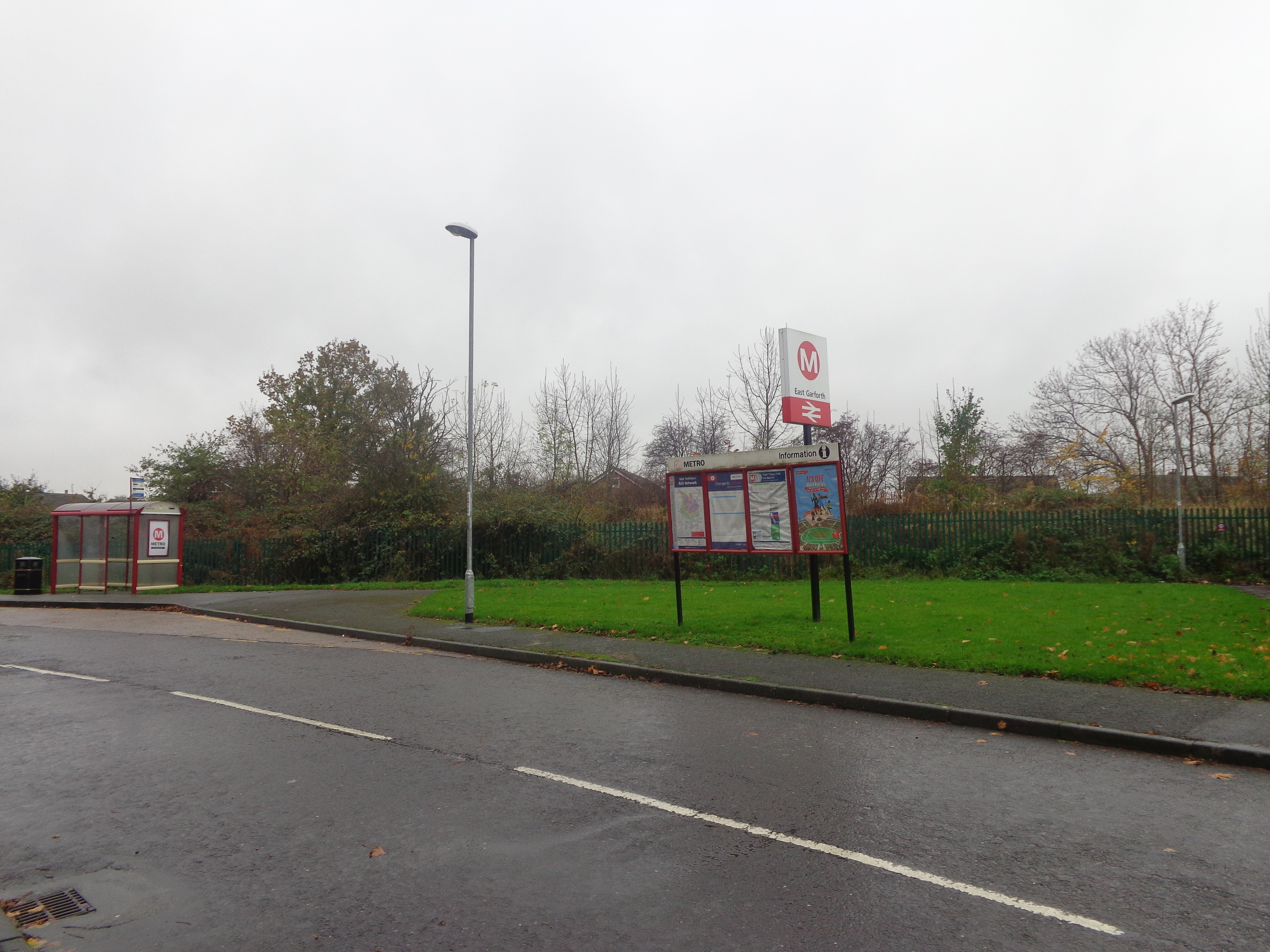
Station entrance from the bus terminus at New Sturton Lane

The station is fully accessible for wheelchair users, with ramps from the road to both platforms. Ticket machines are available for passengers to buy or collect pre-paid tickets prior to travel. Train running information is provided by a long line P.A system and digital display screens on each platform.

== Services ==
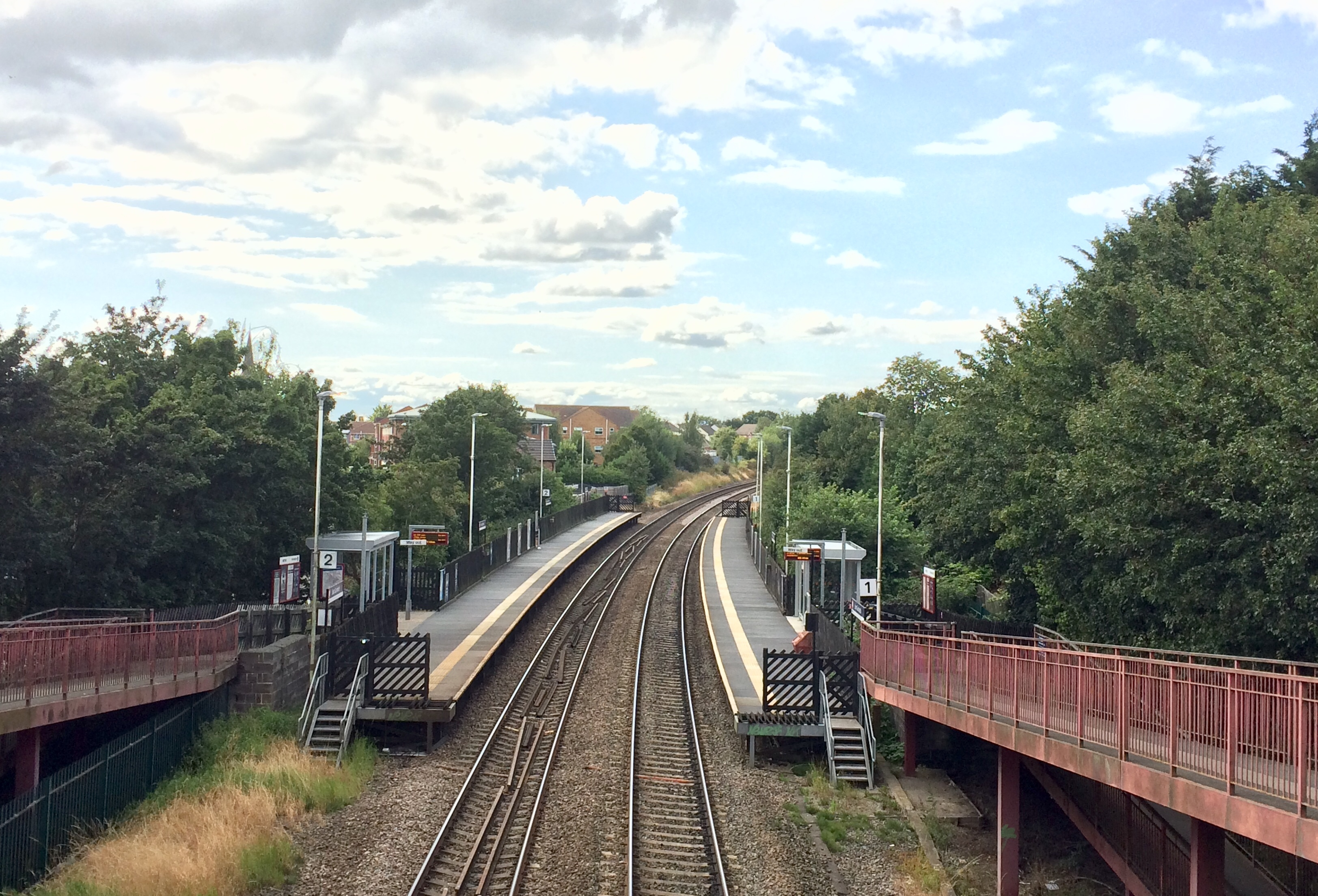
The view westward from the footbridge

Northern Trains operates the following general off-peak service, in trains per hour (tph):

- 2 tph to Leeds, of which:
  - 1 tph continues to Bradford Interchange and
  - 1 tph continues to Halifax
- 1 tph to York
- 1 tph to Hull.

Preceding station	National Rail	Following station
Garforth	Northern Trains Selby Line	Micklefield
