= Church Fenton railway station =

Railway station in North Yorkshire, England

Church Fenton
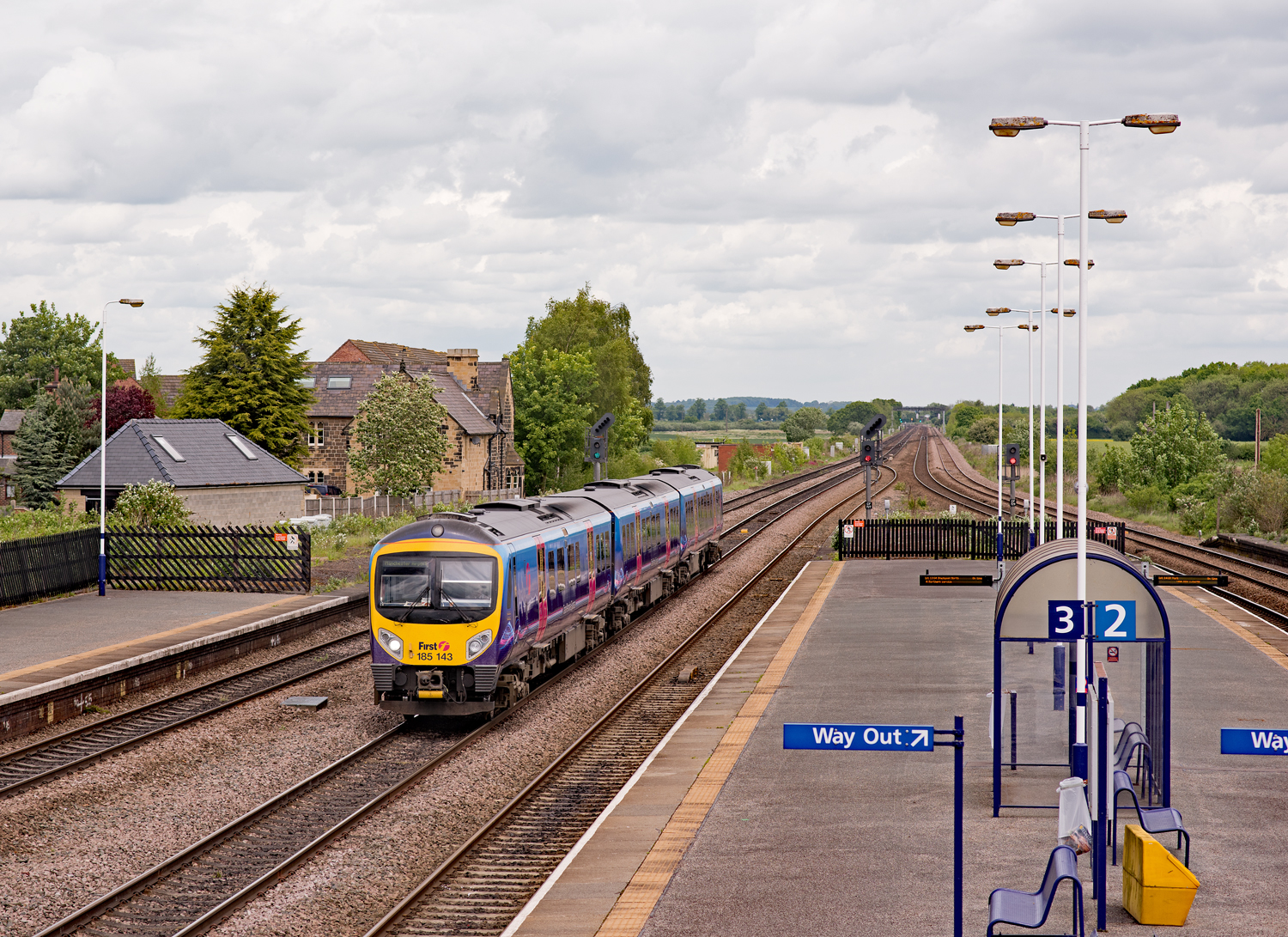
- A TransPennine Express Class 185 passing the station in 2017

General information
- Location: Church Fenton, North Yorkshire, England
- Coordinates: 53.8263°N 1.2275°W
- Grid reference: SE509369
- Managed by: Northern Trains
- Platforms: 4
- Tracks: 5

Other information
- Station code: CHF
- Classification: DfT category F2

Passengers
- 2020/21: ▼21,492
- Interchange: ▼1,219
- 2021/22: ▲0.106 million
- Interchange: ▲4,374
- 2022/23: ▲0.117 million
- Interchange: ▲9,705
- 2023/24: ▲0.146 million
- Interchange: ▲11,259
- 2024/25: ▲0.159 million
- Interchange: ▼8,663
Location
Notes
- Passenger statistics from the Office of Rail and Road

Church Fenton railway station serves the village of Church Fenton, in North Yorkshire, England. It is situated where the Cross Country Route meets the Dearne Valley line, just under 10.75 miles (17 km) from York. The station and all services that stop there are operated by Northern Trains.

== History ==
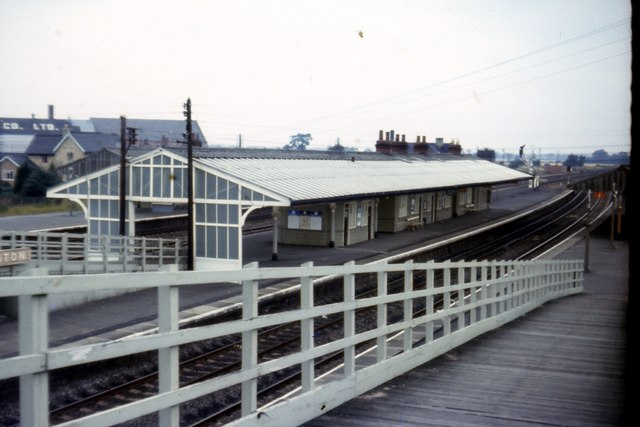
Church Fenton station in 1970, before the shelters were demolished

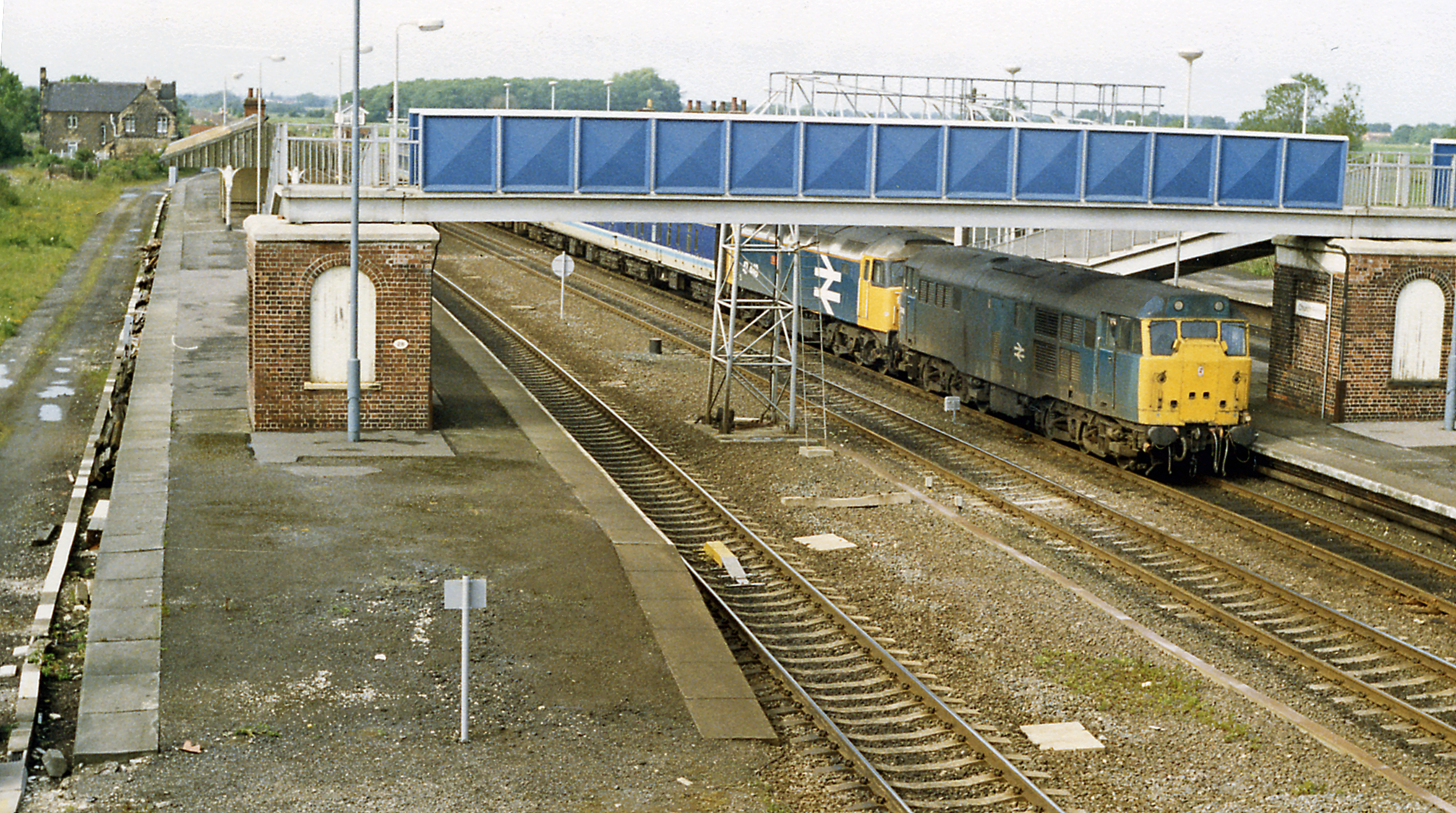
Express train passing through the station in 1988

The York and North Midland Railway opened the first part of its route through the village, and on as far as Milford, on 29 May 1839, completing it the following year. On completion of a branch from there to Harrogate, via Wetherby and Tadcaster, by the Y&NM in 1848, a new station on a slightly different site gave it new importance. Within two years, it had become a calling point on the new East Coast Main Line (ECML) from York to London King's Cross, with the opening of a line from Burton Salmon to Knottingley; trains then continued via the Askern Branch Line and Doncaster.

Further development of the station occurred in 1869, when a 5-mile (8 km) link was opened by the North Eastern Railway (NER) from there to Micklefield on the former Leeds & Selby Railway to create a new main line between Leeds and York. The NER had been looking to shorten the previous indirect route between the two cities via Castleford for some time prior to this, but plans to build a line via Tadcaster had come to nothing and so this alternative route was chosen. The existing line from here to York was subsequently quadrupled to handle the increased levels of traffic and the station substantially altered, with the addition of extra platforms and connections between the two pairs of lines.

The station lost its ECML status in 1871, when the new direct line from York to Doncaster, via Selby, was opened. Trains from London to Harrogate continued to call and yet another addition to the list of routes serving the station came in 1879, when the Swinton and Knottingley Joint Railway line via Pontefract Baghill and Ferrybridge was opened. In connection with the quadrupling of the lines, the present station was opened in 1904, slightly south of the second station.

During the High Speed 2 project, it was planned for the eastern leg of phase 2b to join the existing network at Church Fenton, with an onward connection to the East Coast Main Line.

Today, the station remains busy, even though the Harrogate line fell victim to the Beeching cuts in January 1964 and passenger trains towards Castleford ended six years later. The Leeds to York line carries a frequent passenger service, whilst the line towards Sherburn, Milford Junction and thence to Knottingley, Castleford and Pontefract carries large quantities of freight.

Northern Trains operates all services that call on the Leeds to York, Dearne Valley and Hull to York routes that run through the four operational platforms (a fifth on the western side, once used for Harrogate trains, is disused). Since the winter 2023 timetable update, scheduled passenger services towards Castleford, Wakefield Kirkgate and Huddersfield now pass through here once again (for the first time in over 50 years), but run through without stopping.

== Facilities ==
The station is covered by a long-line automatic P.A system to provide real-time train running details. Passenger information screens are also installed and there is a ticket machine available for passengers to buy tickets. Access to all four platforms is via a footbridge, so there is no step-free access to any of the platforms.

The former booking office at street level is now in private commercial use as a restaurant, but the platform level buildings were all demolished by 1990.

== Services ==
Trains at Church Fenton are operated by Northern Trains, with the following general off-peak weekday service in trains per hour/day:

- 2tph to York
- 1tph to Bridlington, via Hull Paragon
- 1tph to Blackpool North, via Leeds and Preston
- 3tpd to Sheffield

Preceding station	National Rail	Following station
Sherburn-in-Elmet	Northern Dearne Valley line	Ulleskelf
Sherburn-in-Elmet	Northern Hull–York Line	Ulleskelf
Micklefield	Northern York & Selby Lines	Ulleskelf
	Disused railways	
Terminus	North Eastern Railway; Harrogate–Church Fenton line	Stutton

== Upgrade and electrification ==
The Transpennine Route Upgrade includes electrification from Manchester to York through Church Fenton. In May 2021, it was confirmed that electrification of the line had been approved, along with other improvements. The Integrated Rail Plan for the North and Midlands published in November 2021 further confirmed this upgrade.
