= Bolton Percy railway station =

Disused railway station in North Yorkshire, England

Bolton Percy
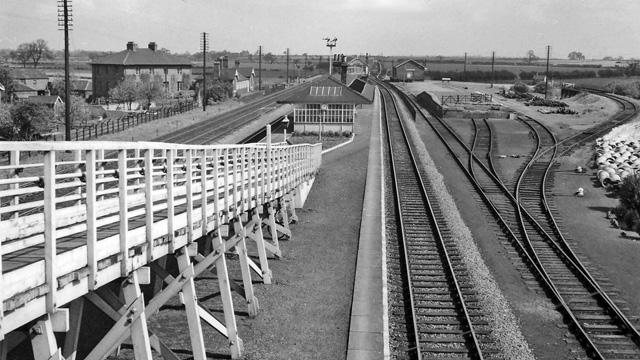
- The view north of the station in 1961

General information
- Location: Bolton Percy, North Yorkshire; England
- Coordinates: 53.8682°N 1.2001°W
- Grid reference: SE527416
- Platforms: 3

Other information
- Status: Disused

History
- Original company: York and North Midland Railway
- Pre-grouping: North Eastern Railway (UK)
- Post-grouping: LNER; British Rail (North Eastern)

Key dates
- 30 May 1839: Opened
- 13 September 1965: Closed
Location

Bolton Percy railway station served the village of Bolton Percy, North Yorkshire, England from 1839 to 1965 on the York and North Midland Railway.

== History ==
The station opened on 30 May 1839 by the York and North Midland Railway. It closed to both passengers and goods traffic on 13 September 1965. When open, it consisted of a single long island platform serving just two of the four lines, a similar configuration to that of neighbouring Ulleskelf. A large goods shed was also provided to the north of the station.

The platform and buildings were demolished after closure and no trace remains of the station today, save for a gap between the lines where the platform once stood.

Preceding station	Historical railways	Following station
Copmanthorpe; Line open, station closed	York and North Midland Railway	Ulleskelf; Line and station open
