= South Milford railway station =

Railway station in North Yorkshire, England

South Milford
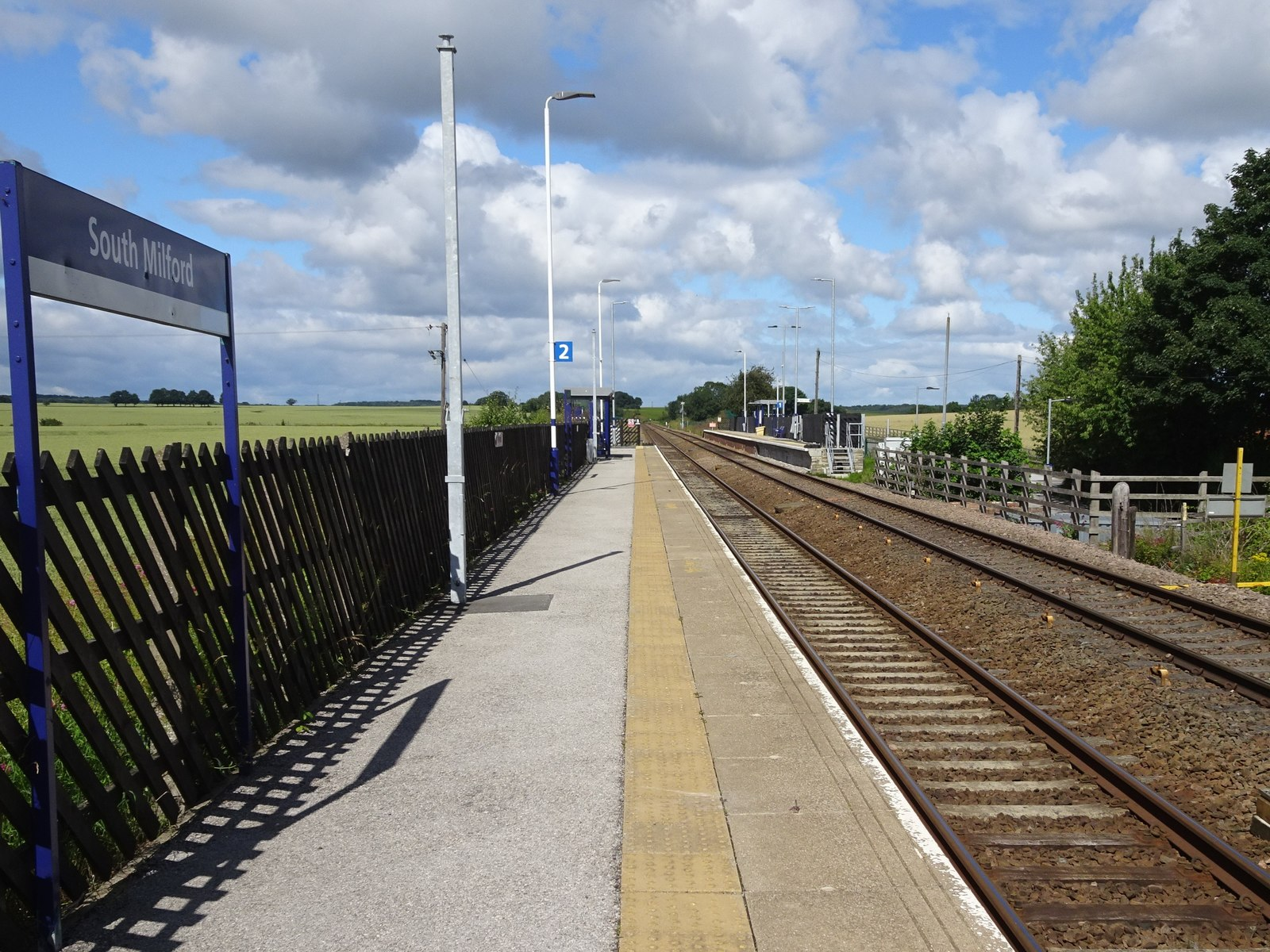
- Platform 2 looking West towards Leeds

General information
- Location: South Milford, North Yorkshire; England
- Coordinates: 53.782420°N 1.251140°W
- Grid reference: SE494320
- Managed by: Northern
- Platforms: 2

Other information
- Station code: SOM
- Classification: DfT category F1

History
- Opened: 1834

Passengers
- 2020/21: ▼26,662
- 2021/22: ▲79,192
- 2022/23: ▲97,572
- 2023/24: ▲0.124 million
- 2024/25: ▲0.136 million
Location
Notes
- Passenger statistics from the Office of Rail and Road

South Milford railway station serves the villages of South Milford and Sherburn in Elmet in North Yorkshire, England. It lies on the Selby Line 13 miles (21 km) east of Leeds.

== History ==
The station was opened in 1834 as Milford railway station on the Leeds and Selby Railway. The name was changed to South Milford station in 1867, however, some early timetables refer to the station as Milford Bridge. The Leeds and Selby Railway was leased to George Hudson, which allowed him to divert all traffic via his line through Methley. As such, between 1848 and 1850, no railway traffic moved west of Milford, and even by 1850, this was restarted as only local traffic. During the early years of operation at Milford, the platforms at the station were known to be causing problems for passengers as they were only 6 inches (150 mm) above the level of the rail lines.

Facilities at the station are limited – there are shelters on each platform and passenger information screens and ticket machines were installed in 2018 as part of a programme of station improvements by the operator. There is no footbridge or subway.

The station did have buildings and a signal box up until at least 1979 (the main building was one of the last remaining examples of original Leeds and Selby Railway architecture), but these were subsequently demolished.

== Services ==
On Monday to Saturday daytimes, the station is served by a Northern hourly local service, which runs in each direction between Hull Paragon Interchange and Halifax via Leeds and Bradford Interchange. This is an extension of the former Leeds to Selby local stopping service that called here before the winter 2019 timetable change. A few additional trains operate at peak times, running to either Selby or Leeds.

On Sundays, there is also an hourly service each way, though running between Selby and Leeds only.

One TransPennine Express service calls here on Mondays-Saturdays. It calls westbound at 07:35 and runs through to Liverpool Lime Street.

Preceding station	National Rail	Following station
Garforth	TransPennine Express North TransPennine	Selby
Micklefield	Northern Selby Line	Selby
	Historical railways	
Micklefield; Line and station open	North Eastern Railway; Leeds and Selby Railway	Gascoigne Wood Junction; Line open, station closed
