= Brampton, North East Derbyshire =

Civil parish in Derbyshire, England

Coordinates: 53.241°N 1.524°W

Brampton
- Civil parish
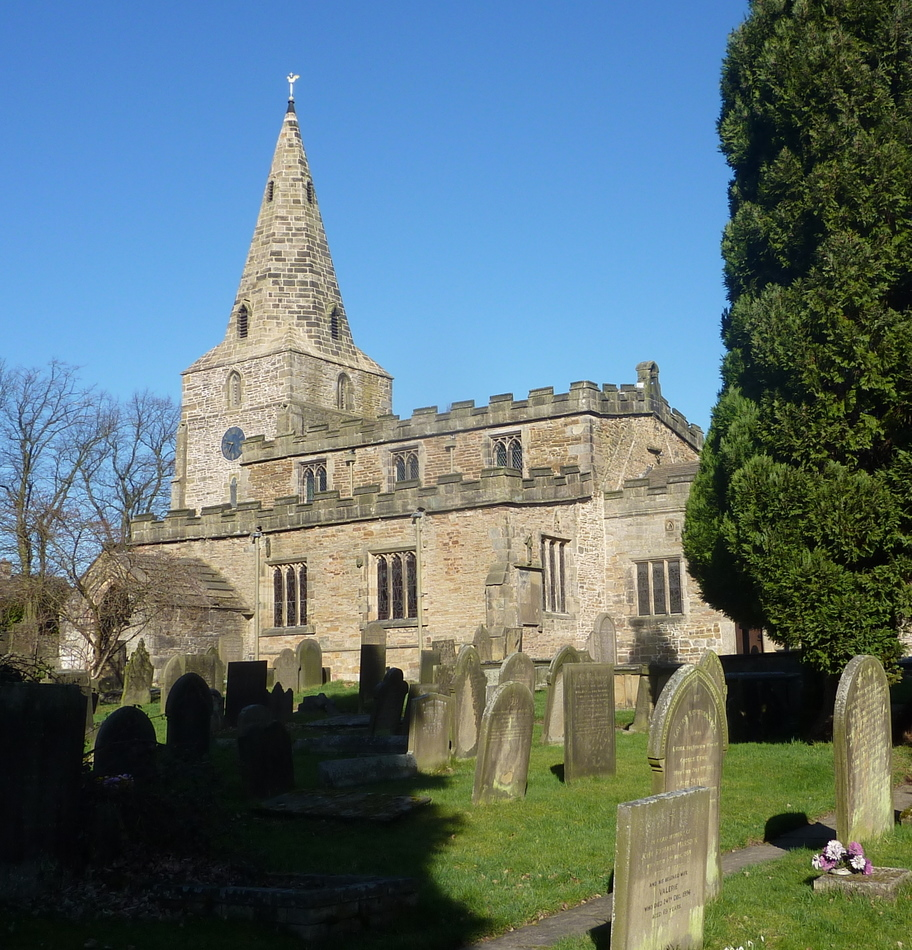
- Church of St Peter and St Paul, Old Brampton

- Location within Derbyshire
- Interactive map of Brampton
- Area: 8.12 sq mi (21.0 km^{2})
- Population: 1,188 (2021)
  - Density: 146/sq mi (56/km^{2})
- OS grid reference: SK 334719
  - London: 130 mi (210 km)
- District: North East Derbyshire
- Shire county: Derbyshire
- Region: East Midlands
- Country: England
- Sovereign state: United Kingdom
- Settlements: Old Brampton; Cutthorpe; Wadshelf; Ashgate; Birley; Eastmoor; Four Lane Ends; Freebirch; Hemming Green; Hollins; Ingmanthorpe; Overgreen; Pratthall; Riddings; Upper Newbold; Wigley; Woodnock
- Post town: CHESTERFIELD
- Postcode district: S42
- Dialling code: 01246
- Police: Derbyshire
- Fire: Derbyshire
- Ambulance: East Midlands
- UK Parliament: North East Derbyshire
- Website: bramptonparishcouncil.org

Brampton is a civil parish in North East Derbyshire, England, with a population of 1,188 in 2021. Lying 130 miles (210 km) north west of London, 20 miles (32 km) north of the county town of Derby, and 2 miles (3.2 km) west of the market town of Chesterfield, Brampton encompasses part of the Peak District national park to the west, and shares a border with the Borough of Chesterfield, Barlow, Baslow and Bubnell, Beeley, and Holymoorside and Walton. The parish contains a number of settlements including the village it was named after, but does not include the nearby built-up suburb of Brampton which is now within the Chesterfield unparished area.

== Geography ==
=== Location ===
Brampton is surrounded by the following local places:

- Barlow, Moorhall and Wilday Green to the north
- Holymoorside, Nether Loads and Upper Loads to the south
- Chesterfield to the east
- Baslow, Chatsworth and Robin Hood to the west.

It is 8.12 square miles (21.0 km^{2}; 2,100 ha) in area, 3.6 miles (5.8 km) in height and 4.2 miles (6.8 km) in width, spanning across all the western edge of the North East Derbyshire district, fitting between Chesterfield and the Derbyshire Dales districts. The parish lies in the north west of the district and central portion of Derbyshire county.

The parish is roughly bounded by land features such as the Sud Brook and B6050 route to the north, Blackleach and Umberley brooks to the west, Holme Brook and Loundsley Green housing estate to the east, and the A619 road to the south. Brampton contains a portion of the Peak District National Park, within the western portion of the parish by Brampton East Moor.

==== Settlements and routes ====
There are three main villages within the parish:

- Old Brampton is along the old turnpike road from Chesterfield, and is to the east of the area
- Cutthorpe along the B6050 road, 1 mile (1.6 km) north east of Old Brampton
- Wadshelf is in the south west, 1 1/3 miles (2.1 km) from Old Brampton, and is along the A619 route

There are also a number of hamlets throughout, some of which are little more than single houses or farms:

- Along the Old Brampton lane: Ashgate, Hemming Green, Hollins, Riddings, Wigley and Woodnock
- Aligned to the Cutthorpe road: Birley, Four Lane Ends/Upper Newbold, Freebirch, Ingmanthorpe, Overgreen and Pratthall
- On the Wadshelf route: Eastmoor

Outside of these settlements, the parish is predominantly an agricultural and rural area.

The key route through the parish is the A619 road from Chesterfield through to Baslow, for access to the Peak District, running through the west portion of the area.

=== Environment ===
==== Landscape ====
Primarily farming and pasture land throughout the parish outside the populated areas, there is some forestry throughout, mainly at Linacre Park which is a collection of named woods north of Old Brampton village surrounding a trio of former reservoirs. There is a wooded location along the Sud Brook north of Cutthorpe, and a further area of trees east of Wadshelf. The south western corner of the parish is uncultivated moorland, much of which is heath and bogland, with few trees and is part of the wider Northeast Derbyshire Moors, this section is known as the Brampton East Moor and forms the boundary of the Peak District, and so named because it is the easternmost moor of this region.

==== Geology ====
Being partly within the Peak District National Park, the composition of the parish is broadly similar, with clay, coal, limestone, and gritstone featuring in the geology of the wider area. It rises through mudstones, sandstones and siltstone, making up the Pennine Lower Coal Measures Group formed between 319 and 318 million years ago during the Carboniferous period. The East Moor area additionally has peat which is a sedimentary superficial deposit formed between 2.588 million years ago and the present during the Quaternary period.

==== Water features ====
The Linacre Reservoirs are a notable amenity to the centre east of the parish within Linacre Park, and was once used for providing water for Chesterfield, but became non-operational in 1995, instead reverting to a leisure and habitat destination owned by the local water board, Severn Trent. The Birley Brook feeds the reservoirs and the Linacre Brook is the outlet which forms a section of the eastern parish edge. Sud Brook forms much of the northern perimeter of the parish, the Blackleach, Umberley and Wadshelf are interconnecting brooks shaping the western perimeter while an unnamed minor tributary of the River Hipper creates some of the southern boundary.

==== Land elevation ====
The parish rises from the east towards the west, with the lowest points around the south eastern River Hipper valley and the east boundary by the Linacre Brook, both at ~110 metres (360 ft), while Cutthorpe also to the east is in the range of 150–175 metres (492–574 ft). The area around Old Brampton varies from 175–200 metres (574–656 ft) while Wadshelf near the A619 road is 250–275 metres (820–902 ft). Grange Hill near Birley reaches 300 metres (980 ft), with the parish peak in the Peak District moorland by East Moor along the south western parish border at 340 metres (1,120 ft).

== History ==
=== Toponymy ===
Three local places were recorded at the time of the Domesday Book survey in 1086:

- Brampton was derived from the farm or town 'where brooms were grown', and was then known as Brantune.
- Wadshelf was reported as Wadescel which stood for 'Wada's sloping-land'.
- Upper Newbold is now mainly a residential area built in the 20th century. It is named after the nearby medieval village of Newbold 1 mile (1.6 km) to the east within lower ground, which was recorded within the survey and has grown to be a suburb of Chesterfield. Newbold was noted in 1086 as Newebold and stands for 'new building'.

Although a key area within the parish but not recorded at the time of the survey, Cutthorpe is formed by 'Cut(t)'s outlying farm', the Cutts being a notable local family from the 14th century, and the place name first appearing in public record from the 15th century.

=== Events ===
==== Prehistory to medieval, manors and early economy ====
Evidence of prehistoric remains have been discovered throughout the parish, but mainly in the west. These date local occupation from 4000BC onwards, with artefacts including flint scatter and tools. Later monuments include a number of barrows such as Stone Low in East Moor which shows human activity in the Bronze Age from 2350BC. Cairnfields are recorded in the vicinity, demonstrating an early field system in use also around this time, along with funerary uses. Pottery examples were also found locally, possibly of Roman origin (43AD to 405AD). The Domesday survey reported three manors in Brampton in 1086 AD, the Derbyshire tenants-in-chief Ascoit (or Hascoit) Musard and Walter D'Aincourt owning two, and the third respectively.

Later, the consolidated manor of Brampton was granted by Henry II to Peter de Brampton, who is believed to have been the second son of Matilda de Cauz, or Caus, who became heiress of the Barony of Caus, through Adam de Birkin, her second husband. Descendants of Peter then took on the name of De Caus, however the male line became extinct around 1460. The manor of Brampton, then known as Caus-hall, became by eventual purchase, the property of the Earls of Shrewsbury, and later on to the Earl of Newcastle. Having passed with other estates to the Duke of Portland, it was included in an exchange with the Duke of Devonshire. The seat of Cauz Hall in the east of the parish eventually became derelict with few remains by the 19th century.

Birley Grange farm was built in the 16th and 17th centuries, but was the earlier location of a grange affiliated to the Cistercian monks of Louth Park Abbey, granted by another landowner, Sir Walter de Abbetoft towards the end of the 12th century. There was other medieval and later non-agricultural industry; there was possible lead smelting at Puddingpie Hill or Freebirch and the Linacre woods but known lead workings at the edge of Beeley Moor in the 18th century, along with wood or corn milling in the 1600s near Linacre, coal mining and burning, and quarrying for sandstone, slate and clay up to the 19th century. The several sites of clay mining also helped establish a small pottery works at Eastmoor during the 1800s. As well as Cauz Hall, a number of notable country houses were built including Linacre House at which Thomas Linacre was born in the 1400s and who became physician to Henry VII and Henry VIII, with ownership in the 16th century by Roger Foljambe of the Foljambe family but demolished after 1938,

Cutthorpe Hall which was lived in by Dr. Gilbert Heathcote, a possible physician to Queen Anne, New House (later known as Brampton Manor) which was developed in around 1600 and Cutthorpe Old Hall erected in 1625. The parish in those times was more extensive than now; the boundary being only half a mile away from Chesterfield centre, terminating by what is now West Bars and following the River Hipper to also encompass Holy Moor, along with the settlements of Upper and Nether Loads as well as Holymoorside. Until the mid-18th century, the area west of Chesterfield comprised a rural location of dispersed farms, hamlets and open fields with no large groupings of residents. The central focus of this area was the church of St Peter and St Paul, in existence since 1253, although there was evidence of a chapel prior to this on the same site by 1100. A school was erected in Old Brampton in 1830 and was aligned to the church, it was superseded by one built at Wigley in 1895. Cutthorpe has had a school since 1860, the present site in use since 1884.

==== Industrial Revolution to present day ====
From the latter half of the 18th century with the arrival of the Industrial Revolution, businesses began to build on the banks of the River Hipper close to Chesterfield. Local raw materials being readily available including coal, iron, clay and a supply of water providing good conditions for development. With the improvement in transport including two roads through the parish improved by various turnpike trusts, the road from Chesterfield through Old Brampton to Peak Forest and from Eastmoor to Wardlow both being tolled in 1759, along with the Chesterfield Canal opening in 1777, this greatly facilitated the movement of goods locally. By the end of the 18th century a number of industries had been started, with two potteries in Upper Moor and another on the Walton side of the Hipper. An iron foundry started by John Smith of Sheffield in 1775 prospered and this expanded to become the Griffin Works. Army requirements during the Napoleonic Wars kept the foundry flourishing into the early 1800s. Although the foundry did not survive the post War slump and was sold in the 1830s, a smaller foundry was established in 1827.

Once the Griffin Works was closed, a candle wick and tape factory was begun at Brampton Moor. Expansion continued into the later 19th century, with the site eventually becoming known as Bump Mill, several new potteries were opened with as many as twelve operating at one time during the 19th century. Other new concerns included tobacco manufacturing, woollen cloth production, bobbin making, brewing pillbox making and lint manufacture, the last two owned by the Robinson family, who steadily expanded their business on the Wheatbridge site adjacent to the former Griffin Works and eventually absorbed the Bump Mill site and business. This growth required a need for a good supply of drinking water, and the Linacre Reservoirs were built in 1855–1904. Cutthorpe Colliery also known as Ingmanthorpe Colliery was established in 1884 close to Four Lane Ends, although it was outside the parish at the time, it closed in 1924.

The development of these businesses resulted in the community living along the banks of the River Hipper to grow. As the industrial area expanded, the community gradually shifted from being traditional agricultural labourers, and this required substantial numbers of new housing for people attracted to the area by the prospect of regular employment. By the end of the 18th century, the population had increased almost four-fold, settling primarily at the eastern end of the parish of Brampton and warranting the building of another parish church, St Thomas's in 1832. This new area was eventually known as New Brampton and later it was referred to as simply Brampton, while the village area around St Peter and St Paul's became known as Old Brampton, although officially the parish encompassing both these settlements was still named Brampton. Predictably, a number of public houses, inns and taverns sprang up to cater to this burgeoning population, and this developed into the modern day 'Brampton Mile', eventually growing to around 20 of these establishments spread across this distance.

The Midland Railway opened a railway line spur called the Brampton Branch in 1873, which served a number of industries in the area. 1892 was the beginning of a loss of territory, much of New Brampton was absorbed into Chesterfield parish and borough, with further land transfers in 1910 and 1920, to provide land for housing. In 1935, the southern area of Brampton parish comprising Chanderhill, Holymoorside and Holy Moor was transferred to Walton. Additional exchanges occurred in April 1988 with Upper Newbold/Four Lane Ends being added to Brampton, but a loss of the Loundsley Green area to Chesterfield. The notorious Pottery Cottage murders took place in Eastmoor during 1977, when a fugitive fleeing from the authorities held a family hostage at a local residence over several days. The Linacre reservoirs were made non-operational in 1995 but the site kept open and reformed into a habitat and leisure destination.

== Governance and demography ==
=== Population ===
There are 1,188 residents recorded within the parish for the 2021 census, a drop (1%) from 1,201 at the 2011 census, which was an increase of 43 (4%) from 1,158 at the 2001 census.

=== Local bodies ===
Brampton parish is managed at the first level of public administration through a parish council. At district level, the wider area is overseen by North East Derbyshire district council and is within its Brampton & Walton ward. The parish is within the Dronfield Woodhouse & Walton electoral division of Derbyshire County Council, which provides the highest level strategic services locally.

== Economy ==
The present business sector types in the parish are varied, but are located evenly throughout except for the moor areas, with these employment areas including:

- Industrial equipment hire
- Quarrying of sandstone and slate
- Several residences and farms provide holiday accommodation, caravan pitches and bed & breakfast facilities, catering to Peak District visitors.
- Animal welfare services

== Community and leisure ==
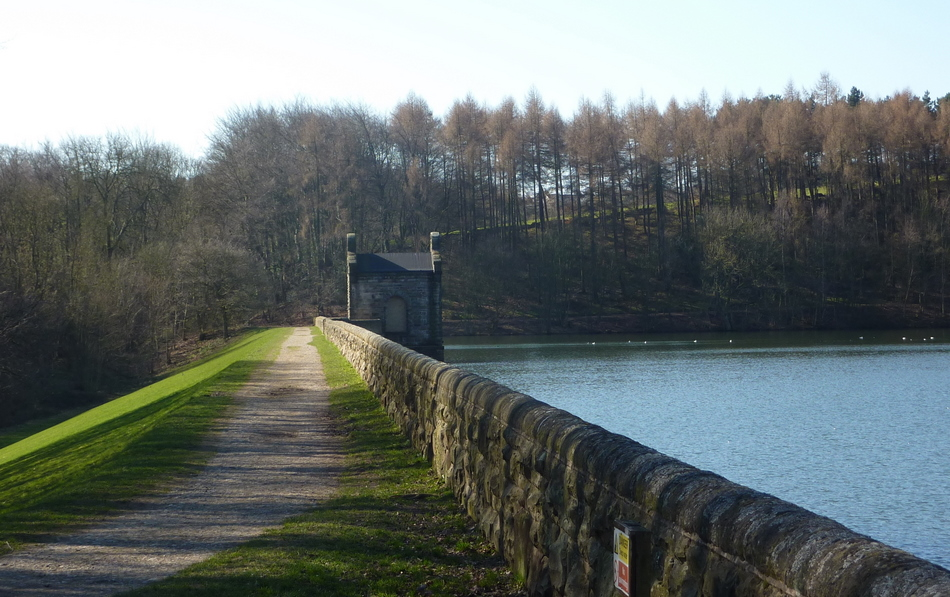
Linacre Middle Reservoir

=== Amenities and events ===
There are village halls and children play areas at Cutthorpe and Wadshelf, along with a recreation ground at Cutthorpe. Cutthorpe Cricket Club, founded in 1918, puts out four teams on a Saturday, making it the largest club in the Chesterfield area.

The School Room at Old Brampton is also used as a public meeting place.

There are six public houses in the parish, at Cutthorpe and Wigley.

Specialist healthcare services and a disabled support centre are in Ashgate.

Cutthorpe hosts an annual festival held in July together with a traditional well dressing ceremony.

== Education ==
There are primary schools at Cutthorpe and Wigley villages.

== Landmarks ==
=== Listed buildings ===
There are 37 locations of architectural merit throughout the parish with listed status, the majority at Grade II, including notably:

- Church of St Peter and St Paul at Grade I, dating from the 13th century
- Cutthorpe Hall at Grade II*
- A cruck barn at Frith Farm with a number of trusses and possibly the largest of its kind in Derbyshire, at Grade II* and dating from 1602

and comprising a range of varied buildings and structures such as halls, chapels, cottages, farmhouses, barns and other agricultural outbuildings, and guide posts.

=== Conservation ===
There are four conservation areas of special architectural or historic interest, in the parish, at Cutthorpe, Old Brampton, Pratt Hall and Wadshelf offering protection from inappropriate development to much of the core of those villages.

There are five scheduled monuments, four of which are all in Brampton East Moor/Peak District and are cairn or barrow related items. The last is the Linacre smelt mill site within Linacre Park, in use from the end of the 16th century for less than 20 years.

The extensive Peak District national park is delineated by several minor roads in the west of the parish. The area enclosed between those and the parish western perimeter is the Brampton East Moor, which is a part of the wider Eastern Peak District Moors site of special scientific interest (SSSI).

=== War memorial ===
A monument commemorating locals who served in but did not return from the World War I and WWII conflicts is within the Church of St Peter and St Paul's churchyard at Old Brampton village. It was first erected in 1920 from nearby Darley Dale stone with additional names inscribed in the later 1940s.

== Sport ==
=== Cricket ===
Cutthorpe Cricket Club has a history dating back to 1918. The club ground is located on Main Road, Cutthorpe, and they field 5 Senior XI teams in the Derbyshire County Cricket League, 3 Women's teams in the East Midlands Women’s Cricket League, and a long established Junior training section that play competitive cricket in the North Derbyshire Youth Cricket League.

== Religious sites ==
St Peter and St Paul's Church in the Old Brampton village was built in the 12th century, but substantially restored in the 13th, 14th, 19th and 20th centuries.

== Notable people ==
- Thomas Linacre (c.1460–1524), physician and theologian
