= Micklefield railway station =

Railway station in West Yorkshire, England

Micklefield
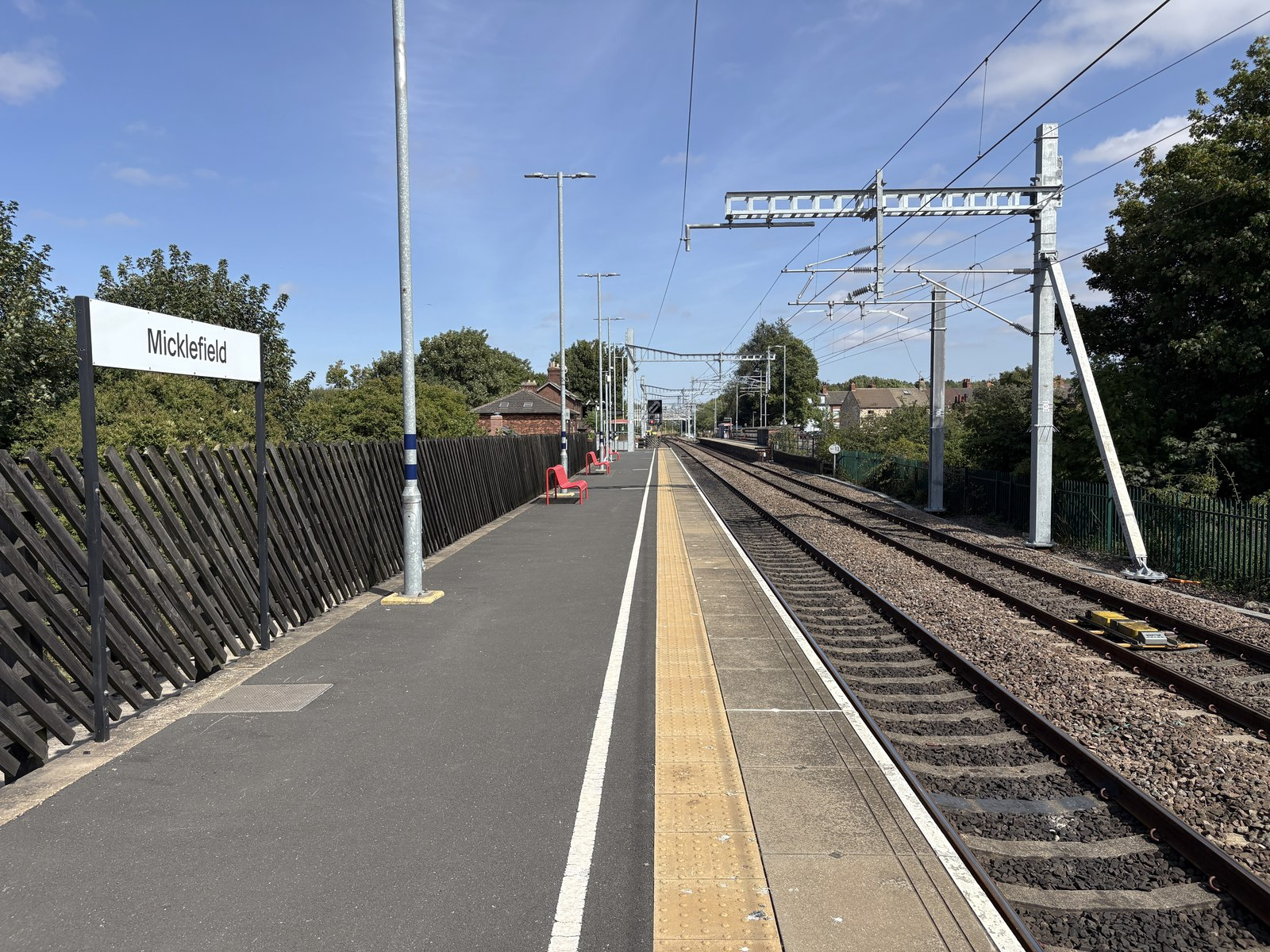

General information
- Location: Micklefield, City of Leeds; England
- Coordinates: 53.7887°N 1.3254°W
- Grid reference: SE445326
- Manager: Northern
- Transit authority: West Yorkshire Metro
- Platforms: 2

Other information
- Station code: MIK
- Fare zone: 3
- Classification: DfT category F1

History
- Opened: 1834

Passengers
- 2020/21: ▼49,598
- Interchange: ▼360
- 2021/22: ▲0.142 million
- Interchange: ▲1,563
- 2022/23: ▲0.174 million
- Interchange: ▲1,733
- 2023/24: ▲0.200 million
- Interchange: ▲2,032
- 2024/25: ▲0.220 million
- Interchange: ▼2,024
Location
Notes
- Passenger statistics from the Office of Rail and Road

Micklefield railway station serves the village of Micklefield, near Garforth in West Yorkshire, England. It lies on the Selby and York Lines, operated by Northern, 9.75 miles (16 km) east of Leeds.

Just east of the station, the York and Selby Lines split in their respective directions.

== History ==
The station was originally opened by the Leeds and Selby Railway in 1834, though buildings were not erected (on the north side) until the following year. The line towards Church Fenton was added by the North Eastern Railway in 1869 and four years later the first of two rounds of improvements to the station were initiated, with the rebuilding of the 1835 station house. Even after this was completed, there were complaints leveled at the NER by local travellers over the facilities on offer and so in 1879, the contract for a completely new station was placed. This included new platforms, footbridge and a booking office on the westbound platform, along with access from the original A1 Great North Road (since bypassed - the present A1 crosses the railway to the east, near the junction of the two lines). The buildings and bridge were demolished in the 1970s (though the older station house still stands) and there are now only basic waiting shelters on each (staggered) platform. The railway line was electrified in 2026.

== Facilities ==
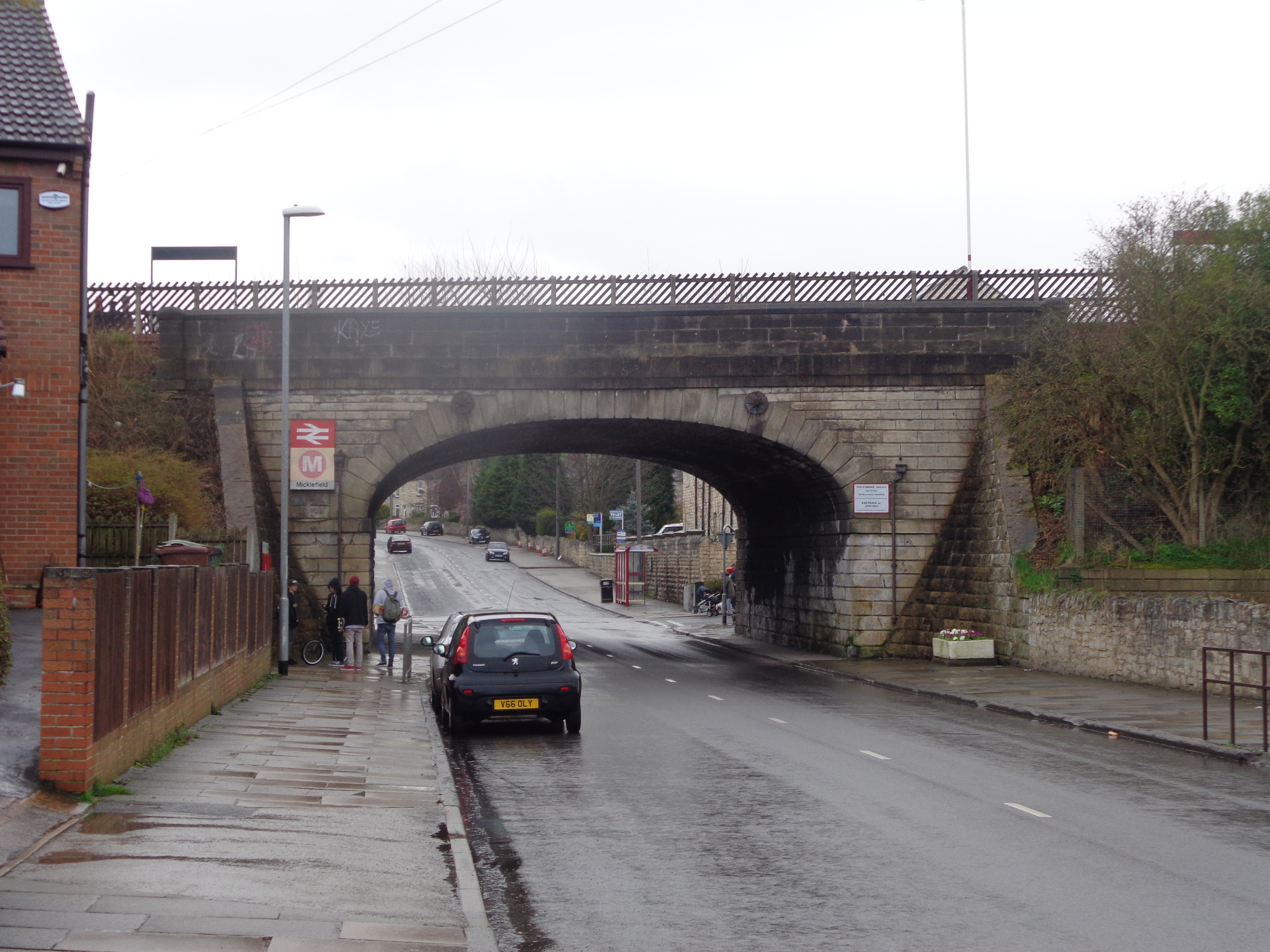
The entrance to the station from Great North Road

The station is unstaffed but now has a pair of ticket vending machines available to allow passengers to buy tickets prior to travel or collect advance purchase ones. Train running information is provided via customer information screens, automated announcements and timetable poster boards. Step-free access is available to both platforms.

== Services ==
Monday to Saturday, there is a half-hourly service calling at all stations to Leeds westbound and alternately to York (express) and Hull via Selby eastbound. Alternate Leeds-bound trains run through to Halifax via Bradford Interchange - this service commenced at the winter 2019 timetable change and serves South Milford and Selby, then runs express to Brough and Hull. Only a small number of trains towards York (in the early morning and late evening) serve the neighbouring station at Church Fenton, as this is primarily served by the York to Blackpool service that doesn't stop here.

On Sundays, there are two trains per hour to Leeds and one each to York and Selby. The through trains to Blackpool North via Preston that formerly called here on Sundays no longer do so and passengers wishing to travel there must change at Leeds.

== Notes ==
Preceding station	National Rail	Following station
East Garforth	Northern York Line	Church Fenton
East Garforth	Northern Selby Line	South Milford
