= Ingmanthorpe, Derbyshire =

Hamlet in Derbyshire, England

Coordinates: 53°15′23″N 01°30′19″W

Ingmanthorpe
- Hamlet
- Location within Derbyshire
- Country: England
- Region: East Midlands
- County: Derbyshire
- District: North East Derbyshire

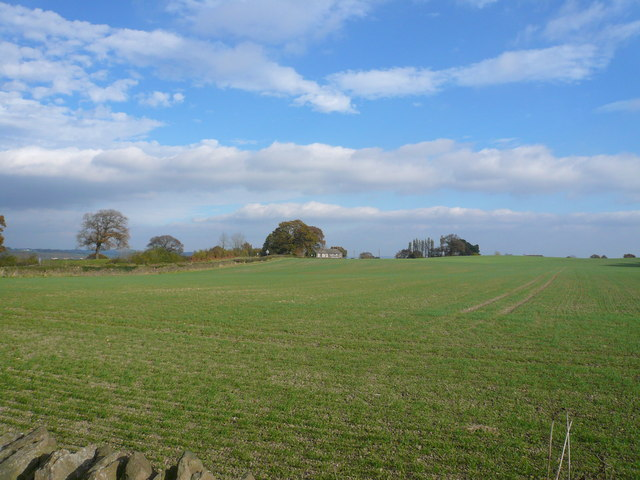
Ingmanthorpe

Ingmanthorpe is a hamlet in Brampton, Derbyshire, England.

Ingmanthorpe is located on the B6050 road some 3 miles (4.8 km) west of the town of Chesterfield.
