= Wadshelf =

Coordinates: 53.233°N 1.529°W

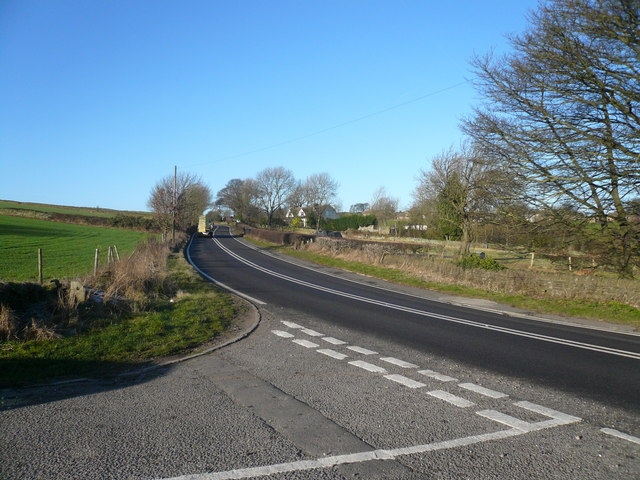
- Junction of Hallcliff Lane and Baslow Road, Wadshelf.

- Location within Derbyshire
- OS grid reference: SK315707
- Civil parish: Brampton
- District: North East Derbyshire
- Shire county: Derbyshire
- Region: East Midlands
- Country: England
- Sovereign state: United Kingdom
- Post town: CHESTERFIELD
- Postcode district: S42
- Police: Derbyshire
- Fire: Derbyshire
- Ambulance: East Midlands

Wadshelf is a small village in Derbyshire, England. It is located between Chesterfield and Baslow, just outside the Peak District national park. It is near to Wigley, Holymoorside, and Brampton. The name is believed to be a corruption of Watch Hill. The village has a pub, The Highwayman on the main A619 road. Wadshelf is in the civil parish of Brampton.
