= Old Brampton =

Village in Derbyshire, England

Coordinates: 53.2432°N 1.4994°W

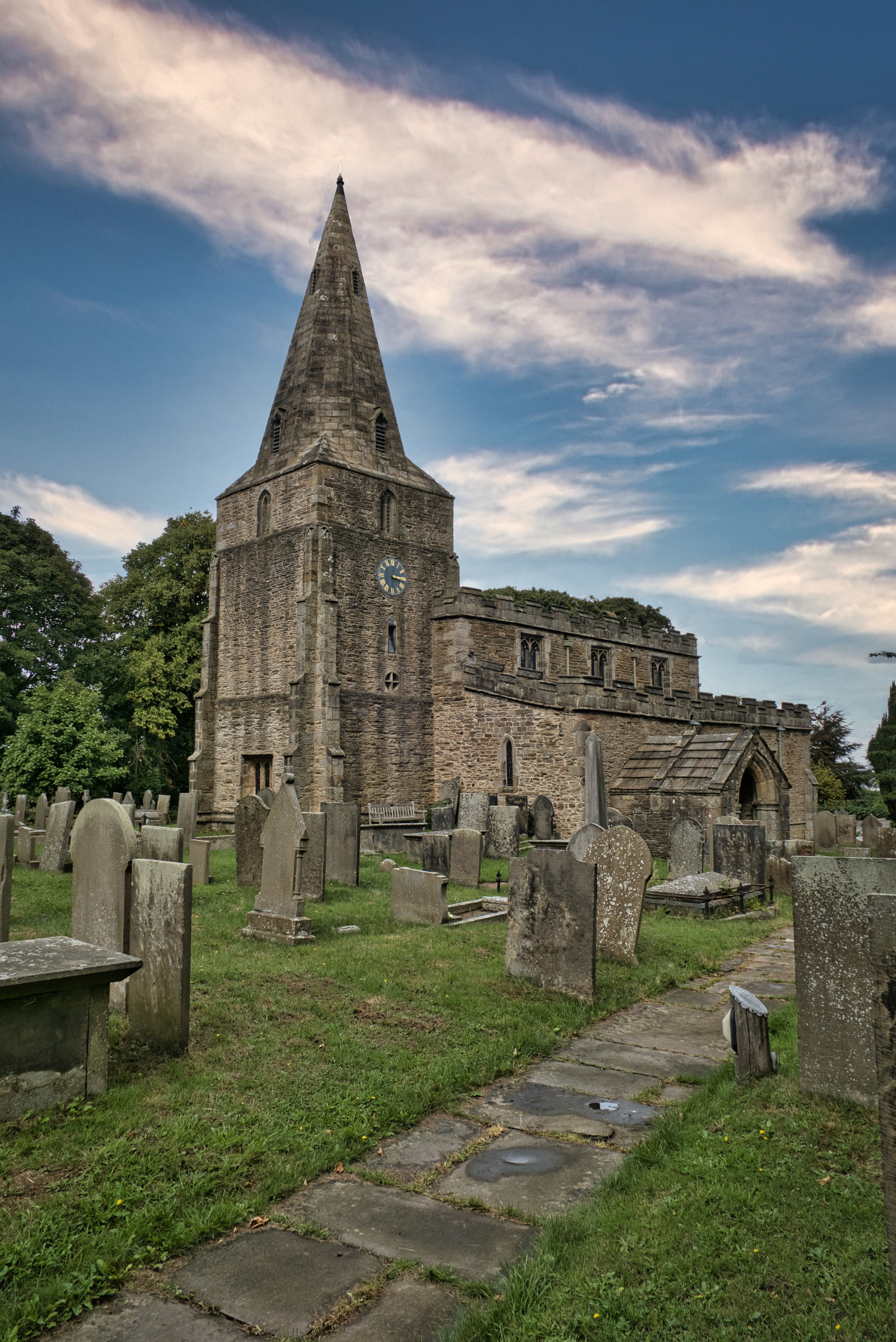
- Church of St Peter and St Paul

- Location within Derbyshire
- Population: 3,676 (Brampton and Walton ward 2011)
- OS grid reference: SK3371
- Civil parish: Brampton
- District: North East Derbyshire
- Shire county: Derbyshire
- Region: East Midlands
- Country: England
- Sovereign state: United Kingdom
- Post town: Chesterfield
- Postcode district: S40
- Dialling code: 01246
- Police: Derbyshire
- Fire: Derbyshire
- Ambulance: East Midlands

Old Brampton is a village in the civil parish of Brampton, in the county of Derbyshire, England. It lies 3 miles to the west of Chesterfield, on a spur of higher land between two small valleys. The North East Derbyshire ward is called Brampton and Walton. The population of this ward at the 2011 Census was 3,676. The Peak District National Park lies about 2 miles to the west.

== In Culture ==
Old Brampton is mentioned in the Domesday Book as one of the manors belonging to Walter D'Aincourt.
