= Fulham Refuge =

Women's prison in London, United Kingdom (1856–1888)

Coordinates: 51.47076°N 0.20906°W

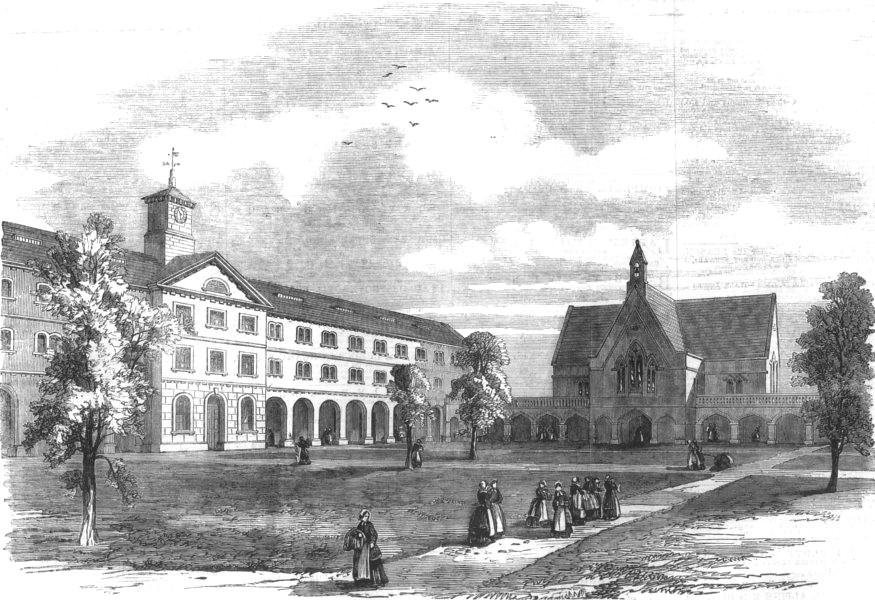
"The Refuge for female convicts at Fulham", The Illustrated London News, 1858.

Fulham Refuge, also known as Fulham Reformatory, was a women's prison in Fulham in west London that opened in 1856 and closed in 1888. The prison was intended to provide skills for prisoners to help rehabilitate them on their release back into the community.

== Site ==
The prison was located on land between Burlington Road and Fulham Road that had previously held a school (Burlington Academy), which closed in 1853, with the prison constructed on the site of the school's former cricket pitch. The prison included a large building, which consisted of workshops, schoolrooms, dormitories, a bakery and wash house; officers' accommodation, and an infirmary. There were exercise grounds, a chaplain's house, along with an orchard and grounds.

== Ethos ==
Fulham Refuge was initially used as part of a three-stage rehabilitation process championed by Sir Joshua Jebb, the Director General of Prisons, as women worked their way up from Millbank Prison, to Brixton Prison, before finally arriving at Fulham with a view to being reintegrated into the wider community.

Fulham was the "most distinctively feminine of the early convict prisons", and tried to train women with skills suitable for subsequent employment, cooking, cleaning and laundry, with emphasis on "softening and civilising".

Part of the reasoning behind calling it a "refuge" rather than "prison" was that potential employers might be less reluctant to employ such women and help them to transition back to respectability, especially as women were often judged more harshly than men; and that there was always rough work available for male former prisoners, but women were expected to be of "good character" for domestic service.

== Later years ==
Jebb's enlightened regime met with little success, and, after his death in 1863, the prison was expanded between 1870 and 1871 to hold about 400 women inmates and renamed Fulham Female Convict Prison. Numbers later fell and the prison closed in 1888, when the remaining inmates were transferred to HM Prison Woking. Burlington House was demolished in 1895, and the other buildings left empty until 1899 when they were sold for housing.
