= Listed buildings in Holymoorside and Walton =

Holymoorside and Walton is a civil parish in the North East Derbyshire district of Derbyshire, England. The parish contains 18 listed buildings that are recorded in the National Heritage List for England. All the listed buildings are designated at Grade II, the lowest of the three grades, which is applied to "buildings of national importance and special interest". The parish contains the villages of Holymoorside and Walton, and the surrounding countryside. Most of the listed buildings are houses and associated structures, farmhouses and farm buildings, and the others are a milepost and a war memorial.

== Buildings ==
Name and location	Photograph	Date	Notes
Outbuilding southwest of Hipper Hall; 53.22192°N 1.49246°W		Late 16th century	The outbuilding is timber framed and encased in sandstone, with some weatherboarding and a stone slate roof. There are two storeys and two bays, and the walls incorporate padstones. On the southwest gable end is an external stone staircase leading to an upper floor doorway. Inside, there is a single cruck truss.
Chander Hill Farmhouse and walls 53.22768°N 1.50422°W	—	Early 17th century	The farmhouse, which incorporates elements from an earlier house, is in sandstone with quoins, and a tile roof with coped gables and moulded kneelers. There are two storeys and attics, a main range of three bays, with a gabled cross-wing on the right, and a later service wing. The doorway has a massive lintel, the windows in the main range are casements with fake wedge lintels, and in the cross-wing are mullioned windows. The coped boundary walls are in sandstone, and incorporate a cellar window, and a doorway with massive jambs and lintel.
Hipper Hall; 53.22213°N 1.49209°W	—	Early 17th century	A house that has been altered, it is in sandstone with quoins, and a stone slate roof with coped gables and moulded kneelers. Thee is a double depth plan, with two parallel gabled ranges, and a projecting gabled wing at the rear. There are two storeys and attics, and three bays. The porch at the junction of the ranges has a coped gable and scrolled kneelers, the doorway has a shouldered surround, and above it is an oval window with voussoirs. Most of the other windows are mullioned, some with hood moulds. Inside, the roof is carried on upper cruck trusses.
Cherry Tree Farmhouse; 53.21937°N 1.45905°W	—	Mid 17th century	The farmhouse is in sandstone with gritstone dressings, quoins, and a roof of Welsh slate and stone slate with a coped gable at the rear. There are two storeys, a T-shaped plan, and a front range of two bays. The doorway has a chamfered quoined surround, a massive chamfered lintel, and a hood mould. Most of the windows are casements, and at the rear is a stair turret. In the centre of the house is a cruck truss.
Outbuilding southeast of Hipper Hall; 53.22186°N 1.49223°W	—	17th century	The outbuilding is in gritstone with quoins and a stone slate roof. There is a single storey with overlofts, four bays, a single storey rear wing at the west end, and two lean-tos. The building contains two doorways and the east bay is open. Inside, there are two cruck trusses.
Cruck barn, Old Barn Farm; 53.22711°N 1.49247°W		17th century	The barn is in sandstone with a stone slate roof, two storeys and three bays. In the centre of the north front is a wide doorway flanked by padstones for cruck trusses, and the south front contains doorways, in the east gable end is a taking-in door, and there are vents in all fronts. On the north side are pig cotes with a small yard in front of each enclosed by a low wall, and inside are two cruck trusses.
Spring House Farmhouse; 53.22142°N 1.47616°W	—	Mid 17th century	The farmhouse is in sandstone, and has a stone slate roof with a coped north gable. There are two storeys and an L-shaped plan, with a range of four bays, and a projecting gabled cross wing to the south. The doorway has a massive quoined surround and lintel, and most of the windows are mullioned.
Outbuilding, Spring House Farm; 53.22136°N 1.47647°W	—	17th century or earlier	The outbuilding is partly a cowhouse and partly a store, and is in sandstone and brick, with roofs of pantile, Welsh slate, and stone slate. There is a single storey with overlofts, six bays, and an outshut to the northwest. The building contains three doorways, and inside are four cruck trusses.
Loads House Farmhouse, outbuildings and walls 53.22416°N 1.52617°W		1713	The farmhouse, with attached outbuildings on both sides under a continuous roof, are in sandstone, with quoins, moulded cornices, and a stone slate roof. The house has two storeys, an L-shaped plan, and a front of three bays, with an added bay at the west end, and a cross-wing at the rear. It contains a central doorway with a quoined surround, a massive lintel, and a later canopy. To the west is an inserted doorway with a porch, and the windows are mullioned. Further to the west is a single-storey outbuilding with four bays, each bay containing a doorway with a quoined surround, and to the east of the house is a two-storey outbuilding. In front of the building is a low stone wall with saddleback copings and railings, low square gate piers with depressed pyramidal caps, and an iron gate.
Outbuilding east of Cairngorm; 53.22252°N 1.52712°W	—	1721	The outbuilding is in sandstone with a stone slate roof, a single story with overlofts, and three bays. In the centre is a doorway with a quoined surround with a massive lintel, over which is an inscribed and dated plaque. At the rear is a catslide roof over a lean-to, and in the east gable end is a taking-in door with a quoined surround and a massive lintel.
Broomhall Farmhouse; 53.23658°N 1.49059°W		Mid 18th century	The farmhouse is in red brick with sandstone dressings on a plinth, with chamfered quoins, a gutter cornice, and a slate roof with coped gables and kneelers. There are two storeys, attics and cellars, a main range with three bays, and a rear wing. Steps lead up to the central doorway that has a chamfered rusticated surround, a fanlight, and a cornice. Above the doorway is a sash window with an architrave and a keystone. The windows in the right bay are casements, in the left bay they are sashes, and the cellar windows have segmental heads.
Cart shed northeast of Broomhall Farmhouse; 53.23676°N 1.48975°W	—	Mid 18th century	The cart shed is in red brick with sandstone dressings, and has a tile roof with coped gables and kneelers. In the west gable end is a cart entrance with a quoined surround, a segmental arch, and a keystone.
Outbuilding west of Broomhall Farmhouse; 53.23658°N 1.49097°W	—	Mid 18th century	The outbuilding contains a barn, a cowhouse and a stable. It is in brick with sandstone dressings, and has a roof of stone slate and tile with coped gables and kneelers. There are two storeys and an L-shaped plan, with a main range and wing to the north. The building contains doorways with large lintels, windows with segmental heads, and a pitching hole. On the east gable end are external steps leading to an upper floor doorway.
Walton Lodge; 53.21503°N 1.47455°W		18th century	A house that was later extended, it is in stuccoed stone on a gritstone plinth, with a moulded eaves cornice, a parapet, and hipped slate roofs. There are two storeys, the main block has a symmetrical front of three bays, and the extension, lower to the west, has four bays. In the centre of the main block is a central shallow curved porch on four Tuscan columns, with a frieze, a cornice, an iron balustrade, and a doorway with a semicircular fanlight. The windows are sashes, some of which are tripartite.
Hawthorne Farmhouse; 53.22178°N 1.47668°W	—	Late 18th century	The house is in sandstone, with quoins, bands, and a roof of Welsh slate and stone slate with coped gables and moulded kneelers. There are two storeys and an L-shaped plan, with a symmetrical front range of five bays, and a later infill extension in the angle. The central doorway has a massive surround, and most of the windows are mullioned and contain casements.
High Lane Farmhouse; 53.20925°N 1.48407°W	—	Late 18th century	A house and outbuilding later combined into a house, it is in sandstone, partly rendered, with quoins and a stone slate roof. The front is stepped, the house part with two storeys and two bays, and the former outbuilding to the east with a single storey. In the centre of the house part is a doorway with a massive quoined surround and a deep lintel, the outbuilding has a doorway with a plain lintel, and the windows are mullioned.
Milepost; 53.23022°N 1.50055°W		Early 19th century (probable)	The milepost is in cast iron, and is cylindrical on a cylindrical steam, with a top domed in the centre. On the top it is inscribed with the distance to London, and on the sides are the distances to towns including Baslow, Bakewell, Buxton, and Chesterfield.
War memorial 53.22036°N 1.49380°W	—	1947	The war memorial is in sandstone and stands in a memorial garden. It consists of a tapering orthostat with rectangular panels cut into three sides. The panels contain inscriptions and the names of those lost in the two World Wars.
