= Robinson and Sons =

Packaging and healthcare company from Chesterfield

Robinson and Sons Ltd
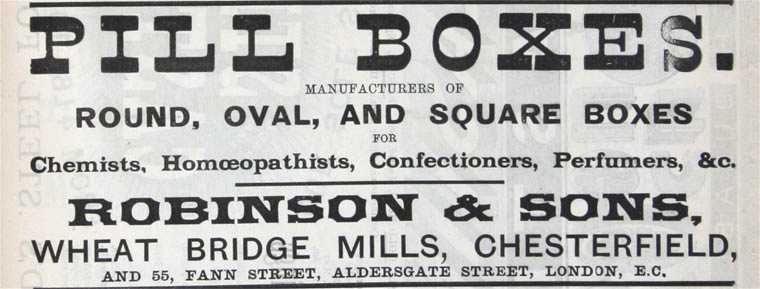
- 1884 Advert
- Industry: Packaging and Textiles
- Founded: 1839
- Founders: John Bradbury Robinson
- Successor: Robinson Packaging PLC; Robinson Healthcare Ltd
- Headquarters: Chesterfield, Great Britain
- Products: Boxes, cartons, sanitary towels, disposable nappies, cotton wool, plasters and surgical dressings

Robinson and Sons Ltd was founded in 1839 by John Bradbury Robinson in Chesterfield, Derbyshire. The company started making pill boxes and grew to become a major packaging and healthcare business.

== John Bradbury Robinson ==
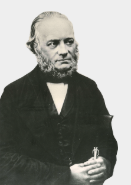
John Bradbury Robinson

John Bradbury Robinson (1802-1869) was the son of William Robinson and Ann Bradbury. The family pottery business had been running for 200 years. John B Robinson had been a retail chemist in Packer's Row, Chesterfield for 20 years when in 1839 he bought Fletcher's box manufacturing business at Middleton-by-Youlgreave. He transferred the production to Wheatbridge House in Brampton, on the edge of Chesterfield. The house had been built by John's grandfather William Robinson in 1770. During the 1840s, Robinson employed 25 people making square pill boxes from chipboard, round ointment boxes from willow and later on making turned wooden boxes. In the 1850s the business started to produce surgical dressings needed to treat the many wounded soldiers during the Crimean War. In the 1860s, the company developed medical cotton wool. John's two sons William Bradbury Robinson (1826-1911) and Charles Portland Robinson (1844-1916) joined the business as partners and the company became Robinson and Sons.

== Robinson and Sons Limited ==
During the 1880s, Robinsons acquired the patent from Dr Joseph Gamgee for the Gamgee tissue, using cotton wool between gauze layers, which was the basis for modern surgical dressings. Patents were also filed for the manufacture of the first sanitary towels in the 1880s. The decade also saw Robinsons working with Lord Joseph Lister to develop the first antiseptic dressings. In 1884, the Holme Brook Works was bought for production of pill boxes. In 1890, manufacture of folding boxes was introduced and in 1892 a printing department was opened. In 1893, the business was converted into a limited company, with William B Robinson as chairman. His brother Charles P Robinson and his son William B Robinson II were directors. The Walton Works were bought for dressings production in 1896. Charles P Robinson succeeded William as Chairman in 1911, followed by William B Robinson II in 1917. The Portland Works was built in 1921 near the Wheatbridge Mills to accommodate the expansion of the folding box department. In 1924, Charles W Robinson took over as chairman.

During the 1920s, Robinson and Sons made initiatives to address employee welfare. Philip Moffat Robinson led the establishment of the Wheatbridge Housing Association as a way for employees to access low-cost housing. A sports club, an amateur operatic and dramatic society and the company magazine The Link were all founded. In 1928, the company bought Field House (the former home of William B Robinson II) and converted it into a large canteen and social venue called Bradbury Hall (which operated until 1984).

By 1939, the company had a worksforce of 3,500 people. Colonel Victor O Robinson became chairman in 1945. A new bleach works for the Dressings Division was built at Whaley Bridge in 1950. By 1960, Robinsons employed 5,000 staff worldwide. By then Robinson and Sons' factories covered a large area by the River Hipper in Brampton. Robinson family members continued in the role of chairman with Ernest B Robinson in 1962, Charles P Robinson II in 1973, and Robert Robinson in 1978. In 1988, Tony Slipper (from Cadbury-Schweppes) became the first chairman from outside the Robinson family, with Philip Robinson as Chief Executive.

== Robinson Packaging ==
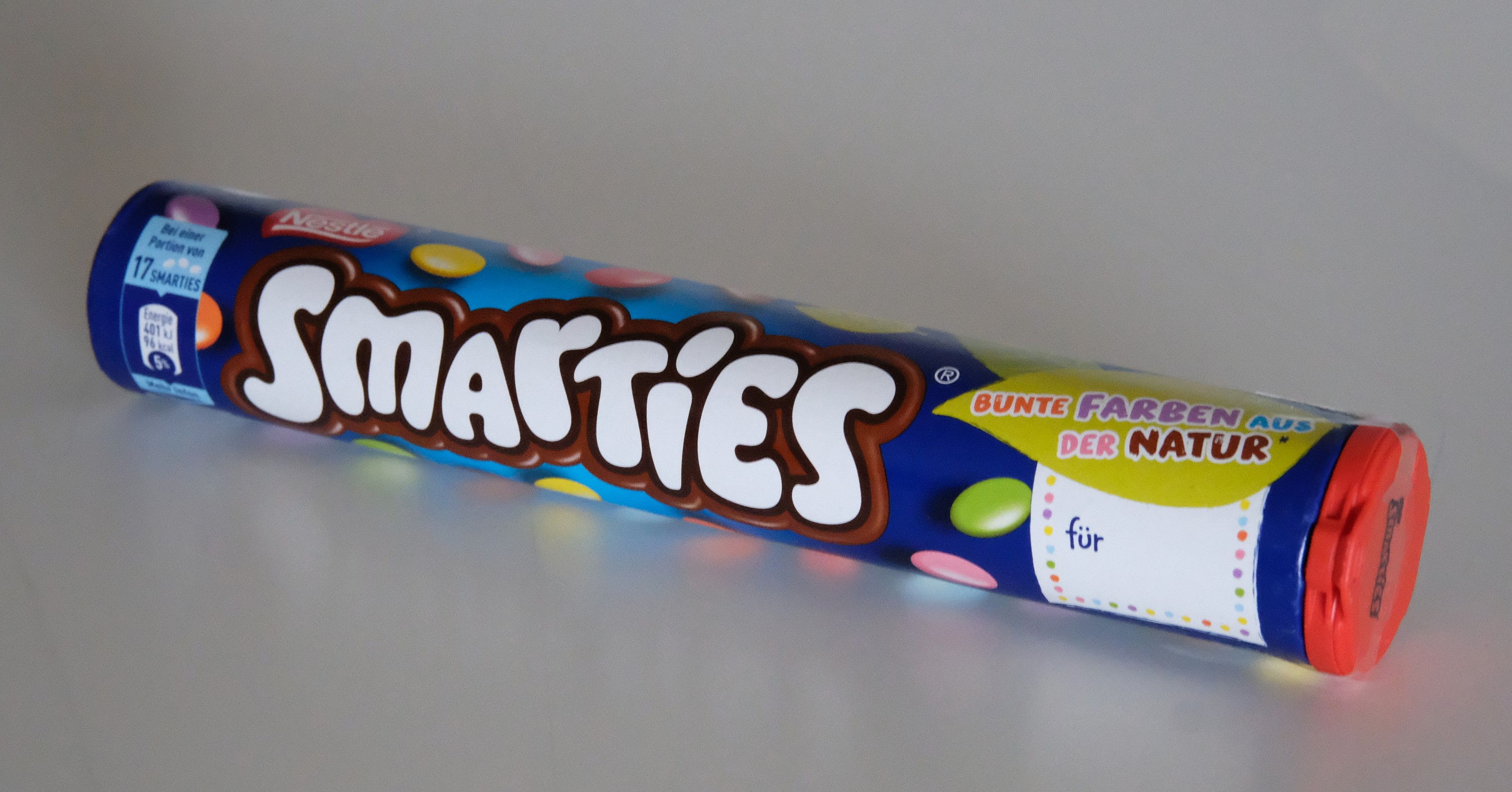
Smarties spiral tube

By 1954, one third of the carton business was producing over 43 million Quaker cereal boxes per year. In 1956, Robinsons began to produce the 'Smarties' tubes for Rowntree's. The construction was based upon the 'Little John Drum' spiral tube box invented by John Bradbury Robinson II in 1924. The Box Division was renamed the Packaging Division in 1965. It had a setback in 1969 when the National Health Service stopped using pill boxes and ointment boxes. In response, Robinsons bought I E White Ltd in 1974 to manufacture plastic containers in Kirkby-in-Ashfield as Robinson White Plastics Ltd. The Holme Brook Works closed in 1981. In 1988, a Gift Products department was established in Leeds.

Since 2005, the company has established sites in Poland with the purchase of a factory at Lodz and the acquisition of Madrox plastic packaging in Warsaw. The spiral wound box business based at Chesterfield was sold to Sonoco in 2011.

== Robinson Healthcare ==
From the late 1940s to the 1980s, the Dressings Division launched successful branded hygiene products including the 'Mene' sanitary towel, the 'Paddi' and 'Cosifits' disposable nappies and the 'Soft and Pure' range. The Dressings Division was renamed the Healthcare Division in 1987. Robinson Healthcare now specialises in single-use surgical instruments, first aid consumables and cotton wool products, from their manufacturing facility in Worksop, Nottinghamshire.
