= River Hipper =

Coordinates: 53°14′N 1°26′W

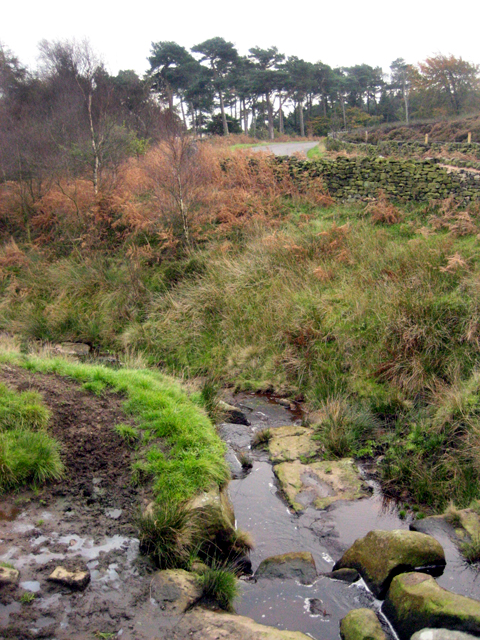
- At this point the Hipper comes off Beeley Moor and flows towards Holymoorside, becoming the river Hipper on the way

Location
- Country: England

Physical characteristics
- Source
  - location: Beeley Moor
- Mouth
  - location: River Rother

The River Hipper is a tributary of the River Rother in Derbyshire, England. Its source is a large expanse of wetlands, fed by the surrounding moors between Chatsworth and Chesterfield, known as the Hipper Sick on Beeley Moor, which is part of the Chatsworth Estate. It then passes through Holymoorside and down into Chesterfield, just south of the town centre, before flowing into the River Rother. In July 2007, parts of Chesterfield flooded when the River Hipper burst its banks during a substantial storm that caused extensive flooding in North Derbyshire and South Yorkshire. The river burst its banks again after torrential rain in October 2023. The surrounding landscape is known as the Hipper Valley.

== Course ==
The River Hipper rises as a small stream known as the Hipper Sick close to the 1,120-foot (340 m) contour on Beeley Moor or East Moor, just inside the Peak District National Park. As it flows eastwards, it is joined by a number of similar drains, flowing southwards across Brampton East Moor, and is crossed by Longside Road, where it leaves the park and enters some woodland. It turns to the south-east, and briefly defines the border of the park as it approaches Harewood Grange. It is crossed by Harewood Road, and is joined by two more streams, flowing north-east across Harewood Moor, the first unnamed and the second called Millstone Sick. It then resumes its easterly course through woodland known as Cat Hole, is crossed by Hungerhill Lane, flows over a weir adjacent to Hunger Hill Pumping Station and turns to the north-east to reach the eastern edge of the village of Holymoorside. It feeds the Old Mill Pond, and is joined by another stream, which rises a little further to the north-east than Hipper Sick near Upper Loads, and flows eastwards through Nether Loads to reach Holymoorside. The combined stream passes under Cotton Mill Hill, and heads towards Chesterfield.

As its gradient decreases, it meanders across open land and reaches the Chesterfield suburb of Walton. It is crossed by Somersall Lane, and is joined by another stream, which rises as a series of streams to the south of the village of Old Brampton and passes through Brookside to join the Hipper. It is now hemmed in on both sides by suburbs of Chesterfield, and supplies a large lake called Walton Dam. After it is crossed by the A632 Walton Road, it enters a culvert to pass under Bobbin Mill Lane and a superstore. It emerges into daylight again, to be crossed by Walton Fields Road, and then weaves between mill buildings. The buildings are grade II* listed and formed Walton Works. Many of them date from the late 18th century, and were part of a cotton wick mill. Of particular interest are two buildings which are early examples of fireproof construction, and are thought to be the only such examples of the technique still in existence. After the Factory Street bridge, there are three sections of culvert before the river is crossed by Boythorpe Road and is then culverted under part of Queens Park. Holme Brook flows along the northern edge of the park, having flowed south-eastwards from the Holmebrook Valley Park. Queens Park is a good example of a municipal park dating from the later Victorian period. It was designed by William Barron and Son, and its basic design has changed little since it opened in 1887. A restoration programme was completed in 2005, financed by the National Lottery Heritage Fund and formally opened by Prince Edward, Earl of Wessex.

After leaving the park, the Hipper is crossed by Park Road and a bridge which formerly carried a siding from Chesterfield railway station, but is now part of a cycle route. The final stretch is marked by bridges carrying the A617 dual carriageway, the A61 dual carriageway, and the Chesterfield to Derby railway, before the river enters the River Rother on its left hand bank.

== Milling ==
The Hipper has provided power to mills in the past. To the south of Holymoorside there were two mills, both known as Cathole Mill. The first was a corn mill, with a mill pond on the left bank of the river. It had ceased to exist by 1898. It was originally a smelting mill and red lead mill, associated with the lead mining industry in Derbyshire. It was mentioned in a deed dating from 1698, but probably ceased to be used for smelting around 1807. Thomas Hayes obtained a lease on it in 1812, and converted it into a corn mill. It continued to be used for this purpose until the 1880s, but the owner then built an extension to the house, and removed the water wheel and machinery. The site is now known as Corn Mill Cottages. Adjacent to the corn mill was a dyeing mill, with the mill pond on the right bank. It was disused by 1918. The mill was owned by Simon Manlove in 1839, and was used to produce sewing yarn, which was then dyed. He built 19 cottages for mill workers in 1844, and ceased to rely on water power after 1861, when he installed steam engines. He employed 120 people at the mill in 1870, when he built more housing, and a year later there were 209 workers. The mill closed in 1905.

A weir just below the dyeing mill fed a long feeder to the mill pond in Holymoorside. Holymoor Mills were on the downstream side of Cotton Mill Hill, and were still active in 1923, but the site had been redeveloped for housing by 1938. The mills were owned by Simeon Manlove in 1857, but had become part of English Sewing Cotton Ltd by 1904, although they still traded as S Manlove and Sons. Only the offices remain, which were converted into a house at some point. A weir in the river to the north of Walton fed Walton Dam, the largest mill pond on the river. It was common in the Sheffield area to use the word dam to describe the body of water created by an embankment, rather than the structure that created the body of water. Walton Dam was sufficiently big to have a boat house on it, and nearby was a small island. The corn mill, known as Walton Mill, was to the north of the dam, close to Walton Road. By 1922, it was marked as a cotton store. The first documents referring to a mill at this location date from 1351, when Robert Bretton owned a mill at the eastern end of Walton Dam, and another called Walton Nether Mill. A dam was built in the 18th century, to supply the corn mill for Walton Manor. The size of Walton Dam was increased around 1804, and the mill was acquired by Robinsons in 1899. They used the water for the production of cotton wool at Walton Works, and the pond was also used by their employees for leisure activities, including swimming. The dam and surrounding Somersall Park were donated to the Chesterfield Borough Council in 1930. The Hipper Valley Trail cycle route runs through the park, and the dam provides habitat for wildlife, including a large population of mandarin ducks who spend the winter months there.

To the east of Walton Road was another mill pond, shown as a bobbin mill in 1882, associated with Walton Saw Mills in 1898, and which had become Walton Bleach Works by 1922, when it was used for bleaching cotton. The mill pond was fed by the outflow from Walton Dam, and the associated buildings were known as the Bump Mill. From about 1745 it was used for smelting lead and producing red lead, but was leased to the Wilkinson family in 1781. In 1791, candle wicks started to be produced at the site by Hewitt & Co, although Wilkinson held the lease until 1811. Charles Taylor bought the mill in the 1850s and it became the Bobbin Mill, making bobbins for Simon Manlove's mill at Holymoorside, and possibly for others. By 1800, it was powered by a steam engine, but apart from the engine house and its chimney, most of the buildings were destroyed by a fire in mid-1800, which resulted in the death of a 15-year-old girl. A new "fireproof" structure, consisting of a cast iron frame supporting brick arches was erected in 1800/1801. Various firms appear to have operated the works, beginning with Bunting, Creswick, Longson and Claughton in 1806, Hewitt and Longson in 1811, Hewitt, Bunting, Longson & Claughton in 1813 and Hewitt and Bunting from 1857 until 1895. This last company were linen and cotton wick manufacturers, as well as cotton spinners, dealers and bleachers. The business boomed, as around 90 people were employed in 1841, but this had increased to 260 by 1851. In 1896, it was bought by Robinson and Sons, who used the buildings to manufactured sanitary towels and then maternity towels, as well as disposable nappies from the 1960s. However, the main output was always cotton wool, and continued to be so until 2002, when the business was sold and production moved to Carlton in Lindrick, near Worksop. The site was scheduled to be redeveloped as housing in 2007, but lay derelict for another ten years until planning permission for the Walton Mill development was granted in 2017. To the east of New Brampton Colliery, there were two mill ponds to the south of the river, but it is not clear if these were part of Walton Chemical Works. The final site was just before the modern A617 bridge, where a tannery and Hipper Works, which processed leather and glue were located on the north bank of the river.

== Water quality ==
The Environment Agency are responsible for measuring the water quality within each of the river systems in England. Each is given an overall ecological status, which may be one of five levels: high, good, moderate, poor and bad. There are several components that are used to determine this, including biological status, which looks at the quantity and varieties of invertebrates, angiosperms (flowering plants) and fish. Chemical status, which compares the concentrations of various chemicals against known safe concentrations, is rated as good or fail.

The water quality of the Hipper was as follows in 2019.

Section	Ecological Status	Chemical Status	Overall Status	Length	Catchment	Channel
Hipper from Source to River Rother	Moderate	Fail	Moderate	11.0 miles (17.7 km)	11.06 square miles (28.6 km^{2})	heavily modified

The river has not been classed as good quality because of physical modification of the channel, which is classed as heavily modified. Like many rivers in the UK, the chemical status changed from good to fail in 2019, due to the presence of polybrominated diphenyl ethers (PBDE), perfluorooctane sulphonate (PFOS), and mercury compounds, none of which had previously been included in the assessment.

A survey by the Wild Trout Trust in 2016 on behalf of Chesterfield Borough Council found that the Hipper where it runs through Somersall Park had been impounded by a number of weirs and that its channel had been straightened. The impoundements prevent geneflow between populations of fish in the different pools created while the straightening of the channel reduces the variety of habitats available to wildlife. In 2021, the Don Catchment Rivers Trust carried out a restoration project on this section. The initiative was funded by a grant from the Environment Agnecy's Fishery Improvement Program, which seeks to invest money raised from rod licences in improving habitat for fish. Derbyshire Council, Chesterfield Council and the Wild Trout Trust also gave advice on the project, which saw the introduction of woody debris into the channel, to create bends, pools and riffles. The debris also provides some protection for fish against predators, and helps to prevent them from being washed downstream during flood events.

== Bibliography ==
- Gaskell, Paul (17 May 2016). "River Hipper: Advisory Visit" (PDF). Wild Trout Trust. Archived (PDF) from the original on 20 August 2021.
- Robinson, Richard (May 2007). "The History and Future of Walton Bump Mill" (PDF). Newsletter No 26. North East Derbyshire Industrial Archaeology Society. Archived (PDF) from the original on 21 May 2016.
