= Holymoorside =

Village in Derbyshire, England

Coordinates: 53.21°N 1.49°W

- The 2006 Well Dressing in Holymoorside

- Location within Derbyshire
- Area: 0.6125 km^{2} (0.2365 sq mi)
- Population: 1,419 (2020 estimate)
  - Density: 2,317/km^{2} (6,000/sq mi)
- Civil parish: Holymoorside and Walton
- District: North East Derbyshire
- Shire county: Derbyshire
- Region: East Midlands
- Country: England
- Sovereign state: United Kingdom
- Post town: CHESTERFIELD
- Postcode district: S42
- Dialling code: 01246
- Police: Derbyshire
- Fire: Derbyshire
- Ambulance: East Midlands
- UK Parliament: North East Derbyshire

Holymoorside is a village in the civil parish of Holymoorside and Walton, in the North East Derbyshire district, in the county of Derbyshire, England, approximately two miles west of Chesterfield. It is located at 53.21 North, -1.49 West. Close to the boundary of the Peak District National Park, Chatsworth House lies seven miles to the west of the village. In 2020 it had an estimated population of 1,419.

== History ==
Holymoorside once hosted four public houses but only two remain: The Lamb Inn and The Bull's Head. The Lamb Inn was part of a butcher's business dating back to 1851, with the present design of the pub dating from 1953 when the shop moved to new premises on New Road. The Bull's Head has roots dating back to 1881. There was once a chip shop next to the Lamb Inn, but this burnt down on a bank holiday Monday in 1935.

The Old Star, an additional pub on Loads Road but now a private residence dating back to 1820, was notorious for the suicide, by cutting the throat, of a landlord in 1886. Its owners, Chesterfield Borough Council, sold the pub at auction in April 1921, when Mrs H. Dickens secured the sale with a bid of £1500. The Old Star closed in 1959 with a local newspaper report at the time stating that it had been licensed for 300 years.

The Woodman's Arms was an alehouse, which only sold beer and not spirits or wines. As the name suggests, the landlord's main occupation was a woodcutter and timber merchant. The earliest mention of the premises in the local trade directories was in 1862. Now a private residence, the building still stands as Sycamore House, on Loads Road near the Lamb Inn.

The village has two churches, reflecting the religious history of the "Holy Moor". There had been three until the Methodist Chapel on New Road closed. Holymoorside Country Store, run by the Kendall family is the only surviving shop in the village. The oldest building in the village is Hipper Hall, an early 17th-century farmhouse with an even older tithe barn which has fallen in to a state of disrepair. However Harewood Grange and Chander Hill Farm date back as far as 1207.

The Manloves were proprietors of the cotton thread mill which was built towards the end of the 18th century. This mill employed many of the women and girls of the village, whilst the men and boys worked in the tin mine. The mill buildings, which were three storeys high and were acquired by the Manlove Brothers around 1840, were prosperous for about 50 years, employing 200 people at its peak, but closed in 1902 and now hardly a trace remains of their existence. After 1902 the site was demolished, and in 1930 a row of houses called Riverside Crescent replaced the mill.

The area now known as "Billy Pig's Tree", off Dennis's Lane in the Cathole Valley was named following a murder-suicide on the adjacent moorland in the 1870s.

To combat the risk of droughts affecting the water supply to the village and mills at Walton, Hunger Hill Pumping Station was constructed by the Chesterfield Corporation in 1924. The building is located by the River Hipper near Hunger Hill Lane and has been derelict ever since the site ceased to operate in the 1970s. A borehole 440 feet deep is still overflowing under natural water pressure inside. In addition to Hunger Hill, another, larger pumping station was constructed at the same time near Chander Hill, called Whispering Well. This has since been converted into apartments.

In the 1940s, a reservoir was proposed in Clank Wood at Chander Hill, with geological maps indicating a large number of boreholes had been sunk. However, this plan never came to fruition.

Belmont House was a large private residence just off Chatsworth Road. It was built in the 18th century and had a large tower and flying buttresses. The tower was rumoured to be haunted and local legend has it that a cannon was fired from the top of the tower towards Gladwin's Mark a few miles south. Belmont was demolished in the early 2000s and new apartments have been built on the site.

A significant electricity pylon line once ran from Hallcliffe and Chander Hill through the village and supplied the Coking Plant in Chesterfield. All but one of the pylons were felled in the 1990s, the remaining one is nestled in a valley near Birkinshaw Wood.

Holymoorside Primary School moved to its present site in the Doghole hamlet area of Holymoor Road in June 2002.

== Customs ==
The traditional Derbyshire custom of well dressing is maintained in Holymoorside. The Well Dressing is on display in late August. As well as well dressing, nativity scenes are also displayed in the shelter on Cotton Mill Hill around Christmas.

"Holymoorside and Walton Arts Festival Society" arrange events throughout the year, including the scarecrow making event in August each year which involves the whole village. The local scout group also holds community events such as the Christmas Fair and 10K run in May.

On the fourth Saturday in June, Holymoorside Primary School hosts its annual summer fair, followed by the charity duck race near the Village Hall later in the afternoon. A summer gala also used to take place at the Village Hall recreation ground, but this had stopped by the early 2010s.

== Governance ==
Since 2009, the local Derbyshire County Council representative has been Mr Stuart Ellis who is a member of the Conservative Party. Local amenities are provided by Holymoorside and Walton Parish Council, under the district council of North East Derbyshire.

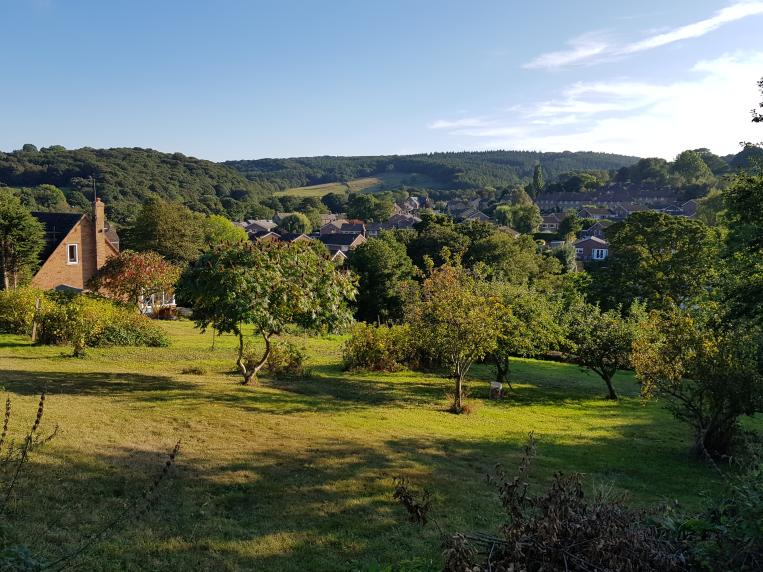
View south over central Holymoorside from the bottom of Windy Fields on 26 September 2021

The district councillors are Martin Thacker MBE JP and Peter Elliot.

Lee Rowley has been the Conservative MP for North East Derbyshire since 2017.

== School ==
There has been a school in Holymoorside since 12 February 1872, which was constructed and funded by the mill-owning "Manlove" family. The school was situated on New Road before moving to its current location in the Doghole hamlet area of Holymoor Road in June 2002. The old school buildings have been converted into apartments. The original school bell hangs from the wall in the current school's reception area.

The school site was previously an orchard, which had been compulsorily purchased by the council in 1931. Proposals to construct an Approved school in the 1950s were not followed through and the site continued use as an orchard full of apple trees and several greenhouses used to grow fruit and vegetables for a local market stall. Construction began in 1999.

The Headteacher of the school is Mr Ian Holmes, who has been in post since 2021. The school features twelve classrooms, a music room, library and a large hall used for assemblies, dining and PE. There is also a 26 place nursery. The grounds of the school include a turning circle, playgrounds with climbing frames, a large field for sports, and a pond and a wood to the north of the site used for Forest School activities.

The school was rated 'Good' by Ofsted in 2018.

== Local folklore and supernatural activity ==
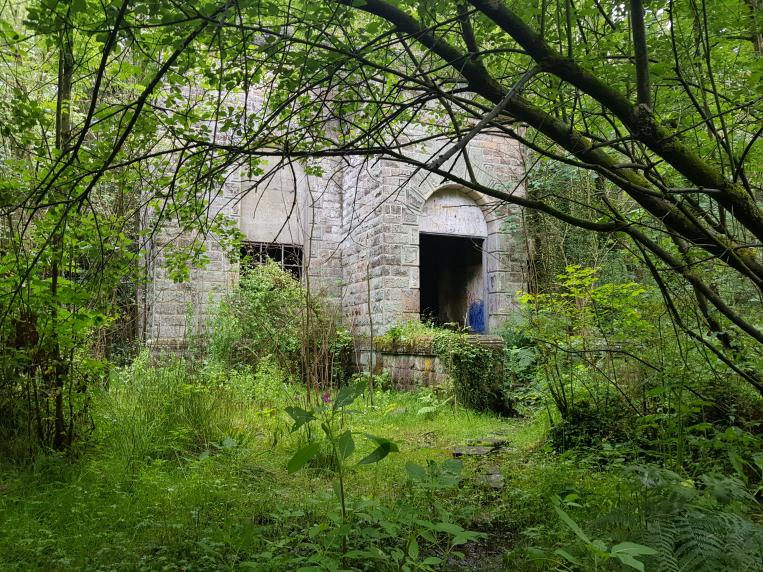
The abandoned Hunger Hill Pumping Station on 8 August 2021

The village lies on the eastern edge of Beeley Moor, which has many tales associated with it, including a lost traveller who can be heard moaning on the first full moon in March. In addition, there is a large beast-like animal that has been known to dart in front of cars on the moors.

There are several tales of the supernatural throughout the village. An area of the River Hipper, situated near the primary school, is called Little Blackpool and is reputedly haunted by a hooded figure. The ghost of young lady and her dalmatian were seen in a nearby field, disappearing behind a hawthorn bush in the 1980s. The lady had been shot dead the previous day. The figure of Mary Queen of Scots has been seen at Hipper Hall. Canons from Beauchief Abbey have been sighted walking along Chander Hill Lane and near Harewood Grange, where there was a monastery farm.

A now ruined farmstead in the Cathole Valley is home to a legend of a mother and her sons sheltering in a nearby cavern, where they would house stolen horses that were brought across Harewood Moor. Local author CA Gedge wrote a book titled "The Reluctant Rebel", inspired by the legend.

Walton Holymoorside Primary School is haunted by lights turning themselves on in the evenings when the school is locked up, along with loud banging noises and footsteps in an alleyway when no one is on the site.

== See also ==
- Listed buildings in Holymoorside and Walton
