= Holymoorside and Walton =

Civil parish in Derbyshire, England

Coordinates: 53.217°N 1.498°W

- Civil parish
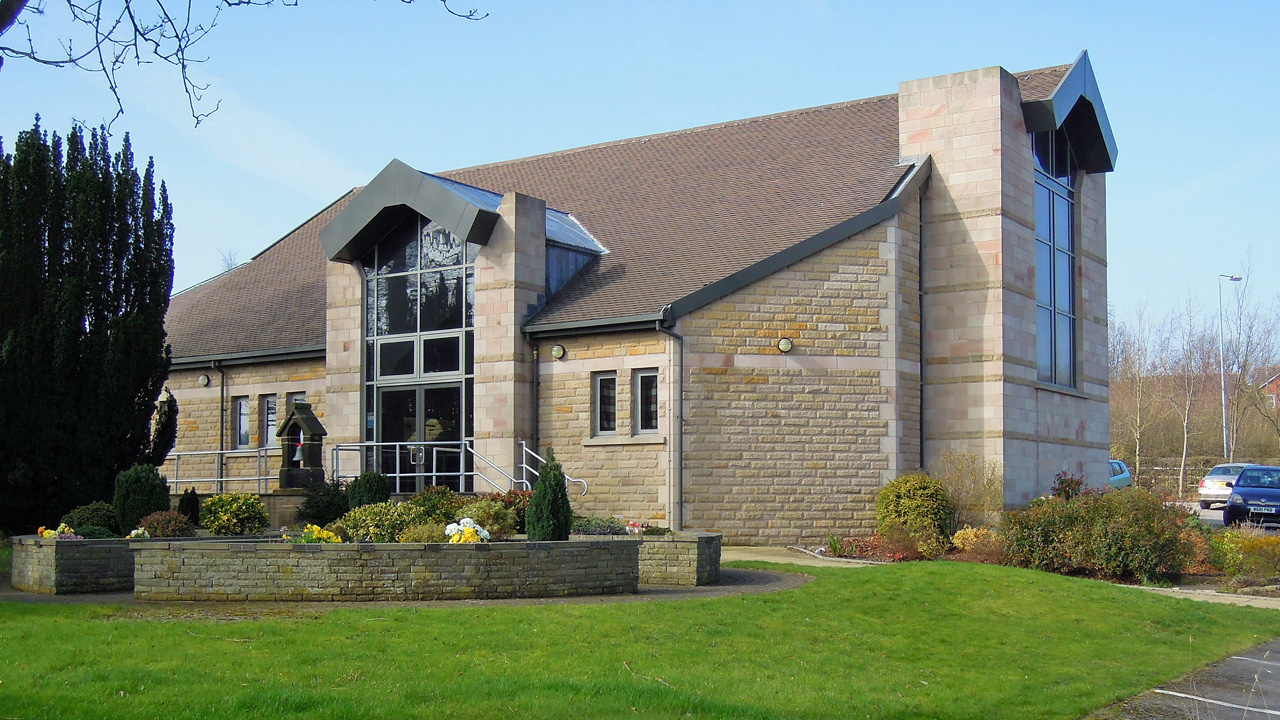
- St John's Church, Walton

- Location within Derbyshire
- Interactive map of Holymoorside and Walton
- Area: 5.73 sq mi (14.8 km^{2})
- Population: 2,138 (2021)
  - Density: 373/sq mi (144/km^{2})
- OS grid reference: SK337692
  - London: 130 mi (210 km) SE
- District: North East Derbyshire
- Shire county: Derbyshire
- Region: East Midlands
- Country: England
- Sovereign state: United Kingdom
- Settlements: Holymoorside: Walton; Chanderhill; Nether Loads; Slatepit; Upper Loads
- Post town: CHESTERFIELD
- Postcode district: S42
- Dialling code: 01246
- Police: Derbyshire
- Fire: Derbyshire
- Ambulance: East Midlands
- UK Parliament: North East Derbyshire
- Website: holymoorsideandwaltonparishcouncil.co.uk

Holymoorside and Walton is a civil parish within the North East Derbyshire district, which is in the county of Derbyshire, England. Named for its main settlements, with a mix of a number of villages and hamlets amongst a large rural area, it had a population of 2,138 residents in 2021. The parish is 130 miles (210 km) north west of London, 20 miles (32 km) north of the county city of Derby, and 2 miles (3.2 km) south west of the nearest market town of Chesterfield. It is adjacent with the Peak District national park to the west, and shares a border with the district of Chesterfield, along with the parishes of Ashover, Beeley, Brampton as well as Wingerworth. The parish paradoxically does not include the majority of the nearby built-up suburb of Walton, Chesterfield which is now within an adjacent unparished area of the borough.

== Geography ==
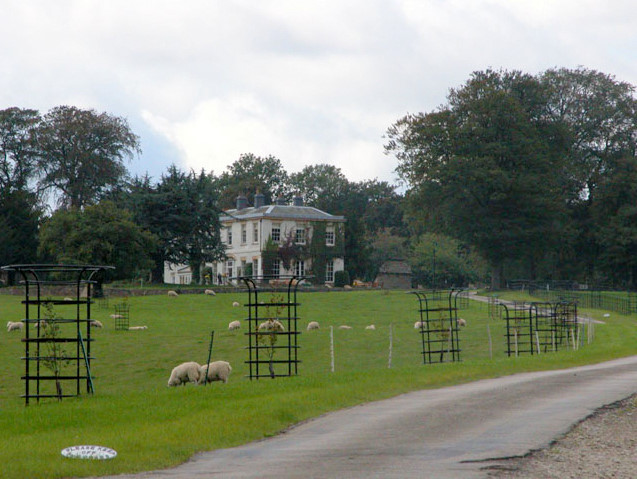
Walton Lodge

=== Location ===
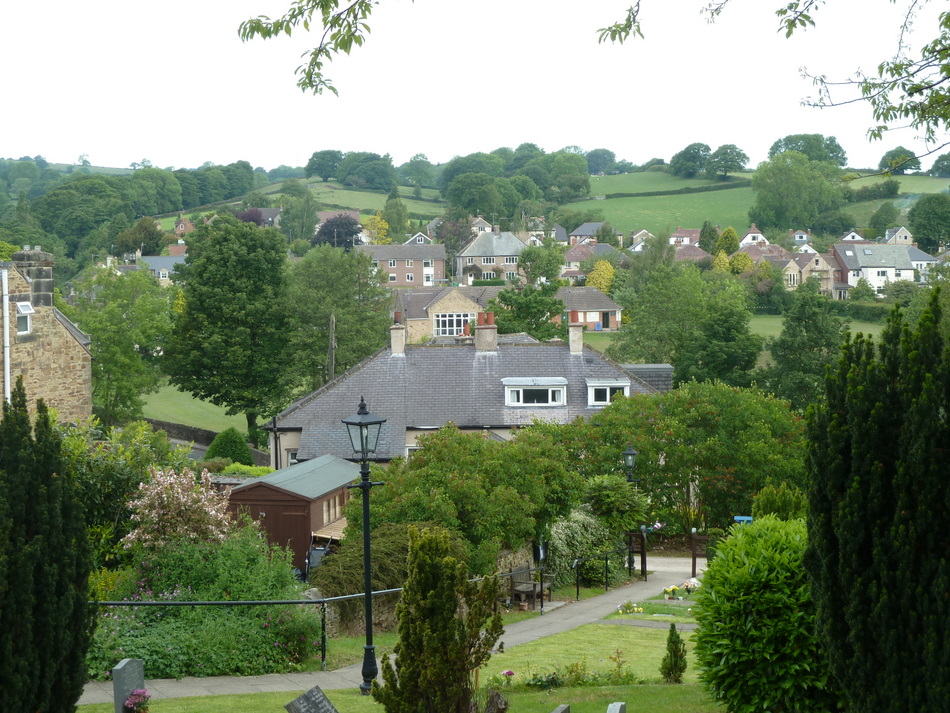
Holymoorside - view from churchyard

Holymoorside and Walton is surrounded by the following local locations:

- Chesterfield, Old Brampton and Wadshelf to the north
- Alicehead, Harper Hill, Spitewinter and Uppertown to the south
- Chesterfield and Wingerworth to the east
- Beeley Moor, Brampton East Moor and Chatsworth to the west.

It is 5.73 square miles (14.8 km^{2}; 1,480 ha) in area, 2.8 miles (4.5 km) in height and 4.1 miles (6.6 km) in width, spanning across all the western edge of the North East Derbyshire district, fitting between Chesterfield and the Derbyshire Dales districts. The parish lies in the west of the district and central portion of Derbyshire county. The parish is roughly bounded by land features such as an unnamed tributary of the River Hipper to the north, Hipper Sick brook and Syda Lane to the west, Birdholme Brook to the east, and the A632, B5057 roads and River Hipper to the south.

==== Settlements and routes ====
There are two main villages within the parish:

- Holymoorside is the largest, and central to the area
- Walton is along the A632 road, 1 1/3 miles (2.1 km) east of Holymoorside. Walton extends as a suburb into the neighbouring Chesterfield borough and town, only a small portion centred around the Acorn Ridge road and the church is within the parish.

There are also a number of hamlets throughout, some of which are little more than a cluster of houses or farms:

- Chanderhill is to the north of the parish
- Nether Loads is to the west
- Slatepit Dale in the south
- Upper Loads to the far west

Outside of these settlements, the parish is predominantly an agricultural and rural area.

The key route through the parish is the A619 road from Chesterfield through to Baslow, for access to the Peak District, running through the northern portion of the area. The A632, also from Chesterfield, runs through the south to Matlock.

=== Environment ===
==== Landscape ====
Primarily farming and pasture land throughout the parish outside the populated areas, there is some substantial forestry throughout, mainly the collective of coppices and woods south and east of Holymooorside village, and Walton Wood south of Walton. Hagg Wood is to the north of the parish, above Nether and Upper Loads. The south western corner of the parish is cultivated moorland, and is part of the wider Northeast Derbyshire Moors, this section comprises the Holy Moor and the Longside Moor, the perimeter of both forms the outer boundary of the Peak District. The parish, because of these features is at times referred to as the 'Gateway to the Peak', and contains some of the highest quality landscapes outside of the Peak District. It was seriously considered for inclusion within the National Park boundary while it was being conceived in the 1950s.

==== Geology ====
Being adjacent to the Peak District National Park, the composition of the parish is broadly similar, with clay, coal, ironstone, lead, limestone, and gritstone featuring in the geology of the wider area. It rises through mudstones, sandstones and siltstone, making up the Pennine Lower Coal Measures Group formed between 319 and 318 million years ago during the Carboniferous period.

==== Water features ====
Traversing the centre of the parish is the River Hipper, flowing close to Holymoorside, with parts and tributaries forming some of the parish boundary. At the village, the Loads Brook feeds the Hipper from its source near Upper Loads. The Hallcliffe brook in turn drains into the Loads, with a small pond and reservoir upstream near its source. The valley of the Hipper south of Holymoorside is known as Cat Hole. The Birdholme Brook delineates the south-eastern and south parish border near Walton.

==== Land elevation ====
The parish rises from the east towards the west, the lowest section being the point the Birdholme Brook flows out the parish by Langer Lane, at ~91 metres (299 ft), while Walton village also to the east is in the range of 135–145 metres (443–476 ft). The area around Holymoorside varies from 125–175 metres (410–574 ft), with the parish peak by the Peak District edge in the west at 335 metres (1,099 ft).

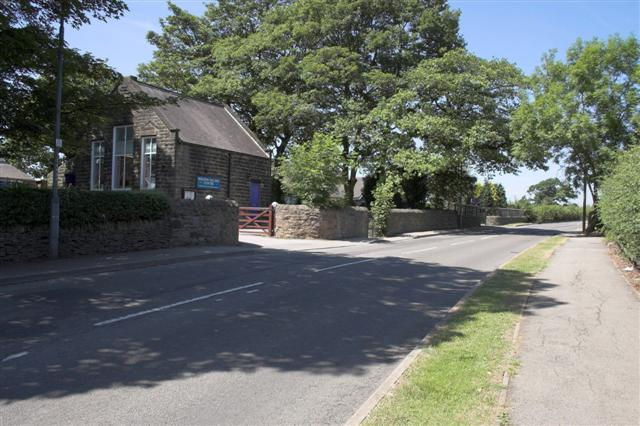
Walton Village Centre, Walton Back Lane

== History ==
=== Toponymy ===
The only settlement reported at the time of the Domesday Book survey in 1086 was Walton, which was derived from the ''farm of the Welshmen or serfs', and was then known as Waletune.

Holymoorside was first recorded in 1756, and is certainly derived from the nearby Holy Moor with it situated alongside, although how the moor itself was named is less clear. One suggestion is the land at nearby Harewood Grange within Ashover being farmed until 1537 during the Dissolution of the Monasteries by canons from Beauchief Abbey with the moor becoming 'Howley More' in the late 1500s, and eventually ‘Holy Moor’; another is it was named from Howley Corn Mill which was first recorded in late 16th century public records as ‘Holley Milne’ and later in the 17th as 'Holley More'; or through early Scandinavian settlers and the ‘Holy’ from Hangr or hoh leah (hill clearing) to which mor was added, of which there is a local hill spur.

=== Local area ===
==== Early history ====
Evidence of prehistoric remains have been discovered scattered throughout the parish, with finds skewed to the west. These date local occupation from 4000BC onwards, with artefacts including rock carvings and flint tools. Later monuments include barrows such at Longside Moor which shows human activity in the Bronze Age from 2350BC. Cairnfields are recorded in the vicinity, demonstrating an early field system in use also around this time, along with funerary uses. Coins of later origin during the time of Roman Britain occupation (43AD to 405AD) were also found locally. Both Holymoorside and Walton lay in what was the Scarsdale hundred, which was one of the six ancient divisions of the county, dating back from medieval times until 1894.

==== Holymoorside and environs ====
The Holymoorside area was a part of Brampton with Wadshelf in 1086 AD at the time of Domesday, which was shared between the Derbyshire tenants-in-chief Ascoit (or Hascoit) Musard and Walter D'Aincourt. Later, the consolidated Musard manor of Brampton was granted by Henry II to Peter de Brampton, who is believed to have been the second son of Matilda de Cauz, or Caus, who became heiress of the Barony of Caus, through Adam de Birkin, her second husband. Descendants of Peter then took on the name of De Caus, however the male line became extinct around 1460. The manor of Brampton, then known as Caus-hall, became by eventual purchase, the property of the Earls of Shrewsbury, and later on to the Earl of Newcastle. Having passed with other estates to the Duke of Portland, it was included in an exchange with the Duke of Devonshire. Starting in around 1955, some local landholdings of the Chatsworth estate were sold after the death of the 10th Duke in lieu of death duties, but other nearby assets kept. The D'Aincourt manor was passed with Sutton to the Leakes, and then purchased in the late 16th century by the Clarkes of Somersall Hall. Much of the focus during medieval times was not in Holymoorside as it had not been established, with the scattered population in the south of Brampton then based around Doghole (Holymoor Road), Pocknedge and the Loads settlements, which were all recorded as settled areas by the 15th century.

Early industry included possible lead or iron smelting at Bole Hill and charcoal burning pits both in the Hallcliffe brook valley north of the Loads villages, but the area was particularly notable for a number of mills from the early 16th century, the first recorded for refining corn and eventually in the 17th owned by the Clarke family of Somersall Hall. In the 1580s a lead-smelting mill was begun near this site, and this possibly grew to as many as four in 1659. By 1671 there were at then 'Howley Moore', as well as a water corn mill, two 'smilting mills for the meltinge of leade oare and makeinge of leade', implying there was less lead being supplied. It seems this activity ceased by 1745, the mills reverting to grinding corn or shutting down after local lead supplies had run out, such as Cornmill Mills to the very south of the village, converting to corn milling in the early 1800s. The Cundy family for many years ran the main local milling operation as tenants, finally buying it when the Clarke estate was sold in 1824. Other industry in the area included colour dye works at Cathole to the south of the village, brick works mills at Loads and cotton mills established in 1780, and by 1790 Richard Arkwright held an interest. The cotton mills were owned by Simeon Manlove in the early 1800s next to the River Hipper, which employed over 200 workers at its height. Manlove was a generous local benefactor, who built homes for workers, a church, school and gave land for a recreation ground. The milling operation was sold in 1897 to the English Sewing Cotton Co and the offices later converted into a private residence after the mills closed in 1905.

Hipper Hall was built in the late 16th century, thought to have an association to the Foljambes when they held Walton as their main seat, with some members of the family possibly residing here as Walton Hall appeared to be rundown by this time, later reports in the middle 17th century stating it was 'utterly ruyned, plucked downe, and sould, no materiall, as reported left', although the link to the Foljames and the hall is yet to be fully proven. This possible relocation of the seat, together with the business activities appeared to help in establishing Holymoorside as a settlement by the middle 1700s. Belmont was an 18th-century home on Holymoor Road, also known as Gladwin's Folly because it had a notable tower, local folklore was that General Henry Gladwin fired a cannon from it towards Gladwin's Mark in Ashover. His son Charles Dakeyne Gladwin later let out his parental home Stubbing Court in Ashover, and moved into Belmont. The industrialist Manlove family at one point owned the house, it was used as a children's home in the 1950s before being pulled down in the 21st century and apartments built in its place. Holymoorside School was established in 1874 for 200 children. As the population grew in the 1800s, non-conformist churches sprang up to cater to the area, with a Primitive Methodist Chapel built in 1831, and a Wesleyan Chapel in 1832. 1862 saw the build of a Congregational Church mainly sponsored by the cotton mill owner Simeon Manlove. A new Church of England parish encompassing New Brampton, the southern portion of Brampton parish and Walton was created with the centre at St Thomas's at New Brampton in 1832. A church of ease, St Peter's was built in Holymoorside village in 1841.

==== Walton ====
The Domesday survey reported Walton as in the ownership of King William with no then recorded population, possibly being considered wasteland. By the 12th century, it was the property of the ancient family of Breton (or Brito), Robert de Breton being the first lord of the manor, and their seat based at Walton Hall along the present Foljambe Avenue, this very first hall possibly built in the time of Henry I. Either Breton or his descendants created a deer park which lay between the Matlock road and the River Hipper, which the current Park Hall may have been a part of, but which dates from the 17th century. They also built a chapel for private use, with a request made to church authorities for this recorded in the 13th century. Around 1388 the estate began to be passed in parts, hereditarily descended by Sir John de Loudham (of Lowdham) to Godfrey Foljambe. A replacement hall on the same site was a courtyard house dating from the early 15th century, and notably Mary, Queen of Scots was briefly held here in 1569 by English authorities as part of protective custody after her defeat at the Battle of Langside. By this time the Hall was a sprawling house, containing 72 rooms and was the largest gentry house in the parish of Chesterfield. The Foljambes eventually owned the whole of the estate, and in 1633, Sir Frances Foljambe finally sold these holdings to Sir Arthur Ingram. It appears the hall was rundown by this time, and Hipper Hall in Holymoorside may have been a replacement seat for the Foljambes and had been built in the late 1500s. By 1648 it was reported Walton Hall was virtually ruined, and a farmhouse was later built on the site, which later was the basis for the current hall which was built in 1788 by the then owners, the Woodyeare family.

Walton was a township in the wider ancient Chesterfield parish, it was in medieval times more extensive than now; the boundary being only a mile away from Chesterfield centre, terminating by what is now West Bars, extending southeast to Boythorpe and Birdholme, while to the south west following the River Hipper to the edge of Harewood Moor which was farmed by canons from Beauchief Abbey. Walton too had a grange belonging to an order of canons from the Gilbertine Order at Sempringham in the 14th century, around Farm Close within what is now the suburb. A farm, Grangewood was later recorded on the site by the 19th century, possibly reusing buildings before being demolished in the early 1970s and a modern housing estate of the same name built on top. Walton Lodge is a large country house dating from the 18th century south of the village, and is amongst an extensive and well-wooded park, it was a seat and property of Sir Joshua Jebb in 1842. The Walton side of the Hipper had considerably less industry around Holymoorside (bar the aforementioned cotton mills) or at New Brampton, but still included the Walton Mills operation, milling corn in the 18th century, some small-scale coal mining east of Walton Hall at Whitecotes Colliery from the early 1900s to 1958, along with iron deposits by Birdholme Brook, coal deposits at Slatepit Dale and bleach works during the 19th century

In 1803 Walton was enclosed. By 1812 the estate was offered for sale, and among the items described in the sale catalogue were: Holymoorside Cotton Mill, the dam and adjacent fields. It is reported that the greater part of the estate was purchased by Sir Thomas Hunloke, of Wingerworth, and that he later resold the hall and surrounding land in 1821 to the Reverend Richard Turbutt, of Ogston Hall. Hunloke's estate sold off the remaining land at auction in 1920, this was developed into the present day Walton suburb. Walton Infant School was erected in 1896 to cater for 60 children. The chapel built in earlier medieval times was in ruins by the 19th century, with little remaining. Until this, Walton did not have its own place of worship and as a township, its parent house of religion was at Chesterfield. St Thomas's, serving Holymoorside, Walton and New Brampton was formed in 1832. Walton was separated out as a parish in 1837. Two cottages at the corner of Walton Back Lane and the Chesterfield – Matlock turnpike were converted to form a new ‘daughter’ Mission Church within the parish, opening in 1889, until 1918 when a new church, St John's was opened on the opposite corner of Walton Back Lane. The original ‘Cottage Church’ was eventually demolished for road widening in 1938. The early 1980s saw growth in Walton with new housing which meant the church was no longer big enough, a new build was commissioned and opened by the then Bishop of Derby in 1992.

==== Local government reforms and later ====
1894 was the beginning of a loss of territory administratively, much of New Brampton and the Birdholme and Boythorpe parts of Walton were absorbed into Chesterfield parish and borough, with further land transfers in 1910 and 1920, to provide land for housing. In 1935, the southern area of Brampton parish comprising Chanderhill, the Loads settlements, Holymoorside and Holy Moor was transferred to Walton. Walton parish was in 1988 renamed to the present day Holymoorside and Walton. Nine inscribed boundary stones were erected in 2000 to mark the Millennium, the first of which is found at the Holymoorside Village Hall car park.

== Governance and demography ==
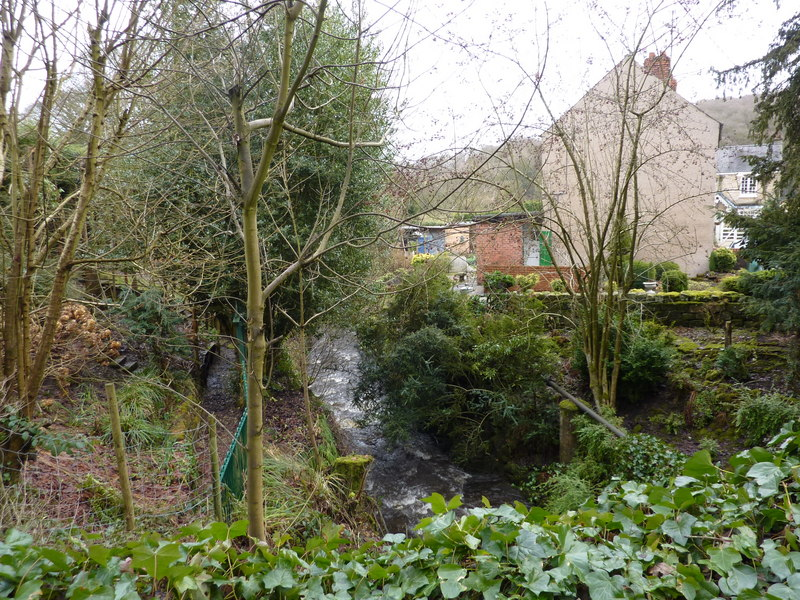
River Hipper, Holymoorside

=== Population ===
There are 2,138 residents recorded within the parish for the 2021 census, a reduction (5%) from the 2,233 residents recorded within the parish for the 2011 census, which itself was an increase of 59 (3%) from the 2001 census, and at 1.5 persons per hectare the population density is much lower than the district (3.6) and national averages (4.1). Reflecting the trend nationally however, it has an ageing population, the ratio of young people in the parish is below the averages both in the district as well as countrywide.

=== Housing ===
The built environment is broadly of good condition. A number of buildings and structures have national and historic interest, including several listed buildings (see Listed Buildings below) and ancient monuments (see Scheduled Monuments below). The parish is a popular area in which to live and demand for new homes is strong. The housing stock is generally good based on 2011 census data, the main tenure comprised owner occupied (83% locally, 63% nationally), with other forms such as rented (both private and social) being relatively low. The difference between demand and the available types and tenure of residences is an issue, as well as is the affordability of existing and new homes. House price averages are relatively high.

=== Working output and travel ===
Levels of economic activity in the area are high using 2011 census figures. There are some employment opportunities locally; however, most of the residents generally travel, many by car, beyond the parish for work. A relatively high number of residents work from home (6.9%, the national average being 3.5%). The majority of people living in Holymoorside use a car, with 85% of households having access to one, compared to 74% nationally. There is provision for some public transport. Locally there is a good and regularly used network of footpaths and bridleways.

=== Local bodies ===
Holymoorside and Walton parish is managed at the first level of public administration through a parish council.

At district level, the wider area is overseen by North East Derbyshire district council. Derbyshire County Council provides the highest level strategic services locally.

== Economy ==
The present business sector types other than agriculture in the parish are varied, but are located evenly throughout except for the moor areas, with these employment areas including:

- Motor servicing and engineering
- Haulage
- Funeral services
- Several residences and farms provide holiday accommodation, caravan hire and bed & breakfast facilities, catering to Peak District visitors
- Animal welfare services nature treks, and riding school are located around Holymoorside
- Smaller various retail premises

== Community, culture and leisure ==
=== Amenities ===
There is a village hall with a large play area and memorial garden are at Holymoorside. A recreation ground is also at Holymoorside.

Small play areas are by Acorn Ride, Beeley View and Rosedale View within Walton village.

There are two public houses in the parish, at Holymoorside.

A village shop is at Holymoorside, and petrol station combined with convenience store both at Ladywood, near Chander Hill, and Walton along the A632 Matlock Road.

=== Community groups ===
Several interest groups exist in the community, predominantly at Holymoorside:

- Choral Society at Holymoorside and choral group in Walton
- Craft Group
- Dance Club
- Decoupage
- History Society
- Holymoorside Film
- Keep-fit class
- Ladies Club
- Pre-school playgroups
- Scouts
- Whist

=== Events ===
There is an annual perambulating the bounds ceremonial walk of the perimeter of the parish, which is 14 miles long and visits boundary stones installed in 2000 to commemorate the millennium.

Holymoorside hosts an annual festival held in August together with a traditional well dressing ceremony. The event first occurred in 1848, although it was by then a well established county tradition. The dressing was at the ‘Whispering Well’, near the Star Inn, rather than its present location at Loads Road.

== Education ==
There is a school at Holymoorside village, Walton Holymoorside Primary.

== Landmarks ==
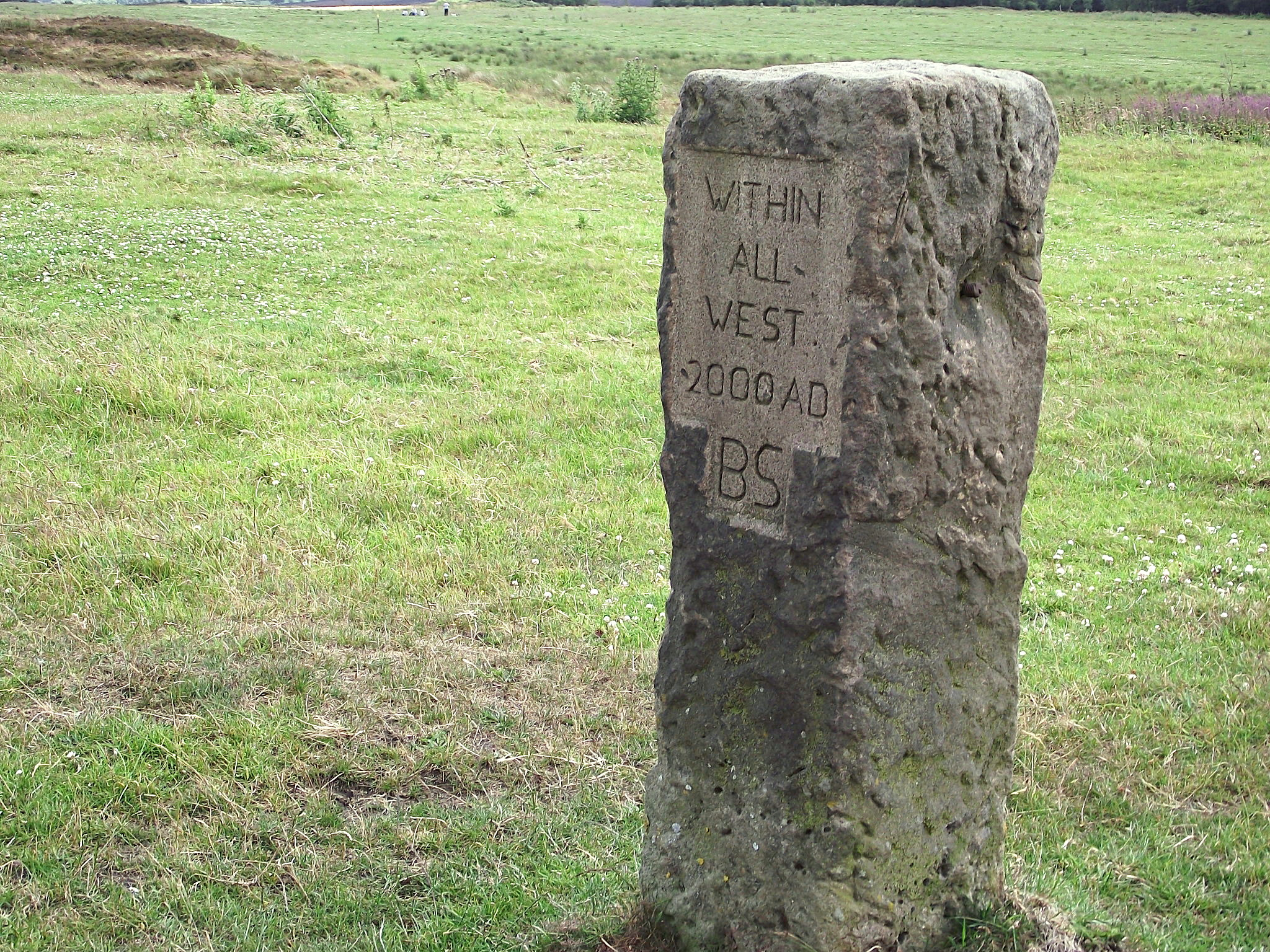
One of the boundary stones erected in 2000 to celebrate the Millennium

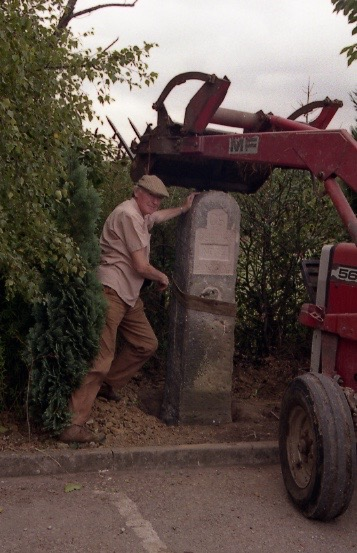
Jim McAllister at the central boundary stone erection

=== Holymoorside boundary stones ===
The Holymoorside Boundary Stones are a group of nine stones made from acquired and placed stone gate posts. Each stone is engraved and placed in specific positions. Eight stones mark positions around the boundary of Holymoorside and Walton Parish (North, Northeast, East, Southeast, South, Southwest, West and Northwest) and a final stone is placed as a centre point outside the Holymoorside Village Hall. Each stone is marked with its position e.g. ‘North’ although the centre stone is marked with C.S. They are also marked with the year ‘2000’ and two words from a poem that can be read in order starting with the North stone, then travelling clockwise around the boundary finishing at the Centre Stone (which is also marked with a heart). In addition the stones are marked with a ‘BP’, Boundary Post (a boundary between three parishes), BS, Boundary Stone (a boundary between two parishes) and CS (Centre Stone (or Chief Spriggan).

The poem reads -

High Over Low
Years Millennium Over
Our Record Stands
In Derbyshire Engraved
Within All Land
These Obelisk Note.

It can be seen that the first letter of each word spells out the name of the parish.

These engravings have been of interest to those who encounter them. They first came to the attention of the Milestone Society in January 2009 when one was described as a 'mystery post'. It was elaborated on in July 2009 when a fuller explanation was provided on pages 9 and 10 of the society's newsletter.

In addition to the stone there are also two purpose made time capsules hidden under two of them. Both time boxes contain messages and other recordings from local residents. There is no set date for the boxes to be opened and it is hoped they will remain in place for as long as possible.

During the year the stones were erected there was also the Millennium celebrations which included the drinking of a purpose made beer called ‘Bardofel’s Brew’ see below. There was also a short publication that gave details of the stones and the history of the practice of ‘Beating the Bounds’. The book detailed walks around the stones and the walks have been used on a regular basis by local people and Parish Councillors to mark the boundary. It is a practice known to have been in existence in the past as a way of establishing boundaries in which local taxes were a factor. A noticeable 'beating of the bounds' using the stones as the markers was made by Councillor Martin Thacker in 2009 and detailed in the journal Great British Life by Richard Bradley (who also mentions the stones in his book 'Secret Chesterfield' who had also been present. It has since been the intention of this being an annual event, and has also become a popular ramblers route.

Whilst the stones were designed and erected in an attempt to mark the position of the parish at the point of the millennium there was also a short story written that gave an alternative account. This story was a tale of local fairies who almost came to war due to the meddling of an evil giant called ‘Quarlerk’ but were brought back to peace with the help of a group of nine friendly spriggans who were turned to stone. The story was shared with humans by 'Bardofel-orel-forest’, the keeper of tales and brewer of beer.

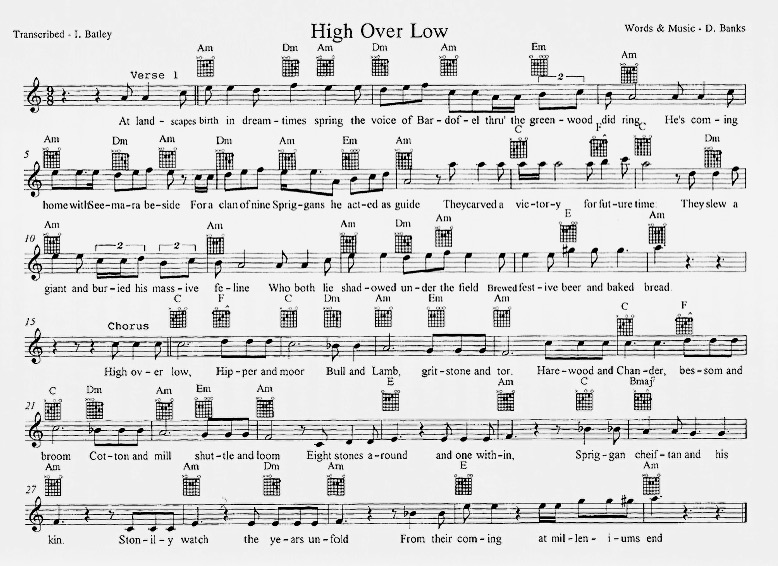
High Over Low

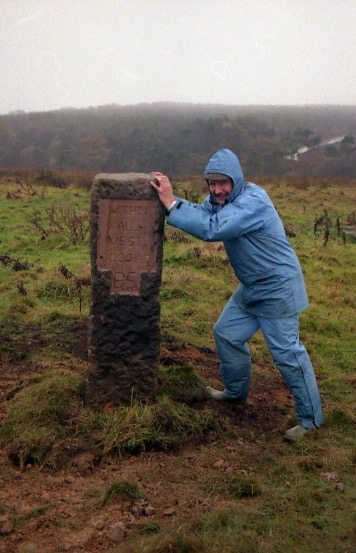
Graham Wheelwright at stones erection

In addition to the history, tale, beer, walks and stones there is also music to accompany it. The words are -

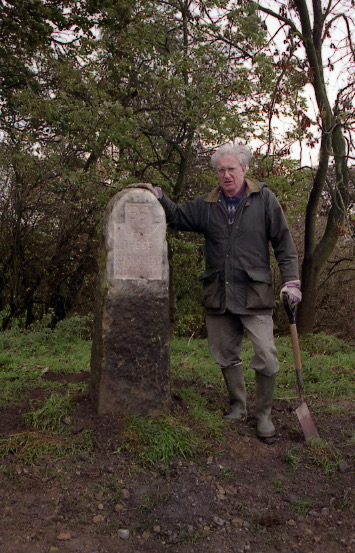
Adrian Marsden Jones at stone erection

High over low
At landscapes birth, in dreamtime’s spring
The voice of Bardofel through greenwood did ring.
He’s coming home with Seemara beside;
For a clan of nine Spriggans he acted as guide.
They all carved a victory for future time:
Slew a giant and buried his massive feline,
(who both lie shadowed under the field)
and brewed festive beer and ate bread.
High over low, Hipper and moor,
Bull and Lamb, gritstone and tor,
Harewood and Chander, besom and broom,
Cotton and mill, shuttle and loom,
Eight stones around, and one stone within:
Spriggan chieftain and his kin
Stonely watch the years unfold
From their coming at Millenniums end
At villages birth, on Hipper's shore,
Textile merchant built factory floor.
Miners strode daily to Brampton pits,
Pot-clay tunnels on Cathole heights.
Smelted lead ran and poisoned the ground,
But veiled Spriggans continued to surround
The houses pouring forth their hearth-black smoke,
Where dwelt those who drank beer and ate bread.
At Millenniums end, in mammons spring,
When woods are despoiled and cellphones do ring
And computer traders do peddle their wares
And commuters all work with their stocks and their shares
And Safeway bakes bread and Townes brew the beer.
At Millenniums end at Rogation in year,
We’ll keep watch at the stones perimeter;
Drink Bardofel’s brew and eat gingerbread.

There is no one person to take credit for the stones and it is a testament to the people of the parish that such a project came to fruition. A lot of the work came down to a special formed committee which included -

- James Martin - Initial idea, design, poem, fairy story creation, booklet editing.
- Adrian Marsden Jones - committee chair.
- Jim McAllister - historical society representative and author of booklet chapter on History of Boundary Stones.
- Graham Wheelwright - creator of the boundary stone walks.
- Dave Banks - composer of High Over Low (transcribed by Ian Batley).
- Ron Elliot - engraver.
- Bill Madin and John Taylor - stone erection.
- Sir Tony Robinson - Short forward in booklet.

The original booklet is no longer in print but James Martin re-wrote the story and it can be found in his book The Man with Hands for Hands and the Secret of the Stones.

=== Conservation ===
==== Listed buildings ====
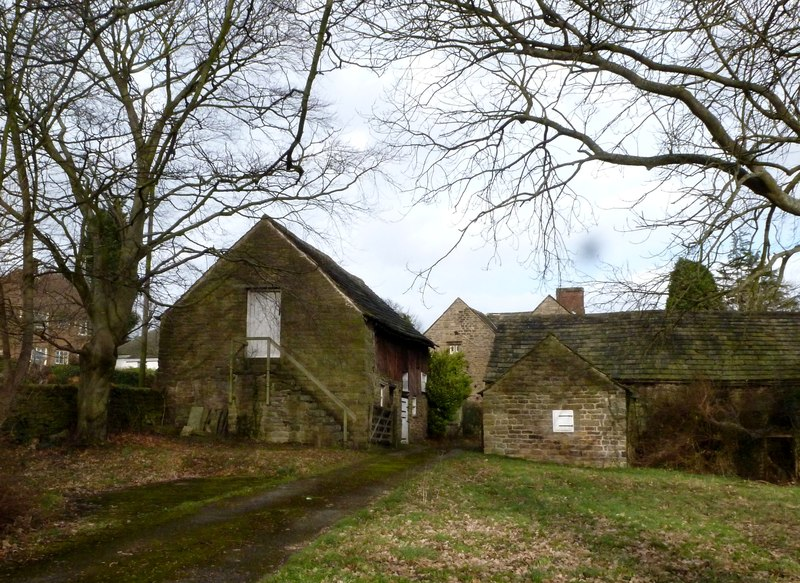
Tithe (cruck) barn at Hipper Hall

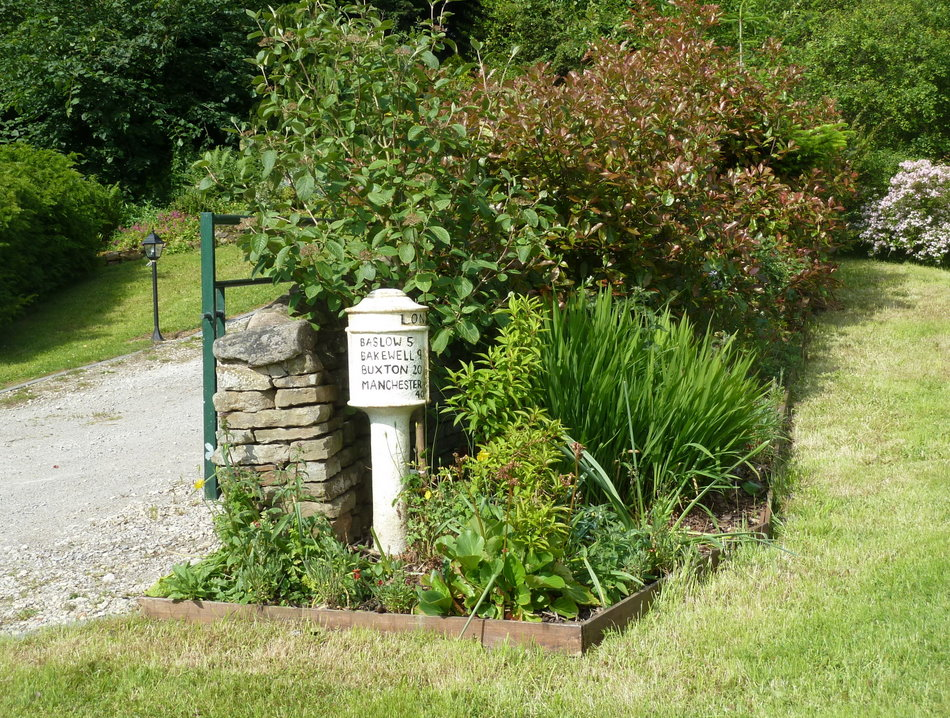
Listed milepost by the A619 road

There are 18 locations of architectural merit throughout the parish with listed status all at Grade II, including notably:

- Hipper Hall
- Walton Lodge
- War memorial
- A cruck barn attached to Hipper Hall
- A milepost

Several other varied buildings types, mainly farmhouses, barns and other agricultural outbuildings, are featured.

==== Scheduled monuments ====
There are three scheduled monuments, two of which are all in Longside Moor and are cairn and barrow related items dating from the Bronze Age. The last is the Red lead/smelting mill/eventual corn mill site within Nether Loads, in use from the end of the 16th century until the 19th.

==== Sites of Special Scientific Interest ====
To the west of the parish by the Hipper Sick stream, is an area notable for its historic formation of rocks, which date from the Carboniferous period, and is deemed as a Site of Special Scientific Interest (SSSI) known as the Harewood Grange Stream Section.

==== Green belt ====
The whole parish, except for the two main villages is completely covered by the North East Derbyshire Green Belt, which is a part of the more extensive South and West Yorkshire Green Belt, its function affording planning protection from urban sprawl and inappropriate development.

=== War memorial ===
A monument commemorating 16 locals who served in but did not return from the World War I and WWII conflicts is within a memorial garden at Holymoorside village, close to the village hall.

== Sport ==
Tennis courts and a club have been based in Holymoorside since the 1930s. A bowling club is based at Holymoorside.

Walton contains Chesterfield Golf Club to the far east of the parish, while Stanedge Golf Club is to the south near Slatepit Dale. Both are 18 hole golf courses.

== Religious sites ==
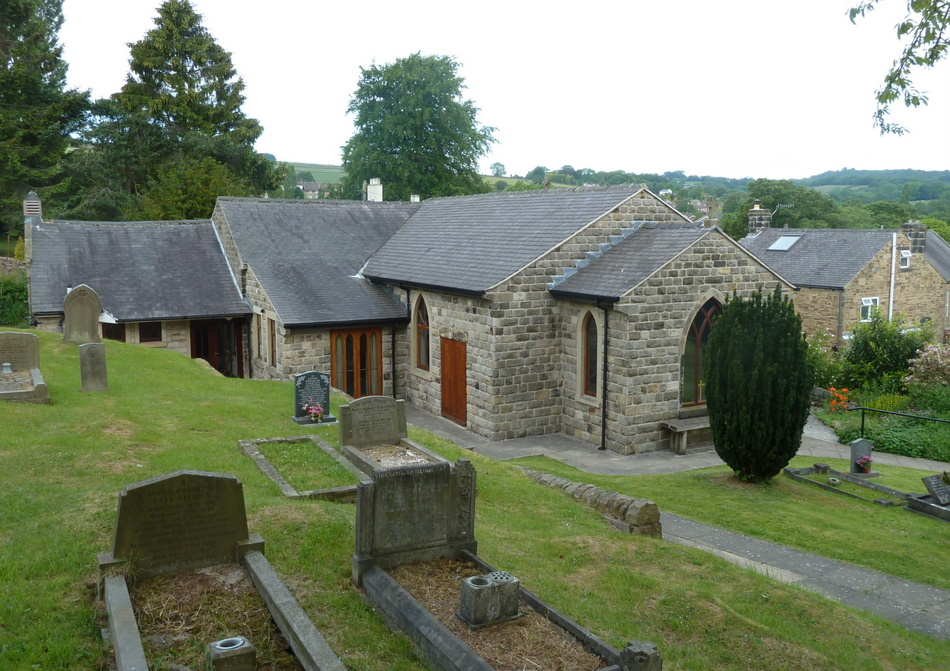
Church of St Peter, Holymoorside

Anglican sites in the parish are St Peter's in Holymoorside village which was built in 1841, and St John's in Walton which was constructed in 1918, and rebuilt in 1992. In Holymoorside, other present Christian groups include the United Reformed Church, and Methodists.

== Notable people ==
- Charles Dakeyne Gladwin (1775–1844), of Belmont, Lieutenant-Colonel of the Derbyshire Militia, son of Major-General Henry Gladwin
- Sir Joshua Jebb (1793–1863), KCB, owner of Walton Lodge
- Simeon Manlove (1809–1895), local industrialist and village philanthropist
