= Joshua Jebb =

British military engineer (1793–1863)

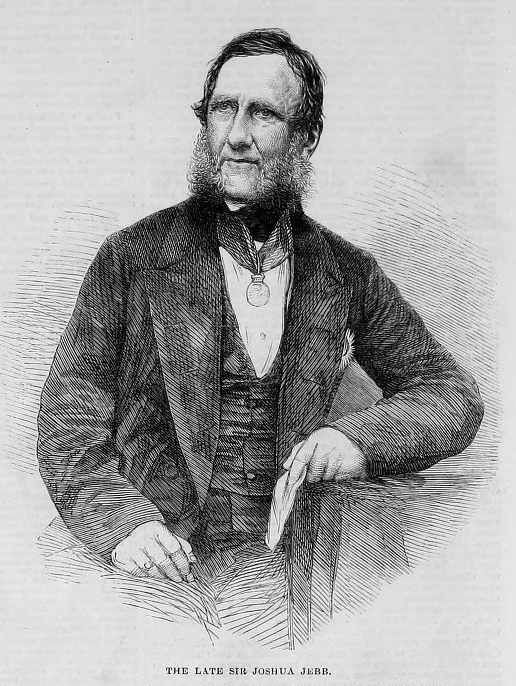
- Born: 8 May 1793; Chesterfield, Derbyshire, England
- Died: 26 June 1863 (aged 70)
- Occupations: military engineer and the British Surveyor-General of convict prisons

Sir Joshua Jebb, KCB (8 May 1793 – 26 June 1863) was a British officer of the Royal Engineers who participated in the Battle of Plattsburgh on Lake Champlain during the War of 1812, He became Surveyor-General of convict prisons. By 1850, Pentonville Prison which he had designed had become a template for prison construction across the British Empire. Michael Ignatieff described Pentonville as "the culmination of a history of efforts to devise a perfectly rational and reformative mode of imprisonment".

Jebb was also involved in designing Woking Convict Invalid Prison, Broadmoor Hospital, a secure mental hospital in Crowthorne in Berkshire, and Mountjoy Prison in the centre of Dublin.

== Early life ==
He was born at Chesterfield on 8 May 1793, the eldest son of Joshua Jebb of Walton Hall, Derbyshire and his wife Dorothy, daughter of General Henry Gladwin of Stubbing Court. His father, a grand-nephew of Samuel Jebb and John Jebb (Dean of Cashel), belonged to a family who produced a number of distinguished descendants, and had once had property in England and the West Indies, but he largely lost his wealth. His sister Frances married William Miles (1797–1844), a shipowner and West India merchant, and bought the estate of Firbeck Hall which was later inherited by his descendants.

After passing through the Royal Military Academy at Woolwich, Jebb was commissioned as a second lieutenant in the Royal Engineers on 1 July 1812. He was promoted to first lieutenant on 21 July 1813, and embarked for Canada in the following October.

Jebb served with the army under the command of General Francis de Rottenburg on the frontier of Lower Canada until the summer of 1814, when he joined the army of Lieutenant-general Sir George Prevost in the United States, and took part in the campaign of the autumn of 1814. He was present at the Battle of Plattsburgh, 11 September 1814, and was thanked in general orders.

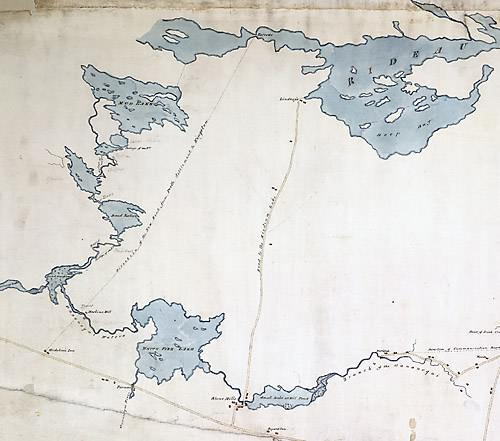
Jebb's route which he surveyed for the Rideau Canal. Eventually an alternative route was chosen.

In 1816, Jebb completed a survey for a canal which was designed to allow access to the Canadian heartland. His route, however, was not followed by Colonel By in building the Rideau Canal; he had chosen a way between Ottawa River and Kingston where Lake Ontario flows into Saint Lawrence River.

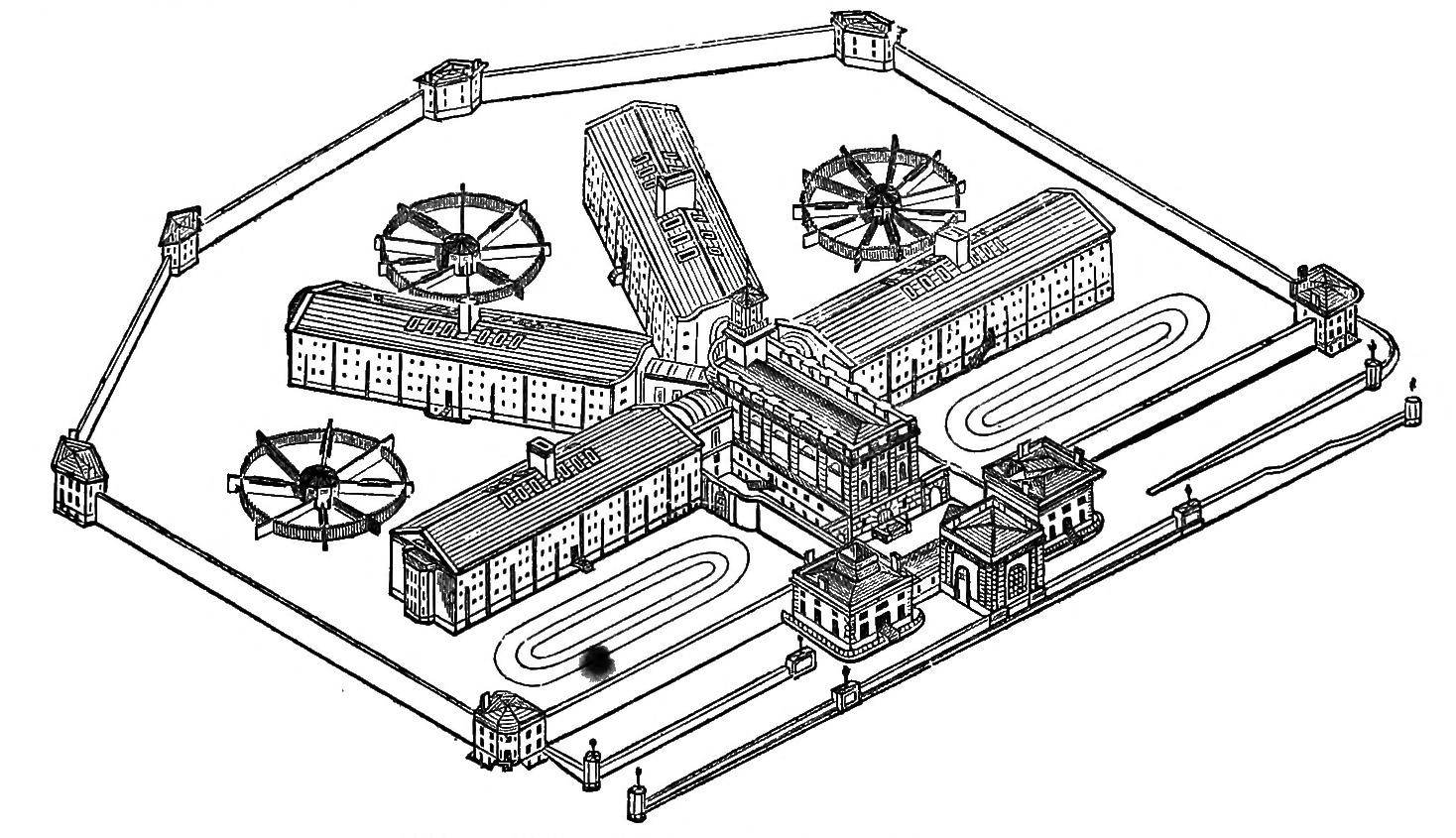
An isometric drawing of Pentonville prison from an 1844 report to J.Jebb

Jebb returned to England in 1820, after an extended service in Canada. He was stationed at Woolwich and afterwards at Hull until December 1827, when he embarked for the West Indies. He was promoted second captain on 26 February 1828, and was invalided home in September 1829. Having recovered his health he was sent to Chatham. Jebb was appointed adjutant of the royal sappers and miners at Chatham on 11 February 1831, and promoted first captain on 10 January 1837.

On 10 March 1838 Jebb was appointed by the Lord President of the council to hold inquiries on the grants of charters of incorporation to Bolton and Sheffield, and on 21 May of the same year he was made a member of the commission on the municipal boundary of Birmingham. On 23 November 1841 he received a brevet majority for his past services.

== Prisons ==
Jebb was appointed Surveyor-General of prisons, a technical adviser to the Home Office, and was employed in designing county and borough prisons. He associated with the inspectors William Crawford (1788–1847) and the Rev. William Whitworth Russell, in the design and construction of the "Model Prison" at Pentonville. Jebb continued in his military duties, and was quartered at Birmingham until he was seconded on 20 September 1839. The penal system was then in transition. In 1837 inquiries conducted in America by Crawford had led to the adoption in principle of the "separate system" of prison discipline. The decline of penal transportation meant the Government was turning to an alternative method of punishing criminals.

Beginning with a period of strict separation at Pentonville, the convicts were then to be passed to a prison constructed with a view to their employment on public works. For this purpose Jebb designed the prison at Portland. Similar prisons were subsequently erected at Dartmoor, Chatham, Portsmouth and the Isle of Wight. In 1843–4 Jebb erected a terrace of houses, part of Parkhurst Prison on the Isle of Wight: Nicholson Street, now listed buildings. On 29 June 1843 he was made a commissioner for the government of Pentonville Prison.

In 1844, Jebb was appointed a member of a royal commission to report on the punishment of military crime by imprisonment. The commission recommended the establishment of prisons for the exclusive reception of military prisoners, and under the supervision of an officer to be termed inspector-general of military prisons, who should also supervise provost and regimental cells. Jebb was appointed to this office on 27 December 1844 in addition to his other duties. Subsequently it was held by the officer at the head of civil prisons, at this period a post held by an officer of the Royal Engineers.

Jebb was promoted lieutenant-colonel on 16 April 1847. On 1 May 1849 his appointment as commissioner of Pentonville prison was renewed. In 1850, a board, called the Directors of Convict Prisons, was formed to replace the various bodies which had previously managed the different convict prisons. Jebb was appointed chairman of the board, and under his direction the new system was adopted and developed.

A notable example of Jebb’s designs was Chatham Convict Prison in Kent, built as part of his system of large, organised convict establishments for public works. It opened in 1856, replacing the use of prison hulks such as Defence and Warrior at Woolwich. Although such developments diverged from Jebb’s earlier uniform prison model, they were considered necessary adaptations as the convict system expanded.

== Later life ==
Jebb retired from the army, leaving military service on full pay retirement on 1 January 1850; his successor as Survey General of Prisons was Major Edmund Henderson. He subsequently received the honorary rank of colonel on 28 November 1854. He was made a KCB for his civil services on 25 March 1859. In 1861 and 1862 he served on commissions appointed to consider the construction of embankments of the River Thames, and of communications between the embankment at Blackfriars Bridge and the Mansion House, and between Westminster Bridge and Millbank.

Jebb died suddenly on 26 June 1863 in Charing Cross, London, coming off the omnibus from Parson's Green, where he resided, and was buried in Brookwood Cemetery.

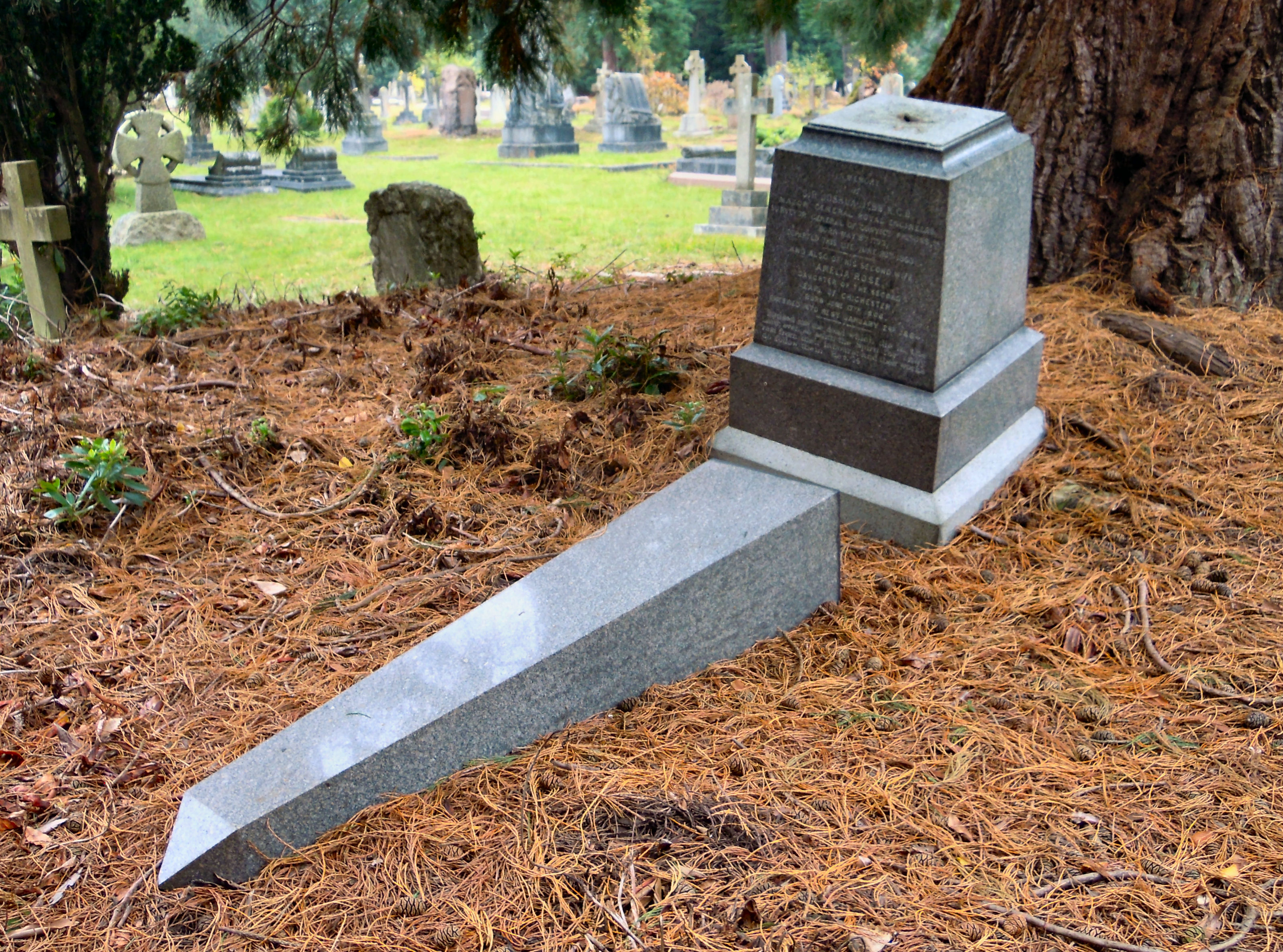
Jebb's grave in Brookwood Cemetery

== Major works ==
Jebb's works included:

- A Practical Treatise on Strengthening and Defending Outposts, Villages, Houses, Bridges, Chatham, 1836.
- Modern Prisons : their Construction and Ventilation, with plates, London, 1844.
- Notes on the Theory and Practice of Sinking Artesian Wells, 1844.
- Manual for the Militia, or Fighting made Easy : a Practical Treatise on Strengthening and Defending Military Posts in reference to the Duties of a Force engaged in Disputing the Advance of an Enemy, London, 1853.
- A Flying Shot at Fergusson and his "Perils of Portsmouth," "Invasion of England", pamphlet, London, 1853.
- A practical treatise on the Duties to be performed ... at a siege, 3rd Edition, London, William Clowes and Son, 1860, London

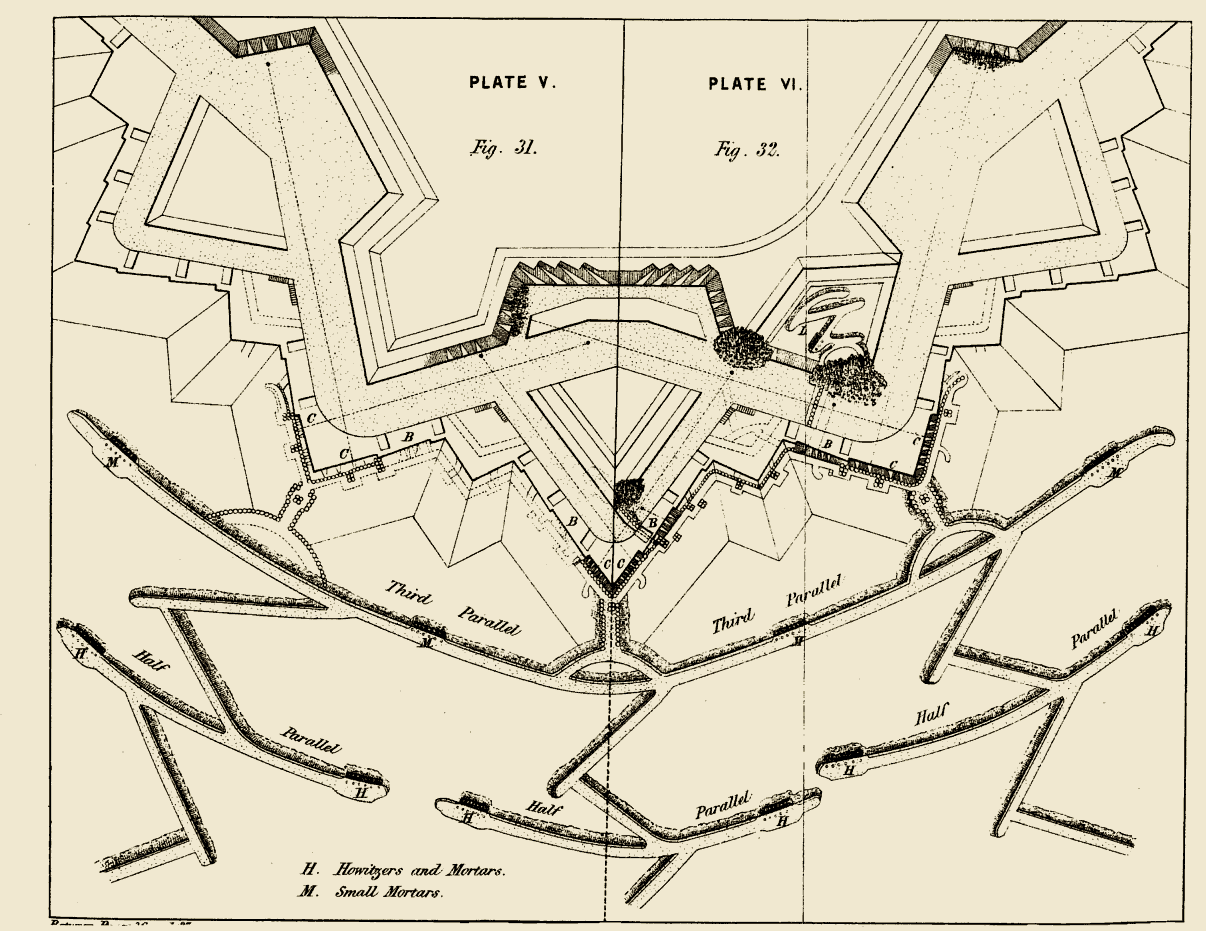
The 3rd edition of his treatise on siege warfare was published in 1860.

- Observations on the Defence of London, with Suggestions respecting the necessary Works, London, 1860.
- Reports and Observations on the Discipline and Management of Convict Prisons, edited by the Earl of Chichester, London, 1863.

== Family ==
Jebb married twice; firstly, on 14 June 1830 Mary Legh Thomas, daughter of William Burtinshaw Thomas, of Highfield, Derbyshire, who died in 1850. They had a son and three daughters. The children were:

- Captain Joshua Gladwyn Jebb of Barnby Moor House, born 1839. He was father of Captain Sydney Gladwyn Jebb JP, of Firbeck Hall, and grandfather of Gladwyn Jebb of the United Nations.
- Mary Dorothy, married 1854 the cleric Henry Ellison.
- Emily Sarah, married 1860 Basil Charles Boothby of the 95th Regiment.
- Frances Beatrice, married the cleric William Edmund Batty, and was mother of De Witt Batty.

Jebb married, secondly on 5 September 1854, Lady Amelia Rose Pelham, daughter of Thomas Pelham, the Earl of Chichester, who survived him.

== See also ==
- Chatham Convict Prison
