= Walton, Chesterfield =

Suburb of Chesterfield, Derbyshire, England

Coordinates: 53°13′N 1°28′W

Walton
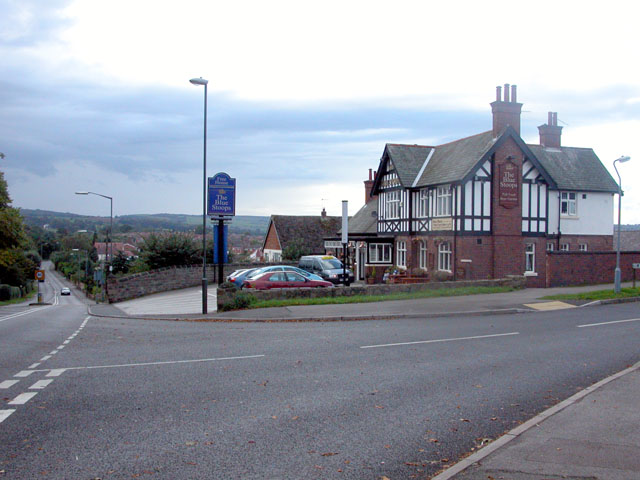
- Blue Stoops Inn

- Location within Derbyshire
- District: Chesterfield
- Shire county: Derbyshire
- Region: East Midlands
- Country: England
- Sovereign state: United Kingdom
- Post town: CHESTERFIELD
- Postcode district: S42
- Dialling code: 01246
- UK Parliament: Chesterfield

Walton is a suburb of Chesterfield, in the Chesterfield district, in the county of Derbyshire, England. Walton extends into the neighbouring North East Derbyshire district, with a small portion centred around the Acorn Ridge road and St. John's church within the Holymoorside and Walton civil parish. The population of the appropriate Chesterfield ward taken at the 2011 Census was 2,489.

Mary, Queen of Scots stayed for two nights in February 1569 at the house of Mr Foljambe near Chesterfield, thought to be Godfrey Foljambe of Walton. Walton was one of the homes of the protestant patron Isabel Foljambe who was the wife of the local magistrate, Godfrey Foljambe. She took into her home Katherine Wright who was said to be possessed. An exorcism was conducted by John Darnell who became known for this ability and he was later arrested as a fraud.

Among its attractions are a few shops, a golf course, and a pub called The Blue Stoops on Matlock Road (A632). The River Hipper runs by Walton and feeds Walton Dam. There are two Christian churches in Walton: St. John's (Anglican) and Walton Evangelical Church. In 2006, the rebuilt St. John's was opened and is able to accommodate a larger congregation than the previous building. It is situated on the edge of the countryside, while Walton Evangelical is situated in the heart of the suburb.

== Sport ==
The Ashover Barbarians Cricket Club plays matches at the Robinsons Sports Ground cricket facility by Walton Dam.

== See also ==
- Listed buildings in Holymoorside and Walton
