= Humphrey Smith (businessman) =

British businessman and brewer (1944–2026)

- Born: 17 December 1944; Tadcaster, West Riding of Yorkshire, England
- Died: 29 June 2026 (aged 81)
- Education: Eton College
- Occupations: Businessman; brewer
- Known for: Owner of Samuel Smith Old Brewery
- Spouse: Julia Gladstone (m. 1985)
- Children: 2

Humphrey Smith (17 December 1944 – 29 June 2026) was a British businessman and brewer, who was the owner and chairman of Samuel Smith Old Brewery in Tadcaster, North Yorkshire, England. The brewery, established in 1758, claims to be Yorkshire's oldest brewery and operates over 200 pubs across the United Kingdom.

== Early life and education ==
Smith was born in Tadcaster, West Riding of Yorkshire, on 17 December 1944. He grew up at Oxton Hall, a Queen Anne-style estate acquired by his grandfather in 1919. Smith attended Eton College from 1958 to 1963.

== Career ==
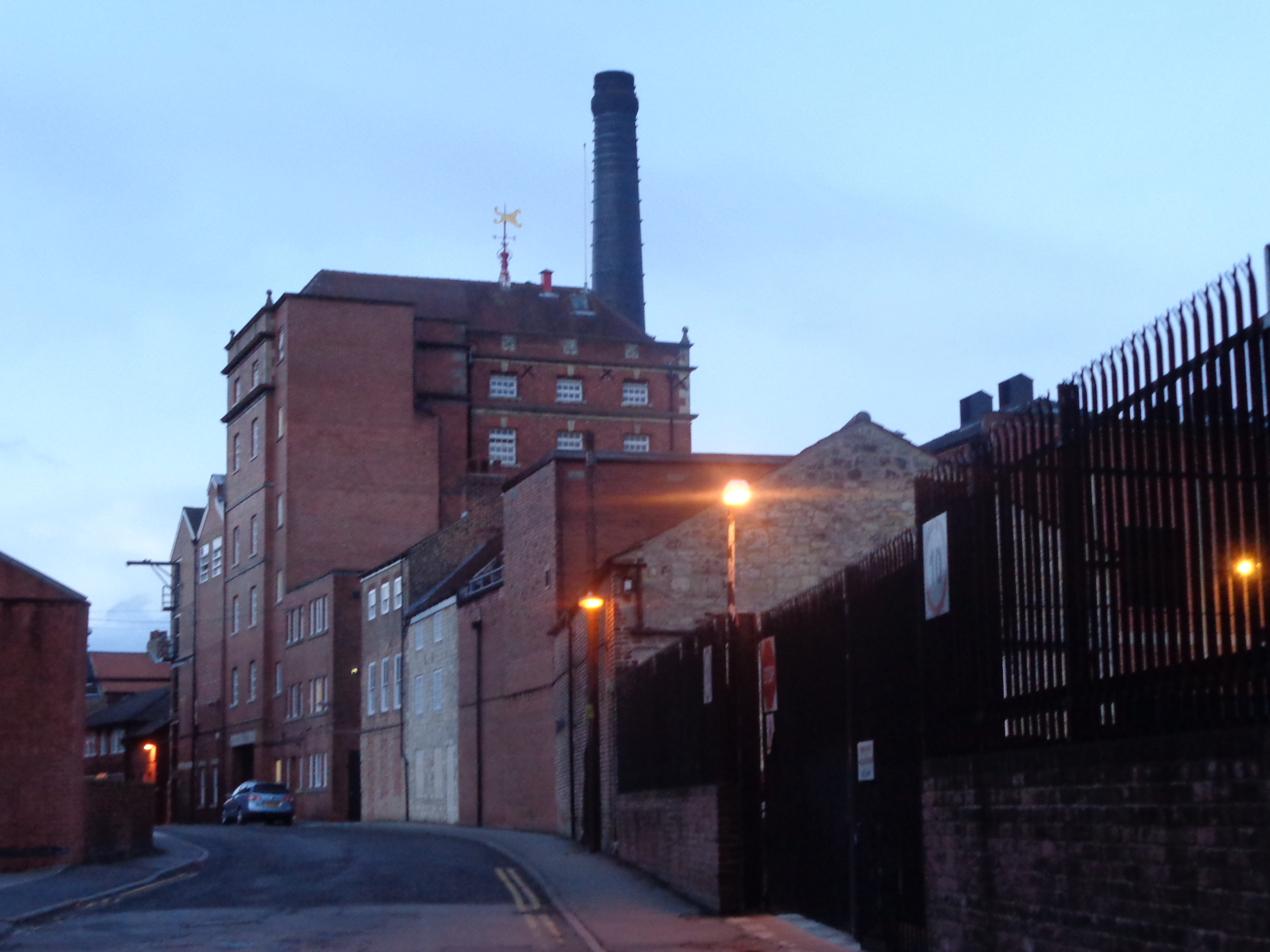
Samuel Smith's Old Brewery, Tadcaster

After leaving Eton, Smith worked with his father, Geoffrey, at the family business. In May 1965, when Humphrey was 20, his father died and, for a few years, the brewery was managed by executors and solicitors before Humphrey and his younger brother Oliver gradually assumed control, taking full charge by the early 1980s.

=== Management style, controversies and philanthropy ===
Humphrey Smith was known for his unconventional management style at Samuel Smith Brewery and its pubs. He implemented policies such as banning music, television, mobile devices, and children in the company's pubs. His brewery maintains traditional practices, including the use of dray horses for some beer deliveries. His management was characterised as highly controlling, with Smith known to personally visit pubs to enforce company rules, occasionally resulting in immediate closures. On one occasion, a pub in Sheffield was closed after it failed to serve his preferred dessert.

Criticism was also directed at Smith's management of the brewery's property portfolio, particularly in Tadcaster, where many Samuel Smith-owned pubs and residential properties remain unoccupied. Some have suggested that this approach has contributed to the decline of the local high street. Smith's brewery faced criticism from the GMB trade union over its treatment of managers. In 2022, former managers won a constructive dismissal case against his company, with the judge raising concerns about its workplace culture.

Smith's philanthropic contributions included funding the construction of the Tadcaster Community Swimming Pool, which opened in 1994 on brewery land. In 1995, the brewery also undertook the restoration of the 14th-century Old Vicarage, surpassing English Heritage standards. Despite these efforts, the Old Vicarage has remained unoccupied since its renovation.

== Personal life, views and death ==
Smith was known for his reclusive and frugal nature. He lived with his wife, Julia, at Oxton Hall in North Yorkshire. The couple were married in June 1985, and had two children, a daughter and a son. He was reported to walk long distances to avoid taxi fares, and to opt for a bus pass instead of driving.

Smith held conservative Christian views, reportedly influenced by his maternal grandfather, who served as the Bishop of Selby. He died on 29 June 2026, aged 81.
