= Listed buildings in Tadcaster =

Tadcaster is a civil parish in the county of North Yorkshire, England. It contains 51 listed buildings that are recorded in the National Heritage List for England. Of these, three are listed at Grade II*, the middle of the three grades, and the others are at Grade II, the lowest grade. The parish contains the market town of Tadcaster and the surrounding countryside. The town contains a number of breweries, and some buildings associated with them are listed. Otherwise, most of the listed buildings are houses, shops and offices, a public house, churches and a sundial in a churchyard, two bridges, a former Sunday school, five mileposts, a former bank and a telephone kiosk.

== Key ==
Grade	Criteria
II*	Particularly important buildings of more than special interest
II	Buildings of national importance and special interest

== Buildings ==
Name and location	Photograph	Date	Notes	Grade
St Mary's Church; 53.88558°N 1.26225°W		c. 1300	Most of the church dates from the late 14th to the early 15th century, and in 1875–77 it was raised and rebuilt because of flooding. The church is built in magnesian limestone with a Welsh slate roof, and consists of a nave, a chancel, both with north and south aisles, a south porch and a west tower. The tower has three stages, diagonal buttresses rising to pinnacles, a round-arched west doorway with a moulded surround and a hood mould, and a five-light west window. On the south side is a niche with a canopy, and above are string courses, clock faces, two-light bell openings, and an embattled parapet with eight crocketed pinnacles. Along the body of the church are buttresses surmounted by pinnacles.	II*
The Ark; 53.88448°N 1.26238°W		15th century	A house that has been much altered and later used for other purposes. It is timber framed with whitewashed infill, underbuilt with magnesian limestone and orange brick, and with a swept pantile roof. There are two storeys, a range of two bays, and a projecting gabled wing on the right. On the front of the wing is a doorway between bow windows, on the left is an angle buttress, and above is an oriel window with wooden mullions. The upper floor projects slightly on corbels, and the gable is supported by brackets with carved figures. On the range to the left are two 20th-century fixed-light windows, one full height.	II*
The Old Vicarage; 53.88437°N 1.26308°W		c. 1500	The building, at one time a vicarage, has been altered and restored. It is in limestone, with infill in brick and breeze block, quoins, a chamfered eaves band, and a slate roof with a coped gable. There are two storeys, a main range, and a gabled wing to the north. It contains various openings, some blocked, including doorways with a chamfered surround, one with a hood mould, and windows of different sizes, some mullioned.	II*
Tadcaster Bridge; 53.88505°N 1.25988°W		Late 17th century	The bridge, also known as Wharfe Bridge, which carries a road over the River Wharfe, was widened in the late 18th century. It is in magnesian limestone, and consists of seven segmental arches. The bridge has rounded cutwaters upstream, a solid parapet with capping, curved splayed ends, and round end piers.	II
1, 3 and 5 Bridge Street; 53.88441°N 1.26051°W		Early 18th century	A house, later shops, in magnesian limestone with a swept roof in stone slate and pantile, hipped on the right. There are two storeys and four bays. The ground floor contains two doorways with oblong fanlights, the left in a 20th-century shopfront. The right doorway has pilasters, in a shopfront with pilasters and a modillion hood. On the upper floor are sash windows in chamfered architraves.	II
18 High Street; 53.88356°N 1.26238°W		Early 18th century	The house, later used for other purposes, is in pinkish-brown brick with a swept pantile roof. There are two storeys and two bays. On the ground floor, steps lead up to a central doorway with a soldier arch, between two canted bay windows. The upper floor contains horizontally sliding sash windows.	II
24 and 26 High Street; 53.88350°N 1.26262°W		Early 18th century	A pair of houses in pinkish-brown brick, with a floor band, and a roof of pantile and stone slate, higher and hipped on the right. There are two storeys, an L-shaped plan, and a front of four bays. The third bay contains a carriage entrance, and it is flanked by bow windows with pilasters and cornices. On the left bay is a round-arched doorway with a radial fanlight, and the upper floor has sash windows in architraves.	II
24 Kirkgate; 53.88462°N 1.26217°W		Mid-18th century	The house is in pinkish-brown brick on a stone plinth, and has a roof of stone slate and pantile with stone coping on the right. There are two storeys and three bays. On the front is a doorway with a cambered head flanked by bow windows, the right with a dentilled cornice. The upper floor has a blocked window between casements, all under segmental arches of gauged brick.	II
9 Wharfe Bank Terrace; 53.88497°N 1.26097°W		Mid-18th century	The house is in magnesian limestone on a plinth, with a modillion eaves band, and a swept Welsh slate roof, with a stone kneeler and coping on the right. The central doorway has pilasters, an oblong fanlight, a dentilled frieze, and a hood on consoles. The windows are sashes with flat arches of voussoirs.	II
18 York Road; 53.88728°N 1.25679°W	—	Mid-18th century	The house is in orange-brown brick on a magnesian limestone plinth, with quoins, a floor band, a dentilled eaves band, and a pantile roof. There are two storeys and five bays. The doorway in the second bay has fluted Doric columns, a radial fanlight, a frieze and a hood. The windows are sashes with quoined jambs, and flat gauged brick arches with keystones.	II
Director's offices, John Smith's Brewery; 53.88323°N 1.26306°W		Mid-18th century	A house, later used as offices, in magnesian limestone, with a dentilled eaves band, and a Welsh slate roof, hipped on the right with red brick coping, and with a stone coped gable on the left. There are two storeys and three bays. The central doorway has a moulded architrave, an oblong fanlight, and a tripartite keystone. The windows are sashes with wedge lintels.	II
Sundial, St Mary's Church; 53.88534°N 1.26237°W		18th century (probable)	The sundial in the churchyard to the south of the church is in stone, and is about 1.5 metres (4 ft 11 in) in height. It has a stepped circular base on which is a vase-shaped pedestal, and an octagonal top with a bronze dial.	II
The Angel and White Horse; 53.88390°N 1.26127°W		18th century	The public house, which incorporates earlier material, is in magnesian limestone and pinkish-orange brick, on a plinth, with a moulded cornice, and a pantile roof, hipped on the left. There are three storeys and six bays. The fourth and sixth bays are full-height canted bay windows. Between them is a doorway with pilasters and a hood, and to the left is a carriage arch. The other windows are sashes, and under the carriage arch is exposed 16th-century timber framing.	II
1 and 3 Chapel Street; 53.88360°N 1.26347°W		Mid to late 18th century	A pair of houses in magnesian limestone on a plinth, with a floor band, a moulded eaves cornice, and a hipped pantile roof. There are two storeys and two bays. Steps lead up to the round-headed doorways with radial fanlights. Between them are bow windows with sash windows, and the windows on the upper floor are sashes.	II
3 High Street; 53.88367°N 1.26165°W		Mid to late 18th century	A house, later a shop, in pinkish-orange brick on a stone plinth, with stone dressings, a floor band, a modillion eaves band, and a Welsh slate roof. There are three storeys and three bays. The ground floor contains a shop window flanked by doorways. On the upper floors are sash windows, on the centre bay they are tripartite, the windows in the middle floor have moulded architraves, and those on the top floor have wedge lintels.	II
5 High Street; 53.88363°N 1.26173°W		Mid to late 18th century	A house, later a shop, in pinkish-orange brick, with stone dressings, sill bands, a modillion eaves band, and a Welsh slate roof. There are three storeys and three bays. On the ground floor, to the right, is a shopfront consisting of a doorway between bow window, and to the left is a bow window. The upper floors contain two-storey bow windows with tripartite sashes.	II
7 and 9 High Street; 53.88352°N 1.26196°W		Mid to late 18th century	A house, later a shop, in pinkish-orange brick, with a swept pantile roof. There are three storeys and three bays. On the ground floor is a doorway with pilasters and a modillion hood. To its left is a shopfront with a doorway and a canted shop window, and to the right of the doorway is another canted shop window. The right bay on the middle floor has a canted bay window, and the other windows are sashes in architraves with flat gauged brick arches.	II
2 Wharfe Bank Terrace; 53.88446°N 1.26033°W		Mid to late 18th century	The house is in magnesian limestone, with sill bands, a modillion eaves band and a pantile roof. There are two storeys and three bays. The central doorway has an oblong fanlight and a cambered head. On the outer bays are canted bay windows with dentilled cornices, containing sashes.	II
5 and 7 Wharfe Bank Terrace; 53.88489°N 1.26090°W		Mid to late 18th century	A house divided into two, it is in magnesian limestone on a plinth, with a modillion eaves band and a Welsh slate roof. There are two storeys and four bays. The two doorways each has pilasters, an oblong fanlight, a dentilled cornice, and a hood on consoles. The windows are sashes with flat arches of voussoirs.	II
16 York Road; 53.88724°N 1.25690°W	—	Mid to late 18th century	The house is in pinkish-brown brick on a magnesian limestone plinth and has a pantile roof. There are two storeys and one bay. The doorway on the left has an oblong fanlight, to the right are two sash windows, and the upper floor has one sash window. The ground floor openings have cambered arches.	II
2 Bridge Street and 1 Wharfe Bank Terrace; 53.88475°N 1.26069°W		Late 18th century	A house, later divided into two, on a corner site. It is in pinkish-orange brick on a stone plinth, with magnesian limestone dressings, a double dentilled eaves cornice with bead and reel moulding, and a pantile roof, hipped on the left. There are three storeys, four bays on the front and one on the left return. The doorway on the front has fluted Doric columns, a radial fanlight, a frieze and a hood, and on the left return is a similar doorway. The windows are sashes, those in the lower two floors with stone wedge lintels and fluted keystones.	II
11 Bridge Street; 53.88422°N 1.26075°W		Late 18th century	A house later used for other purposes, it is in pinkish-brown brick with stone dressings, quoins, sill bands, a dentilled cornice and a pantile roof. There are three storeys and one bay. The ground floor has a 20th-century shopfront with pilasters and a hood, and above is a two-storey canted bay window with casements.	II
13, 15 and 17 Bridge Street; 53.88413°N 1.26089°W		Late 18th century	There houses, later shops, in pinkish-orange brick on plinths, with stone dressings, sill bands, a eaves band, and a pantile roof. There are three storeys and three bays. On the ground floor are three doorways with fanlights, and three bay windows, all in a pilastered surround with an acanthus console on the right, a dentilled frieze and a cornice. The upper floors contain sash windows with wedge lintels.	II
19 Bridge Street; 53.88411°N 1.26101°W		Late 18th century	A house, later a shop, in pinkish-orange brick on a plinth, with stone dressings, sill bands, an eaves band on the left, a stepped cornice on the right, and a pantile roof. There are three storeys and two bays. The ground floor contains carriage doors with pilasters on the left, a doorway with an oblong fanlight within a 19th-century shopfront on the right, all under a frieze and a modillion cornice. Above, the left bay has sash windows in architraves with wedge lintels, and on the right bay is a two-storey bow window with tripartite sashes.	II
21 Bridge Street; 53.88401°N 1.26110°W		Late 18th century	A house, later a shop, in pinkish-orange brick, with stone dressings, sill bands, an eaves cornice on stepped brackets, and a pantile roof. There are three storeys and two bays. The ground floor contains a 20th-century shopfront, and each upper bay has a two-storey bow window with tripartite sashes.	II
28 High Street; 53.88343°N 1.26275°W		Late 18th century	The house is in brick on a stone plinth, with quoins, a modillion eaves band and a Welsh slate roof. There are three storeys and three bays. Steps lead up to a doorway in the left bay, with a moulded architrave, an oblong fanlight and a keystone. To the right is a bow window, and the upper floors have sash windows, those in the middle floor with gauged flat brick arches and keystones.	II
47 Kirkgate; 53.88471°N 1.26261°W		Late 18th century	A house, later used for other purposes, in pinkish-brown brick on a stone plinth, with dressings in magnesian limestone and red brick, quoins, sill bands, a modillion eaves band, and a Welsh slate roof with stone coping on the left. There are three storeys and five bays. Steps with an iron balustrade lead up to the central doorway that has an architrave, an oblong fanlight, and a triangular pediment on consoles. The window above the doorway is false, and the others are sashes with flat arches in gauged red brick, and triple stone keystones.	II
49 Kirkgate; 53.88478°N 1.26273°W		Late 18th century	A house, later used for other purposes, in pinkish-brown brick on a stone plinth, with dressings in magnesian limestone and red brick, quoins, a modillion eaves band, and a Welsh slate roof with stone coping and a kneeler on the right. There are three storeys and three bays. Steps with a wrought iron balustrade lead up to the doorway in the left bay, that has an eared architrave, an oblong fanlight, a pulvinated frieze and a triangular pediment. The windows are sashes with flat arches in gauged red brick, and stone keystones.	II
3 Wharfe Bank Terrace; 53.88484°N 1.26079°W		Late 18th century	A house in pinkish-orange brick, with a dentilled eaves band, and a swept pantile roof. There are two storeys and one bay. On the right is a doorway, and the windows are sash windows, the ground floor window with a cambered arch, and the upper floor window with an elliptical arch.	II
The Old Brewery; 53.88384°N 1.26148°W		Late 18th century	A house, later used for other purposes, in pinkish-orange brick on a plinth, with stone dressings, sill bands, a double dentilled cornice and a Welsh slate roof. There are three storeys and three bays. On the centre is a Tuscan portico with a frieze and a cornice, surmounted by a wrought iron emblem, and a doorway with pilasters, an oblong fanlight and side windows. Above are sash windows in architraves. The outer bays contain full height canted bay windows.	II
The Old Sunday School; 53.88484°N 1.26353°W		1788	The former Sunday school is in limewashed stucco on a plinth, with stone dressings, and a hipped Welsh slate roof. There is a single story, with a central block of four bays, and single-bay wings. In the centre are paired round-arched doorways with architraves and radial fanlights, above which are inscribed and dated plaques. Flanking the doorways and at the rear are Venetian windows. The bays contain elliptical-arched doorways, and above them the coping is ramped up and surmounted by a ball finial.	II
10 High Street; 53.88378°N 1.26209°W		Late 18th to early 19th century	The house is in pinkish-orange brick on a plinth, with magnesian limestone dressings, quoins, a sill band, a double dentilled cornice, and a Welsh slate roof. There are three storeys and two bays. On the right bay is a doorway with pilasters, an oblong fanlight, and a hood. To the left is a two-storey canted bay window, and the other windows are sashes, the window in the middle floor with a flat gauged brick arch and a keystone.	II
14 High Street; 53.88370°N 1.26218°W		Late 18th to early 19th century	A house, later a shop, in pinkish-orange brick with stone dressings, cogged eaves and a pantile roof. There are three storeys and three bays. Steps lead up to a doorway between bow windows on plinths, and to the right is a passage door. On the upper floors are sash windows with flat gauged brick arches.	II
16 High Street; 53.88364°N 1.26227°W		Late 18th to early 19th century	A house, later a shop, in pinkish-brown brick with stone dressings, a floor band, a double dentilled eaves cornice, and a Welsh slate roof. There are three storeys and four bays. The left three bays contain a shopfront with a central doorway approached by steps. To the right is a doorway with a round arch, a radial fanlight and a fluted keystone. On the upper floors are sash windows with incised wedge lintels and fluted keystones.	II
32 Kirkgate; 53.88489°N 1.26233°W		Early 19th century	A house, late offices, in pinkish-brown brick on a stone plinth, with sill bands, a double dentilled eaves band, and a Welsh slate roof with stone coping. There are three storeys and four bays, the second and fourth bays canted. The left bay has a carriage arch, and on the third bay is a doorway in a recessed panelled surround, with fluted Doric columns, an oblong fanlight a moulded frieze and a cornice. The windows are sashes, those in the lower two floors with wedge lintels. The canted bays have separate turret roofs with wrought iron finials.	II
11 Wharfe Bank Terrace; 53.88502°N 1.26105°W		Early 19th century	The house is in pinkish-orange brick on a stone plinth, with stone dressings, sill bands, a double dentilled eaves band, and a Welsh slate roof with a stone kneeler and coping on the right. There are two storeys and two bays. The left bay has a doorway with pilasters, an oblong fanlight, and a hood on brackets. To the right is a two-storey canted bay window. The other window is a sash window, and all the windows have wedge lintels.	II
Methodist Church; 53.88331°N 1.26343°W		1828	The building is in magnesian limestone with floor bands and hipped Welsh slate roofs. It consists of a central block with two tall storeys and four bays, flanked by projecting three-storey two-bay wings, the wings later used for other purposes. In the centre is a round-arched doorway with a radial fanlight, and above it is an inscribed plaque. The windows are fixed, with flat arches of voussoirs. On the inner bay of each wing is a round-arched doorway with a radial fanlight, and the windows on the wings are sashes with flat voussoir arches.	II
1 High Street; 53.88375°N 1.26160°W		Early to mid-19th century	The building, at one time the town hall, it is in pinkish-brown brick on a plinth, with stone dressings, a sill band, a continuous band above the middle floor with hood moulds, a cornice, and a pediment containing a plaque. There are three storeys and three bays. On the left of the ground-floor is a carriage arch, and to the right is a canted bay window. Above them is a wrought iron balcony with bars arranged to form crosses, and ornamented with paterae, and over this are three round-arched windows.	II
Tadcaster Viaduct; 53.88854°N 1.26429°W		c. 1846–49	The viaduct was built by the York and North Midland Railway to carry its line over the River Wharfe. It is in magnesian limestone, with dressings in vermiculated millstone grit and orange brick in the soffits. There are eleven arches, the two widest segmental arches over the river, seven over the land to the east and two to the west. The arches over the river have cutwaters that are rounded to the north and flat to the south, the outer cutwaters with paired pilasters. The voussoirs are in millstone grit, and the bridge has a band and a coped parapet.	II
Milestone near junction with Stutton Lane; 53.87025°N 1.30448°W		19th century	The milepost on the northwest side of the A659 road is in stone with a cast iron plaque. It has a triangular plan and a round head, and is about 1 metre (3 ft 3 in) in height. On the head is inscribed "TADCASTER AND HALTONDIAL"and "TURNPIKE ROAD". On the left face is the distance to Tadcaster, and on the right face the distance to Leeds.	II
Milestone near junction with Garnet Lane; 53.87979°N 1.28789°W		19th century	The milepost on the north side of Roman Road (A659 road) is in stone with a cast iron plaque. It has a triangular plan and a round head, and is about 1 metre (3 ft 3 in) in height. On the head is inscribed "TADCASTER AND HALTONDIAL"and "TURNPIKE ROAD". On the left face is the distance to Tadcaster, and on the right face the distance to Leeds.	II
Milestone near junction with Croft Lane; 53.88940°N 1.28132°W		19th century	The milepost on the south side of the A659 road is in stone with a cast iron plaque. It has a triangular plan and a round head, and is about 1 metre (3 ft 3 in) in height. On the head is inscribed "TADCASTER & OTLEY ROAD" and "TADCASTER WEST". On the left face are the distances to Boston, Wetherby, Harewood and Otley, and on the right face to Tadcacster.	II
Milestone at the junction with the A162 road 53.88239°N 1.26559°W		19th century	The milepost at the junction of Leeds Road (A59 road) and the A162 road is in stone with a cast iron plaque. It has an oblong plan and a round head, and is about 1.15 metres (3 ft 9 in) in height. On the head is inscribed "TADCASTER AND HALTONDIAL"and "TURNPIKE ROAD", and below is the distance to Leeds.	II
Milestone near junction with Carnet Lane; 53.88099°N 1.26551°W		19th century	The milepost on the west side of the A162 road is in stone with a cast iron plaque. It has a triangular plan and a round head, and is about 1.5 metres (4 ft 11 in) in height. On the head is inscribed "TADCASTER & DONCASTER ROAD" and "TADCASTER WEST". On the left side are the distances to York and Tadcaster, and on the right side to Doncaster, Pontefract and Ferrybridge.	II
Malt tower and ranges, John Smith's Brewery; 53.88263°N 1.26291°W		1882	The malt tower and adjoining ranges are in rusticated sandstone on a partial plinth, with a Welsh slate roof. The malt tower has seven storeys and five bays, the left range has three storeys and eleven bays, and eight bays with a single storey at the end. The right range has three storeys and 24 bays with eight bays and a single storey at the end. All the windows are casements, with a variety of heads, and some have keystones. In the left bay of the first floor of the malt tower is an oriel window, and at the top is a modillion cornice, and a hipped roof with a glazed attic storey surmounted by a decorative balustrade.	II
Offices, John Smith's Brewery; 53.88303°N 1.26357°W		1883	The office building is in rusticated sandstone, with a floor band, and a Welsh slate roof with moulded coping. There is an L-shaped plan, with the front range consisting of a three-storey three-bay gabled wing, and a block with four storeys and seven bays to the right. The doorway in the wing has pilasters, a frieze and a segmental pediment. The windows are casements, with segmental or flat heads, most with hood moulds, and some with keystones. In the gable of the wing is a clock face, and along the top of the right block is an inscribed plaque, and a raised tablet with pilasters and a pediment containing the date.	II
Chimney, John Smith's Brewery; 53.88286°N 1.26269°W		c. 1883	The chimney is in rusticated sandstone with steel bands. It has an octagonal plan, and is about 65 metres (213 ft) in height. The chimney tapers, and then fans out to the summit, with a cornice, and blind openings under elliptical arches with keystones.	II
Office, walls, piers and gates, John Smith's Brewery; 53.88323°N 1.26270°W		c. 1883	The office at the entrance to the brewery is in rusticated sandstone on a plinth, and consists of a two-storey single-bay office with a single-storey three-bay wing. The windows are a mix of sashes and casements. The associated piers each has a frieze, a cornice and a blocking course. Between the gate piers are wrought iron gates and a decorative overthrow, the latter with the name of the brewery.	II
Walls, gates and piers, John Smith's Brewery; 53.88300°N 1.26371°W		c. 1883	The piers flanking the entrance to the brewery are in sandstone, each has a frieze, a cornice and a blocking course. Between the gate piers are wrought iron gates and a decorative overthrow, the latter with the name of the brewery. They are flanked by coped walls on plinths, the walls extend to the left for 3 metres (9.8 ft) and to the right for 15 metres (49 ft). The left wall contains a pedestrian entrance with a pediment and a gate.	II
Former Barclays Bank; 53.88416°N 1.26129°W		Early 20th century	The former bank is in stone on a plinth, with a sill band and a moulded floor band, and at the top is a frieze, a dentilled cornice, and a balustrade with ball and vase finials. There are two storeys and five bays. All the openings have quoined surrounds, and all the windows are sashes. The central doorway has an architrave, a triglyph frieze, and a segmental pediment containing a carving. The ground floor windows have stepped voussoirs and a Greek key frieze. The windows on the upper floor have aprons with balusters, cornices, pulvinated friezes, alternate segmental and triangular pediments, and tripartite keystones.	II
Telephone kiosk 53.88403°N 1.26179°W		1935	The telephone kiosk in Kirkgate is of the K6 type designed by Giles Gilbert Scott. Constructed in cast iron with a square plan and a dome, it has three unperforated crowns in the top panels.	II
