= The Angel and White Horse =

Listed pub in Tadcaster, North Yorkshire, England

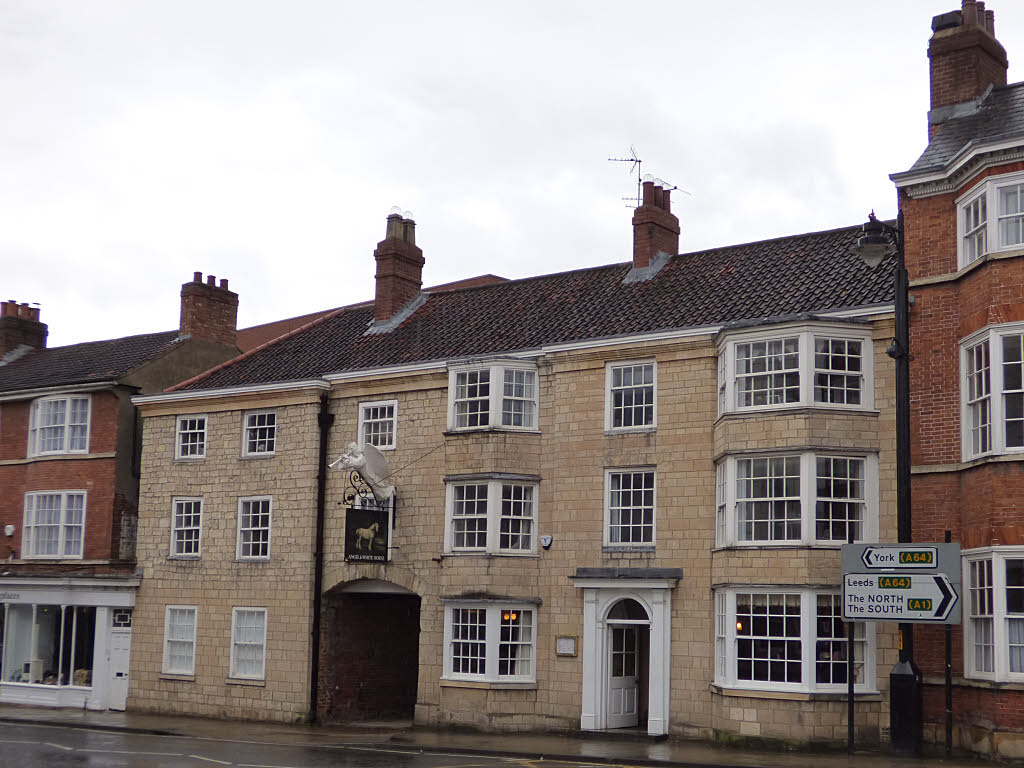
- The pub in 2018

General information
- Type: Public house
- Location: 23 Bridge Street, Tadcaster, North Yorkshire, England
- Coordinates: 53.88394°N 1.26128°W
- Year built: 18th century
- Renovated: Late 20th century (added, restored and partly rebuilt)
- Owner: Samuel Smith's

Design and construction
- Designations

Listed Building – Grade II
- Official name: The Angel and White Horse
- Designated: 12 July 1985
- Reference no.: 1301008

The Angel and White Horse is a public house on Bridge Street in Tadcaster, a town in North Yorkshire, England.

In the Tudor period, the Red Hart inn stood on Bridge Street in Tadcaster. By the Georgian era, it had been rebuilt as The Angel, a coaching inn. In 1855, Albert Denison, 1st Baron Londesborough, purchased the building as part of a deal to establish a hotel next door, in the former White Horse inn. He closed The Angel and converted it into shops.

Samuel Smith Old Brewery lies behind the building. It purchased the property and converted it into its brewery tap, opening in 1977. Its name recalls both the former coaching inn and its neighbour. By the early 21st century, the pub was recognised for its food, and in the early 2010s it was listed in the Good Beer Guide. The building was Grade II listed in 1985.

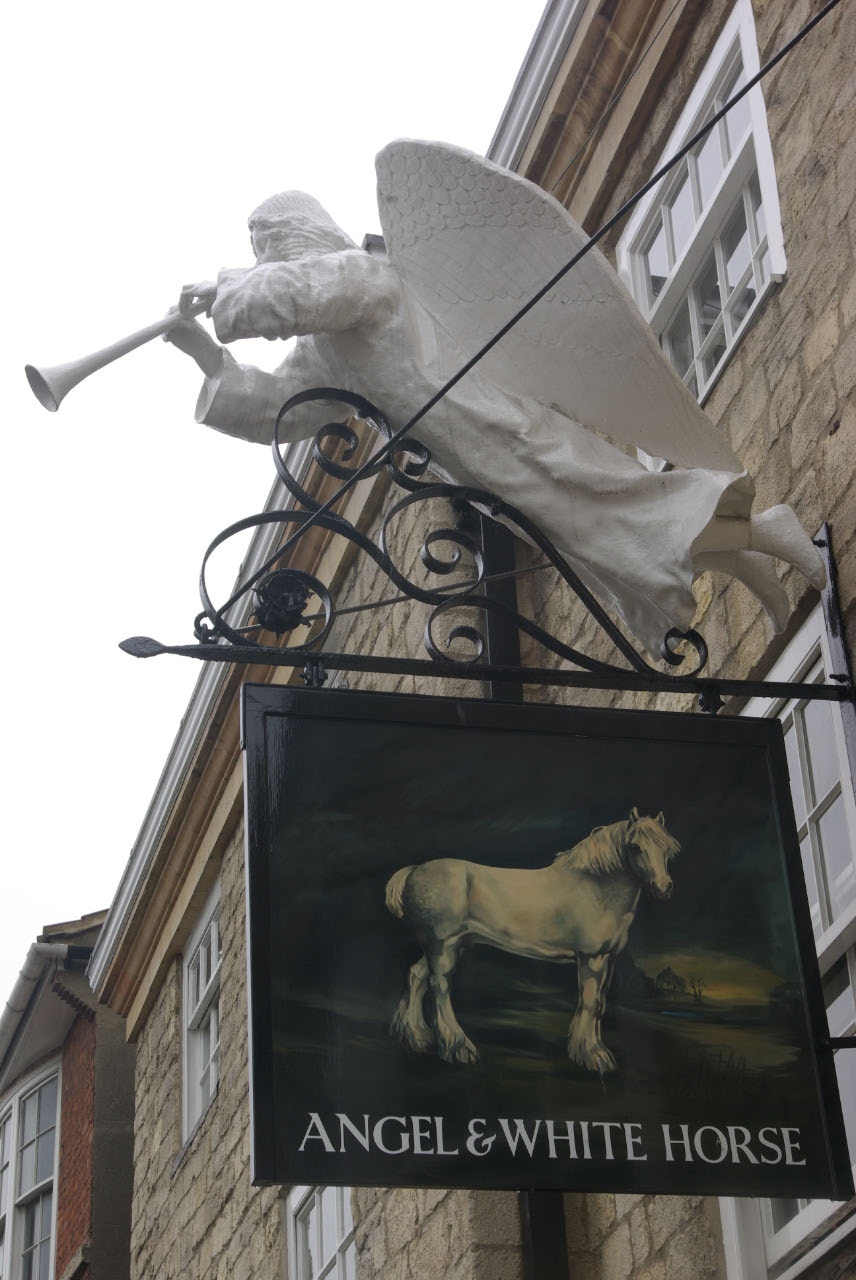
The pub sign

The building is constructed of limestone, with some timber framing and brick. It has three storeys and is six bays wide, with the fifth bay housing a carriage arch and two bays having canted fronts. It retains some Tudor material but is principally 18th century. It has mostly sash windows and a moulded cornice. The lower part of the three left-hand bays has been restored, and the lower part of the other bays has been partly rebuilt. There are late-20th-century additions at the rear, and the entrance is also 20th century.

== See also ==
- Listed buildings in Tadcaster
