= Old Vicarage, Tadcaster =

Listed building in North Yorkshire, England

Coordinates: 53°53′04″N 1°15′47″W

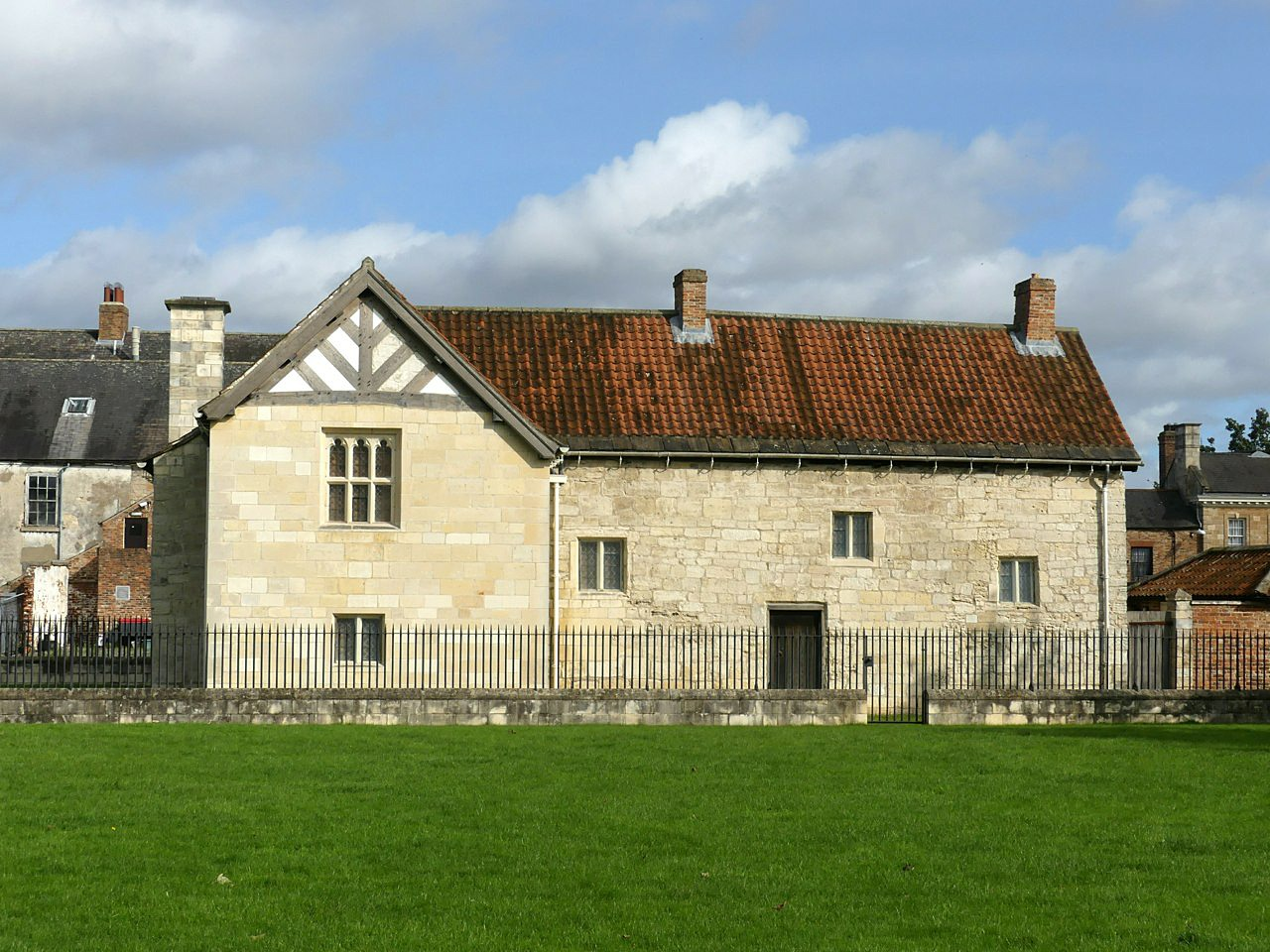
The building, in 2023

The Old Vicarage is a historic building in Tadcaster, North Yorkshire, England.

The building was constructed in the late 13th century, probably as a priest's house. It was rebuilt in about 1500, and has been altered and extended in the 18th, 19th, and 20th centuries. It served for many years as a vicarage, then as a boarding school, and later as the local headquarters of the British Legion. It was Grade II* listed in 1992, and was most recently restored in 1995.

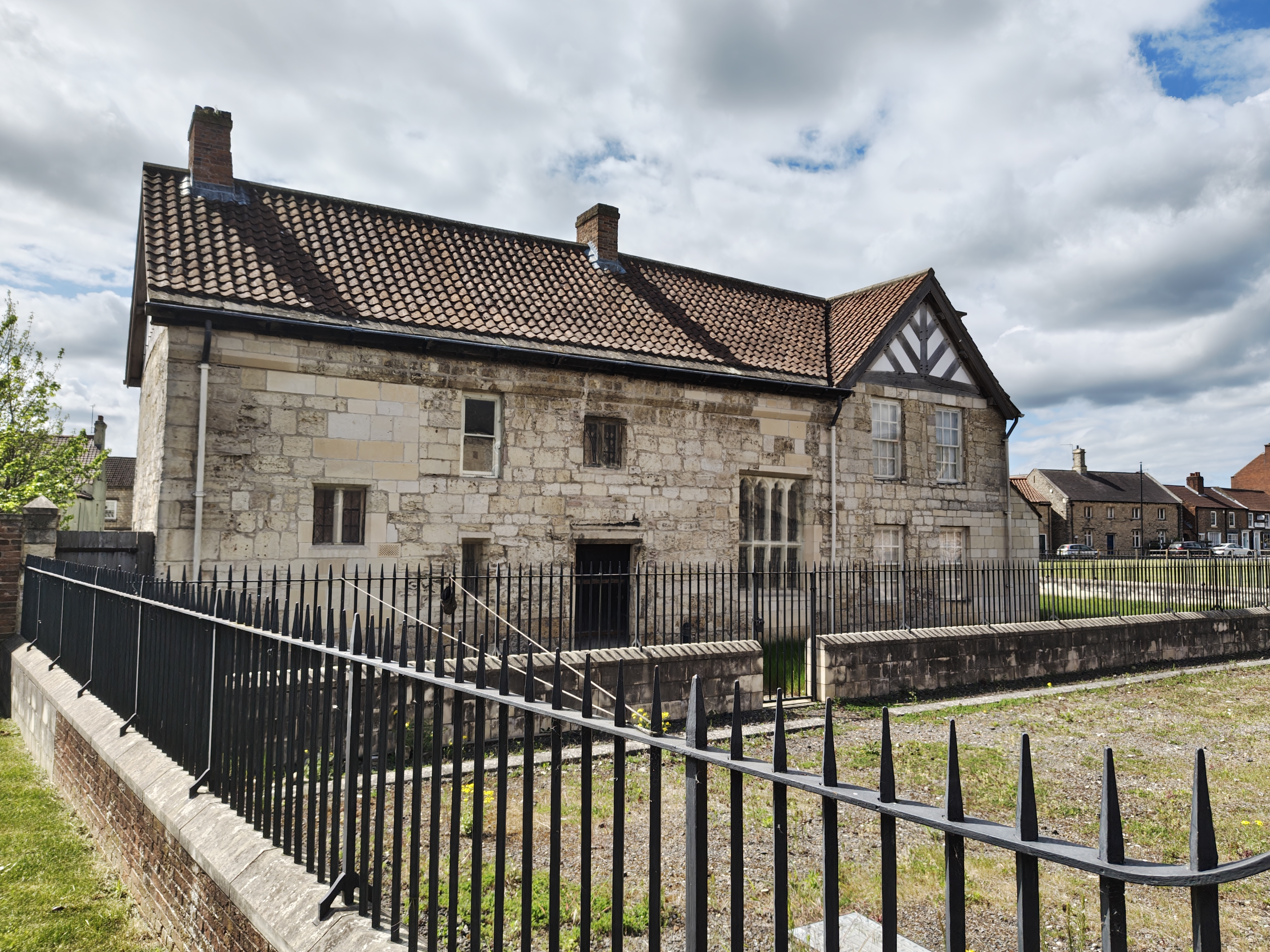
View from the east, in 2025

Samuel Smith's Brewery, which owns a large number of buildings in Tadcaster, purchased the building in the 1990s and undertook a multi-million pound restoration project that exceeded the requirements set by English Heritage. Upon completion of the restoration in 1995, the vicar of St Mary's Church was informed that the Old Vicarage was intended as her new residence. However, the vicar, who already had a home, declined the offer. Consequently, the building has remained uninhabited since its renovation.

The two-storey building is constructed of limestone, infilled in places with brick and breeze blocks. It has a slate roof, with a single gable and a stone chimney. Many of the doors and windows have been blocked over the years, with others created, but early features include a round-headed door on the north-west front. Inside, the former hall was subdivided with stud walls, which survive on the first floor. The roof has a king post structure.

== See also ==
- Grade II* listed buildings in North Yorkshire (district)
- Listed buildings in Tadcaster
