= Old Town Hall, Tadcaster =

Former municipal building in Tadcaster, North Yorkshire, England

Old Town Hall
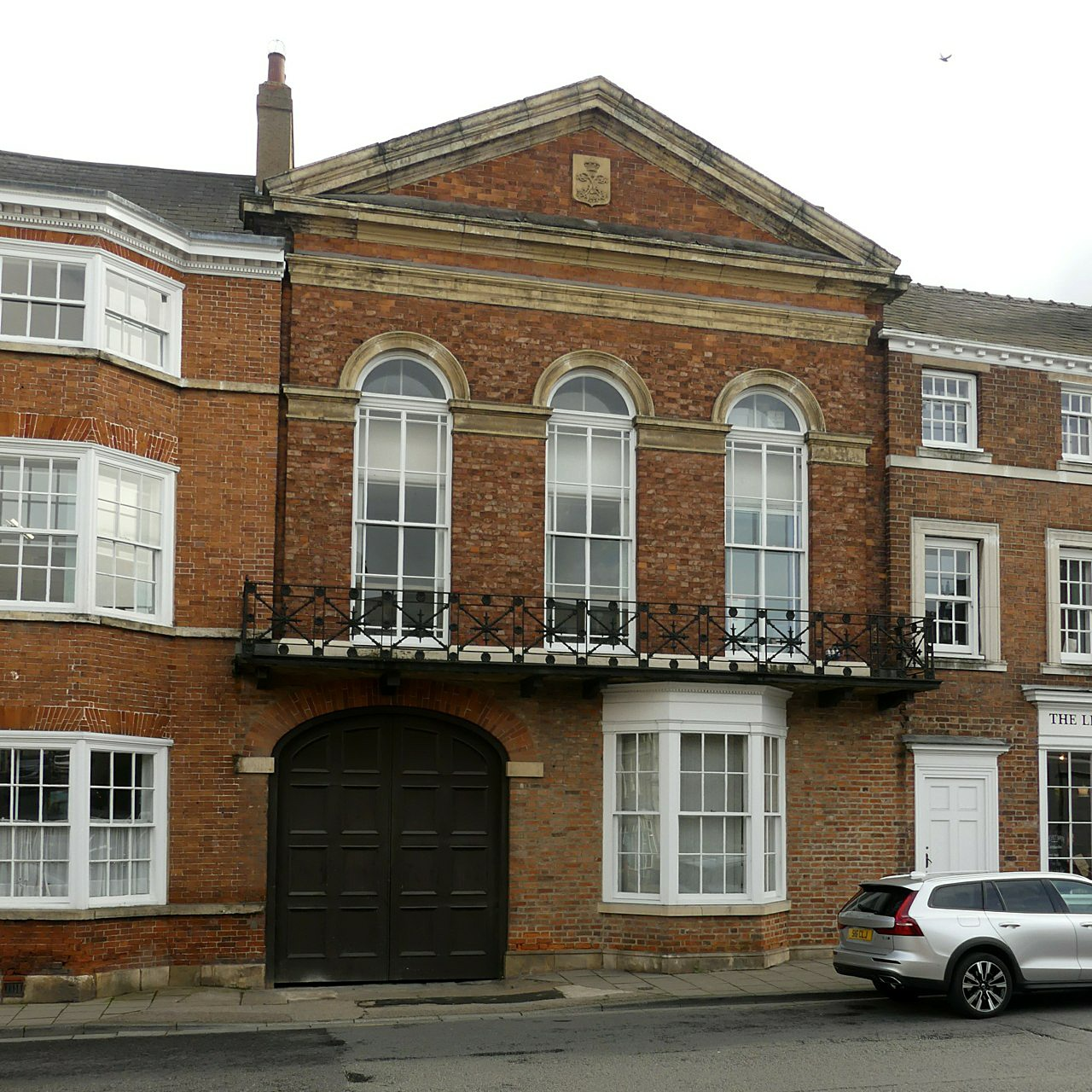
- The building, in 2023

- Shown in North Yorkshire
- 53.8838°N 1.2615°W
- Location: High Street, Tadcaster

History
- Built: 1860

Site notes
- Architectural style: Neoclassical style

Listed Building – Grade II
- Official name: 1 High Street
- Designated: 12 July 1985
- Reference no.: 1316684

The Old Town Hall, also known as 1 High Street, is a former municipal building and historic building in the High Street, Tadcaster, North Yorkshire, England. The structure, which now forms part of the headquarters of Samuel Smith's Brewery, is a grade II listed building.

== History ==
After acquiring the Manor of Tadcaster from George Wyndham, 3rd Earl of Egremont in 1855, Albert Denison, 1st Baron Londesborough, who was a politician and horse racing enthusiast, set about making various improvements to his estate for the benefit of the local people. One of these improvements was a proposed town hall. The site he selected was immediately to the southwest to an old public house, The White Horse, which as part of his improvements, he converted into a hotel for his horse racing guests.

The new building was designed in the neoclassical style, built in red brick with stone dressings and was completed in 1860. His successor, William Denison, 1st Earl of Londesborough got into financial difficulties and sold the Tadcaster estate, including the town hall, in 1873. The building remained an important venue for community events and the balcony was the place where the parliamentary election results for Barkston Ash were announced. Petty session hearings were also held in the building on a fortnightly basis, and county court hearings were held there on a bi-monthly basis.

In the early 20th century, the first floor of the building became the Cosy Picture House cinema, which operated until 1938. After the Londesborough Arms, Tadcaster hotel closed in the early 1970s, both the hotel and the town hall were acquired in 1976 for use as the head office of Samuel Smith Old Brewery. The building was grade II listed in 1985.

== Architecture ==
The three-storey building is built of brick, with stone dressings. Its roof is slate, and it has a first-floor balcony constructed of wrought iron. The ground floor has been replaced, and it now has a carriage entrance with wooden doors at the left-hand side, and then a 20th-century bay window to the right. The first floor has tall round-headed windows, which extend up to the second floor, above which there is a pediment, with a plaque depicting a shield. Inside, the original 19th century staircase survives.

== See also ==
- Listed buildings in Tadcaster
