= Tadcaster =

Town in North Yorkshire, England

Coordinates: 53.8852°N 1.2620°W

- Town and civil parish
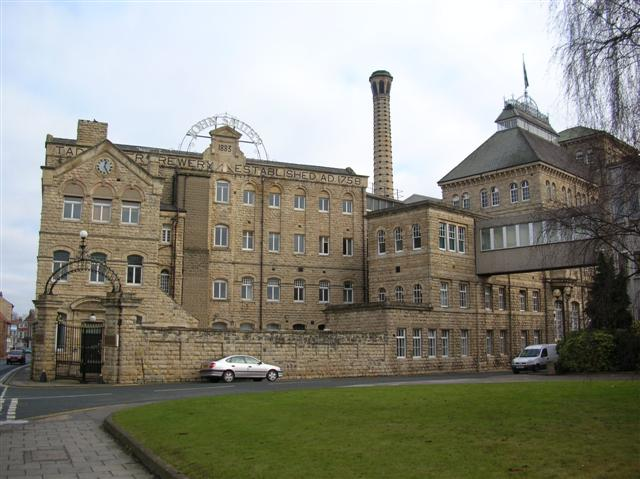
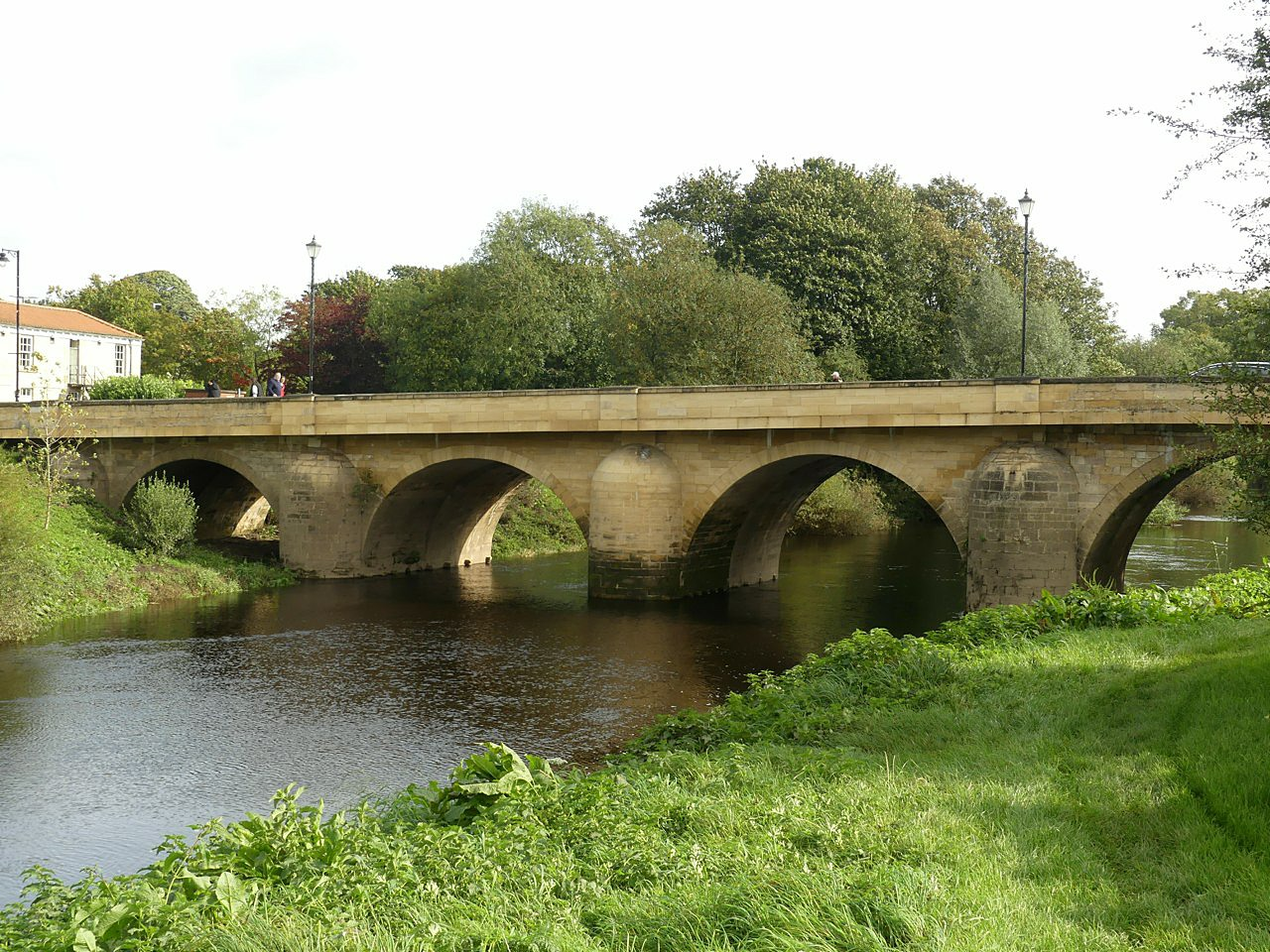
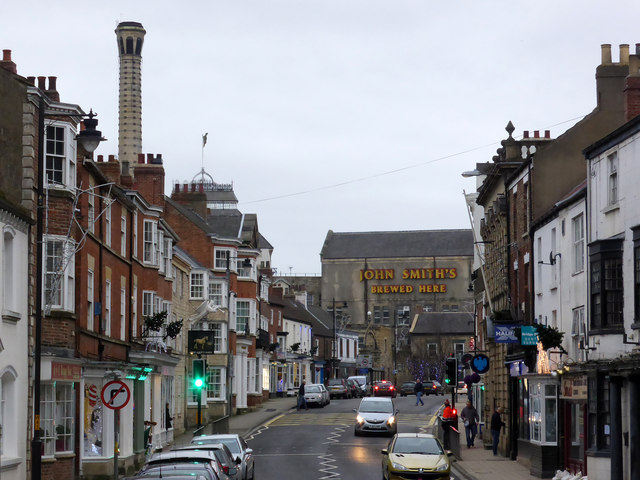
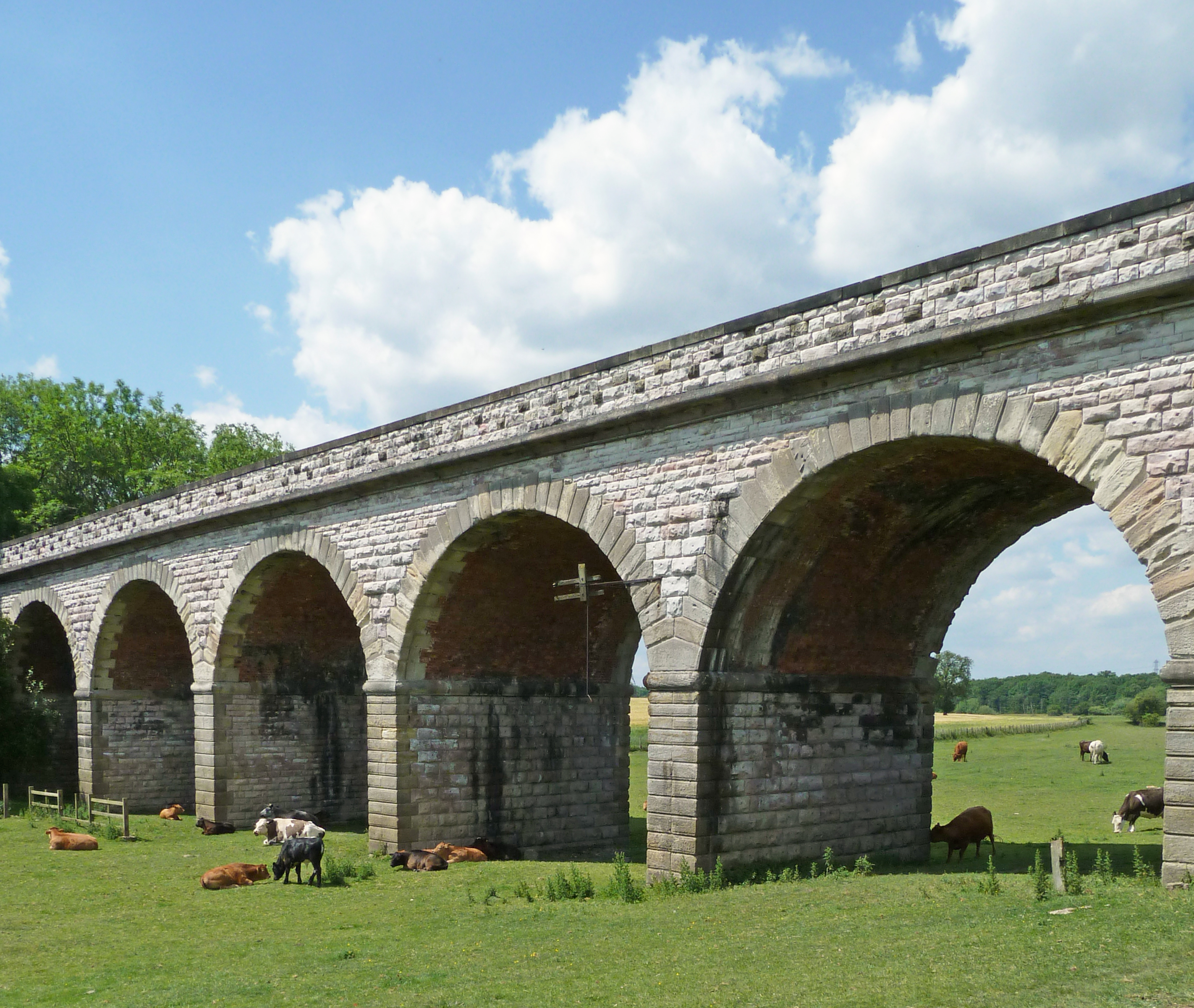
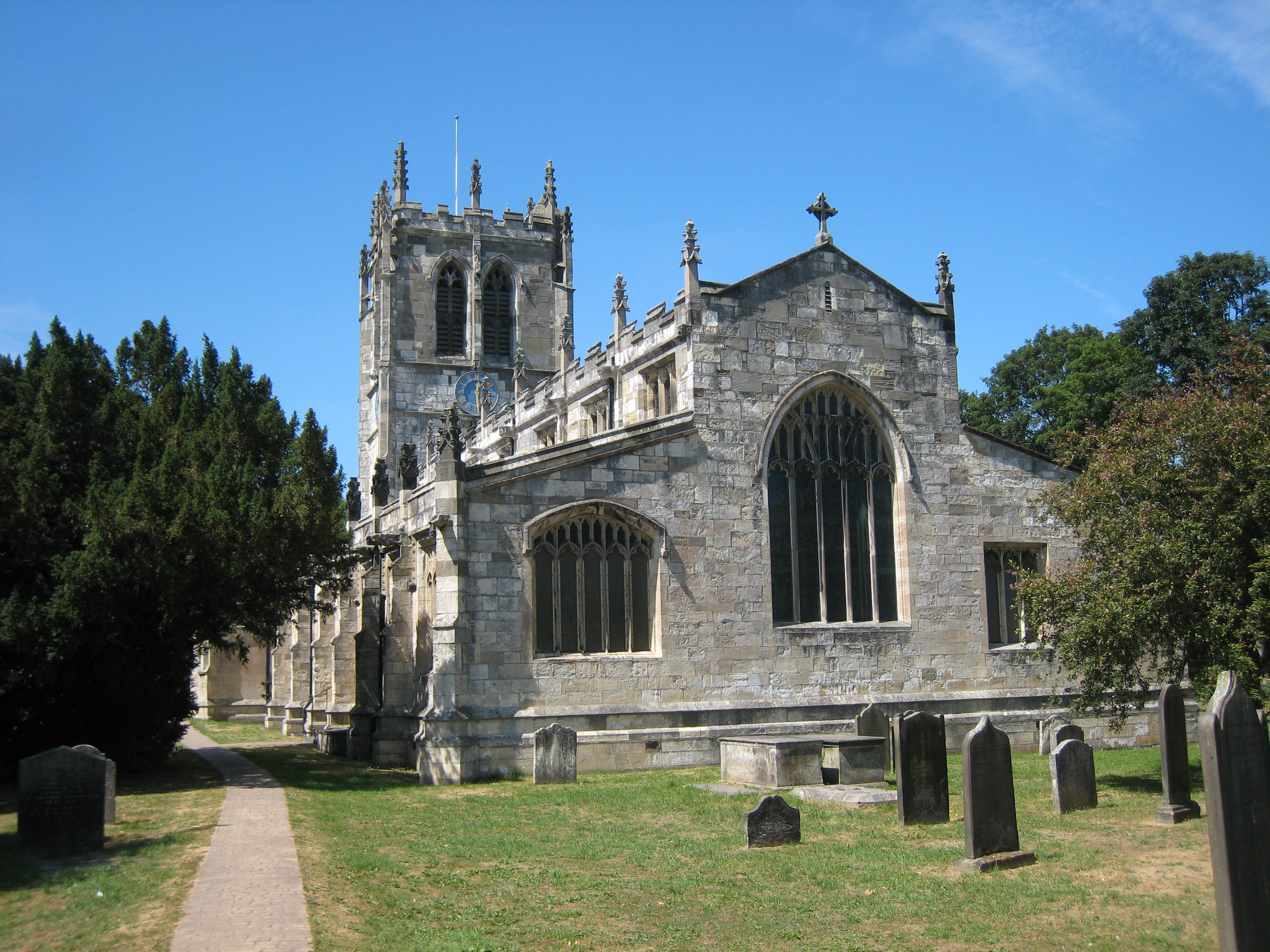
- John Smith's Tadcaster Bridge Tadcaster High Street Tadcaster Viaduct St Mary's Church

- Location within North Yorkshire
- Population: 6,426 (2021 census)
- OS grid reference: SE4843
  - London: 170 mi (270 km) SSE
- Civil parish: Tadcaster
- Unitary authority: North Yorkshire
- Ceremonial county: North Yorkshire
- Region: Yorkshire and the Humber
- Country: England
- Sovereign state: United Kingdom
- Post town: TADCASTER
- Postcode district: LS24
- Dialling code: 01937
- Police: North Yorkshire
- Fire: North Yorkshire
- Ambulance: Yorkshire
- UK Parliament: Wetherby and Easingwold

Tadcaster is a market town and civil parish in North Yorkshire, England, 15 miles (24 km) north-east of Leeds and 10 miles (16 km) south-west of York.

Its historical importance from Roman times onward was largely as the lowest road crossing-point on the River Wharfe until the construction of the A64 Tadcaster by-pass some 660 yards (600 m) to the south, in 1978. There are two rail crossings downstream of the town before the Wharfe joins the River Ouse near Cawood. Thanks to its position on the banks of the River Wharfe parts of the town adjacent to the bridge are prone to flooding.

The town was part of the West Riding of Yorkshire until 1974, but is now part of North Yorkshire. Tadcaster is twinned with Saint-Chély-d'Apcher in France.

== History ==
=== Roman ===
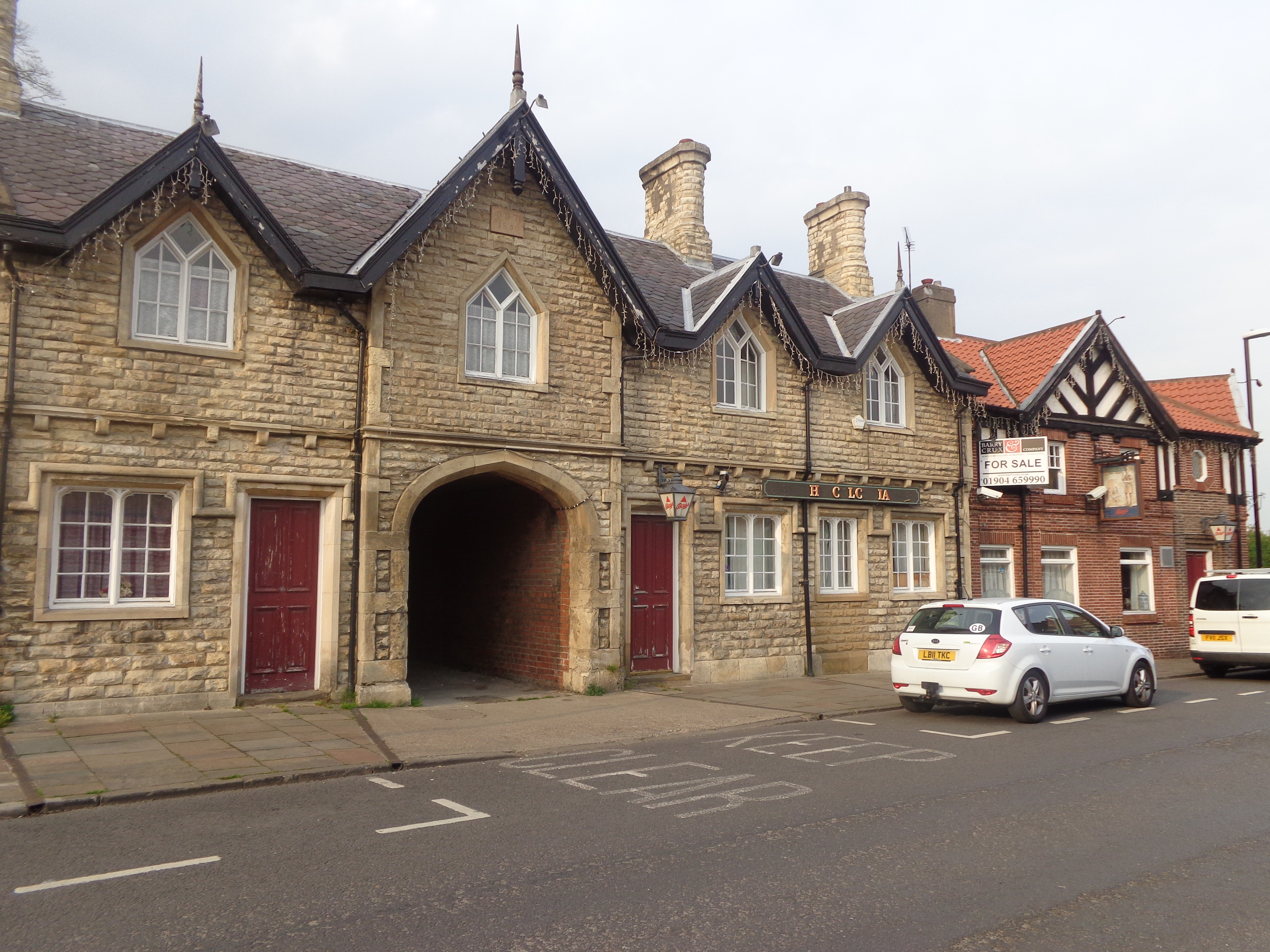
The Calcaria public house, the namesake of Calcaria

The Romans built a settlement and named it Calcaria from the Latin word for lime, reflecting the importance of the area's limestone geology as a natural resource for quarrying, an industry which continues and has contributed to many notable buildings including York Minster. Calcaria was an important staging post that grew at the crossing of the River Wharfe on the road to Eboracum (York).

=== Anglo-Saxon and medieval ===
The suffix of the Anglo-Saxon name Tadcaster is derived from the borrowed Latin word castra meaning 'military camp' (the plural of castrum, fort), although the Angles and Saxons used the term for any walled Roman settlement. Tadcaster is first mentioned in the Anglo-Saxon Chronicle, where it appears as Táda, referring to the place where King Harold assembled his army and fleet before entering York and proceeding onwards to the Battle of Stamford Bridge in 1066. The place-name probably means 'Tata's fort' after an unknown Anglo-Saxon landowner.

The town is mentioned in the Domesday Book of 1086 as "Tatecastre". The record reads:

Two Manors. In Tatecastre, Dunstan and Turchil had eight carucates of land for geld, where four ploughs may be. Now, William de Parci has three ploughs and 19 villanes and 11 bordars having four ploughs, and two mills of ten shillings (annual value). Sixteen acres of meadow are there. The whole manors, five quaranteens in length, and five in breadth. In King Edward's time they were worth forty shillings; now one hundred shillings.

In the 11th century William de Percy established a motte-and-bailey fortress re-using Roman stone. The earthwork remains of this castle, including the motte (known as Castle Hill) can still be seen adjacent to the parish church and bridge. The castle was abandoned in the early-12th century and was briefly re-fortified with cannon emplacements during the Civil War. The street plan south of the site reflects the shape of the former bailey.

Before 1186, Matilda de Percy, the wife of William de Beaumont, 3rd Earl of Warwick gave the hospital here to Sawley Abbey (now in Lancashire, previously in West Yorkshire).

The original river-crossing was probably a ford near the current bridge, followed by a wooden bridge. Around 1240, the first stone bridge was constructed, possibly from stone reclaimed from the castle. The current bridge was constructed on the foundations of the original (1699), although it has been substantially modified in 1736 and 1753. Then in 1791, John Carr built another bridge immediately above the 1699 bridge effectively extending it to twice the width it was before. Historically, the Wharfe marked the boundary between the West Riding and the Ainsty of York.

=== Civil War ===
During the English Civil War, on the morning of Tuesday 7 December 1642 the Battle of Tadcaster, a skirmish, between Sir Thomas Fairfax's Parliamentarian forces and Sir Thomas Glemham's Royalist army took place on and around Tadcaster Bridge.

=== Market ===
A market has been held since 1270, when Henry de Percy obtained a royal charter from King Henry III to hold "a market and fair at his manor of Tadcaster". The ancient market place is at the junction of Kirkgate and Bridge Street. A stone base, believed to have been part of the original market cross, stood on Westgate where the Tadcaster War Memorial now stands. The present-day market is held on Thursdays in the car park of Tadcaster Social Club on St Josephs Street.

== Population ==
Populations of Tadcaster West and East 1831–2011
Area	1831	1841	1851	1861	1871	1881	1891	1901	1911	1921	1931	1951	1961	1971	2001	2011
West	1,666	1,826	1,693	1,646	1,561	1,560	1,714	1,909	2,103	2,078	2,317	2,384	2,315	3,118	3,830	3,440
East	737	867	834	920	882	869	1,098	1,134	1,296	1,426	1,370	2,018	2,068	2,149	3,830	3,821

Population of Tadcaster 2015–
2015 (estimated)	2021
6,000	6,350

== Governance ==
Tadcaster Town Council

Type
- Type: Town Council

Leadership
- Mayor: Richard Sweeting
- Town clerk: Jane Crowther

Structure
- Seats: 12 Councillors
- Independent: 7 / 12
- Labour: 3 / 13
- Conservative: 2 / 12

Elections
- Voting system: Plurality-at-large
- Last election: 2 May 2023
- Next election: 1 May 2027

Meeting place
- The Ark, Tadcaster

Website
- tadcastertowncouncil.gov.uk

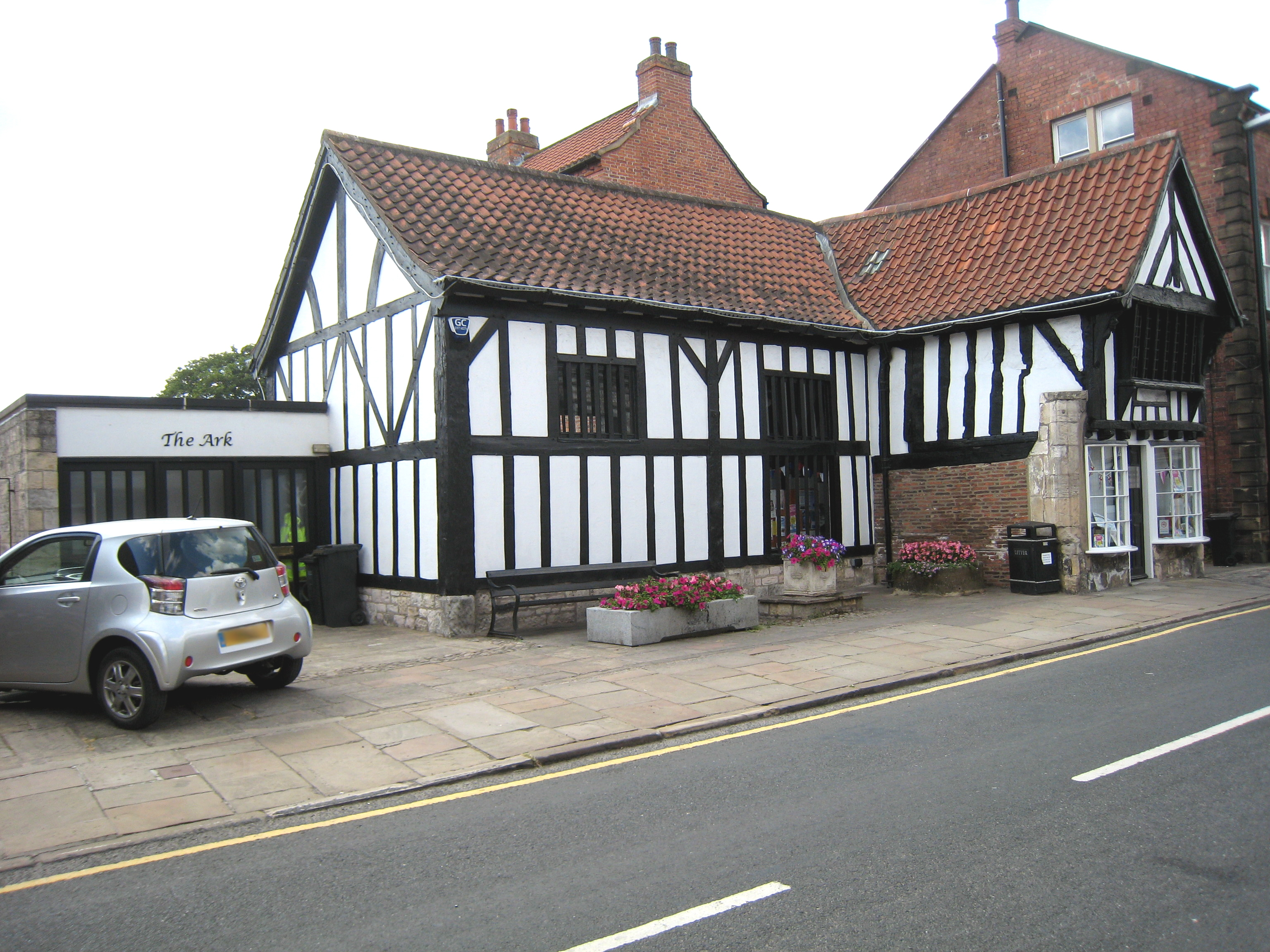
The Ark - Tadcaster Town Council office

For local government purposes, the town is represented as one electoral division. However, until 2015, the River Wharfe divided the town into eastern and western electoral wards. The town was represented at Westminster as part of the Selby & Ainsty constituency until 2024. Following the 2023 Periodic Review of Westminster constituencies it became part of the Wetherby and Easingwold constituency formed for the 2024 general election.

The combined population of Tadcaster East and Tadcaster West in 2003 was 7,341: 3,830 in Tadcaster East and 3,511 in Tadcaster West. At the 2021 census, it was estimated that over 6,300 people were in the combined ward of Tadcaster. The local authority is North Yorkshire Council. Historically, the parish of Tadcaster was in the wapentake of Barkston Ash, and the wapentake known as The Ainsty, in the West Riding of Yorkshire. It was moved into North Yorkshire in 1974. Between 1974 and 2023 it was part of the Selby District.

Tadcaster gave its name to a much larger rural district council, Tadcaster Rural District and other administrative areas. This may lead to confusion when comparing the size and extent of the current town with information for earlier periods. For example, the population in 1911 of the Tadcaster sub-district was 6,831 compared with that of the Tadcaster Registration District, 33,052. The motto of the old Tadcaster Rural District Council was "by service let us govern".

Tadcaster also elects a mayor on an annual basis.

== Economy ==
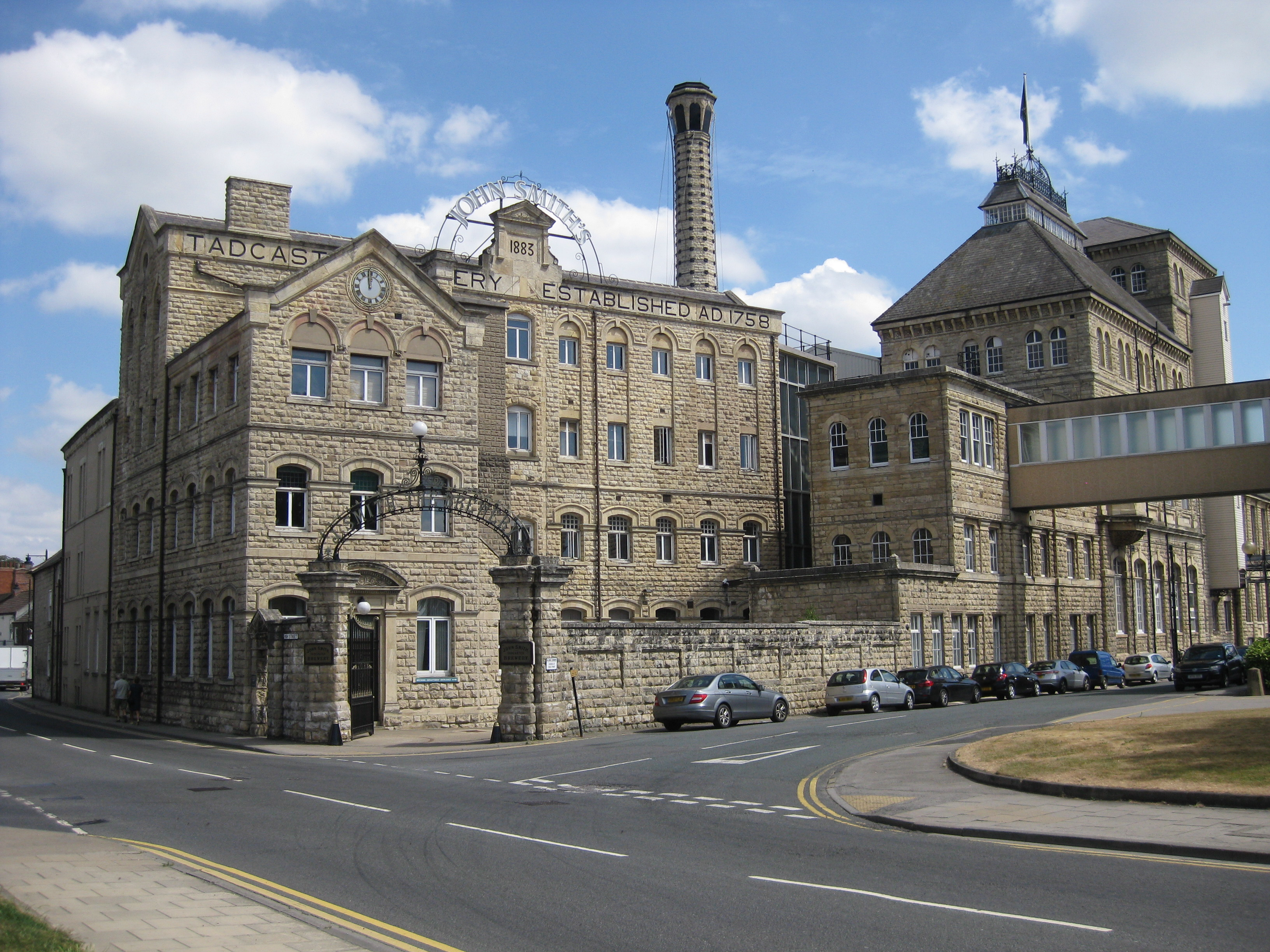
John Smith's Brewery Tadcaster

Tadcaster has a long association with the brewing industry because of the quality and accessibility of the local water, which is rich in lime sulphate after filtering through Permian limestone. In the right conditions freshwater springs, known locally as popple-wells, still bubble up near St Mary's church in the town. Tax registers from 1341 record the presence of two breweries or brewhouses in the town, one paying 8d in tax and the other 4d. Today Tadcaster is renowned for its brewing industry and is known as The Burton of the North (after Burton upon Trent, an English brewing centre).

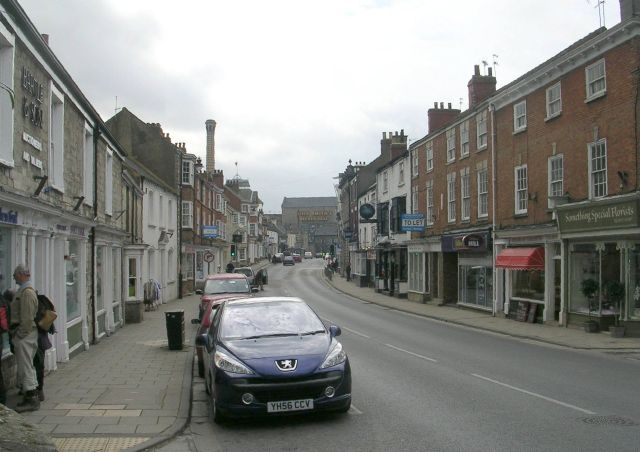
Bridge Street (Tadcaster centre)

Currently there are three breweries in the town: The Tower Brewery (Coors, formerly Bass), John Smith's and Samuel Smith Old Brewery, which is the oldest brewery in Yorkshire and only remaining independent brewery in Tadcaster. A fourth brewery, Braimes, used to stand by the river on the site of the present central car park.

Despite these large commercial enterprises, Tadcaster exhibits many signs of urban decline, with a large number of empty and derelict properties in the town centre. In part this can be attributed to disputes between the owner of the Samuel Smith's brewery, Humphrey Smith, who is a major landowner in the town, and Selby District Council. There are no major tourist attractions in the town, which has one supermarket and no bank. The closure of the railway station (1964), the reduction of the market and the construction of the A64 Tadcaster bypass (1978), whilst substantially reducing traffic using the Tadcaster Bridge, have all contributed to the decline of footfall and therefore of retailing in the town.

== Culture and community ==
Local newspapers covering Tadcaster include The Press and the Wetherby News. The major regional newspaper in the area is The Yorkshire Post.

The local BBC radio station is Radio York, and commercial stations include Greatest Hits Radio York and North Yorkshire and Capital Yorkshire.

Local TV coverage is provided by BBC Yorkshire and ITV Yorkshire from the Emley Moor TV transmitter.

A leisure centre on Station Road provides for a variety of sport activities, and is the base for private sports clubs and a physiotherapy clinic.

Tadcaster's community swimming pool, which includes a fitness suite, opened in December 1994; run as a charity. At the end of 2007 the pool underwent repairs costing £130,000, reopening in 2008; some fundraising was through a celebrity football match, one side of which was formed from cast in television soap Emmerdale.

The route of Ebor Way, a long-distance walk from Helmsley to Ilkley, passes through the town.

Tadcaster pudding, a variety of rich fruit pudding first recorded in the 16th century, is traditional to the town.

Tadcaster is twinned with the town of Saint-Chély-d'Apcher in the Lozère department of southern France.

== Landmarks ==
=== Breweries ===
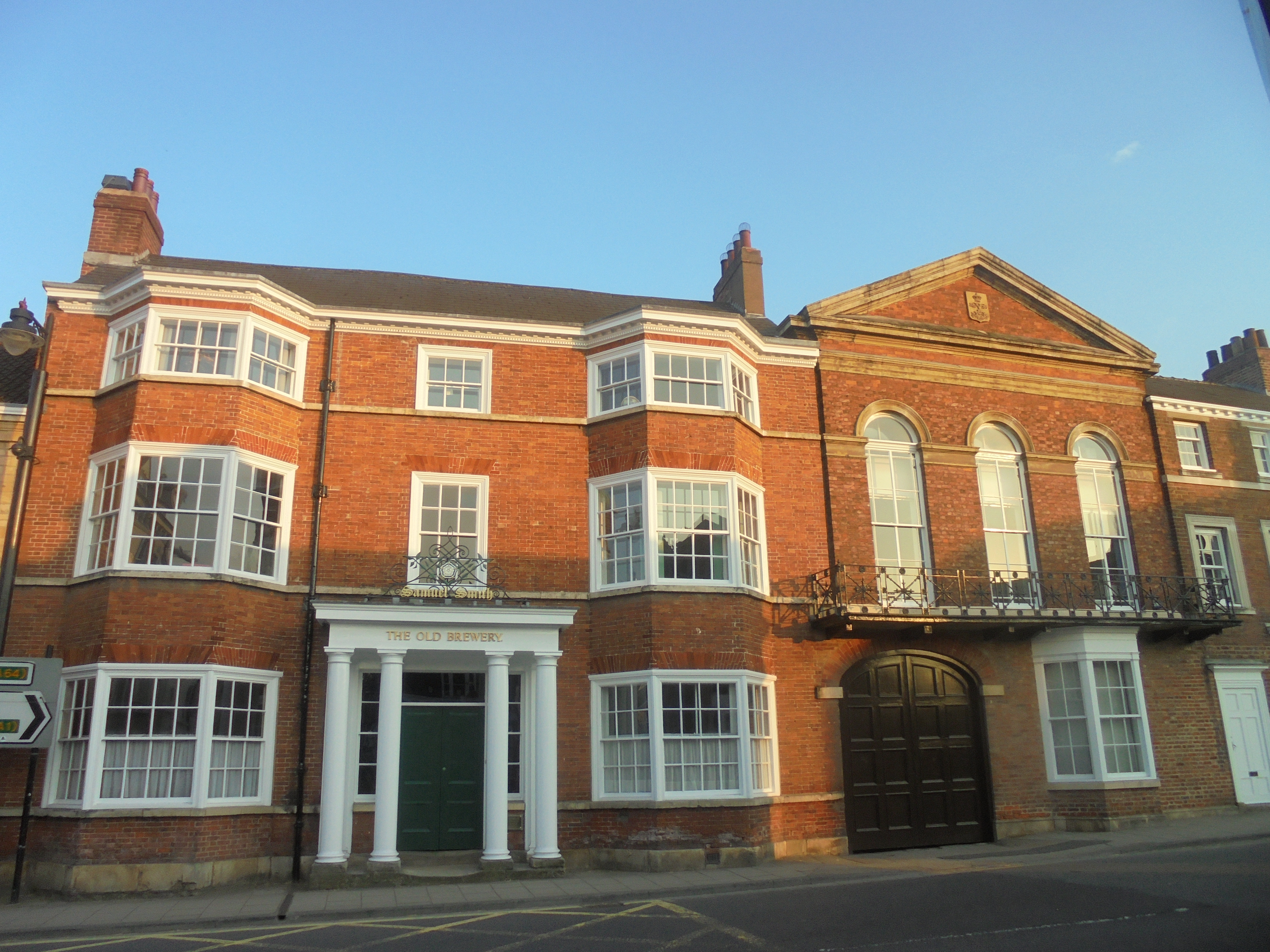
The head office of Samuel Smith Old Brewery, formerly the Londesborough Arms (on the left) and the Old Town Hall (on the right)

The colossal Tadcaster (John Smith's) Brewery (1883, with later additions), a notable example of Victorian industrial architecture, stands on the site of John Smith's earlier brewery at the southern end of the High Street. The tall stone chimney and ornate wrought-iron atrium are prominent features and are listed (protected) structures.

Adjacent to these, across the narrow New Street, are the more modest Georgian headquarters of Samuel Smith's Brewery, with a handsome frontage on the High Street (formerly the Londesborough Arms and the Old Town Hall), and the brewery tap, The Angel and White Horse.

=== The Ark ===
The oldest building in active use in the town besides the parish church and Old Vicarage, is the half-timbered building on Kirkgate known as The Ark, built in the late 15th century, although it has been enlarged and altered many times since. Two carved heads on its front are thought to represent Noah and his wife, hence the name. The Ark has been a meeting place, a post office, an inn, a butcher's shop, a private house and a museum; it is currently the Town Council offices. In the 17th century it was known as Morley Hall, and was licensed for Presbyterian meetings. Some of the so-called Pilgrim Fathers are reputed to have planned their voyage to America in the building; an exact replica exists in Ohio, US.

=== Viaduct ===
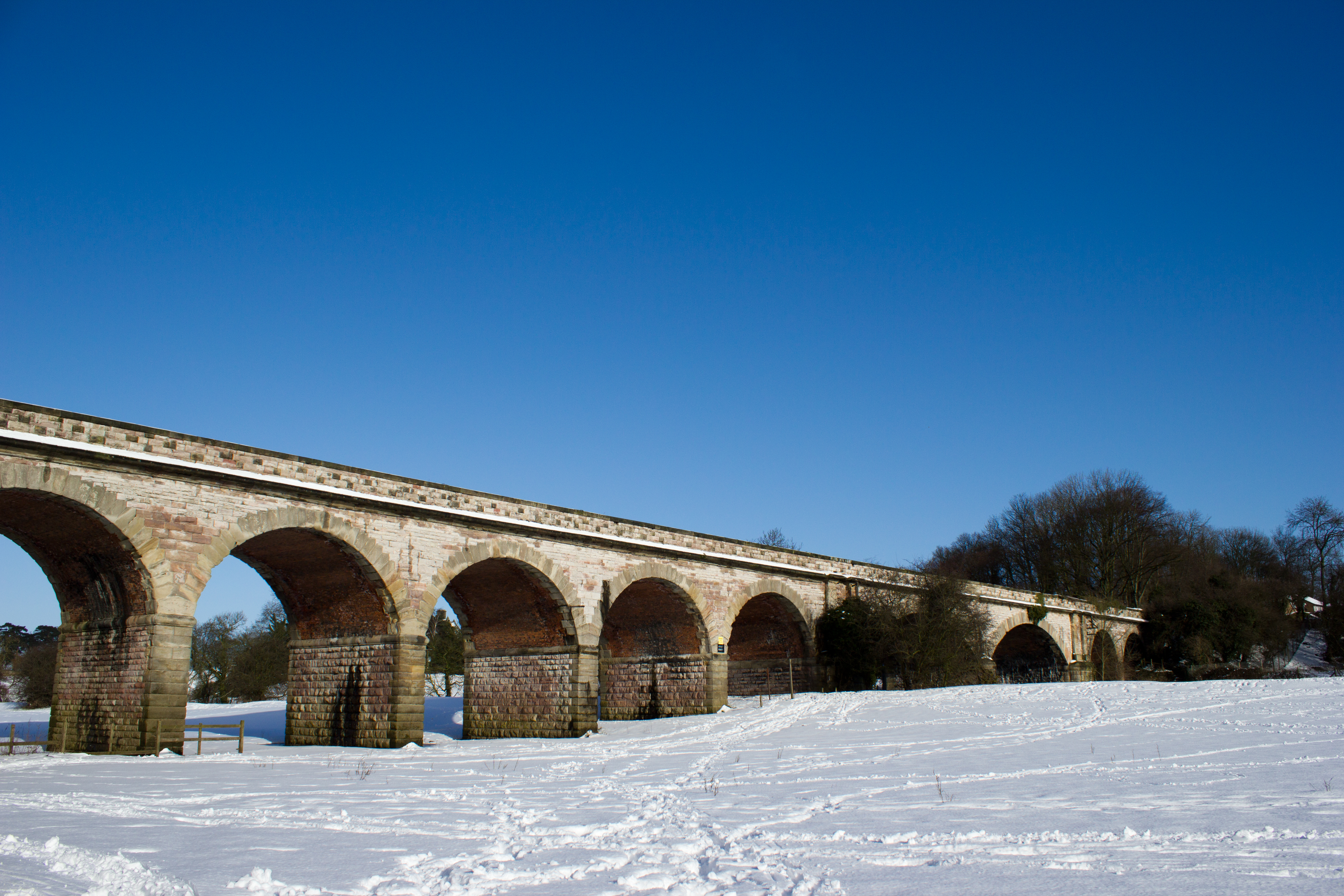
Tadcaster Viaduct

The eleven-arch Tadcaster railway viaduct is 1/4-mile (400 m) above the Wharfe bridge; it was built as part of a projected York and North Midland Railway (Leeds Extension) line from Leeds to York. Construction of the line was authorised in 1846, and much of the northern section including the viaduct had been completed when the collapse of railway investment in 1849 led to its abandonment. Between 1883 and 1959 the viaduct carried a short branchline servicing a corn mill on the east side of the River Wharfe (Mill Lane area). The viaduct is a Grade II listed building owned by Tadcaster Town Council.

=== Bridge ===
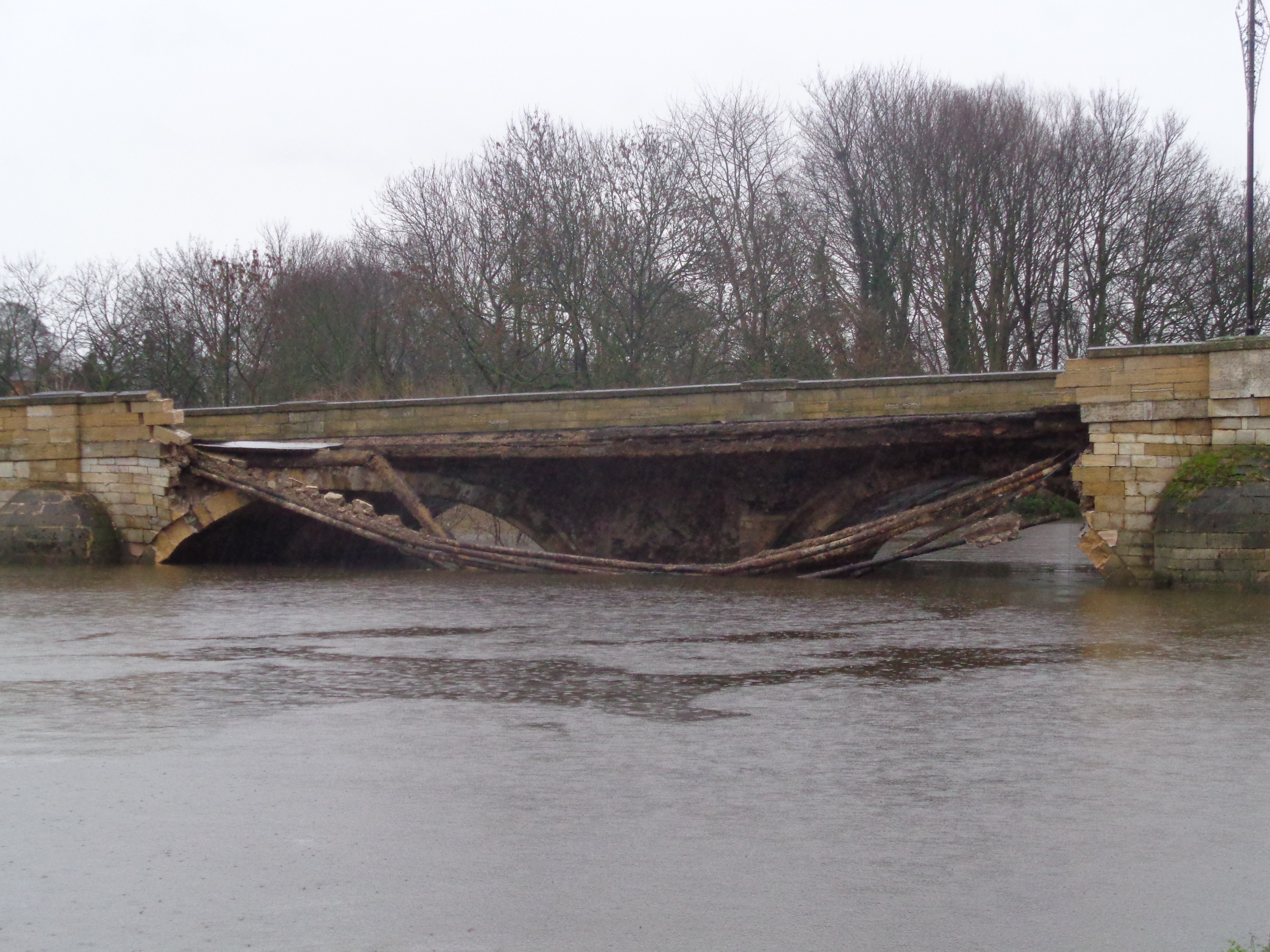
Bridge, partially collapsed after Storm Eva in 2015

The current bridge dates back to the early 1700s and was built, according to Pevsner, using stone from the ruined Castle. It was widened in the C19th. It is the main transport route connecting the town centre, which is divided by the river, and one of the town's two road crossings, the other being the A64 bypass bridge. The bridge partially collapsed on 29 December 2015, following flooding. The collapse fractured a gas main and prompted the evacuation of hundreds of residents and divided the town in two. In early 2016, Historic England carried out an assessment of the significance of the Grade-II listed bridge to inform its restoration. The bridge was then repaired and widened, and re-opened to traffic on 3 February 2017. The area around the bridge, including the north end of the High Street, the houses in Wharfe Terrace, the Bus Station and the Tadcaster Medical Centre, was flooded once again in February 2022.

=== Tadcaster Mere ===
To the south east of the town centre, towards the village of Oxton, lies Tadcaster Mere. Designated a Site of Special Scientific Interest (SSSI) in 1987, the mere is at the centre of a former lake basin that extended over an area of about 740 acres (3 km^{2}). It was formed during the most recent or Devensian ice age, which ended 10,000 years ago, when Tadcaster was at the southernmost limit of glaciation, by the long, low embankment of debris known as the Escrick Moraine, which is composed of debris left behind by the Vale of York Glacier. The mere is a site of current palaeontological interest, as it is believed to be the site of the earliest discovery of the plesiosaur; while unproven, the skeletal fragments found in Tadcaster match the age of those found elsewhere.

Scientific analysis of the mere, in particular sedimentary pollen studies, provides insight into the geological history and makeup of the local environment and allows accurate dating of events before, during and after the Devensian ice age.

== Religion ==
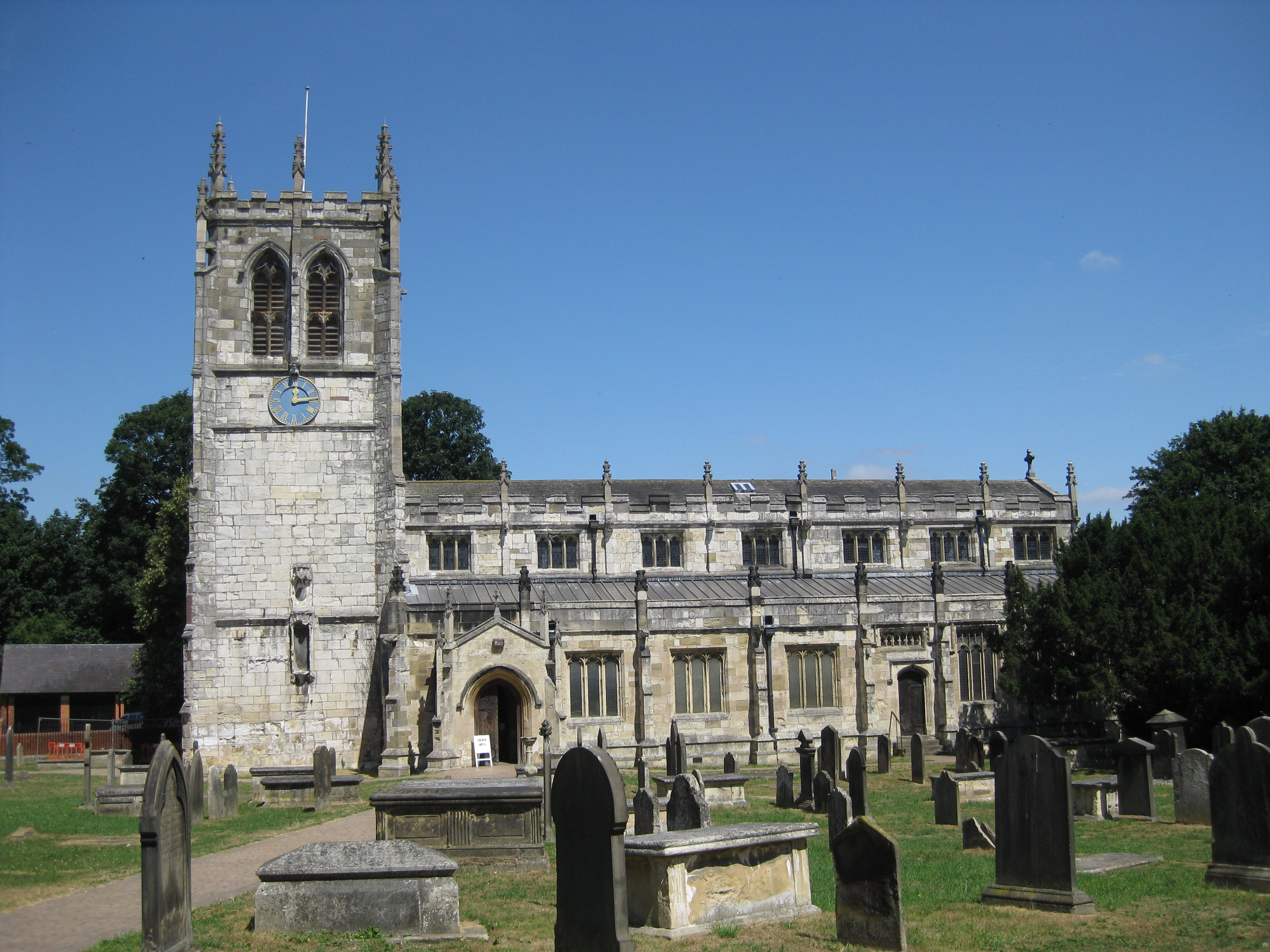
Church of St Mary the Virgin

St Mary's Church, on the banks of the Wharfe, was founded around 1150. It was destroyed by the Scots in one of many incursions after the Battle of Bannockburn in 1314. St Mary's was rebuilt between the 14th and 15th centuries. Due to repeated flooding, it was dismantled and reconstructed between 1875 and 1877 on foundations raised by 5 feet (1.5 m), though the tower was left untouched. £8,426 4s 6½d was raised by public subscription for this renovation. In 1897 a new north aisle was added.

At the other end of the High Street, facing the Tadcaster Brewery (i.e. the John Smith's brewery) is a large Methodist chapel of 1815, extremely plain in style, forming the central section, set slightly back, of a three-part symmetrical facade.

== Transport ==
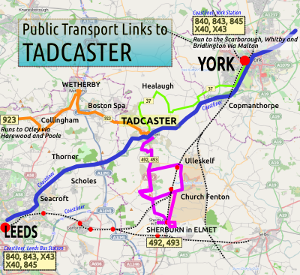
A small map of public transport routes to/from Tadcaster in March 2014

Tadcaster is served by local bus services operating from Leeds City bus station. The town is a stop on the Yorkshire Coastliner service, which accesses the Yorkshire Coast. Buses also run to Wetherby and Harrogate and to Sherburn-in-Elmet. On Mondays a bus service runs to and from Selby.

Tadcaster railway station on the Church Fenton to Harrogate line closed to passengers in January 1964. The nearest railway stations are Ulleskelf, Church Fenton and York railway station which has a wider range of services and is connected to Tadcaster by the Yorkshire Coastliner bus service.

Tadcaster lies on the A64, A659 and A162 main roads, and is about 3 miles (5 km) east of the A1(M) (Junction 44).

== Education ==
Tadcaster has three primary schools (serving ages 5–11) and a secondary school (ages 11–18). In the summer 1999 league tables, Tadcaster Grammar School students obtained the best A Level results in the country for a state comprehensive school.

== Sport ==
Tadcaster has two main football teams, Tadcaster Albion of the Northern Counties East League Premier Division and Tadcaster Magnets, Tadcaster Rugby Football Club, Tadcaster Harriers running club and Cyclesense Cycling Club. Tadcaster Tornadoes Basketball Team play in the Leeds Basketball League (Men's). Tadcaster has a swimming team for young people up to the age of 18. (Tadcaster Swim Squad).

== Notable people ==
- David Brown, footballer
- Jan Dalibor, co-creator of the children's TV puppets Pinky and Perky, worked as a quarryman at Tadcaster after his arrival as a refugee from Czechoslovakia.
- Joseph Entwisle, Methodist minister
- Charles Hague, composer
- Alison Lloyd, fashion designer and founder of Ally Cappelino
- Owen Oglethorpe, Bishop of Carlisle who crowned Queen Elizabeth I in 1559
- Humphrey Smith, brewer
- Adelle Stripe, author and journalist, grew up in Tadcaster
