= The Ark (Tadcaster) =

Historic building in North Yorkshire, England

Coordinates: 53°53′04″N 1°15′45″W

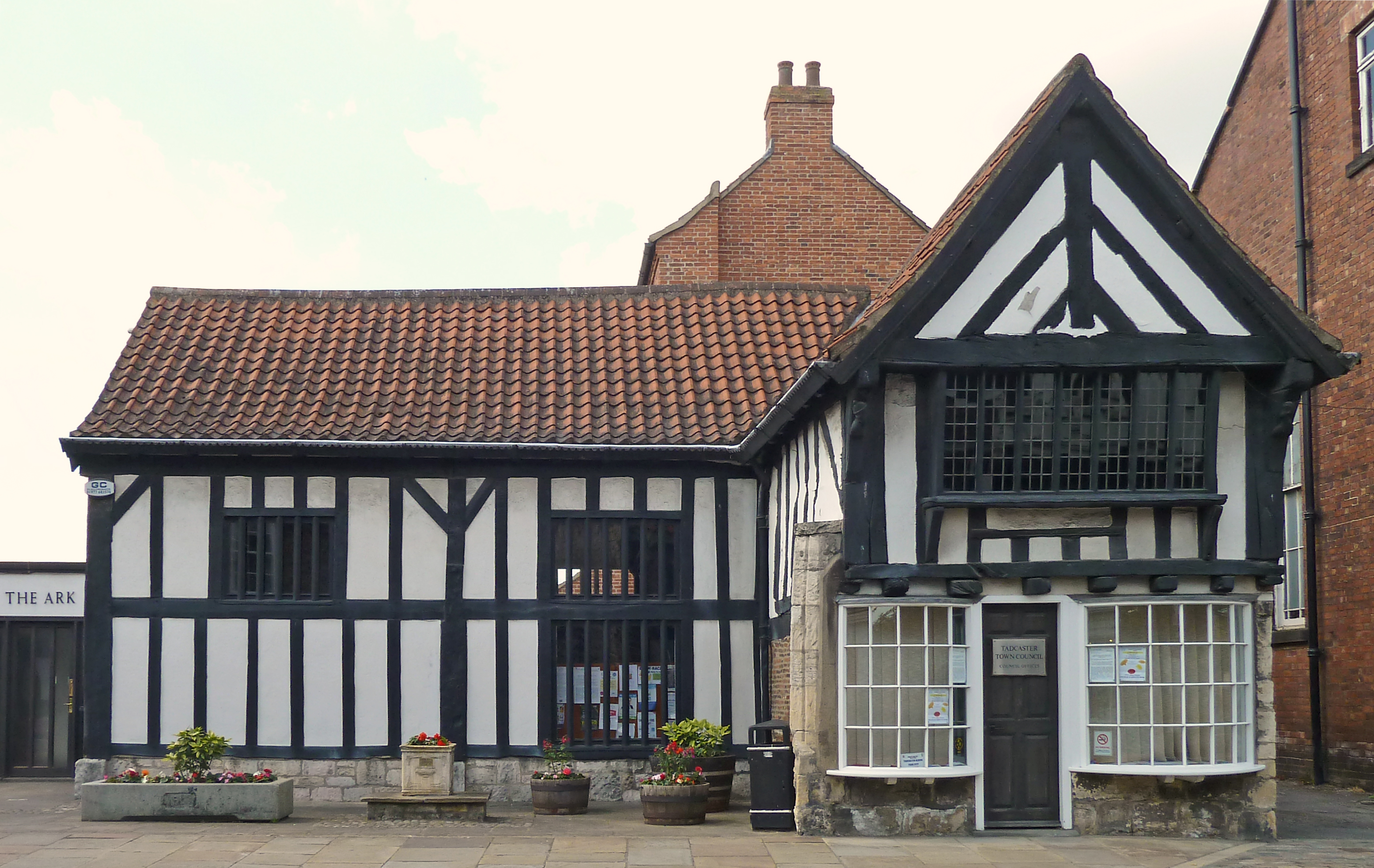
The building, in 2011

The Ark is a historic building on Kirkgate in Tadcaster, a town in North Yorkshire, England.

The building was constructed in the late 15th century, and was altered in the 17th century. A tradition claims that the Pilgrim Fathers met at the building, to plan their voyage to the Americas. In 1672, it was known as "Morley Hall", and was owned by Robert Morley. He registered it that year as an independent meeting hall for Congregationalists, one of the first to be legally registered. The building was later converted into a pub, the Old Falcon Inn.

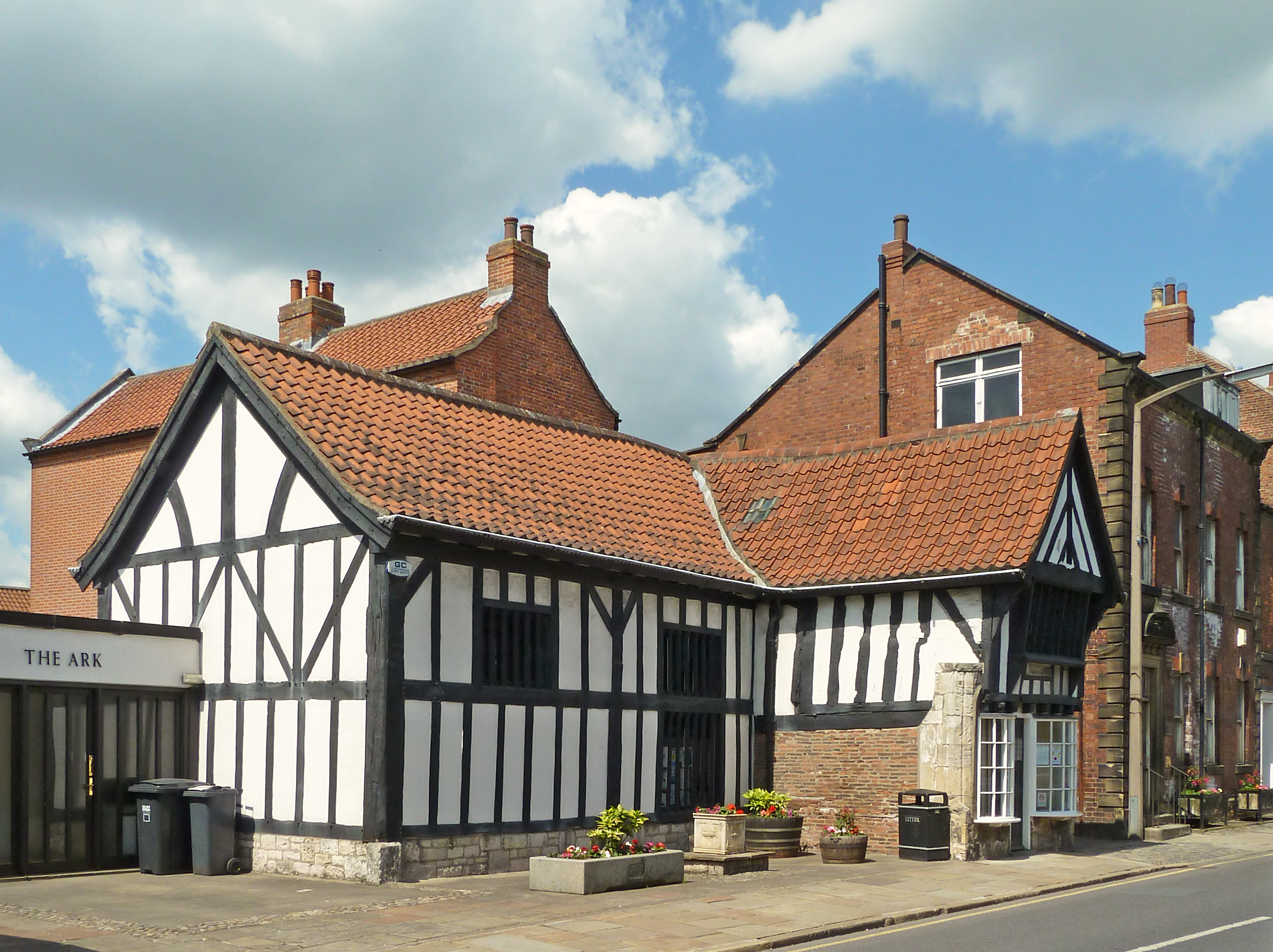
The building, in 2011

In 1959, John Smiths Brewery purchased the building, and converted it into a museum covering local history, in particular the local brewing industry. They rebuilt part of the structure, using original timbers, and added a small extension on its left-hand side. In 1985, the building was upgraded to be Grade II* listed. The museum closed in 1988, and the building became the headquarters of Tadcaster Town Council.

The building is two storeys high, and consists of a two-bay hall, and a single-bay crosswing. The building is timber-framed over a Magnesian Limestone and brick base, and the roof is covered in pantiles. The upper floor is slightly jettied, and it has an oriel window with wooden mullions. The gable is supported by two brackets, depicting the heads of a man and woman, reputed to be Noah and Noah's wife, which had led the building to be named after Noah's Ark.

There is a replica of the building in Berlin Center, Ohio, which serves as an animal sanctuary.

== See also ==
- Grade II* listed buildings in North Yorkshire (district)
- Listed buildings in Tadcaster
