= Londesborough Arms =

Londesborough Arms is the name of:

- Londesborough Arms, Market Weighton, pub in the East Riding of Yorkshire, England
- Londesborough Arms, Seamer, pub in North Yorkshire, England
- Londesborough Arms, Tadcaster, pub in North Yorkshire, England
