= Tadcaster Bridge =

Bridge in North Yorkshire, England

- The bridge in June 2018
- Coordinates: 53.885007°N 1.259851°W
- Carries: A659
- Crosses: River Wharfe
- Locale: Tadcaster, North Yorkshire, England
- Official name: Wharfe Bridge

Characteristics
- Design: Bridge
- Material: Magnesian Limestone
- No. of spans: 5
- Piers in water: 3

History
- Opened: c. 1700
- Closed: 2015 Re-opened 3 February 2017

Location
- Interactive map of Tadcaster Bridge

Tadcaster Bridge or Wharfe Bridge spans the River Wharfe in Tadcaster, North Yorkshire, England. The road bridge is believed to date from around 1700. It is the main route connecting the two sides of the town and one of two road crossings in the town, the other being the bridge for the A64 bypass. Tadcaster Bridge partially collapsed on 29 December 2015 after flooding that followed Storm Eva, and reopened on 3 February 2017.

== History ==
The first bridge is believed to have been constructed around 1200, using stone from Tadcaster Castle, and the current bridge was built around 1700. Each of its seven bays has a cutwater and arch supporting the roadway and parapet. Built of Magnesian Limestone, the bridge was widened in the 19th century on the upstream side. It was listed at Grade II on 12 July 1985.

The bridge was temporarily closed after flooding in 2012.

=== Partial collapse and repair ===
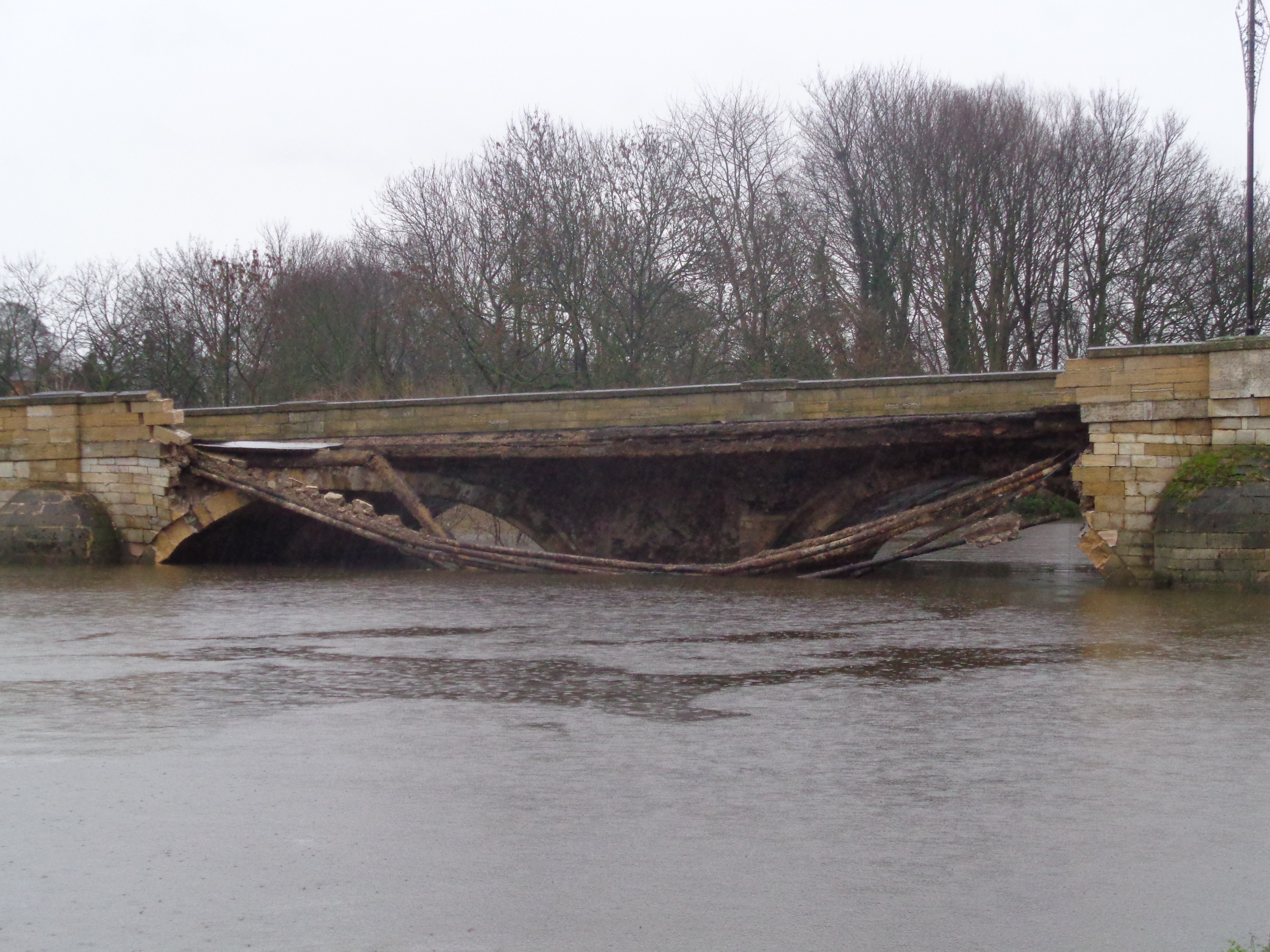
Tadcaster Bridge on the day after the collapse

Concerns for public safety led to the bridge closing to pedestrians and traffic on 26 December 2015. The town started to flood the same day as a result of heavy rainfall following Storm Eva, and on the evening of 29 December the bridge partially collapsed. It caused the gas main to fracture and prompted the evacuation of hundreds of residents. Without use of the bridge, traffic could cross the river only via the A64, which required a long detour. Pedestrians could cross the river using the Tadcaster Viaduct.

In early 2016, Historic England carried out an assessment of the significance of the Grade-II listed bridge to inform its restoration, revealing that the bridge had been widened in 1791, expanding a structure built in 1698 that had replaced an earlier one.

The bridge repair took thirteen months at a cost of £4.4 million. The provision of an adjacent temporary pedestrian footbridge was deemed essential. Following a refusal by Samuel Smith's Brewery to allow a temporary footbridge to be built on its land, an alternative site was found using land owned by Selby District Council and Tadcaster Town Council. Tadcaster Albion Football Club allowed access across its car park for people to reach the footbridge.

The bridge reopened on 3 February 2017. The reconstruction work was funded jointly by the UK government, which contributed £3 million, and a Local Enterprise Partnership which contributed £1.4 million.

== See also ==
- List of crossings of the River Wharfe
- Listed buildings in Tadcaster
