= Londesborough Arms, Tadcaster =

Historic brewery in North Yorkshire, England

Coordinates: 53°53′02″N 1°15′41″W

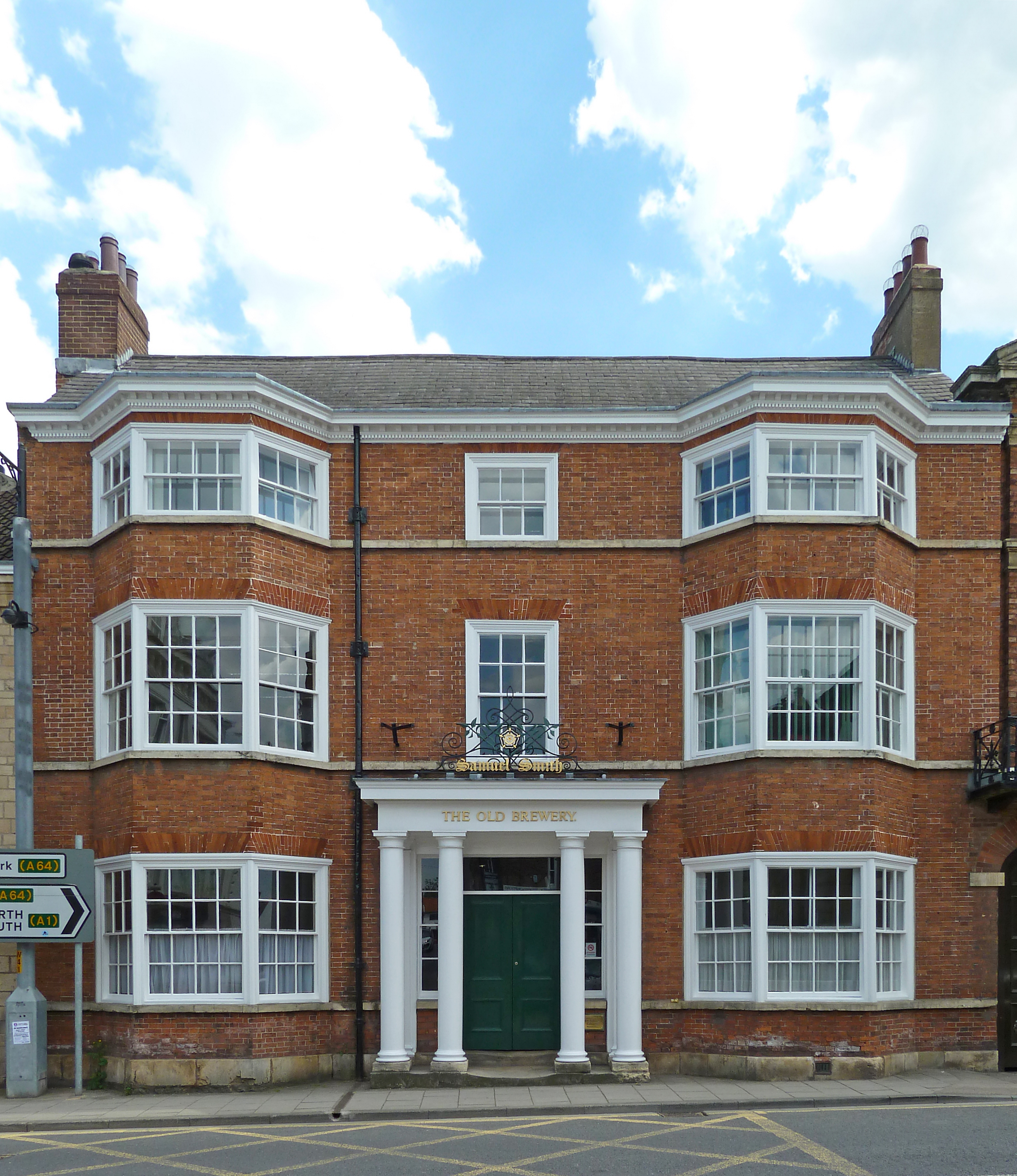
The building, in 2011

The Londesborough Arms is a historic building in the town centre of Tadcaster, in North Yorkshire, in England.

By the Georgian period, The White Horse on Bridge Street was Tadcaster's most important coaching inn. With the construction of the railways, the trade of the inns fell, and in 1841 the inn closed, and was converted into three houses. In 1855, Albert Denison, 1st Baron Londesborough, wished to establish a hotel in the town, to put up his guests. He purchased the property, recombining the houses to create the Londesborough Arms hotel.

From 1875 to 1877, the town's Anglican services were held in the hotel, while St Mary's Church was being rebuilt. The hotel remained open until 1976, when it was purchased by Samuel Smith Old Brewery. The building was combined with the neighbouring Old Town Hall, and converted into offices for the brewery. In 1985, it was Grade II listed.

The building is late 18th century, with 19th-century alterations. It is built of brick, with stone dressings and a slate roof. It has three storeys and is three bays wide, with a central entrance. It has double doors, below a fanlight, with a frieze and cornice, and the brewery logo in wrought iron above. The outer bays are canted, and there are chimney stacks at each end of the building. Inside, there is a central hallway with an 18th-century staircase, and two ground floor rooms have elaborate 19th-century mouldings.

== See also ==
- Listed buildings in Tadcaster
