= St Mary's Church, Tadcaster =

Church in Tadcaster, North Yorkshire, England

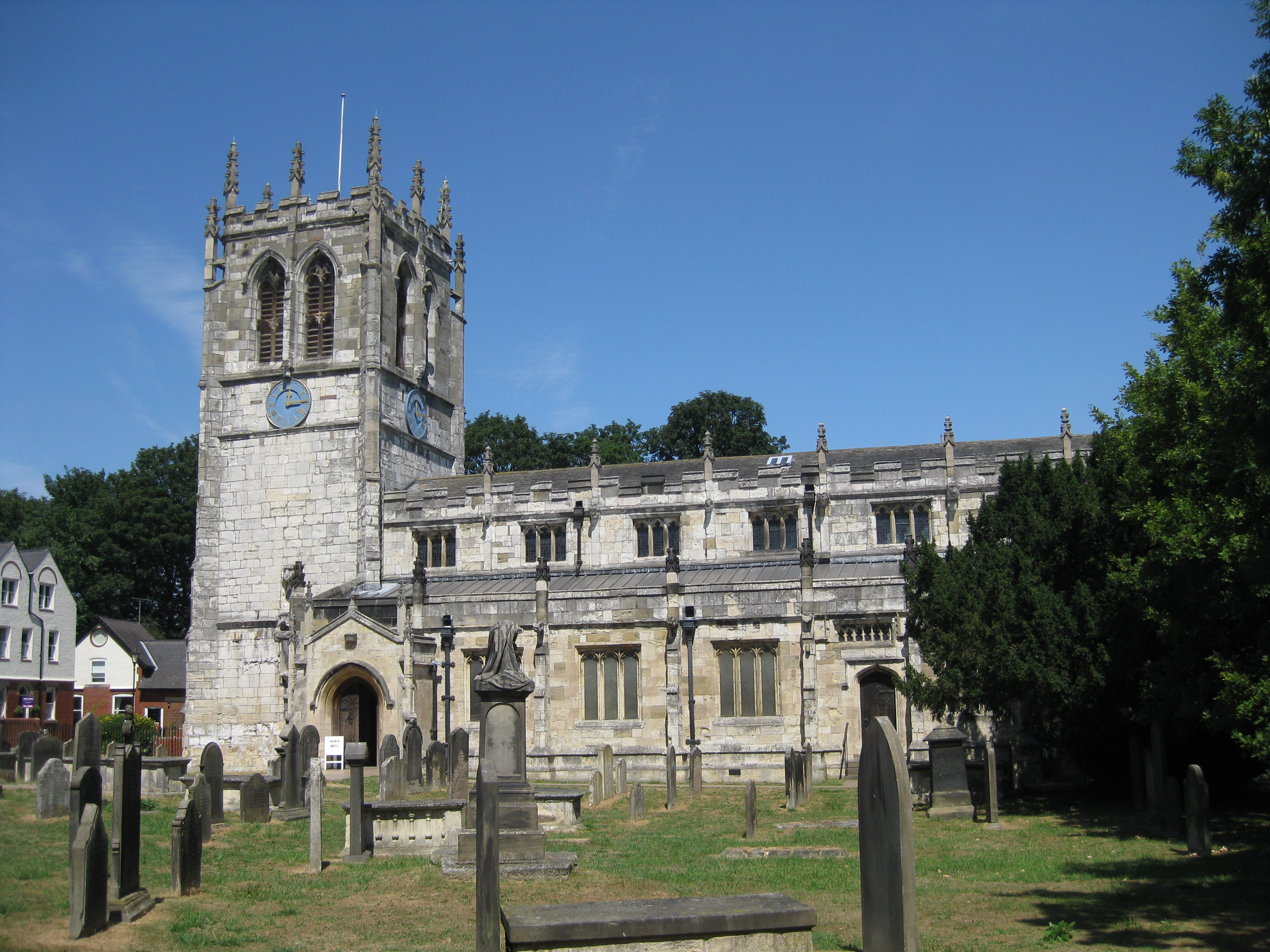
- St Mary's Church, Tadcaster
- St Mary's Church, Tadcaster
- 53.8855°N 1.2623°W
- Denomination: Church of England
- Churchmanship: Broad Church
- Website: St Mary, Tadcaster

History
- Dedication: St Mary

Administration
- Province: York
- Diocese: Leeds
- Parish: Tadcaster

St Mary's Church is an Anglican parish church in Tadcaster, North Yorkshire, England. It was built in the 15th century and is an active place of worship.

== Location ==
The church is located off Kirkgate, next to what was formerly the town's market square. As it is on the banks of the River Wharfe, it has been prone to flooding.

== History ==
Though there is no record of a church in the Domesday Book for "Tatecastre", the Ecclesiastical History of the English People (AD 731) records that Hieu, founder and Abbess of Hartlepool Abbey came to live in Tadcaster, so there may have been a wooden church before the Norman conquest.

The first stone church was erected in about 1150 AD, with further additions till 1318, when it was burnt and sacked by the Scots. It was rebuilt on a larger scale in about 1380. Further additions were made during 1420 to 1480, bringing it to its present shape.

Unfortunately the building was subject to flooding, which was inconvenient for the worshippers and caused structural damage, as noted in a petition of 1758 and an architect's report of 1859 which noted amongst other things that the top of the tower overhung the base by 17 inches (430 mm). To safeguard it from further floods, the church was taken down in 1875–77, re-erected and raised 4 feet (1.2 m). This was largely successful until 2015, when it was flooded to a depth of about 3 feet 3 inches (1 m).

The rebuilding was supervised by architect Edward Birchall of Leeds, who used much of the old material and carefully reproduced the features and style, at a cost (raised by public subscription) of £8,000. This included the incorporation of a 12th-century arch and a fragment of a Saxon cross. However, the old pews were replaced with ones of a modern and lighter style. In 1897 the north wall was rebuilt 8 feet (2.4 m) further out, widening the north aisle.

The church was Grade II* listed on 12 July 1985.

== Building ==
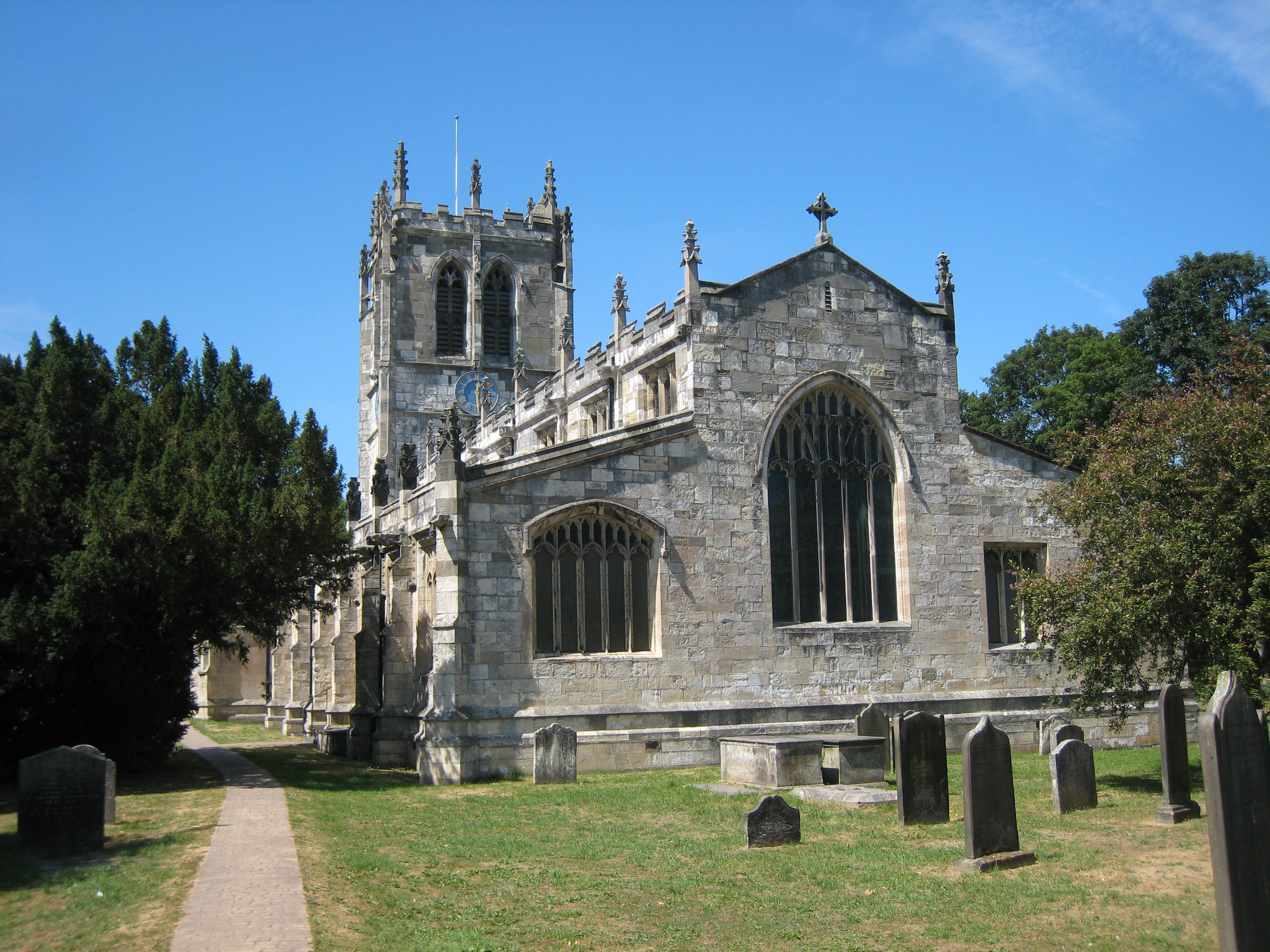
East face

The church is of a perpendicular style and built out of local magnesian limestone with Welsh slate roof. The church has a three-stage west tower, a three-stage bay aisled nave, south porch and a two-bay aisled chancel. It has been described as possessing "a fine show of buttresses, pinnacles and gargoyles." As mentioned in the section above, it contains fragments of a Norman church incorporated at various points.

The tower is square with battlements, and was originally a bell tower, with a clock being added some time before 1764. A three-faced clock was installed in 1858 and the present one dates from 1887. The current 8 bells were re-cast in 1935 from an earlier set of 6 bells, dating back to 1760. It has niches which would formerly have held statues of saints.

== Interior ==
The interior features pointed arches on columns and extensive carved woodwork, including the 1877 pews, a 1912 pulpit and a 1915 screen in the St Nicholas chapel. The black and white flooring is marble, from 1903. The East Window above the altar is stained glass by Morris & Co. Most of the design is by Edward Burne-Jones, but some panels are by William Morris himself. The organ dates from 1833 by Elliot and Hill, but having been rebuilt three times.

== Parish ==
The parish has four churches; in Tadcaster, Newton Kyme, Kirk Fenton, Kirkby Wharfe.

== See also ==
- Grade II* listed buildings in North Yorkshire (district)
- Listed buildings in Tadcaster
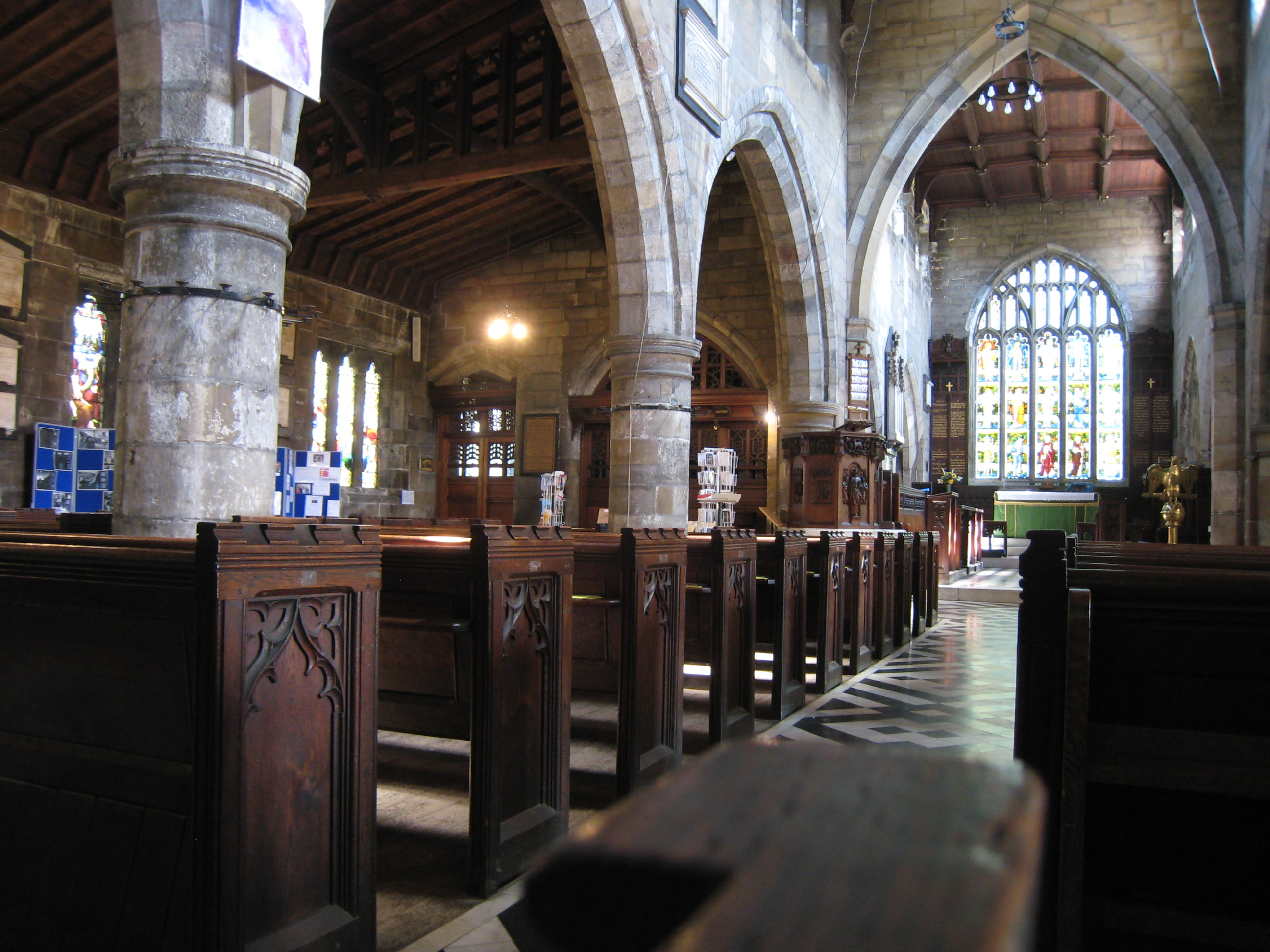
Interior

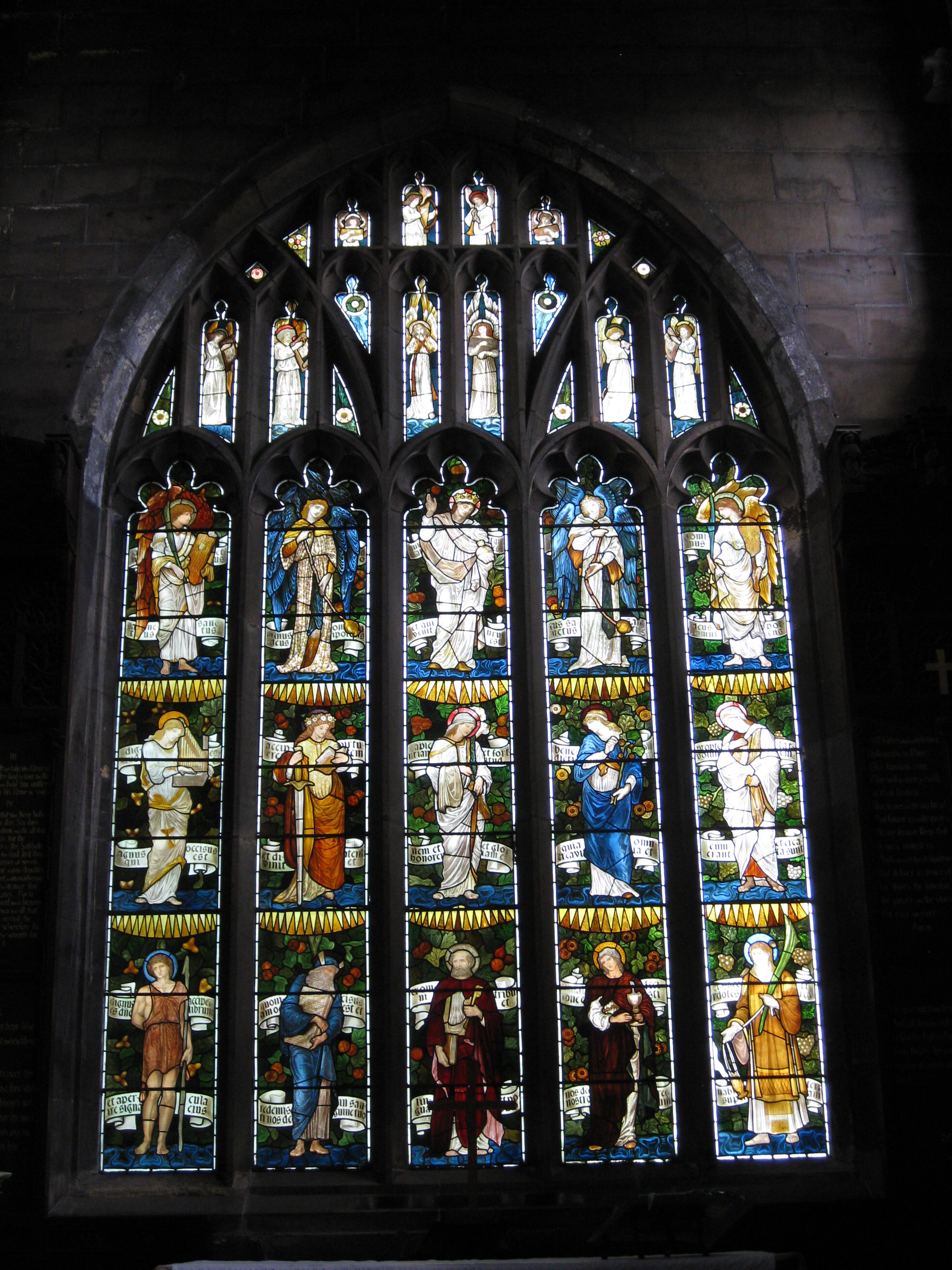
East window

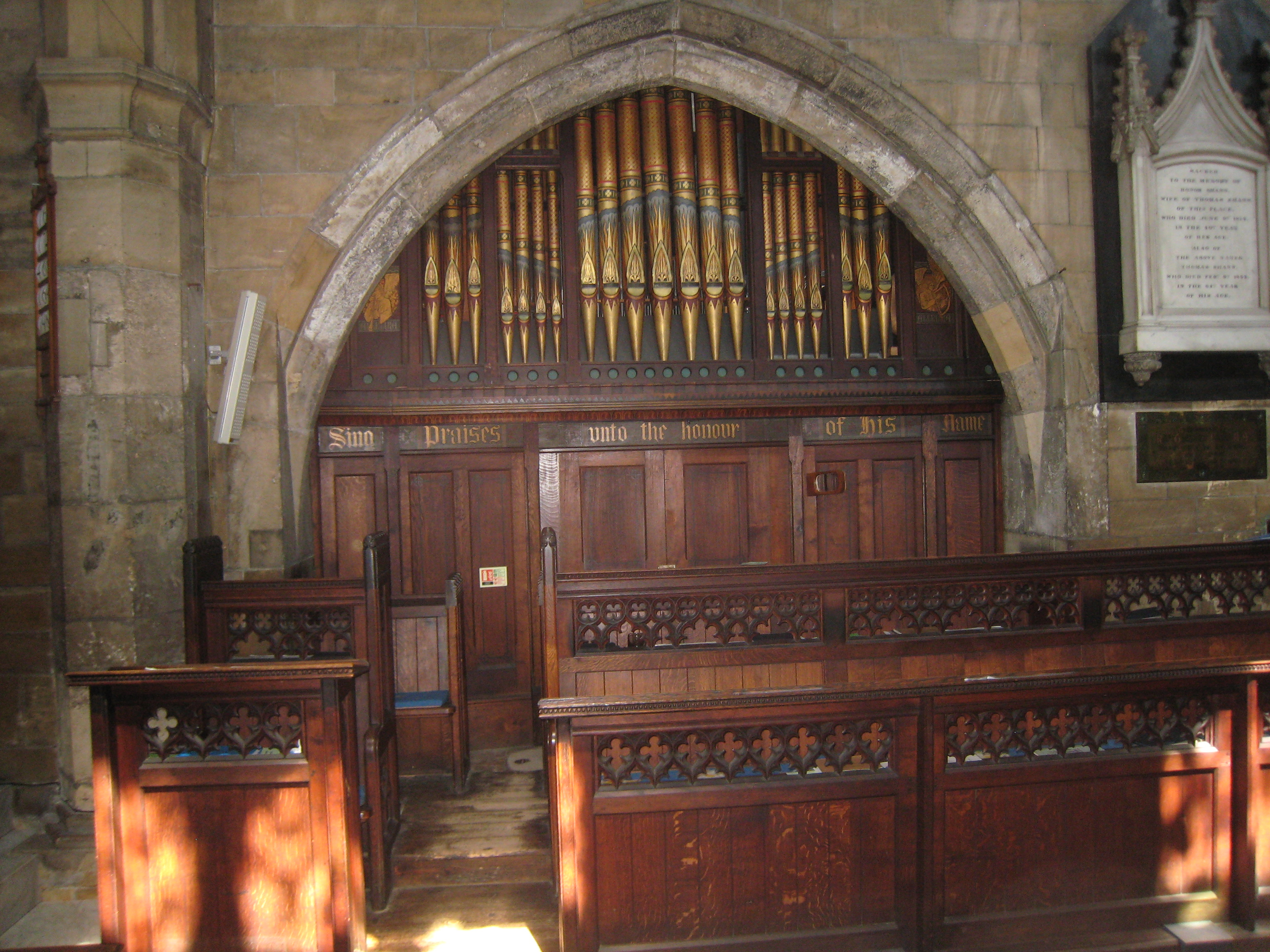
Organ and choir stalls

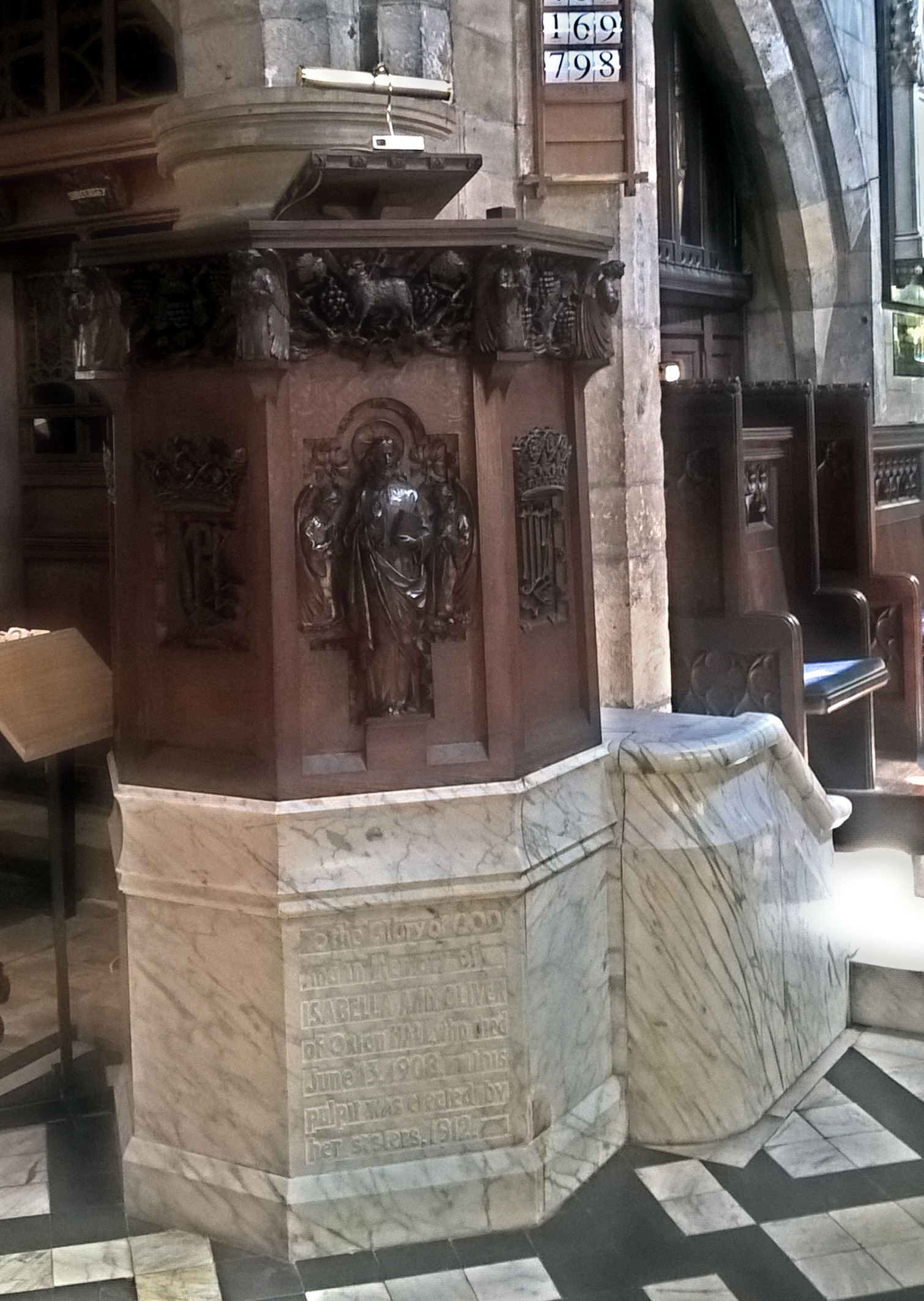
Pulpit
