= Grape (disambiguation) =

A grape is a fruit that grows on the vines of plants in the genus Vitis.

Grape or Grapes may also refer to:

- Grapes (surname)
- Don Cherry (born 1934), Canadian retired hockey player and head coach and commentator, nicknamed "Grapes"
- GRAPE, a computer programming environment
- Gravity Pipe, a Tokyo University supercomputer (abbreviated GRAPE)
- Grapes (film), a 2008 Czech film
- Grape-kun, a Humboldt penguin who lived in a Japanese zoo
- Grapeshot, a kind of ballistic projectile
- Gray rape, sometimes shortened to "grape"
- Grape, the main antagonist of Princess Peach: Showtime!

== See also ==
- The Grapes (disambiguation)
- Grape Island (disambiguation)
