= Grapple =

Grapple may refer to:

== Actions ==
- Grappling, techniques, maneuvers, and counters applied to an opponent in order to gain a physical advantage
- Grapple tackle, a controversial tackling technique used in rugby league
- Submission wrestling (also submission grappling), a formula of competition

== Technology and vehicles ==
- Grapple (tool), a hook or claw used to catch or hold something
- Grapple skidder, type of heavy vehicle used in a logging operation for pulling cut trees out of a forest
- Grapple truck, a truck that has a grapple loader mounted to its frame
- Grapple (network layer), a free software package for adding multiplayer support to computer games and applications
- Grapple fixture, on spacecraft or other objects to provide a secure connection for a robotic arm

== Military ==
- Operation Grapple, a series of United Kingdom nuclear weapon tests
- Operation Grapple (Yugoslavia), codename given to the deployment of British forces in Bosnia from 1992
- USNS Grapple (T-ARS-53), a Safeguard-class salvage ship in the United States Navy
- USS Grapple (ARS-7), a Diver-class rescue and salvage ship commissioned by the U.S. Navy

== Plants and food ==
- Grāpple, the brand name of a commercially marketed grape-flavored apple
- A combination of grape and apple flavors
- Harpagophytum procumbens (also grapple plant), a plant of the sesame family

== In fiction ==
- Grapple (Transformers), an Autobot from the second season of The Transformers TV series
- Grappler (comics), a fictional character in the Marvel Universe
- Settling Accounts: The Grapple, the third book in the Settling Accounts series by Harry Turtledove

== See also ==
- Grape (disambiguation)
- Grasp (disambiguation)
- Graupel
