= York Community Woodland =

Woodland in Yorkshire, England

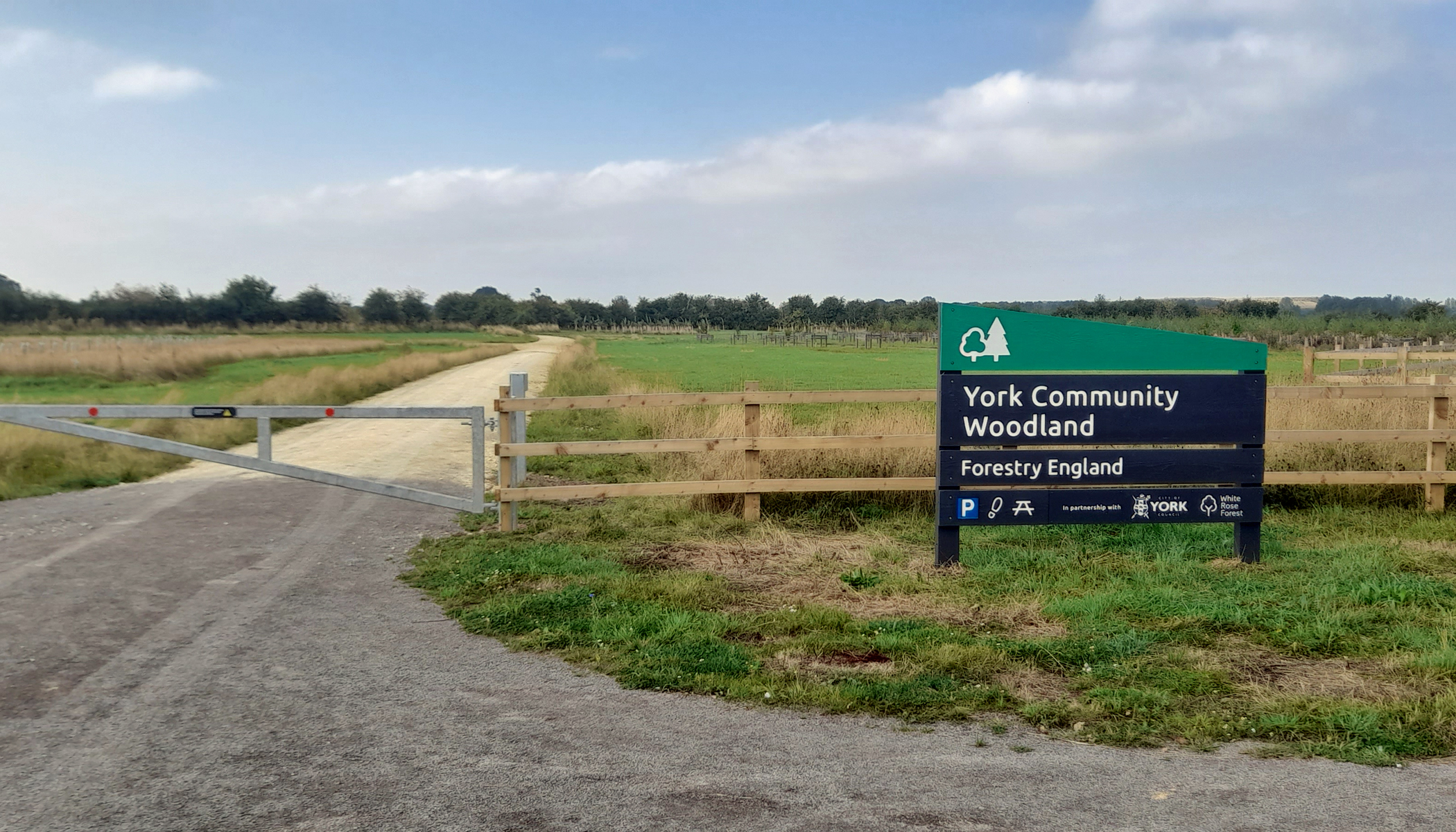
- York Community Woodland sign
- Interactive map of York Community Woodland

Geography
- Location: Yorkshire and the Humber, England
- Coordinates: 53.96°N 1.16°W
- Elevation: 20 m (66 ft)
- Area: 78 ha (193 acres)

Administration
- Status: Open
- Established: 2019
- Authority: Forestry England (leaseholder); York City Council (owner)
- Website: www.forestryengland.uk/york-community-woodland

Ecology
- Forest cover: 65% (projected)

York Community Woodland is a site managed by Forestry England near Knapton in York, England. The site covers 78 hectares (193 acres), and by its opening in 2024, 210,000 trees had been planted. The site is owned by the City of York Council, and offers an open space on the western side of the City of York. Spare land has been allocated on the eastern side for a possible ring road expansion, and when the landfill site to the west is remediated, provision has been made for the woodland to expand over that area.

== History ==
The site, which is close to Knapton on the A1237 northern York ring road, started out with a plan by York Council in 2019 to plant 50,000 trees to offset carbon emissions in a net-zero programme. The City of York Council set aside £1.61 million of funding in August 2020 to purchase the land needed for the woodland. Previously, the site was used for agricultural purposes, with Foss Dike and Moor Lane Drain watercourses (to the west and north of the site respectively), and several mature trees already in place as part of the hedgerows and borders of the fields. Upon opening, the councillor from the City of York Council who oversees environmental projects, noted that the western side of York has less green and open space, and encouraged those on the western side of York (such as Acomb), to visit the woodland. The project is a joint venture between the White Rose Forest and York City Council, and is part of Forestry England's ambition to plant over 2,000 hectares (4,900 acres) of woodland across England by 2026.

The site, which covers 78 hectares (193 acres) at a height of 20 metres (66 ft) aod, officially opened to the public in August 2024, by which time, 210,000 trees had been planted. The tree planting programme is part of York City Council's effort to increase the city's tree canopy cover from 10.8%, to 13% by 2050; the equivalent of 20 hectares (50 acres) of new canopy cover each year. Before mass planting took place, an archaeological investigation was carried out which determined that the site had limited noteworthy history despite being only 380 metres (1,250 ft) south of the theorised road between Eboracum (York) and Isurium (Aldborough). The site is designated to be mainly "native mixed broadleaf woodland", with a tree canopy cover of 65%, and open space areas making up the remaining 35%. Part of the site (Whinny Wood), is located across the B1224, which largely forms the southern boundary of the woodland.

Whilst the site has a car park, the woodland is also accessible from the nearby Poppleton Bar Park and Ride facility, and is also on a cycle route that connects to Knapton. The site was announced as the silver award in the Community Woodland of the Year 2023 competition.

Provision has been made for the woodland to extend westwards over the Harewood Whin landfill site (when areas there are no longer required for waste deposition), and also for the A1237 ring road to be widened if necessary in the future.

== Wildlife ==
Although by the time of opening, most of the trees were saplings, the site was host to two barn owls, and sparrowhawks, buzzards, kestrels and red kites have been spotted on the site. Water voles are also present on Foss Dike, which is just to the west of the site, and part of the landfill area. This may be converted into woodland when the landfill ceases operations and the area is remediated.
