= The Grapes =

The Grapes may refer to:

== Pubs in England ==
- The Grapes, Beverley, East Riding of Yorkshire
- Grapes Inn, Ebberston, North Yorkshire
- The Grapes, Eccles, Greater Manchester
- Grapes Inn, Heywood, Greater Manchester
- Grapes Inn, Lees, Greater Manchester
- The Grapes, Limehouse, London
- The Grapes, Slingsby, North Yorkshire
- The Grapes, Wandsworth, London
- The Grapes, York, North Yorkshire

== Other uses ==
- The Grapes (band), an American jam and southern rock band
- The Grapes, an Australian band featuring Ashley Naylor and Sherry Rich

== See also ==
- Grape
- Grapes of Wrath (disambiguation)
