= RAF Rufforth =

Former Royal Air Force base in Yorkshire, England

RAF Rufforth
- Rufforth, North Yorkshire in England

Site information
- Type: Royal Air Force station
- Owner: Ministry of Defence
- Operator: Royal Air Force
- Controlled by: RAF Bomber Command

Location
- Shown within North Yorkshire RAF Rufforth (the United Kingdom)
- Coordinates: 53°56′54″N 001°11′04″W

Site history
- Built: 1941
- In use: 1942 - 1974
- Battles/wars: European theatre of World War II

Airfield information
- Elevation: 16 metres (52 ft) AMSL
Runways
Direction	Length and surface
06/24	1,812 metres (5,945 ft) Concrete
11/29	1,234 metres (4,049 ft) Concrete
18/36	1,280 metres (4,199 ft) Concrete

Royal Air Force Rufforth or RAF Rufforth is a former Royal Air Force station located near Rufforth in North Yorkshire, England. It was used by only one operational squadron on long-range bombing missions during the Second World War, with most flying dedicated to conversion units under the auspices of nearby RAF Marston Moor. Post-war, the RAF used the site to house maintenance units, gliding schools and observation flights. It was completely disposed of by the MoD in 1981, and now is used for civilian light aircraft and glider flying.

== History ==
The site at RAF Rufforth was surveyed by the Air Ministry in 1940, and built by John Laing & Son Ltd for the Royal Air Force in 1941 (completed 1942), it is located on the south side of the village. The airfield had one B1 and two T2 hangars and 36 aircraft hard standings and there was accommodation for 1,531 males and 251 females of all ranks. During construction, the base was used several times by aircraft form the Conversion units based at nearby airfields. For most of its wartime life, the base operated as a sub-station of nearby RAF Marston Moor.

The airfield was officially opened at the start of November 1942, with No. 158 Squadron becoming the first squadron to arrive from RAF East Moor with Halifax bombers. The squadron was initially used on long-range bombing missions to Italy (Genoa being a frequent target), which led to a high attrition rate due to aircraft often running out of fuel and having to land elsewhere or crashing. By the time No. 158 Squadron were moved to RAF Lissett in February 1943, they had lost numerous aircraft and nine crews, 61 one of whom had been killed over enemy territory.

No. 1663 Heavy Conversion Unit was stood up at Rufforth in early March 1943 operating ex-operational Halifaxes, which required considerable maintenance from the ground crews. Later variants of Halifaxes were added to the unit's complement, and by 1944, it was operating 16 Lancaster aircraft too. Later, in the same year, with other aircraft swelling the inventory (including some fighter aircraft), the base was transferred from No. 4 Group to No. 7 Group, which was part of training command. With the disbandment of No. 1663 HCU following the end of the war in Europe, lighter training aircraft moved to Rufforth in the form of No. 23 Gliding School and No. 64 Group Communications Flight.

For the summer of 1945, RAF Rufforth was home to No. 8 ACHU (Air Crew Holding Unit). Other non-flying units based at RAF Rufforth in the 1940s and 1950s included No. 5131 Bomb Disposal Squadron, No.54 and No. 60 Maintenance Units.

== Units based at RAF Rufforth ==
Royal Air Force units based at RAF Rufforth
Unit	Dates	Notes	Ref
No. 35 Conversion Flight	September 1942 – 7 October 1942	Posted to RAF Marston Moor with No. 158 Conversion Flight as 1652 Heavy Conversion Unit	
No. 158 Squadron	November 1942 – February 1943	Formed at Driffield in 1942, the squadron was to use RAF Lissett, but came to Rufforth just before Lissett was operational	
No. 1663 Heavy Conversion Unit	2 March 1943 – 28 May 1945		
No. 23 Gliding School	1948 – 1955	Formed at RAF Yeadon, the unit was reformed in 1955 as No. 642 Gliding School	

=== Aircraft losses ===
A total of 18 aircraft flying from RAF Rufforth were lost in accidents including one at Bishop Wilton Wold.

== Post war ==
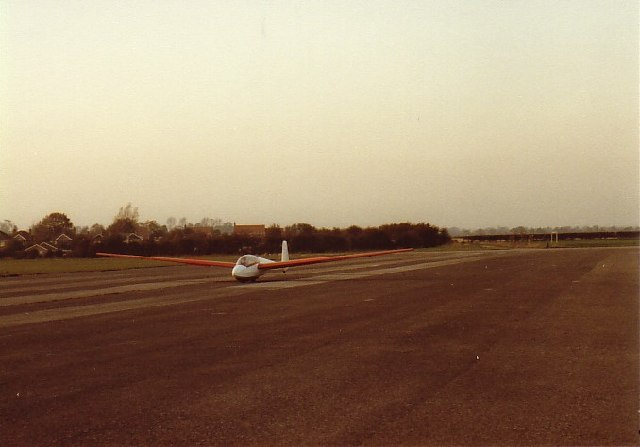
A glider on the north end of the runway at Rufforth in 1982

RAF Rufforth was home to 642 Gliding School for several years whilst being part of No. 60 Maintenance Unit RAF, the RAF left in 1974 and the Ministry of Defence (MOD) sold the site in 1981.

The historic airfield site is split into two parts. Rufforth East based on the eastern part of the site is surrounded by an arable farm owned by the Becketts, a local farming family who own the airfield. A number of hangars house resident aircraft including Microlights, Autogyros and Fixed Wing aircraft. Aircraft operate off the 05/23 runway which is ~500 metres long using a north–south link taxiway to get from the apron to the runway. Occasionally the taxiway is utilised by Autogyros when the wind is from the North or South due to their ability to land short, typically requiring only 0–20 metres of runway length to stop.

Flight training is provided by resident instructors and LAA Coaches for Microlight, Fixed Wing aircraft and Autogyros. The airfield has an onsite café with an outdoor terrace.

The other hard runway 10/28 at Rufforth East is used to offer courses in stunt riding and also used by the Police for advanced driving including tactical pursuit training. The perimeter track of Rufforth East is used by a motorcycle training academy offering courses to motorcyclists to enhance safety.

Rufforth West is owned by The York Gliding Centre, a Community Amateur Sports Club (CASC), which operates a small fleet of single and two seat gliders off runway 17/35 and the west end of runway 05/23. Pilots visiting Rufforth West, must ring the club for prior permission to land and must not overfly Rufforth East or Rufforth village to the north of the airfield. The centre section of runway 05/23 was dug up, and the land returned to agricultural use. Runway 11/29 is disused and is occasionally used by a local motorcycle safety training company for safety courses.

== Airline TV series ==
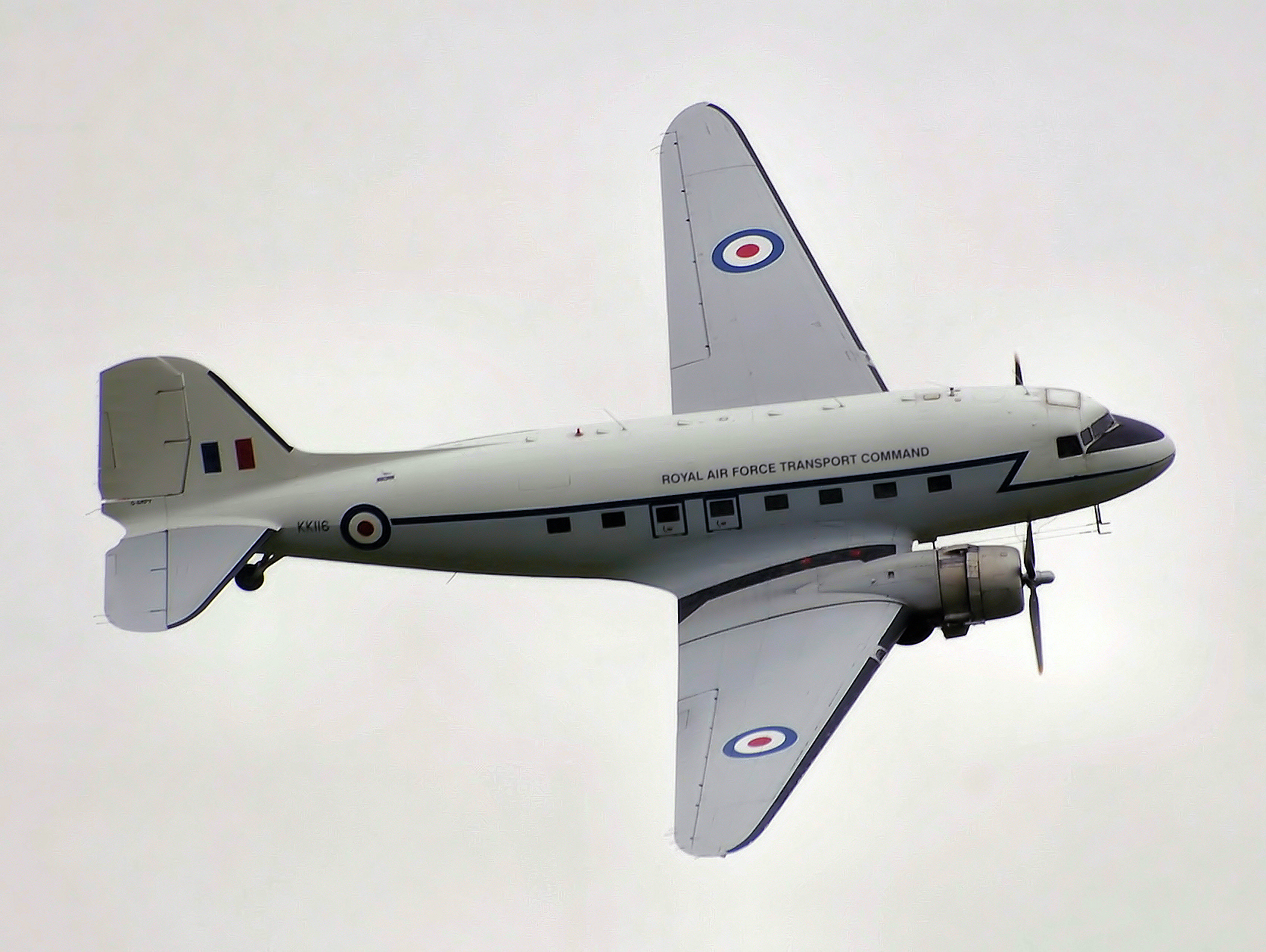
A DC3 (C47) used in filming during 1982

The ITV fictional drama series "Airline" was partially filmed at the airfield in 1982.

Airline was a period drama series set at the end of the Second World War. Its main character is Jack Ruskin (played by Roy Marsden) who as a demobbed RAF transport pilot tries to set up his own airline using a Douglas DC-3/Douglas C-47 Skytrain.

The series also starred Polly Hemingway as Jennie, Richard Heffer as Peter Witney, Sean Scanlan as Mc Evoy and Terence Rigby as Ernie Cade.

The series ran for 9 Episodes.

== Notable personnel ==
- Cyril Joe Barton, was posted to RAF Rufforth in 1943, converting to a Halifax aircraft on No. 1663 HCU
- John Pohe, was posted to RAF Rufforth in 1943, converting to a Halifax aircraft on No. 1663 HCU

== See also ==
- List of former Royal Air Force stations
- Rufforth Circuit
