= The Berkeley, Scunthorpe =

Listed pub in Lincolnshire, England

The Berkeley Hotel
- The pub in 2025

- Location within Lincolnshire

General information
- Type: Public house; originally a roadhouse
- Architectural style: Neo-Georgian, Moderne, Art Deco, Oriental
- Location: Doncaster Road, Scunthorpe, North Lincolnshire, England
- Coordinates: 53.590678°N 0.68463289°W
- Year built: Late 1930s
- Opening: 26 September 1940; 86 years ago
- Owner: Samuel Smith's

Design and construction
- Architects: Scott & Clark
- Designations

Listed Building – Grade II
- Official name: The Berkeley Hotel
- Designated: 24 August 2015
- Reference no.: 1426932

Website
- Official website

The Berkeley Hotel is a Grade II listed pub with bed-and-breakfast accommodation on Doncaster Road in Scunthorpe, a town in Lincolnshire, England. Opened in 1940 as a roadhouse for Samuel Smith's, it was designed by Scott & Clark of Wednesbury. Its interior survives largely intact and has been described by the Campaign for Real Ale (CAMRA) as being of "outstanding national historic importance". It is included in CAMRA's National Inventory of Historic Pub Interiors with a three-star rating.

== History ==
Edith Kennedy acquired the site in 1937 and sold it to Samuel Smith's Old Brewery the following year. The project was initiated by Kennedy, and the plans were developed through collaboration between her, her husband, who was a local councillor, the brewery and the architects Scott & Clark of Wednesbury. Kennedy also selected the hotel's interior decorative scheme. The hotel was built beside the A18, a major road opened in 1933 as an extension of Doncaster Road, and was intended to serve both local customers and travellers. The building was constructed as a large roadhouse and opened on 26 September 1940. It takes its name from Sir Berkeley Sheffield (1876–1946), 6th Baronet of Normanby, a former Member of Parliament for Brigg and Scunthorpe's first charter mayor.

The Berkeley Hotel is regarded by the Campaign for Real Ale (CAMRA) as having an interior of "outstanding national historic importance" and is rated three stars on its National Inventory of Historic Pub Interiors.

On 24 August 2015, the Berkeley Hotel was designated a Grade II listed building. The pub reopened in November 2023 after an extended period of closure. As of February 2026 the freehold is owned by Samuel Smith's.

== Architecture ==
=== Exterior ===
The hotel is a large brick building of two storeys, with tiled roofs and several chimney stacks. It occupies a substantial site at the junction of Doncaster Road, Scotter Road and Kingsway, with parking areas at the front and side and former garden areas to the rear. The building has an irregular U-shaped plan arranged around a courtyard.

The main frontage faces the road junction and is centred on an entrance block with double doors beneath a canopy. Above the entrance is a taller section bearing the name of the hotel. The frontage includes projecting bays, leaded windows and decorative brick and faience detailing. Additional service buildings and a detached outbuilding stand at the north-east end of the site.

A large single-storey wing extends from the north-east side of the building and originally housed the ballroom. This section contains large windows and doors opening onto the grounds and includes a stage and associated rooms.

The rear elevations face onto the central courtyard. These incorporate the former dining room, ballroom extensions and accommodation wings, with a series of large windows and doorways opening towards the courtyard. Parts of the former hotel accommodation survive within the rear wings.

The south-west side includes further accommodation and public rooms together with separate entrances that historically served different parts of the hotel. Throughout the building, features associated with Neo-Georgian, Art Deco and Moderne styles are retained, including decorative brickwork, leaded glazing, geometric detailing and the use of curved forms. The tiled roofs with deep overhanging eaves also reflect Oriental-inspired design influences that were incorporated into some British buildings of the 1930s.

=== Interior ===
Much of the building's original layout survives, together with many original doors, fittings and light fixtures. The main entrance opens into a large central hall containing the former reception area, which retains its original counter and glazed screen. A display case, cloakroom and toilet facilities also survive, although some of these spaces have been altered for modern use. Behind the reception area are service rooms and the kitchen, which remains connected to the dining room and ballroom.

A broad staircase rises from the rear of the entrance hall to the upper floor. Adjacent to the staircase is a large dining room, which retains wall panelling, a bar counter and an original bar back. The room was originally served directly from the adjoining kitchen and forms part of an intergrated arrangement linking the building's principal public rooms.

Beyond the dining room is the ballroom, which retains its original maple dance floor, stage and decorative features. Large doorways connect it to both the dining room and kitchen, reflecting its original use for functions and events. Leaded windows survive throughout much of the building.

The lounge bar in 2014

On the opposite side of the entrance hall is the lounge bar, which retains most of its fitted seating and decorative ceiling treatment. Its serving area remains linked to the dining room and public bar, while an adjoining room formerly used for off-sales survives in an altered form. Some fixtures, including the fireplace and lighting, are later replacements.

The public bar occupies part of the south-west wing and is entered separately from outside through a lobby with terrazzo flooring. The bar retains its original counter, bar back and fixed seating. Associated spaces, including entrance lobbies and toilet facilities, also survive, although some have been altered over time.

The upper floor originally provided hotel accommodation, including bedrooms, shared bathrooms and a writing lounge. While some rooms have been adapted and modern bathrooms added, the original arrangement remains largely legible. Part of the first floor now forms a manager's flat, which retains its own staircase and access to service areas below.
