= Samuel Smith Old Brewery =

Brewery and pub operator in the UK

Samuel Smith Brewery

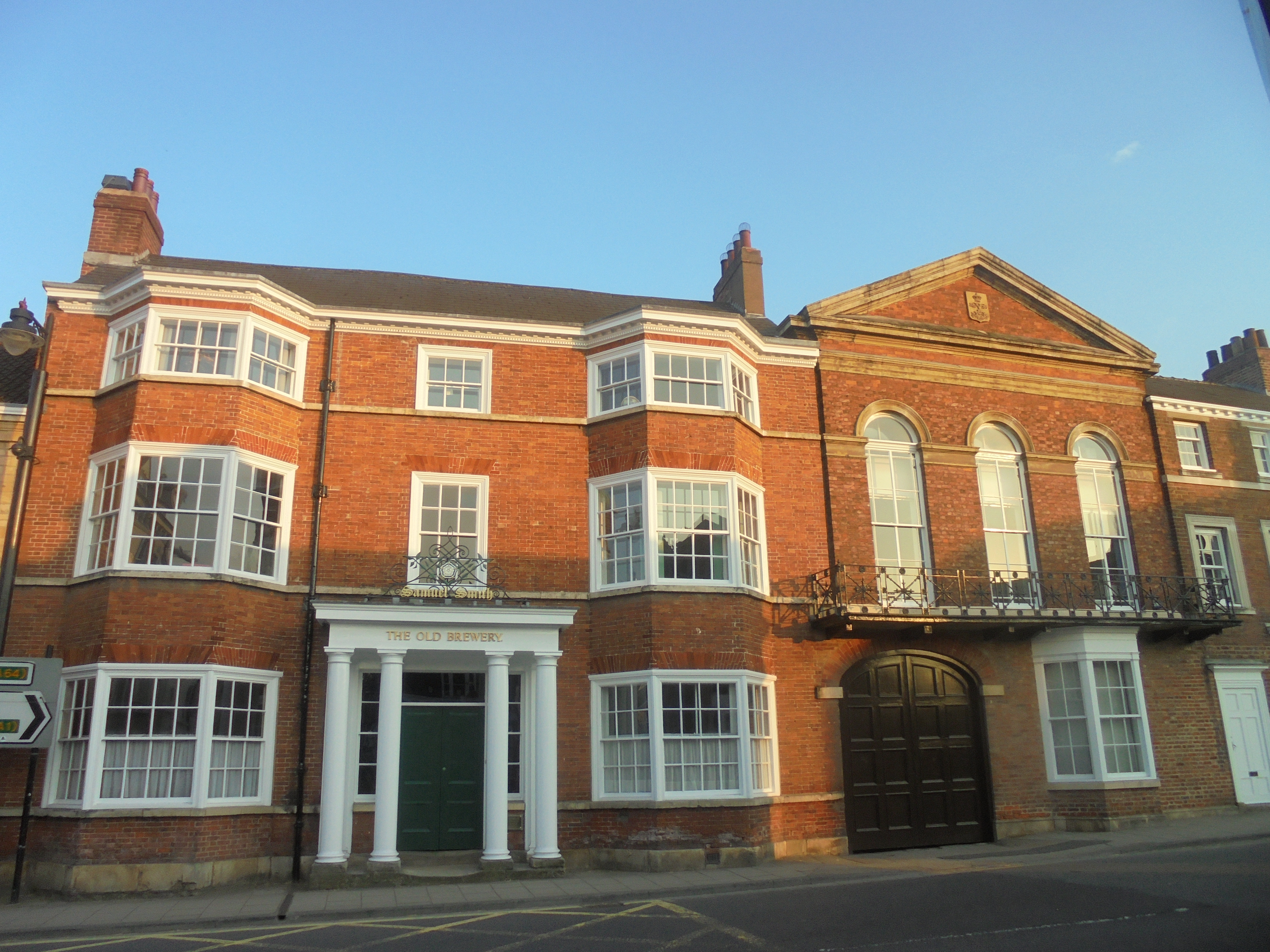
- The Old Brewery, High Street, Tadcaster
- Type: Unlimited company
- Industry: Brewing
- Founded: 1758
- Founder: Samuel Smith
- Headquarters: Tadcaster, North Yorkshire, England
- Key people: Humphrey Smith
- Products: Beer
- Owner: Family owned
- Website: samuelsmithsbrewery.co.uk

Samuel Smith Old Brewery, commonly known as Samuel Smith's or Sam Smith's, is a family owned independent brewery and pub and hotel operator based in Tadcaster, North Yorkshire, England, established in 1758. It claims to be Yorkshire's oldest brewery.

It is known for being traditionally run with conservative values, still using dray horses for some beer deliveries, and banning music, television and mobile devices in its bars.

== History ==
Tadcaster had been a centre for brewing since the 14th century because of its gypsum-rich wells. The Old Brewery was established as the Backhouse & Hartley Brewery in 1758.

In 1847, John Smith, supported by his father, a butcher and cattle dealer from Meanwood, purchased it and built his new John Smith's Brewery close by. John Smith's brother William, who ran the business after John's death in 1879, left the Old Brewery to his nephew Samuel in 1886. However, Samuel inherited an empty building and well, with all equipment having been moved next door. Nevertheless, he refitted and opened his brewery.

Samuel Smith traditional bottled beer styles influenced American craft brewers such as Goose Island and Brooklyn Brewery in the late 1970s and early 1980s.

In 1982, the company took the "extraordinary" step of changing itself from a standard limited liability company to an unlimited company, making its owners personally liable for all debts. As a result, the company is no longer required to publish its financial accounts, and has not done so since. Around this time, Humphrey Smith became the brewery's owner. Under Humphrey's leadership, the brewery instigated several unusual policies, many designed to keep the atmosphere of their pubs traditional. Humphrey's uncompromising stance on these and other decisions led to many controversies, though they have also been praised for sustaining the character of the pubs in a changing market. Humphrey Smith remained the owner and manager of the businesses until his death in 2026, when his son Samuel Smith expected to take charge of the brewery. Several pubs which he had closed down and offered for sale on condition that they were not to be used as pubs were taken off the market after his death. CAMRA had protested about this policy.

== The Old Brewery ==
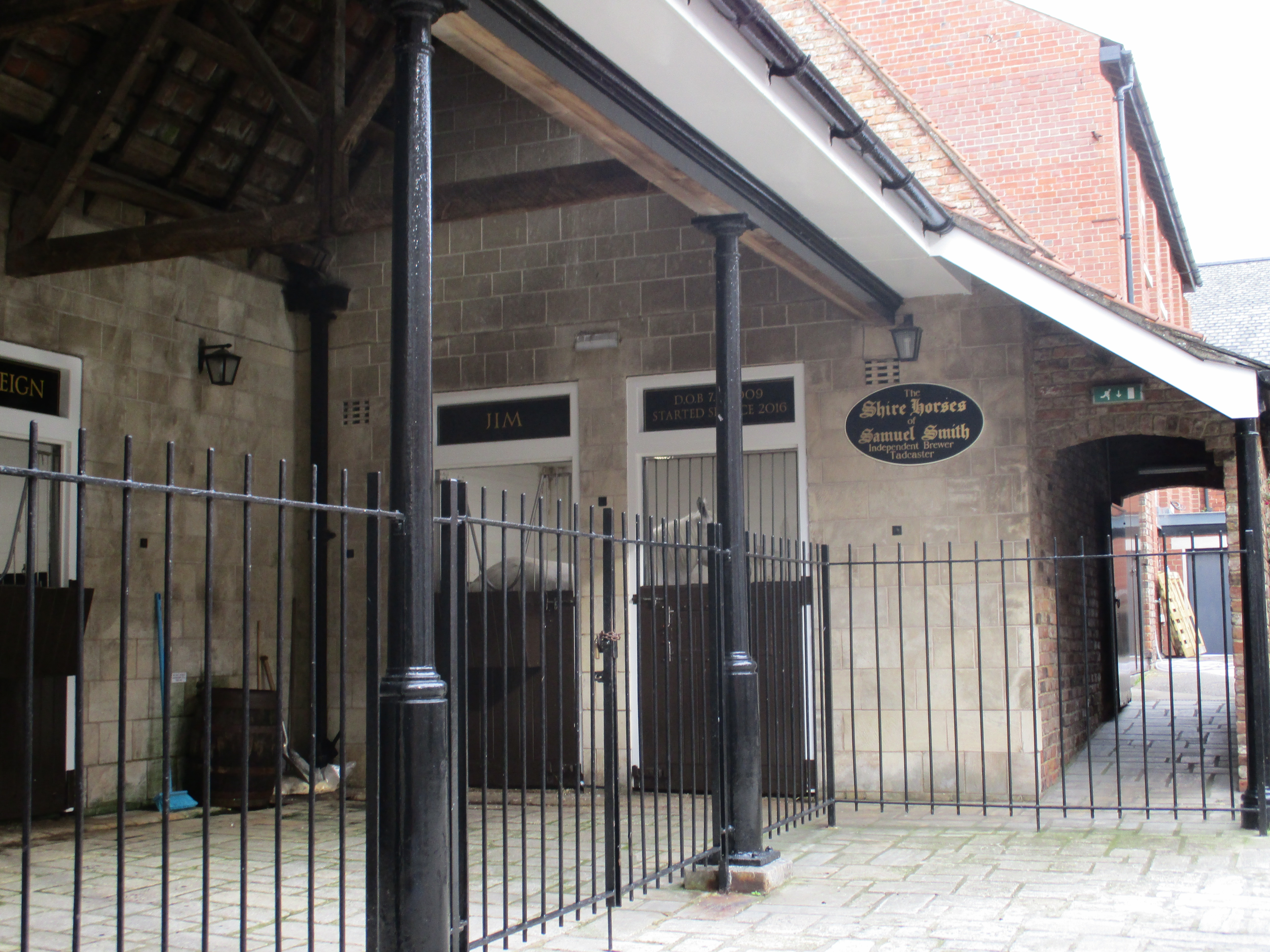
Stables for the dray horses at the Old Brewery

The Old Brewery is the smallest of three current Tadcaster breweries and one of the few remaining British breweries to employ a traditional, 19th century, Yorkshire Square fermentation system constructed of Welsh slate.

Brewing water for ales and stouts is drawn from the original 85 ft (26 m) well, sunk when the site was established in 1758, and the fermentation yeast has been used continuously since approximately 1900, making it one of the oldest unchanged strains in the country.

The brewery's team of dapple-grey shire horses are among the last working dray horses in the world and deliver beer around Tadcaster.

== Beers ==
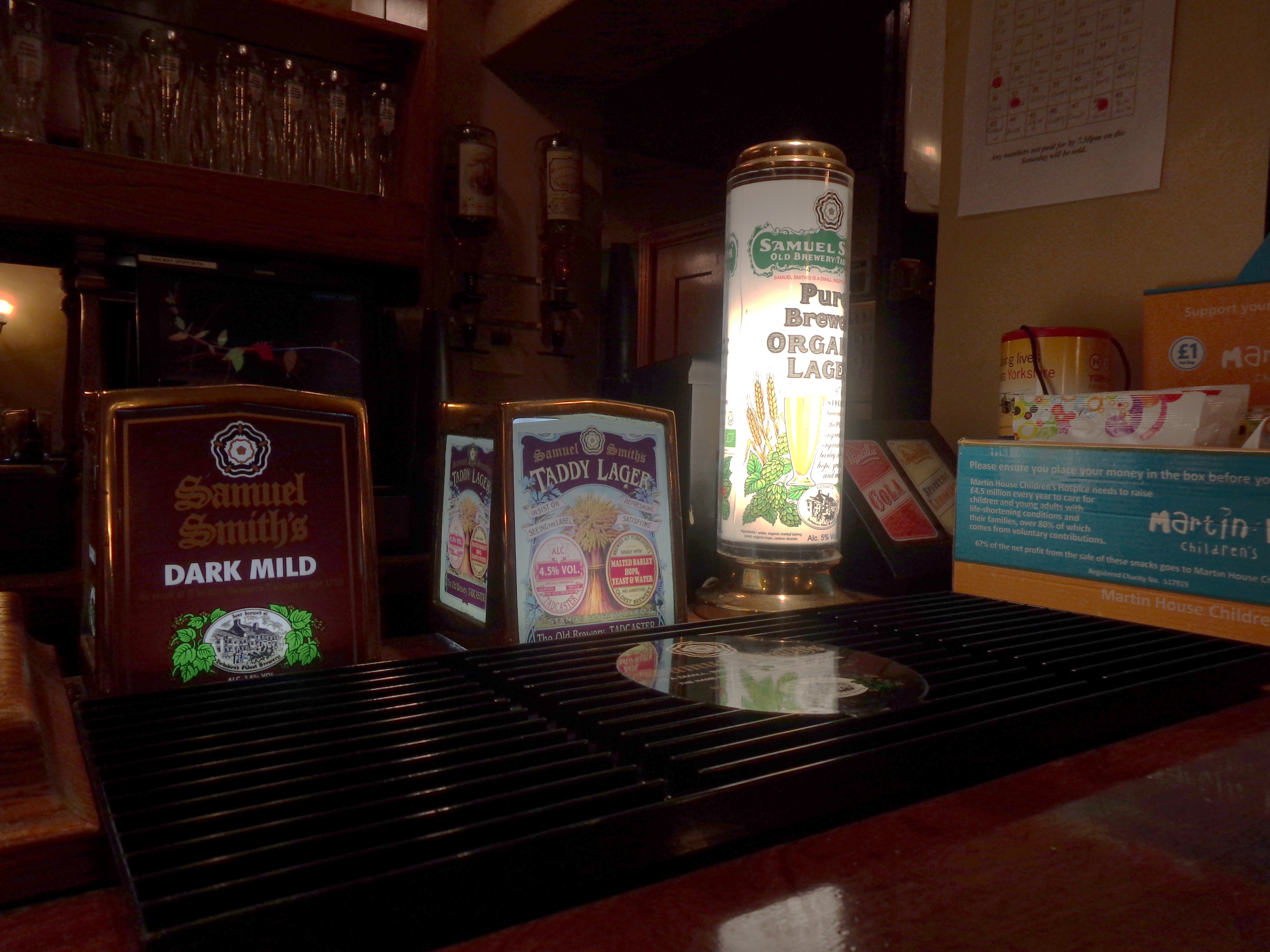
Assorted keg beer taps (Dark Mild, Taddy Lager, Pure Brew Organic Lager)

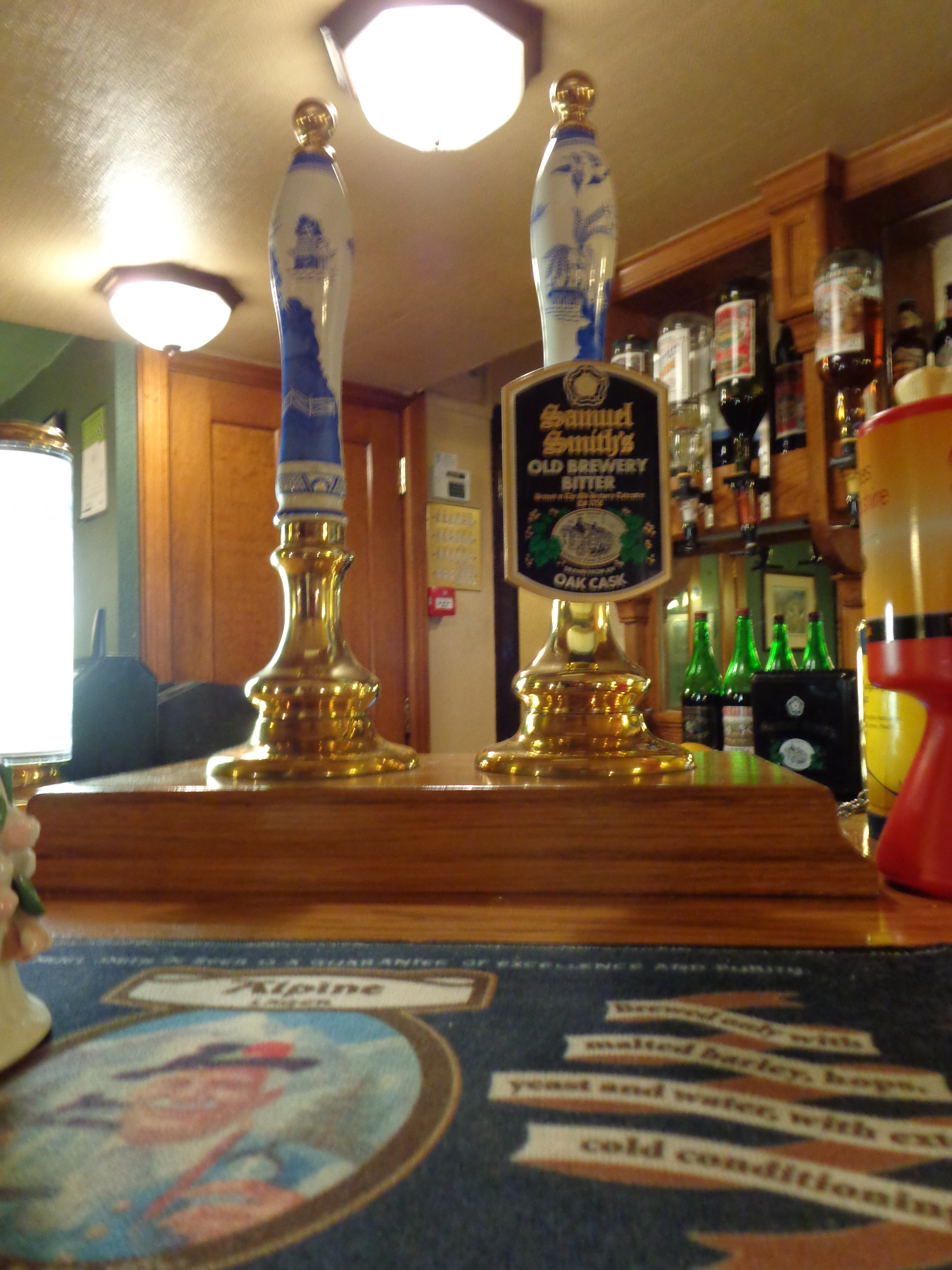
Samuel Smith's Old Brewery Bitter pumps

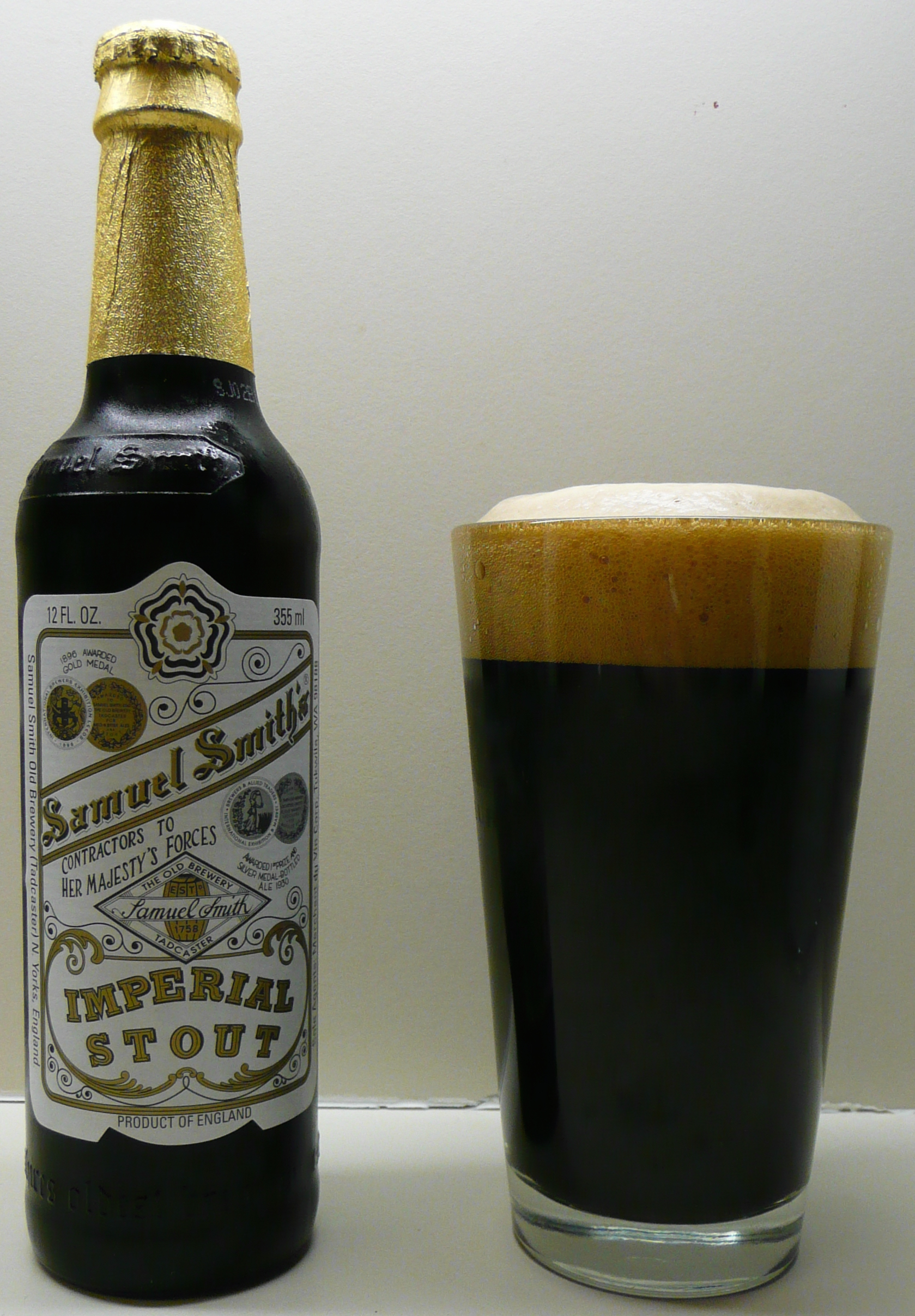
A bottle of Imperial Stout, a vegan beer

Since discontinuing Museum Ale in the early 1990s, Samuel Smith's has brewed only one cask beer, Old Brewery Bitter (OBB). This is unusual in the British brewing industry, as most brewers will either produce a range of real ales or none at all.

The brewery produces a range of conditioned beers. All, with the exception of Old Brewery Bitter and Yorkshire Stingo, are vegan.

In the United States, Samuel Smith's bottled beers are imported by Merchant du Vin, and in Norway, by Strag AS.

Samuel Smith's Organic Cider is available in bottles, while Cider Reserve is sold on draught in the UK. The brewery offers two draught milds, Dark Mild and Light Mild. The brewery used to produce a super strength Barley Wine called Strong Golden at 10.2%. A range of bottled fruit beers are available flavoured with cherry, raspberry, strawberry and apricot.

Best Bitter and Sovereign are the brewery's keg bitters. It introduced Double Four in late 2013, a 4% standard strength lager between Alpine (2.8%) and Taddy Lager (4.5%). A 5% wheat beer has been added to the draught product range.

Until 2006, Samuel Smith's used the brand name Ayingerbräu for its lagers and wheat beers, from the Ayinger Brewery. The pump for Ayingerbräu Lager featured a model of a Bavarian "man in a box".

== Pubs ==
Samuel Smith's operates over 200 pubs, including 20 in central London, which are maintained traditionally. Most have multiple bar rooms, often with a spartan public bar and plusher lounge. Many have frosted windows and stained glass decorations. The interiors often have either brown or beige painted walls, or elaborate wall paper. Some have notable interiors such as the Crown Inn in Wetherby which has furniture by Robert Thompson or the Princess Louise in High Holborn with booths around the bar. Many of the pubs owned by the company, including many that it has acquired since the 1970s, are empty.

The brewery still delivers multiple-trip, reusable bottles in beer crates.

The pubs only sell the brewery's own branded products.

=== Gallery ===
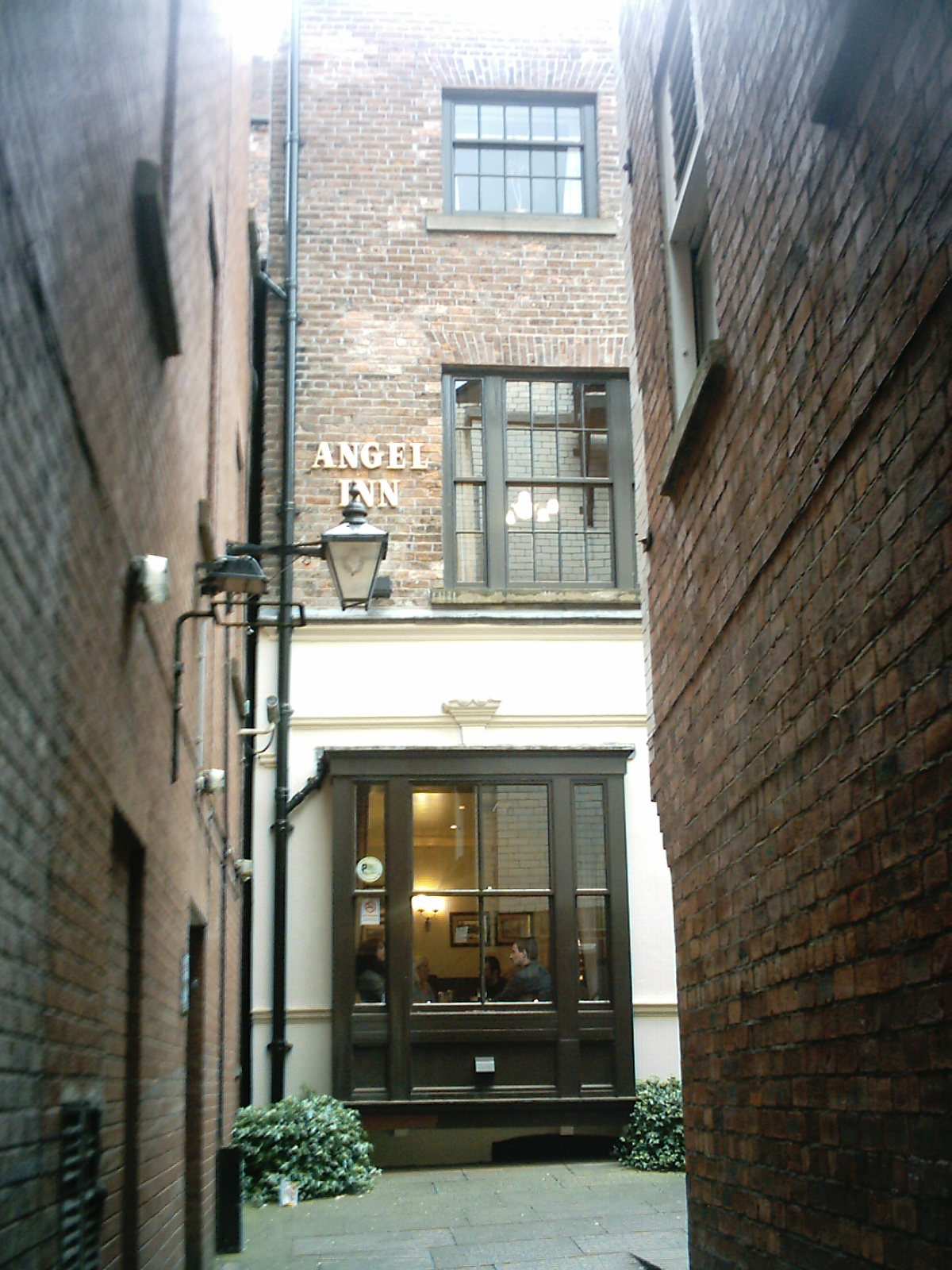
The Angel Inn, Briggate, Leeds

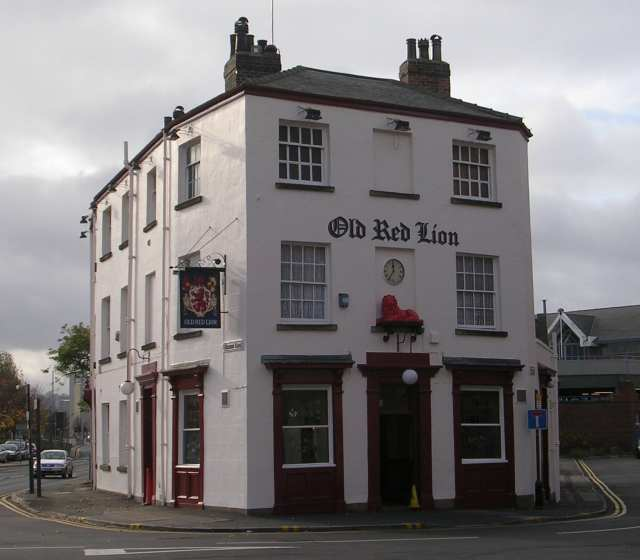
Old Red Lion, Leeds

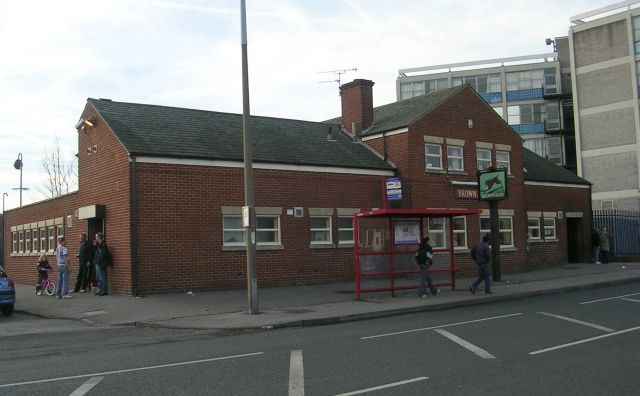
Brown Hare, Harehills, Leeds

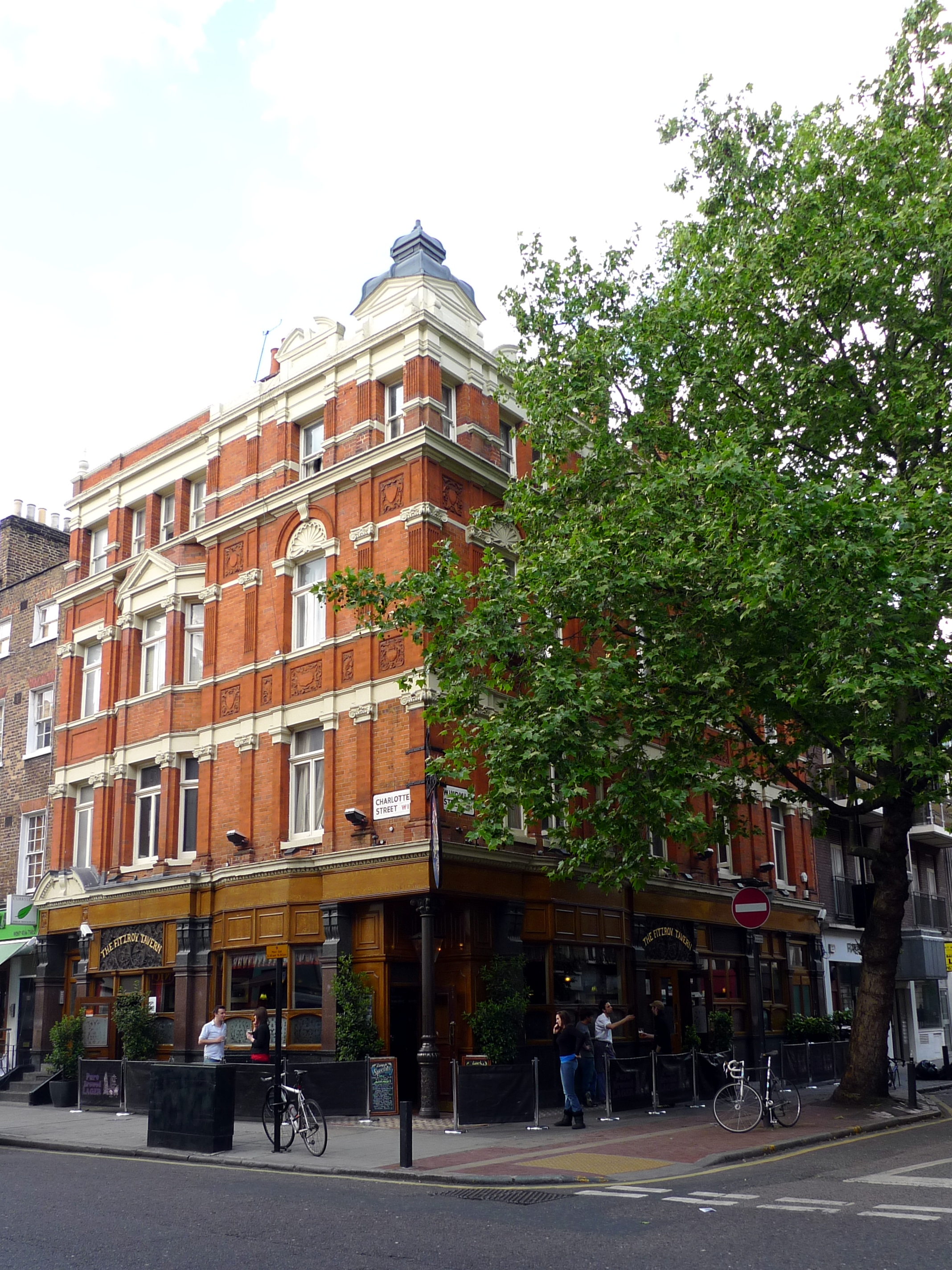
Fitzroy Tavern, London

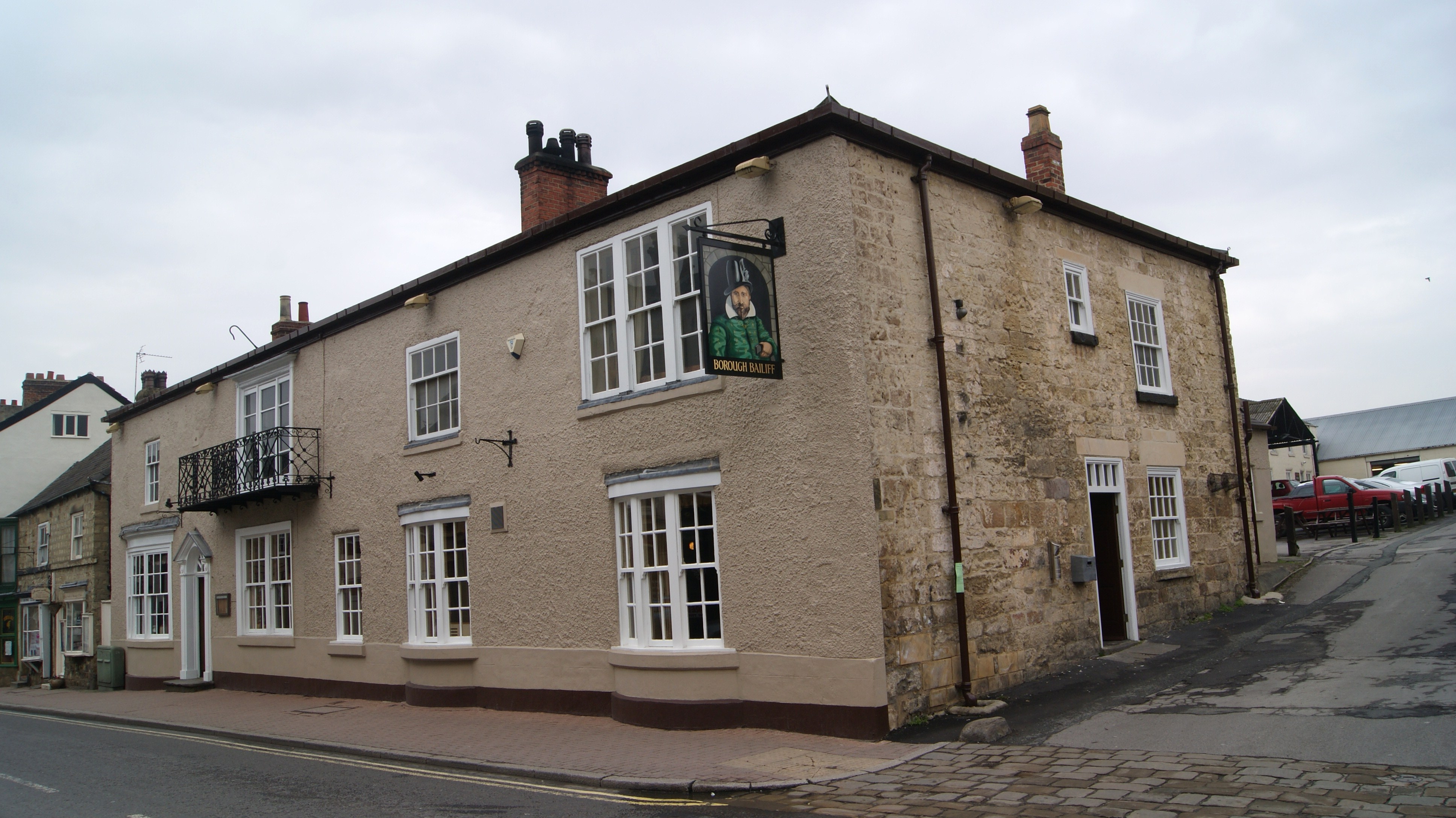
Commercial Hotel, Knaresborough

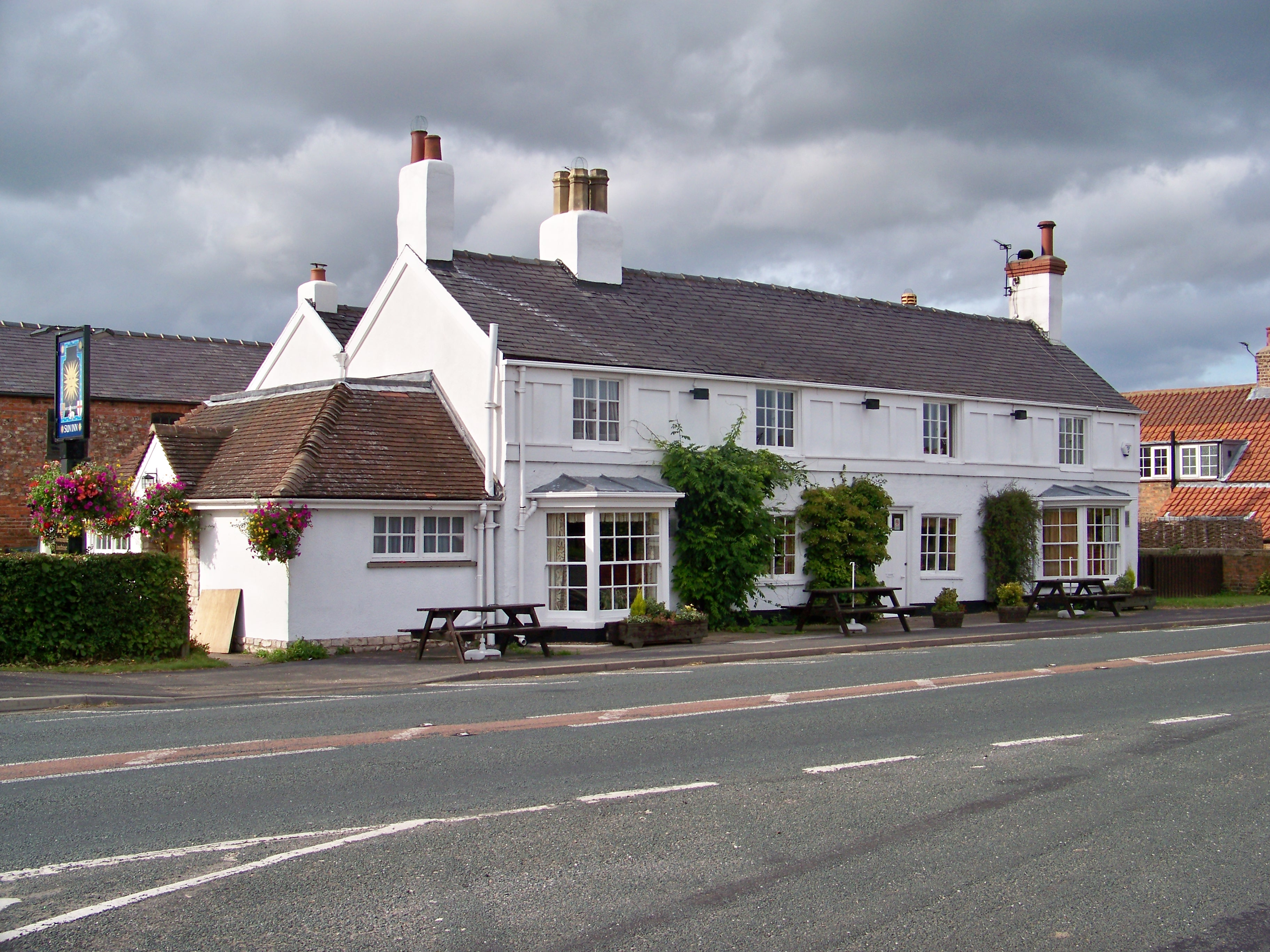
Sun Inn, Long Marston, North Yorkshire

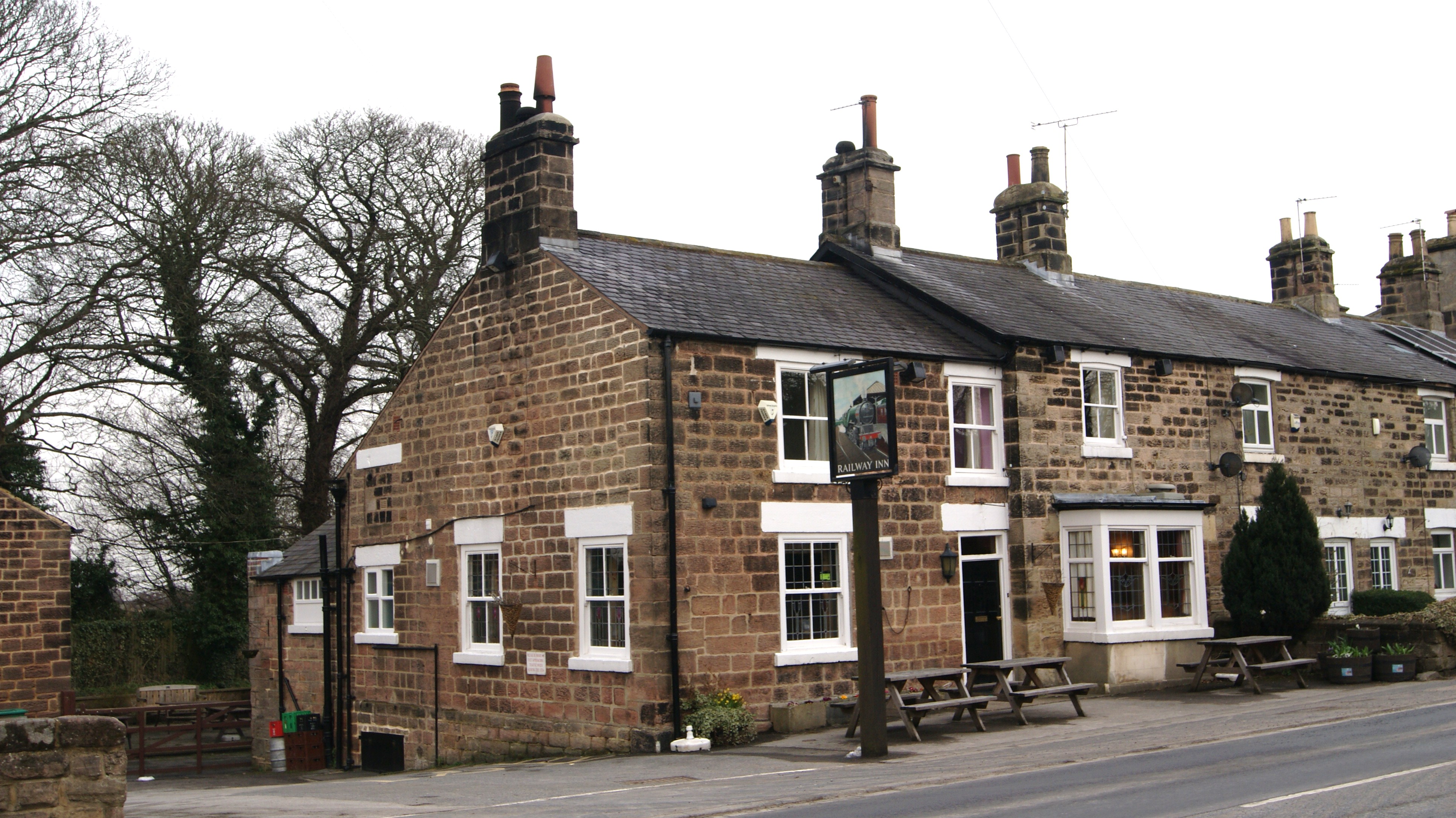
Railway Inn, Spofforth, North Yorkshire

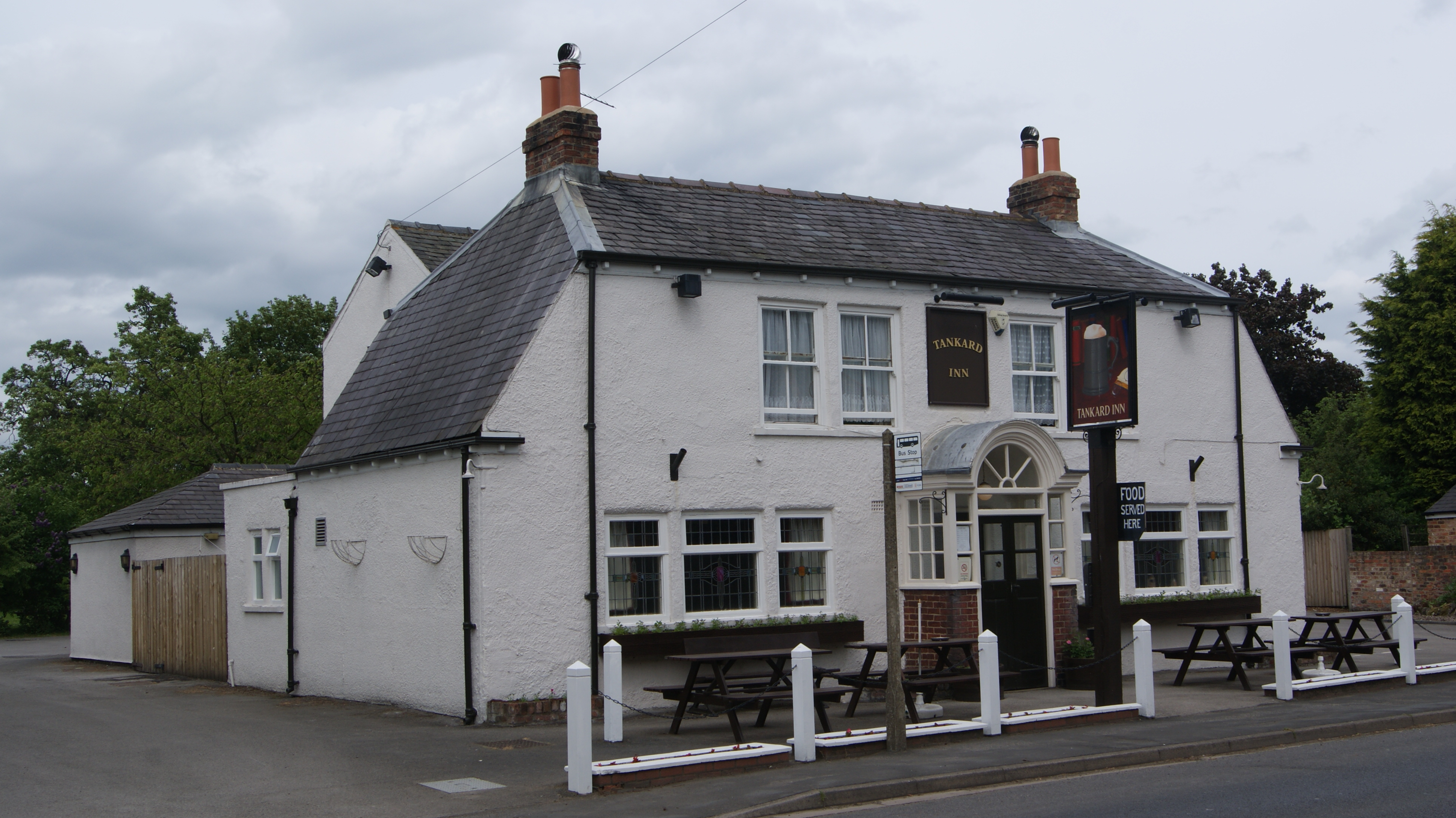
Tankard Inn, Rufforth, North Yorkshire

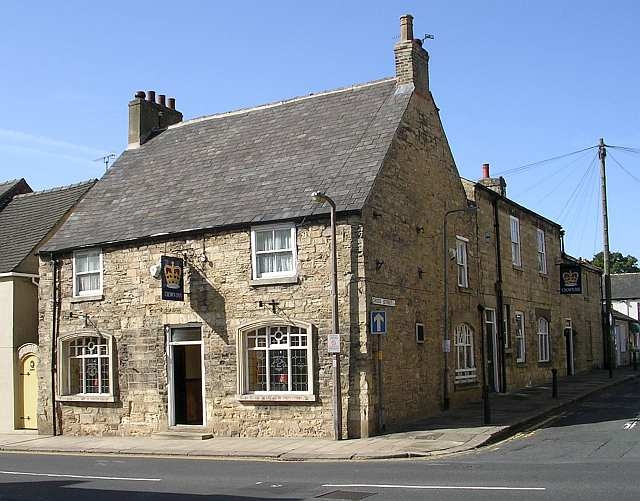
Crown Inn, Wetherby, West Yorkshire

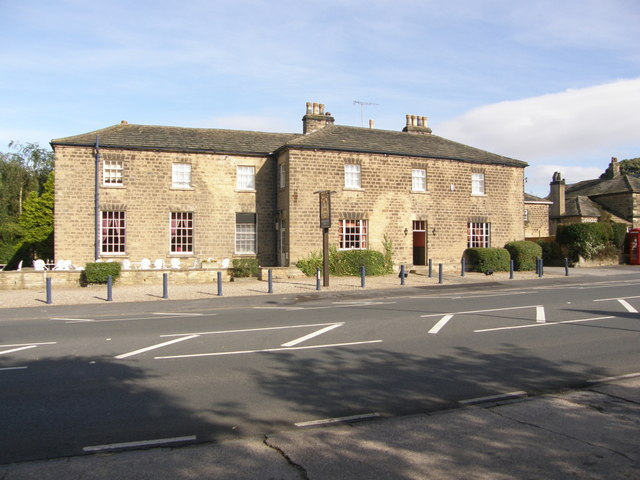
Harewood Arms, Harewood, West Yorkshire

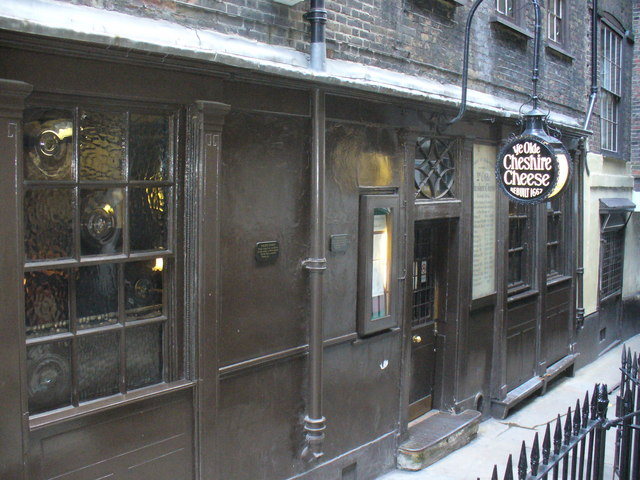
Ye Olde Cheshire Cheese, London

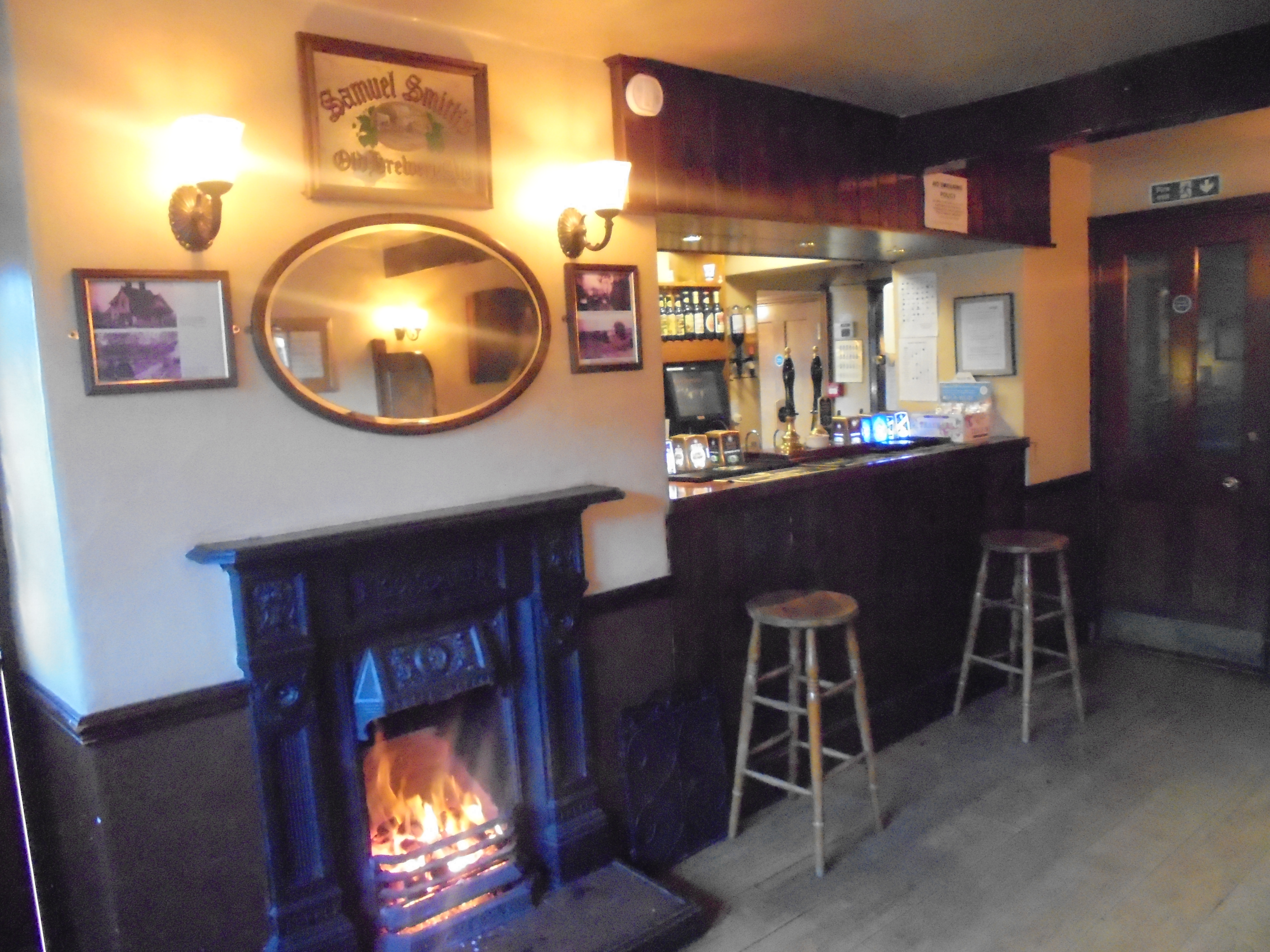
Interior of the Railway Inn, Spofforth

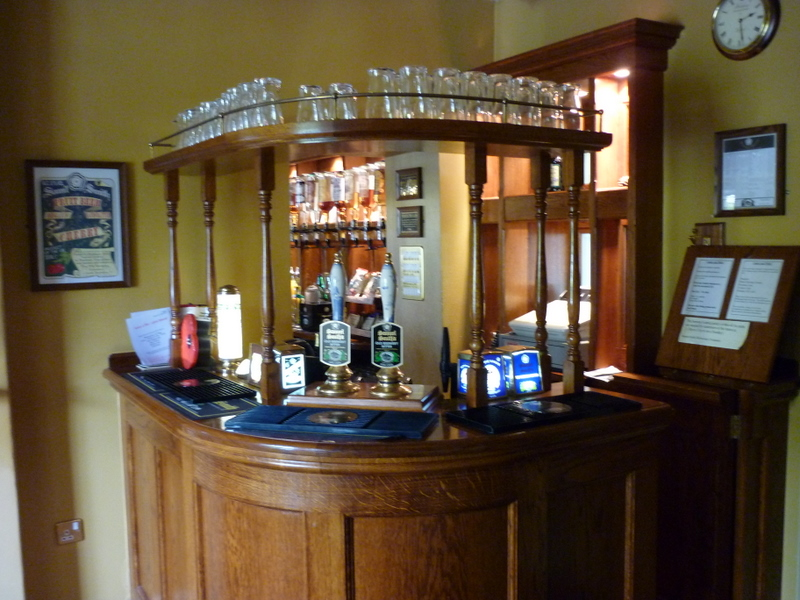
Bar of the Old Star, Clifford, West Yorkshire

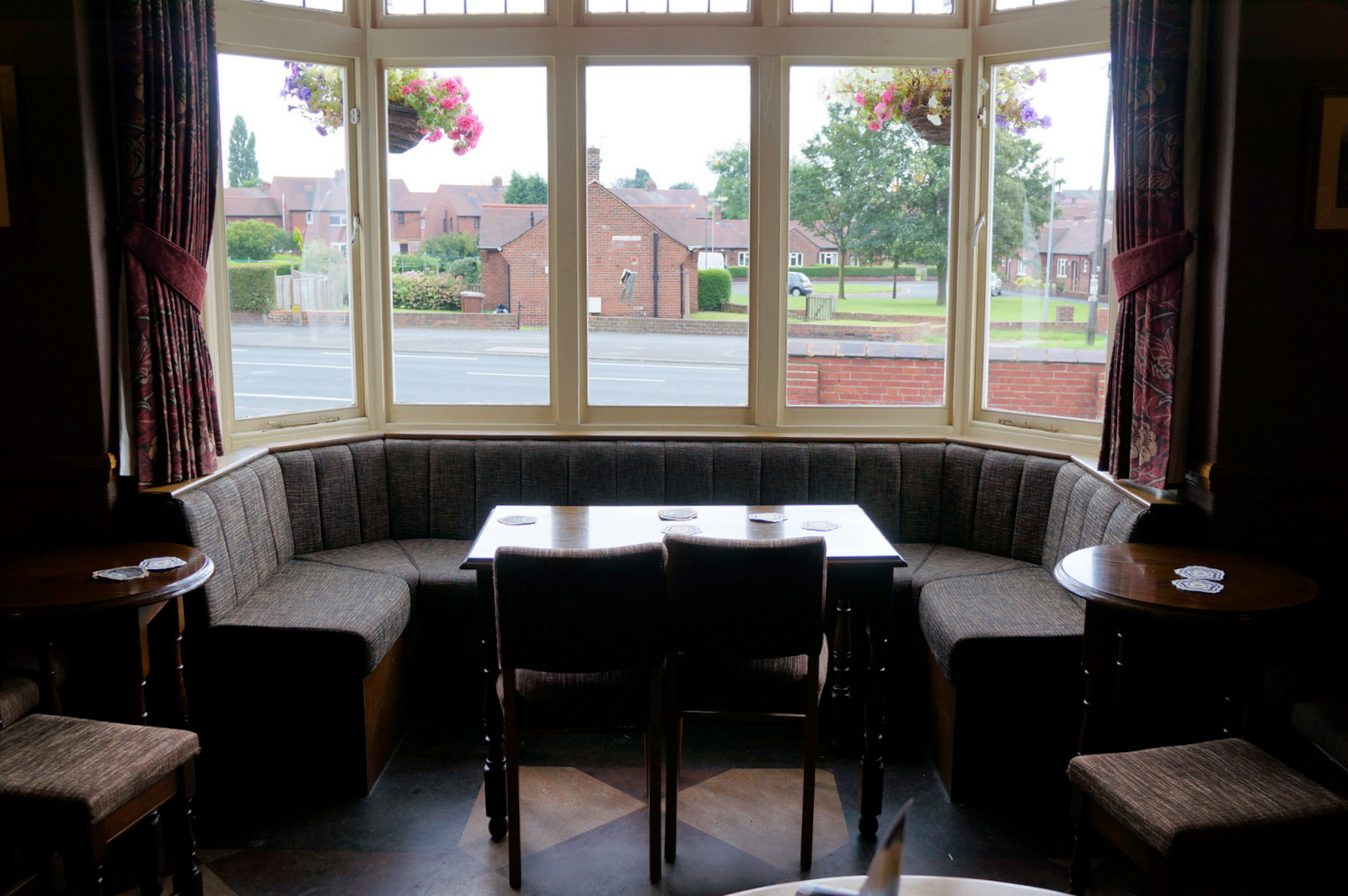
Lounge of the White House in Featherstone, West Yorkshire

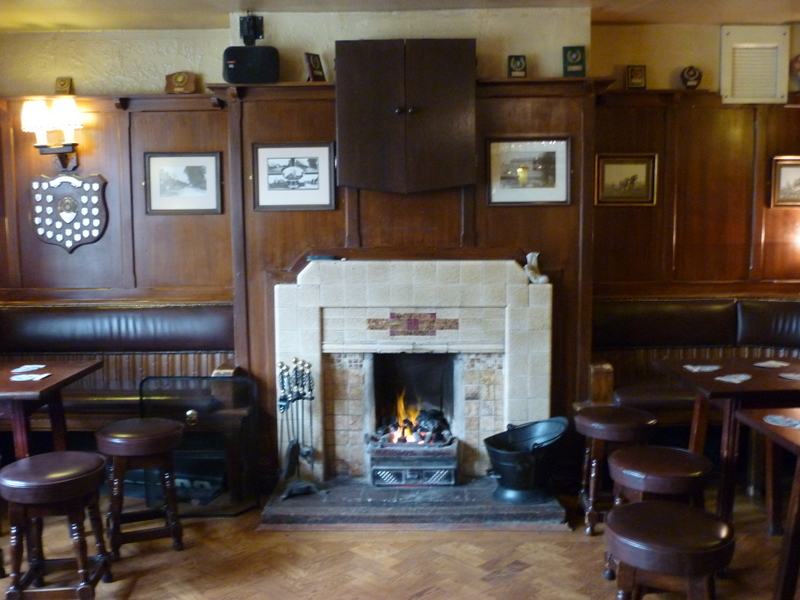
Fire place and dartboard at the Tankard Inn, Rufforth

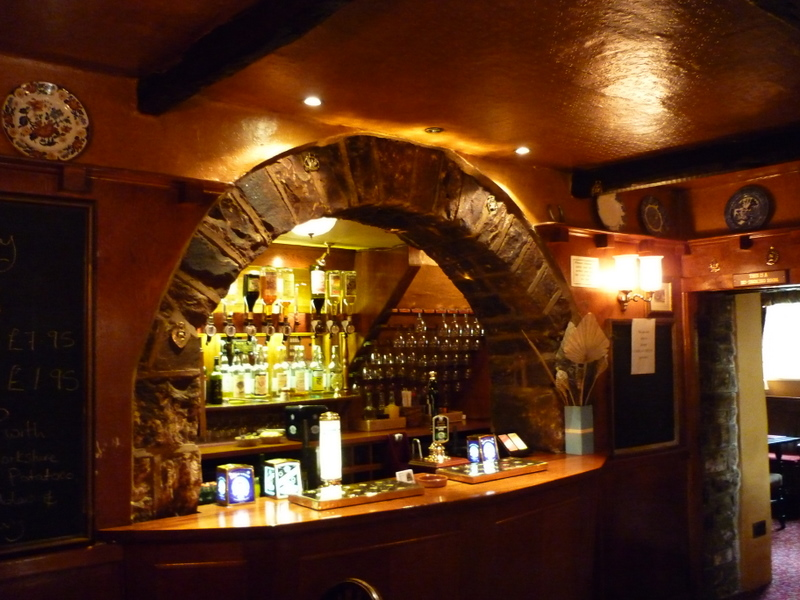
Bar of the Radcliffe Arms, Follifoot, North Yorkshire

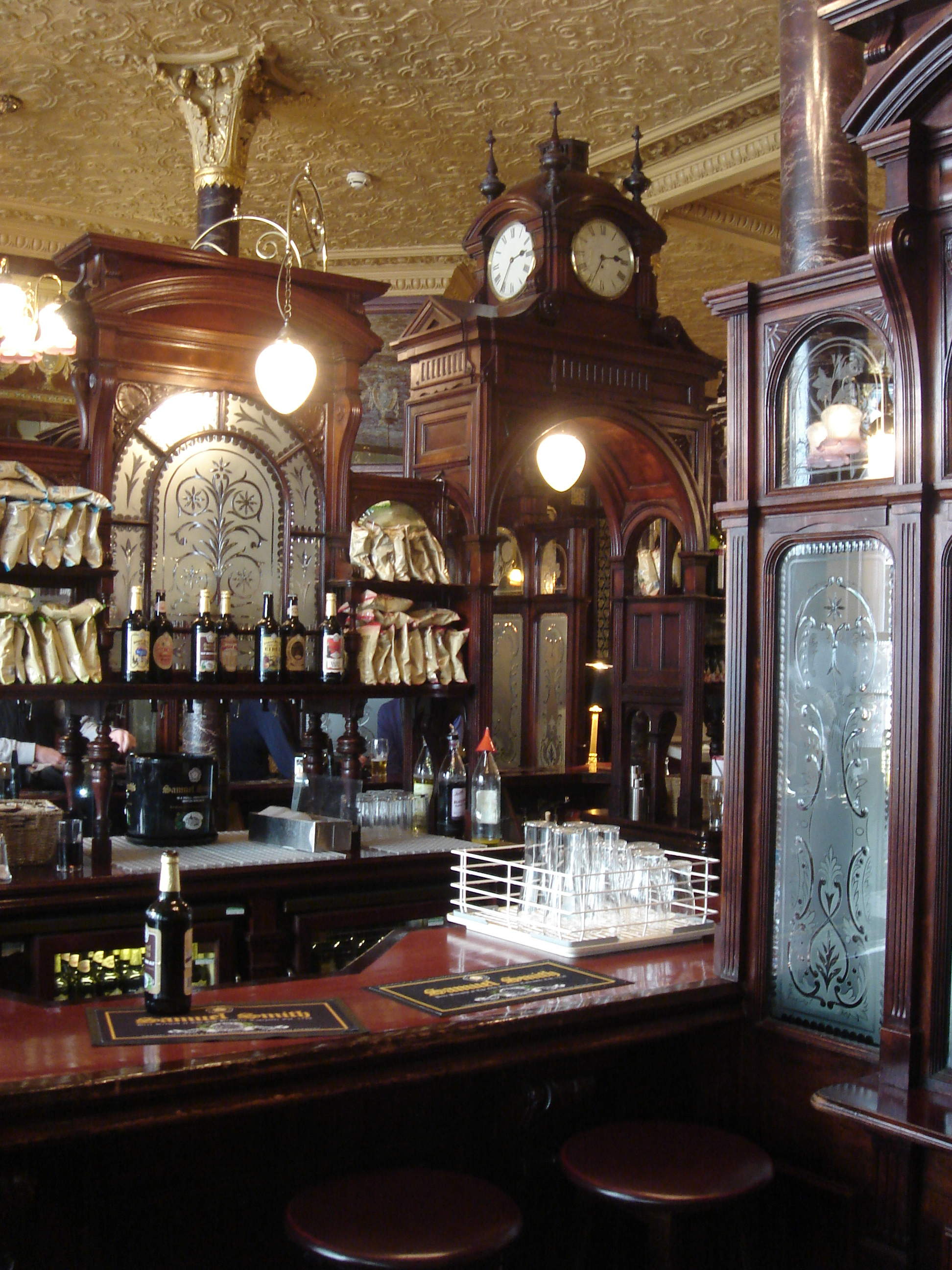
Booth in the Princess Louise, High Holborn, London

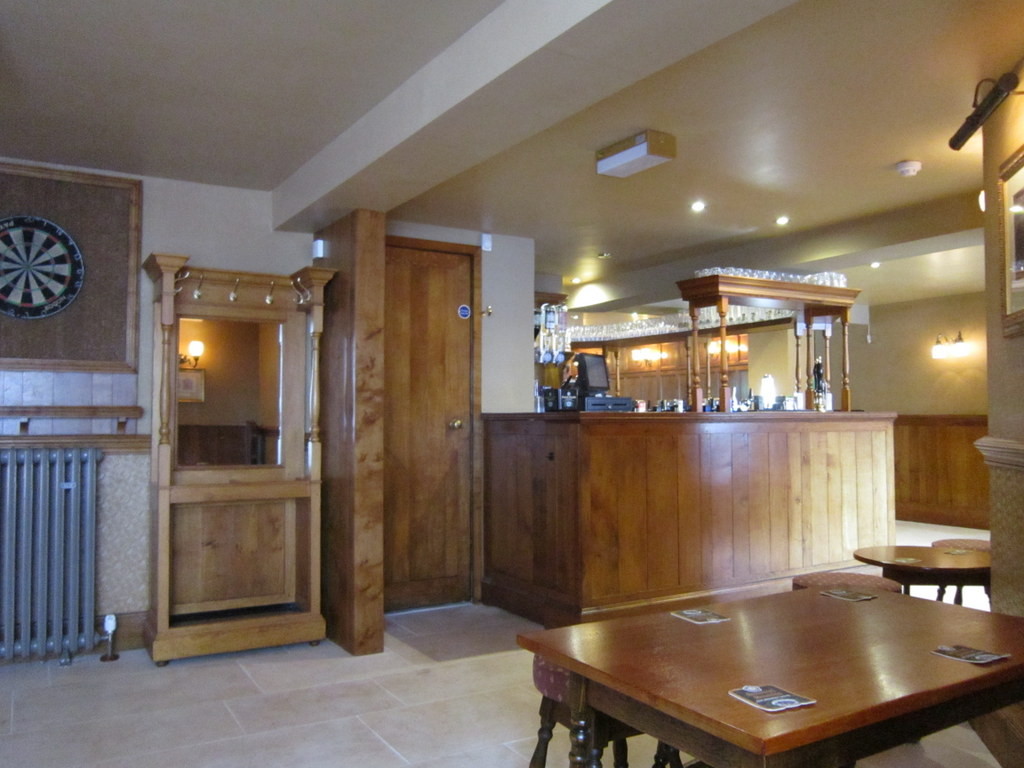
Interior of the Angel and White Horse, Tadcaster, North Yorkshire

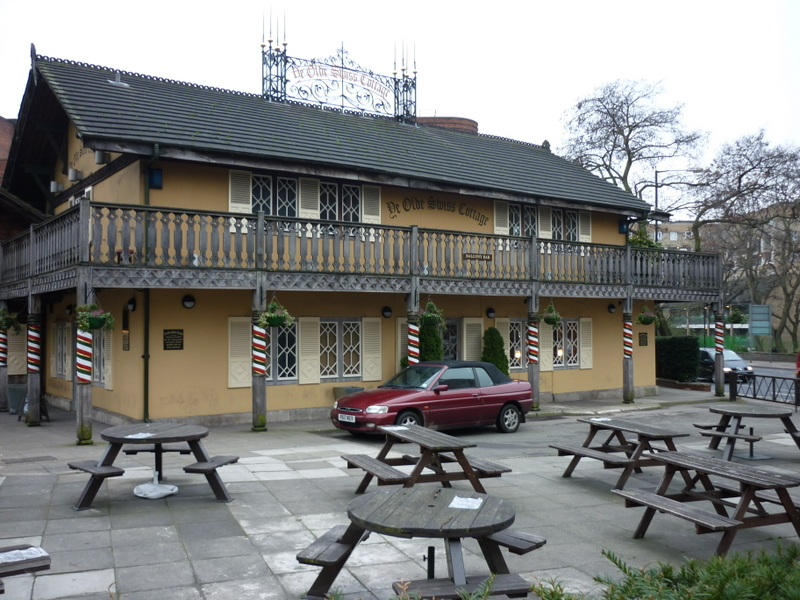
Ye Olde Swiss Cottage, Swiss Cottage, London

== Hotels ==
The company also owns and runs nine hotels under the Samuel Smith's brand name.

== Policies ==
The brewery does not have televisions in its pubs, nor is any music played, reportedly to avoid having to pay PRS fees.

The brewery has a "zero-tolerance" policy to profanity, requiring its employees not to serve customers who use offensive language. It was reported that this was part of a policy to present a traditional, "uncompromisingly Victorian" aesthetic in the brewery's pubs. The pubs also ban the use of mobile phones, tablets, e-books and laptops within indoor areas, with the stated aim of encouraging conversation.

Since 2000, the "publicity-shy" company has dropped the Samuel Smith name across their pubs, with staff also told not to wear Samuel Smith branded t-shirts behind the bar.

In July 2017, the brewery banned motorcyclists from one of its pubs, claiming it would keep "undesirables" out. While discrimination against people on many grounds is illegal, motorcyclists are not a "protected group" under the Equality Act.

== Controversies ==
The brewery is a major landowner in Tadcaster and concerns were expressed in a 2009 edition of BBC Inside Out about its long-term empty properties, and excessive influence in the town. In January 2016, the brewery opposed construction of a temporary bridge over the River Wharfe on its land in Tadcaster, which would have allowed residents to cross following the collapse of the 300-year-old bridge. The brewery claimed the £300,000 cost was a waste of public money. Local councillors urged the brewery to reconsider.

In 2010, the brewery took legal action against Cropton Brewery over the latter's use of the Yorkshire white rose design for its Yorkshire Warrior beer. Mr Justice Arnold ordered Cropton to remove the emblem but criticised both breweries for not settling the matter sooner.

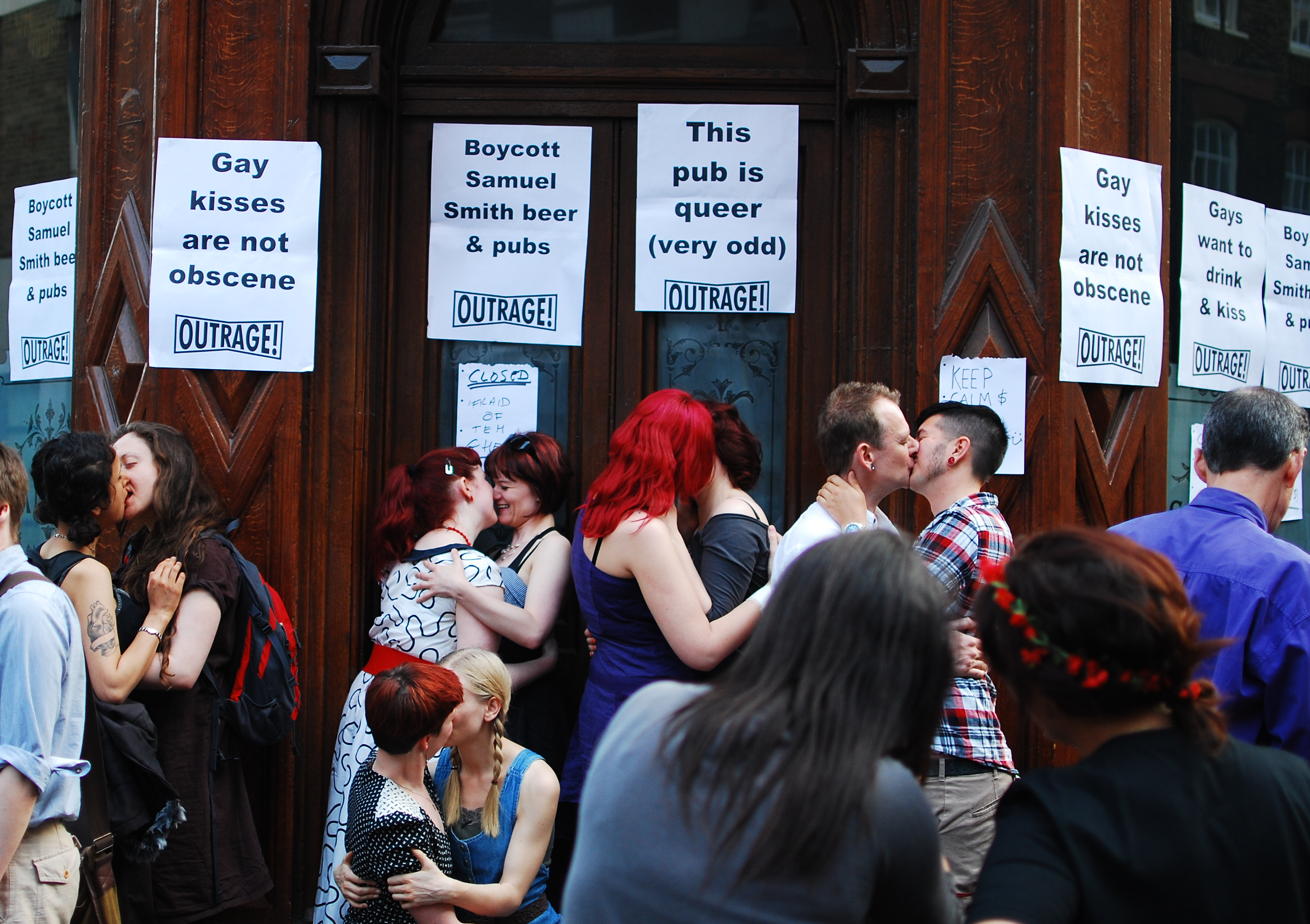
Locals held a "kiss-in" protest event at the John Snow pub in London in 2011, after a gay couple were ejected for kissing

In April 2011, a gay couple were ejected from the brewery's John Snow pub in Soho for kissing, with the landlady calling the couple "obscene". Two other people were also ordered to leave after defending the couple. After learning about a planned "kiss-in" by protestors, the pub closed hours before it took place.

The brewery and owner Humphrey Smith were prosecuted and fined £30,000 after pleading guilty for failing to provide information regarding staff pension funds. The judge ruled Smith had been "deliberately inflammatory" in his response to a request in 2015 from The Pensions Regulator, calling its request for evidence of the brewery's fiscal responsibility to its staff pension fund "tiresome".

In April 2019, the sudden closure of the Berkeley Hotel in Scunthorpe left a family stranded ten minutes before a funeral wake, forcing a last-minute relocation to nearby Heslam Park. This incident, involving the abrupt shuttering of the venue by owners Samuel Smith's Brewery, displaced 50 guests.

During the COVID-19 pandemic, the brewery was criticised by councillors in Wakefield for ordering pub staff not to implement a test and trace system in its pubs.

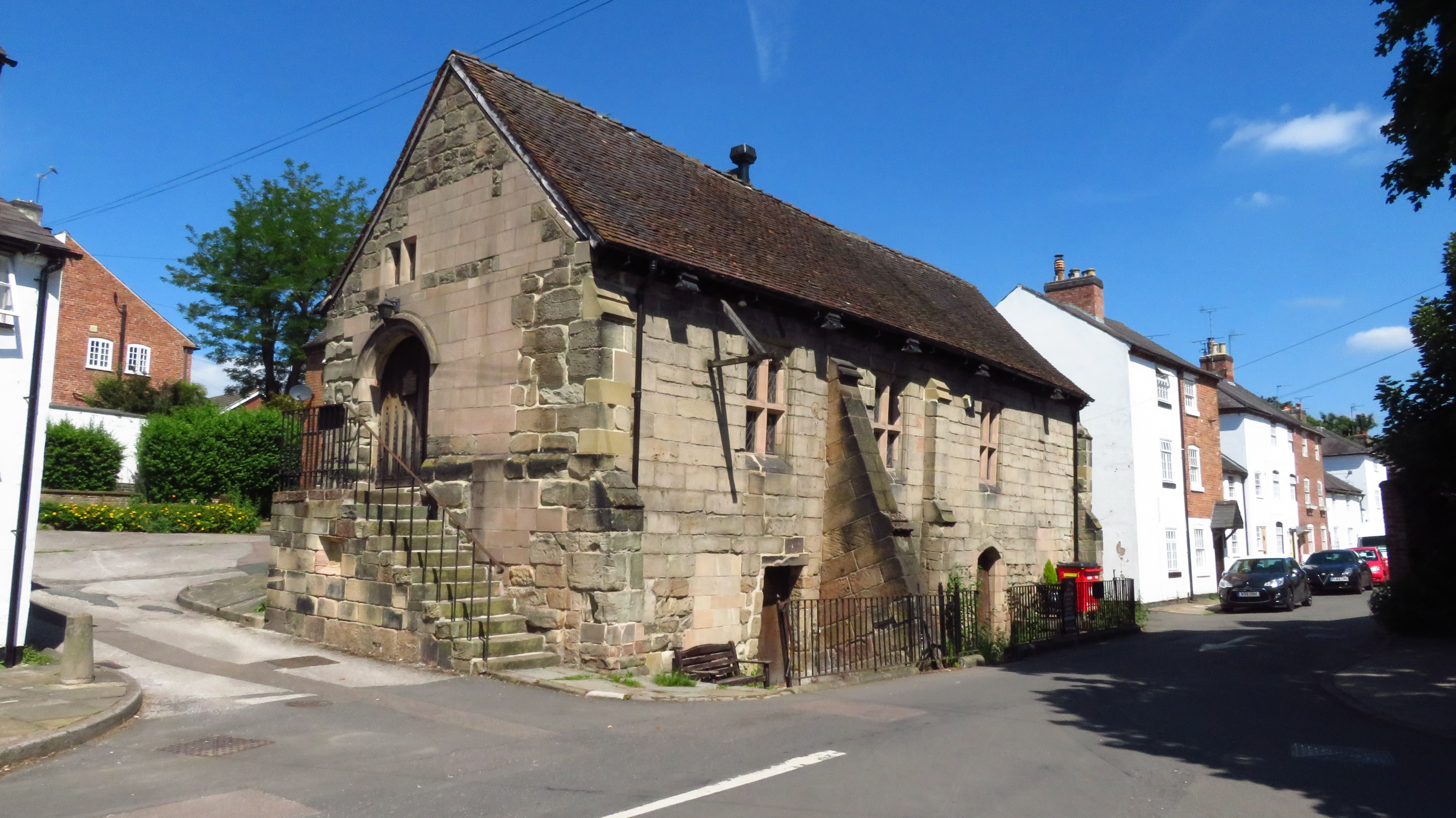
The Abbey pub in Darley Abbey, during its closure. The pub was left empty for several years.

In 2021, residents and their representatives in Darley Abbey petitioned the brewery to protect its 15th-century Grade II listed Abbey pub that was falling into disrepair. It had been left empty since 2019. It was announced in September 2024 that the pub would reopen that month. In May 2025, The Abbey was shut down with no notice. A notice on the pub's front door read "Closed!! Due to someone posting pictures of the Abbey on social media. Sam Smith has taken the alcohol and closed these premises." It reopened with new landlords in June 2025.

=== Dismissal of staff ===
Most UK pubs owned by breweries in the UK are "tied"; publicans sell only the owner's beer, but are independent tenants free to make their own decisions. In September 1984 Samuel Smith made its pub managers salaried employees, without their former freedoms. The National Union of Licensed Victuallers, representing pub landlords, objected that its members had to choose between leaving their homes and jobs, or taking direct orders from the company, but the change was implemented. One reason given for the many pubs owned by Samuel Smith remaining closed is the difficulty of finding managers willing to accept the arbitrary rules of Humphrey Smith.

The GMB trade union has long criticised the brewery for its dismissal of pub managers.

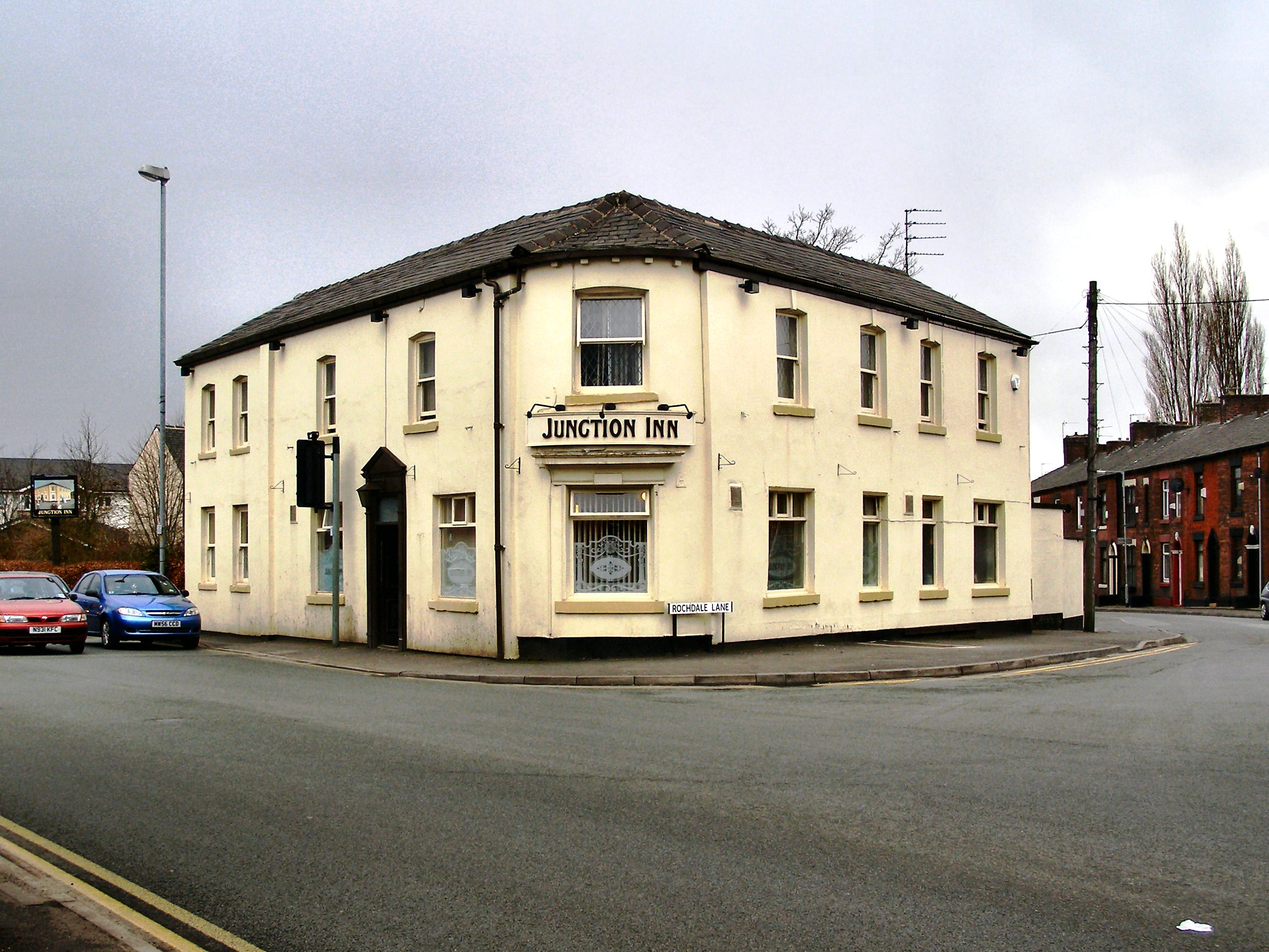
The Junction Inn in Royton was closed over concerns that staff were serving too much beer in each glass

On New Year's Eve 2011, the brewery closed the Junction Inn in Royton claiming that staff were pouring beers with less than the recommended 5% of head, and subsequently issued a retrospective £10,733 surcharge for excess stock served over a 12-year period.

In August 2020, after the Cow and Calf pub in Grenoside near Sheffield was unable to serve him his favourite dessert Humphrey Smith dismissed the managers and closed it, although the managers said that it was because they had not been provided with a freezer.

Some dismissed managers have made claims of unfair dismissal with employment tribunals, but most represent themselves due to the cost of employing a lawyer; and under UK law employees have no recourse for unfair dismissal unless they have been employed for two years. The brewery employs lawyers, and wins about two-thirds of the cases. However, in one example where the brewery lost, the ex-managers of a Samuel Smith pub in Nunthorpe in 2022 won a constructive dismissal case against the brewery after they had been charged thousands of pounds for alleged stock shortages, with the judge ruling the company culture is "not one that encourage[s] managers to raise objections even if they thought they were being unfairly treated" and ordering it pay £20,000 damages to the ex-managers.

== See also ==
- British regional breweries using wooden casks
