= Grapes Inn, Heywood =

Former pub in Greater Manchester, England

Grapes Inn
- The pub in 2012

- Location within Greater Manchester

General information
- Status: On the market
- Type: Public house (former)
- Location: 31 Peel Lane, Heywood, Greater Manchester, England
- Coordinates: 53.5963°N 2.2288°W
- Year built: 1926; 100 years ago
- Closed: 2026
- Owner: Samuel Smith's

The Grapes Inn is a former public house on Peel Lane in Heywood, a town within the Metropolitan Borough of Rochdale, Greater Manchester, England. Built in 1926 as part of the Back o'th' Moss housing estate, it is noted by the Campaign for Real Ale (CAMRA) for an interior of "outstanding national historic importance", rated three stars in its national inventory. The pub closed in summer 2025, and Samuel Smith's has since placed the property on the market.

== History ==
The public house was constructed in 1926 as part of the Back o'th' Moss housing estate in Heywood, developed during the interwar period. The building is absent from both the 1929 and 1938 Ordnance Survey maps, despite the documentary evidence for its construction. No explanation for the difference between the mapping and documentary records has been identified.

The Grapes Inn is regarded by the Campaign for Real Ale (CAMRA) as having an interior of "outstanding national historic importance" and is rated three stars in its grading scheme. CAMRA records the pub as having closed in summer 2025. Samuel Smith's has since placed the property on the market, and no reason for the closure has been made public. As of March 2026, the freehold remains in the brewery's ownership.

== Architecture ==
East elevation on the right, with the south elevation, viewed from George Street in 2012

=== Exterior ===
The building faces north and occupies an acutely triangular plot, with Peel Lane forming the western side, George Street the eastern side, and Bank Top Street along the southern edge. Its plan is an almost square U‑shape, with each wing angled to follow the line of the adjoining streets. It is built in brick with stone sills and lintels on the first floor and stone surrounds to the ground‑floor windows, and has a pitched slate roof.

The front elevation has seven bays. Bays 1, 2, 6 and 7 are set within two gable ends, each containing a chimney rising from ground level to the roof. Each gable end has four two‑light casement windows, two on each floor, arranged on either side of the chimney. The main entrance has an overlight and is flanked by two pairs of narrow tripartite casements. The central section of the elevation includes a first‑floor balcony with two doors and three casement windows.

The east and west elevations are identical, each with a central doorway and overlight, flanked by two six‑light bow windows, and three three‑light casements on the first floor. To the rear are single‑storey lean‑to additions with slate roofs and an enclosed yard.

=== Interior ===
The entrance from the car park leads into a porch lined with turquoise wall tiles and a mosaic floor. A second porch on the east side, no longer used, has the same treatment. From the car‑park porch, an inner door opens into the main lobby bar. Around the entrances to the gents' and ladies' are two small leaded screens from the 1920s, an unusually complete survival. A short L‑shaped screen stands beside a former phone point; this screen once formed part of a larger enclosure for the off‑sales hatch, which originally faced the east side door so that customers, especially children, could be served without seeing into the bar.

The lobby bar keeps its original counter, now with a later top, and the bar‑back has been partly altered. The room to the right of the bar was reduced in size when a new passage was created to reach the west side door. It has a mix of original and later fixed seating, bell pushes above, and a fireplace refitted with modern tiles.

The vault in the south‑east corner has simple bench seating, an original counter and a draught screen by the door, though its fireplace has gone. The pool room in the north‑east corner has draught screens, plain etched windows from the 1920s, fixed bench seating that appears original, and bell pushes above; its fireplace has also been removed.

The gents' retains a black‑and‑white tiled floor, original wall tiling in cream, red and black to two‑thirds height, a high‑level cistern by Gratrix Jnr & Bro Ltd of Manchester, and a set of four original urinals. The etched glass panel in its door has been lost, though the ladies' still has its own.
