= Tankard Inn =

Pub in North Yorkshire, England

- The pub in 2021, during a period of closure
- Alternative names: The Tankard

General information
- Type: Public house; originally a house
- Location: Wetherby Road, Rufforth, North Yorkshire, England
- Coordinates: 53°57′19″N 1°11′38″W
- Year built: Early 19th century
- Renovated: 1937 (remodelled)
- Owner: Samuel Smith's

Renovating team
- Architect: H. Lane Fox

The Tankard Inn is a public house on Wetherby Road in Rufforth, a village in the City of York, England. Dating from the early 19th century and originally a house, it was remodelled in 1937 by architect H. Lane Fox for Samuel Smith's. The Campaign for Real Ale (CAMRA) rates its interior as of "very special national historic importance" with a two‑star grading. The local Historic Environment Record describes it as a community asset, though it is not a statutory asset of community value. The pub has experienced several closures and changes of management since 2019, reopening most recently in July 2026.

== History ==
The building dates from the early 19th century and is thought to have begun as a house before later enlargement. As Rufforth's only public house, it was extensively altered in 1937 when Samuel Smith's Brewery commissioned Leeds architect H. Lane Fox to remodel it. The Tankard Inn is regarded by the Campaign for Real Ale (CAMRA) as having an interior of "very special national historic importance" and is rated two stars in its grading scheme.

The local Historic Environment Record describes the Tankard Inn as a "community asset" and notes that it was put forward for inclusion on the Local List of Heritage Assets, although it is not designated as a statutory asset of community value as of October 2026.

The pub closed at Easter 2019 and remained shut for almost a year while Samuel Smith's sought new management, despite a recent refurbishment. It reopened in June 2023 under new tenants, but the tenancy ended after three months, with the brewery citing low sales; the managers stated that plans to introduce food could not proceed without investment in the kitchen. After another period of closure, the pub reopened in July 2026 under new management.

== Architecture ==
=== Exterior ===
The building is a two‑storey structure with white render and a hipped roof of slate, the side slopes extending partway down the walls. There are chimneys at each end of the ridge. The ground floor has three bays, with a central entrance flanked by sets of three casement windows, the middle window in each group being slightly wider than the outer ones. The first floor contains two pairs of sash windows, and the left elevation has two additional casements. A shallow rectangular panel is recessed into the upper façade; the site of a former sign. To the rear are both two‑storey and single‑storey extensions, although their form is not clearly visible from the street.

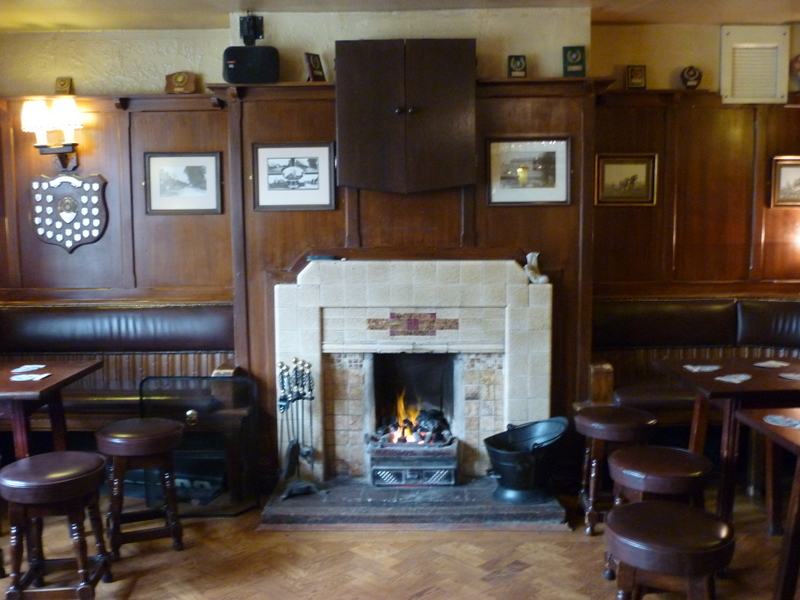
The interior in 2011

=== Interior ===
The 1937 alterations created a compact two‑room layout that has changed little and is regarded as a good example of pub planning of the period. The central corridor was enlarged to form the public bar, given a modest Tudor treatment, and both rooms were fitted with matching three‑light leaded windows that set the 1930s character. Much of the pre‑war refurbishment survives, including the curving bar counter, bench seating and contemporary doors, although the lounge fittings and some of the wall panelling may be later additions.
