= Elizabeth Justice =

British author (1703–1752)

- Born: 1703
- Died: 1752 (aged 48–49)
- Occupation: writer
- Spouse: Henry Justice
- Writing career
- Genres: travel and autobiography

Elizabeth Justice born Elizabeth Surby (1703 – 1752) was a British writer. Her husband's obsession with books destroyed their lives and their marriage. After he was sentenced to be transported she turned to writing about her time in Russia as the first governess and the problems that her husband had caused her. She is said to be the first woman to write of her travels to Russia.

== Life ==
She was born in 1703. The day and location are unknown but her parents were Ann (born Ellis) and Dorset Surby and they lived in Hatton Garden in London. She married a lawyer named Henry Justice when she was sixteen. Her husband had been educated at Trinity College, Cambridge, he was Lord of the Manor of Rufforth and he had been called to the bar in 1727. Her husband's obsession with books destroyed their marriage. He would spend all of their money on books. Eventually he settled £25 per year to be put aside for their upkeep but it was insufficient.

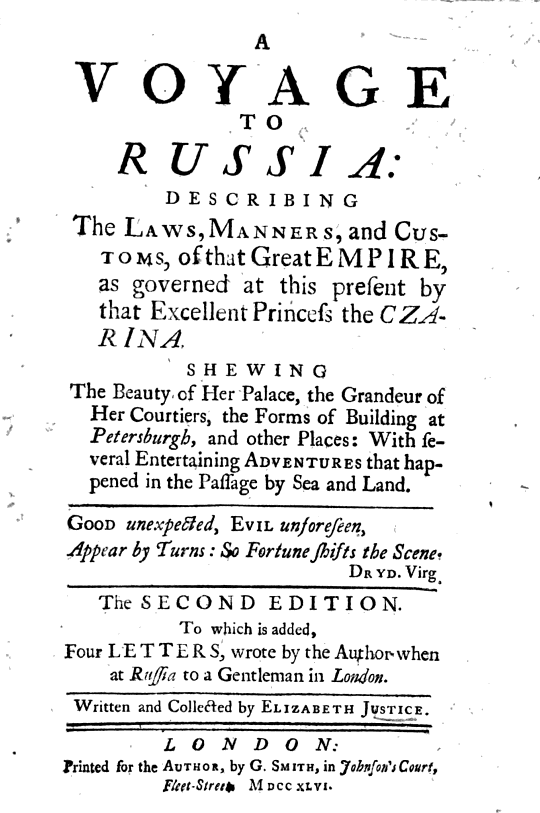
A later edition of her 1739 book - with "the four letters"

Justice's first time in print was unpaid and without her permission. The notorious publisher Edmund Curll had managed to obtain four letters that she had written to a friend in London whilst she was in St Petersburg. The letters were interesting and he was unscrupulous. He published them in "Mr. Pope's Literary Correspondence" in 1737.

Justice wrote A Voyage to Russia and it was published in 1739. The book describes how she became the first governess in Russia. She had agreed to become the governess to the three daughters of Hill Green who was a British merchant working in St Petersburg. She was obliged to travel that far because she did not speak French and that was considered essential for a British governess. In the introduction to her book about Russia she makes it clear that she is publishing the book because of her husband's refusal to pay her an annuity. The book gives an unusual insight into life in Russia as viewed by an observer who was a woman and who was not an aristocrat. The book was republished in 1746 with the four letters that had been published without her permission in 1737. The book has been republished several times since. She is said to be the first woman to write of her travels to Russia.

Justice had to return from Russia because of her husband's bibliophilia in 1737. He had stolen dozens of valuable books from the Cambridge University Library and he was placed on trial at the Old Bailey on 8 May 1736. He was found guilty and spared transportation but he was sentenced to be exiled for life. Henry went to live in Italy and died in 1763 at The Hague.

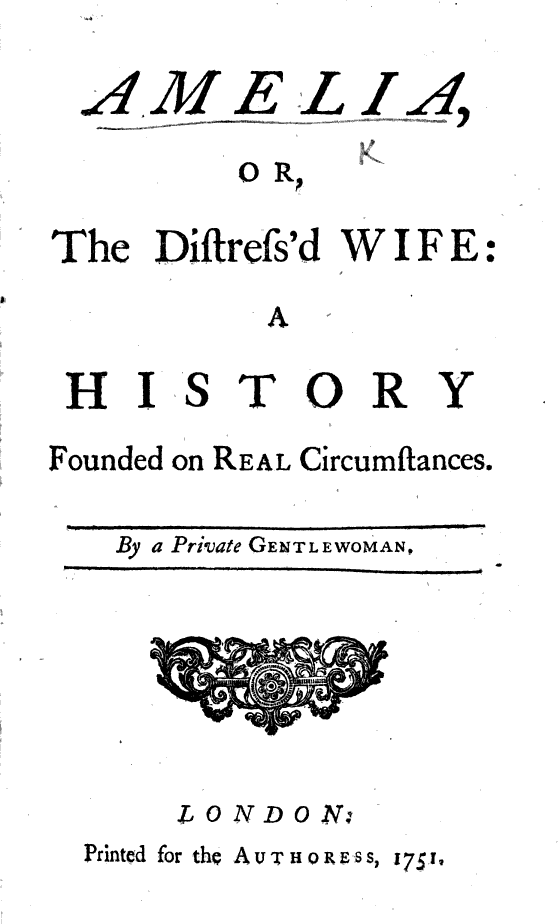
Amelia by Elizabeth Justice

She wrote the book, Amelia, Or, the Distress'd Wife: A History Founded on Real Circumstances. By a Private Gentlewoman, and it was published in 1751. It was nominally a novel but it was a thinly veiled autobiography and much of the detail of her life comes from this book. Amelia tells the story of Amelia Johnson who marries and then finds that her husband holds all the power in their marriage. He uses her money which became his to buy books that Amelia thinks are worthless. He claims that he bought them cheaply and will do them up and make a handsome profit - but he doesn't. He takes her children and offers her £100 a year but then changes that to £25 p.a. The heroine has to take her husband to court and wins. However he threatens to counter-sue. In the end, Amelia writes a book about a journey to Russia and then writes the very book the reader is reading.

It is thought that her reason for publication was financial. She died in the following year. Her book Amelia was published in the same year as Henry Fielding's novel of the same name. Fielding's novel attracted more than usual attention as it was at the centre of the Paper War of 1752–1753. Moreover, the underlying stories of both novels are similar as they both involve a "distressed wife".

== Selected works ==
- A Voyage to Russia, 1739
- Amelia, Or, the Distress'd Wife: A History Founded on Real Circumstances. By a Private Gentlewoman, 1751
