= Rufforth =

Village in North Yorkshire, England

Coordinates: 53.95591°N 1.19379°W

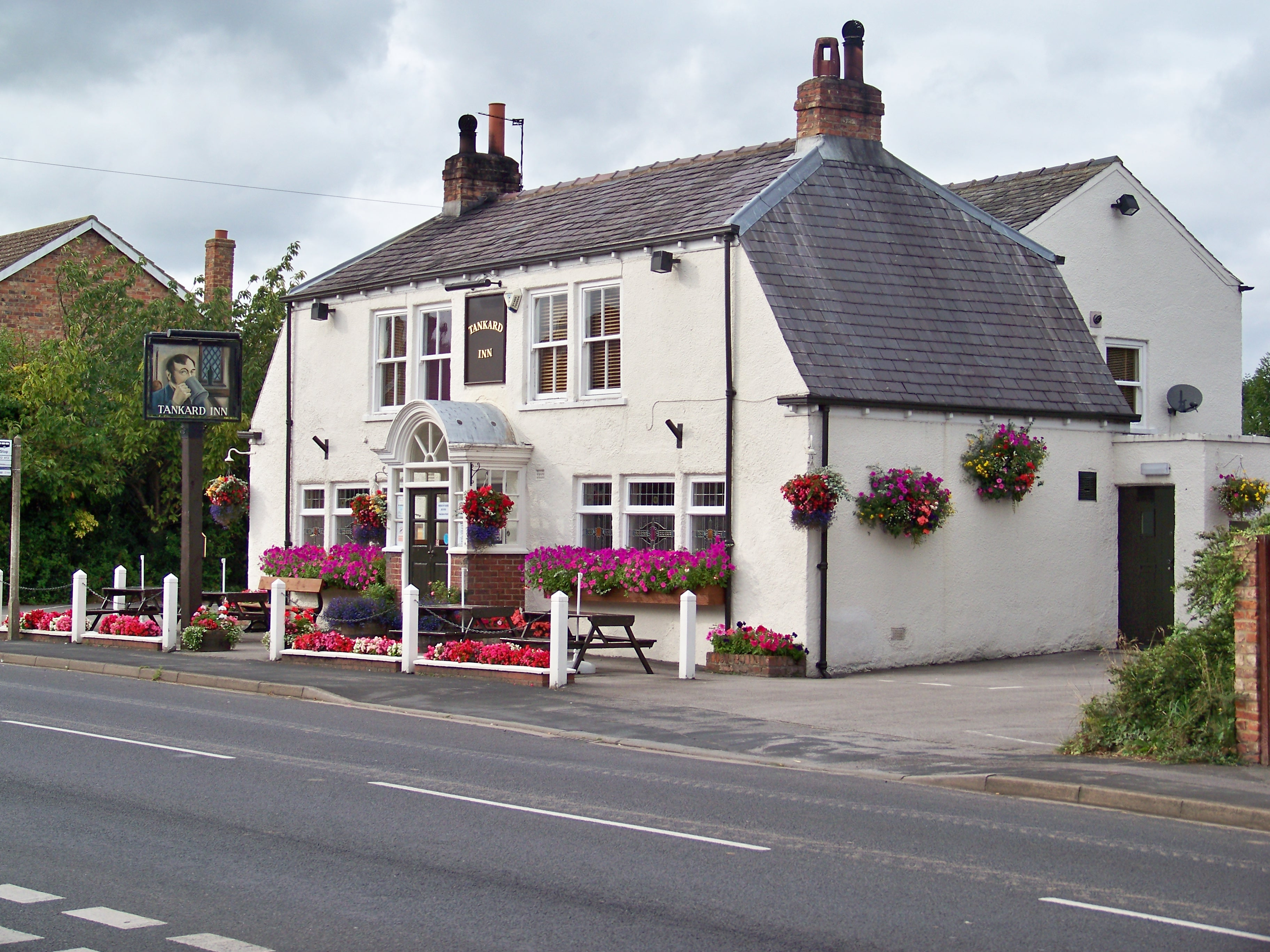
- The Tankard Inn

- Location within North Yorkshire
- Population: 560
- OS grid reference: SE530513
- Civil parish: Rufforth with Knapton
- Unitary authority: City of York
- Ceremonial county: North Yorkshire
- Region: Yorkshire and the Humber
- Country: England
- Sovereign state: United Kingdom
- Post town: YORK
- Postcode district: YO23
- Police: North Yorkshire
- Fire: North Yorkshire
- Ambulance: Yorkshire
- UK Parliament: York Outer

Rufforth is a village in the civil parish of Rufforth with Knapton, in the unitary authority area of the City of York in North Yorkshire, England. It lies about 4 miles (6.4 km) west of York. The village is mentioned in Domesday Book and dates from Saxon times.

Rufforth is the larger village in the parish of Rufforth with Knapton. The parish also includes the village of Knapton, and the Trenchard Road Estate on the edge of Acomb, York.

According to the 2001 census the parish of Rufforth with Knapton had a population of 950 of which 560 lived in Rufforth. In the 2011 census the parish of Rufforth with Knapton had a population of 1,029 of which 633 lived in Rufforth.

== Toponymy ==
The earliest record of the name is in Domesday Book of 1086. The name is from the Old English rūh "rough" and ford, and presumably refers to a ford across Moor Drain.

== History ==
The first record of a mill at Rufforth goes back to 1671. In 1868 J. Clayton, Esq. is recorded as being the lord of the manor and the chief landowner. According to the census of 1881, the population was 272.

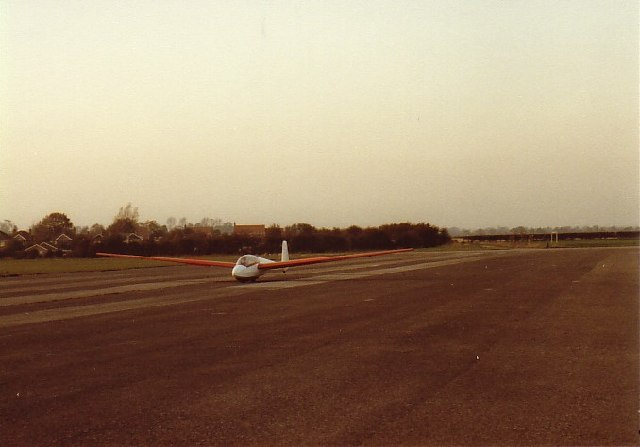
A glider on the north end of the runway at Rufforth in 1982

RAF Rufforth was a purpose-built bomber airfield built to Class A specification. It was constructed during 1941 and opened on 10 June 1942 for use by Operational Training Units and later a Heavy Conversion Unit flying Halifaxes. The site remained in RAF hands until they finally departed in 1974. In July 1981 the site was sold and is now the site of the York Gliding Centre. and a microlight flying club.

Rufforth was historically a parish in the West Riding of Yorkshire. In 1974 it was transferred to the Harrogate district in the new county of North Yorkshire. In 1988 the civil parish absorbed the civil parish of Knapton, and the merged parish was subsequently renamed Rufforth with Knapton on 4 August 2006. In 1971 the parish of Rufforth (prior to the merge) had a population of 449. In 1996 the parish was transferred to the City of York.

== Governance ==
Rufforth lies within the Rural West York ward of the City of York unitary authority. It is a part of the UK Parliamentary constituency of York Outer.

Rufforth forms part of the Rufforth with Knapton parish council area and elects five of the eight councillors.

== Economy ==
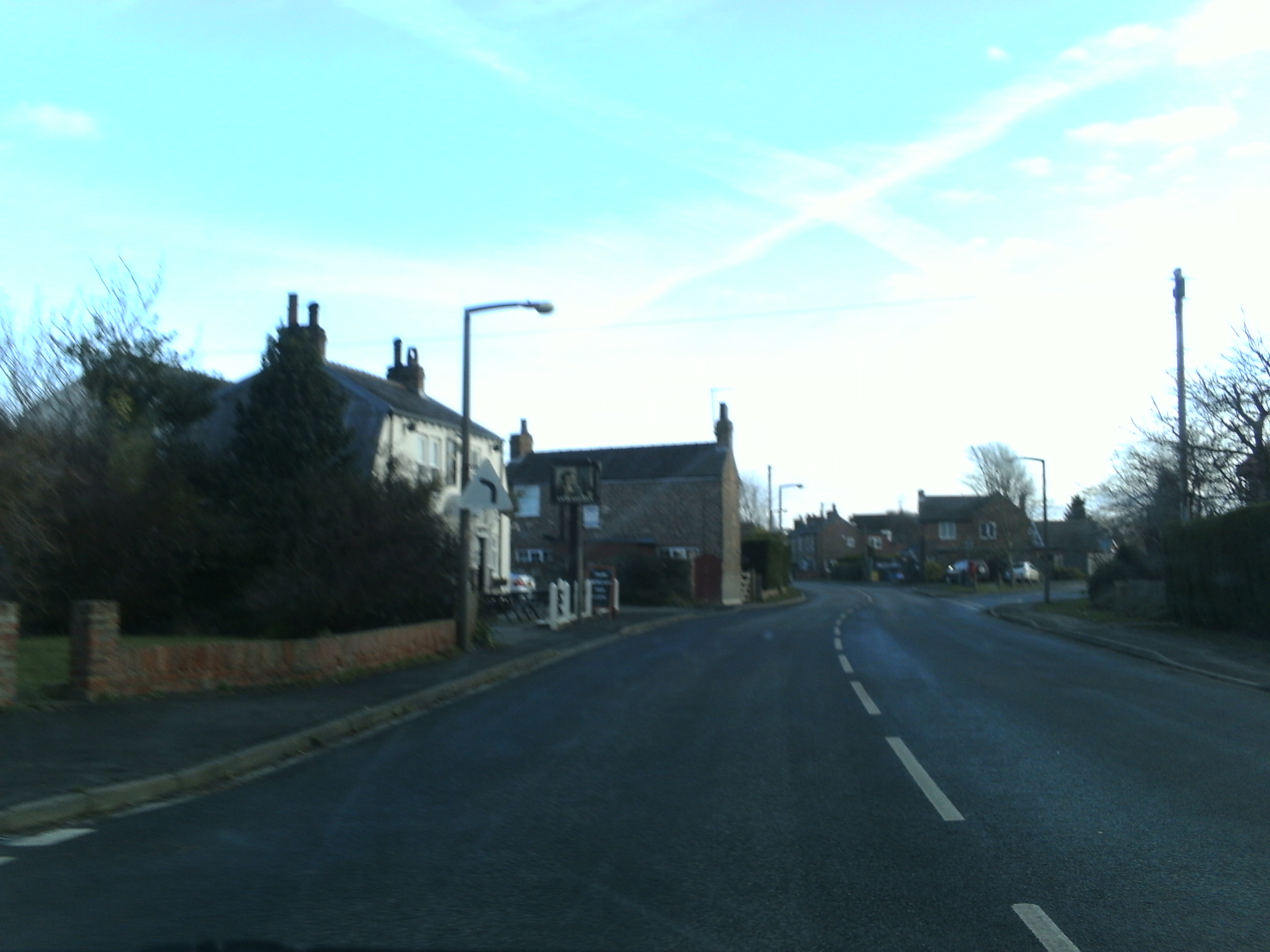
Wetherby Road looking east towards the Tankard Inn

Rufforth was a traditional farming community with seven farms during the 1970s, but because of agricultural decline there are now only two left within the village curtilage. The village is a dormitory for commuters in the nearby cities of York, Harrogate and Leeds, with only a few local jobs. The village has one public house, the Tankard Inn, a village shop and a tea room A post office now runs two mornings a week from the Methodist Chapel. The village's other pub, the Buck Inn, was converted into houses in the late 1990s.

== Transport ==
Harrogate Coach Travel buses run through the village as part of the York to Harrogate / Harrogate to York route.

== Geography ==
The soil is principally clay with a sandy ridge, on which the village was built, and a high water table. Around the end of the 19th century, most of the land was pasture with grazing cattle. Produce was mainly barley, oats and turnips. A variety of plants, especially within several wooded areas near the village, can be found. Roe deer are resident in surrounding woodland and birds of prey such as barn owl, little owl, tawny owl and buzzard are commonly seen. The surrounding landscape also provide a habitat for many lowland farmland birds including lapwing, curlew, grey partridge and skylark. There is a small village green near the village shop where the village post box is cited. There are some 50 allotments run by the parish council. Sand Dyke Nature Reserve lies to the north west of the village.

== Education ==
A non-denominational school was built in about 1870 for 60 pupils. This later became Rufforth Primary School, which in 2010 accommodated about 60–65 pupils and had an intake of 14 children each year. The primary school reached 100 pupils around 2016. Pre-school facilities are provided in the village hall.

For secondary education, the village is in the catchment area of York High School on Cornlands Road in nearby Acomb.

== Religion ==
All Saints' Church has been the parish church since the 12th century and has been rebuilt and restored several times. A Wesleyan chapel was also built in 1843 and was restored in 1884.

== Sports ==
To the south east of the village are playing fields with a pavilion. This is the home ground of Rufforth United whose 1st XI, as of 2010, play in the York Football League Division One. Rufforth Cricket Club also play their home fixtures at the Wetherby Road Arena near the airfield. The first team play in Division 2 and the second team play in Division 4 of York Senior league setup.

== Agriculture ==
Agriculture has played a major role in the development of Rufforth. The village's proximity to York made the production of fresh goods for transport into the city a viable and profitable option for local farmers.

Dairying was once a significant part of the local economy, but declining profitability led many small farms to cease production; only one dairy farm now remains within the parish. Most surrounding farmland is now used for mixed livestock, cereal and root‑crop enterprises. Beef cattle are common, with smaller numbers of sheep, and the area also supports a notable equine industry.

Cereal production includes autumn and spring‑sown barley, wheat, maize and oilseed rape. Potatoes and sugar beet are also grown, although sugar‑beet cultivation has declined sharply since the closure of the British Sugar factory in York.

== Notable landmarks and residents ==
The Lord of the Manor of Rufforth, Henry Justice was exiled for stealing books in the 1700s.

On Rufforth Airfield the old control tower still stands and was used in the TV drama series Airline during the 1980s.

A little way out of the village is Rufforth Hall built in 1860 and was used by a local York insurance company as a sports venue for its employees.

There are currently four Grade II-listed buildings/features within Rufforth. These are the pinfold, an animal pound probably from the 18th century; Pear Tree Farmhouse, built in the early 19th century; the mid-19th-century village pump and trough; and the Church of All Saints, built in 1894–95.

The British actor Mark Addy was a longtime resident of the village.

== See also ==
- Rufforth Circuit
- RAF Rufforth
