= Grapes (surname) =

Grapes is a surname. Notable people with the surname include:

- Sidney Grapes (1887–1958), English comedian
- Steve Grapes (born 1953), English footballer
