= Grapes of Wrath =

Grapes of Wrath may refer to:

== Literature ==
- A phrase in the Bible's Book of Revelation, chapter 14 verse 19: "The angel swung his sickle on the earth, gathered its grapes and threw them into the great winepress of God's wrath."
- The Grapes of Wrath, a 1901 novel by Mary Harriott Norris
- The Grapes of Wrath, a 1939 novel by John Steinbeck

== Music ==
- A phrase from the first stanza of the "Battle Hymn of the Republic" by Julia Ward Howe
- The Grapes of Wrath (band), a Canadian rock band
  - The Grapes of Wrath (album), the 1984 album by the band of the same name
- Grapes of Wrath (album), a 1983 album by British band Spear of Destiny
- Grapes of Wrath, a song by The Mission on their 1990 album Carved in Sand.
- Grapes of Wrath, a song by Weezer on their 2021 album OK Human

== Military ==
- Operation Grapes of Wrath, a 1996 Israeli military operation in South Lebanon

== Movies, TV, theatre, opera ==
- "Grapes of Wrath" (Black Books), 2000 TV episode
- The Grapes of Wrath (film), a 1940 film adaptation of the Steinbeck novel directed by John Ford
- The Grapes of Wrath (play), a 1988 play based on the Steinbeck novel
- The Grapes of Wrath (opera), an opera based on the Steinbeck novel that premiered in 2007
