= Knapton, York =

Village in North Yorkshire, England

Coordinates: 53.960°N 1.145°W

Knapton
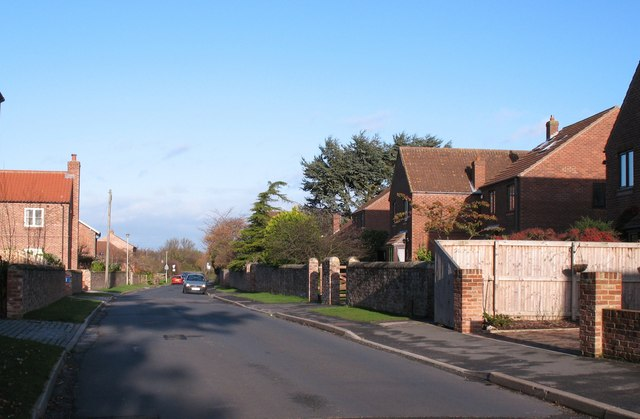
- Knapton village street, whose north end has a mix of Victorian cottages and modern detached houses

- Location within North Yorkshire
- OS grid reference: SE561520
  - London: 170 mi (270 km) S
- Civil parish: Rufforth with Knapton
- Unitary authority: City of York
- Ceremonial county: North Yorkshire
- Region: Yorkshire and the Humber
- Country: England
- Sovereign state: United Kingdom
- Post town: YORK
- Postcode district: YO23
- Dialling code: 01904
- Police: North Yorkshire
- Fire: North Yorkshire
- Ambulance: Yorkshire
- UK Parliament: York Outer

Knapton is a village in the civil parish of Rufforth with Knapton, in the City of York unitary authority area and ceremonial county of North Yorkshire, England. It is 3 miles (5 km) west of York and is bounded by the village of Acomb to the east, the B1224 to the south, the A59 to the north and the A1237 York Outer Ring Road to the west.

== History ==
There are records of a settlement here from Saxon times, but the first mention of Knapton is in the Domesday Book. In 1843 the village had a population of 113 in an area of approximately 883 acres made up mainly of farmhouses. The Lord of the manor at this time was Sir William Eden.

In the sixteenth century, the village was a detached part of the parish of Holy Trinity, Micklegate in York. Knapton was formerly a township in the parishes of Acombe and Holy Trinity Micklegate. In 1866, the legal definition of 'parish' was changed to be the areas used for administering the poor laws, and so Knapton became a civil parish. In 1974 the parish was transferred from the West Riding of Yorkshire (which included the Ainsty of York) to the Harrogate district in the new county of North Yorkshire. On 1 April 1988 the civil parish was absorbed into the civil parish of Rufforth, and the parish of Rufforth was subsequently renamed "Rufforth with Knapton" in 2006. In 1971 the parish of Knapton had a population of 203. In 1996 the parish was transferred to the City of York.

== Governance ==
Knapton is part of the Rural West York Ward of the Unitary Authority of the City of York. It is part of the UK Parliamentary Constituency of York Outer.

It is part of the Parish Council of Rufforth and Knapton. Before 1996, the village was administered by North Yorkshire County Council and Harrogate Borough Council.

== Community ==
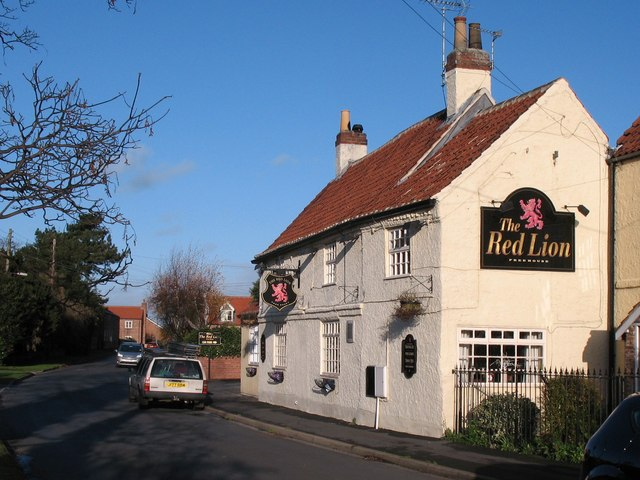
The Red Lion public house

The current population is estimated to be 222 in approximately 96 households.

The only permanent amenity in the village is the Red Lion Public House. Local shopping, sports and religious services are served in nearby Acomb. Children of primary school age attend Poppleton Ousebank County Primary School in Upper Poppleton. The Eddie Brown/Harrogate Connexions Bus route 412 from Wetherby to York calls in the village. This service is every two hours in each direction and does not operate on Sundays.
