= Rufforth Circuit =

Motor racing circuit in North Yorkshire, England

Coordinates: 53.9492°N 1.1848°W

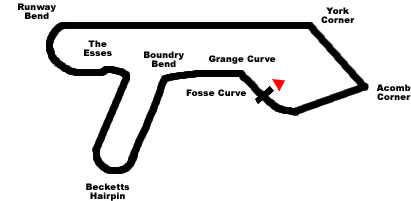
- Rufforth 1960-1978 Track Layout
- Location: North Yorkshire, England
- Opened: 1959
- Closed: 1978
- Major events: Formula 2, Formula Junior

1959 Circuit
- Length: 3.4 km (2.1 mi)

1960-1978 Circuit
- Length: 2.7 km (1.7 mi)

Rufforth Circuit is a disused motor racing circuit built on an airfield in North Yorkshire, England. Rufforth circuit was built on the site of a World War II bomber base, RAF Rufforth, opened in 1942. The airfield remained in active service after the war, eventually closing in 1954. Rufforth circuit opened in 1959, and held races until 1962. The circuit hosted Formula 2 and Formula Junior races between 1961 and 1978 as well as numerous sports car events. The circuit was one of many of Britain's airfields to be transformed into motor racing venues.

== History ==
Rufforth circuit layout 1959

The original track layout of Rufforth circuit was used in 1959. This layout was 3.4 km (2.1 mi) long with the start/finish straight 2/3 of the way down the main straight.

The layout of Rufforth circuit was changed for 1960. The track was shortened to 2.7 km (1.7 mi) with the start finish straight being shortened and The Esses being inserted between Becketts Hairpin and Runway Bend. The start/finish straight was moved from the main straight to between Fosse Curve and Grange Curve.

== Results ==
Year	Date	Class	Event	Winning driver	Winning constructor	Report
1960	10 September	Formula 2	X B.R.S.C.C. Formula 2 Race	(Netherlands) Klaas Twisk	Cooper-Climax	Report
1961	1 April	Formula Junior	John Davy Championship Round 3	(United Kingdom) Peter Procter	Lotus-Ford	Report
1961	20 May	Formula Junior	John Davy Championship Round 9	(United Kingdom) Derek Bishton	Elva-BMC	Report
1961	9 September	Formula Junior	John Davy Championship Round 15	(United Kingdom) Peter Procter	Alexis-Ford	Report
1962	21 April	Formula Junior	B.R.S.C.C. Junior Championship Round 3	(United Kingdom) Geoff Breakell	Lotus-Ford	Report
1962	8 September	Formula Junior	B.R.S.C.C. Junior Championship Round 17	(United Kingdom) Bill Bradley	Cooper-Ford	Report
