= Saxton with Scarthingwell =

Civil parish in North Yorkshire, England

Coordinates: 53.829°N 1.270°W

- Civil parish
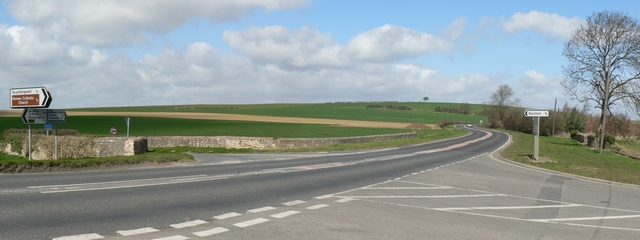
- Crossroads near Scarthingwell

- Location within North Yorkshire
- Area: 5.9 sq mi (15 km^{2}) (2011 Census)
- Population: 592 (2011 Census)
  - Density: 100/sq mi (39/km^{2})
- OS grid reference: SE491371
- Unitary authority: North Yorkshire
- Ceremonial county: North Yorkshire
- Region: Yorkshire and the Humber
- Country: England
- Sovereign state: United Kingdom
- Post town: TADCASTER
- Postcode district: LS24
- Dialling code: 01937
- Police: North Yorkshire
- Fire: North Yorkshire
- Ambulance: Yorkshire
- UK Parliament: Wetherby and Easingwold

Saxton with Scarthingwell is a civil parish just south of Tadcaster in North Yorkshire, England. The parish contains the villages of Saxton and Scarthingwell, with two churches and the remains of a castle. Historically the area was a township, however it has been its own civil parish since 1866. Although the main part of the Battle of Towton was fought to the north out of the parish, some of the dead were interred in the parish, and at least one minor skirmish was fought within the parish boundaries.

The parish shares a grouped parish council with Lead.

== History ==
Saxton is mentioned in the Domesday Book as having a church, meadow and ploughlands, but Scarthingwell is not recorded as a name until 1202. Land in the parish was granted to Margaret Kirkton by Alice de Lacy in the late 13th century.

The parish of Saxton historically included Cockbridge, Scarthingwell, Towton and detached parts of Barkston Ash. The detached parts of Barkston Ash were transferred to Sherburn in Elmet parish in 1888. Towton became a separate civil parish.

The Church of St Mary in Lead was founded in 1292 by Roger de Saxton. The church, now known as a chapel, still exists, and though at times Lead was within the parish of Saxton with Scarthingwell (having been transferred from Ryther), it is now in its own civil parish.

The churchyard at Saxton contains at least one burial from the Battle of Towton who was interred after the battle – Randolph Dacre, who had been MP for Cumberland in 1442. Dacre fought on the side of the Lancastrians. Other bodies were interred at Saxton in 1745 (nearly 300 years later) when they were uncovered at the Towton battlefield site. Before the Battle of Towton, the Yorkist side advanced towards Towton Dale from the south, moving through the Saxton parish. In 2018, the boundaries of the battlefield were extended to also take in land within the Saxton parish. The site is recognised by Historic England as being of national importance.

The parish is the site of the smaller conflict of the Battle of Dintingdale, a minor fight on the same day as the Battle of Towton. Lord Clifford, fighting for the Lancastrian side, was killed at Dintingdale. The Battles of Ferrybridge, Dintingdale and Towton, were all held on the same day, but because of the casualties at Towton, it eclipses the other two. Historically, Towton was within the parish boundaries, and Saxton and Scarthingwell were a township in the parish.

The A162 road cuts through the parish on a north/south axis and connects the parish with Tadcaster in the north 4 miles (6.4 km), and Sherburn-in-Elmet to the south. Three bus routes totalling eight services per day connect the parish with Tadcaster and Sherburn. The nearest railway station is Church Fenton, some 3 miles (5 km) to the east.

Although now delisted from the main works, a section of the proposed HS2 railway line to York was projected to run through the far south-eastern corner of the parish.

=== Saxton Castle ===
The village holds the site of Saxton Castle, an 11th-century motte and bailey design, which has been damaged by being built upon since its demise.

=== Scarthingwell Hall ===
The hall was built in the 18th century for the Hawke family, with landscaping following in the same century. In 1854, a private chapel was built by the lake, which became the Church of the Immaculate Conception St John the Worker, a grade II listed building. Scarthingwell Hall was demolished in 1960, and a care home was built upon the site in 2022.

== Governance ==
Historically, the parish was in the wapentake of Barkston Ash, in the West Riding of Yorkshire. Since 1974, the parish has been in North Yorkshire. From 1974 to 2023 it was part of the Borough of Harrogate, it is now administered by the unitary North Yorkshire Council. The ancient parish of Saxton included the village of Towton and the land within what is now the civil parish of Lead. Saxton and Scarthingwell were classified as a township within the parish. Since 1866, it has been established as its own civil parish. In 1964, the parish covered an area of 1,101 hectares (4.3 sq mi), which by the 2011 Census was 1,527 hectares (5.9 sq mi). The area is represented at Parliament as part of the Wetherby and Easingwold.

== Population ==
Population of Saxton with Scarthingwell 1801–2019
| 1801 | 1811 | 1821 | 1831 | 1841 | 1851 | 1861 | 1871 | 1881 | 1891 | 1901 | 1911 | 1921 | 1931 | 1951 | 1961 | 1971 | 2001 | 2011 | 2015 | 2019 |
|---|---|---|---|---|---|---|---|---|---|---|---|---|---|---|---|---|---|---|---|---|
| 362 | 318 | 378 | 407 | 427 | 371 | 360 | 359 | 322 | 316 | 300 | 292 | 312 | 267 | 299 | 294 | 381 | 514‡ | 592 | 550‡ | 615‡ |

‡ Estimated.

== Notable residents ==
- William Crowe, poet and vicar, was incumbent at Saxton in the early 19th century.
- Edward Hawke, naval officer resided at Scarthingwell Hall
- The Hungate baronets, a baronetcy from Saxton.

== See also ==
- Listed buildings in Saxton with Scarthingwell
