= Old Hungate Hospital =

Building in Sherburn-in-Elmet, North Yorkshire, England

Coordinates: 53°47′52″N 1°15′08″W

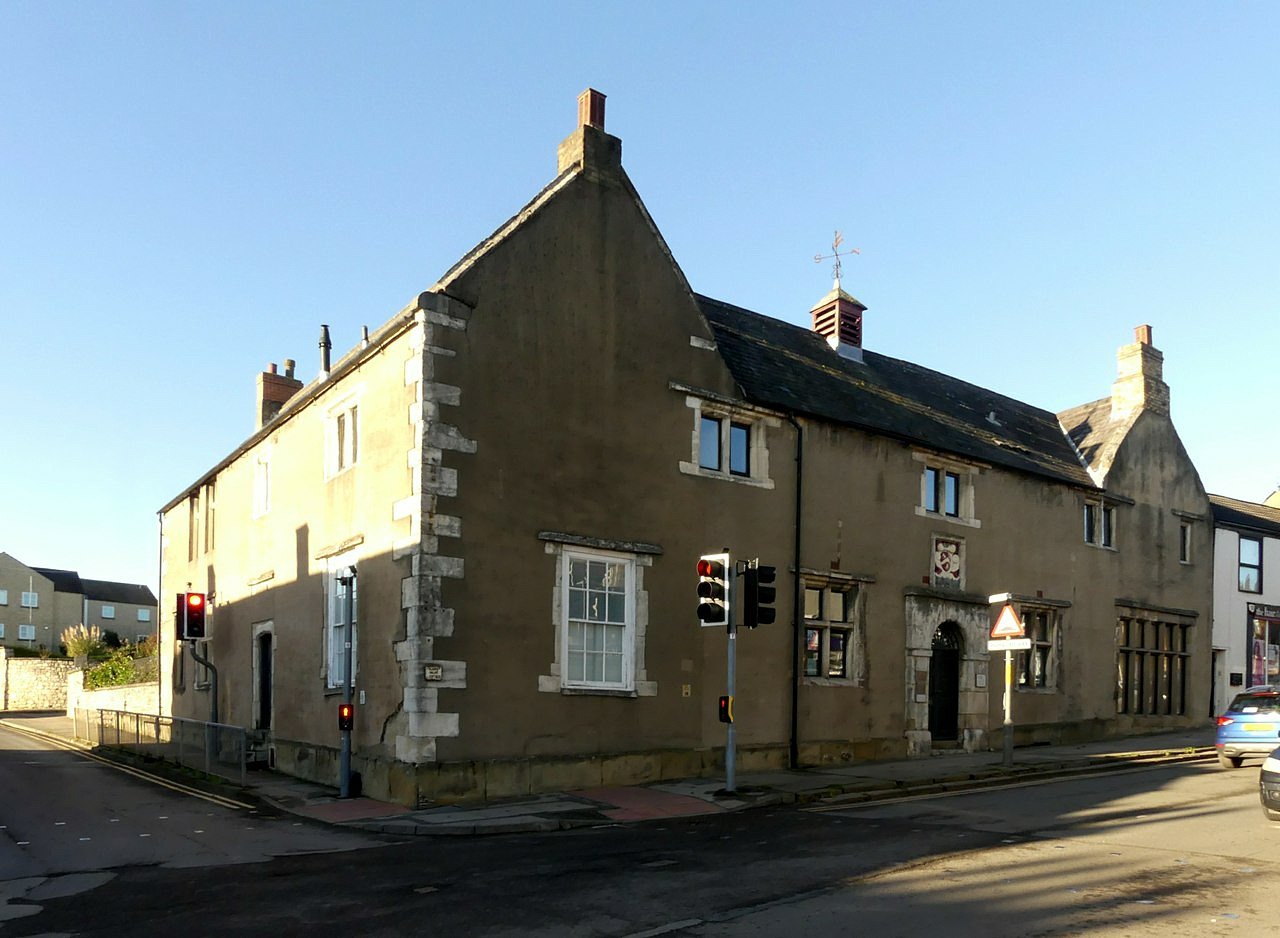
The building, in 2024

Old Hungate Hospital is a historic building in Sherburn-in-Elmet, a town in North Yorkshire, in England.

The building was constructed in 1619, as a hospital and school for 24 orphans, of whom, four would be funded to attend St John's College, Cambridge. It was founded and a charity endowed by Robert Hungate in his will. Over time, the income of the charity fell. By the late 19th century, it was accommodating only six orphans and was no longer funding attendance at Cambridge. At some point in the 20th century, it was converted into a village hall, then in 1997 it was converted into a health centre. It was refurbished in 2024. It has been grade II listed since 1986.

The building is constructed of magnesian limestone, mainly rendered, on a plinth, with quoins, and it has a Welsh slate roof and gables with moulded coping. There are two storeys, a U-shaped plan, and a front range of four bays. In the centre is a round-arched entrance with a wide surround on a moulded base, above which is a cartouche with a coat of arms. Most of the windows are mullioned or mullioned and transomed, and there is a single-light window and a sash window, all with hood moulds. On the left return is a doorway with a Tudor arch and chamfered jambs.

== See also ==
- Listed buildings in Sherburn in Elmet
