= All Saints' Church, Ryther =

Church in Ryther cum Ossendyke, North Yorkshire, England

Coordinates: 53.8480°N 1.1579°W

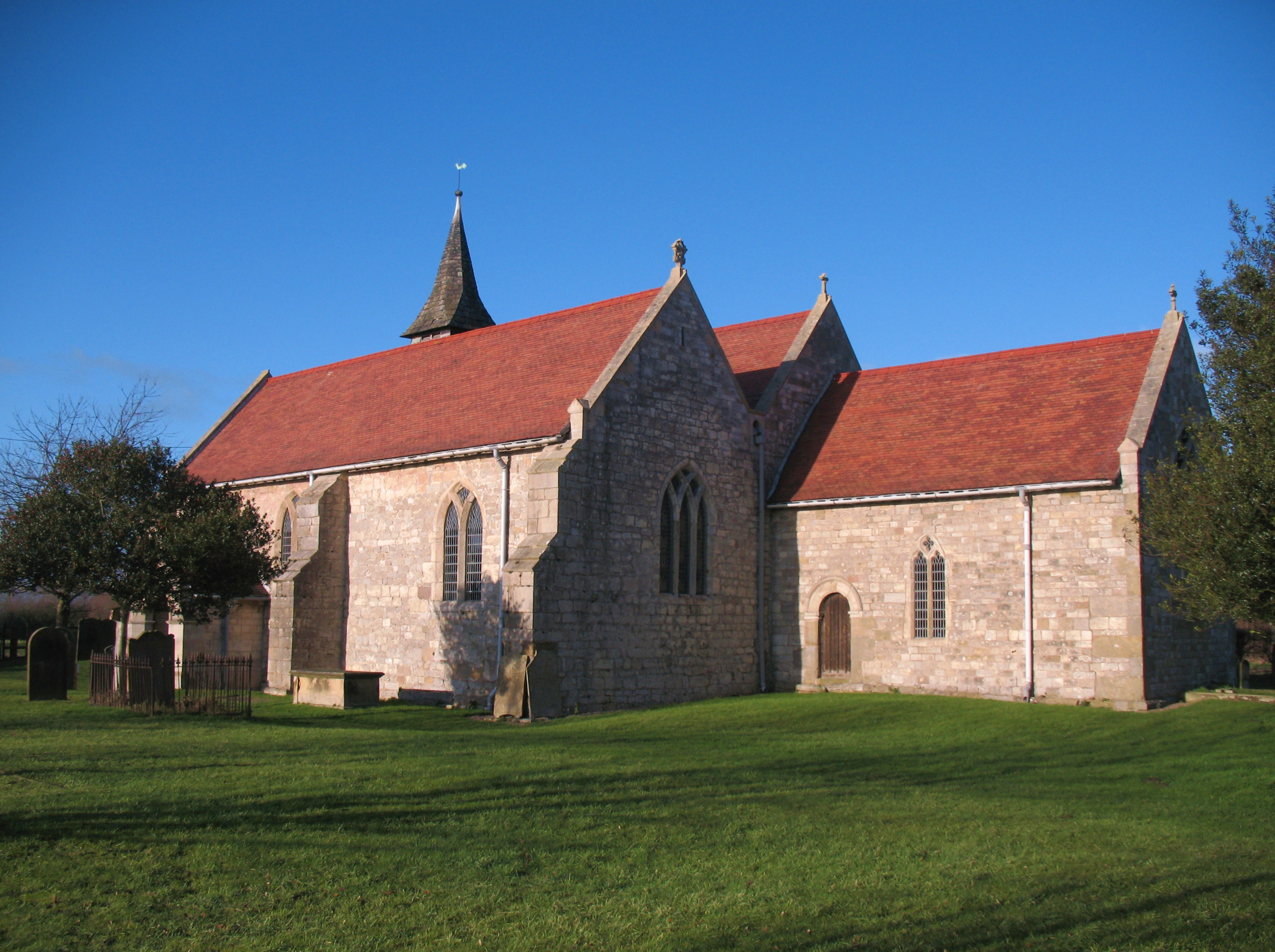
The church, seen from the south-east, in 2012

All Saints' Church is the parish church of Ryther cum Ossendyke, a village north-west of Selby in Yorkshire, in England.

The church was originally built around the time of the Norman Conquest, and it was recorded in the Domesday Book. It has sometimes been described as Saxon, although little material survives from this date - principally, some carved stones set into the wall, and two reset window heads, and possibly the round chancel arch. The nave was rebuilt in the 13th century, and the chancel in the 14th century, when a south aisle was also added to the church. In 1773, the church was restored and partly rebuilt, and the chancel was again rebuilt in 1843. In 1898, C. Hodgson Fowler undertook a major restoration, in which the brick tower was taken down and replaced by a bell turret, the roof was replaced, and a new east window was added, along with a south porch.

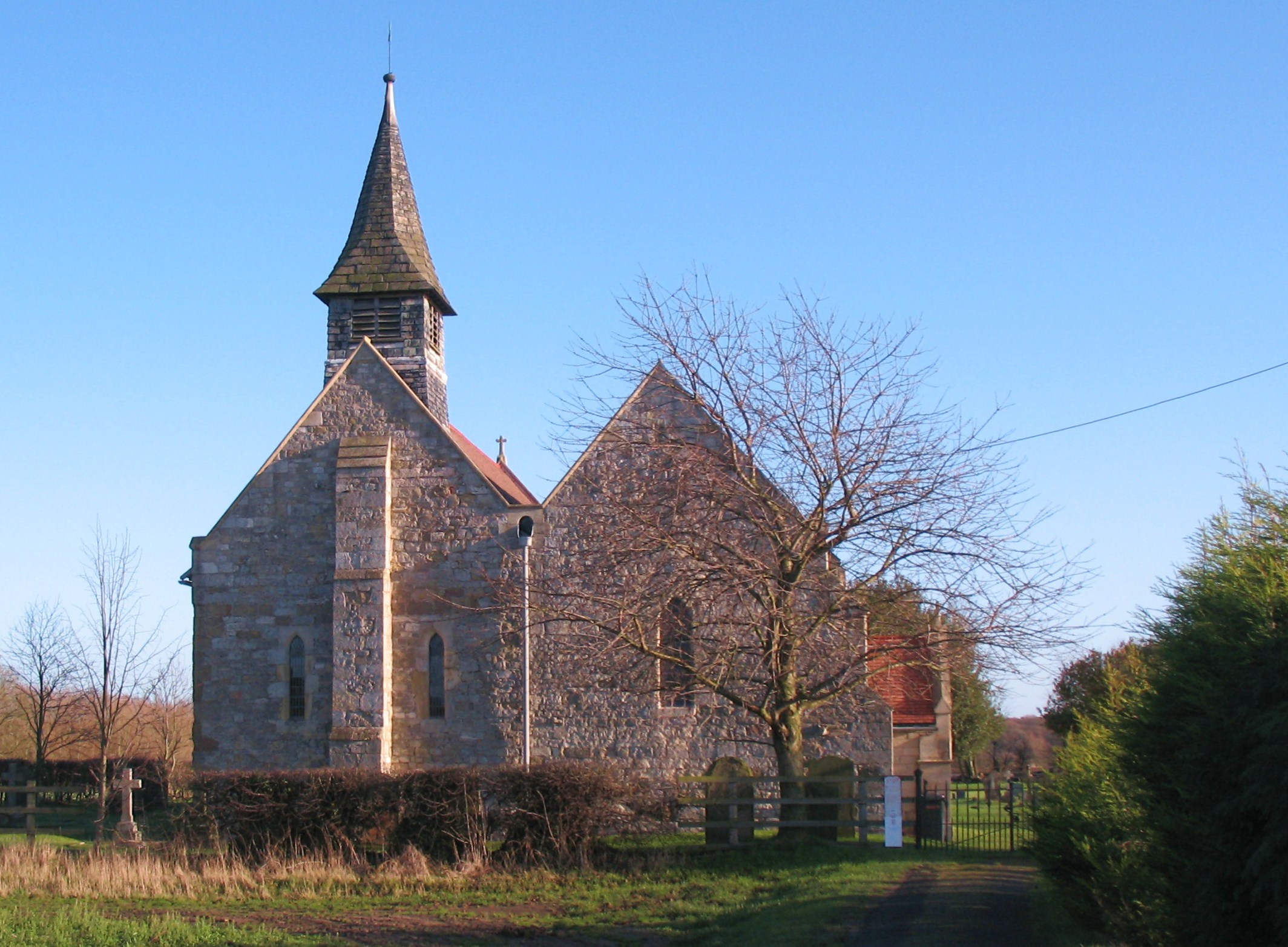
West end of the church, in 2012

The church is built of a mixture of limestone and gritstone, with a tiled roof. It has a simple plan with a three-bay nave and a two-bay chancel. Inside, there is an early font, 15th century piscina and a hagioscope. There are five stone altars, possibly dating from the 11th century, with worn carvings representing the wounds of Christ.

The parish has been reduced in size on several occasions; St Mary's Chapel, Lead was formerly a chapel-of-ease. In 1967, the church was Grade I listed.
