= Listed buildings in Saxton with Scarthingwell =

Saxton with Scarthingwell is a civil parish in the county of North Yorkshire, England. It contains 15 listed buildings that are recorded in the National Heritage List for England. Of these, one is listed at Grade I, the highest of the three grades, and the others are at Grade II, the lowest grade. The parish contains the villages of Saxton and Scarthingwell, and the surrounding countryside. Most of the listed buildings are farmhouses and farm buildings, some converted for residential use, two churches, a cross shaft and a tomb in a churchyard, a cross base by a road junction, two mileposts and a telephone kiosk.

== Key ==
Grade	Criteria
I	Buildings of exceptional interest, sometimes considered to be internationally important
II	Buildings of national importance and special interest

== Buildings ==
Name and location	Photograph	Date	Notes	Grade
All Saints' Church, Saxton; 53.82609°N 1.27874°W		11th century	The church has been altered and enlarged though the centuries. It consists of a nave with a chapel to the south, a chancel with a north vestry, and a west tower. The tower has two stages, a chamfered plinth, a narrow round-arched south door, a three-light west window with a hood mould, a clock face, two-light bell openings with hood moulds, a corbel table, and an embattled parapet with corner pinnacles. The south doorway is Norman, and has a round arch, and shafts with waterleaf capitals. At the east end are three stepped lancet windows.	I
Cross shaft 53.82605°N 1.27828°W	—	Medieval	The cross shaft is in the churchyard of All Saints' Church, Saxton, to the east of the church. It is in magnesian limestone, and consists of a slander shaft with chamfered sides, about 1.25 metres (4 ft 1 in) in height.	II
Village Cross; 53.82025°N 1.25871°W		Medieval	The cross base, at the junction of Headwell Lane and the A162 road, is in limestone. It consists of a square block with chamfered corners, and a central hole for the former shaft.	II
Lord Dacre's Tomb; 53.82622°N 1.27859°W		c. 1461	The tomb of Ralph, Lord Dacre, is in the churchyard of All Saints' Church, Saxton, to the north of the church. It is in limestone, and has an oblong plan, measuring about 1.75 metres (5 ft 9 in) by 1 metre (3 ft 3 in) and is about 1 metre (3 ft 3 in) in height. It is plain, and has weathered coats of arms on the sides and ends.	II
Barn, Scarthingwell Hall Farm; 53.82828°N 1.25310°W		Early 18th century	The barn on the model farm is in stone and has a roof of pantile and corrugated sheeting, and eleven bays. On the front is a projecting three-bay hay store containing three round-arched openings with keystones and impost blocks under a wide pediment. Flanking this are double doors under segmental arches, and single-storey lean-tos with a circular window above.	II
East range, Scarthingwell Hall Farm; 53.82826°N 1.25270°W		Early 18th century	A farm building in the model farm converted into a house, it is in stone with quoins, a floor band and a pantile roof, hipped at the south end. There are two storeys and nine bays, the middle three bays of the west front projecting under a pediment containing a circular window. The ground floor contains three round-arched openings with keystones and impost blocks, and above is a semicircular pitching hole converted into a window, and two casement windows. The outer bays contain round-arched doorways and windows, all with keystones, and above are semicircular pitching holes.	II
West range, Scarthingwell Hall Farm; 53.82815°N 1.25345°W		Early 18th century	A farm building in the model farm converted into a house, it is in stone with quoins, a floor band and a pantile roof, hipped at the south end. There are two storeys and nine bays, the middle three bays of the west front projecting under a pediment containing a circular window. The ground floor contains three round-arched openings with keystones and impost blocks, and above is a semicircular pitching hole converted into a window, and two casement windows. The outer bays contain round-arched doorways and windows, all with keystones, and above are semicircular pitching holes.	II
Village Farm; 53.82525°N 1.27839°W		Early to mid-18th century (probable)	The farmhouse is in magnesian limestone, and has a pantile roof with stone coping and kneelers. There are two storeys and three bays. The doorway is in the right bay, and the windows are sashes with flat arches.	II
White Rose Farm; 53.82635°N 1.27912°W		Late 18th to early 19th century	The farmhouse is in magnesian limestone with a tile roof. There are three storeys and three bays. The doorway and the windows, which are multi-paned casements, have cambered heads.	II
School Farm; 53.82634°N 1.27935°W		Early 19th century	The farmhouse is in magnesian limestone with a Welsh slate roof. There are three storeys and three bays. The central doorway has a fanlight, and the windows are sashes, those in the ground floor horizontally sliding. All the openings have cambered heads.	II
Pigeoncote, School Farm; 53.82647°N 1.27929°W	—	Early 19th century	The pigeoncote is in magnesian limestone with a hipped asbestos roof. There are three storeys and one bay. On the ground floor is a doorway, the middle floor contains a loading door, and on the top floor are pigeon openings and a landing shelf.	II
Church of the Immaculate Conception, Scarthingwell; 53.82580°N 1.25380°W		1854	Originally a private chapel, later a church, it is in Neo-Norman style, and built in limestone, with slate roofs and stone coped gables. It consists of a nave, a chancel with an apse, a south vestry and a south porch. The church has a moulded plinth, a moulded sill band, and a Lombard frieze at the eaves. On the west gable is a small turret, and in the west gable wall are three small niches. The windows on the apse are lancets, and on the nave are two-light windows with quatrefoils.	II
Milestone south of junction with Scarthingwell Lane; 53.82391°N 1.25950°W		Late 19th century	The milepost on the east side of the A162 road is in stone and had a cast iron plate. It had a triangular plan and a rounded top, and was about 1 metre (3 ft 3 in) in height. On the top was inscribed "TADCASTER & DONCASTER ROAD" and "SAXTON CUM SCARTHINGWELL". On the left side were the distances to Doncaster, Pontefract and Ferrybridge, and on the right side to York and Tadcaster.	II
Milestone north of junction with Scarthingwell Lane; 53.83815°N 1.26434°W		Late 19th century	The milepost on the east side of the A162 road is in stone with a cast iron plate. It has a triangular plan and a rounded top, and is about 1 metre (3 ft 3 in) in height. On the top is inscribed "TADCASTER & DONCASTER ROAD" and "SAXTON CUM SCARTHINGWELL". On the left side are the distances to Doncaster, Pontefract and Ferrybridge, and on the right side to York and Tadcaster.	II
Telephone kiosk 53.82651°N 1.27818°W		1935	The K6 type telephone kiosk at the junction of Main Street and Cotchers Lane, Saxton, was designed by Giles Gilbert Scott. Constructed in cast iron with a square plan and a dome, it has three unperforated crowns in the top panels.	II
