= Holy Trinity Church, Barkston Ash =

Church in Barkston Ash, North Yorkshire, England

Coordinates: 53°49′08″N 1°15′18″W

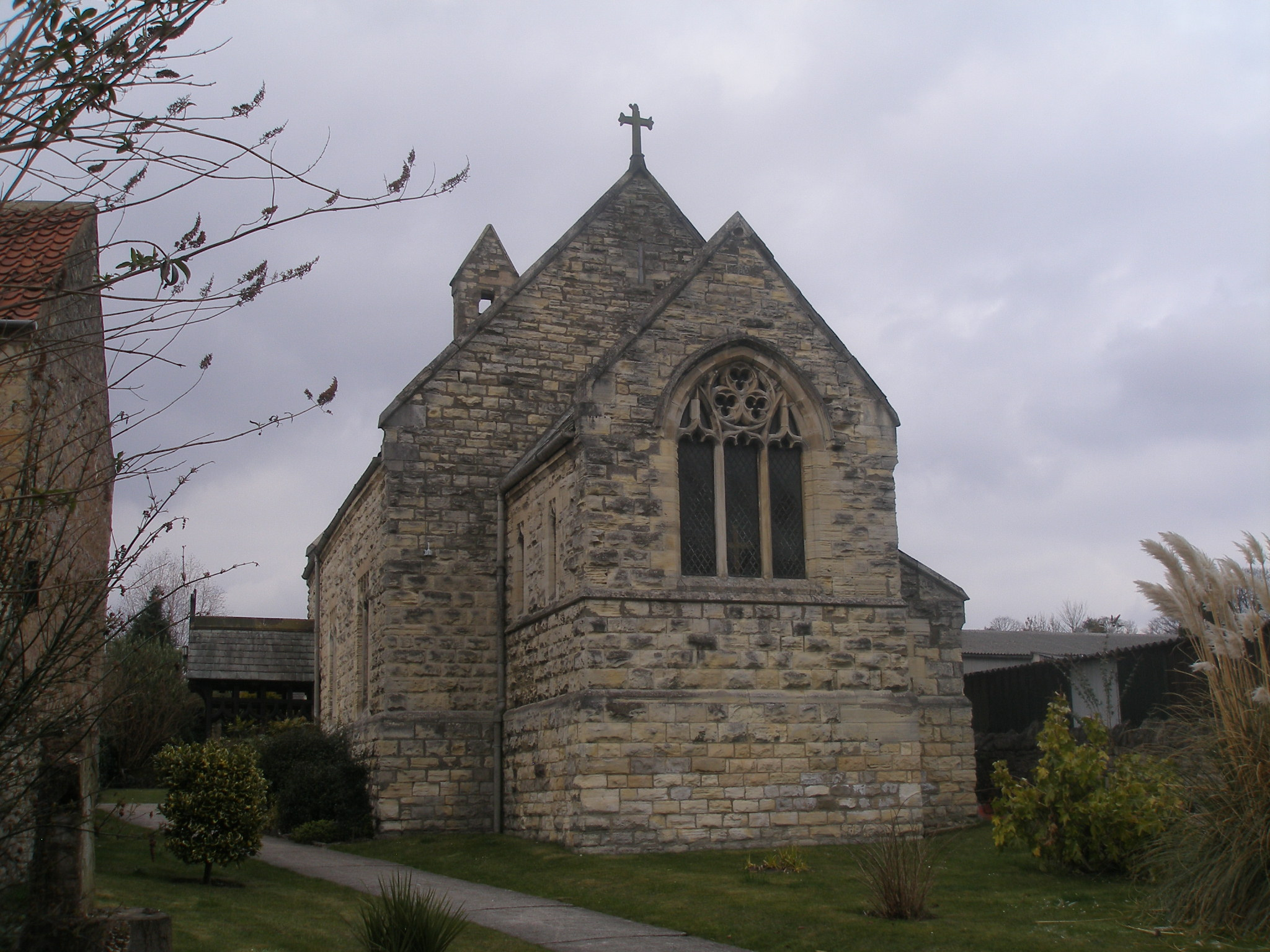
The church, in 2013

Holy Trinity Church is an Anglican church in Barkston Ash, a village in North Yorkshire, in England.

Until the mid 19th century, the village did not have a place of worship, but instead fell into the parish of All Saints' Church, Sherburn in Elmet. In 1869, the vicar of Sherburn was licensed to officiate in a house in the village, but he was unable to administer the sacraments there, and so a dedicated chapel-of-ease was constructed, to a design by William Bakewell. The foundation stone was laid on 13 October 1873, with more land acquired the following year. The building was completed in about 1880. A pipe organ was installed in 1907, and electricity came to the church in 1939.

In 1974, the chapel was consecrated as a church, dedicated to the Holy Trinity, although it remained in the parish of Sherburn.
