= Lead, North Yorkshire =

Coordinates: 53°50′N 1°18′W

Lead
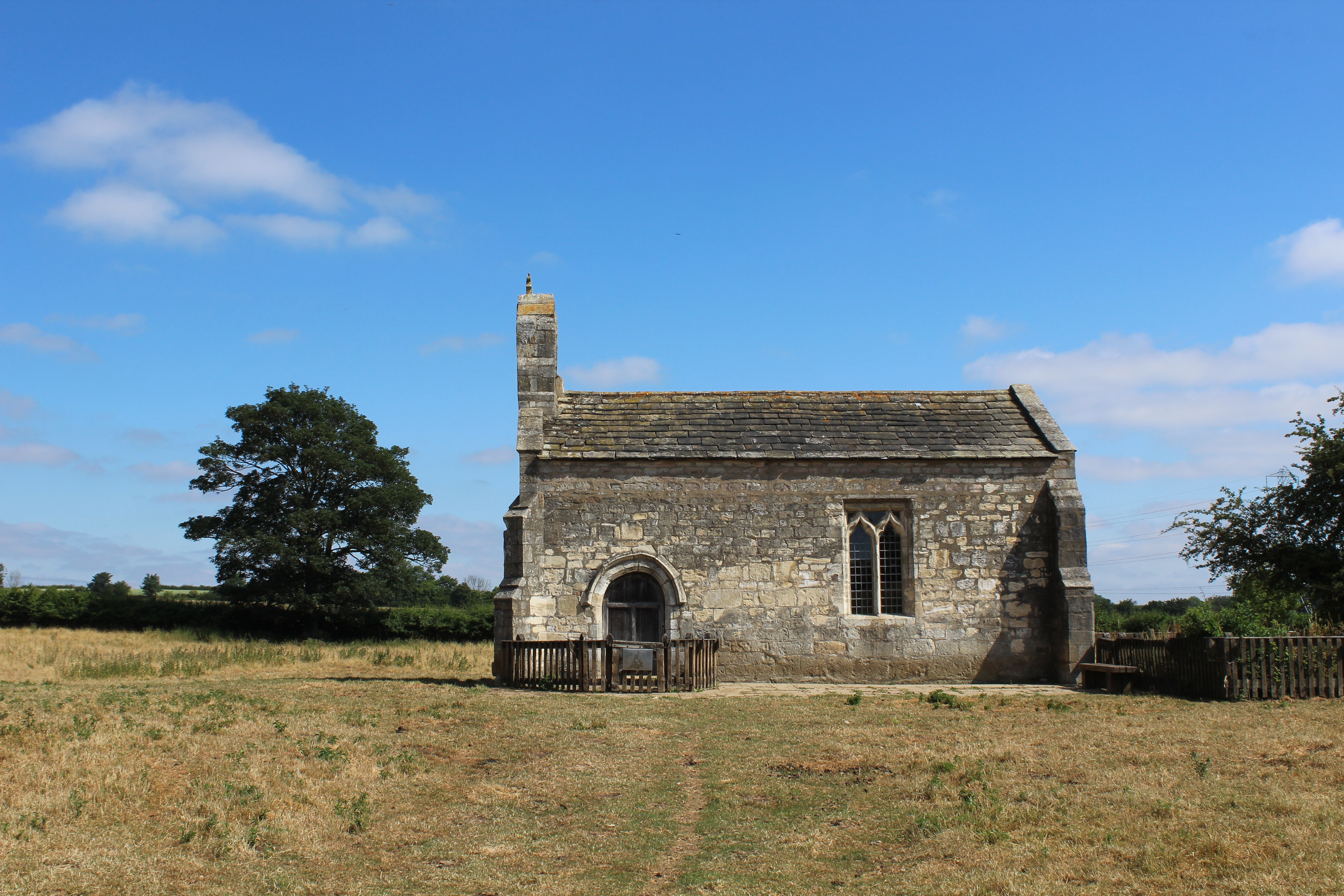
- St Mary's Church

- Location within North Yorkshire
- Population: 40
- Civil parish: Lead
- Unitary authority: North Yorkshire
- Ceremonial county: North Yorkshire
- Region: Yorkshire and the Humber
- Country: England
- Sovereign state: United Kingdom
- Police: North Yorkshire
- Fire: North Yorkshire
- Ambulance: Yorkshire

Lead is a civil parish in North Yorkshire, England. It is located 4 miles (6 km) south west of Tadcaster.

The parish consists of several scattered farms. There is no village in the parish. No public roads enter the parish, although the B1217 road runs just outside the parish. Access is by private roads or by public footpaths. The population was estimated at only 40 in 2015. The parish shares a grouped parish council with Saxton with Scarthingwell.

== History ==
Lead was mentioned, in the form Lied, in the Domesday Book of 1086. The place-name may be derived from the Old English lǣd, meaning "water channel", referring to the stream now called Cock Beck which borders the parish.

In 1461 the Battle of Towton took place near here. The eastern part of the parish, along Cock Beck, has been included in the registered battlefield site.

Lead was historically a township in the parish of Ryther, in the wapentake of Barkston Ash in the West Riding of Yorkshire. It became a separate civil parish in the 19th century. In 1974 it was transferred to the new county of North Yorkshire.

== St Mary's Church ==
St Mary's Church is a redundant Anglican chapel standing in an isolated position in the south of the parish. It dates from the 14th century and is a Grade II* listed building.
