= Barkston Ash Wapentake =

Coordinates: 53.818°N 1.254°W

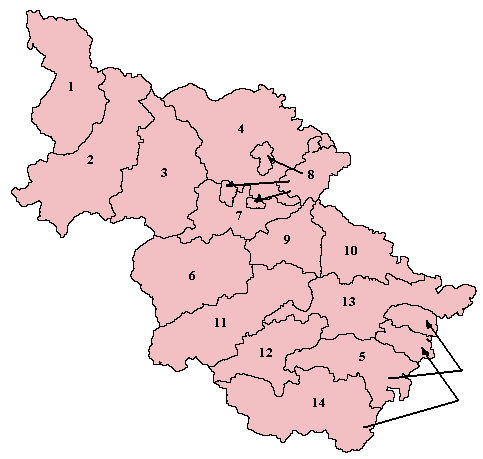
Wapentakes of the West Riding. Barkston Ash is labelled 10 on the map.

Barkston Ash was a wapentake of the West Riding of Yorkshire, named after the meeting-place at the village of Barkston. It included the parishes of Birkin, Bramham cum Oglethorpe, Brayton, Drax, Kirk Fenton, Ledsham, Monk Fryston, Newton Kyme cum Toulston, Saxton with Scarthingwell and Sherburn-in-Elmet and parts of Brotherton, Kirkby Wharfe, Ryther, Snaith and Tadcaster.
