= All Saints' Church, Saxton =

Church in North Yorkshire, England

Coordinates: 53.826°N 1.278°W

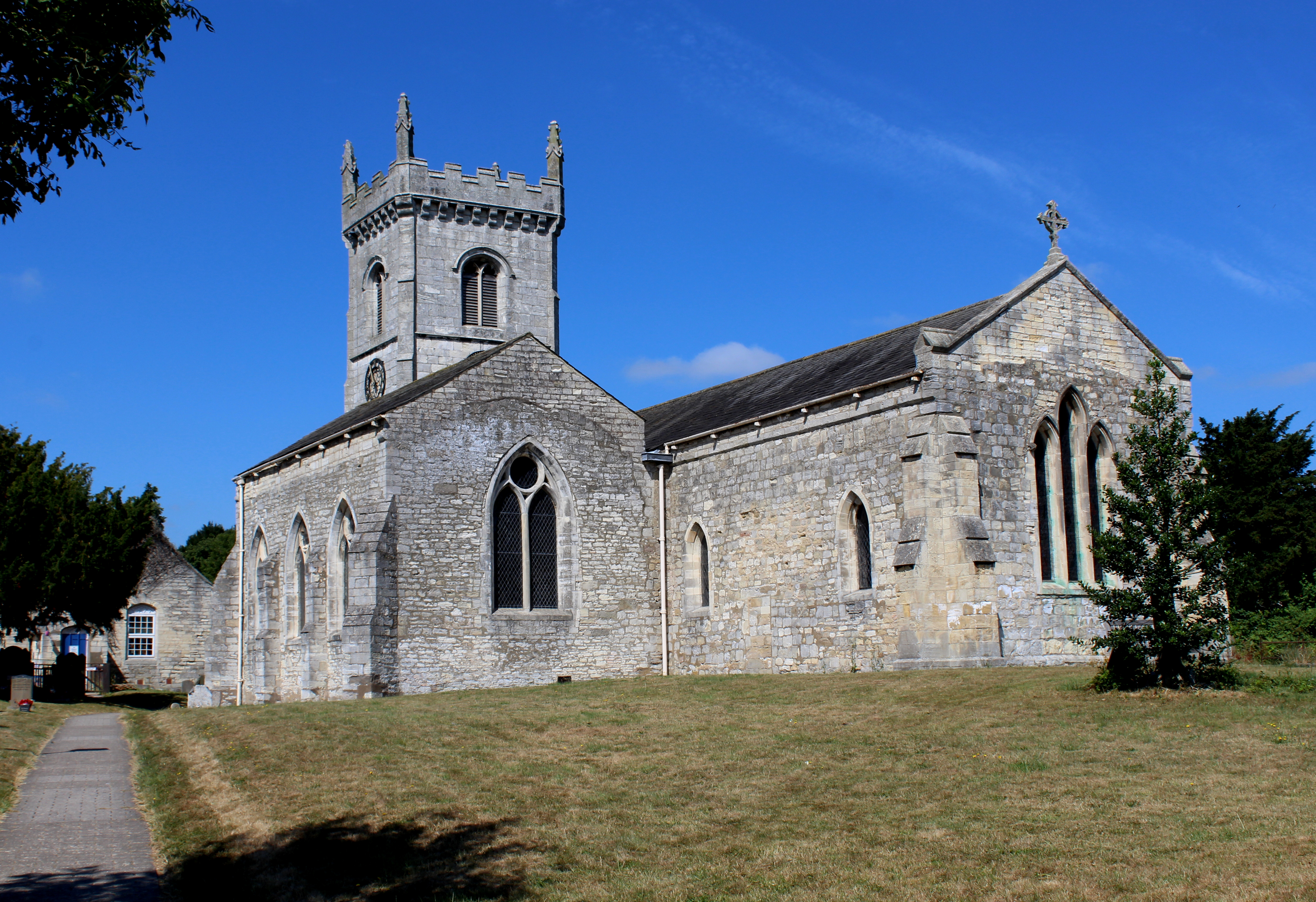
The church, in 2018

All Saints' Church is the parish church of Saxton, North Yorkshire, a village in England.

The church was built in the 11th century, initially serving as a chapel of ease in the parish of All Saints' Church, Sherburn in Elmet. The nave and chancel survive from this period. A south chapel was added in the 14th century, followed by a tower in the early 15th century. The church was restored in 1867, the work including the addition of a vestry, and was again restored in 1907. It was grade I listed in 1967.

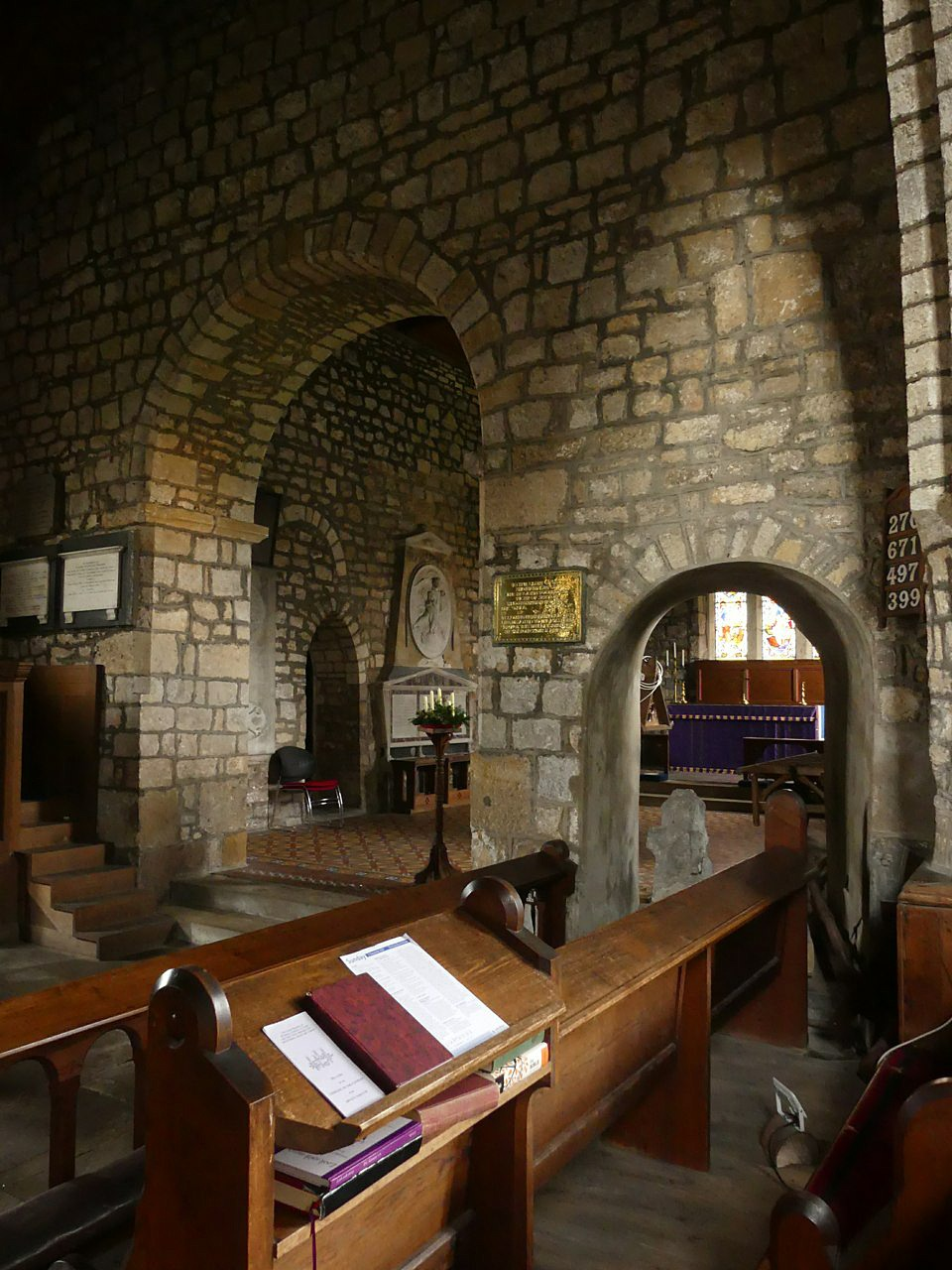
View from the nave into the chancel

The church consists of a nave with a chapel to the south, a chancel with a north vestry, and a west tower. The tower has two stages, a chamfered plinth, a narrow round-arched south door, a three-light west window with a hood mould, a clock face, two-light bell openings with hood moulds, a corbel table, and an embattled parapet with corner pinnacles. The south doorway is Norman, and has a round arch, and shafts with waterleaf capitals. At the east end are three stepped lancet windows. Inside, there is a Mediaeval octagonal stone font on a 19th-century base, an aumbry dating from about 1180, four 17th-century tombstones, three of which are set into the wall, and two late-18th century memorials.

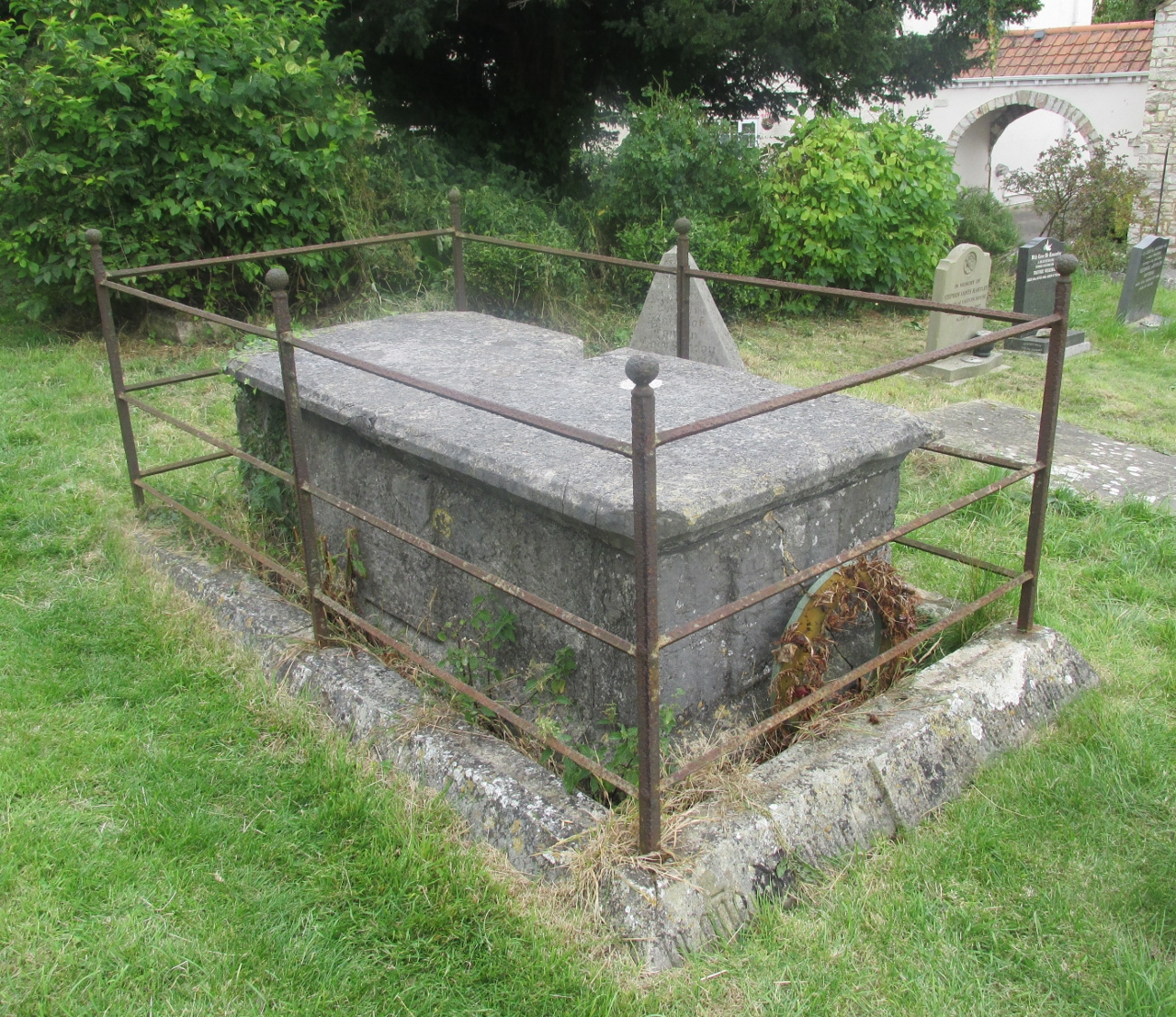
Tomb of Lord Dacre

In the churchyard is the tomb of Ralph, Lord Dacre, who died at the Battle of Towton in 1461. The tomb is made of limestone, and has an oblong plan, measuring about 1.75 metres (5 ft 9 in) by 1 metre (3 ft 3 in) and is about 1 metre (3 ft 3 in) in height. It is plain, and has weathered coats of arms on the sides and ends. It is grade II listed.

== See also ==
- Grade I listed buildings in North Yorkshire (district)
- Listed buildings in Saxton with Scarthingwell
