= Hungate baronets =

Extinct baronetcy in the Baronetage of England

The Hungate Baronetcy, of Saxton in the County of York, was a title in the Baronetage of England. It was created on 15 August 1642 for Philip Hungate. The title became extinct on the death of the sixth Baronet in 1749.

== Hungate baronets, of Saxton (1642) ==
- Sir Philip Hungate, 1st Baronet (died 1655)
- Sir Francis Hungate, 2nd Baronet (1643–1666)
- Sir Philip Hungate, 3rd Baronet (1661–1690)
- Sir Francis Hungate, 4th Baronet (1683–1710)
- Sir Philip Hungate, 5th Baronet (c. 1685 – c. 1740)
- Sir Charles Carrington Hungate, 6th Baronet (1686–1749)
