= Listed buildings in Sherburn in Elmet =

Sherburn in Elmet is a civil parish in the county of North Yorkshire, England. It contains five listed buildings that are recorded in the National Heritage List for England. Of these, one is listed at Grade I, the highest of the three grades, and the others are at Grade II, the lowest grade. The parish contains the town of Sherburn in Elmet and the surrounding area. All the listed buildings are in the northwest part of the town, and consist of a church, a cross in the churchyard, a house, a former grammar school, and a pair of shops.

== Key ==
Grade	Criteria
I	Buildings of exceptional interest, sometimes considered to be internationally important
II	Buildings of national importance and special interest

== Buildings ==
Name and location	Photograph	Date	Notes	Grade
All Saints' Church; 53.79577°N 1.26063°W		12th century	The church has been altered and extended through the centuries, including alterations by Anthony Salvin in 1857. The church is built in magnesian limestone, and consists of a nave with a clerestory, north and south aisles, a south porch, a south chapel, a chancel with a north vestry, and a west tower embraced by the aisles. The tower has two stages, massive diagonal buttresses, a southwest stair turret, a south clock face, two-light bell openings with pointed heads, and an embattled parapet with crocketed pinnacles. The nave also has an embattled parapet. The porch contains a re-set opening with a pointed arch, zigzag moulding, and shafts with waterleaf capitals. The inner doorway has a round arch and a hood mould.	I
Churchyard cross 53.79567°N 1.26052°W		Medieval	The cross is in the churchyard of All Saints' Church, to the east of the porch. It is in magnesian limestone, and about 1 metre (3 ft 3 in) in height. The cross head is earlier than the base, and has a truncated shaft with a decorated wheel head, and a portion of the carved base of a stone cross.	II
63 and 65 Kirkgate; 53.79648°N 1.25792°W		16th century	A farmhouse, later a private house, in stone, with quoins and a pantile roof. There are two storeys and five bays. On the front is a doorway with a flat hood, and the windows are casements. Inside, there are inglenook fireplaces.	II
Former grammar school 53.79783°N 1.25218°W		1619	Originally a grammar school, later used for other purposes, it is in magnesian limestone, mainly rendered, on a plinth, with quoins, and it has a Welsh slate roof and gables with moulded coping. There are two storeys, a U-shaped plan, and a front range of four bays. In the centre is a round-arched entrance with a wide surround on a moulded base, above which is a cartouche with a coat of arms. Most of the windows are mullioned or mullioned and transomed, and there is a single-light window and a sash window, all with hood moulds. On the left return is a doorway with a Tudor arch and chamfered jambs.	II
2 and 4 Finkle Hill; 53.79781°N 1.25187°W		17th century	A pair of houses, later shops, in magnesian limestone, with a plinth on the right, and a Welsh slate roof. There are three storeys and three bays. In the centre are paired doorways, the left converted into a window, the other a doorway with a radial fanlight, each in a moulded architrave, with a joint frieze and hood. To the left is a 20th-century shopfront, and to the right is a shop window with pilasters, a frieze and a hood. The upper floors contain sash windows with wedge lintels.	II
