= Listed buildings in Barkston Ash =

Barkston Ash is a civil parish in the county of North Yorkshire, England. It contains five listed buildings that are recorded in the National Heritage List for England. All the listed buildings are designated at Grade II, the lowest of the three grades, which is applied to "buildings of national importance and special interest". The parish contains the village of Barkston Ash and the surrounding area, and the listed buildings consist of houses, farmhouses and a milestone.

== Buildings ==
Name and location	Photograph	Date	Notes
Turpin Hall Farm; 53.81815°N 1.25374°W	—	Mid 17th century	The farmhouse has a timber-framed rear wall, the rest is in rendered magnesian limestone, and it has a tile roof with stone kneelers. There are two storeys and three bays. The doorway is in the centre, it is flanked by bay windows, and in the upper floor are casement windows. In the right gable end are chamfered mullioned windows.
Laurel Farm; 53.81820°N 1.25539°W	—	Early to mid 18th century (probable)	A rendered farmhouse that has a tile swept roof with rendered coping. There are two storeys and three bays, and a rear outshut. On the front is a doorway, and the windows are horizontally-sliding sashes.
Scarthingwell Lodge; 53.82022°N 1.25839°W		Mid 18th century	The house is in magnesian limestone, partly rendered, and has a pantile roof with stone kneelers. There are two storeys and two bays. The doorway is in the centre, and the windows are horizontally-sliding sashes.
Barkston House; 53.81797°N 1.25421°W		Early 19th century (probable)	A house in magnesian limestone that has a Welsh slate roof with stone copings and kneelers. There are three storeys and three bays. In the centre is a round-arched doorway with a radial fanlight. The windows in the lower two floors are in aluminium and pivoted in the original openings, and all the windows have wedge lintels.
Milestone; 53.80962°N 1.25624°W		Late 19th century	The milestone is on the east side of London Road (A162 road). It is in stone with a cast iron plaque, it has a triangular plan with a semicircular head, and is about 1 metre (3 ft 3 in) high. On the top is a raised inscription reading "TADCASTER & DONCASTER ROAD" and "BARKSTON", on the north side are the distances to Doncaster, Pontefract and Ferrybridge, and on the south side the distances to York and Tadcaster.
