= Ryther cum Ossendyke =

Civil parish in North Yorkshire, England

Coordinates: 53.847969°N 1.157486°W

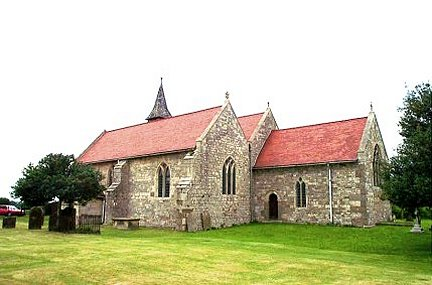
- All Saints Church, Ryther

- Location within North Yorkshire
- Population: 241 (2011 census)
- Civil parish: Ryther cum Ossendyke
- Unitary authority: North Yorkshire
- Ceremonial county: North Yorkshire
- Region: Yorkshire and the Humber
- Country: England
- Sovereign state: United Kingdom
- Post town: Tadcaster
- Postcode district: LS24
- Dialling code: 01757
- Police: North Yorkshire
- Fire: North Yorkshire
- Ambulance: Yorkshire

Ryther cum Ossendyke is a civil parish 6 miles (9.7 km) from Tadcaster and 6 miles (9.7 km) from Selby, North Yorkshire, England. It includes the village of Ryther. The civil parish population at the 2011 census was 241.

== History ==
Ryther-with-Ossendyke was a parish in the wapentake of Barkston Ash historically in the West Riding of Yorkshire until 1974. From 1974 to 2023 it was part of the Selby District, it is now administered by the unitary North Yorkshire Council.

The parish is situated on the south side of the River Wharfe, which forms part of the parish boundary. It covered 1,074 hectares and contained the township of Lead Hall about six miles to the west, where there is St Mary's Chapel, a chapel of ease of Ryther's parish church, All Saints' Church (13th century).

The origin of the village name 'Ryther' is uncertain. Eilert Ekwall, in the Concise Oxford Dictionary of English Place-Names, rejected an earlier derivation from a putative Old English word gytheru ('clearing'); he instead proposed hryther-ea, 'cattle-isle'. However, more modern scholarship has argued that an unrecorded Old English ryðer, derived from roð 'clearing' with the suffix -er is more likely.

Ozendyke is a hamlet two miles to the west of Ryther, along the B1223 toward Ulleskelf. Historical spellings included: Osmundayk in 1304, Osmundesayk (1323), Osmondak(e) (1438,1450), Ossendak (1491), Hossindike (1535), Os(s)ingdike (1540, 1549), Ossendike (1588, 1595), and Osendyke (1641). The name meant 'Osmund's eik' (oak), later misunderstood as ending in '-dyke'.

Ryther village contains a Methodist chapel (now disused), the Rythre Arms public house, and a village hall. There were formerly at least two pubs or inns. From the 12th to the 16th century the village was the site of Ryther Castle, the principal seat of the ancient de Rhythre/Ryther family, the Lords of Scarcroft who inherited Harewood Castle in about 1400. Several of the de Ryther family have effigies in All Saints' Church. The village once had several shops but now has none. Historically, census returns show that many residents were farm labourers or worked in the larger village of Cawood three miles to the south-east.

The estate of Ryther was owned by the Barons Haversham, who bequeathed it to Thomas Corbett (Lincolnshire MP) in the 1830s.

== Geography ==
Approximately equidistant between Tadcaster and Selby, Ryther is a lowland street village on the south bank of the River Wharfe, which is tidal at that point (tides extend up the Wharfe as far as Ulleskelf). It lies between 26 and 33 feet (8 and 10 m) above sea level on the Humberhead Levels. The Wharfe flows into the River Ouse around 1.9 miles (3 km) to the east. Ryther and Ossendyke Ings are within the parish. It has always been vulnerable to the frequent flooding of the rivers Wharfe and Ouse. Most of the parish is arable farmland with a little mixed farming. This part of Yorkshire typically produces barley, wheat, oilseed rape, sugar beet and potatoes; along the river the meadows and embankments are used for grazing sheep and cattle. There is little woodland in the parish.

In the late twentieth century, a number of new houses extended the village southwards along Mill Lane. The village hall stands approximately 0.3 miles (0.5 km) to the west of the main settlement, near the Selby Diversion section of the East Coast Main Line. Ryther never had a railway station; the nearest is Ulleskelf railway station (approximately 1.9 miles (3 km) west) although the Cawood, Wistow and Selby Light Railway formerly ran from Cawood railway station (1.2 miles (2 km) south-east) to Selby. The church stands on the eastern side of the village on the edge of Ryther Ings, adjacent to Ryther Hall. A stream, the Pailbank Drain, runs north to south through this end of the village, draining via a marshy slough into the Wharfe, separating church and hall from the village and causing the road to divert at right angles away from the river.

Leeds East Airport, formerly RAF Church Fenton, lies 1.2 miles (2 km) south-west of the village.
