= Sherburn High School =

Location
- Garden Lane; Sherburn in Elmet, North Yorkshire, LS25 6AS; England
- 53.790743°N 1.257089°W

Information
- Type: Academy
- Motto: Achievement for all
- Local authority: North Yorkshire Council
- Trust: Yorkshire Learning Trust
- Department for Education URN: 145819 Tables
- Ofsted: Reports
- Gender: Coeducational
- Age: 11 to 18
- Enrolment: 915
- Houses: Newby, Bramham, Lotherton and Harewood
- Website: http://www.sherburnhigh.co.uk

Sherburn High School is a coeducational secondary school and sixth form located in Sherburn in Elmet in Selby, North Yorkshire, England. It has around 915 pupils aged 11 to 18 years.

Previously a community school administered by North Yorkshire County Council, in October 2019 Sherburn High School converted to academy status. The school is now a member of the Yorkshire Learning Trust.
