= Church of the Immaculate Conception, Scarthingwell =

Church in North Yorkshire, England

Coordinates: 53°49′33″N 1°15′14″W

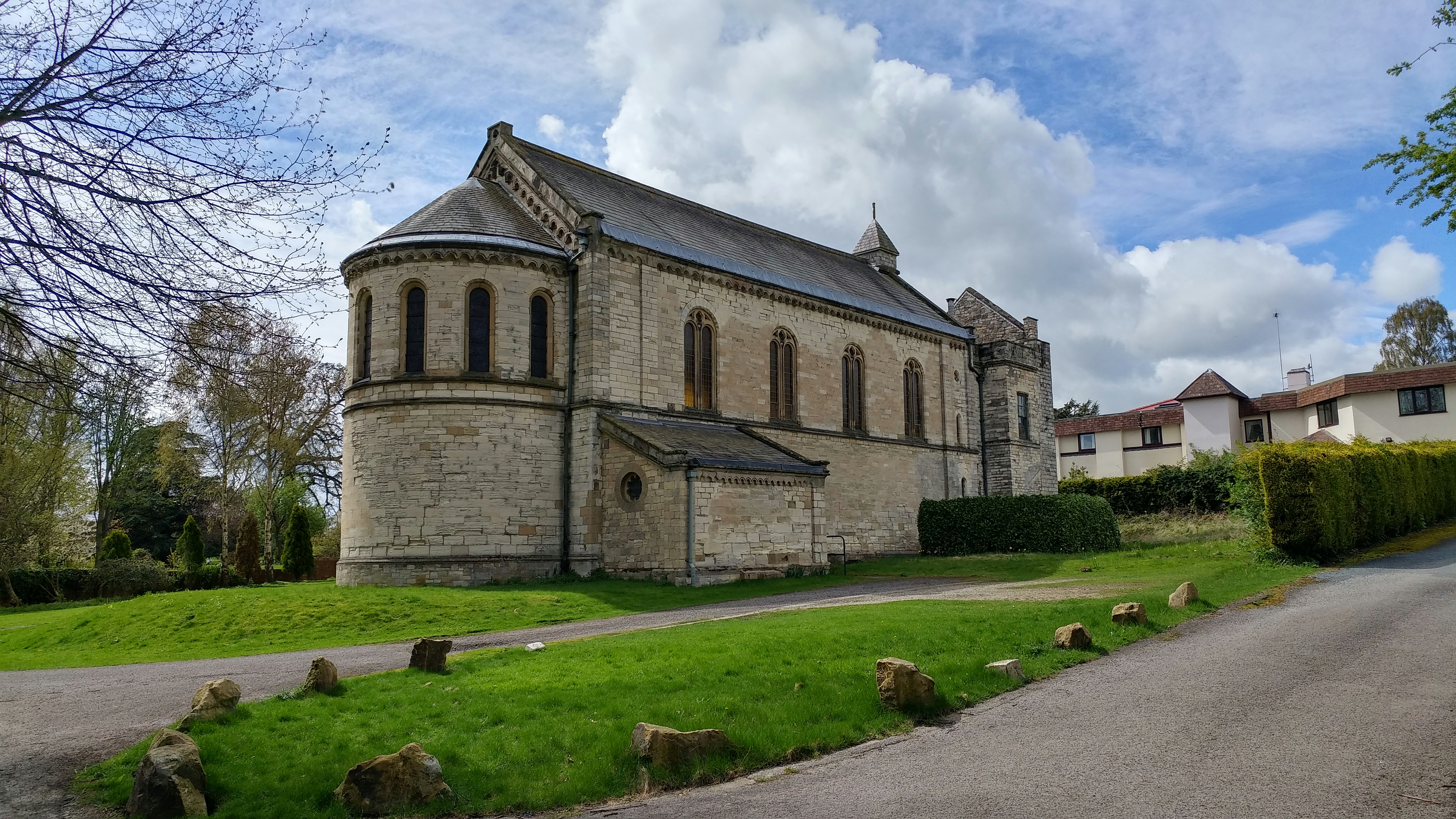
The church from the north-east, in 2018

The Church of the Immaculate Conception is a historic church in Scarthingwell, in North Yorkshire, in England.

The church was constructed in 1854 to a design by John Bownas and William Atkinson. It was commissioned by Edward William Hawke-Harvey, 4th Baron Hawke, as a private chapel for his seat, Scarthingwell Hall. It was the first church in England to be dedicated to the Immaculate Conception. The hall was demolished in 1960, but the chapel survived as a Roman Catholic church. It was Grade II listed in 1988.

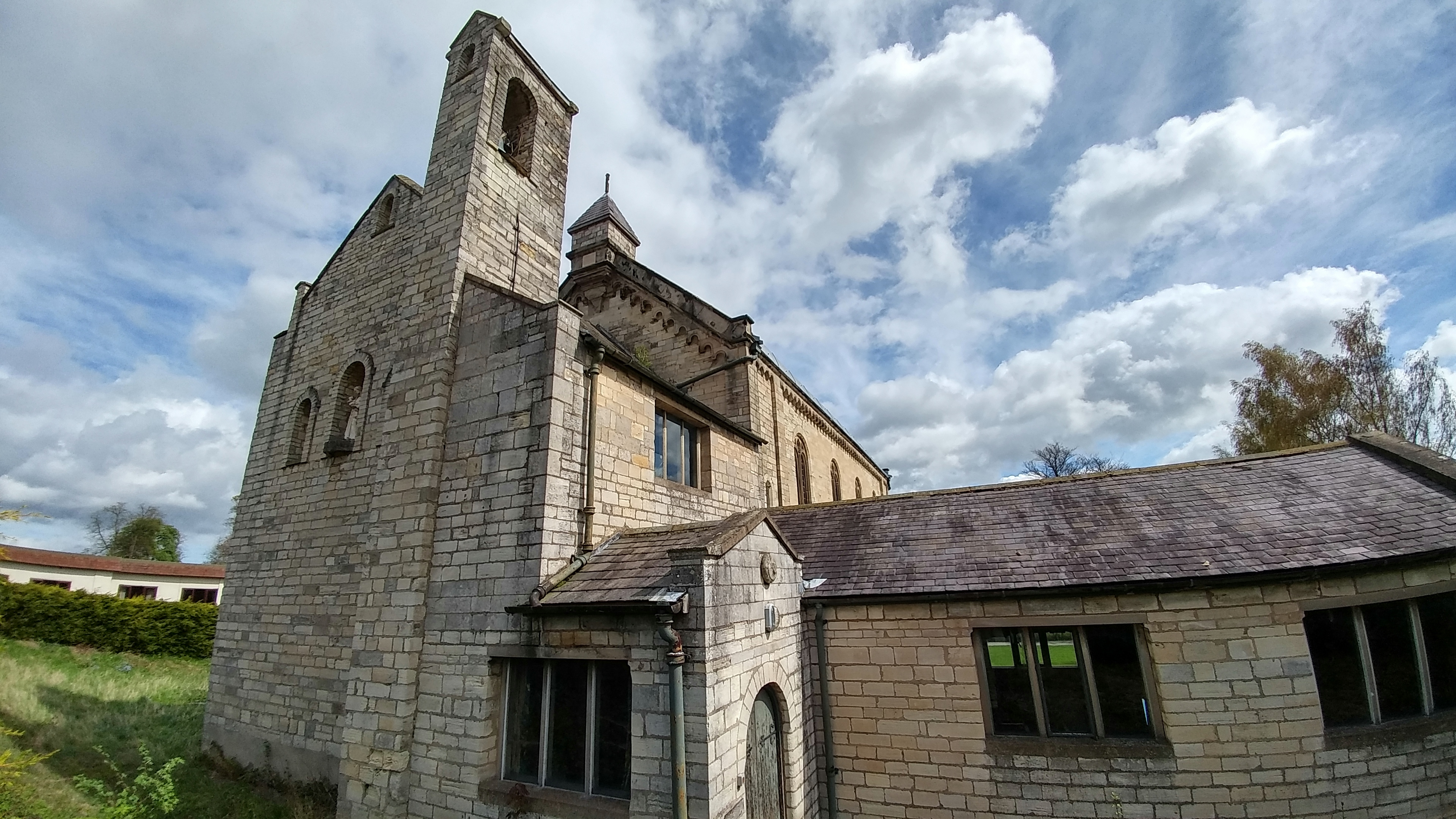
The church from the south-west, in 2018

The church is in the Norman style, built of limestone, with a slate roof. It has a nave with a chancel in the form of an apse. The west end is gabled, and houses four niches. There is also a small stone turret at the west end. The nave has four tall windows, each with two lights, while the chancel has seven lancet windows. Inside, there is highly decorative plasterwork and a wooden gallery at the west end, reached by a staircase, which originally housed the family pew, but now contains an organ.

== See also ==
- Listed buildings in Saxton with Scarthingwell
