= St Mary's Chapel, Lead =

Coordinates: 53.8263°N 1.2963°W

St Mary's Church, Lead
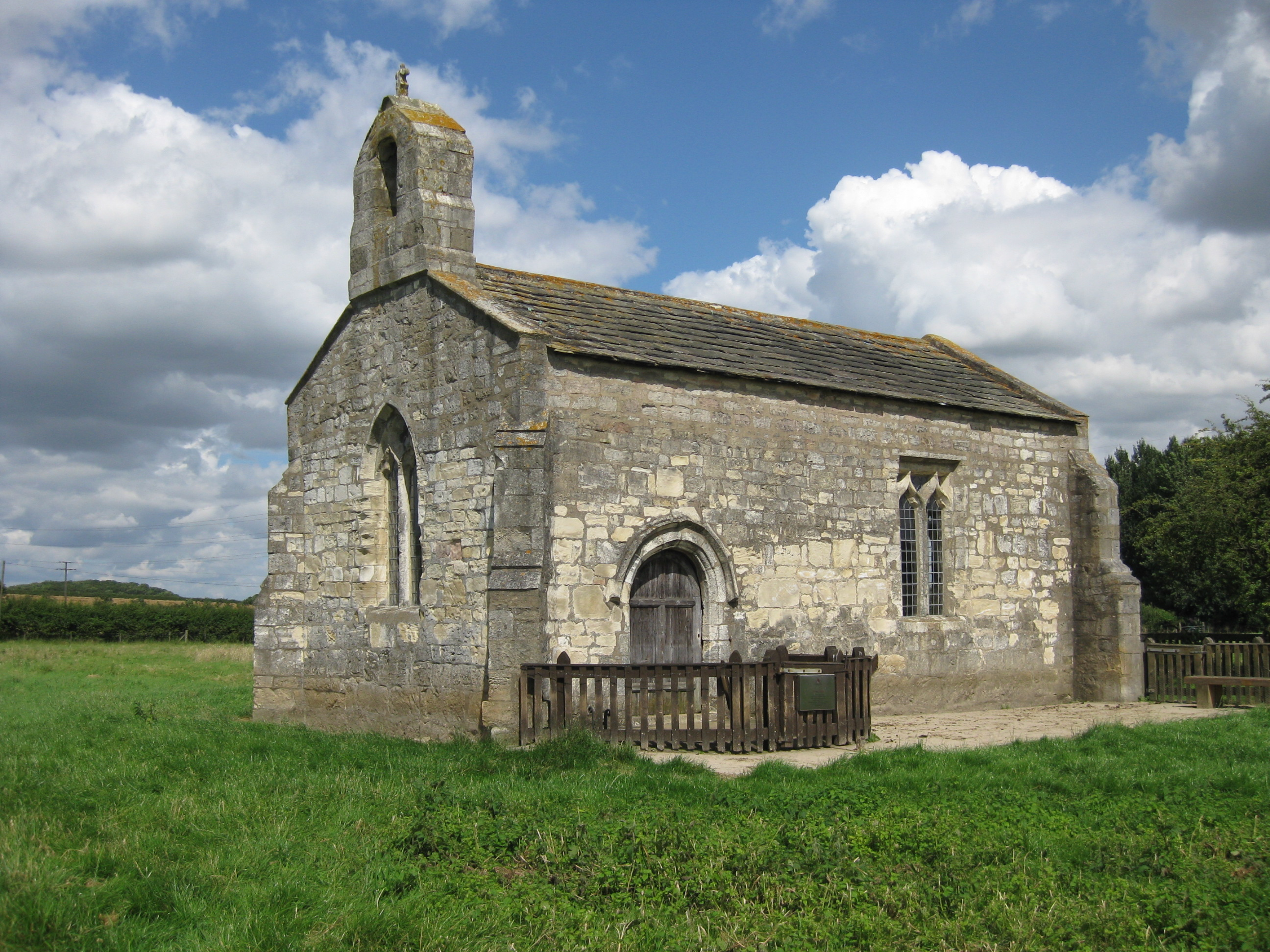
- St Mary's Chapel, Lead, from the south

- Location in North Yorkshire
- OS grid reference: SE 464 368
- Location: Near Saxton, North Yorkshire
- Country: England
- Denomination: Anglican
- Website: Churches Conservation Trust

Architecture
- Functional status: Redundant
- Groundbreaking: 14th century

Specifications
- Length: 18 feet (5.5 m)
- Materials: Stone

St Mary's Church, Lead, is a redundant Anglican chapel standing in an isolated position in fields in the civil parish of Lead, some 0.75 miles (1.2 km) to the west of the village of Saxton, North Yorkshire, England. Though technically a chapel, it is generally referred to as a church. It is managed by The Churches Conservation Trust, and is recorded in the National Heritage List for England as a designated Grade II* listed building. The chapel stands close to the site of the Battle of Towton of 1461, which was part of the Wars of the Roses. In the 1930s it was saved from neglect by a local group of ramblers, and is known locally as the Ramblers' Church.

== History ==
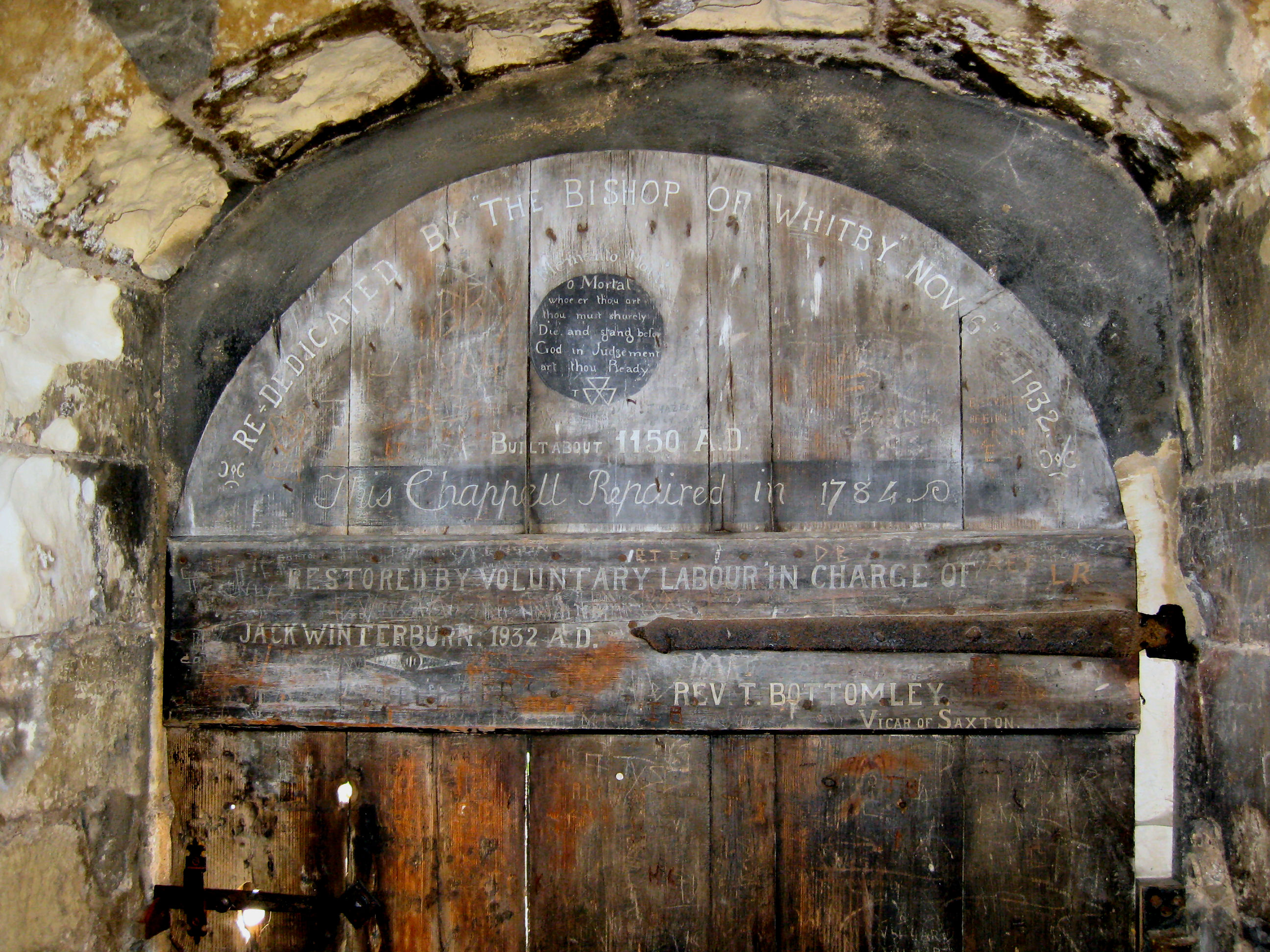
Door inside giving some dates of restoration, probably 18th century

The chapel dates from the 14th century and was probably the chapel for a medieval manor house which no longer exists. It is thought that it was built for the Tyas family. Additions were made to the chapel in the 18th century. There is evidence that an earlier chapel existed on the site, because in 1934 excavations revealed a grave slab dating from the 9th or 10th century, and the foundations of a larger church or chapel some 23 feet (7.0 m) long that contained two stone coffins. In the late 19th and early 20th centuries repairs to the chapel were carried out, and in 1912 it was incorporated into the parish of Saxton; before this time it had been a chapelry. However, by 1931 it had fallen into ruin, but it was saved by a group of local ramblers. Repairs were carried out, the 18th-century communion rails were removed, the three-decker pulpit was moved into the northeast corner of the chapel, a stone altar was built, and the medieval altar slab was laid on its top. It is thought that the font was also moved at this time. On 6 November 1932 the chapel was re-dedicated. Further restoration work was carried out in 1934. Due to the decline of the local population later in the 20th century, the chapel was declared redundant, and it came under the care of the Churches Conservation Trust in 1980. It is now maintained privately.

== Architecture ==
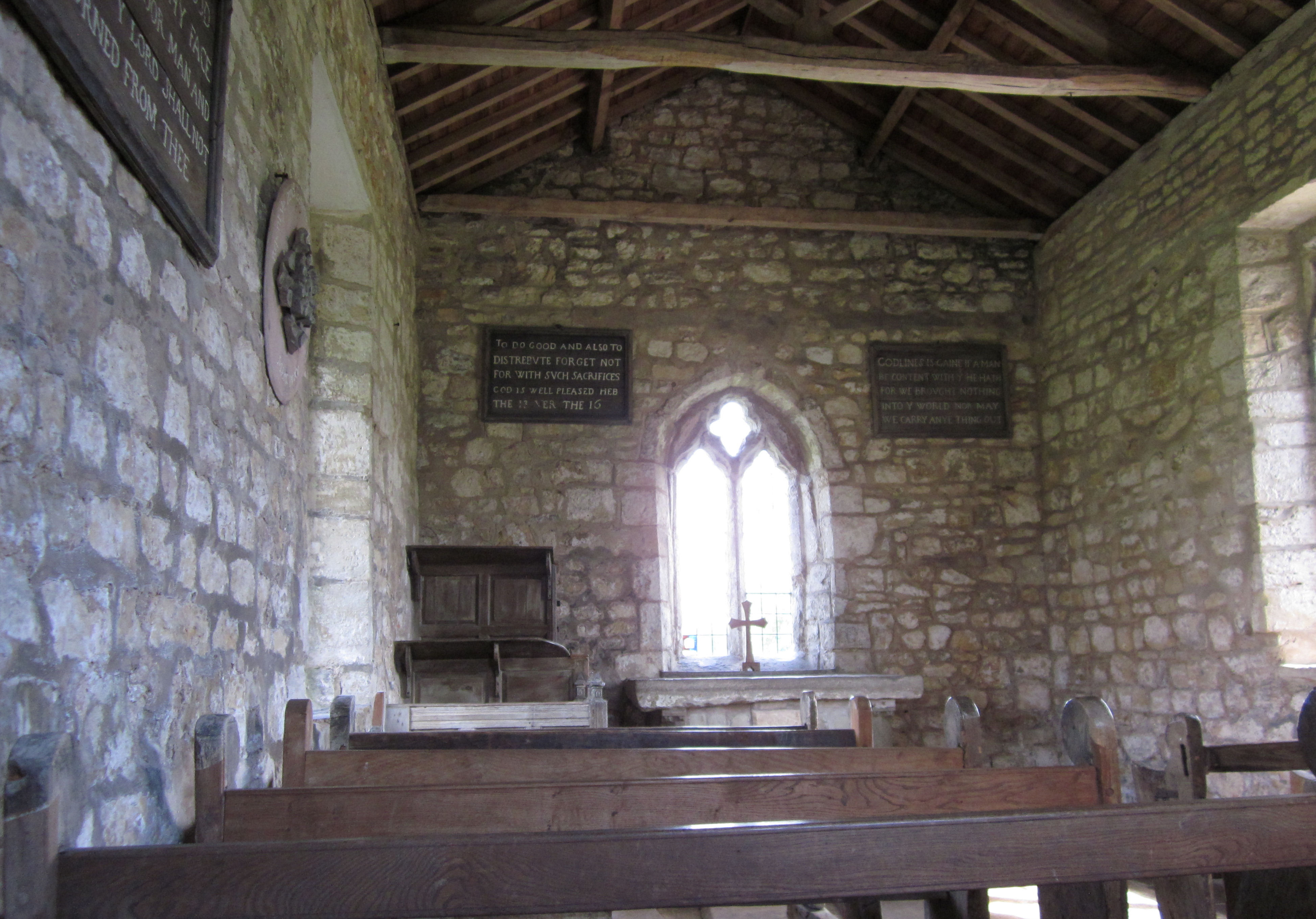
Interior with pulpit, altar and window

St Mary's is a small chapel, built in stone, some 18 feet (5.5 m) long, with a rectangular plan, and a bellcote at the west end. Its interior is very simple, containing benches dating possibly from the medieval period. On the east wall of the chapel are boards containing sentences from the Holy Communion service dating from the 18th century. Also in the chapel are a three-decker pulpit, a stone altar, and a font.

== Friends of Lead Church ==
St Mary's is maintained by a group called the Friends of Lead Church and there is an annual service.

== See also ==
- List of churches preserved by the Churches Conservation Trust in Northern England
- Walesby, Lincolnshire where All Saints' is also known as the 'Ramblers' Church'
