= All Saints' Church, Sherburn in Elmet =

Church in Sherburn in Elmet, North Yorkshire, England

Coordinates: 53°47′45″N 01°15′38″W

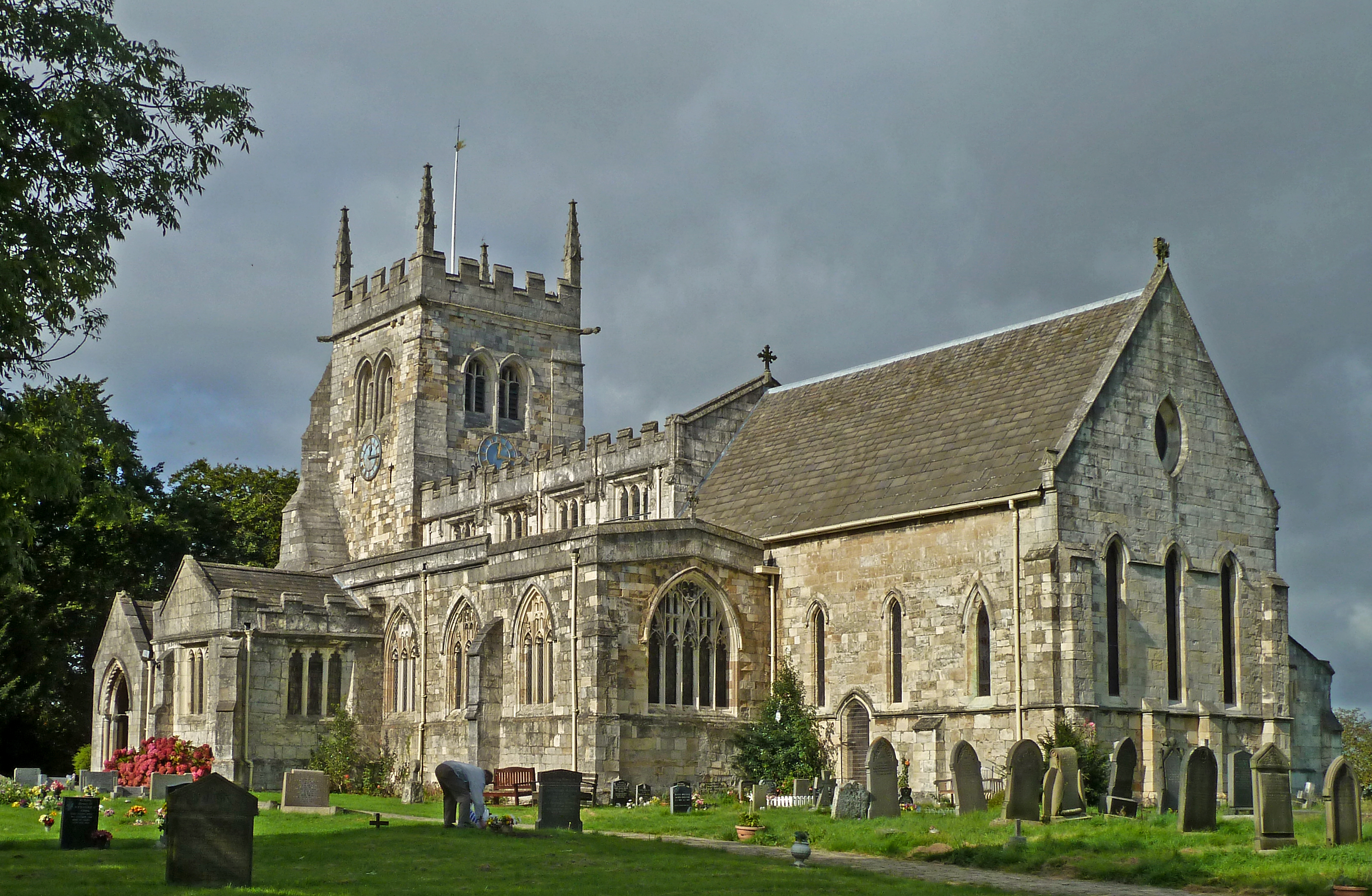
The church from the south-west, in 2016

All Saints' Church is the parish church of Sherburn in Elmet, a town in North Yorkshire in England.

The church was constructed in the 12th century, from which period the nave and part of the north aisle date. It is known that there was an earlier church on the site, and the current building appears to reuse some large, Anglo-Saxon stones. The chancel was added in the 13th century, followed by the south aisle and an extension to the north aisle in the 14th century, and the south chapel in the 15th century. The clerestory dates from the 16th century, and the tower was heightened at a later date. In 1857, Anthony Salvin restored the church and added a vestry. The church was grade I listed in 1967.

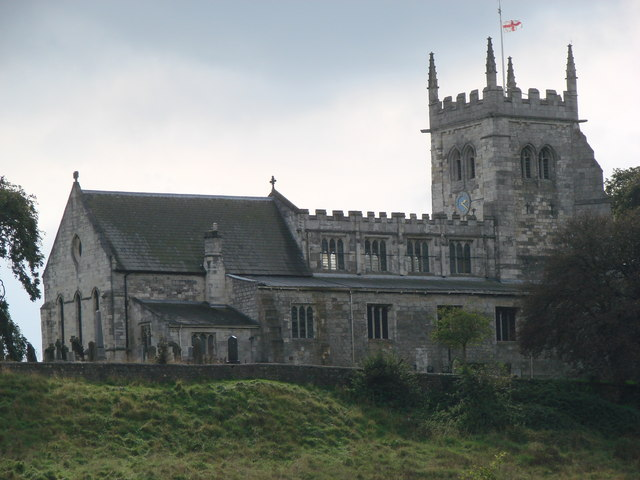
The church from the north-west, in 2006

The church is built of Magnesian Limestone. It has a four-bay nave, with a two-bay tower, and a two-bay chancel. The tower is supported by large diagonal buttresses, added in the Victorian period. It has paired openings around the bells, and is topped by battlements. Although the porch is largely the work of Salvin, it reuses 12th century material, including zigzag carvings. Most of the nave windows are Perpendicular, while the chancel windows are lancets which date from the Victorian restoration.

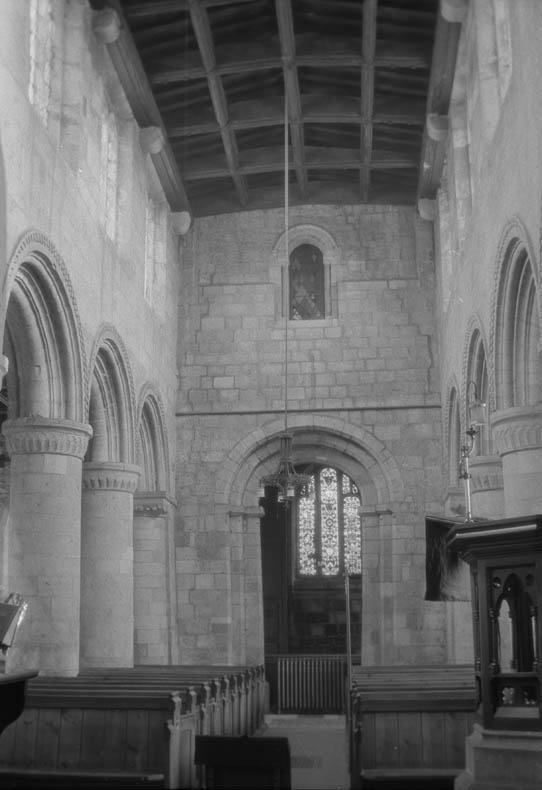
View from the nave towards the tower, in 1929

Inside the church, there is a round tower arch, with a round-arched window above. Between the south aisle and the chancel is an ogee arched window. There is a shell-shaped piscina in the chantry chapel. The 15th-century Janus Cross was moved from the ruins of the demolished St Mary and All Holy Angels Chapel, formerly in the churchyard, and it is now displayed in two parts. The organ was made by Brindley and Foster and dates from 1875. There is a 14th-century grave slab under the tower, and a tablet dedicated to Peter Foljambe, who died in 1668.

The west window contains 15th century glass. Some bells date from 1750, and the others are Victorian. The oak pews and pulpit were installed in 1857.

== See also ==
- Grade I listed buildings in North Yorkshire (district)
- Listed buildings in Sherburn in Elmet
