= Sherburn in Elmet =

Village and civil parish in North Yorkshire, England

Coordinates: 53°47′46″N 1°14′54″W

- Village and Civil Parish
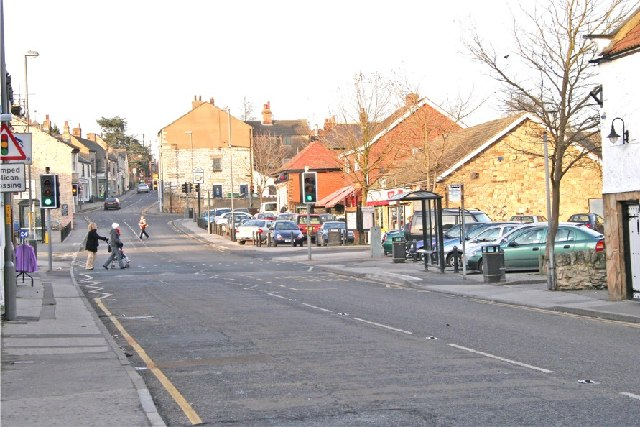
- Sherburn village centre

- Location within North Yorkshire
- Population: 8,572 (2021 census)
- OS grid reference: SE506337
- Civil parish: Sherburn in Elmet
- Unitary authority: North Yorkshire
- Ceremonial county: North Yorkshire
- Region: Yorkshire and the Humber
- Country: England
- Sovereign state: United Kingdom
- Post town: LEEDS
- Postcode district: LS25
- Dialling code: 01977
- Police: North Yorkshire
- Fire: North Yorkshire
- Ambulance: Yorkshire
- UK Parliament: Selby

Sherburn in Elmet (pronounced /ˈʃɜːrbərnɪnˈɛlmɪt/ SHUR-bər-nin-EL-mit) is a town and civil parish in the district and county of North Yorkshire, England. It is to the west of Selby and south of Tadcaster.

From 1974 to 2023 it was part of the Selby District, it is now administered by the unitary North Yorkshire Council.

It is one of three placenames associated with the post-Roman kingdom of Elmet, the others being Barwick-in-Elmet and Scholes-in-Elmet. At the 2021 census, it had a population of 8,572.

== History ==
The name derives from Old English "scir" (bright, pure) and "burn" (bourne, stream, spring). The earliest record of the name ('Scyreburnan') dates from 963. Elmet refers to a little-understood post-Roman, Brittonic (non-Anglo-Saxon) kingdom in the area around what is now the Leeds conurbation, the precise boundaries of which are not known, but are thought to have been located at bodies of water, such as the Ouse, Aire and Wharfe rivers.

Sherburn is situated on a low hill of Permian limestone jutting out into the valley of the River Ouse, so the name may refer to the clarity of the water on the hill compared with the muddy streams on the alluvial plain below. This limestone ridge is still an important source of clear water, for example for the brewing industry at Tadcaster six miles to the north.

The Roman road connecting Castleford with Tadcaster and York ran along this ridge, and the current Low Street/Finkle Hill north–south route through the town marks its line, but little evidence of Roman settlement has been found.

An earthwork adjoining All Saints' Church is the site of Hall Garth, sometimes erroneously called 'Athelstan's Palace', a high-status dwelling given (along with the manor of Cawood) by King Athelstan to the Archbishops of York to mark his victory over the combined Scots/Norse forces at Brunanburh in 937. Hall Garth cannot be dated back with certainty to the Kingdom of Elmet prior to its absorption into the Anglo-Saxon kingdom of Northumbria in 616/7 (see Wikipedia entry for Elmet) and may have been an Anglo-Saxon rather than a Brittonic foundation.

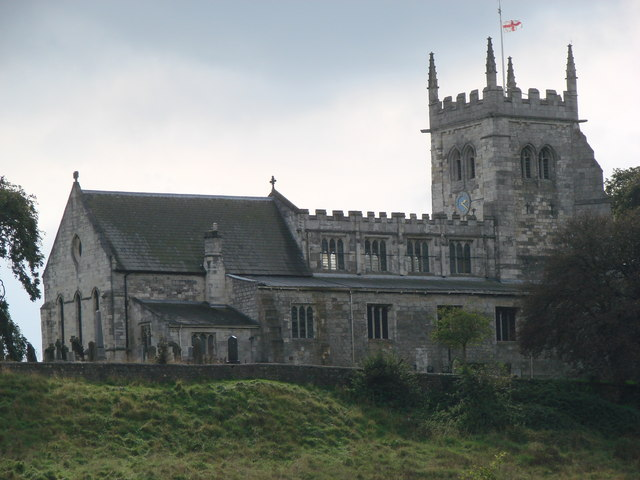
All Saints Church

The existing church, a Grade I listed building, contains features dating from c.1120: "C12 nave and north aisle, C13 chancel with C14 south aisle and extension to north aisle, C15 south aisle chapel, and later additions and alterations including C16 clerestory, north aisle windows and heightening of tower. East end restored in 1857 by Anthony Salvin and C19 vestry". It was built on the site of an earlier Anglo-Saxon church.

The town was part of the wapentake of Barkston Ash in the West Riding of Yorkshire.

The Battle of Towton was fought nearby in 1461 and local legend tells that King Edward IV, who won the battle, used the church tower as a point for surveying the battle lines. In fact the battle, the main action of which occurred between 3–4 miles (4.8–6.4 km) away, could not have been seen with any clarity from the church tower, which was not then as tall as it is today.

During the English Civil War, the town was garrisoned by the Royalists for King Charles I; it was close to their stronghold at Selby and the northern capital of York, and commanded the approaches from both the south and the west. In 1645, the Parliamentarians attacked Sherburn and defeated the garrison. On 15 October 1645 the Battle of Sherburn-in-Elmet took place. A Cavalier force commanded by Lord Digby and Sir Marmaduke Langdale attacked and initially defeated the Parliamentarian garrison now based in the town. However, another Parliamentarian force, under Colonel Copley, counterattacked and routed the Royalists. Thus was defeated the last significant Royalist force in the North during the First English Civil War.

== Notable residents ==
Ernest Popplewell, Baron Popplewell, CBE (10 December 1899 – 11 August 1977). Ernest was conferred the dignity of a Barony of the United Kingdom for life, by the name, style and title of Baron Popplewell, of Sherburn-in-Elmet in the West Riding of the County of York.

== Transport ==
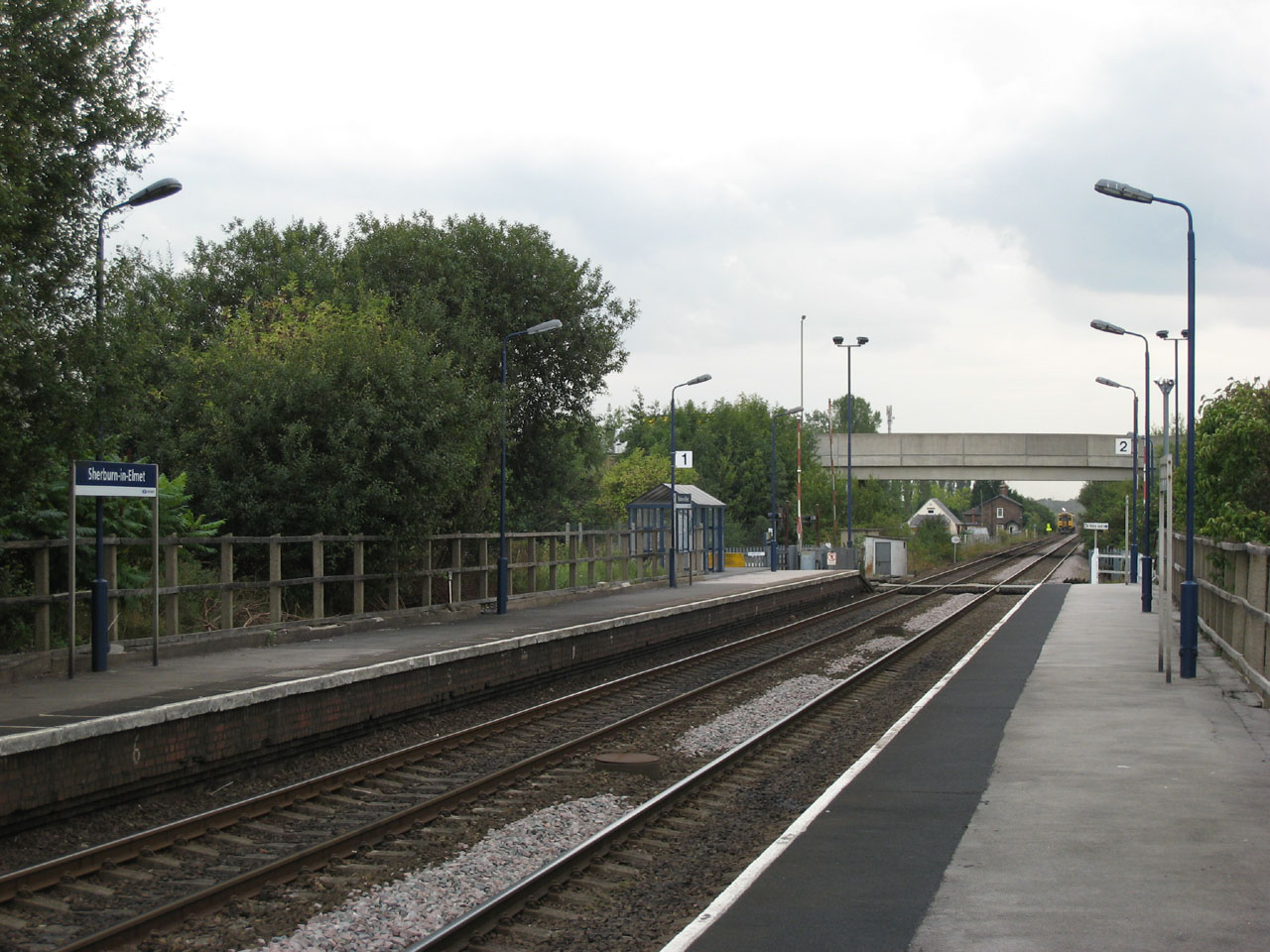
Sherburn-in-Elmet railway station

The village is served by Sherburn-in-Elmet railway station with services to York railway station, Hull Paragon Interchange and Sheffield railway station, with a second station (South Milford railway station) in nearby South Milford providing services to Leeds and Hull. Arriva Yorkshire buses go to Leeds, Tadcaster and Selby.

== Media ==
Local news and television programmes are provided by BBC Yorkshire and ITV Yorkshire. Television signals are received from the Emley Moor TV transmitter. Local radio stations are BBC Radio York on 103.7 FM, Greatest Hits Radio Yorkshire (formerly Minister FM) on 104.7 FM, YO1 Radio on 90.0 FM, Heart Yorkshire on 106.2 FM and Capital Yorkshire on 105.1 FM. The town is served by the local newspapers, The York Press and Wetherby News.

== Education ==
Sherburn in Elmet has two primary Schools and one secondary school. Its primary schools are Sherburn Hungate Primary School and Athelstan Primary School. Its secondary school is Sherburn High School, which is located on Garden Lane and is popular for its pancake race event which takes place on the first Monday back after the Easter holidays.

== See also ==
- Listed buildings in Sherburn in Elmet
