= Saxton, North Yorkshire =

Village in North Yorkshire, England

Coordinates: 53.8250°N 1.2777°W

Saxton
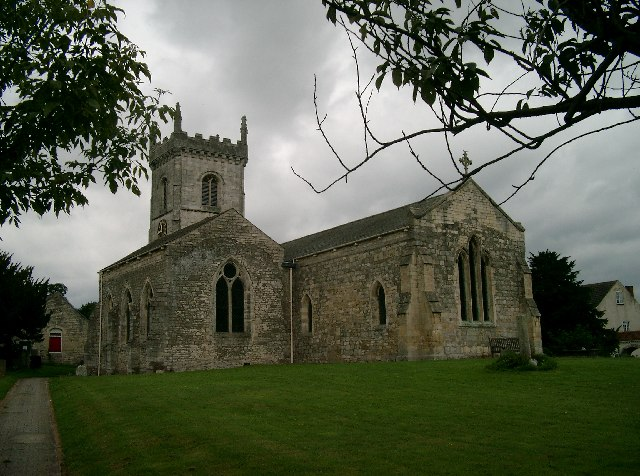
- All Saints' Church, Saxton

- Location within North Yorkshire
- Civil parish: Saxton with Scarthingwell
- Unitary authority: North Yorkshire
- Ceremonial county: North Yorkshire
- Region: Yorkshire and the Humber
- Country: England
- Sovereign state: United Kingdom
- Post town: Tadcaster
- Postcode district: LS24
- Dialling code: 01937
- Police: North Yorkshire
- Fire: North Yorkshire
- Ambulance: Yorkshire

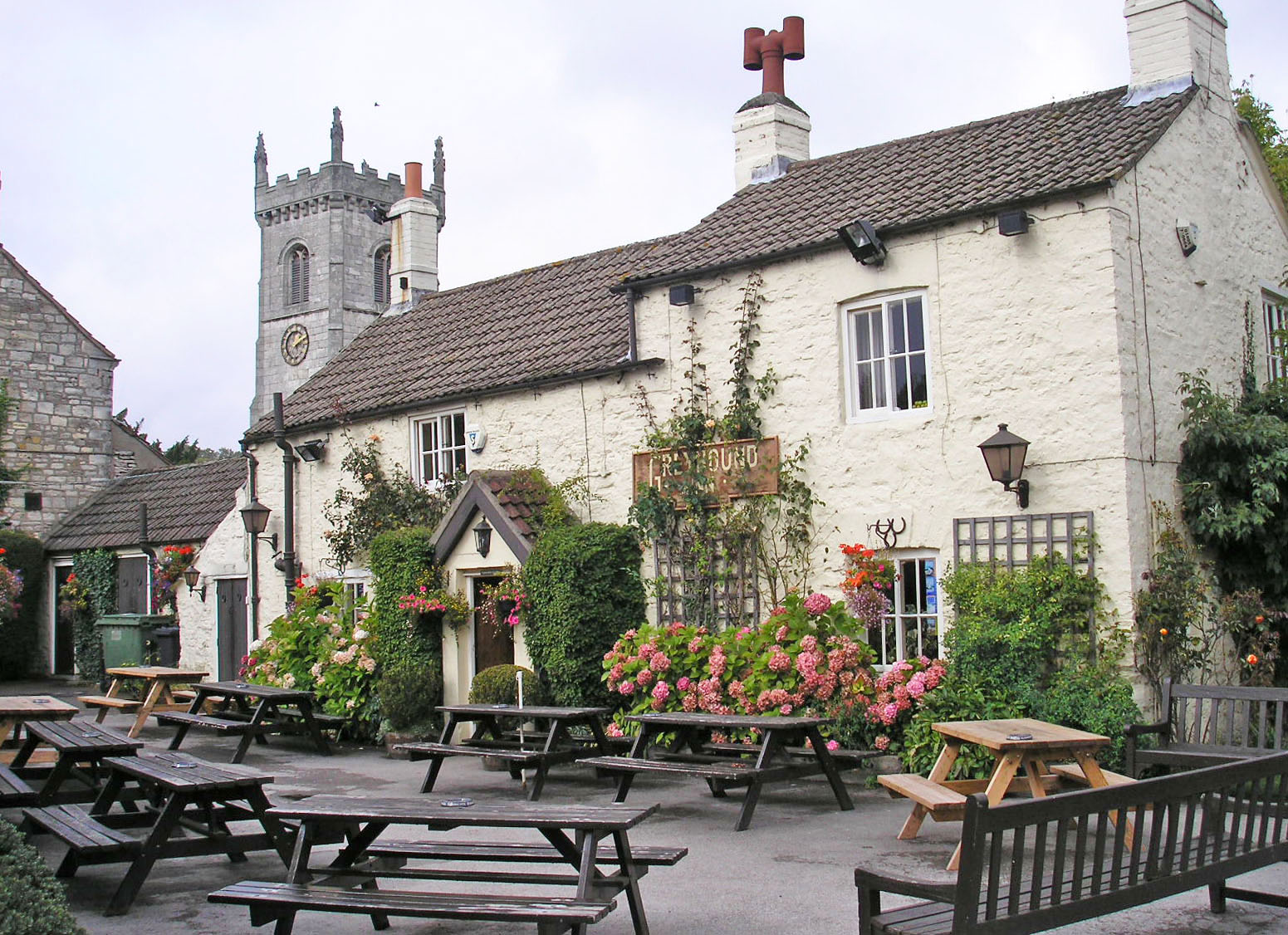
The Greyhound at Saxton

Saxton is a village in the civil parish of Saxton with Scarthingwell, in North Yorkshire, England, 14 miles (23 km) south-west of York and 12 miles (19 km) east of Leeds. The resident population is about 250. The closest town is Tadcaster.

Saxton is home to an Anglican church, a primary school, a village hall, the Greyhound public house which is owned and operated by Samuel Smith Old Brewery and a cricket club.

== History ==
The place-name 'Saxton' is attested in the Domesday Book of 1086, where it appears as Saxtun. This is from the Old English Seax-tūn, meaning 'town or settlement of the Saxons'.

A motte and bailey castle was built at Saxton. The medieval manor house that replaced the castle was demolished in the early-19th century but some earthworks of the castle's bailey and the motte survive.

All Saints' Church, Saxton is a grade I listed structure which dates to the 11th century. Some bodies of those who were killed in the Battle of Towton were buried in the churchyard. The men who gave their lives in the First World War are remembered on the War Memorial outside the church and a plaque inside the church.

The Battle of Towton was fought just north of the village.

The village was historically in the West Riding of Yorkshire until 1974. From 1974 to 2023 it was part of the Selby District, it is now administered by the unitary North Yorkshire Council.
