= Barkston Ash =

Village and civil parish in North Yorkshire, England

Coordinates: 53°49′07″N 1°15′19″W

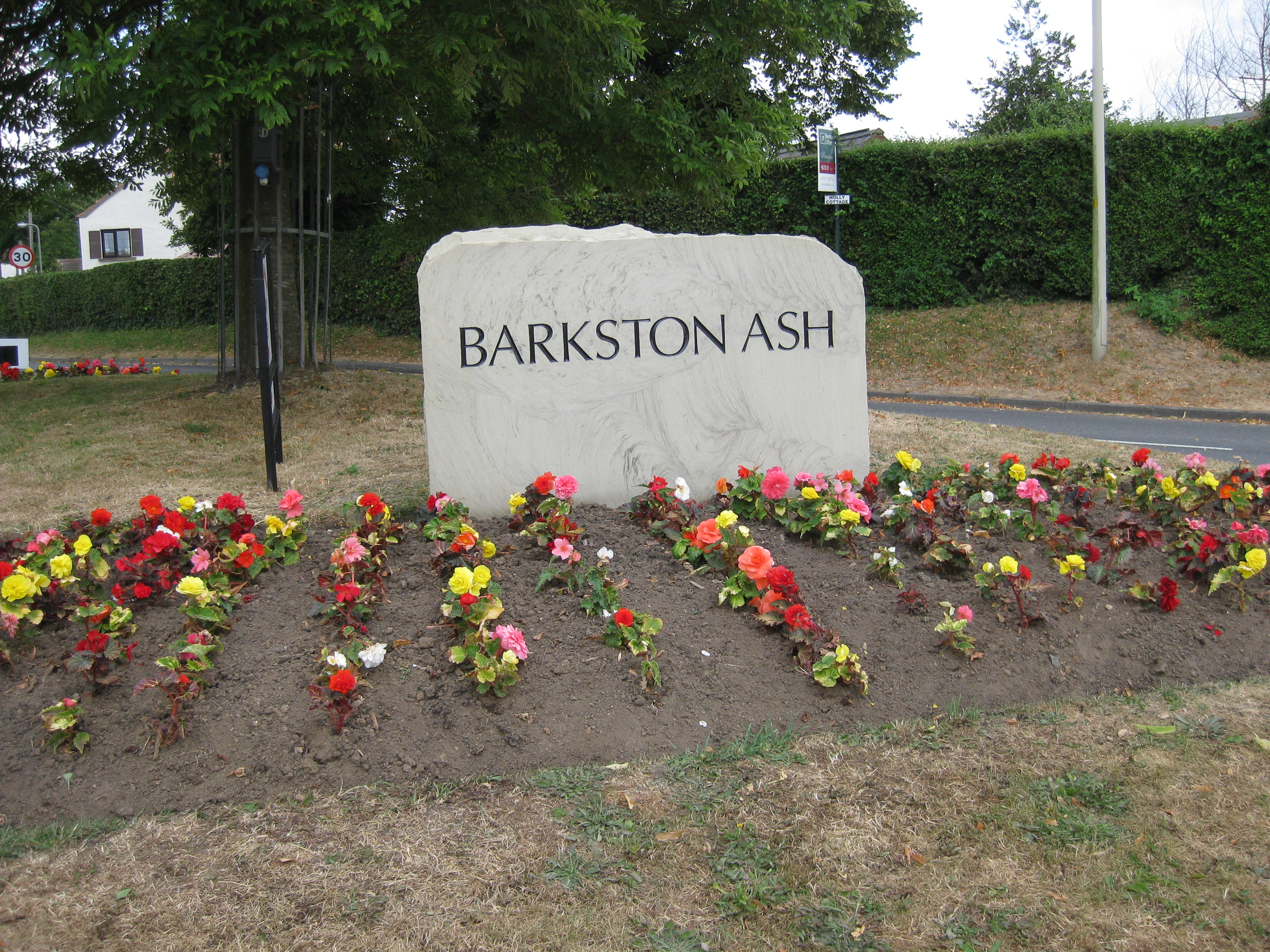
- Boundary stone on junction of Main Street with the A162 road

- Location within North Yorkshire
- Population: 370 (2011 census)
- OS grid reference: SE491361
- Civil parish: Barkston Ash
- Unitary authority: North Yorkshire
- Ceremonial county: North Yorkshire
- Region: Yorkshire and the Humber
- Country: England
- Sovereign state: United Kingdom
- Post town: TADCASTER
- Postcode district: LS24
- Police: North Yorkshire
- Fire: North Yorkshire
- Ambulance: Yorkshire

Barkston Ash is a small village and civil parish close to Selby in North Yorkshire, England. It was formerly known as Barkston, in the West Riding of Yorkshire. In 2011 the parish had a population of 370.

== History ==
The name Barkston derives from the Old Norse personal name Barkr or Borkr and the Old English tūn meaning 'settlement'. The village dates back to at least 1090, when it was spelled Barcestone. The village previously gave its name to the former wapentake of Barkston Ash. The Ash part of the name comes from a large ash tree said to be at the approximate centre of the ancient county of Yorkshire, where meetings for the wapentake would be held. From 1974 to 2023 it was part of the Selby District, it is now administered by the unitary North Yorkshire Council.

What is now the A162 London Road was a turnpike constructed in 1769: the Main Street and the major part of the village goes East from the junction with this.

On 14 October 1976 the parish was renamed from "Barkston" to "Barkston Ash".

Barkston Ash was also the name of the local parliamentary constituency of Barkston Ash until 1983, when its boundaries were redrawn to divide the area into Elmet and Selby.

== Features ==
The village contains a small Church of England church, Holy Trinity originally a chapel of ease constructed in 1880, but given its current name and status in 1974. There are two pubs, the Ash Tree (on the site of a former coaching inn) and the Boot and Shoe, a village hall and a primary school (dating from 1856). There were formerly two shops and a post office on Main Street, now private residences.

There are three 17th to 19th century stone Grade II listed building houses near the junction of Main Street and Church Street: Laurel Farm, Barkston House, and Turpin Hall Farm.

== See also ==
- Listed buildings in Barkston Ash
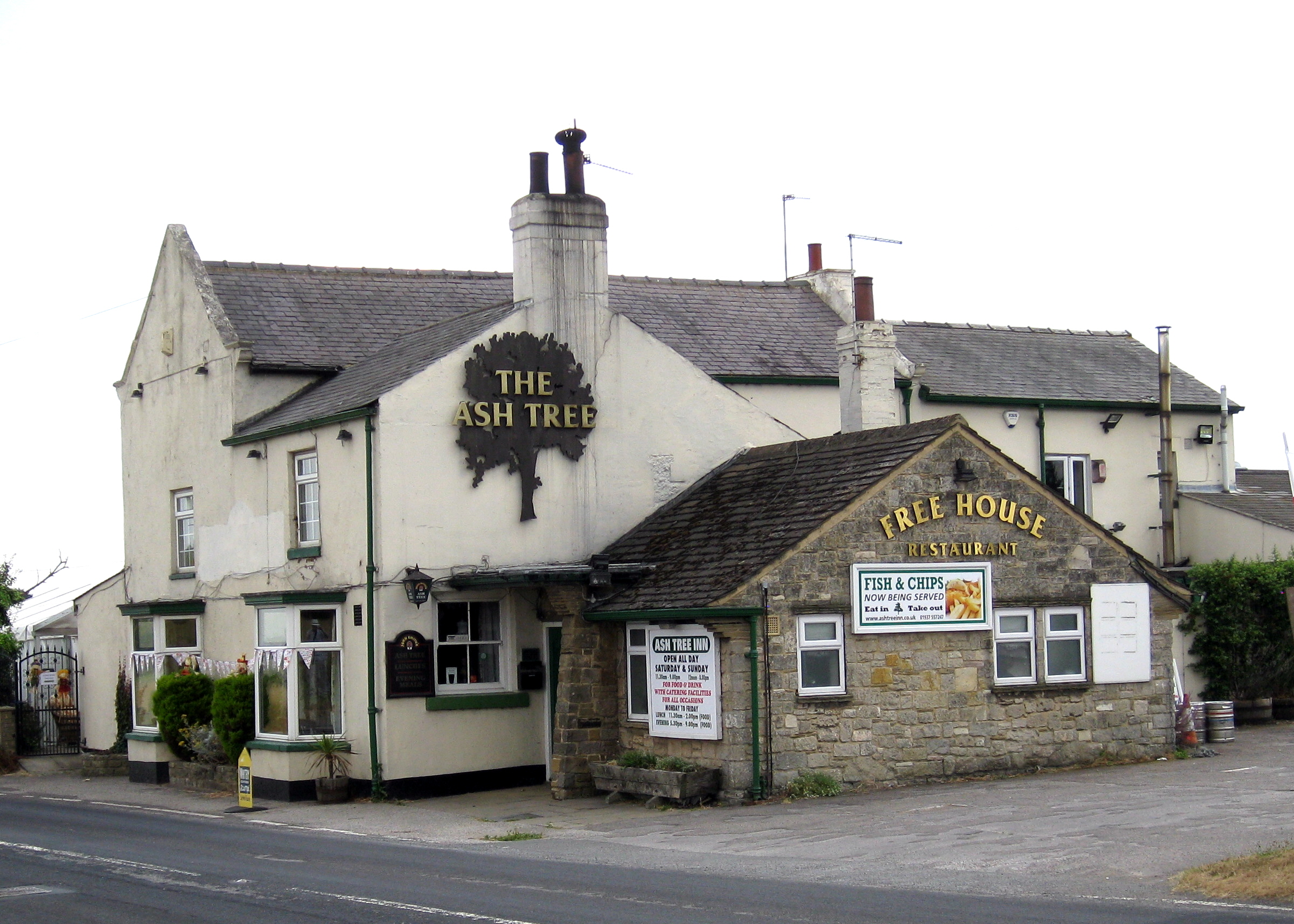
Ash Tree pub

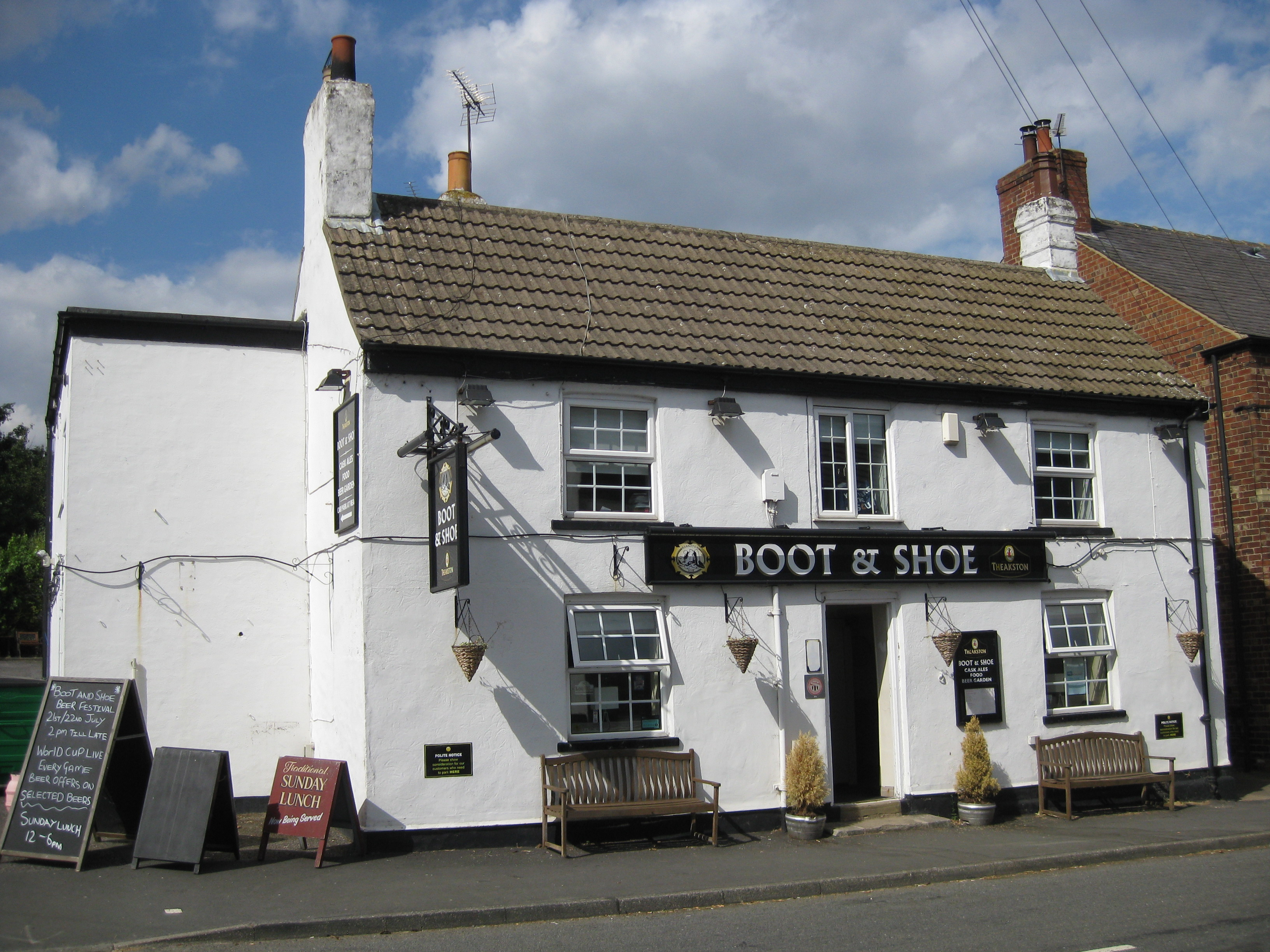
Boot and Shoe pub

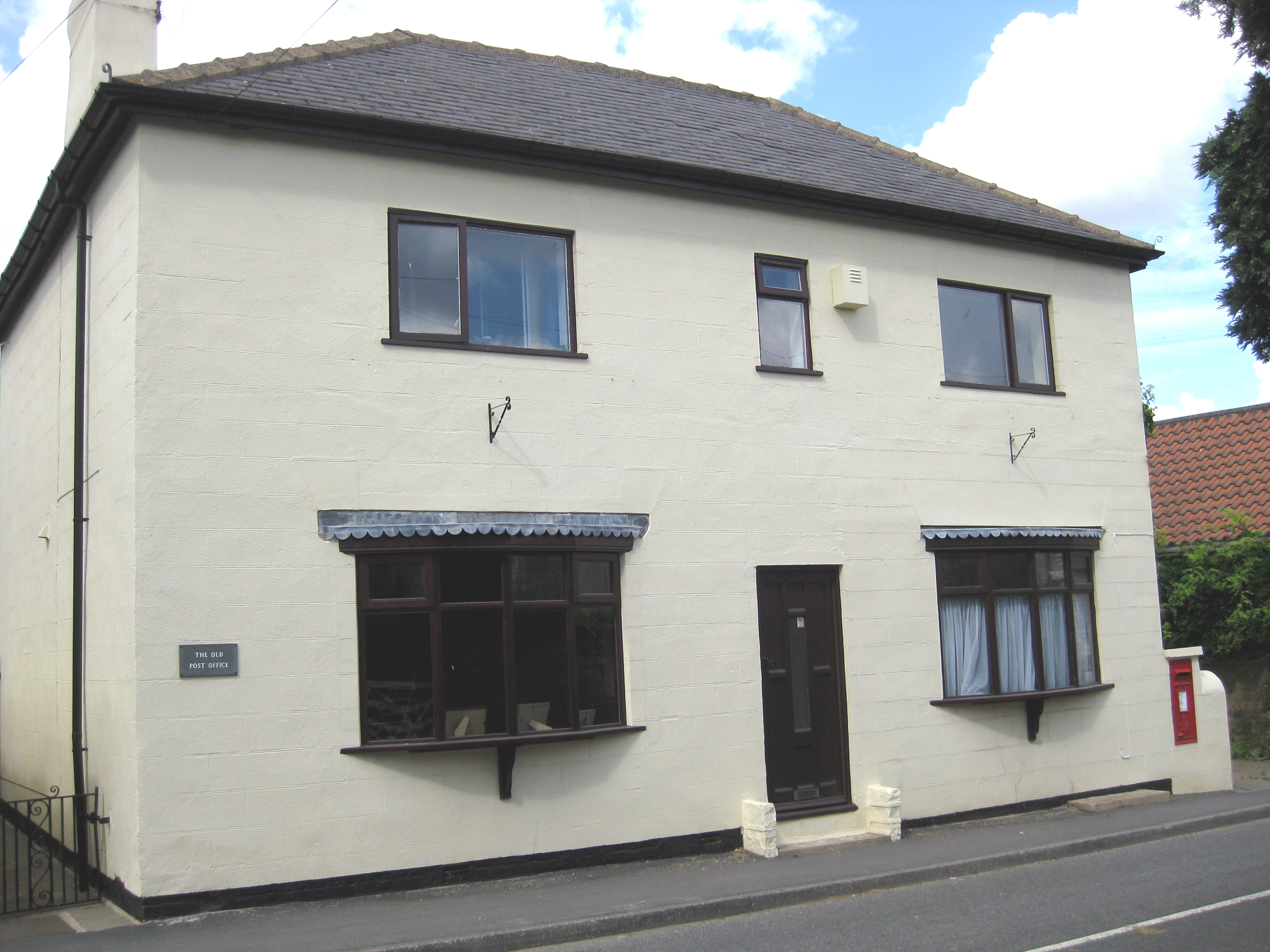
Former post office

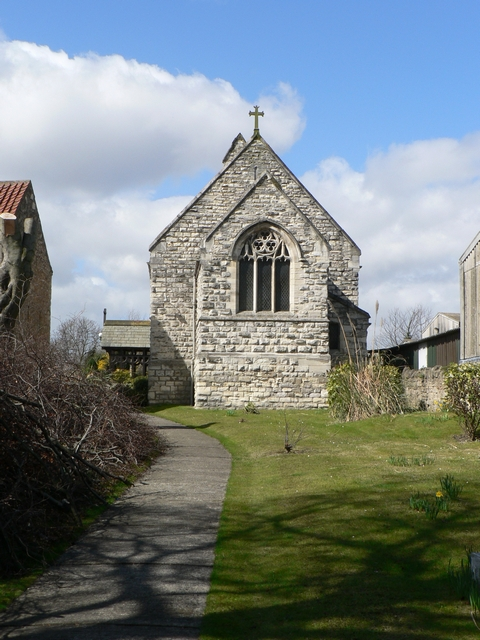
Holy Trinity Church
