= Garforth Arts Festival =

The Garforth Arts Festival was an annual arts festival that took place in Garforth, Leeds, England. The events took place over a two-week period in June and July, ending with a full-day ‘Playground Party’ on the final Saturday. The festival featured a variety of art forms, including music, theatre, comedy, circus, literature, art and dance. Most events were commissioned educational projects involving children and professional artists.

== Location ==
Events during the festival were held at the Garforth Academy, Garforth Working Men's Club, St Mary's Church and Garforth Miner's Welfare Hall. The ‘Playground Party’ was held in the sunken playground outside Garforth Academy with some acts performing on Garforth Main Street.

== Festivals ==
’05 The festival was launched in 2005 and took place over eight days. It saw collaborations between the SLP College and the Breeze International Youth Festival. The festival had a musical procession from Garforth Main Street to the college, led by The Peace Artistes. The Zimbabwean dance group Siyaya worked with local primary schools as part of the festival.

’06 In 2006 the festival was extended to nine days, with similar diversity throughout the festival and more acts. Dennis Rollins’ Badbone & Co headlined the main event. Also appearing in the festival were: Snake Davis; Cara Dillon and Chumbawamba.

’07 The festival grew to 11 days in 2007. Events included a masterclass and a concert with innovative string quartet Brodsky Quartet; Sean Hargreaves Trio; North Stars Steel Pan Orchestra and poetry from broadcaster and poet Ian McMillan. The Playground Party saw performances from: Cara Robinson, Eliza Carthy; James Taylor Quartet; Kate Rusby and headliner Courtney Pine.

’08 Expanding again, the 2008 festival was 13 days long, and involved the opening of a 'Playground Party Second Stage' for local groups such as folk ensemble ‘Slania’. There were talks by Tony Benn and Gervase Phinn. Also performing was Soweto Kinch, with support from Garforth Jazz Rock Band, and the Brighouse and Rastrick Band. The Playground Party saw 3 Daft Monkeys; Leeds band Middleman; and Jazz Jamaica supporting headliner Richard Hawley.

’09 The 2009 festival saw over 20 events held over the 13 days, more than three-quarters of which were educational projects. The event was host to 400 children who took part in an African music exchange project (with the help from Garforth Academy's Partner school: Mzuvele High School, Durban, South Africa), and an Indian wedding ceremony that joined to complete that year's procession. The 2009 festival included: The Breeze international festival; Samay, Jazz trio the Fruit Tree Project, Coal Face, a theatre commission about mining and guitarist, Jon Gomm. A highlight of the festival was Ricky Tomlinson's Laughter Show. The Playground Party saw the 'Second Stage' renamed 'ELFM' Stage which hosted local bands such as, The Koodoos and A Fair Fight. The main stage saw Ukulele Orchestra of Great Britain; Chumbawamba and African Children's Choir support the headline act, punk band Buzzcocks.

’10 2010 saw 16 events take place over 13 days. The festival expanded on the African exchange project through its procession, with a song written by Mzuvele High School. The festival featured acts including: The Mighty Zulu Nation, slam poet Rommi Smith, Art Forms Music Xtra, The Croshaw Family and Serious Sam Barrett, comedian John Hegley and Alasdair Roberts. The Playground Party included a dance project and performance involving over 200 students working with the Phoenix Dance Theatre. The ELFM stage played host to local acts such as Gary Stewart. The main stage saw performances from Oompah Brass; London Community Gospel Choir; Get Cape. Wear Cape. Fly and the 2010 festival headliner Seth Lakeman.

’11 The 2011 festival featured 15 events across the 13 days, including many educational projects. Highlights of the two weeks included: 'Street Dance Spectacular', involving over 200 students; jazz vocalist Nicki Allan; Cabaret Heaven; 'Justice For All', an event working with young actors led by Red Ladder Theatre Company; 'Stories from the Street'; and blues band Mojo 57. The Playground Party hosted two educational projects including over 300 students working with Urban Strawberry Lunch and performing original compositions, and a dance project in conjunction with Phoenix Dance Theatre. The procession featured a collaborated song written by the Mzuvele High School and the Garforth Jazz Rock Band and involved over 400 children. ELFM's stage provided performances from acts such as Bramley Primary School Choir to Tigers That Talked. The main stage saw Salsa Celtica and South African musician Hugh Masekela support the headliner, singer songwriter Billy Bragg.

’12 The festival in 2012 featured 13 days of events, expanding in diversity through its educational projects. Highlights included: Chocolate Story; Camerata Vocal Musica Aurea; a tribute to Paul Simon's Graceland album, with Leeds musician Gary Stewart; Hannah James and Sam Sweeney and Rock 'n' Roll band Louis Louis Louis. The festival also featured an Urban Arts Project, with children learning skills in the arts of Skateboarding and Beat boxing culminating at The Works Skatepark. The Playground Party saw the opening of an indoor arena hosting performances from children working with Phoenix Dance Theatre and Mugenkyo Taiko Drummers. The Playground Party also featured a performance from the Mzuvele High School Choir, travelling from Durban for their first performance in the UK. The main stage saw Shlomo & The Lip Factory and Nitin Sawhney support headliners, The Saw Doctors.

’13 The 2013 festival featured ten events across 13 days. Highlights of the festival included: 'Great Big Paint'; Garforth based folk band Jacobean Ruff; Hayley Gaftarnick; a tribute to The Beatles Please Please Me album, with Rock 'n' Roll band Hot Foot Powder; Simon Lindley and guitarist Eduardo Niebla. The Playground Party hosted three stages including the ELFM Stage and an indoor arena, which saw performances from children working with Zulu Tradition and Phoenix Dance Theatre. The main stage featured performances from Leeds based Love Society and Hope and Social alongside Kate Rusby; Lau; Ruby Turner and 2013 headliners Bellowhead.

’14 The tenth Garforth Arts Festival saw nine events take place across its 13-day programme. Highlights of the fortnight included: Leeds based jazz ensemble Dread Supreme; Kippax Brass; an evening celebrating the music of Joni Mitchell; folk trio Lady Maisery; Eva Quartet from Le Mystère des Voix Bulgares; The Stephen Frost Improv Allstars and The Bad Shepherds. The Playground Party hosted a number of educational projects featuring Rock School UK. The second stage was hosted by Hee Haw sessions and included performances from acts such as Maia and Hunting Bears. The main stage saw performances from Ellen and the Escapades; Vieux Farka Touré; The Skatalites; The Wonder Stuff and headline act, Levellers.

’15 The 2015 festival saw 12 days of events, with a strong emphasis on community projects and artists. The programme featured Garforth Brass; Micklefield Male Voice Choir, My Generation: A celebration of 50 years of The Who; Manasamitra; Borealis Saxophone Quartet and Tom Gee Band. It also included an evening dedicated to Frances Bernstein's story Sing Freedom, featuring songs from Alexander L'Estrange's Zimbe!. The Playground Party hosted various educational projects including a 60-piece Samba band, body percussion workshops and pom pom bombing. The second stage was hosted by Chapel FM and featured performances from artists such as Arcarode. The main stage saw performances from Garforth Jazz Rock Band and Ubunye alongside BBC Big Band featuring Clare Teal; Seth Lakeman; Femi Kuti & The Positive Force and headliners The Brand New Heavies.

== Organisation and sponsorship ==
Garforth Arts Festival was promoted by the School Partnership Trust, a charitable non-profit making organisation and was curated and organised by festival director Dave Evans. Proceeds from the festival were re-invested into the community. Additional funding came from the School Partnership Trust, Arts Council England, arts@leeds and Outer East Area Management Team.
