= Leeds East (disambiguation) =

Leeds East or East Leeds may refer to several things associated with the eastern part of Leeds, a city in England:

- Leeds East (UK Parliament constituency)
- Leeds East Airport
- Leeds East Academy, a school
- East Leeds A.R.L.F.C., a rugby club
- East Leeds Parkway railway station, a name for a proposed railway station
- East Leeds FM, a radio station
