= Sir William Lowther, 1st Baronet, of Little Preston =

English landowner

Sir William Lowther, 1st Baronet (10 July 1707 – 15 June 1788) was an English landowner and curate, of Little Preston, Yorkshire.

The eldest son of Christopher Lowther (d. 1718) and grandson of Sir William Lowther, he went to school in Kirkleatham before entering Trinity College, Cambridge in 1726. Ordained priest in 1734, he became rector of Swillington from 1757 to 1788.

On 31 August 1753, he married Anne Zouch (d. 1759), sister of Thomas Zouch. They had two sons, each of whom married a daughter of John Fane, 9th Earl of Westmorland:

- William Lowther, 1st Earl of Lonsdale (1757–1844)
- Sir John Lowther, 1st Baronet (1759–1844)

In 1754, he bought Alverthorpe Hall from his cousin, Thomas Maude. He inherited the estate of Swillington in 1763, upon the death of his first cousin Sir William Lowther, 2nd Baronet. The following year, on 22 August 1764, he was himself created a baronet.

Baronetage of Great Britain
New title	Baronet (of Little Preston); 1764–1788	Succeeded by William Lowther
