= Thomas Zouch =

English clergyman and antiquary

Thomas Zouch (12 September 1737, Sandal Magna near Wakefield – 17 December 1815, Sandal Magna), was an English clergyman and antiquary, best known as a student of the works and life of Izaak Walton.

== Life ==
Thomas Zouch, who claimed to be related to the noble Zouche family, was a younger son of Charles Zouch (died 27 March 1754), vicar of Sandal Magna, who married, on 14 July 1719, Dorothy (died 17 March 1760), daughter of Gervase Norton of Wakefield. Henry Zouch was his elder brother. His sister Anne married Sir William Lowther, 1st Baronet, of Little Preston.

After his father had given him some elementary classical instruction, Thomas Zouch was sent to the free grammar school of Wakefield, under John Clarke. He was admitted pensioner at Trinity College, Cambridge, on 8 July 1756, under the tutorship of Stephen Whisson, and became scholar of his college on 6 May 1757. He won a Craven scholarship in 1760, and graduated B.A. as third wrangler in 1761. Zouch proceeded M.A. in 1764, and D.D. in 1805.

Zouch remained at Cambridge until 1770. He was ordained deacon in 1761, and gained the members' prize for a Latin essay twice – in 1762 as a middle bachelor, and in 1763 as a senior bachelor. In 1762 he was elected minor fellow of his college, and became major fellow in 1764, sub-lector primus 1765–6, and lector linguæ Latinæ 1768. He was also appointed assistant tutor, at an annual salary of £60, to Thomas Postlethwaite, and in addition took private pupils, among whom was Pepper Arden, baron Alvanley. On 8 February 1768 he delivered in the college chapel a funeral oration in Latin on the death of Robert Smith, the master. The official verses on the accession of George III contained a Latin poem by him; to those on that king's marriage he contributed a Greek poem, and he supplied English verses for the sets on the birth of the Prince of Wales and the peace of Paris, which are quoted with praise in the Monthly Review (xxviii. 27–9, xxix. 43). The Greek verses in four of the university sets which bear the name of Michael Lort are said to have been composed by Zouch. He won the Seatonian prize in 1765 with a poem on the 'Crucifixion.' It was printed in that year, and included in the collections of Musæ Seatonianæ (1772 pp. 223–41, 1787 pp. 223–41, 1808 i. 183–98).

Under the pressure of hard work Zouch's health broke down, and on 12 July 1770 he was instituted, on the presentation of his university, to the rectory of Wycliffe, on the south bank of the River Tees. The patronage was vested in the Roman Catholic family of Constable, and, as they resisted his nomination, it cost him much trouble and expense to establish his right to the living. The church and parsonage are delightfully situated, and the interest of this small parish was heightened in his eyes by its reputed connection with John Wycliffe. Zouch remained in this pleasant position until 1793, and for the first ten years (from 1770 to 1780) took private pupils, three at a time.

Zouch's sister Anne had married Sir William Lowther, rector of Swillington, and the list of Zouch's pupils included Lowther's two nephews, William and John Lowther) and Sir Levett Hanson. In Swillington he found much time for study on his own account, and he acquired a full knowledge of French, Italian, Hebrew, as well as 'a certain portion of Chaldee and Arabic learning.' He thoroughly explored this district of Yorkshire for rare botanical specimens, and became so well known for his zeal in the pursuit that on 15 May 1788, within two months of its first meeting, he was elected a fellow of the Linnean Society. Marmaduke Tunstall, a distinguished antiquary and naturalist, was the squire of the parish.

When Richard Pepper Arden was appointed Master of the Rolls in 1788, Zouch became his chaplain, and in 1791 obtained the position of deputy-commissary of the archdeaconry of Richmond. William Pitt, under obligation to the family of Lowther, wrote to Sir William Lowther in January 1791 that he hoped to procure the living of Catterick for Zouch. Though Pitt did not manage this, in 1793 he secured Zouch the valuable rectory of Scrayingham in the East Riding of Yorkshire, whereupon the benefice of Wycliffe became vacant. By the death of his elder brother, Henry, in 1795, an estate at Sandal Magna came to Zouch, and after the widow's death in 1796 he resided there. Pitt considered him for the mastership of Trinity College in 1798; but William Lort Mansel had better claims for a post which then required a man of exceptional firmness of character. In April 1805 Zouch obtained through Pitt the second prebendal stall in Durham Cathedral. When Edward Vernon (afterwards Vernon-Harcourt) was translated at the close of 1807 from Carlisle to the archbishopric of York, the Duke of Portland offered the vacant see to Zouch. He is said to have accepted the offer, but to have withdrawn his acceptance a day later. Hard of hearing from early life, his deafness had worsened with age, and he was now in bad health. Moreover, the change would have brought little, if any, financial advantage.|

Zouch died at Sandal Magna on 17 December 1815, and was buried there on 23 Dec, the Rev. James Tate drawing up a Latin inscription for him. He had married at Winston, Durham, on 9 July 1772, Isabella, daughter of John Emerson, rector of that parish. She died on 18 October 1803. His second wife, whom he married at Sandal Magna on 25 August 1808, was Margaret (1743–1833), second daughter of Dr. William Brooke of Field Head, Dodworth, Yorkshire, and sister of J. C. Brooke, Somerset herald; she was buried with her husband at Sandal (July 1833). Zouch was a governor of Wakefield school from 14 June 1799 to 13 May 1805, and he founded the endowed school at Sandal.

== Works ==
Thomas Zouch was best known as an editor and biographer of Izaak Walton, though his biography of Walton would be superseded by that of Nicholas Harris Nicolas.

=== Works relating to Walton ===
- (ed.) Love and Truth in two modest and peaceable letters … from a quiet and conformable citizen of London to two busie and factious shopkeepers in Coventry, 1795. Quarto. Reprint of a rare tract dated 1680 in Emmanuel College Library, Cambridge, and ascribed to Izaak Walton. Edited with notes, a preface and a dedication to Henry Zouch.
- (ed.) Izaak Walton, Lives of Donne, Wotton, Hooker, Herbert, and Sanderson, with Notes and Life of the author, York, 1796. Reissued in this country in 1807 and (with inclusion of Love and Truth) in 1817; published at New York in 1846 and 1848, and at Boston in 1860. He was attacked for some of his comments in the 'Monthly Magazine' (May 1803, pp. 299–300), and defended himself in the 'Gentleman's Magazine' (1803, ii. 1016).
- 'Life of Walton', in Samuel Bagster's 1808 issue of Sir John Hawkins's edition of The Compleat Angler.
- Life of Izaak Walton, with notices of his contemporaries. Separately published with illustrations in 1823, and reissued in 1825.

=== Other works ===
- An Inquiry into the Prophetic Character of the Romans, as described in Daniel viii. 23–5, 1792
- An attempt to illustrate some of the Prophecies of the Old and New Testament, [1800]
- (Anon.) A Letter to Bishop Horsley on his Opinion concerning Antichrist. By a Country Clergyman, 1801
- (Anon.) Memoir of John Sudbury, Dean of Durham, 1808.
- Memoirs of the Life and Writings of Sir Philip Sidney, 1808; 2nd ed. 1809.
- Zouch helped to write 'The Life and Character of John, Lord Viscount Lonsdale', printed for private distribution in 1808, and prefixed to the Memoirs of James II, 1808.
- Works, ed. Francis Wrangham, York, 1820. Published both in a private impression of four copies only, and also for sale, 2 vols. 8vo.
