= Henry Zouch =

English antiquary and social reformer

Henry Zouch (c. 1725–1795), was an English antiquary and social reformer.

Zouch was the eldest surviving son of Charles Zouch, vicar of Sandal Magna, near Wakefield, and elder brother of Thomas Zouch. He was educated at Wakefield Grammar School under the Rev. Benjamin Wilson, and was admitted pensioner at Trinity College, Cambridge, on 9 April 1743. He graduated B.A. in 1746 and M.A. in 1750. The set of English verses contributed by him to the Cambridge collection on the peace of 1748 is included in the Works of Thomas Zouch. He translated into Greek a number of the odes of Horace.

Zouch was vicar of his native parish of Sandal Magna from 1754 to 1789. Towards the close of his life the first stone of a new church at Wakefield was laid by him, and from 8 June 1758 to 31 December 1764 he was governor of Wakefield school. In 1788 he succeeded his brother-in-law, Sir William Lowther, in the rectory of Swillington, which he held until his death. He was also rector of Tankersley in Yorkshire, and chaplain to the Marchioness of Rockingham. Long letters of the marquis to him are in the thirteenth report of the historical manuscripts commission.

He was a magistrate of the West Riding. He married Elizabeth, daughter and heiress of William Spinke of Wakefield; she died in the spring of 1796, leaving no issue. He died on 17 June 1795, and on 21 June ‘was buried in his own garden’.

== Works ==
- Remarks upon the late Resolution of the House of Commons respecting the proposed Change of the Poor Laws, [1776]
- (Anon.), English Freeholder's Address to his Countrymen, 1780
- A few Words in Behalf of the Poor, being Remarks upon a Plan of Mr. Gilbert for improving the Police, 1782.
- Account of the present Daring Practices of Night-hunters and Poachers, 1783.
- Hints on the Public Police, 1786.
- Remarks on a Bill of Sir William Young for preventing Vexatious Removals, 1789
