= Allerton Bywater colliery explosion =

Fatal explosion at a colliery in West Yorkshire, England

On Monday 10 March 1930, a mining accident occurred at a colliery in Allerton Bywater, West Yorkshire, England, killing five miners and one pit pony.

== Background ==
The Colliery was owned by Airedale Collieries Ltd. at the time of the explosion, which occurred at 9:30 am in the Old East District of the mine in the Silkstone Seam, 385 yards (352 m) below the surface. Around 150 miners were working in the district, out of 1,000 miners who were in the pit at the time.

== The explosion ==
The seam was 4-foot-9-inch (1.45 m) thick, and colliers drilled shot holes from the roof at 18 inches (460 mm) intervals. These shot holes were charged and fired by a deputy. The day shift deputy, George Paley, had fired eight shots before he reached the working place known as number 8. Each shot used 6 ounces (170 g) of explosive, and Paley had started with 5 pounds (2.3 kg) of explosive in his canister. Paley fired his ninth shot at one side of No.8’s gate without incident. The explosion occurred when Paley fired his tenth shot 6 yards (5.5 m) to the right of the centre of No.8’s gate, five minutes after his ninth shot. A large accumulation of firedamp in explosive proportions had accumulated in the workings at the moment the shot was fired. The resulting explosion was slightly exacerbated by coal dust, which increased the flame of the explosion.

George Paley was killed instantly in the explosion, as was Arthur Richards. Two other men in the No. 8 stall, Albany Taylor and William Townend, were badly burnt. Herbert Taylor and his colleague in 101 gate had fortunately retired from the coal face to take a meal just a minute before the explosion, which likely saved their lives, as they were adjacent to No. 8 Gate. Herbert Taylor reported hearing an enormous explosion, and was immediately plunged into darkness with choking dense fumes, smoke and dust filling the air.

Albany Taylor and William Townend were helped out of the pit by Harold Collinson, aged 19, who had himself been injured. Collinson had been standing in No.7 stall, waiting for John Allan and his pony, who were overdue. Harold Collinson reported a tremendous gust of wind and a report, and was peppered in the back by flying stones. As they escaped the mine, the three injured men passed Harry Collinson, Harold’s father, who had been making his way to see why John Allan was late. Although 40 yards (37 m) further away than his son from the point of the explosion, Harry Collinson had still been knocked back off his feet. Struck by the smell of burning and despite seeing the plight of his son with Townend and Taylor, Harry Collinson continued walking towards the scene of the explosion, as it was his job as pit corporal to investigate. He discovered the broken bodies of John Allan, whom he'd trained since Allan had started working in the mine as a boy, and his pony. Allan had been overtaken by the force of the explosion and hurled against the road side. Collinson couldn’t progress further due to afterdamp, and was forced to leave the mine.

Albany Taylor despite his burns was able to walk out of the mine, whilst William Townend was conveyed on a stretcher, and both men were taken to the Castleford, Normanton and District Hospital. However Albany Taylor died during the night, and William Townend died the following day.

== Inquest ==
At the inquest into the explosion, the jury returned the verdict that the explosion had been the result of methane being ignited by the firing of a shot and that no case of negligence attached to anyone connected. However the inquest did observe that the face had not received thorough treatment with inert dust, as the area around the explosion contained between 45.2% and 71.2% combustible matter within dust samples taken on the following day; and that the three shot dynamo used for firing did not comply with the Explosives in Coal Mines Order and should not have been used.
