= St Mary's Church, Garforth =

Coordinates: 53°47′33.3″N 1°22′43.6″W

St. Mary's Church
- Church of St Mary the Blessed Virgin, Garforth
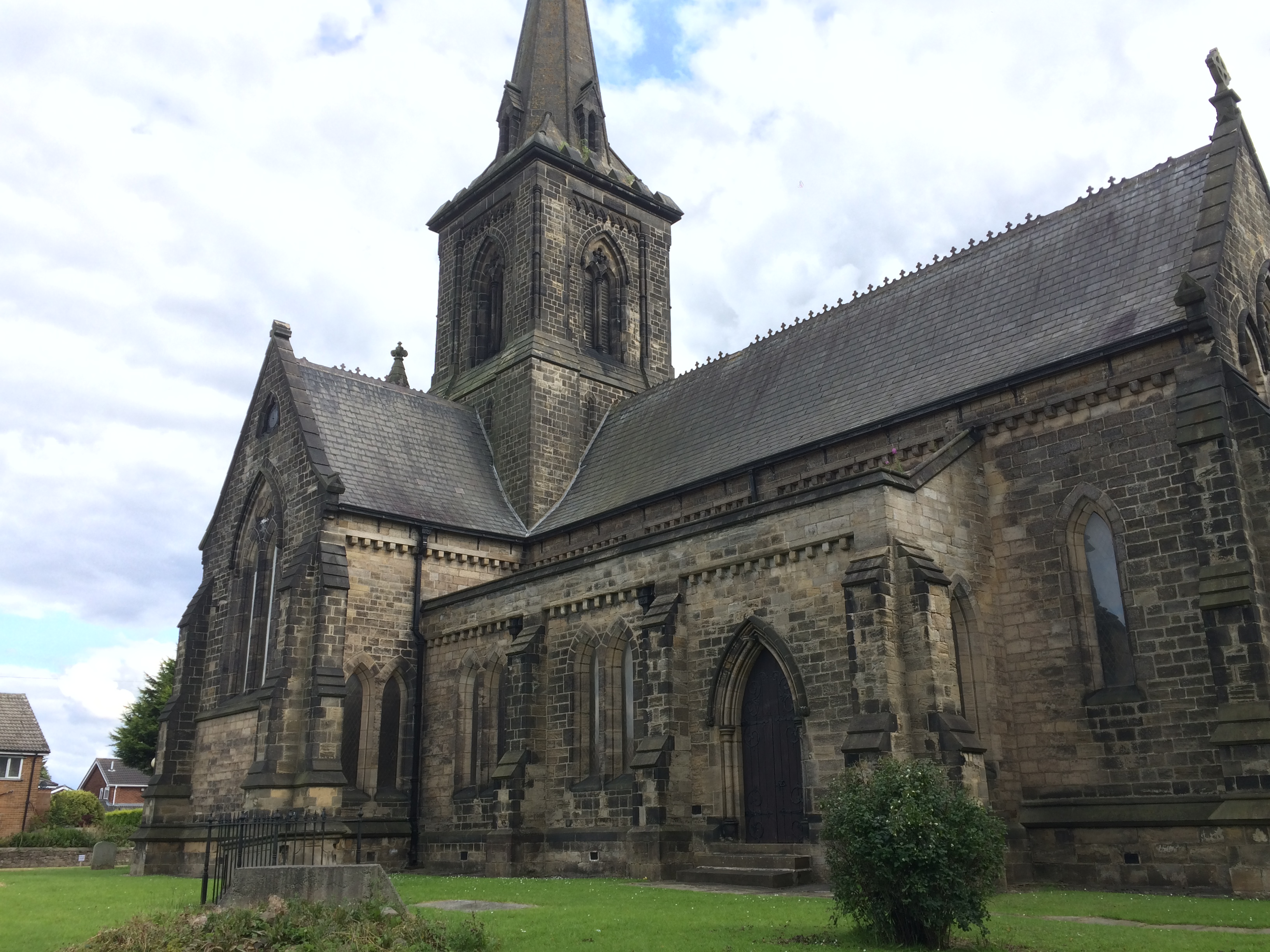
- St. Mary's Church
- OS grid reference: SE 41017 33106
- Location: Garforth, West Yorkshire
- Country: England
- Denomination: Church of England
- Website: http://www.stmarysgarforth.co.uk

History
- Status: Parish Church

Architecture
- Heritage designation: Grade II listed building
- Architect: George Fowler Jones
- Architectural type: Gothic Revival
- Completed: 1844

Specifications
- Materials: Magnesian limestone with red tile and Welsh slate roofs

Administration
- Province: York
- Diocese: Leeds
- Archdeaconry: Leeds
- Parish: Garforth

The Church of St Mary the Blessed Virgin in Garforth, West Yorkshire, England is an active Anglican parish church in the archdeaconry of Leeds and the Diocese of Leeds.

== History ==
The church was built to a design by George Fowler Jones and was completed in 1844.

== Architectural style ==
The church is of dressed magnesian limestone with a slate roof. The church has a cruciform layout with a crossing tower and broach spire. The church has a buttressed three-bay north nave with south aisles. The church has a gabled porch to its south side.

== See also ==
- List of places of worship in the City of Leeds
