= Listed buildings in Garforth and Swillington =

Garforth and Swillington is a ward and Swillington is a civil parish in the metropolitan borough of the City of Leeds, West Yorkshire, England. The ward and parish contain 22 listed buildings that are recorded in the National Heritage List for England. Of these, two are listed at Grade II*, the middle of the three grades, and the others are at Grade II, the lowest grade. The area covered by the list includes the town of Garforth, the village of Swillington, and the surrounding countryside. The listed buildings include houses and associated structures, farmhouses, churches, a sundial in a churchyard, road and railway bridges, and mileposts.

== Key ==
Grade	Criteria
II*	Particularly important buildings of more than special interest
II	Buildings of national importance and special interest

== Buildings ==
Name and location	Photograph	Date	Notes	Grade
St Mary's Church, Swillington; 53.76919°N 1.41753°W		Late 14th or early 15th century	The church was restored in about 1860, and the tower was refaced in gritstone in 1884. The rest of the church is in magnesian limestone, and it consists of a nave with a clerestory, north and south aisles, a chancel with a north vestry, and a west tower. The tower is in Perpendicular style, and the aisles and chancel are Decorated. The tower has three stages, diagonal buttresses, a west doorway with a moulded surround and a crocketed hood mould, a three-light window and a re-set medieval niche above, two-light bell windows, a corbel table, and an embattled parapet with crocketed corner pinnacles.	II*
Lawn Farmhouse; 53.77062°N 1.44561°W	—	Early 18th century	The farmhouse is in rendered brick with a stone slate roof. There are two storeys and seven bays. The doorway has a plain surround and a fanlight, and the windows are sashes.	II
Sundial; 53.76903°N 1.41739°W	—	Early 18th century (probable)	The sundial is in the churchyard of St Mary's Church, Swillington, and is in stone. It consists of a base of three circular steps, a vase pedestal, and a brass plate and gnomon.	II
Smeaton House Farmhouse and walls 53.77472°N 1.42163°W	—	18th century	The farmhouse is in brick with a hipped stone slate roof. There are two storeys, a symmetrical front of five bays, and a single-storey rear wing. Steps lead up to a central doorway that has a moulded architrave, and a three-light fanlight. The windows are sashes, those in the ground floor with cambered heads. On each side is a screen wall, the right wall with a doorway and the left with a ramp.	II
Gazebo in the garden of The Orchards; 53.76398°N 1.43877°W	—	18th century	The gazebo is in painted brick and has an eaves cornice with a saw-toothed band, and a pyramidal stone slate roof with an apex pedestal. There are two unequal storeys and a basement, and a square plan. The two doorways have plain surrounds, the main doorway is approached by a flight of semicircular steps. There is a sash window and a blocked window.	II
Leventhorpe Hall; 53.76542°N 1.44199°W	—	1774	A country house designed by John Carr, it is in stone, the side walls rendered, with bands, a modillion eaves cornice, and a hipped roof. There are two storeys and a symmetrical front of seven bays, the middle three bays on the front projecting and canted. Steps with iron railings lead up to the central doorway that has a moulded architrave on consoles. The windows are sashes with moulded architraves, those in the ground floor with moulded cornices, and those in the upper floor with balustraded aprons. At the rear, the outer three bays at each end are canted, and in the centre are two French windows.	II*
Gate piers 53.76614°N 1.43750°W		Late 18th century (probable)	Flanking the entrance to the drive to Leventhorpe Hall are six gate piers. They are in stuccoed stone, with a square section, and are about 3 metres (9.8 ft) high. Each pier has a band near the top and panelled sides above this, a moulded cornice, and a finial consisting of a ball in a square band.	II
Newsam Green Farmhouse; 53.77127°N 1.44495°W	—	Late 18th century	The farmhouse is in rendered brick with paired gutter brackets and a stone slate roof. There are two storeys and four bays. The doorway has a fanlight, and the windows are sashes.	II
Swillington Bridge; 53.76003°N 1.43627°W		Late 18th or early 19th century	The bridge carries Aberford Road (A642 road) over the River Aire. It is in magnesian limestone, and consists of two segmental arches. The bridge has bands, a triangular cutwater, and a replaced parapet.	II
Bridge Farmhouse; 53.76070°N 1.43552°W		Early 19th century	A farmhouse, later a hotel, it incorporates earlier material, and is in sandstone, with a floor band, and a hipped slate roof. There are two storeys, an L-shaped plan, and a double-depth front range with a symmetrical front of three bays. In the centre is a giant shallow round-headed recess containing a doorway with a fanlight. The windows are sashes.	II
Ice house, former Swillington House; 53.76073°N 1.42915°W	—	Early 19th century	The ice house is in brick in a mound of earth. It consists of an egg-shaped vessel half-buried in earth, and is approached by a brick-vaulted passage on the north side.	II
Stables, former Swillington House; 53.75962°N 1.42554°W	—	Early 19th century	There are two stable blocks at right angles, later converted for residential use, in sandstone with projecting eaves, hipped slate roofs, and two storeys. The main range has 13 bays and the other range has twelve. They contain giant pilasters with segmental arches between them, and corner pilasters. Most of the windows have segmental heads and contain sashes.	II
South lodge, Swillington Park; 53.76045°N 1.43501°W	—	Early 19th century	The gate lodge to the former Swillington House is in sandstone, with a frieze, a moulded cornice, and a high parapet. There is one storey, and at the southwest corner are three columns forming a porch. The fronts facing the drive and the road contain bay windows with pilasters and containing sashes.	II
Aberford Road Bridge; 53.79685°N 1.38301°W		1830–34	The bridge was built by the Leeds and Selby Railway to carry Aberford Road (A642 road) over its line as it passes through Garforth railway station. It is in limestone and sandstone, and consists of a single skew basket arch. The arch springs from an impost band, and has stepped and rusticated voussoirs, a string course, coped parapets, and straight wing walls.	II
Barwick Road Bridge; 53.79828°N 1.38892°W		c. 1834	The bridge was built by the Leeds and Selby Railway to carry its line over Barwick Road. It is in red brick with sandstone dressings, and consists of a single elliptical arch. The bridge has rusticated quoins, impost bands, voussoirs, a band, a parapet with rounded coping, and splayed ends finishing as pilasters.	II
St Mary's Church, Garforth; 53.79268°N 1.37889°W		1844–45	The church is in magnesian limestone with a slate roof, and in Early English style. It has a cruciform plan, consisting of a nave, north and south aisles, a south porch, north and south transepts, a chancel, and a steeple at the crossing. The steeple has a tower with a Lombard frieze, two-light bell windows with hood moulds, a clock face, a moulded cornice, and an octagonal broach spire with lucarnes. Most of the windows are lancets, and at the east and west ends are tripled stepped lancets.	II
Dovecote and outbuilding, Gamblethorpe Farm; 53.76898°N 1.43263°W	—	Mid 19th century (probable)	The dovecote and attached stable and outbuilding are in sandstone, with an impost band, and a stone slate roof. The dovecote in the middle has two storeys, a pyramidal roof, and three bays, and the flanking wings have one storey, hipped roofs, and each has three bays. In each part is a central round-arched doorway flanked by round-headed windows, and in the upper storey of the dovecote is a round-arched blind window on each front and a sill band.	II
Milepost at SE 394 329; 53.79082°N 1.40280°W		Mid 19th century (probable)	The milestone is on the southeast side of Wakefield Road (A642 road). It is in stone with cast iron overlay, and has a triangular section and a rounded top. On the top is "WAKEFIELD & ABERFORD ROAD" and "GARFORTH", and on the sides are the distances to Wakefield, Aberford and Oulton.	II
Milepost at SE 410 320; 53.78303°N 1.37845°W		Mid 19th century (probable)	The milestone is on the south side of Selby Road (A63 road). It is in stone with cast iron overlay, and has a triangular section and a rounded top. On the top is "SELBY AND LEEDS" and "TURNPIKE ROAD", and on the sides are the distances to Leeds and Selby.	II
Milepost at SE 381 300; 53.76556°N 1.42326°W	—	Mid 19th century (probable)	The milestone is on the southeast side of Wakefield Road (A642 road). It is in stone with cast iron overlay, and has a triangular section and a rounded top. On the top is "WAKEFIELD & ABERFORD ROAD" and "SWILLINGTON", and on the sides are the distances to Wakefield, Aberford and Oulton.	II
Leventhorpe Cottages; 53.76459°N 1.43954°W	—	1856	Originally the stables to the hall, later divided for residential use. The building is in magnesian limestone with a slate roof, a single storey, and a U-shaped plan, with a screen wall enclosing the courtyard, and a wing at the northeast corner. The entrance has a semicircular arch with impost bands, a keystone carved with a horse's head, and cresting on the apex. The wings have pedimented gables containing round windows, and a segmental-headed wagon entry. In the centre of the rear range is a three-stage bell tower with an achievement of arms, above which is a clock face, and at the top is an octagonal bellcote with a cornice, a cupola, and an ornamental weathervane.	II
Lodge, Leventhorpe Hall; 53.76601°N 1.43763°W		c. 1860	The gate lodge at the entrance to the drive is in sandstone, with projecting bracketed eaves, and a slate roof. There is one storey, and an L-shaped plan, with a gable facing the road and another facing the drive. In the angle is a flat-roofed stone porch, and the windows are sashes with moulded architraves and projecting sills on brackets.	II
