= John Birch (rugby league) =

Former GB & England international rugby league footballer

Personal information
- Full name: John Wilkinson Birch
- Born: 1 June 1878 Garforth, West Riding of Yorkshire, England
- Died: 10 October 1953 (aged 75) Barwick-in-Elmet, West Riding of Yorkshire, England

Playing information
- Height: 5 ft 11.5 in (1.816 m)
- Weight: 13 st 0 lb (83 kg)
- Position: Forward
Club
Years	Team	Pld	T	G	FG	P
1897–1901	Leeds Parish Church
1901–09	Leeds	232	26	1		80
1913–1915	Castleford
	Total	232	26	1	0	80
Representative
Years	Team	Pld	T	G	FG	P
1908	England	1	1	0	0	3
1908	Great Britain	1	0	0	0	0

John Wilkinson Birch (1 June 1878 – 10 October 1953) was an English professional rugby league footballer who played in the 1890s and 1900s. He played at representative level for Great Britain and England, and at club level for Leeds Parish Church and Leeds, as a forward.

Birch was born on 1 June 1878 and baptised on Christmas Day 1878 at St Mary's church Garforth, Leeds. His father was George Birch of Barrowby Lane who was a very large man weighing around 24 stone and also a very well known character of Garforth, known to the villagers as Scribbin Birch. His mother was Alice Ellen Smith of Garforth he married Annie Simpson of Kippax in 1898.

== Playing career ==
Birch played for the Leeds Parish Church rugby team he was in the team when they played their last ever match on Wednesday 24 April 1901. He scored a Try against York with the Parish Church winning 21–2. The club was disbanded when the lease on its Clarence Road ground expired. When Leeds Parish Church disbanded in 1901, the Church Committee placed the whole of their playing staff at the disposal of the Leeds Club who let in John Wilkinson Birch and seven of his colleagues: W. Cororan, C. Crumpton, W. Evans, S. Herberts, G. Hewlett, J. McNicholas, and George Mosley. John Wilkinson Birch made his début against Wakefield Trinity at Headingley on 7 September 1901 running out winners 16–9. Many of the players in his team of 1901 are still revered at Headingley today.

== International honours ==
Birch won a cap for England while at Leeds in 1908 against Wales, and won a cap for Great Britain while at Leeds in 1908 against New Zealand.

=== Leeds v The Rest 1902 ===
When Leeds won the Yorkshire Senior Competition in 1901/02 Leeds proved themselves true Champions with victory over The Rest a team made up of the best players from rival clubs the result been 7–5 on 19 April 1902 at Headingley. The team that day was; Dean, Evans, Littlewood, Davies, Mudd, George Mosley (another ex-Leeds Parish Church), Grace, Hewlett, John Wilkinson Birch, Crumpton, McNicholas, Taylor, Crowther, Hanson, Midgley.

=== Leeds v New Zealand 1907 ===
The Leeds team took on New Zealand on 26 October 1907 at Headingley during their pioneering 1907–08 tour of Great Britain. The game was kicked off by Birch in heavy rain making the ground treacherous underfoot the game ended up a win for the tourists 8–2, the team that day was; Young, Scamans, Fawcett, Thomas, Llewellyn, Ward, Wilson, John Wilkinson Birch, Burnley, Harrison, Stead, Wainwright, Webster.

==== Northern union/Great Britain v New Zealand 1908 ====
Birch once again met the New Zealand in the third test match on Saturday 13 February 1908 at the Athletic Ground, Cheltenham when he won a cap for Great Britain while playing for his club team Leeds, the game was won by New Zealand 8–5 and the famous encounter would become known as the Great Match of the Edwardian Period. The Great Britain team that day was; H. Taylor, W. Batten, B. Jenkins, P. Thomas, G. Tyson, T. White, J. Jolley, A. Smith, J. L. Clampitt, John Wilkinson Birch, J. Spencer, W. Holder.

== Retirement ==
Birch retired in 1909. His final game was against Hunslet in the 2nd round of the Northern Union Cup. He broke his collarbone within the first 10 minutes of the cup tie but kept on playing. The match was played in front of 22,000 spectators. Hunslet opted to play their biggest six forwards, leaving out Smales and Davies. The Leeds front rank being entirely worn down by the "Terrible Six" before the end of the game. The result was Hunslet 15 against Leeds 9. The Leeds team that day was; F. Young, G. Desborough, F. Oliver, F. Ware, W. Goldthorpe, J. Fawcett, R. Ward, R. Jones, F. Webster, F. Harrison, S. Whitaker, J. Townend, T.H. Wainwright, W. Jarman, J.W. Birch, and E. Hughes.

== Death ==
He died on 10 October 1953 (aged 75) at St James's Hospital, Leeds. He was buried on 14 October 1953 at All Saints Church Barwick in Elmet.
