= Red Ladder Theatre Company =

Touring theater company

Red Ladder Theatre Company is a national touring theatre company, funded by the Arts Council England and Leeds City Council. It is based at the Yorkshire Dance Centre, Leeds.

The company was founded in London in 1968, during the Vietnam War, as a radical socialist theatre known as agitprop. The company moved to Leeds in the 1970s and is still based in the city. During the 1980s, the company changed its co-operative structure to a hierarchy and became a company that specialised in targeted work for youth audiences.

Red Ladder also hosted the Asian Theatre School, later Freedom Studios, preparing productions including the play Silent Cry by Madani Younis presented at the Theatre Royal, York (2004).

In 2011, it ran a play called Promised Land, an adaptation of Anthony Clavane's book about Leeds United.

Today the company:

- tours nationally
- produces performance for the Annual Emerge Festival and Garforth Arts Festival
- Runs the Red Grit, Actor Training programme

Red Ladder's Arts Council funding will cease from April 2015. In response to a fundraising campaign to save the company, author David Peace has donated the theatre rights to his novel The Damned Utd.
