= St Aidan's =

Nature reserve in West Yorkshire, England

RSPB St Aidan's
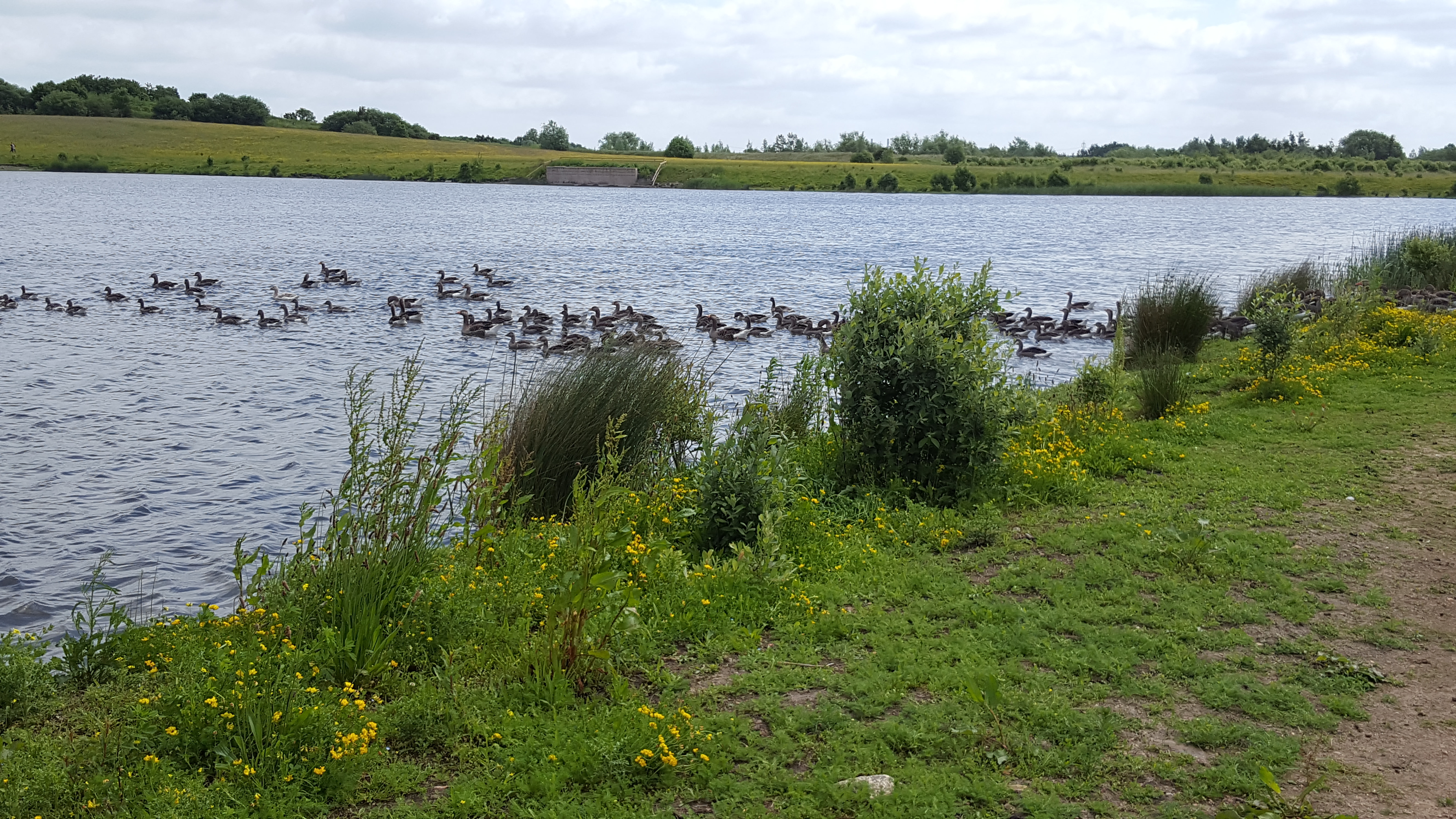
- St Aidan's Nature Reserve
- Interactive map of RSPB St Aidan's
- Location: West Yorkshire, England
- Coordinates: 53.749015°N 1.408653°W
- Established: 2013
- Operator: Royal Society for the Protection of Birds

St Aidan's is a 355-hectare (880-acre) nature park located between Leeds and Castleford in West Yorkshire, England. The land was formerly an opencast coal mining area that was flooded in 1988, after the riverbank collapsed. Repairs and remediation required their own Act of Parliament to allow the necessary works to go ahead. Mining ceased at St Aidan's in 2002.

The nature park opened to the public in May 2013 under the care of the Royal Society for the Protection of Birds (RSPB). However, the car park and visitor centre were subsequently closed in July 2013 due to unresolved land issues. With the successful transfer of St Aidan's to Leeds City Council, a 99-year lease was signed from the council to the RSPB in March 2017. The site is now open and functioning as an RSPB nature park. It is open every day excluding Christmas Day with the visitor centre open from 9.30 am to 5 pm February – October and 9.30 am to 4 pm November – January.

RSPB St Aidan's Nature Park is designed for both people and wildlife and is open for a wide range of activities, from bird watching, cycling and walking to jogging, horse riding and dog walking.

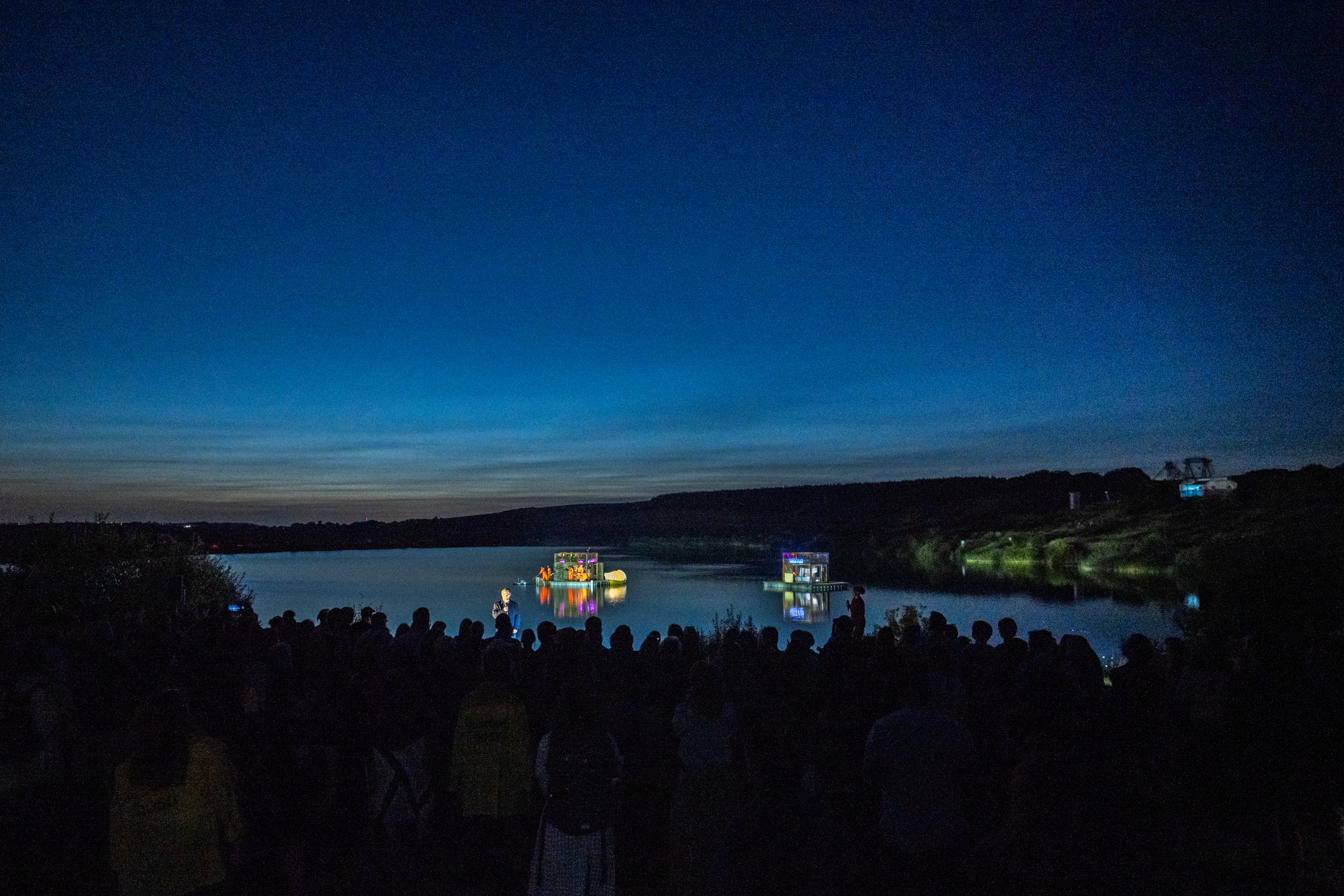
Floating stages lit up on lake, silhouettes of audience. Nest (play). LEEDS 2023

In 2023, it was the location of a site-specific performance by the National Youth Theatre, entitled Nest, part of Leeds 2023.

== History ==
St Aidan's nature park comprises the former St Aidan's opencast site, Lowther North opencast site and parts of the former Savile Colliery, Methley. In March 1988, there was a slope failure on the banks of the River Aire, resulting in a massive flood of 17,000,000 L (3,700,000 imp gal; 4,500,000 US gal) of water. RAF Chinook helicopters were used to ferry stone and sandbags into the breach, but it did not stop the water cascading in. It took four days for the floodwater to fill the mine workings. Not only did the downstream river flow into the site, but the River Calder actually flowed upstream in the River Aire waterbed from Castleford until the water found a natural level. The failure came about just southeast of Lemonroyd Lock where the Aire and Calder Navigation joins the River Aire. The resultant deluge created a lake that was 100 ha (250 acres) in size and 70 m (230 ft) deep.

Mining operations were suspended and remedial works costing £20 million were required to drain the site and re-route the river. Mining resumed after ten years was subsequently completed. The site was then converted into a wetland reserve.

The Pontefract and District Archaeological Society won the Pitt Rivers award for their work on the preservation of the ships and heritage that was found in the abandoned river bed after the water was diverted. The find provided a unique insight into river trade in the seventeenth century onwards, including the hulls of four boats (virtually intact), various pottery and evidence of a medieval weir.

Ownership of the land was transferred in 2010 from UK Coal/Harworth Estates to St Aidan's Trust, a charity administered by Leeds City Council. The trust would then lease the land to the RSPB for 99 years on a peppercorn rent. The Country Park officially opened to the public on 25 May 2013. Unfortunately, due to unresolved land ownership issues, the RSPB withdrew its staffing and support in July 2013.

As of 21 December 2016, ownership of St Aidan's was successfully passed from Harworth Estates to the St Aidan's Trust (of which Leeds City Council is the sole trustee). The site was then leased to the RSPB on a 99-year lease and reopened in April 2017. The RSPB now have control of the management of the site.

== Location ==
St Aidan's is adjacent to the River Aire and the Aire and Calder Navigation. The nature park can be accessed via a network of paths, some of which run alongside the River Aire. It is approximately 2 miles from Woodlesford railway station. Nearby are the residential areas of Allerton Bywater, Mickletown, Methley, Woodlesford, Swillington, Great Preston and Kippax all of which lie within an area bounded by three motorways: A1(M), M62 and M1.

== Wildlife ==
The main trails at St Aidan's pass through a variety of habitats including reedbed, wetland, meadows and woodland. St Aidan's is home to many species of bird including the Eurasian bittern, little owl, western marsh harrier, and Eurasian skylark. Breeding birds on the site include one of the rarest in the UK, black-necked grebe with around 25% of the national population which nest, for protection, near the one-thousand pairs of black-headed gull. Northern lapwing and common redshank also breed.

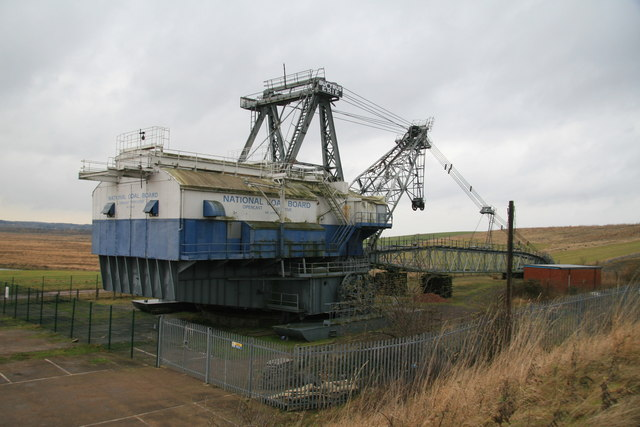
"Oddball", near Swillington

== Dragline ==
There is a giant and unique "walking" dragline known as Oddball at St Aidan's. The name refers to it having been built in the US to run on a 60 Hz electrical supply rather than the UK standard 50 Hz. Originally christened Clinchfield, it was brought to the UK from the US in 1954, when it was the second-largest such machine in the world, weighing 1,220 long tons (1,240 t). It moved to St Aidan's in 1974 and was used to mine surface coal from the area now occupied by the Nature Park.

Its maximum speed was 0.3 kilometres per hour (0.19 mph), in steps of 2 metres (6.6 ft) at a time. It last moved in 1999, when it was positioned on top of the hill overlooking the reserve, for preservation. The group Friends of St Aidan's BE1150 Dragline claims that it is the largest preserved walking dragline excavator in Western Europe. The group holds open days throughout the year where visitors can look around the machine and sit in the cab.
