= Jon Gomm =

English fingerstyle guitarist (born 1977)

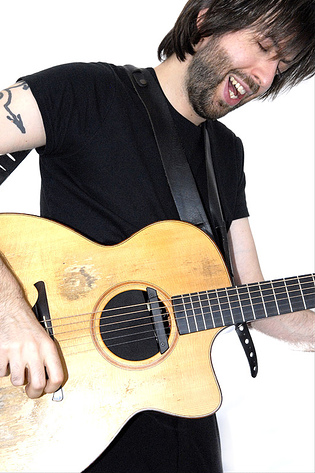
- Jon Gomm by Danny North, 2006

Background information
- Born: Blackpool, Lancashire, England
- Occupations: musician, songwriter
- Instruments: guitar, vocals, ukulele
- Years active: 2004–present
- Website: Jongomm.com

Jon Gomm (born 11 July 1977) is an English singer-songwriter and performer. He employs percussive techniques on acoustic guitar, and his influences include genres such as blues, soul, rock and metal and the musician Michael Hedges. He has recorded three solo albums.

== Biography ==
Jon Gomm started playing ukulele at the age of two. He began classical guitar lessons at the age of four, and at twelve, he would accompany his father, a music critic, to blues gigs in his hometown of Blackpool. As a teenager, he played electric guitar.

On leaving school, Gomm turned down a place at Oxford University studying English to attend the Guitar Institute (now part of the Institute of Contemporary Music Performance) in London. While there, he paid his way through college playing jazz in café bars, recording as a session guitarist, and playing Country music in working men's clubs for line dancers. He moved to Leeds to study in the Jazz degree course at Leeds College of Music.

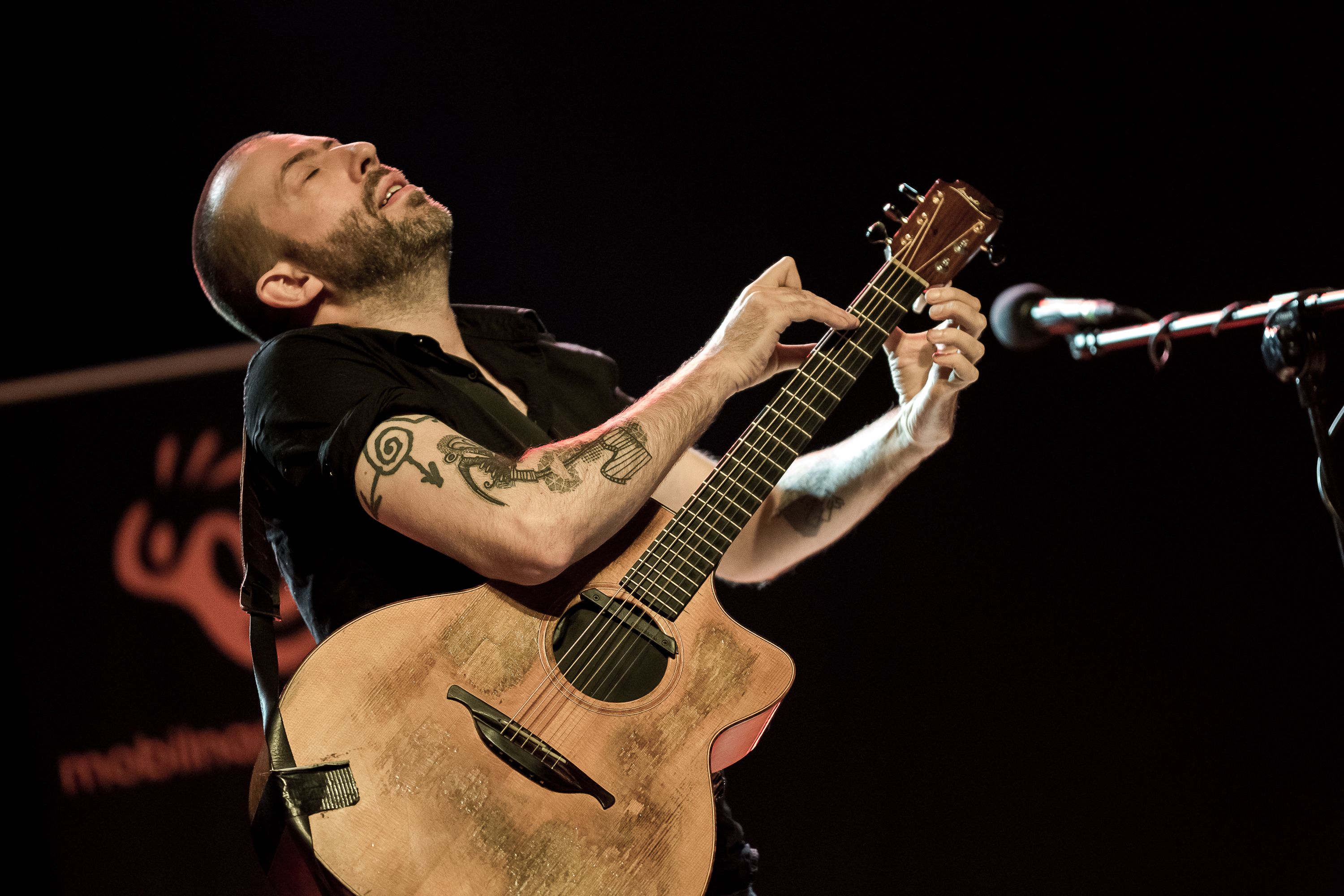
Jon Gomm (Picture: Marek Zawrotny)

He began solo performances in Leeds. He developed a percussive style – hitting the surface of his guitar to make snare drum, bass drum and bongo sounds, re-tuning the strings to get bass sounds, and using high harmonics from the guitar for synthesizer-like effects.

Jon Gomm avoids playing chain venues and corporate festivals. His appearances are generally organised with independent promoters in venues like ale pubs in rural areas, theatres or arts centres. He is a regular performer at the Junction Inn, Otley.

Gomm has also performed with Tommy Emmanuel, Nick Harper, Matt Stevens, and Bob Brozman.

Gomm has performed at festivals including Download, Electric Picnic, the Canadian Guitar Festival, the Italian National Guitar Festival, the Garforth Arts Festival and the London Guitar Show at Wembley Arena. He performs regularly across the UK and has toured in China, Brazil, South Africa, Turkey, Australia and Canada.

In February 2012, a video of him performing his song "Passionflower" was the subject of a tweet from the broadcaster Stephen Fry. This led to him appearing on several television shows and being booked for gigs and tours around the world during 2012.

In November 2013, the album Secrets Nobody Keeps was released after being entirely crowd funded in four weeks in a PledgeMusic campaign. In 2021 the album was reissued on CD with an updated version of "Passionflower" as a bonus track. In 2023 "Passionflower" achieved 6th place for the "50 Greatest Acoustic Songs Of All Time" in Total Guitar.

On 12 August 2020, Gomm released "Cocoon”, his first single in seven years, from his album The Faintest Idea.

== Discography ==
=== Studio albums ===
- Hypertension (2003) – released on Gomm's own label. All tracks are single takes with no overdubs.
- Don't Panic (2009)
- Secrets Nobody Keeps (2013)
- The Faintest Idea (2020)
- Secrets Nobody Keeps – Passionflower 10th anniversary edition (2021)

=== Singles ===
- "Passionflower" – released in 2011 on Gomm's website
- "Message in a Bottle" – originally by The Police, released in 2011 on Gomm's website
- "Ain't Nobody" – originally by Chaka Khan, released in 2011 on Gomm's website
- "Cocoon" – released in 2020

== Videography ==
- Passionflower (2011)
- Message in a Bottle (The Police cover, 2011)
- Ain't Nobody (Chaka Khan cover, 2012)
- Ain't Nobody (Chaka Khan cover, featuring Daniel Tompkins, 2013)

== Press ==
Referring to Jon Gomm, comedian Stephen Fry posted the one word tweet "wow" in February 2012.

Sandman Magazine wrote "how on earth can one man play so proficiently a "one man band" style that puts full bands to shame?"

Leedsmusicscene.net wrote "Leeds should feel very lucky to have such a performer to call its own."
