= Michael Lort =

Welsh clergyman, academic and antiquary

Michael Lort (1725–1790) was a Welsh clergyman, academic and antiquary.

== Life ==
The descendant of a Pembrokeshire family living at Prickeston, he was eldest son of Roger Lort, major of the Royal Welsh Fusiliers, who married Anne, only child of Edward Jenkins, vicar of Fareham, Hampshire. His father died at Cambrai, 11 May 1745, aged 51, from wounds received at the battle of Fontenoy; his mother died in 1767, aged 69, and in 1778 he erected a monument to their memory, now on the east wall of the chapel of St. Ann in Tenby Church.

He entered Trinity College, Cambridge, on 13 June 1743, when he was described as aged 18 and as coming from Tenby school. William Cole adds that he was at Westminster School. His degrees at Cambridge were, B.A. 1746, M.A. 1750, B.D. 1761, and D.D. 1780. He was incorporated at Oxford 7 July 1759. His college offices were: scholar 20 April 1744, sub-fellow 2 Oct. 1749, full fellow 4 July 1750, senior fellow 1768, sublector primus 1753, Latin reader 1754, lector primarius 1755, and Greek reader 1756. On graduating in 1746, Lort acted as librarian to Richard Mead until 1754.

His preferments were numerous, but for many years not very lucrative. From 1759 to 1771 he held the post of Regius Professor of Greek at Cambridge, and in 1768 he applied for the professorship of modern history, when Thomas Gray was given the chair. In 1761 he was appointed chaplain to Richard Terrick, bishop of Peterborough, and about that date he served the vicarage of Bottisham, near Cambridge. From 1779 to 1783 he lived at Lambeth Palace as domestic chaplain to Archbishop Frederick Cornwallis. He was promoted to be librarian at Lambeth in 1785, and he is said to have been librarian to the Duke of Devonshire. In January 1771 he became rector of St. Matthew, Friday Street, London. On 11 April 1780 he was collated to the prebendal stall of Tottenhall in St. Paul's Cathedral (which caused him to vacate his fellowship at Trinity College on Lady day 1781); he obtained in 1789 the rectory of St. Michael, Mile End, adjoining Colchester; and Bishop Beilby Porteus gave him in April 1789 the sinecure rectory of Fulham.

Lort was elected Fellow of the Society of Antiquaries in 1755, remaining a vice-president until 1788, and became Fellow of the Royal Society in 1766. While driving down North Hill, Colchester, in August 1790, Lort was thrown out of his carriage, and he died from the effects of the accident at 6 Savile Row, London, 5 November 1790. He had married, in May 1783, Susannah Norfolk one of the two daughters of Alderman Norfolk of Cambridge. She died on 5 February 1792, aged 50, and was buried in the same vault with her husband in the church of Friday Street, a white marble tablet being placed on its north wall. On the demolition of the building the remains were removed in 1883 to the City of London cemetery at Ilford.

== Works ==
He published little, but helped others. He printed a couple of sermons (1760 and 1770), edited in 1769 A Projecte conteyning the State of Governmente of the University of Cambridge, in the 43d year of the raigne of Queen Elizabeth, in 1785 had ‘a copy of the Alexandrian New Testament printed off on fine vellum,’ and in 1790 published A Short Commentary on the Lord's Prayer, from which Granville Sharp in 1806 took the observations on the last two petitions as an appendix to his own work on that subject. John Carter the architect obtained his ‘first insight and encouragement’ from him.

Some of his manuscript lives were used by Alexander Chalmers in his Biographical Dictionary. James Granger obtained his aid in his portrait-dictionary, he assisted John Nichols in the Gentleman's Magazine and in other undertakings, and he contributed to Archæologia. Letters to and from him and Cole, Thomas Percy, and Horace Walpole are in Nichols's Literary Anecdotes, and Illustrations of Literary History, and there are some letters and notes from him in Granger's Letters.

Lort's English verses from the Gratulatio Academiæ Cantabrigiensis, 1748, on the peace of Aix-la-Chapelle, are reprinted in Nichols's Collection of Poems, and another English poem by him is in Thomas Zouch's Works. The Greek verses in four collections of the University of Cambridge (1760–63) which bear Lort's name are reprinted in Zouch's Works (by whom it appears that they were written). His notes on the authorship of the Whole Duty of Man are in Nichols's Literary Anecdotes, and his vindication of Horace Walpole with respect to Thomas Chatterton is in the Illustrations of Literary History.

His books were sold from 5 April to 14 May 1791, and produced £1,269, and his prints, which were disposed of on 26 May and six following days, fetched £401.

== Notes ==
Attribution

This article incorporates text from a publication now in the public domain: "Lort, Michael". Dictionary of National Biography. London: Smith, Elder & Co. 1885–1900.
