= Garforth =

Town in West Yorkshire, England

Coordinates: 53.792°N 1.388°W

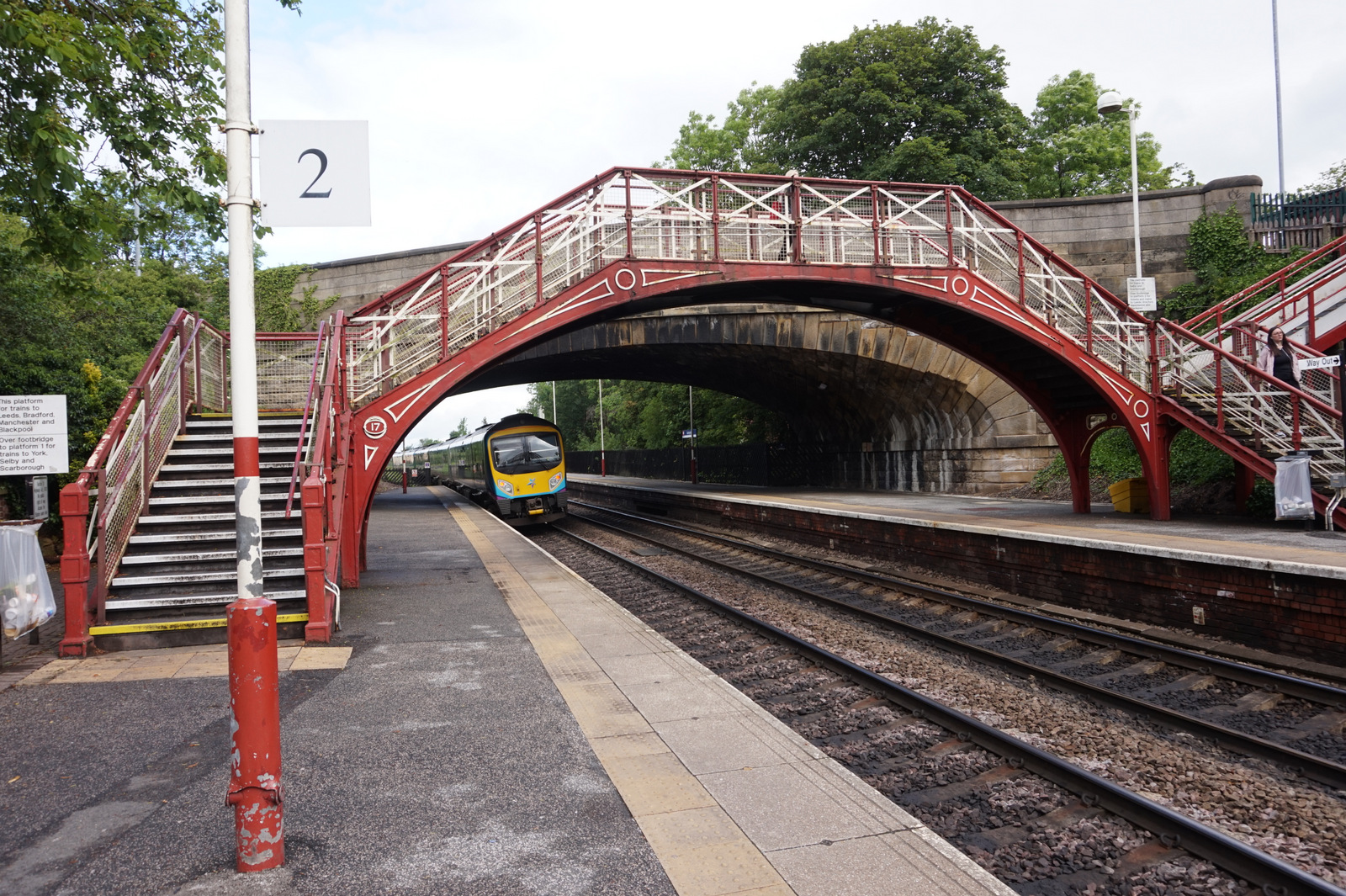
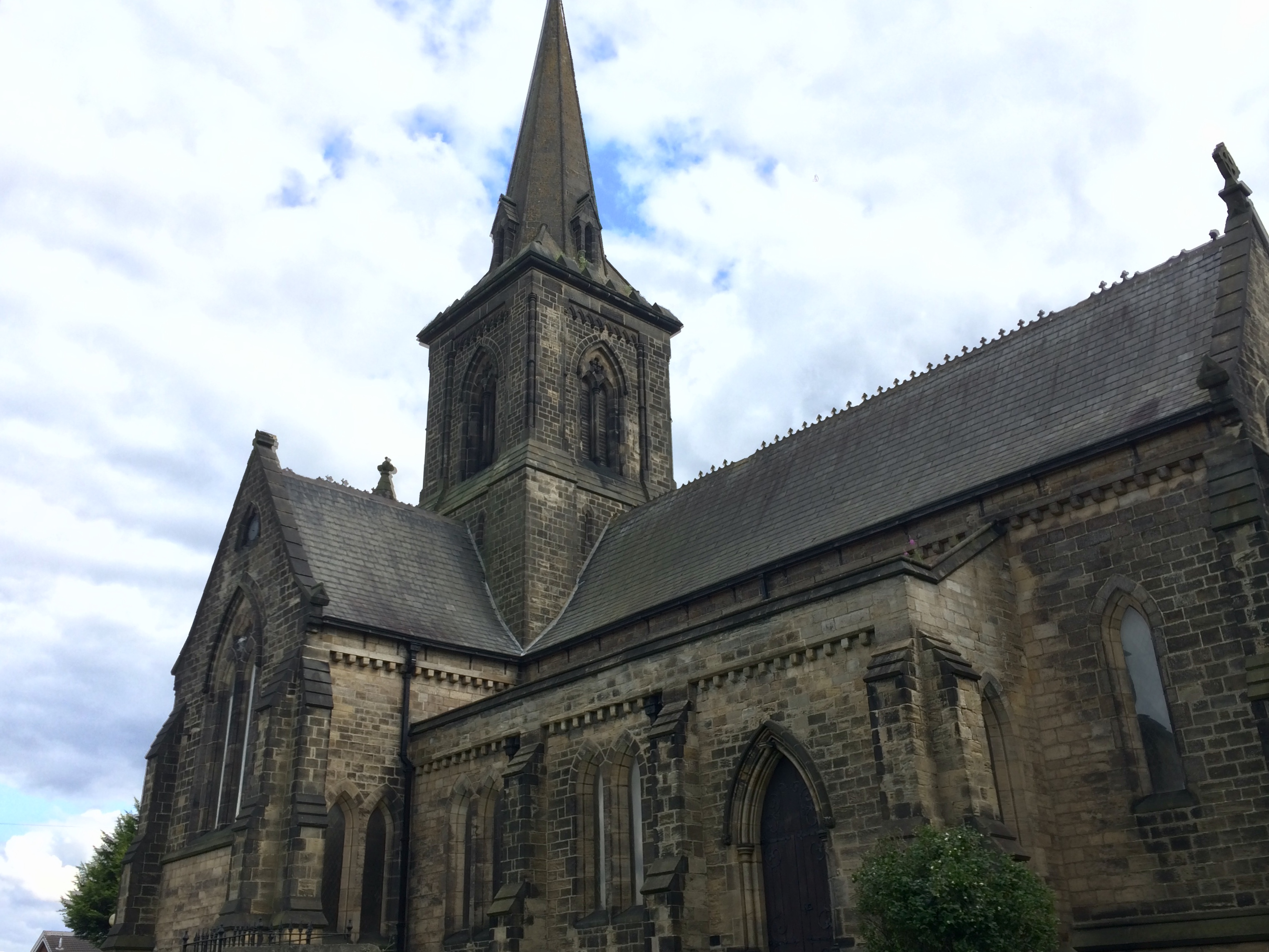
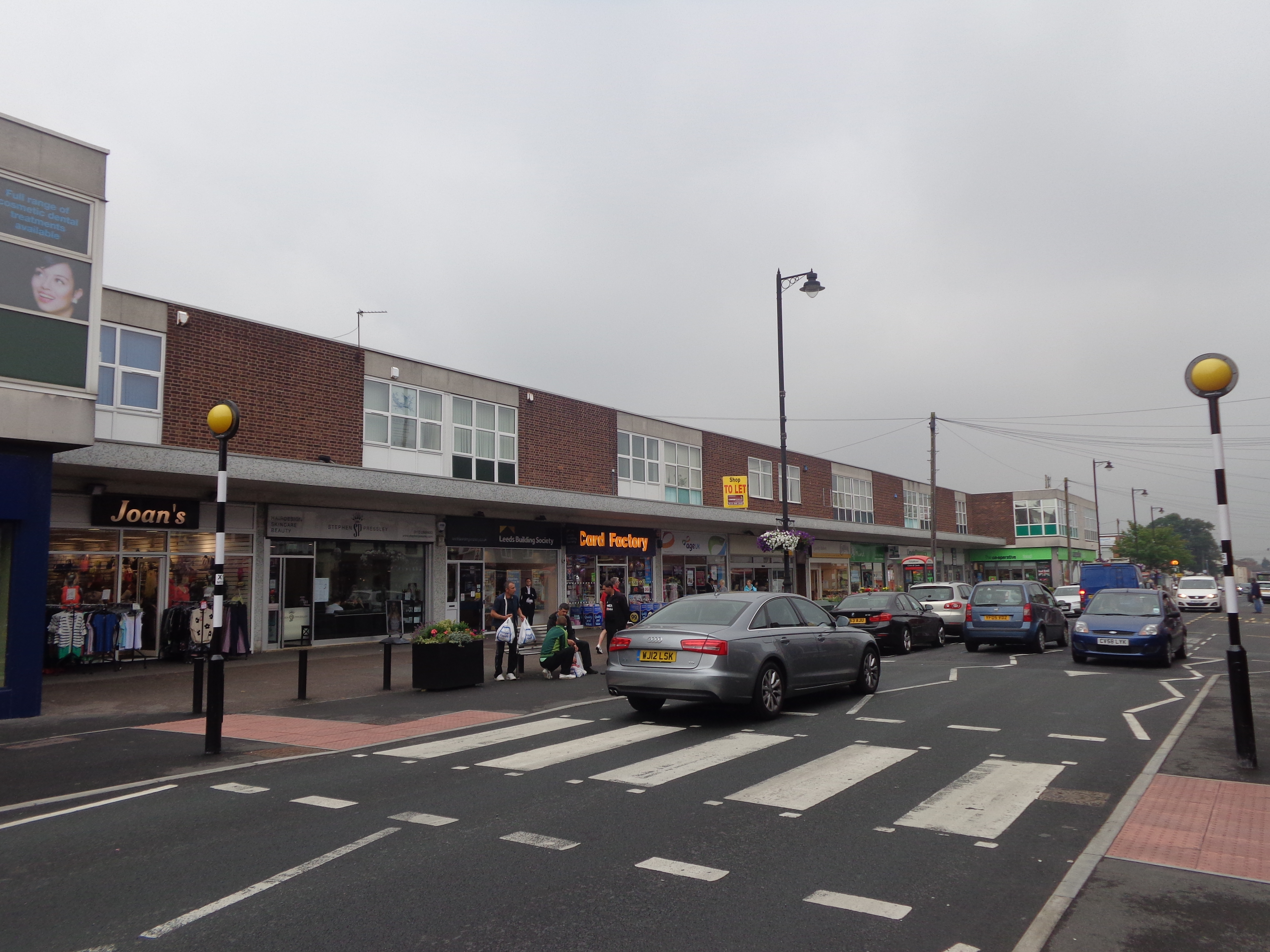
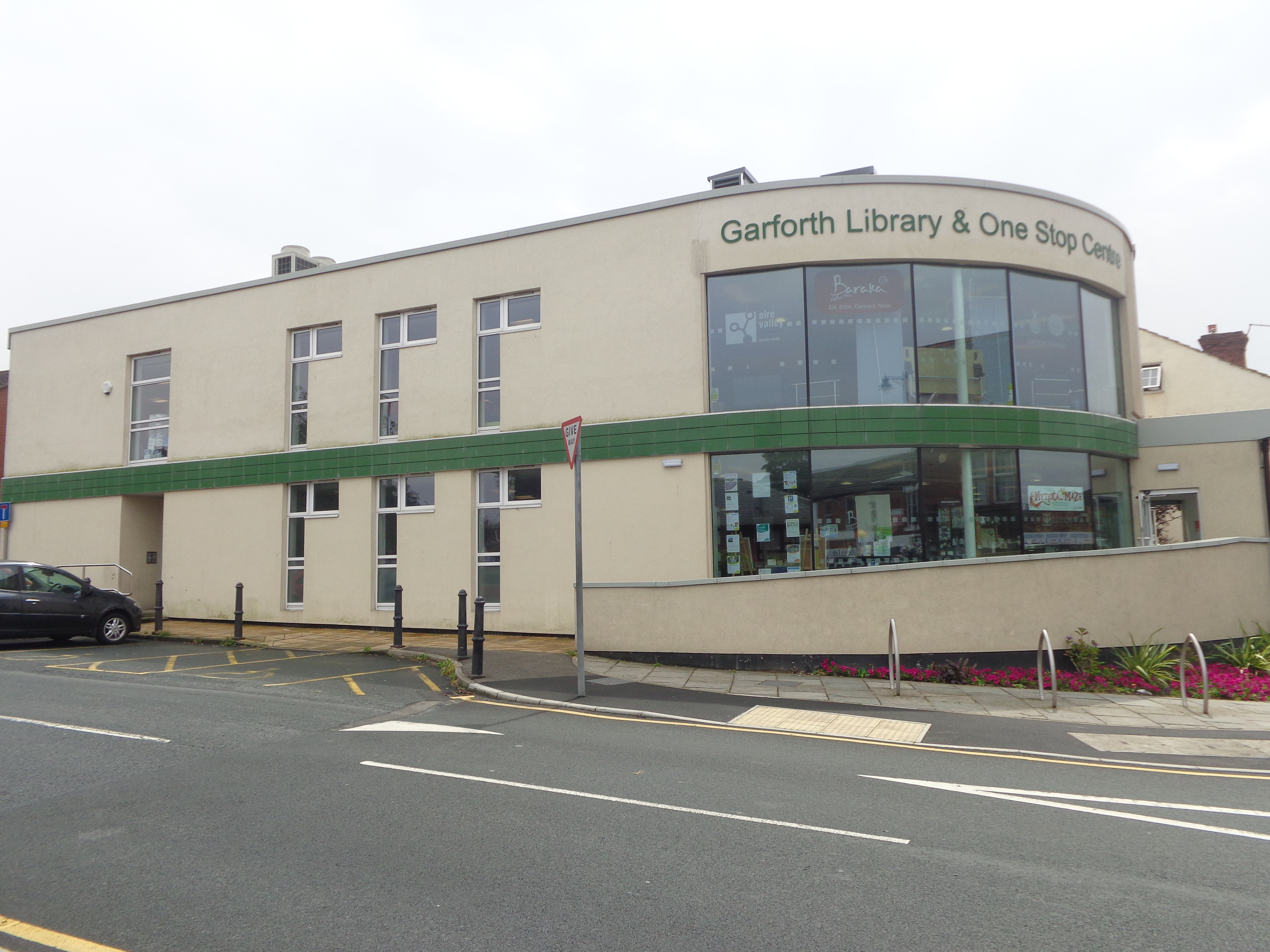
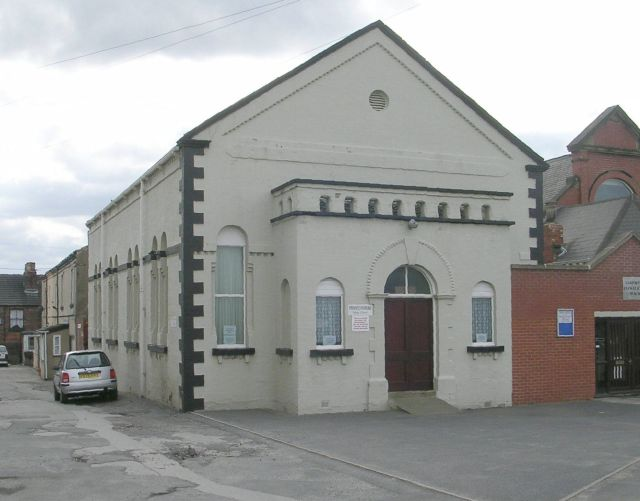
- Garforth Station St Mary's Church Shopping Parade Garforth Library Salem Chapel

- Location within West Yorkshire
- Population: 19,811 (Garforth and Swillington Ward. 2011 census)
- OS grid reference: SE403330
  - London: 165 mi (266 km) SSE
- Metropolitan borough: City of Leeds
- Metropolitan county: West Yorkshire
- Region: Yorkshire and the Humber
- Country: England
- Sovereign state: United Kingdom
- Post town: LEEDS
- Postcode district: LS25
- Dialling code: 0113
- Police: West Yorkshire
- Fire: West Yorkshire
- Ambulance: Yorkshire
- UK Parliament: Leeds East

Garforth (/ˈɡɑːrfərθ/) is a town in the metropolitan borough of the City of Leeds, West Yorkshire.

It sits in the Garforth and Swillington ward of Leeds City Council and the Leeds East parliamentary constituency. As of 2011, the population of Garforth was 14,957, having decreased since the last census. (Note: 48 output areas in the Garforth and Swillington ward make up the Garforth area.) It is 6.5 miles (10.5 km) east of Central Leeds, 16 miles (26 km) south-west of York and 10 miles (16 km) north of Wakefield. It is mostly an Un-Parished area, like much of Greater Leeds.

== Etymology ==
The place-name Garforth appears first in the Domesday Book of 1086 as Gereford and Gereforde, with gar- spellings first appearing in 1336 in the form Garford. The name seems to derive from the Norse words gāra ('triangular plot of land', derived from the word gār, 'spear') and ford ('ford)', and thus meant 'ford at a triangular plot of land'. Or perhaps, River Crossing of the Spear.

The plot is thought to have lain at a sharp turn in the road now called The Beck. Spellings beginning with ger- reflect the Old Norse counterpart of Old English gāra, geiri, and therefore the existence of Norse-influenced pronunciations of the name existing alongside Old English ones. Correspondingly, the district also once included the place Church Garforth, whose name is first attested in the fifteenth century as Kirkgarford; here again the form kirk reflects the Old Norse form of the word church, kirkja.

== History ==
Garforth owes its size to expansion in the seventeenth and eighteenth centuries during which the local land-owning Gascoigne family ran several coalmines in the area. The surrounding settlements of Micklefield, Kippax, Swillington, Methley and Allerton Bywater Great and Little Preston are all villages that prospered and grew as a result of the coal industry. Nowadays manufacturing and motor-vehicle repair account for more than a third of the workforce in the area.

More recent expansion can also be traced to a combination of overall economic success in Leeds, and that Garforth is served by transport links. The A1 and M1 are minutes away, and both have recently been linked by an extension of the M1 which passes to the west and north of the village, with two nearby access points at Junctions 46 and 47. The M1 extension led to rapid development of commercial, light industrial and residential sites clustered around Junctions 46 and 47. The village rail link to Kippax and Castleford was closed under the Beeching Axe of the 1960s.

Garforth has been home to first Garforth Scout Group since 1908. Garforth & District Lions Club was formed in 1972.

== Economy ==
Originally a coal mining area, the collieries of much of east Leeds and surrounding areas closed in the 1960s, although further south mining was still strong in the 1990s and is still prevalent to some degree today. Garforth has increasingly become a commuter town for Leeds, York & City of Wakefield area. There is a light industrial estate to the north of the village which provides some employment, such as Ginetta Cars, while the neighbouring Thorpe Business Park in Colton also provides employment. Garforth's rail connections and access to the M1, A1(M) and M62 have made it a desirable area for commuters to live.

== Amenities ==
Garforth's amenities are similar to some towns in the City of Leeds, such as Otley and Wetherby. Garforth civic amenities include a library and a one stop centre run by Leeds City Council. A coffee shop on Main Street functions partly as a social enterprise, giving its profits to projects in the village. Garforth has ten traditional public houses, a mix of restaurants/cafes/wine bars, and a number of social/affiliated clubs. There are also a number of take away food outlets.

The lively Garforth Community Choir was formed in October 2015 and meets at Garforth Academy on Wednesdays at 7.00 pm, in school term time.

There are two indoor play areas for children and a large skatepark.

Garforth also plays home to two brass bands, both of which rehearse and perform in and around the local area. There is Garforth Jubilee Band who are a non-contesting brass band, and there is Garforth Brass, who are a contesting brass band.

== Transport ==
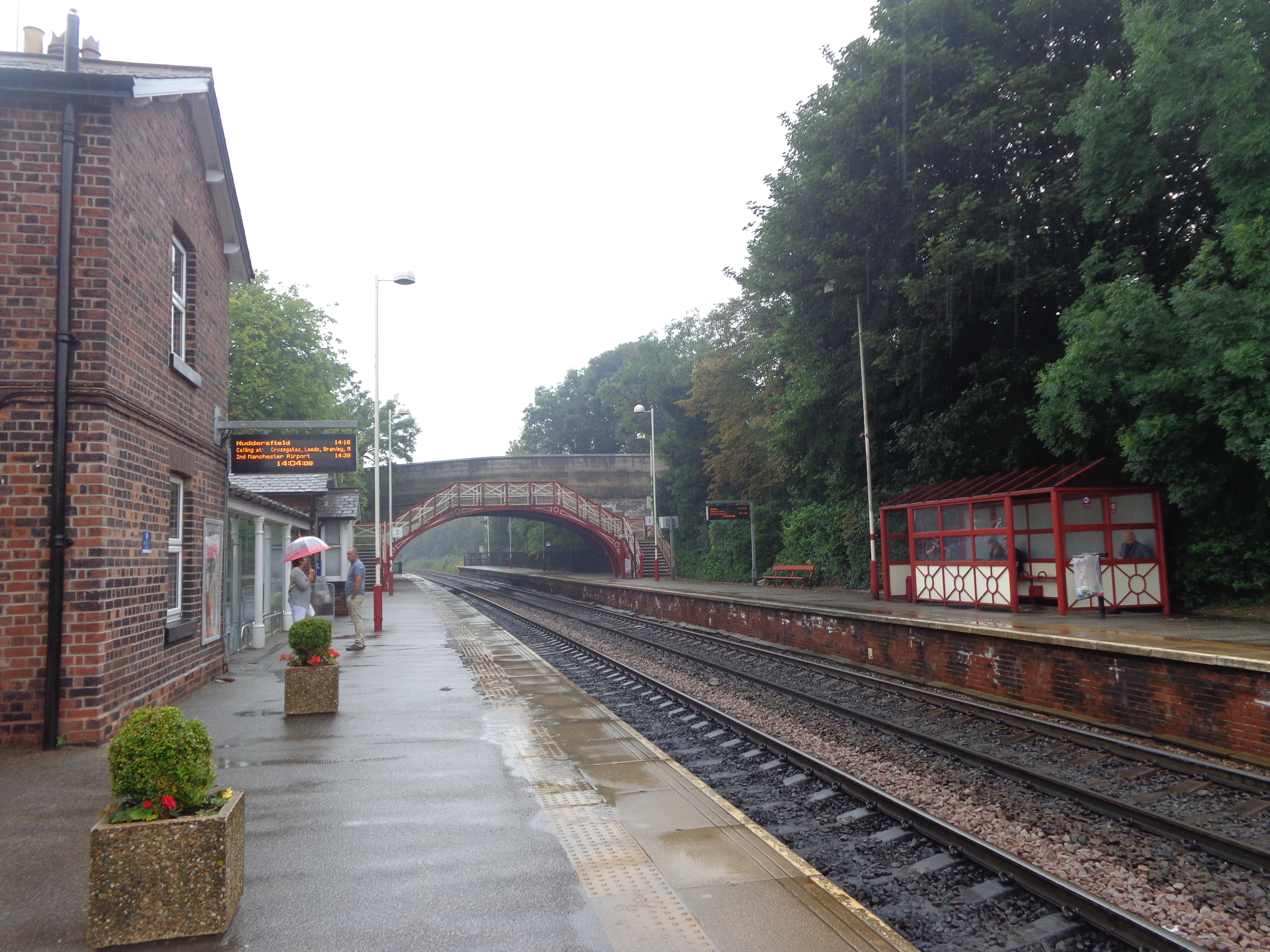
Garforth railway station

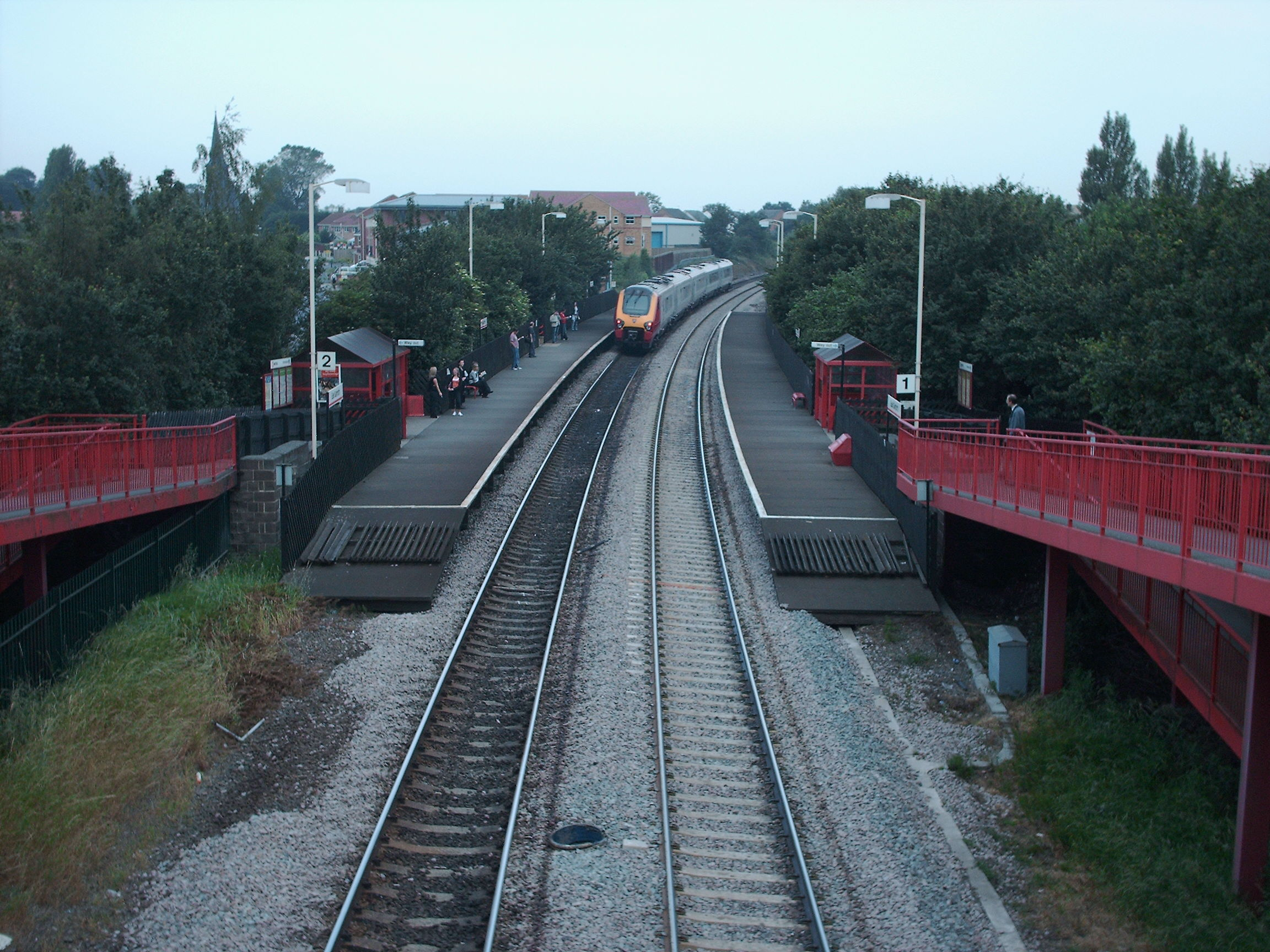
East Garforth railway station

Garforth is situated on the A63, which links it with the M1 and the A1(M), the M62 also lies close by to the south of the village.

Garforth has two railway stations. Garforth railway station lies to the north of the village centre, whist East Garforth railway station, which opened in the 1980s, lies to the east of the village, both stations on the mainline route between Leeds, York and North Eastern England to Scotland, and between Leeds, Selby and Hull and the Yorkshire coastal resorts. There are also rail links to Manchester, Newcastle upon Tyne, Liverpool and Blackpool.

Garforth's bus services are provided by First Leeds and Arriva Yorkshire.

=== High Speed Two ===
Under proposals released on 28 January 2013, Garforth would see the High Speed 2 railway line built close to the village, running adjacent to the M1 motorway. The High Speed Line would cross the existing railway line close to Thorpe Park to the west of the village. This line would carry the spur away from Leeds, towards the East Coast Main Line at Church Fenton. (Update) The decision to cancel the eastern leg was announced by Prime Minister Rishi Sunak in October 2023 at the Conservative Party Conference

== Education ==
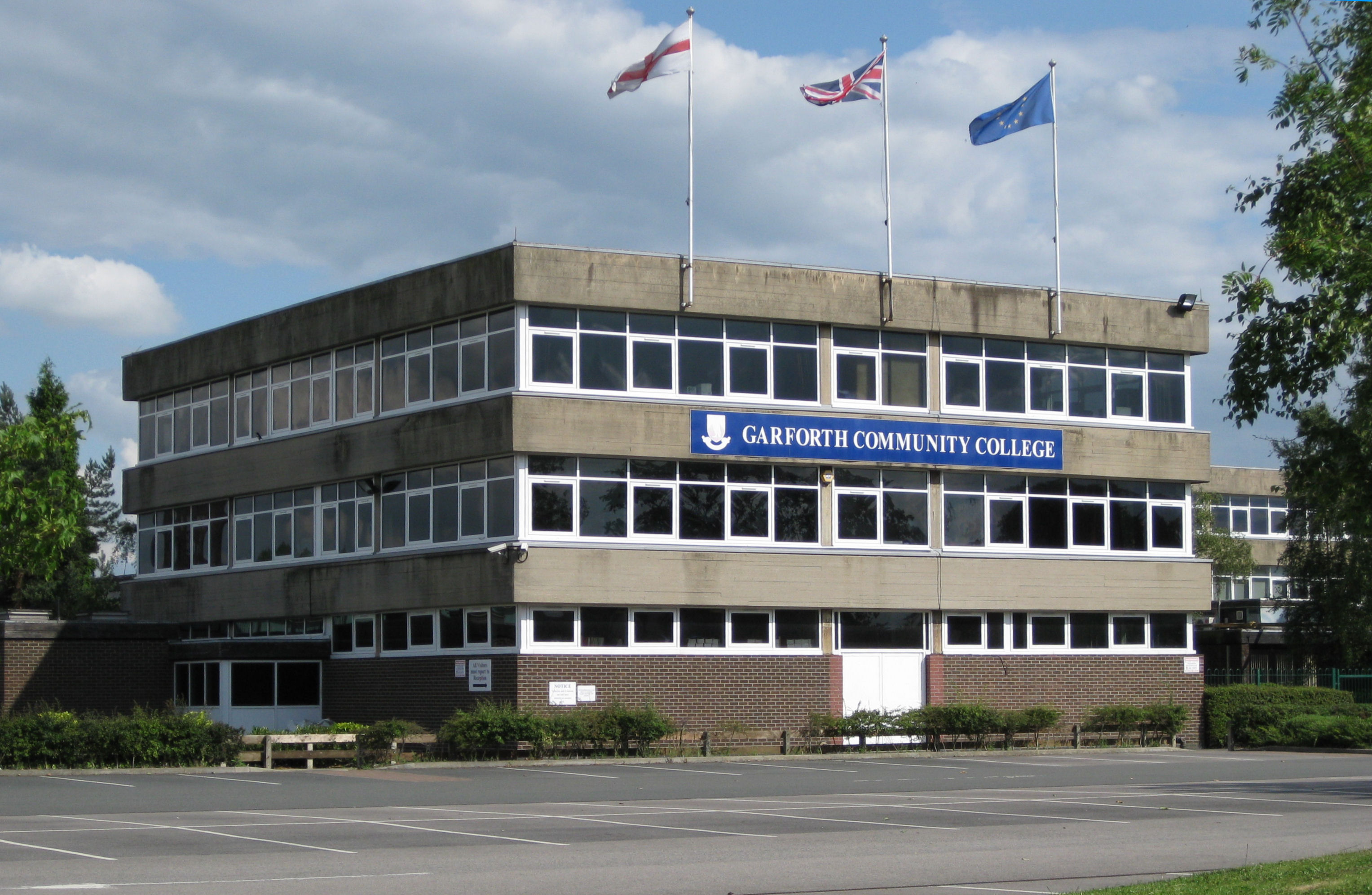
Garforth Academy

Education establishments in Garforth include a secondary school, primary schools and a vocational performing arts college.

Garforth Academy, a secondary school and sixth form for pupils aged 11–18 is located on Lidgett Lane in Garforth. The school has over 2,000 pupils and staff. Garforth Community Arts School (situated in Garforth Academy) runs the Garforth Arts Festival, which is a display of artistic works.

Opposite Garforth Academy is the recently refurbished Strawberry Fields Primary School, formerly known as West Garforth Primary School. Other Garforth schools are Ninelands Primary School, Green Lane Primary Academy, East Garforth Primary Academy and St Benedict's Primary School, which is a Catholic school.

SLP College is a further education college in Garforth, providing specialist vocational training in dance and performing arts. Founded as a dance school, it later developed a full-time performing arts course and is now a course provider for the Trinity College, London professional performing arts qualifications. The college is accredited to the Council for Dance Education and Training and one of the colleges selected to award the government Dance and Drama Awards.

== Sport ==
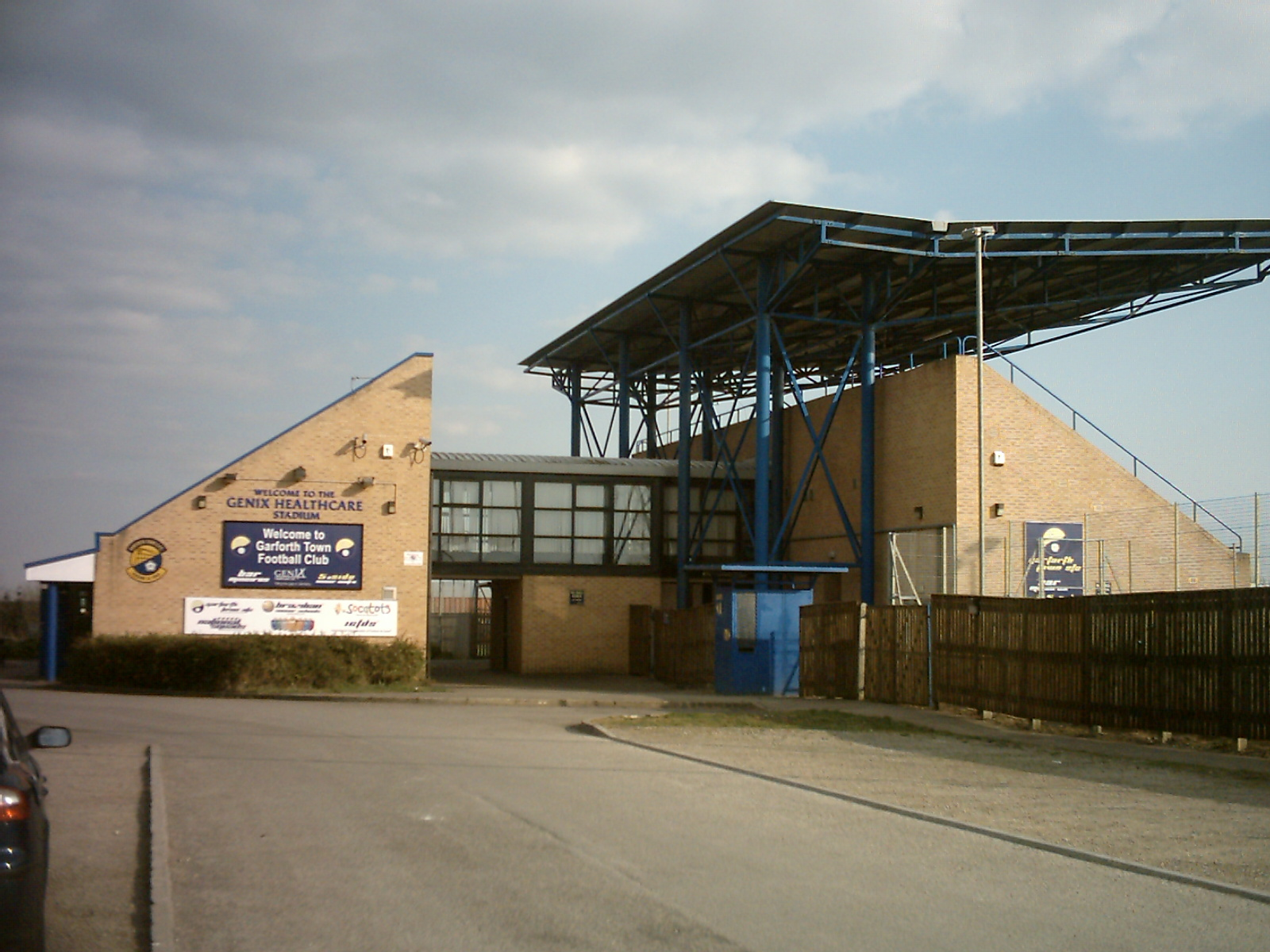
Bannister Prentice Community Stadium

There are two rugby clubs in Garforth, one League and one Union. Garforth Tigers/Tigresses ARLFC play Rugby League and are based at Glebelands Park. They have junior (from ages 3-18) and senior teams (from the age of 16) competing in the Yorkshire League. There is also a men's Rugby Union team: Garforth RUFC, who play their matches on Garforth Academy's playing fields.

Local football teams are Garforth Town A.F.C., Garforth Villa Football Club, Garforth W.M.C. A.F.C. and Garforth Rangers A.F.C. Garforth Town play at the Bannister Prentice Community Stadium (formerly known as Wheatley Park) which is located in the corner of the Cedar Ridge estate of Garforth.

There are also two cricket clubs, Garforth C.C. & Garforth Church Parish C.C., the Squash and Leisure Centre. and a Premier World Fitness Centre.

Garforth Golf Club has a course designed by Alister MacKenzie.

== Climate ==
The nearest weather station is in Wakefield, 13 miles (21 km) to the north. Garforth is notable for recording one of the latest instances of −10 °C (14 °F) in the United Kingdom, on 24 April 1908, the temperature fell to −12.8 °C (9.0 °F).

Climate data for Wakefield
| Month | Jan | Feb | Mar | Apr | May | Jun | Jul | Aug | Sep | Oct | Nov | Dec | Year |
|---|---|---|---|---|---|---|---|---|---|---|---|---|---|
| Mean daily maximum °C (°F) | 7 (44) | 7 (44) | 9 (49) | 12 (53) | 16 (60) | 18 (65) | 21 (69) | 21 (69) | 17 (63) | 13 (56) | 9 (49) | 7 (45) | 13 (56) |
| Mean daily minimum °C (°F) | 2 (36) | 2 (36) | 3 (37) | 4 (39) | 7 (45) | 10 (50) | 12 (54) | 12 (54) | 10 (50) | 7 (45) | 4 (39) | 3 (37) | 6 (44) |
| Average precipitation mm (inches) | 87 (3.41) | 64 (2.50) | 68 (2.67) | 62 (2.46) | 56 (2.19) | 67 (2.63) | 51 (2.01) | 64 (2.50) | 64 (2.53) | 74 (2.91) | 78 (3.06) | 92 (3.62) | 827 (32.49) |

== Notable people ==
Notable residents and ex-residents of Garforth include:England and Yorkshire cricketer Chris Silverwood; DJ Dave Seaman; Andrew White of the Kaiser Chiefs; John Birch of Leeds, England & Great Britain rugby league teams; and BAFTA nominated comedian Liam Williams, who created and stars in Ladhood , a comedy TV series based on his experience of growing up in Garforth. The village was also the birthplace of Second World War airman, Sir Augustus Walker of the Royal Air Force. Jack Charlton owned a menswear shop in the town, and was a resident for a number of years.

== References in literature ==
The book The Modfather was set in Garforth in the late 1970s and early 1980s detailing David Lines adolescence in the village and his obsession with Paul Weller.

== Gallery ==
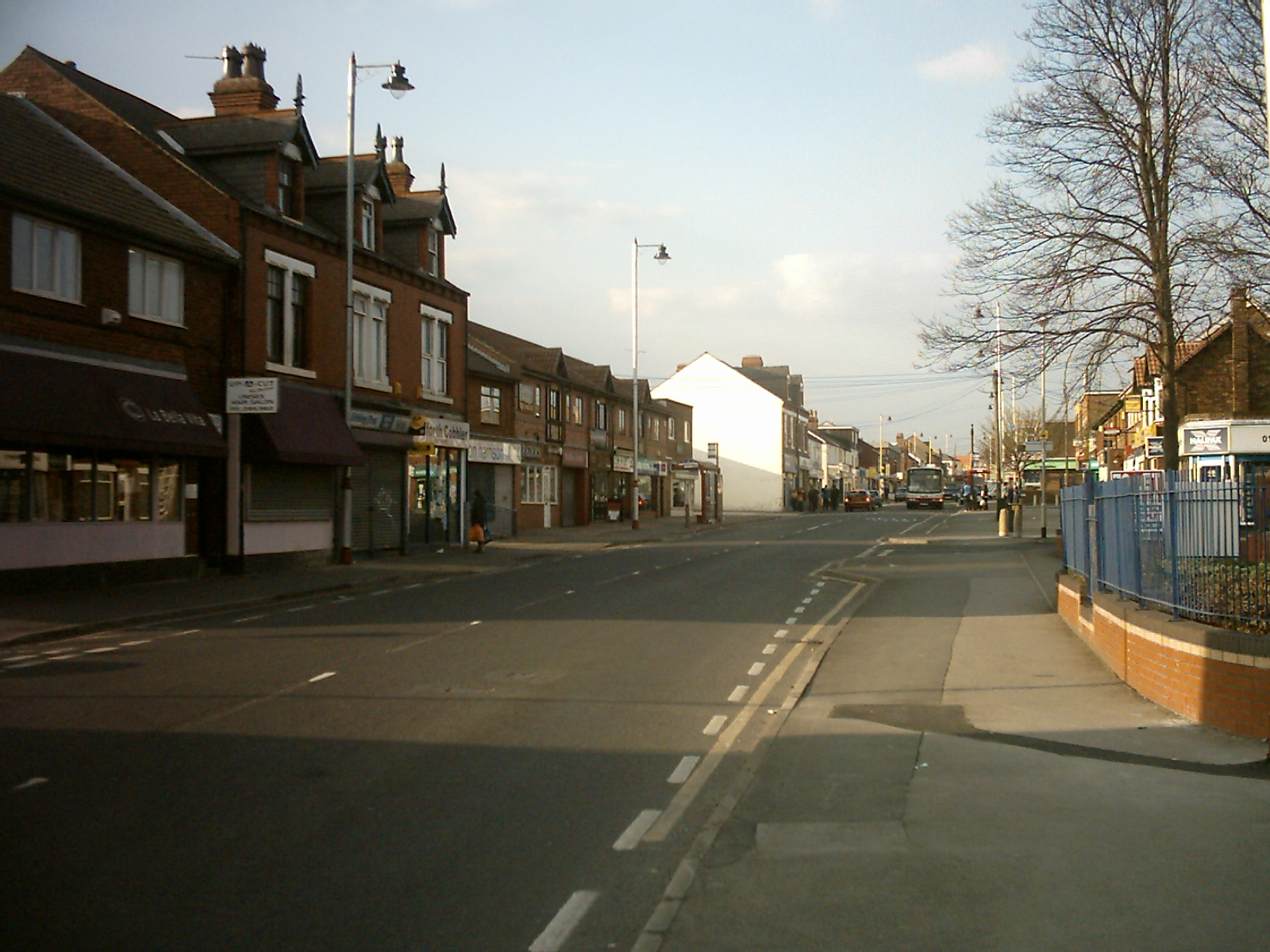
Main Street, Garforth

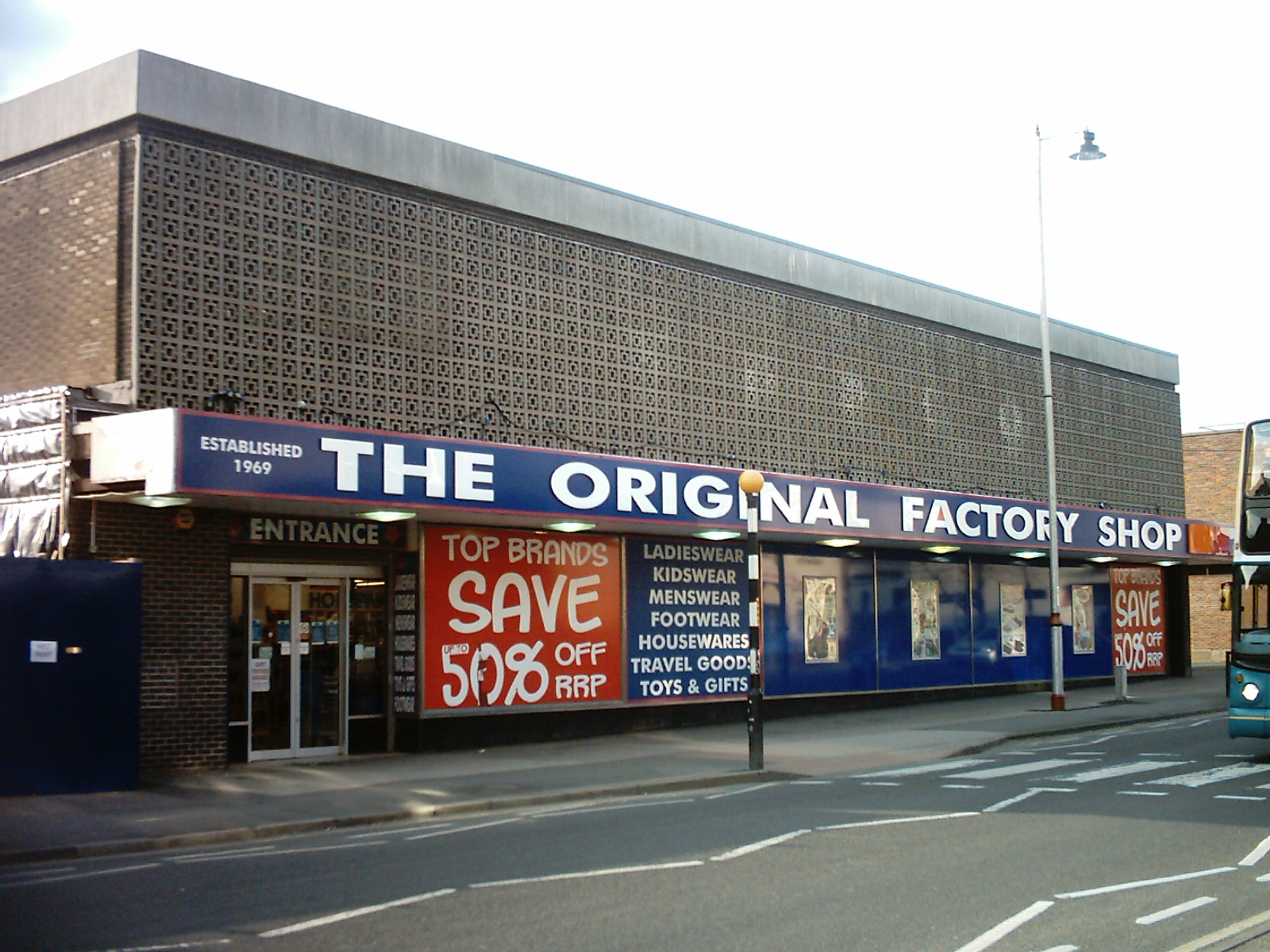
The Original Factory Shop

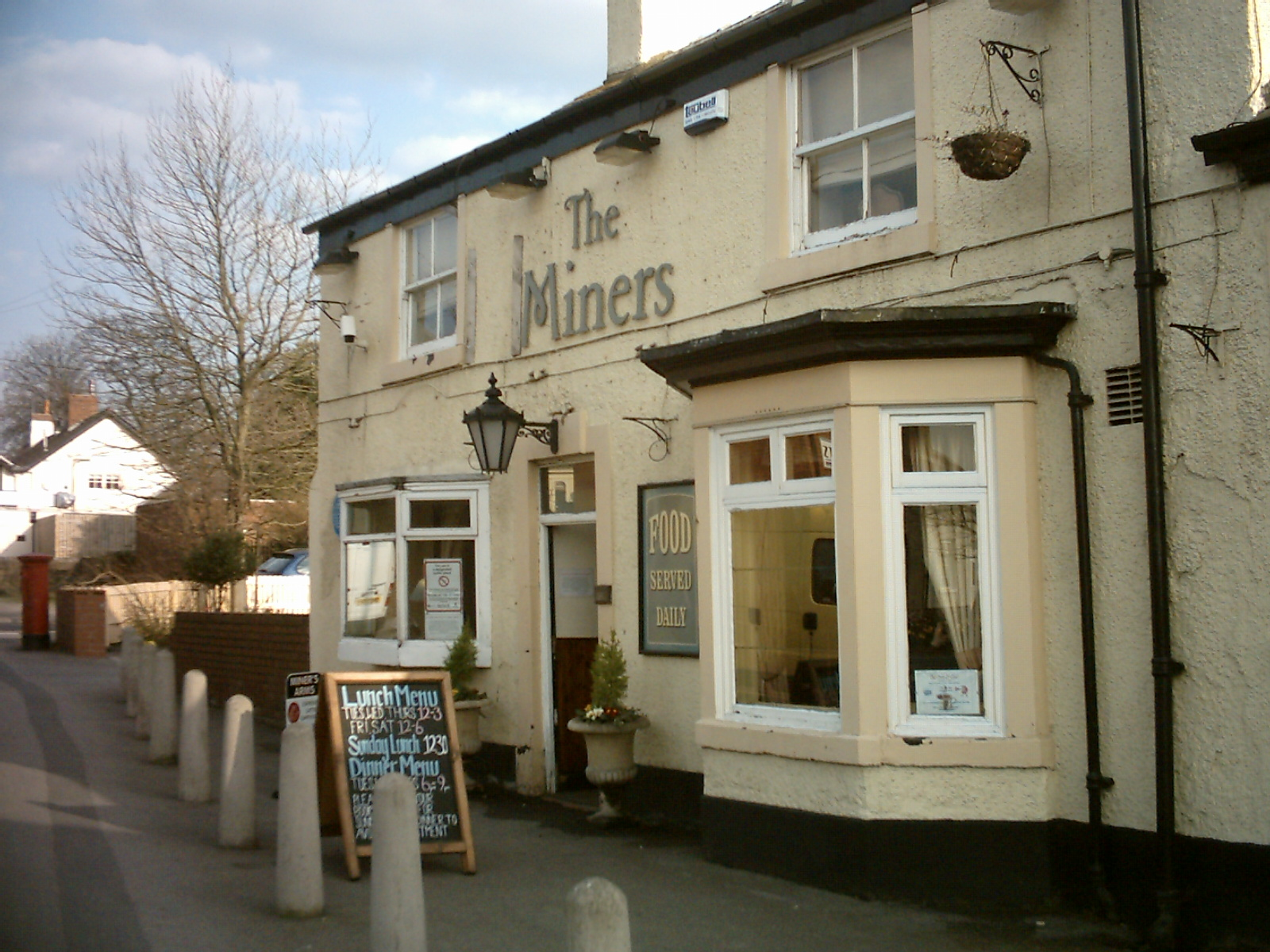
The Miners, a pub in Garforth

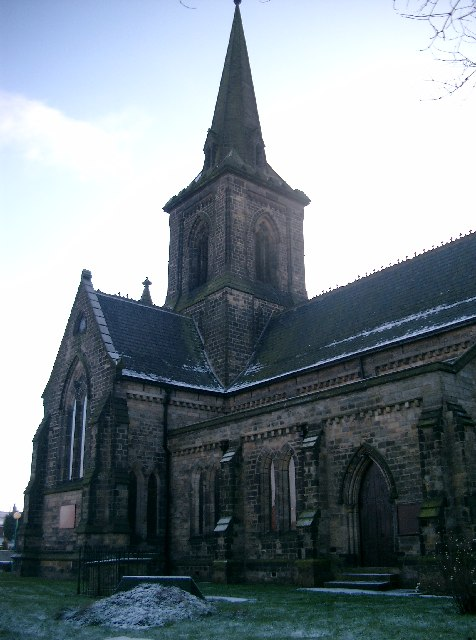
St Mary's Church

== See also ==
- Listed buildings in Garforth and Swillington
- Garforth Town A.F.C.
