= Allerton Bywater =

Village and civil parish in West Yorkshire, England

Coordinates: 53.7421°N 1.3571°W

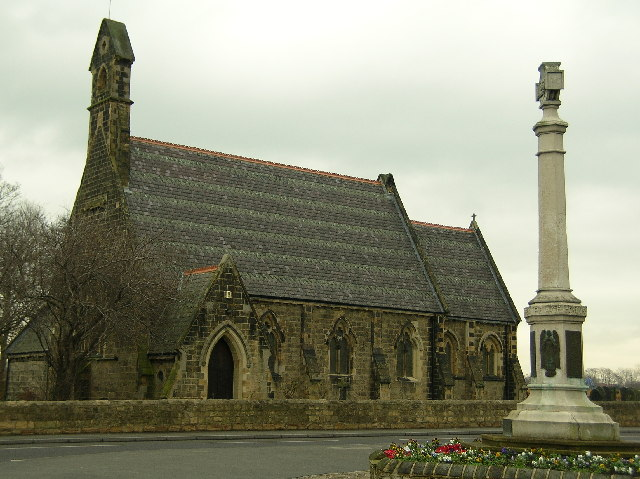
- Main Street: St Mary the Less church and the war memorial

- Location within West Yorkshire
- Population: 4,717 (2011 census)
- OS grid reference: SE425275
- Civil parish: Allerton Bywater
- Metropolitan borough: City of Leeds
- Metropolitan county: West Yorkshire
- Region: Yorkshire and the Humber
- Country: England
- Sovereign state: United Kingdom
- Post town: CASTLEFORD
- Postcode district: WF10
- Dialling code: 01977/0113
- Police: West Yorkshire
- Fire: West Yorkshire
- Ambulance: Yorkshire
- UK Parliament: Selby

Allerton Bywater is a semi-rural village and civil parish in the south-east of the City of Leeds metropolitan borough in West Yorkshire, England. The population of the civil parish at the 2011 census was 4,717. The village itself is 2 miles (3.2 km) north of Castleford, with neighbouring villages Kippax and Great Preston all providing local amenities. St Aidan's Nature reserve borders the village attracting many visitors with its beauty and charm. Additionally "The Lines Way" bridle path which runs from Garforth through to Allerton following the old train track provides a pleasant route for walkers, joggers and cyclists alike. The River Aire flows through the village to the south-west.

Allerton Bywater is built up of several smaller communities, mainly old mining villages such as Brigshaw, Hollinhurst and Bowers Row.

== Etymology ==
The name Allerton is first attested in the Domesday Book, in the forms Alretun, Alretune and Alretona. It comes from the Old English word alor ('alder tree'), in its genitive plural form alra, and the word tūn ('farmstead, estate'). Thus it originally meant 'farmstead of the alder trees'.

Since Allerton is a common place-name in Yorkshire, the name 'by water' was added to distinguish it from places such as Chapel Allerton and Moor Allerton; it refers to the village's proximity to the River Aire. This appellation is first attested in Latin form, as 'Allerton juxta aquam' ('Allerton next to water'), in 1258. The name is first recorded in English in 1430 as 'Allerton by þe water'.

The settlement also comprises Allerton Ings, first attested in 1554 as Allerton ynges. The last element of this name comes from the Middle English word ing ('meadow'), itself borrowed from Old Norse eng (of the same meaning).

== Early history ==
=== Coal mining ===
Coal mining in the area can be traced back to the 15th century. In the 17th century Bell pit mining took place in the south east corner of Hollinhurst Wood. The first colliery in the village operated from 1756 to 1820 mining the shallow Warren House seam. From 1840 to 1875 the 140 yard deep Haigh Moor seam was exploited. The Allerton Bywater Colliery was the third colliery in the village and operated from 1875 until its closure in 1992. Other pits operated in the neighbouring communities of Hollinhurst and Bowers Row, including Allerton Main Collieries (Albert and Victoria Pits), Lowther Colliery and Allerton Colliery. The human cost of mining coal was high. At least 99 miners died in the village collieries between 1856 and 1991, including 14 boys under the age of 18. The worst disaster was an explosion in March 1930 which killed five men. When Allerton Bywater Colliery closed, 1,060 jobs were lost and millions of tonnes of coal were abandoned underground.

=== Allerton Pottery ===
Robinson Brothers operated as earthenware and pottery manufacturers at premises on Main Street, Allerton Bywater. A fire at the pottery in 1888 caused £700 worth of damage to the upper storey and roof of a building measuring 20 yards long by 8 yards wide. 2 tons of straw were lost in the blaze which was caused by a pan of wax boiling over. A map of Allerton Bywater dated 1893 shows the site of the pottery between the River Aire and Main Street at the northern end of the street. The brothers, John and Tom, also operated a pottery in Castleford known as Eleven Acres Pottery. Examples of their red earthenware flower pots can be found in the Wakefield Museum Collections. In 1898 the Robinson Brothers partnership was dissolved by mutual consent. Thereafter, John Robinson continued to carry on business at the Castleford Pottery and Tom Robinson continued at the Allerton Pottery. By 1902 Tom was in financial difficulties and a receiving order was made in respect of his bankruptcy. The Encyclopaedia of British Pottery and Porcelain Marks gives two marks for the Allerton Pottery: R.B. for Robinson Brothers (1897–1904) and J.R & S. for John Robinson & Son (1905–1933).

=== Bowers Row ===
Bowers Row was originally a mining community comprising eight streets, 120 houses, a school house and a chapel. Nearly every male resident worked at one of the two pits (Bowers Victoria and Bowers Albert) to the north of the village. The school was built in 1865 by the local landowners, the Lowthers. The first chapel, known as Bowers Allerton Mission Hall, was built in 1896. The current Mission Hall was started in 1927. The original houses were demolished in the 1950s and the school became the Alexander Rose sewing factory.

== Recent history ==
A recent development within Allerton Bywater is the Millennium Village. The Allerton Bywater Millennium Village, part of the Millennium Communities Programme will provide 520 homes (including low cost housing) and 25,000 m^{2} of commercial and community space.

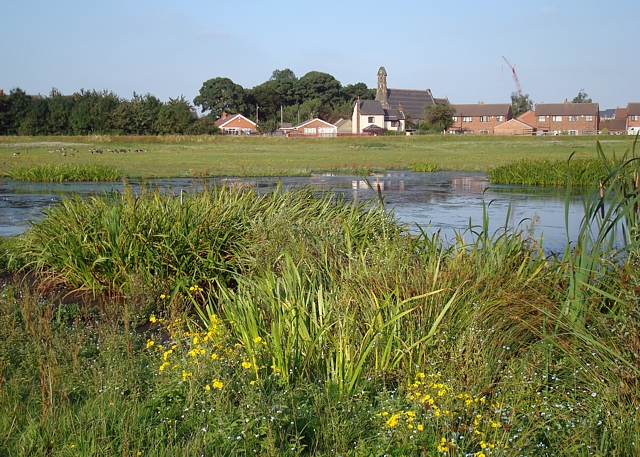
Waterside vegetation in Allerton Bywater.

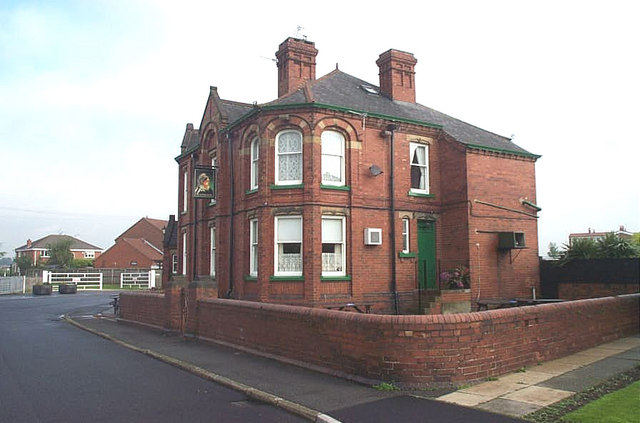
The Victoria pub.

In June 2007 residents and motorists were rescued from floodwaters by firefighters and RAF helicopter after torrential rain. Heavy rain in November 2000 also forced nearby residents from flooded homes. Allerton Bywater is approximately 1 mile from St Aidan's, a 400 hectare wetland.

Allerton Bywater was in local and national news in 2008 when the Congregation of St John's Catholic church protested against the closure of their Parish Church, chaining themselves to railings when assessors came around to assess the value of the church and lands. This was followed by a strong campaign of letters and e-mails and interviews with the BBC. The congregation remaining loyal to their Priest petitioned the Vatican and employed a Catholic Canon Lawyer to defend their case. This was the strongest opposition to the closure of a Catholic Church in Yorkshire since 1989 when the Church of Mount St Marys in Leeds was closed which was seen at the time as a scandal.

The east Leeds bikers club is based in Allerton Bywater and holds meetings every Wednesday.

Jessica Learmonth, who in 2021 won the gold medal in the triathlon mixed relay at the 2020 Summer Olympics in Tokyo, lives in Allerton Bywater.

== See also ==
- Brigshaw High School
- List of Yorkshire Pits
