= Swillington =

Village and civil parish in West Yorkshire, England

Coordinates: 53.7680°N 1.4201°W

- Location within West Yorkshire
- Population: 3,381 (2011 census)
- OS grid reference: SE385305
  - London: 160 mi (260 km) SSE
- Civil parish: Swillington
- Metropolitan borough: City of Leeds
- Metropolitan county: West Yorkshire
- Region: Yorkshire and the Humber
- Country: England
- Sovereign state: United Kingdom
- Post town: LEEDS
- Postcode district: LS26
- Dialling code: 0113
- Police: West Yorkshire
- Fire: West Yorkshire
- Ambulance: Yorkshire
- UK Parliament: Leeds East

Swillington is a village and civil parish near Leeds, West Yorkshire, England, in the City of Leeds metropolitan borough. It is situated 5 miles (8 km) east from Leeds city centre, north of the River Aire, and is surrounded by streams including Fleakingley Beck. In 2001, Swillington had a population of about 3,530, reducing to 3,381 at the 2011 Census.

The village forms part of the Garforth and Swillington ward of Leeds City Council and was a coal mining village until the closure of Primrose Hill pit. A housing estate now sits on the site of the colliery.

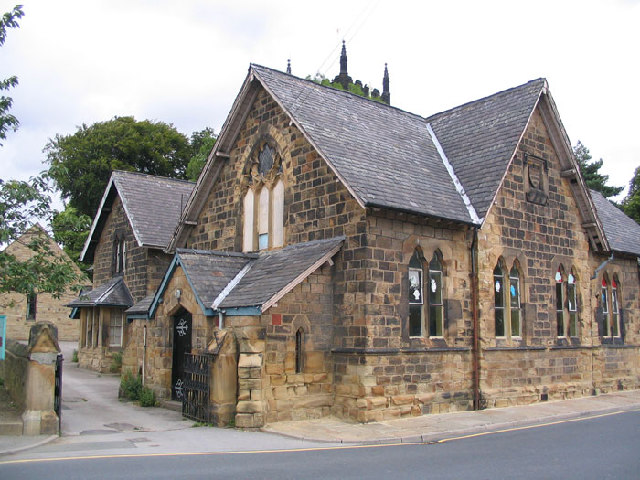
The Old Church School in Swillington

St Mary's Church in Swillington

The village is close to St Aidan's nature reserve, and the Leeds Country Way which passes through the village. The population of Swillington decreased to 3,088 in 2011.

== Etymology ==
The name Swillington is first attested in the Domesday Survey in the forms "Suillictun", "Suilligtune" and "Suillintun". Its etymology is uncertain, but probably derives from Old English swīn "pig" + either lēah "open ground" or hyll "hill" + ing, a suffix which in this case marks the word as a place-name + tūn "estate, farm". The Dictionary of British Place Names gives a derivation from "farmstead near the pig hill (or clearing)."

The name was recorded as "Svilentone" in 1147. Historically Swillington's full title was Swillington-in-Elmet, which refers to the association of the village with the early medieval polity of Elmet. However, as with many other places the "-in-Elmet" has been lost in modern times with only a few exceptions such as Barwick-in-Elmet and Sherburn-in-Elmet surviving.

== Economy ==
Swillington sits at the centre of an agricultural community, and includes Leventhorpe Vineyard and an organic farm.

Leventhorpe Vineyard, established in 1986, is near the village, and has been recommended by Rick Stein. It was until recently the most northerly commercial vineyard in Britain—there is now one further north, near Malton.

The Soil Association-certified organic farm on the former Lowther estate has been frequented by celebrity chefs, and has produce voted the 'Best Meat In Yorkshire' in 2007.

== Landmarks ==
Swillington sits on the banks of the River Aire, and is adjacent to the RSPB St Aidan's Nature Reserve. The parish church of St Mary is a Grade II* listed building of 14th- or 15th-century origin, with Victorian additions. Leventhorpe Hall, within the parish and to the west of the village, is a Grade II* listed house built in 1774.

== Transport ==
Swillington does not have a railway station, unlike the nearby town of Garforth, but is served by bus operators. The major roads through the village are Wakefield Road (the A642), Swillington Lane and Astley Lane.

Under proposals released on 28 January 2013, Phase 2 of the High Speed 2 rail link would be built close to the western side of the village, running adjacent to the M1 motorway. The HS2 track would cross the existing railway line close to Thorpe Park to the north of the village and also cross Selby road via embankment and bridge. Further south a viaduct would be placed across Wakefield Road. This line would carry the spur away from Leeds, towards the East Coast Main Line at Church Fenton.

== Education ==
The local school, Swillington Primary School has about 270 pupils. Swillington does not have its own secondary school, consequently pupils typically attend Garforth Academy or Brigshaw High School.

YEDL, the local electricity distribution company, has its overhead line school at Swillington where it trains its apprenticed and qualified linesmen in techniques required to work on the electricity network throughout its licence area.

== Sport and recreation ==
The village has four local football teams, a bowls team, snooker teams and a rugby league team. They use recreational grounds surviving from the mining days. There is also a shooting and country sports supply business in town, and a number of horse riding stables. Swillington Church also host many groups, including a keen bell ringing team.

== Location ==
Nearby villages and towns include Austhorpe, Garforth, Kippax, Castleford, Great Preston, Little Preston, Allerton Bywater, Oulton, Woodlesford, Rothwell, Pontefract, Colton, Swillington Common and Methley.

== Notable people ==
- John Chamber (1546–1604), clergyman and author on astronomy, was baptised at Swillington.
- John Dobson, Anglican priest and Dean of Ripon
- Andrew White (guitarist of the Kaiser Chiefs).
- William Lowther (1757–1844), and other "Lowthers of Swinnington" (English and Saville 1983:78–81, on "Strict Settlement")

== See also ==
- Listed buildings in Garforth and Swillington
