= Garforth Academy =

Academy in Garforth, West Yorkshire, England

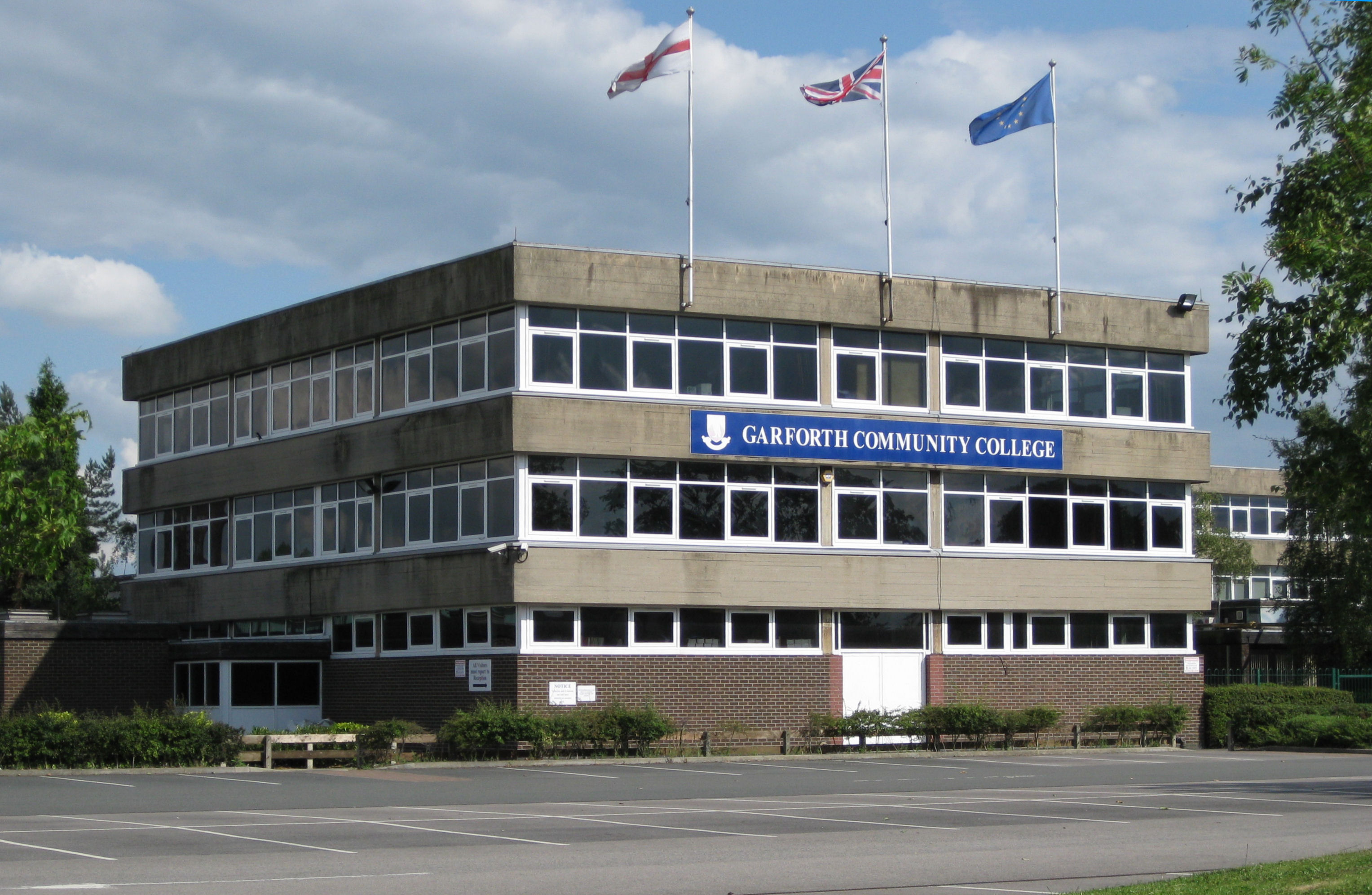

Location
- Lidgett Lane; Garforth, West Yorkshire, LS25 1LJ; England; 53.78799°N 1.39196°W

Information
- Type: Academy
- Motto: "Reaching for Excellence"
- Established: 1967
- Department for Education URN: 136343 Tables
- Ofsted: Reports
- Principal: Anna Young
- Staff: 83
- Age: 11 to 18
- Enrolment: 1998
- Website: http://www.garforthacademy.org.uk

Garforth Academy (formerly known as Garforth Comprehensive School until September 1992 and Garforth Community College until November 2010) is a secondary school and sixth form for pupils aged 11–18 and is located on Lidgett Lane (B6137) in Garforth, West Yorkshire, England.

The school been awarded the Artsmark (2002), Investors in People Award, (2003), Schools Achievement Award, (2003), Education Extra award, (2001), Sportsmark (2002), and Beacon School status (2000), and OFSTED described the school in 2010 (before it changed to academy status) as an "outstanding school".

== History ==
The school was opened as Garforth Comprehensive School in 1967. Barbara Castle, Member of Parliament for Blackburn, performed an official opening of the school on 11 October 1969.

By 1992, the school was known as Garforth Community College. In November 2010, the school became Garforth Academy under the Academies Act 2010, becoming a part of the Delta Academies Trust.

== Extracurricular activities ==
Since 2008, Garforth Academy has partnered with Mzuvele High School in KwaMashu, Durban. In 2011, students from Garforth Academy travelled to Mzuvele to take part in a musical collaboration with students from the school.

In 2010, Garforth Academy hosted the launch of Arts Live, a community arts partnership between the school, Brigshaw High School and ArtForms, the music and arts service provided by Education Leeds.

== In literature ==
In the book The Modfather, David Lines describes his time at the school in the late 1970s and early 1980s in great detail. He described the school as looking like a cold hard slab of institutionalised concrete and, after leaving a leafy Nottinghamshire grammar school, described his shock on his first day of the pupils wearing 'menacing boots' and watching his classmates 'literally kicking seven shades out of each other'.

== Academic performance ==
As a result of improvements in the previous decade, the headteacher, Paul Edwards, received a knighthood in the New Year Honours 2009 for services to local and national education.

== Notable alumni ==
- Gabby Adcock, badminton player
- Will Boyle, footballer
- Jake Charles, footballer
- James Denny, diver
- Jessica Fletcher, badminton
- Sian Gabbidon, businesswoman
- Mitchell Lund, footballer
- Oli McBurnie, footballer
- Lucy-Jo Hudson, actress
- Gary Keedy, cricketer
- Chris Silverwood, cricketer
- Phil Sharpe, footballer & football manager
- Jenny Wallwork, badminton player
- Andrew White, musician
- Ryan Hudson, Rugby League player
- Tom Olbison, Rugby League player
- Tommy Spurr, footballer
- Liam Williams, comedian/writer
