= Brigshaw High School =

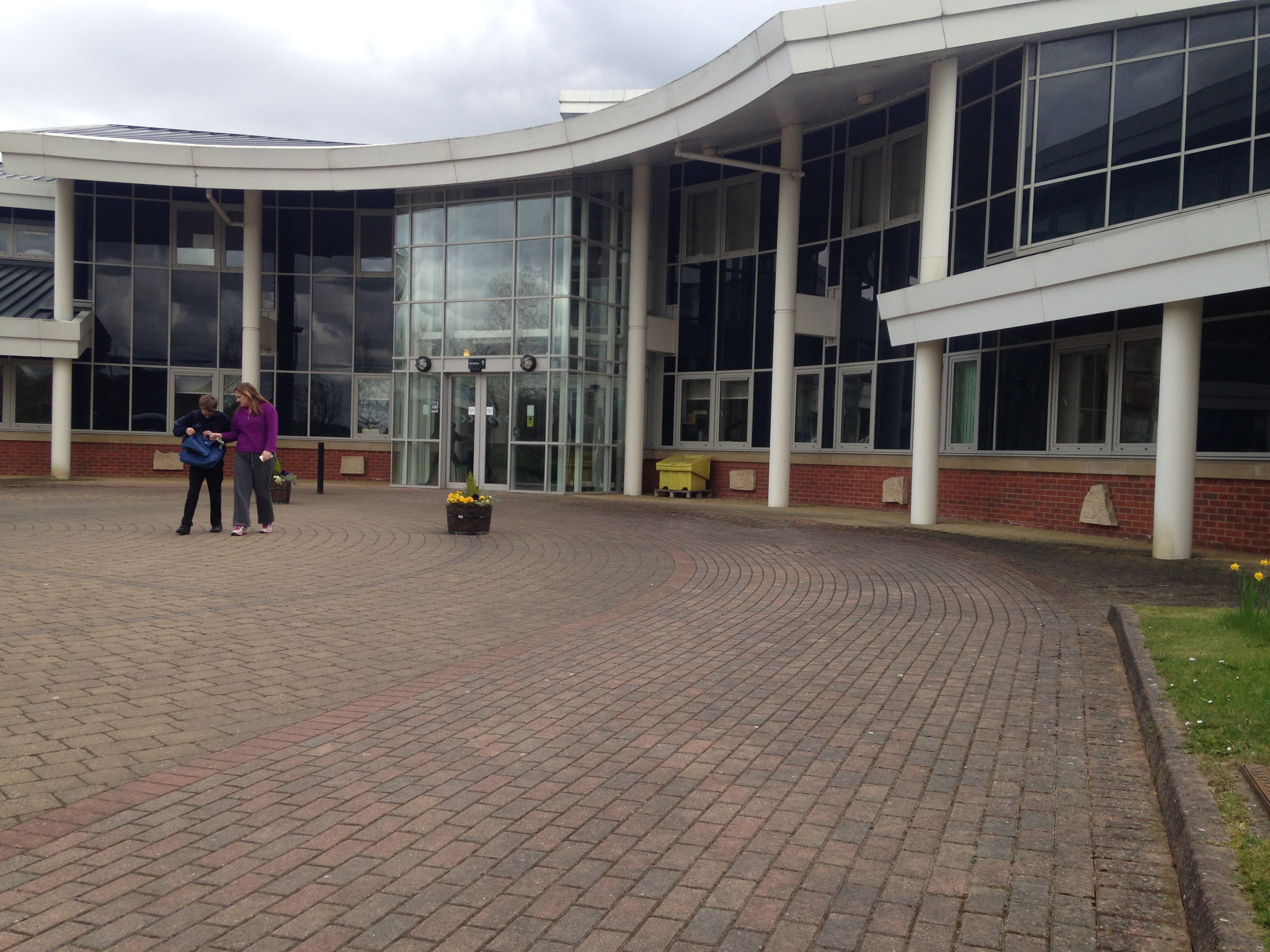
- Main Building reception

Location
- Brigshaw Lane; Allerton Bywater, West Yorkshire, WF10 2HR; England; 53.75705°N 1.38048°W

Information
- Type: Academy
- Established: 1972
- Local authority: City of Leeds
- Department for Education URN: 143238 Tables
- Ofsted: Reports
- Head teacher: Duncan Roberts
- Gender: Coeducational
- Age: 11 to 18
- Website: http://www.brigshaw.com

Brigshaw High School is a coeducational secondary school and sixth form located in the village of Allerton Bywater, West Yorkshire, England.

== History ==
The school was opened in September 1972 with only 3 buildings within the school grounds, the main block, music and the sports block. In the first academic year, the school consisted of a first and second year from feeder schools and additional pupils from Sherburn High School. The first headmaster was a Mr Rollinson. The school's first musical production, 'The Boyfriend' was performed in 1978 followed by 'Oliver' in 1979. A new block, 'De-Lacy', was built in the mid-1980s to cope with school growth.

In September 2004 the school became a specialist Language College as part of the UK's Specialist schools programme. Feeder schools include Colton Primary School, Swillington Primary School, Great and Little Preston Primary School, Kippax North Junior and Infant School, Allerton Bywater Primary, Methley Primary schools, Kippax Ash Tree Primary school and Kippax Greenfields Primary school. In the 2016 curriculum, Brigshaw had successfully changed from a language college to a national academy. In July 2016, the school established the Brigshaw Learning Partnership, which includes nearby schools such as Kippax Ash Tree, Kippax North, Allerton Primary and Swillington Primary.

On 9 June 2016, David Cameron came to Brigshaw to tell students and staff about the EU Referendum, as part of his trail.

Until the 2019 academic year, the uniform for the school was different to most schools, with the uniform only being a polo shirt and trousers, however, they have recently changed the uniform to a blazer with a shirt and tie, and students are required to wear trousers or a skirt with the school logo on.

== Campus ==
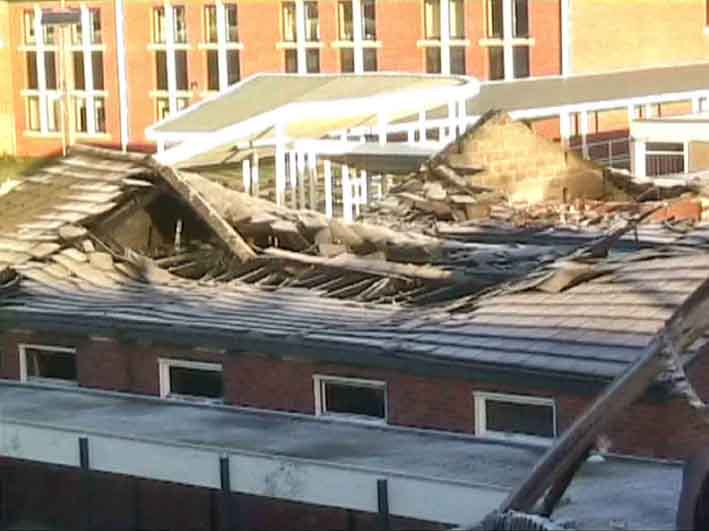
Brigshaw's Sports Hall fire aftermath

=== Silkstone ===
The original main building was destroyed by an arson fire on 1 April 2000. It was rebuilt in 2002 at a cost of £7 million and opened in December 2002. It was renamed Silkstone after a coal face located underneath the school. In July 2016, the school has recently added extra security by securing all other entrances apart from reception with a gate.

The music building is the only building left which remains from the original 1972 construction. In recent years the building has been renovated with new windows, new equipment and state of the art Macintosh computers.

=== Sports hall ===
After being destroyed by a fire in 2003, the sports hall was rebuilt in July 2005 at a cost of £2.5 million. The new sports facility includes a gymnasium, a wooden floor gym, workout room, dance studio, a running track, football and rugby fields and indoor tennis and basketball courts and a bike track.

== Federation ==
The schools in the Brigshaw Federation have worked closely over recent years. Eight of the schools in the Federation formally consulted on establishing a shared 'Trust' for the partnership and achieved this on 1 April 2010.

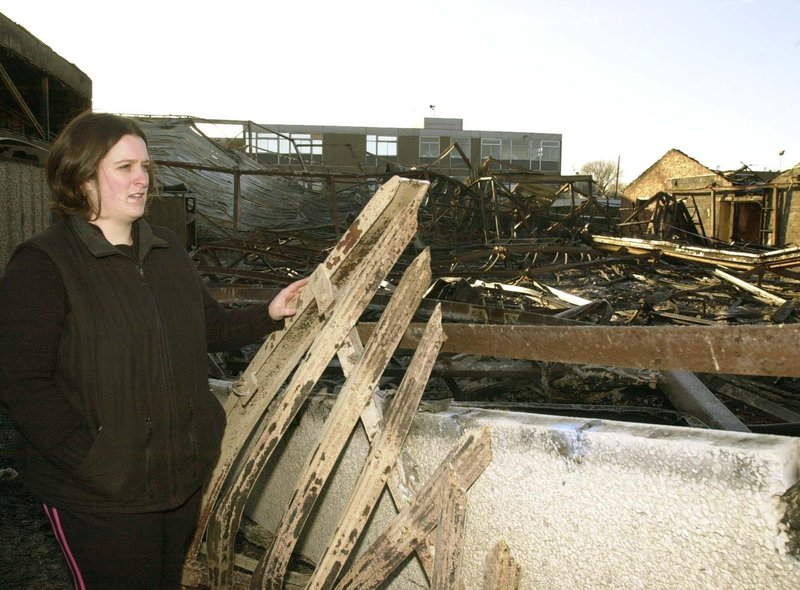
Brigshaw Sports Hall fire aftermath

Within the Trust are Allerton Bywater Primary School; Brigshaw High School; Great Preston C of E Primary School; Kippax Greenfields Primary School; Kippax North Junior and Infants School; Kippax Ash Tree Primary School; Lady Elizabeth Hastings C of E Primary School; Methley Primary School; and Swillington Primary School.

== Prime Minister's Global Fellowship ==
School pupils have gained places on the Prime Minister's Global Fellowship programme, the first in the inaugural year of the programme, 2008, and again in 2009.

== Notable alumni ==
- Mandip Gill (born 1988), actress (Doctor Who, Hollyoaks)
