= Tigers That Talked =

British band

Tigers That Talked are a four-piece British art rock/folk rock band. The name of the band comes from the book In Watermelon Sugar by Richard Brautigan. The band formed in 2006, and have since been signed to Bad Sneakers Records in Leeds.

In August 2009, the band begun recording their debut album, The Merchant; which was released in November 2010. The first single "23 Fears" was released in December 2008, followed by "Black Heart, Blue Eyes" EP in June 2009, and "Artificial Clouds" in October 2009. "23 Fears" became Steve Lamacq's Record of the Week, and gained well-received attention from Artrocker Magazine, Q Music online and HMV's Get Closer website.

The band have received critically acclaimed reviews and airplay on BBC Radio 1 and XFM through such DJs as Zane Lowe, Colin Murray, John Kennedy and Jon Hillcock.
