= Chapel FM =

Coordinates: 53°49′38″N 1°28′8″W

East Leeds FM

Leeds, West Yorkshire; England
- Broadcast area: East Leeds

History
- First air date: 2003

Links
- Website: www.elfm.co.uk

Chapel FM is an arts centre that runs East Leeds FM, a community radio station based in Leeds, West Yorkshire, England. It initially started in 2003 as East Leeds FM when Heads Together Productions, a Huddersfield-based community arts organisation, worked with local East Leeds high school John Smeaton Academy to form the project. In 2014, they acquired the Seacroft Chapel, an old church, to establish the Chapel FM arts centre, the only one in East Leeds.

The station allows young people from all around East Leeds and interested adults to air broadcasts.
