= Kippax, West Yorkshire =

Town and civil parish in England

Coordinates: 53.7669°N 1.3705°W

Kippax
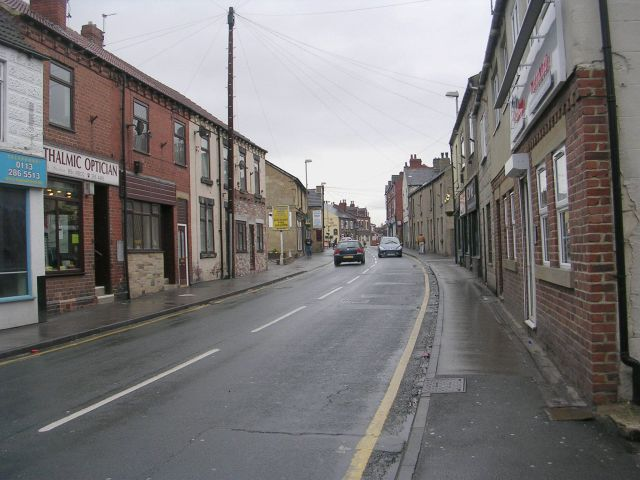
- Kippax High Street, 2008

- Location within West Yorkshire
- Population: 9,785 (2011 census)
- Civil parish: Kippax
- Metropolitan borough: City of Leeds
- Metropolitan county: West Yorkshire
- Region: Yorkshire and the Humber
- Country: England
- Sovereign state: United Kingdom
- Post town: LEEDS
- Postcode district: LS25
- Police: West Yorkshire
- Fire: West Yorkshire
- Ambulance: Yorkshire
- UK Parliament: Selby

Kippax is a town and civil parish in the City of Leeds, West Yorkshire, England. It is situated to the east of the city, near to Garforth and Great Preston.

The Kippax and Methley ward of Leeds City Council is part of the UK Parliament constituency of Selby. The population of Kippax parish at the 2011 census was 9,785. Kippax was a separate civil parish, in Tadcaster Rural District, until 1939, when it was annexed to Garforth. It re-acquired civil parish status and a parish council on 1 April 2004.

== History ==
The name Kippax is of Anglo-Saxon origin and is first attested as Chipesch in the Domesday Book of 1086, and as "Kippeys" in charters from the 1090s to the 1270s, and Kypask and Kypax from the 13th century onwards. The placename seems to be composed of an Anglo-Saxon personal name Cippa (with initial [tʃ-], suggested by the Domesday Book form) or Cyppa (with initial [k-]) + æsc [æʃ] 'ash-tree'. This suggests that the village was first established in a wooded area of ash trees. The pronunciation of the name seems to show Scandinavian influence, perhaps in the change from initial [tʃ-] to [k-], and more clearly in the change of [-æʃ] to [-ask] (and thereafter [-aks]).

Locational surnames such as Kippax developed when former inhabitants of a place moved to another area, usually to seek work, and were best identified by the name of their birthplace. The surname first appears in the late-14th century and other early recordings include: Johannes de Kypax, Johanna Kepas, and Johannes de Kepax, who were all recorded in the Poll Tax Records for Yorkshire in 1379.

The village's historical roots are evidenced by the presence of an originally Anglo-Saxon church which underwent significant modification in Norman times. Typical Saxon herring-bone masonry can be seen in the church tower. Despite being an administrative centre for hundreds of years, the population remained small and it was mostly agricultural until the late-18th century when coal mining began on a small scale in bell pits. The advent of deeper mining and the discovery of coal seams in Allerton Bywater saw Kippax undergo a rapid expansion into a typical northern mining community in the 19th century.

Exploitation of the coal led to a railway being built between Garforth and Castleford in 1873. The single line had two intermediate stations at Kippax and Ledston. It was closed to passengers in 1951. The decline in deep mining saw Allerton Bywater pit close in the 1990s having been in decline since the 1970s.

Kippax adjusted to its new status as a commuter village. Its proximity to the A1/M1/M62 means that many residents now commute to Leeds, Castleford, London, Wakefield or York. The high street has a mix of independent butchers, grocers and newsagents and a small co-op store.

== Sport and notable people ==
The village is the home of the Kippax Welfare rugby league club. Its first team plays as the Kippax Knights.

Musician Robert Harvey, of the band The Music, is from Kippax.

== Gallery ==
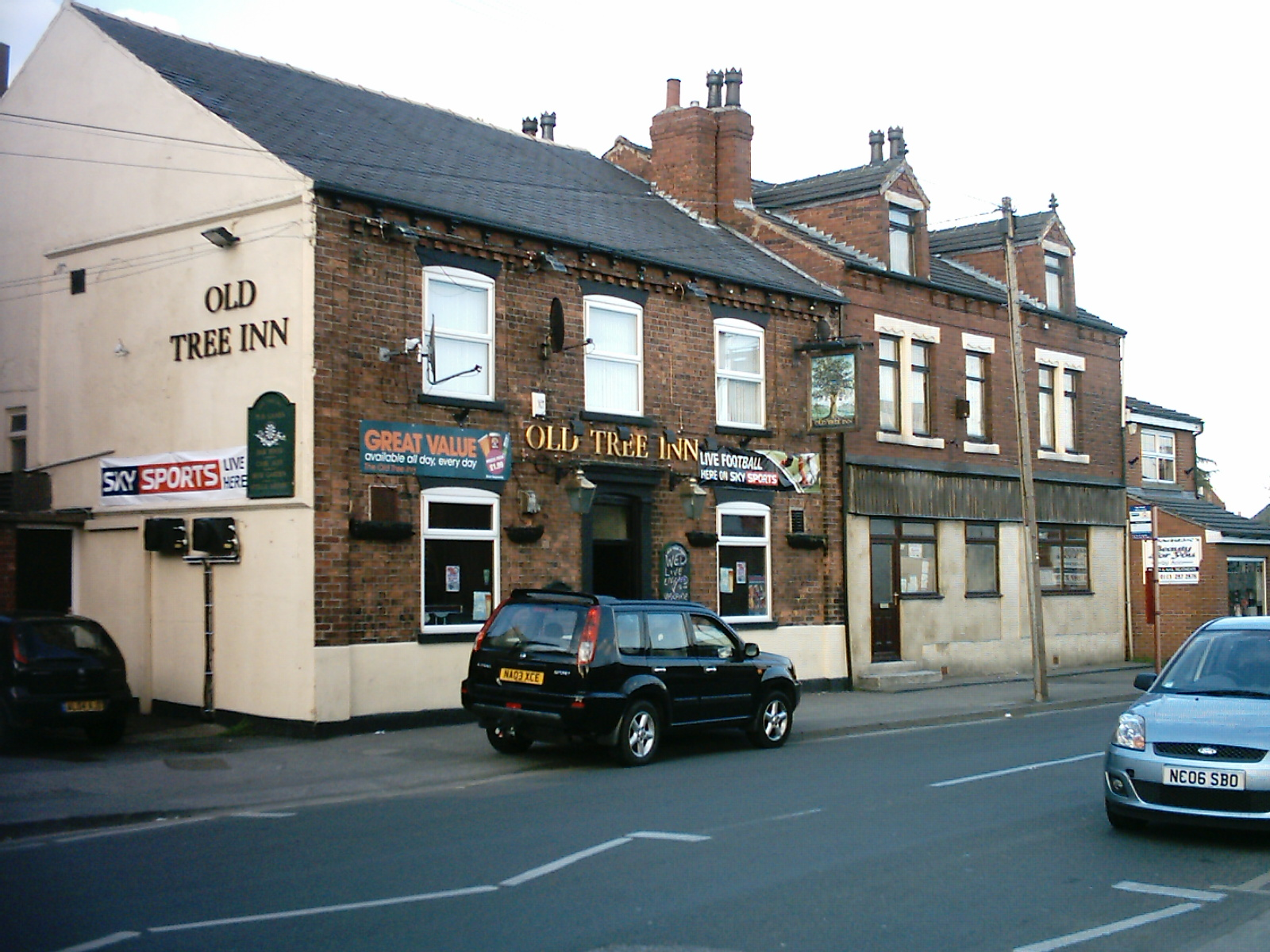
The Old Tree Inn

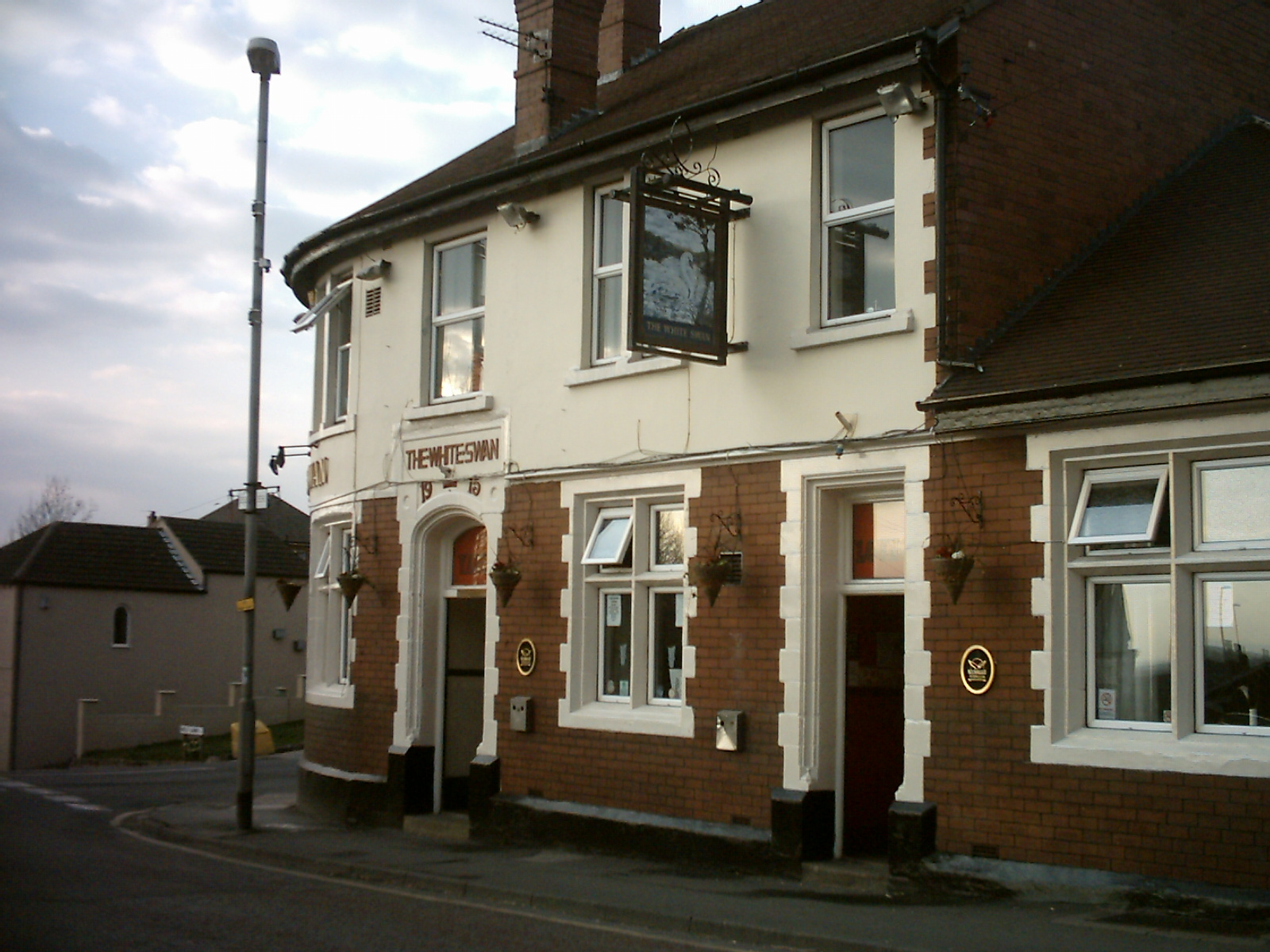
The White Swan

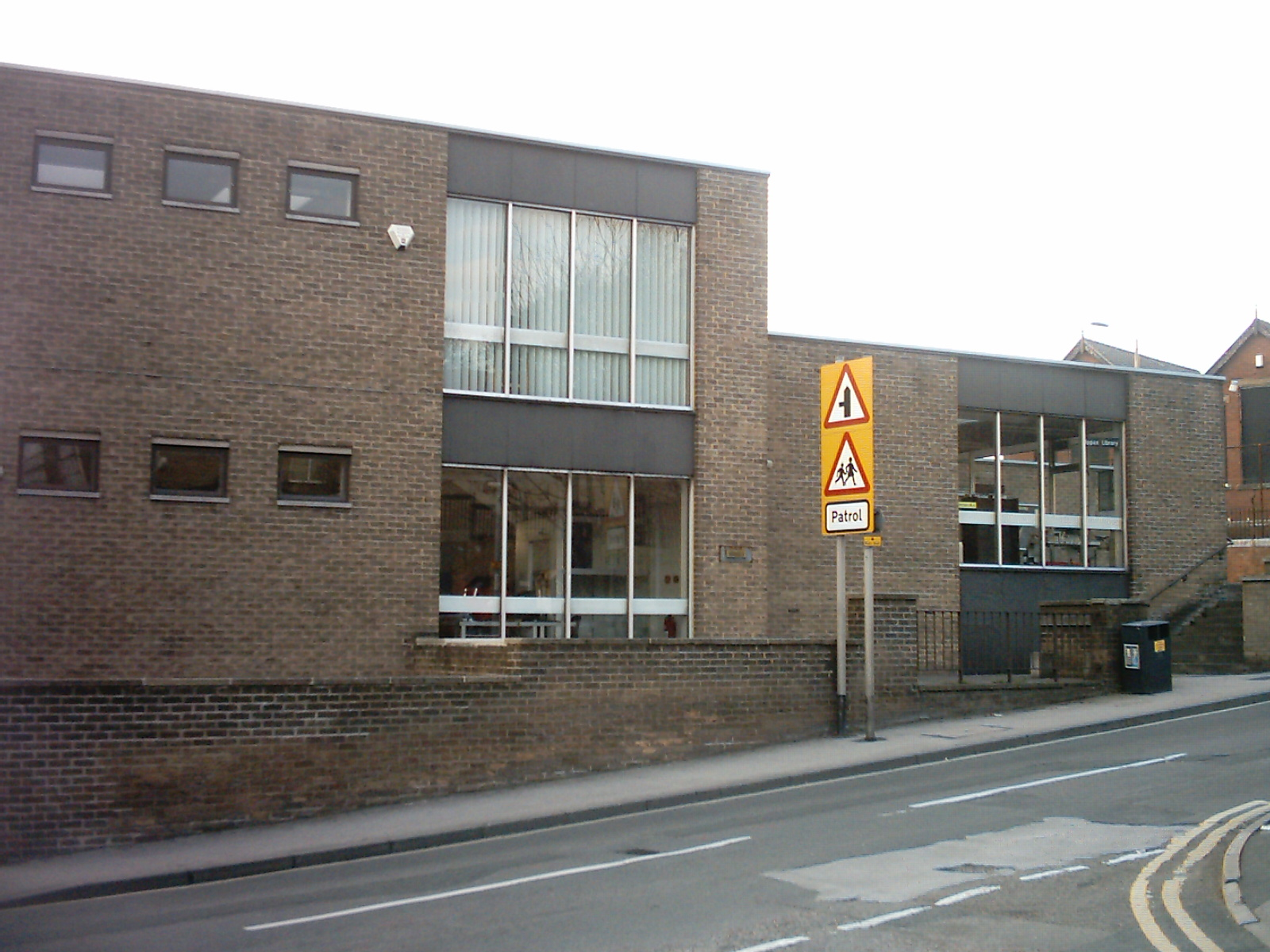
Kippax Library

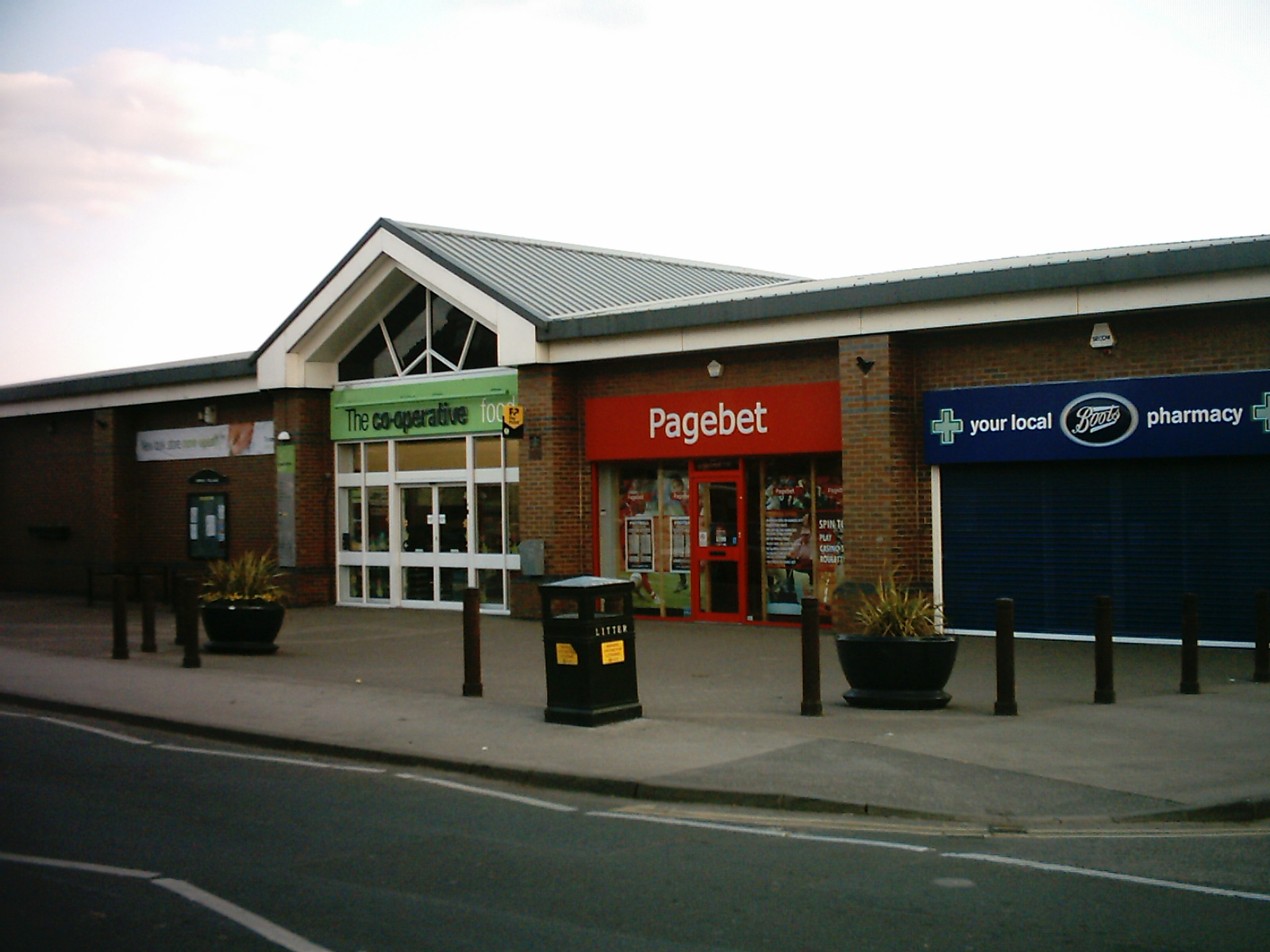
Co-op

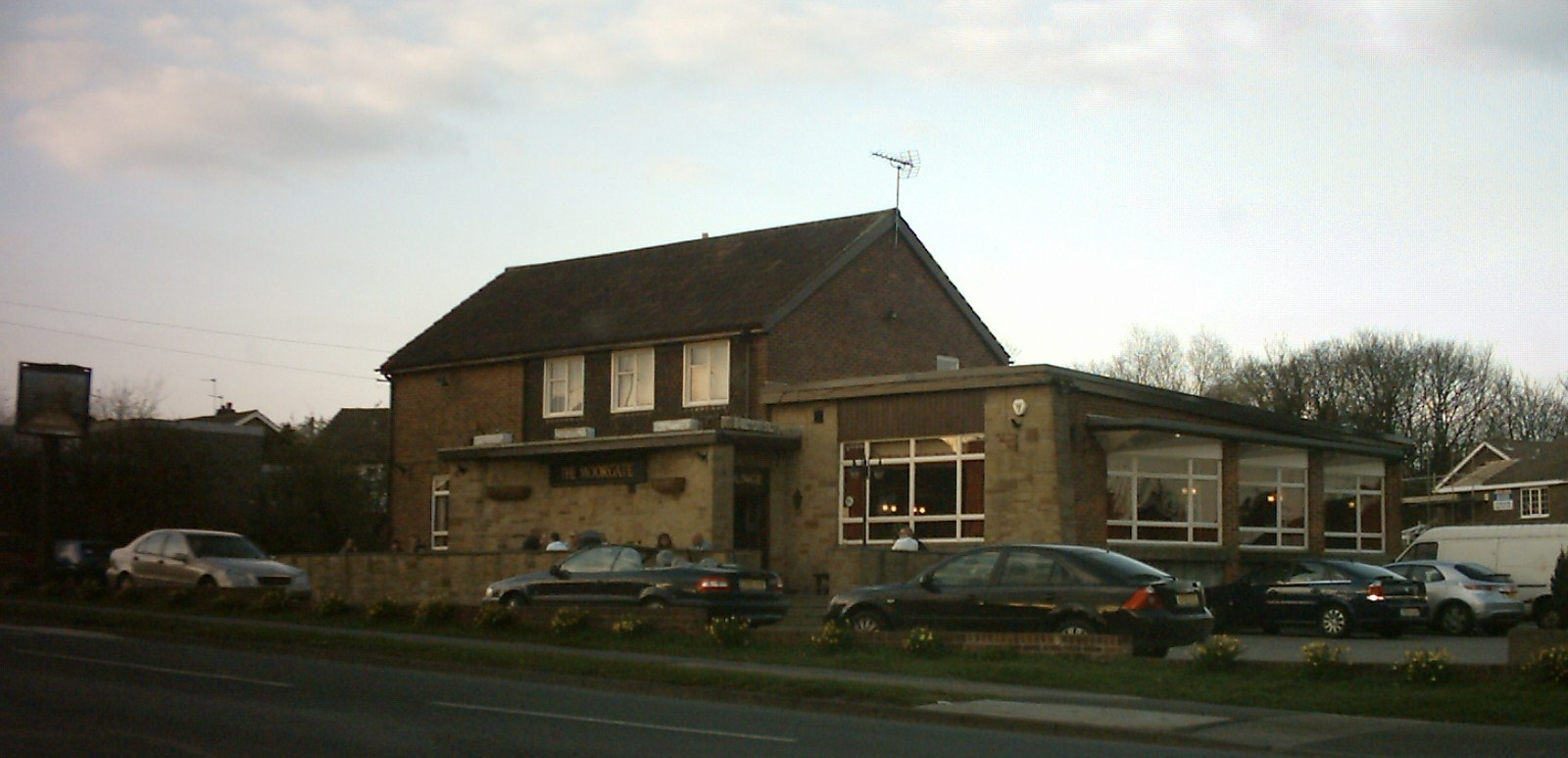
The Moorgate

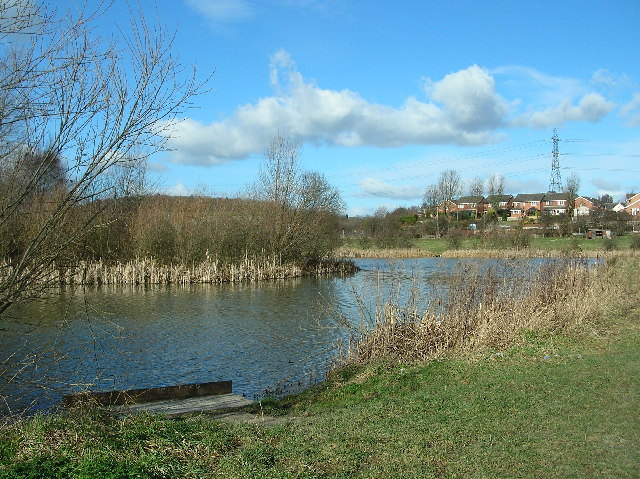
Fishing ponds in Kippax

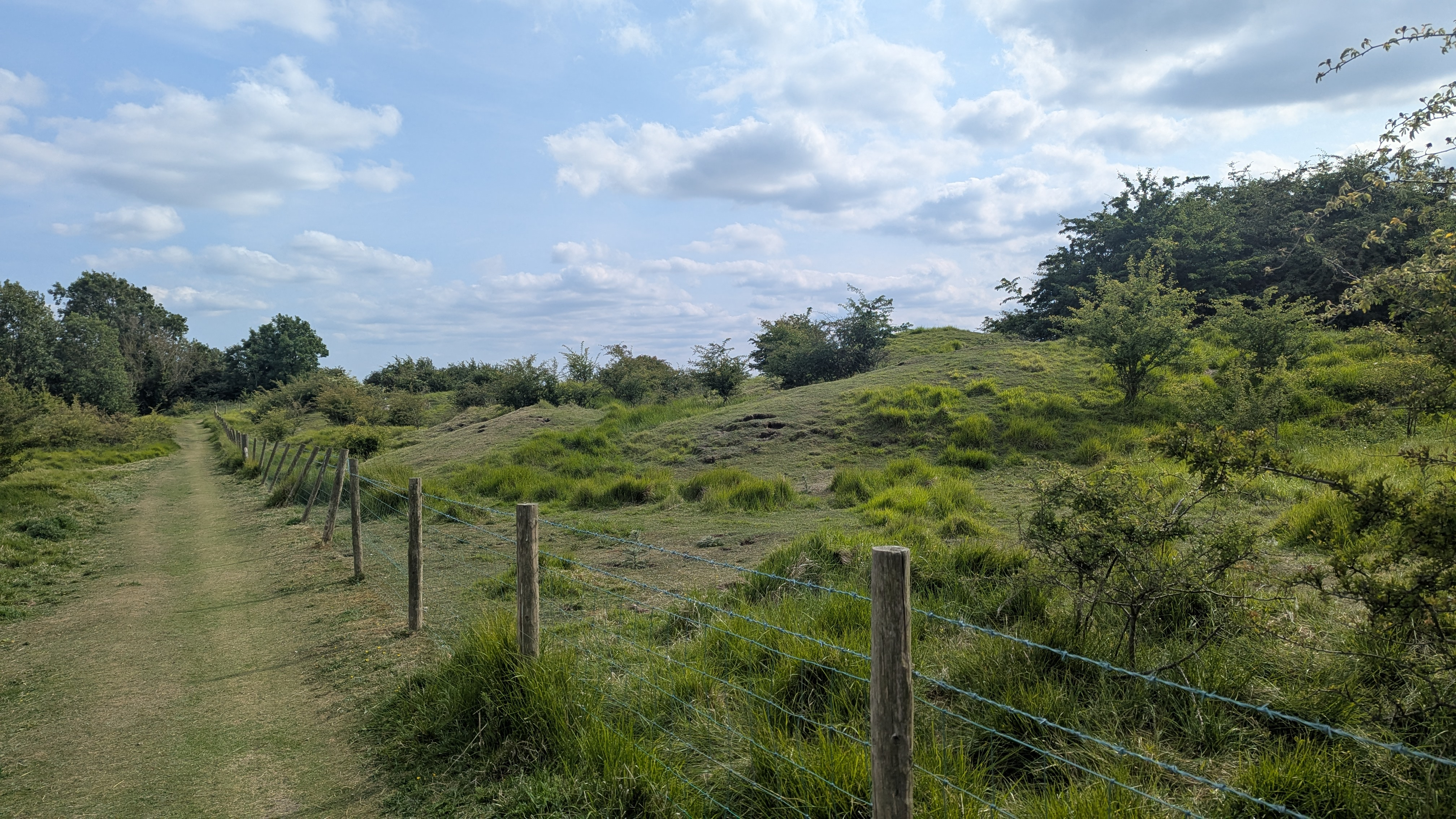
Roach Lime Hills SSSI

== See also ==
- Listed buildings in Kippax, West Yorkshire
