= Garforth railway station =

Railway station in West Yorkshire, England

Garforth
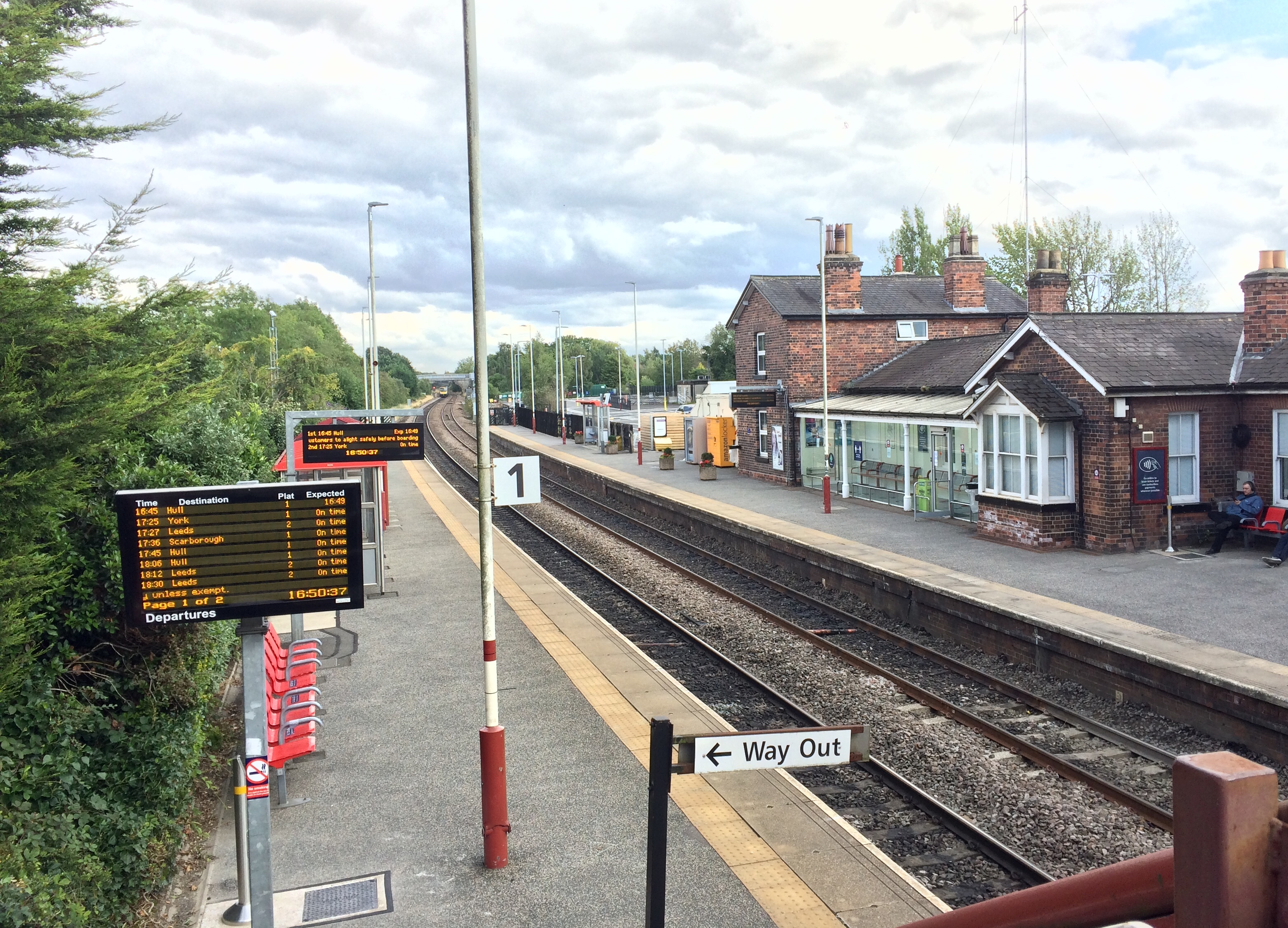
- Garforth station platforms from the footbridge, 2020

General information
- Location: Garforth, City of Leeds, England
- Coordinates: 53.7966°N 1.3824°W
- Grid reference: SE407335
- Managed by: Northern Trains
- Transit authority: West Yorkshire Metro
- Platforms: 2

Other information
- Station code: GRF
- Fare zone: 2
- Classification: DfT category E

History
- Opened: 1834

Passengers
- 2020/21: ▼0.114 million
- 2021/22: ▲0.345 million
- 2022/23: ▲0.425 million
- 2023/24: ▲0.488 million
- 2024/25: ▲0.561 million
Location
Notes
- Passenger statistics from the Office of Rail and Road

Garforth is one of two railway stations serving the town of Garforth, in West Yorkshire, England; the other is East Garforth, 0.5 miles (800 m) to the east. Garforth is on the Selby Line, 7.1 miles (11.5 km) east of Leeds and 16 miles (26 km) south-west of York. The station is managed by Northern Trains, which also operates services along with TransPennine Express.

== History ==
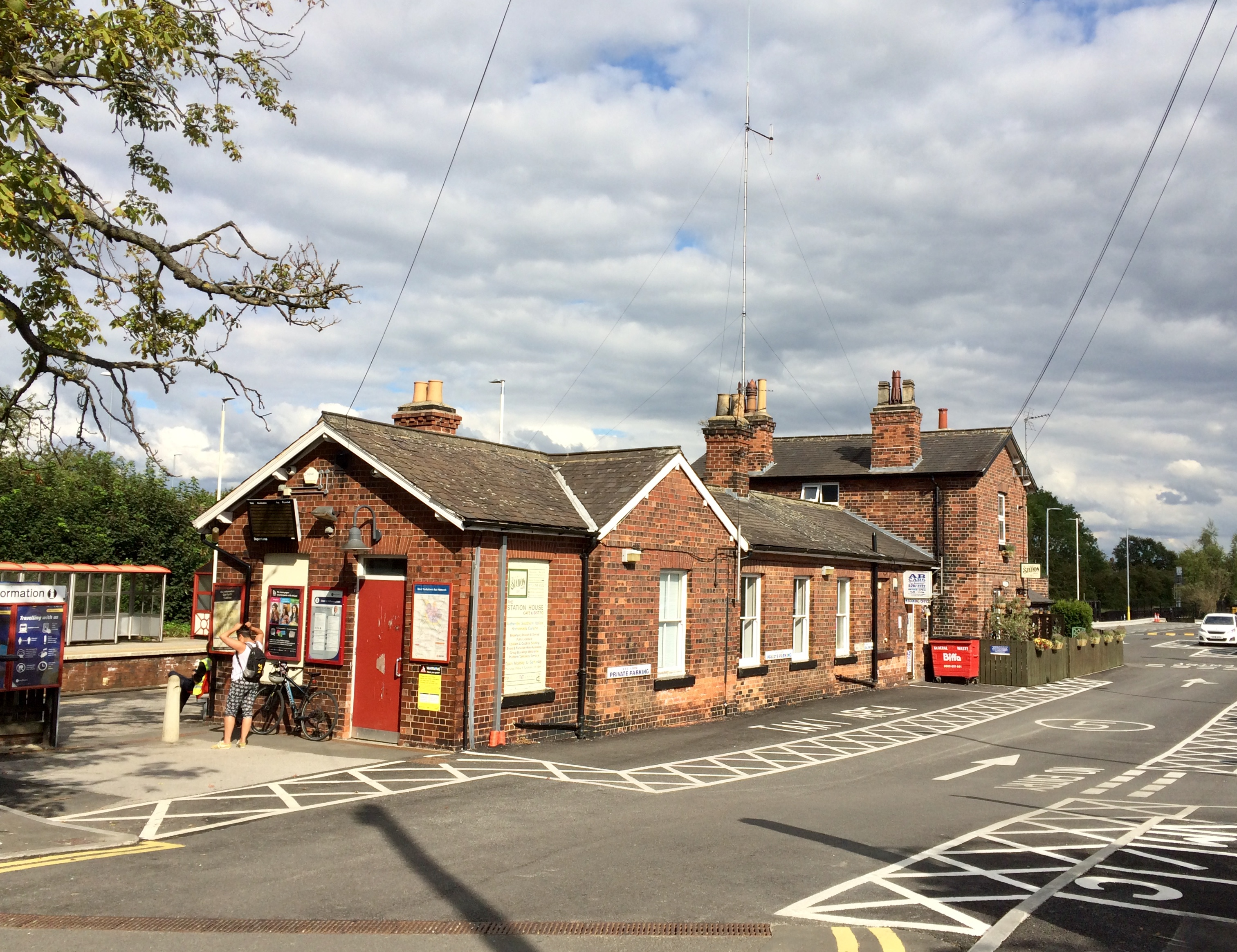
The main station building

The station was originally opened by the Leeds and Selby Railway in 1834. The road bridge crosses the line at an oblique angle; this was considered something of a marvel at the time of construction. The station then linked the town with the former Leeds Marsh Lane station. The current buildings date from 1872 and were designed by North Eastern Railway architect Thomas Prosser.

Garforth station also connected with the privately owned Aberford Railway (known locally as the "fly line" or simply "the lines") which closed in 1924; it is now a public path commonly used for horses, dog walkers and travelling to and from Garforth Academy. East of the station was the junction to the branch line to Castleford, via Ledston, which closed to passengers in 1951 and completely in the 1990s.

In 2015, additional shelters were placed on both platforms, doubling the sheltered capacity.

In July 2023, the footbridge, connecting both platforms to Aberford Road, was closed and demolished, for the new replacement bridge to be built. The new bridge will be built by April 2024 in the same spot, and will include lifts. This was done in order to install new overhead wires and to include step free access on to the platforms and Aberford Road.

The footbridge was transported to Bredgar & Wormshill Light Railway in Kent.

== Facilities ==
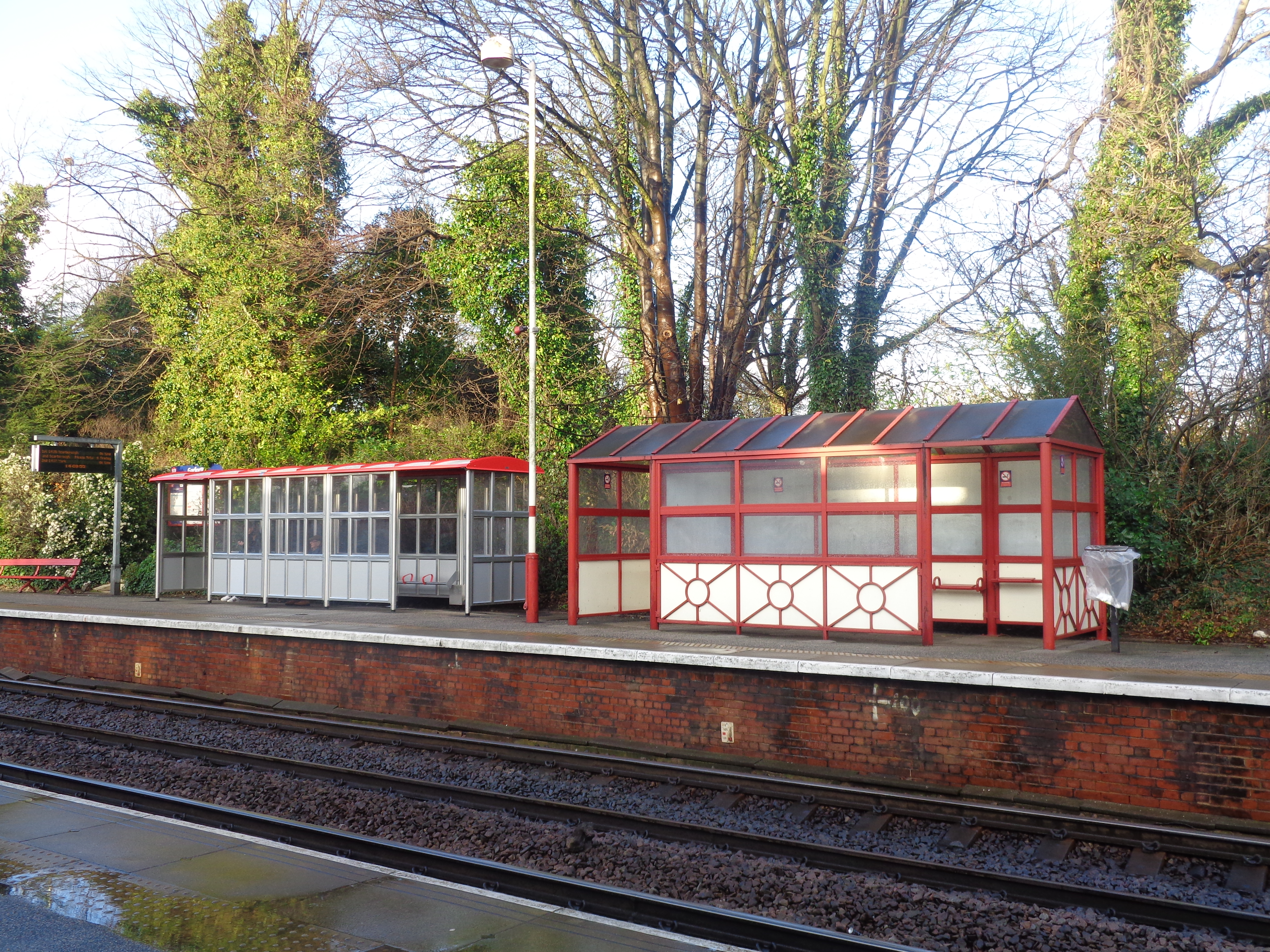
Waiting shelters on platform 1

The station buildings are concentrated on the Leeds bound platform, which is disabled accessible (the opposite platform can only be accessed via a footbridge).

There is a ticket office (open 06:00–14:00 Mondays to Saturdays) and waiting room in the buildings; the remaining space is leased out to a taxi company. The Leeds bound platform also has an automatic ticket machine that can be used out of hours and a vending machine. As well as the heated waiting room on the Leeds-bound platform, there are two shelters available for use out of office hours. The York-bound platform has two passenger shelters.

The two platforms are connected by a footbridge with stepped access, this also links to Aberford Road. The station has a large car park which is free for passenger use. There is CCTV and lighting throughout the station and car park. Refreshments can purchased from the Station House Café, which is situated on the Leeds-bound platform (2).

== Services ==
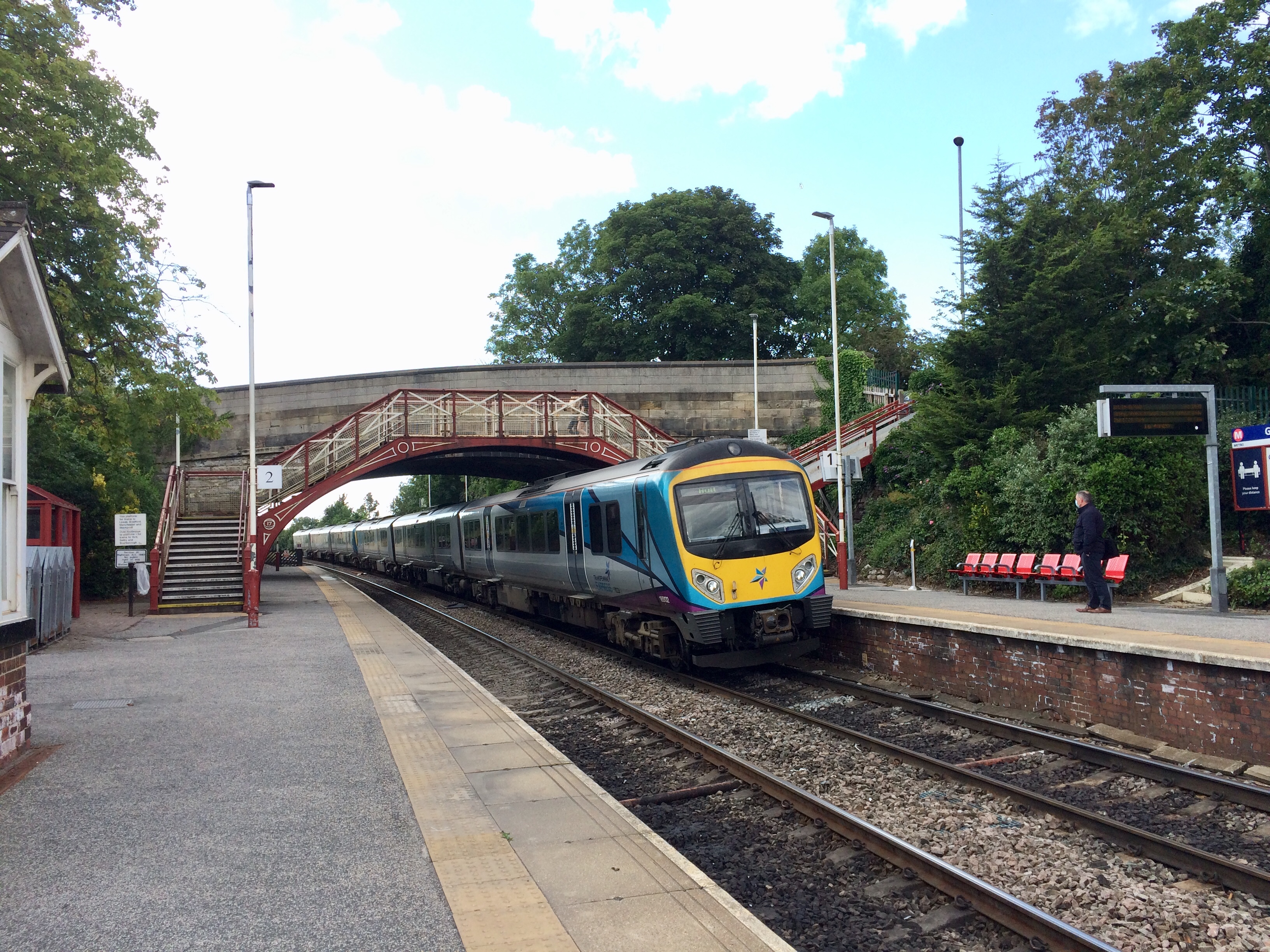
A TransPennine Express Class 185 calling at the station, 2020

Garforth is served by two train operating companies, which provide the following general service in trains per hour/day (tph/tpd):

Northern Trains:

- 2 tph to Halifax, via Leeds; of which:
  - 1 tph continues to Blackpool North, via Preston
- 1 tph to Leeds
- 2 tph to York
- 1 tph to Hull, via Selby.

TransPennine Express: These trains only stop here in the morning and evening peak periods.

- 4 tpd to Manchester Victoria, via Leeds; of which:
  - 3 tpd continue to Liverpool Lime Street
- 3 tpd to Redcar Central; of which:
  - 1 tpd continue to Saltburn
- 1 tpd to Hull, via Selby.

Preceding station	National Rail	Following station
Leeds	TransPennine Express; North TransPennine	York
Cross Gates	Northern; Selby Line	East Garforth
	Disused railways	
Cross Gates	North Eastern Railway; Castleford–Garforth line	Kippax

== Onward connections ==
The station has a taxi office, with the rank directly outside the main buildings.

Buses serve the station on Aberford Road, to which there is a direct link from the station's footbridge; they also operate nearby from Main Street, a short walk away.

== Gallery ==
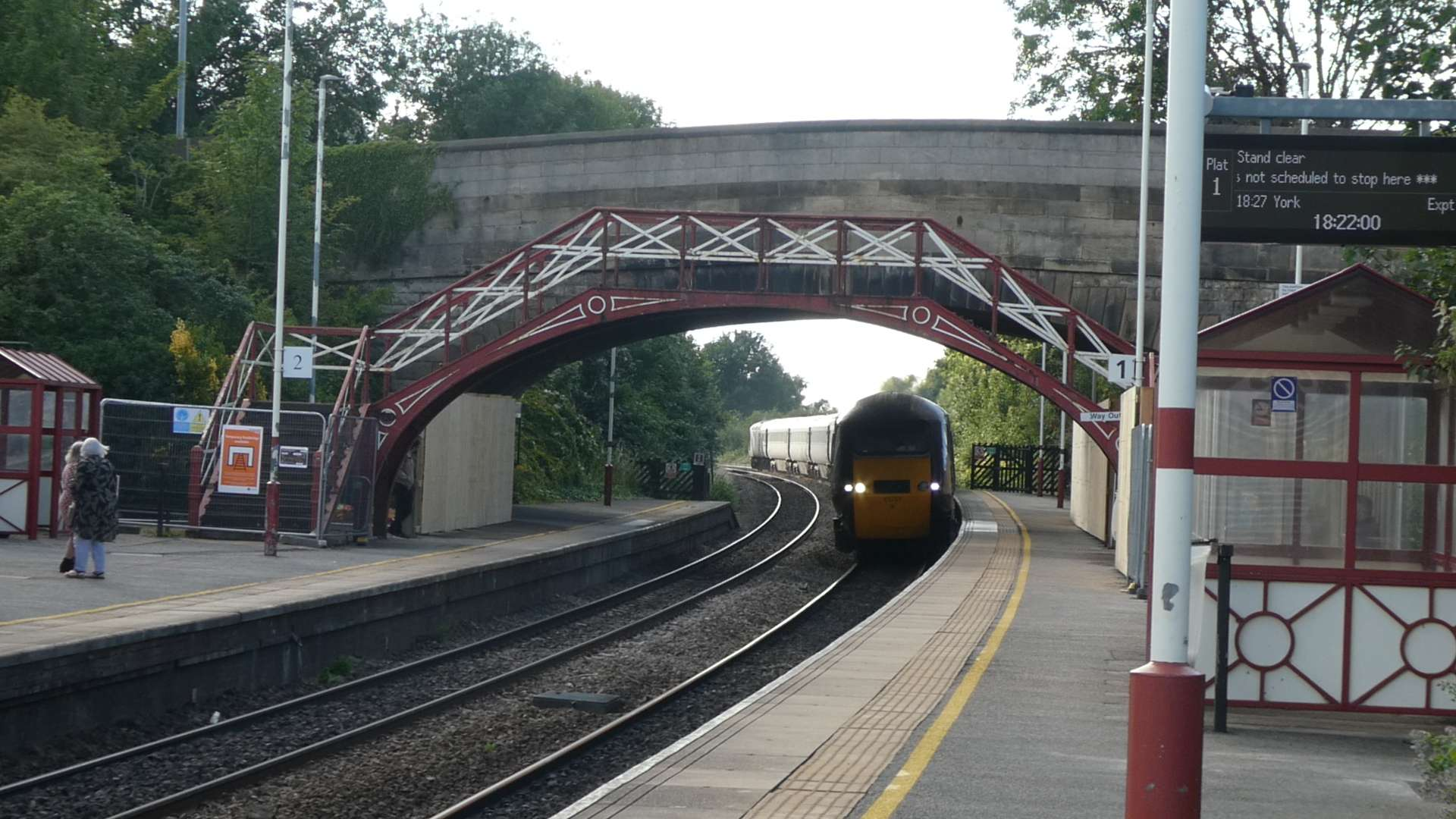
An InterCity 125 passing by Garforth station; pictured when the footbridge was just closed, before demolition

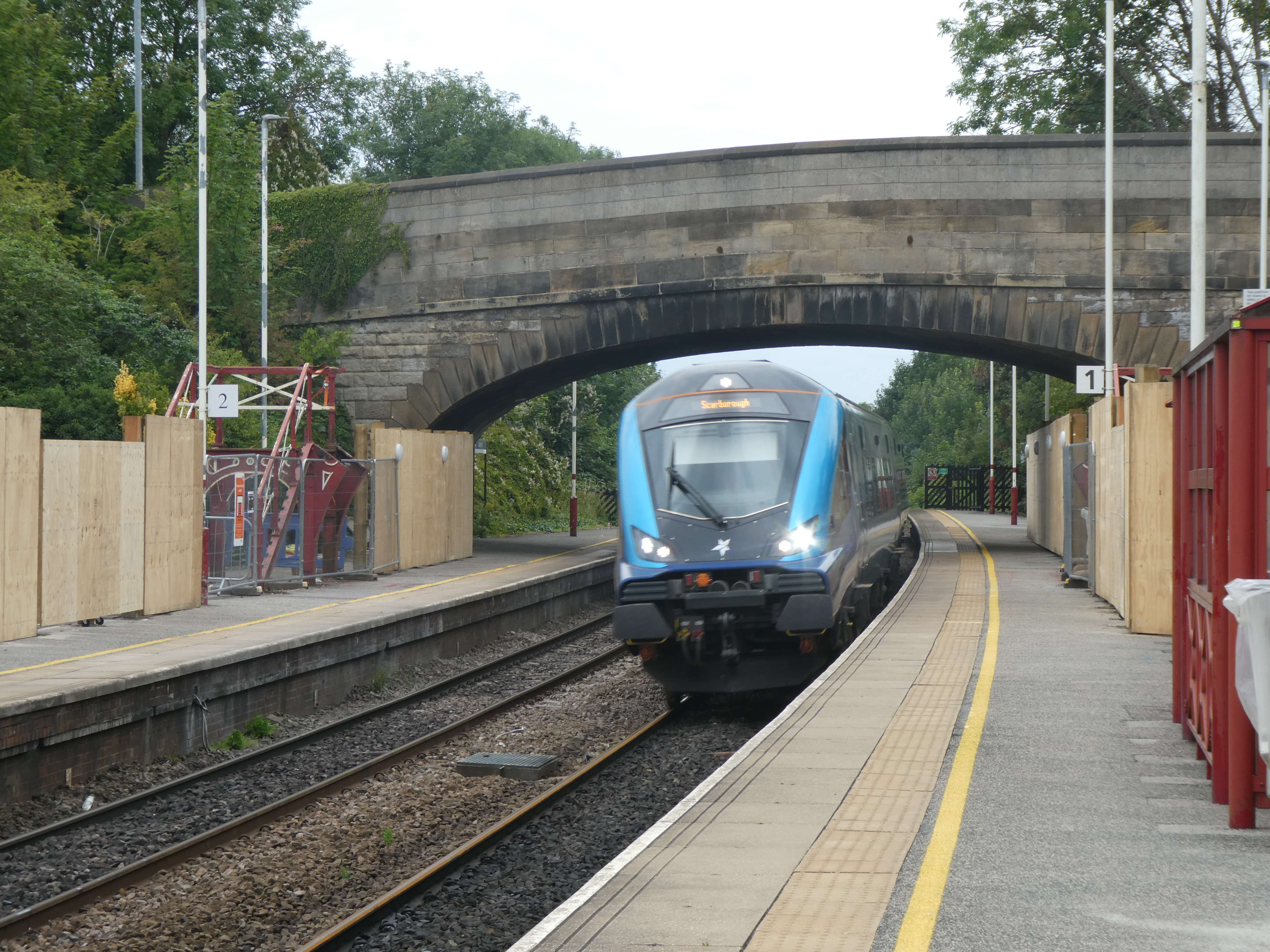
A TransPennine Express Mark 5A set bound for Scarborough; pictured when the footbridge was partially demolished

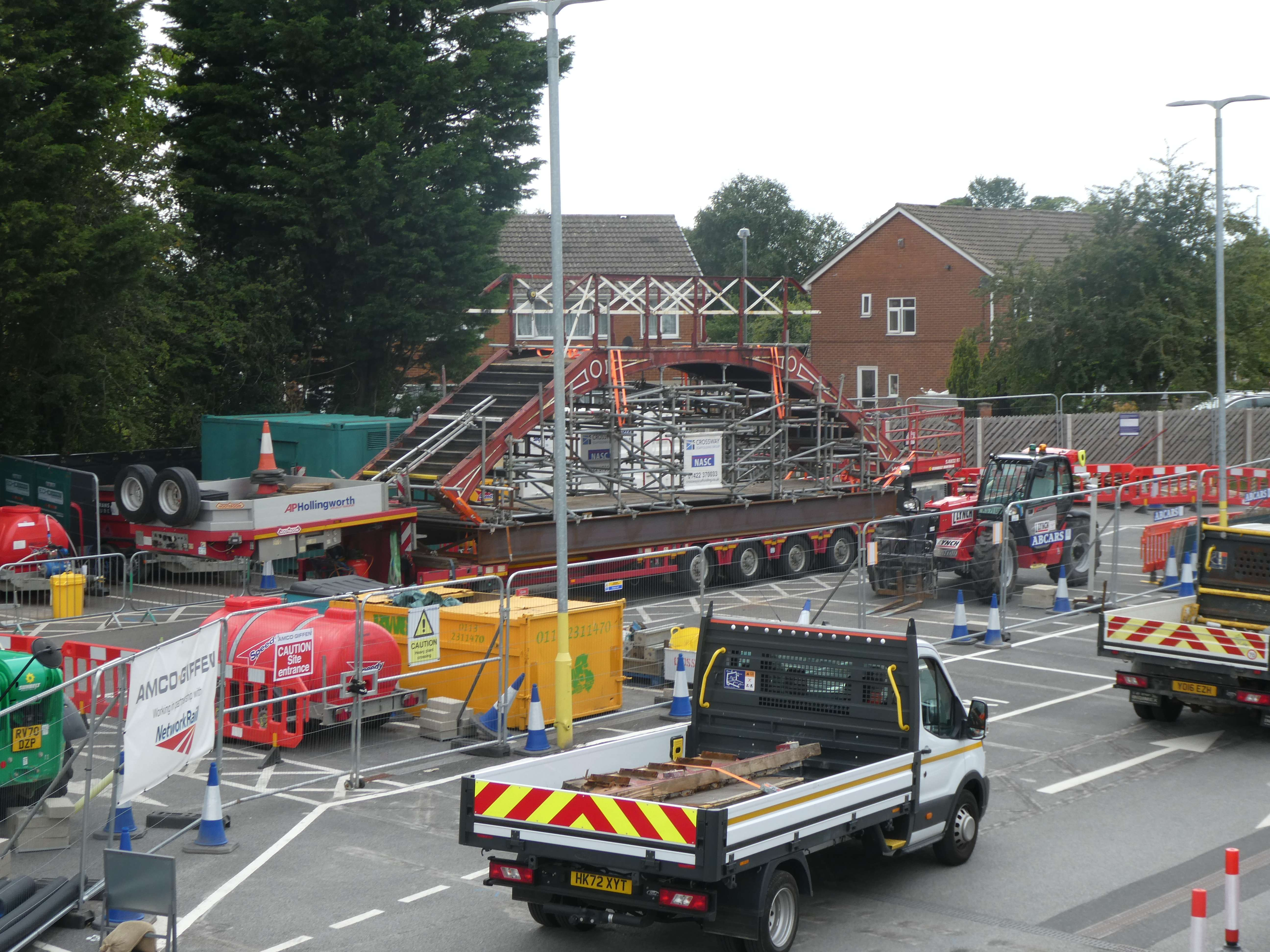
A demolished footbridge waiting to be transported to the Bredgar & Wormshill Light Railway

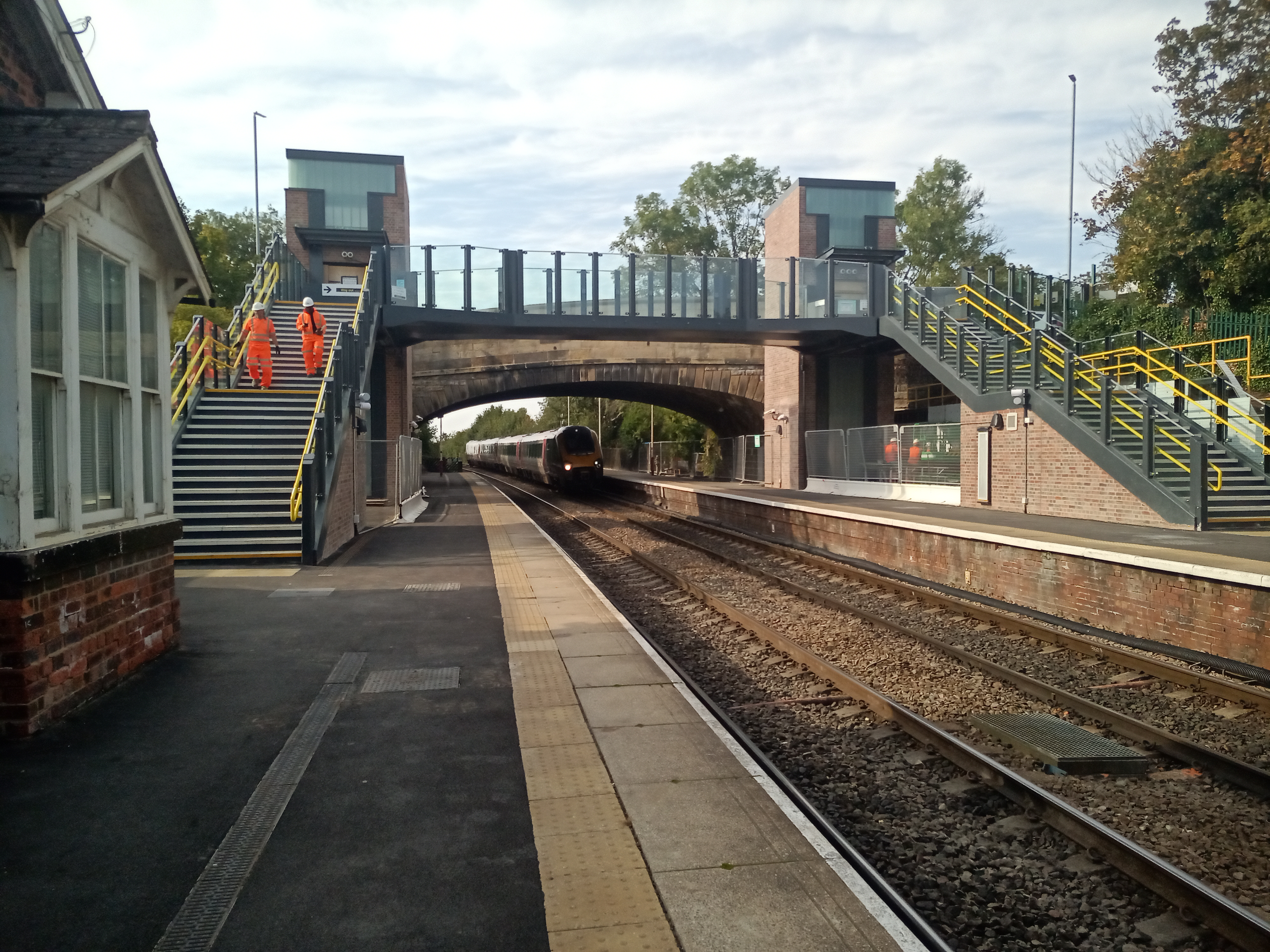
The new footbridge at Garforth in 2024
