= Castleford–Garforth line =

Railway line in the UK

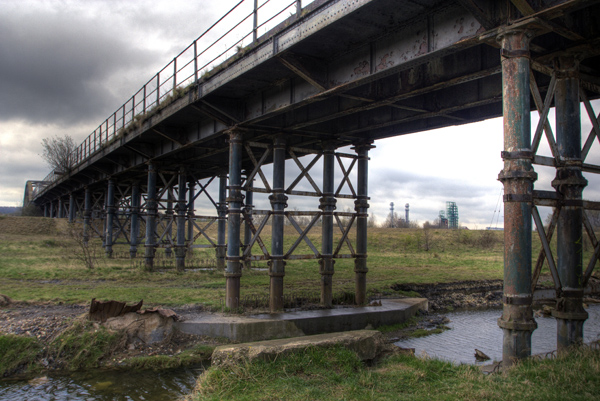
- Castleford Viaduct across the River Aire

Overview
- Status: Closed
- Locale: West Yorkshire, England
- Termini: Garforth; Castleford
- Stations: 5

Service
- Type: Heavy rail
- Operator(s): North Eastern Railway; London North Eastern Railway; British Rail

History
- Opened: 8 April 1878
- Closed: 1998 (complete closure)

Technical
- Line length: 6.3 mi (10.1 km)
- Number of tracks: 1
- Track gauge: 1,435 mm (4 ft 8 1/2 in) standard gauge

The Castleford–Garforth line was a single-track railway line in West Yorkshire, England, connecting Castleford with Garforth east of Leeds. The route was developed to allow coal to be transported from the area, though a passenger service was operated between 1878 and 1951. Initially promoted by Leeds, Castleford and Pontefract Junction Railway, it was taken over by the North Eastern Railway (NER) before the line was completed.

== Route ==
Diagram of the Castleford–Garforth line (click to expand) Extant line Closed line

Castleford had an existing station on the York and North Midland Railway, already established by 1848.

The line left the route of the York and North Midland Railway at Castleford East Junction, turning north and crossing Wheldon Road on a plate girder bridge. Curving north-west, it crossed the River Aire east of its junction with the Aire and Calder Navigation on Castleford Viaduct, a long iron bridge. After a level crossing with Ings Lane and passing under Barnsdale Road, it reached Ledston, east of the A656 near Allerton Bywater, with a connection to Allerton Bywater colliery. The line continued along the northern edge of Allerton Bywater. Bowers was situated about one mile northwest of Ledston station, Kippax another three quarters of a mile further, near today's Berry Lane east of Great Preston. From there, the line continued north for about 2 miles (3 km), passed under the A63 road, and curved in a wide S-bend towards the tracks of the Leeds and Selby Railway, crossing Ninelands Lane and joining the main line in a trailing junction immediately east of Garforth station.

From a junction north of Bowers, a branch of the line led west towards an opencast mine which is now the place of St Aidan's country park. It served several collieries in the area between Swillington, Astley, and Allerton Bywater.

The length of the line between Castleford East Junction and Garforth was 6.3 miles (10.1 km). Trains between Castleford station and Garforth covered a distance of approximately 7 miles (11 km).

== History ==
Leeds, Castleford, and Pontefract Junction Railway Act 1873
- Act of Parliament
- Parliament of the United Kingdom
- Long title: An Act to incorporate a Company for making the Leeds, Castleford, and Pontefract Junction Railway; and for other purposes.
- Citation: 36 & 37 Vict. c. clxxvi

Dates
- Royal assent: 21 July 1873

Text of statute as originally enacted

Leeds, Castleford and Pontefract Junction Railway Act 1874
- Act of Parliament
- Parliament of the United Kingdom
- Long title: An Act to empower the Leeds, Castleford, and Pontefract Junction Railway Company to make additional Railways and to abandon portions of their authorised Railways; and for other purposes.
- Citation: 37 & 38 Vict. c. xxxviii

Dates
- Royal assent: 30 June 1874

Text of statute as originally enacted

The construction of the line was authorised by the Leeds, Castleford, and Pontefract Junction Railway Act 1873 (36 & 37 Vict. c. clxxvi). Originally built by the Leeds, Castleford and Pontefract Junction Railway (LC&PJR), prior to its opening in 1878 it was absorbed into the NER by the North Eastern Railway Company's Act 1876 (39 & 40 Vict. c. cii).

Passenger trains between Castleford and Garforth continued from and to Leeds, serving also the intermediate stations between Garforth and Leeds. Whilst the NER supplied six to seven trains per day at the start, the LNER reduced the service to five trains per day which after nationalisation had become as little as three per day. All local passenger trains were stopped in January 1951, but excursions and diverted passenger trains continued until 1969.

Whilst the line served a sparse population, its original intended purpose of moving coal kept it in traffic until the 1990s. Coal was forwarded out from Allerton Bywater, Allerton Main, Kippax, Lowther and Primrose Hill Collieries. Since 1958, Bowers Disposal Point was the forwarding location for coal mined from the St Aidan's opencast venture. One other coal mine, Trench Colliery, was located near to Garforth and its siding faced north, so that it only traversed a small section of the line. Trench Colliery closed down in 1930 and all freight traffic between Garforth and Ledston ended on 14 July 1969.

In the 1980s, spoil from Wheldale Colliery was taken to the tips at Allerton Bywater. This service used National Coal Board (NCB) locomotives with NCB drivers who were qualified to drive on the BR owned branch. These trains ceased in 1987 with the closure of Wheldale. About 1 1/2 miles (2.4 km) of track were retained from Castleford East Junction to Ledston to serve Allerton Bywater Colliery and Bowers Row Disposal Point, and later RJB Mining's Ledston Unloading Hopper Compound. These services ended on 6 June 1998.

In 2009 there were reports that Network Rail considered reopening the line to run more services between Castleford and Leeds, but the costs were considered prohibitive given the low population numbers.

== Structures ==
The major structure of the line is the 840-foot-long (260 m) Castleford Viaduct over the River Aire. It has a bow string centre section with two long plate girder approach spans, supported by sets of tubular steel piers (nine on the southern side, ten on the northern). Due to corrosion, it is in poor condition. A plate girder bridge led the line across Wheldon Road in Castleford. This was demolished in the 2000s to remove a highway height restriction, while the bridges over Brecks Lane (west of Kippax) and over Ninelands Lane were removed after closure (exact dates unknown).

== Status of the line ==
The tracks north of Ledston have been lifted, and the line has been partly overbuilt in Garforth. About 4 miles (6.4 km) of the line between Silkstone Square in Allerton Bywater and Ninelands Lane on Garforth are now used as a bridleway, known as the Lines Way, as is a 3/4-mile (1.2 km) long section of the colliery branch west of Bowers. The intermediate stations have been demolished.

== Gallery ==
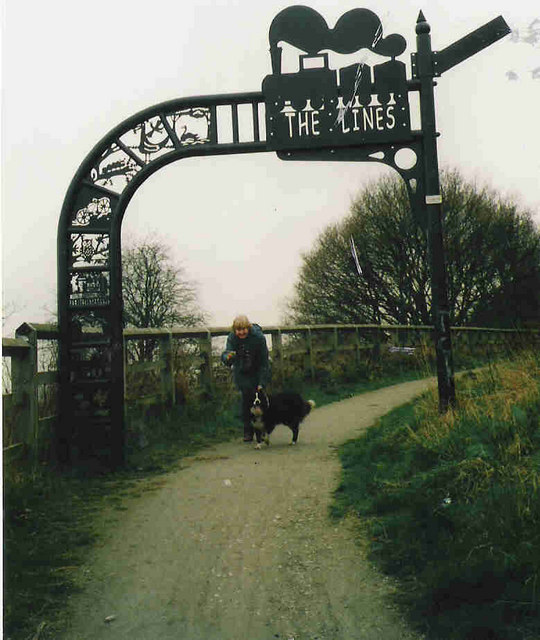
Footpath following the former railway line in Allerton Bywater

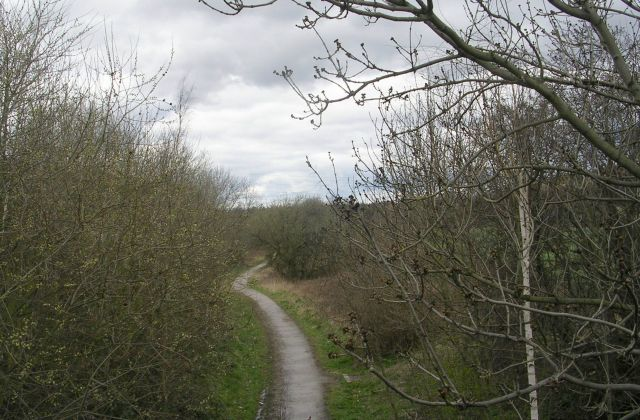
Footpath on the former railway line in Great Preston

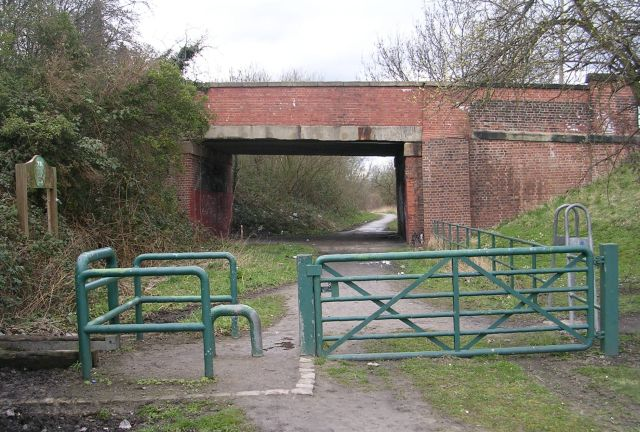
Bridge of Station Lane, Great Preston, across the former railway line

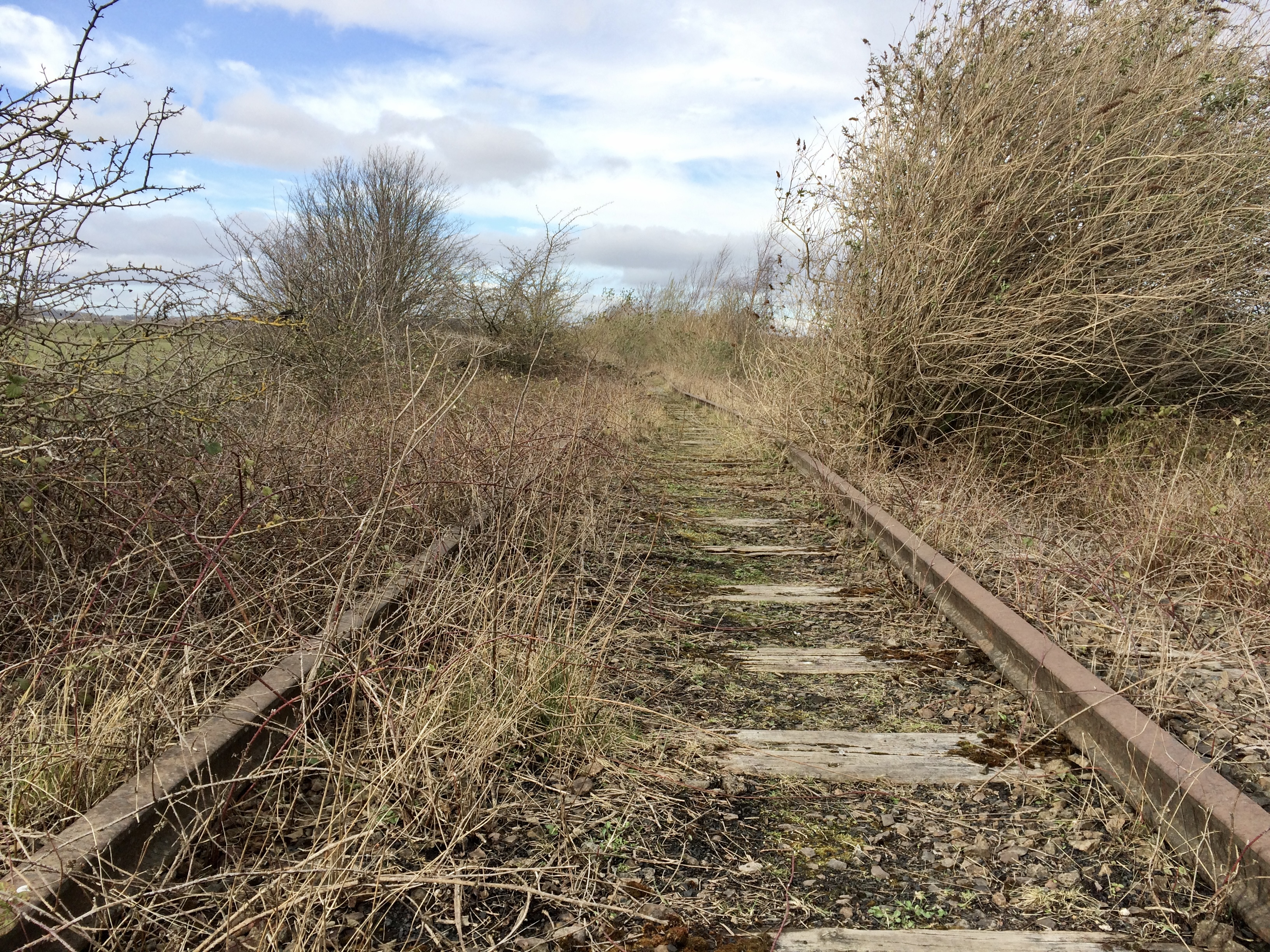
Abandoned track remaining at the southern end of the line in Castleford
