= Kippax railway station =

Disused railway station in West Yorkshire, England

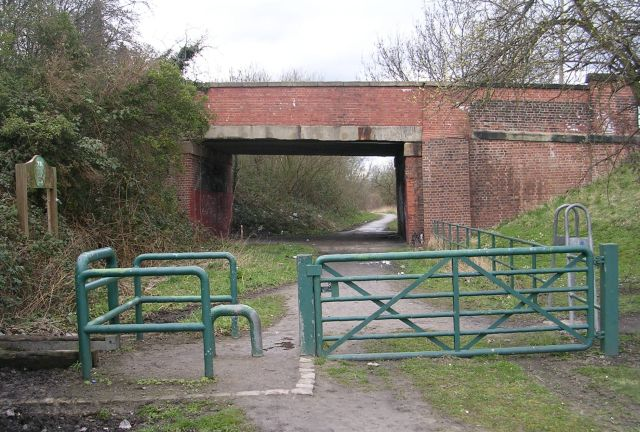
- Station Lane, Great Preston, looking north. The station was on the right hand side.

General information
- Location: Kippax, City of Leeds; England
- Coordinates: 53.7614°N 1.3868°W
- Grid reference: SE405296
- Platforms: 1

Other information
- Status: Disused

History
- Original company: North Eastern Railway
- Pre-grouping: North Eastern Railway
- Post-grouping: London and North Eastern Railway

Key dates
- 8 April 1878: Opened to goods
- 4 April 1878: Opened to passengers
- 22 January 1951: Closed to passengers
- 30 September 1963: Closed to goods
Location

Kippax railway station was a railway station on the Castleford–Garforth line in West Yorkshire, England. The station opened in 1878 and closed to passengers in 1951, although the line remained open for a further 18 years for diversions and goods traffic.

== History ==
The station was on the western edge of Kippax village adjacent to the hamlet of Great Preston. Like all the other stations on the line, it had just one platform on the eastern side of the line. The station opened to passengers in August 1878, but had opened to goods traffic four months earlier. As with other sections of the line, the station did not possess a passing loop, though trains could pass in the freight loop that led into the goods yard.

In 1880, the station's water tower was used to supply fresh water to the people living in and around the station area (Great Preston). An outbreak of fever, diphtheria and diarrhoea in previous years had led to the railway company providing fresher water than that already afforded to the locals. The tower, which was situated on the main platform, was not fitted with an apparatus to transfer water to locomotives.

The station had a goods shed to the south of the platform; its design was the same as the one provided at Ledston. The chief export from Kippax was aggregate; a local quarry had a siding just to the north of the station. Kippax was the busiest station on the line as it served a larger and well established village. In 1911, 44,000 tickets were issued compared to Ledston's 15,000.

The station closed to passengers in January 1951, with closure to goods in September 1963. No trace of the station remains, though the trackbed has been converted into a cycleway.

Preceding station	Disused railways	Following station
Garforth; Line closed, station open	North Eastern Railway; Castleford–Garforth line	Bowers; Line and station closed
