= Castleford bus station =

Bus station in West Yorkshire, England

Castleford
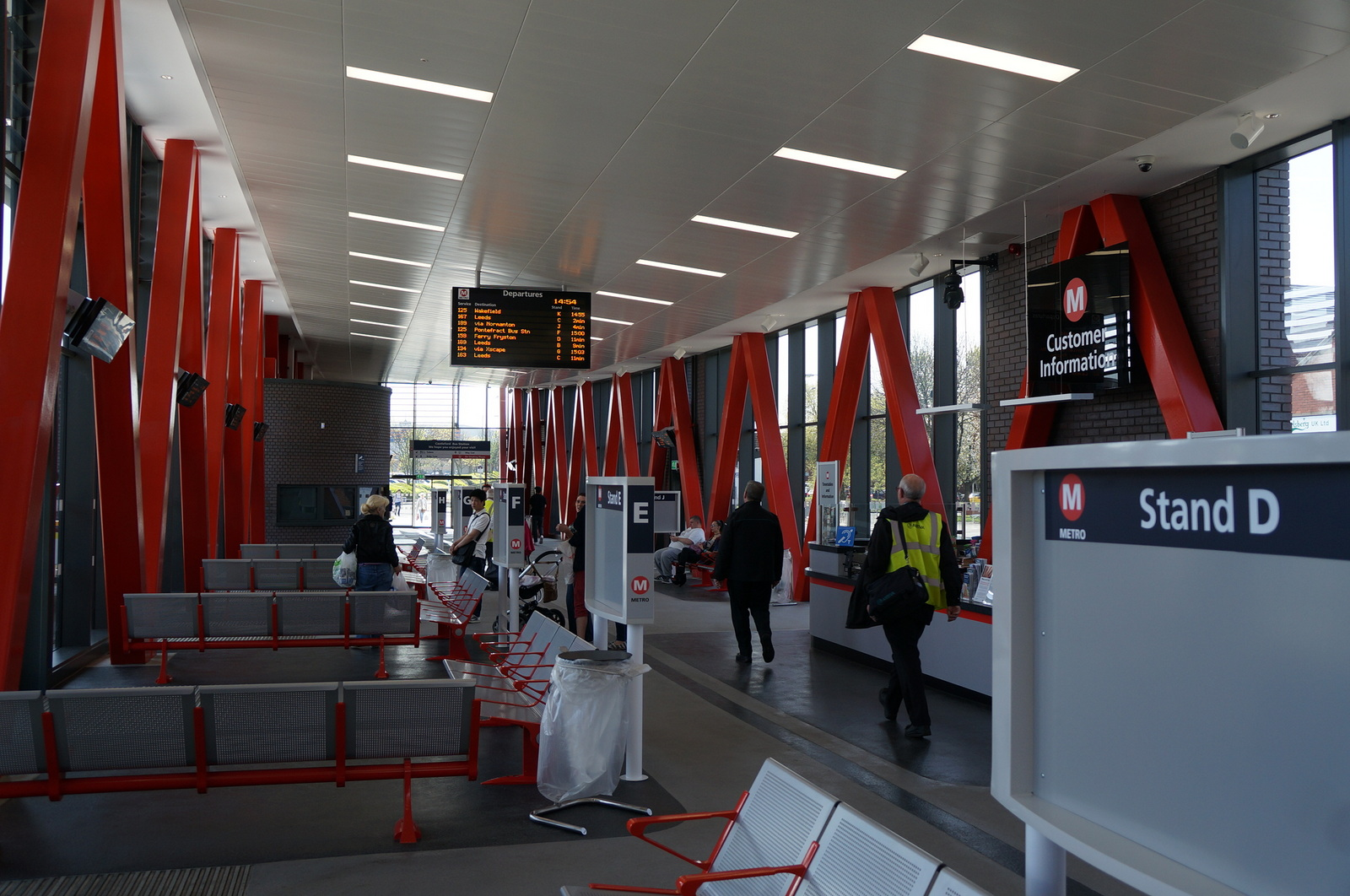

General information
- Location: Albion Street, Castleford; City of Wakefield
- Coordinates: 53.7247°N 1.3572°W
- Operator: West Yorkshire Metro
- Bus stands: 10
- Bus operators: Arriva Yorkshire
- Connections: Castleford railway station (110 yards [100 m])

History
- Opened: May 1963, Reopened February 2015.
Location

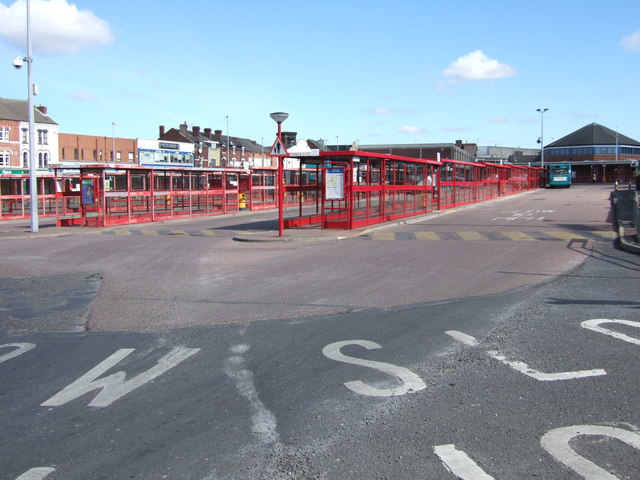
Castleford Bus Station seen in March 2007, prior to rebuilding

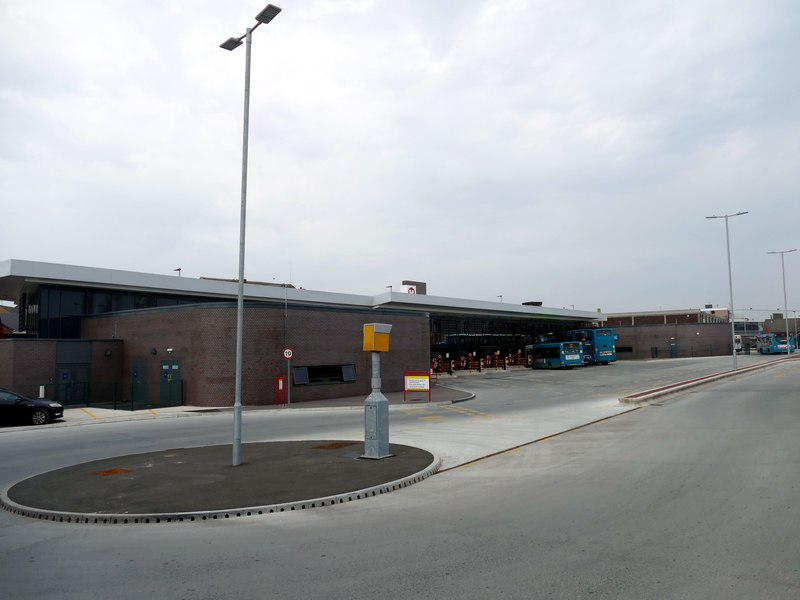
The rebuilt bus station

Castleford Bus Station serves the town of Castleford, West Yorkshire, England. The bus station is owned and managed by West Yorkshire Metro.

The bus station is situated in Castleford Town Centre off Albion Street and is approximately 110 yards (100 m) away from the town's railway station.

The rebuilt station has 10 stands in a drive-in-reverse out format while the original station had 15 stands on four islands at the bus station. The main operator is Arriva Yorkshire.

== History ==
The first bus station opened in May 1963.

The previous bus station had become rather outdated and had not seen the investment that others in West Yorkshire had, its replacement was a pending issue for the town for some time. Building works was due to begin in 2010 on a brand new bus/rail interchange situated at Castleford's rail station, however replacement was delayed. however the project was delayed and Metro and Wakefield Council are seeking funding from the Government for the work.

In 2013, Metro and Wakefield Council drew up plans for a replacement of the previous bus station. It was proposed that the bus station would have an enclosed waiting area, CCTV, a retail outlet and public toilets. Bus operators, disabled people's groups and ward councillors and the public were consulted prior to construction.

In mid-2014, the bus station closed for refurbishment. Works necessitated the installation of temporary bus stops on Albion Street and Enterprise Way. The new bus station was opened in 2015.

The new bus station cost £6 million and has all passenger facilities fully indoors rather than the previous outdoor shelters. This brings Castleford bus station up to the standards of neighbouring Pontefract and Wakefield bus stations.

== Services ==
Buses run from the bus station around the town of Castleford and as far a field as Leeds, Knottingley, Pontefract and Wakefield.

National Express Coaches (service 426) operate from here southbound towards London and northbound towards Sunderland.
