= Listed buildings in Kippax, West Yorkshire =

Kippax is a civil parish in the metropolitan borough of the City of Leeds, West Yorkshire, England. The parish contains nine listed buildings that are recorded in the National Heritage List for England. Of these, one is listed at Grade I, the highest of the three grades, and the others are at Grade II, the lowest grade. The parish contains the village of Kippax and the surrounding countryside. The listed buildings consist of houses and associated structures, a church and items in the churchyard, a barn, a former public house, a former windmill, and a milepost.

== Key ==
Grade	Criteria
I	Buildings of exceptional interest, sometimes considered to be internationally important
II	Buildings of national importance and special interest

== Buildings ==
Name and location	Photograph	Date	Notes	Grade
St Mary's Church, Kippax; 53.76767°N 1.36908°W		c. 1100	The church, which has been altered and extended, has retained some Norman material, much of it in herringbone masonry. The body of the church was restored in 1875–76 and the tower in 1893. It is built in magnesian limestone, with quoins, and a parapet. The roof of the nave is in lead, and the chancel has a slate roof, and a lead roof. The church consists of a nave, a south porch, a chancel, a vestry, and a west tower. The tower has diagonal buttresses, round-headed lancet windows, two-light bell windows, and an embattled parapet with crocketed corner pinnacles.	I
Grave cover, St Mary's Church; 53.76770°N 1.36874°W	—	Medieval (probable)	The grave cover in the churchyard to the east of the church is in magnesian limestone. It has a chamfered rectangular base, and a tapering ridged lid carved with a foliated cross and other decorations.	II
Barn, Home Farm; 53.75520°N 1.35592°W	—	Early 18th century	The barn, stables, byre and dovecote are in magnesian limestone, with quoins, and a stone slate roof, hipped on the south. The barn is at the front with seven bays, the byre and stables are at the rear, and the dovecote is in the south side. The centre bay on the front protrudes and is gabled, and it contains a round-arched wagon entry with impost bands, voussoirs, and an oculus in the pediment. At the rear is a porch between the byre and the stables with a segmental-arched wagon entry.	II
33–37 High Street, Kippax; 53.76675°N 1.36877°W		Mid 18th century	A house, later two shops, the oldest part is the rear wing, with the front range added in the early 19th century. The building is in magnesian limestone on a plinth, with a band, and a half-hipped roof of stone slate and Welsh slate. There are two storeys, a double depth plan, a front of three bays, and a rear wing. In the centre is a doorway with a moulded architrave, and a pediment on consoles. The outer bays contain inserted shop windows, and in the upper floor are sash windows. In the left return is a doorway with a quoined surround and a keystone.	II
Gate piers, former Kippax Park; 53.76661°N 1.36851°W	—	18th century	The gate piers and the screen wall at the entrance to the grounds of the former house are in magnesian limestone. The piers are square, rusticated, and about 3 metres (9.8 ft) high. Each pier has a moulded cap and a ball finial. Short screen walls run from the outer faces of the piers to the adjacent properties.	II
The former Royal Oak public house 53.76651°N 1.37146°W		Mid 18th century	The house, at one time a public house, is in rendered magnesian limestone, with quoins, a band covered by panels, a moulded cornice, and a hipped pantile roof. There are two storeys, six bays at the front and five at the rear. The doorway in the fourth bay on the front has been converted into a window, and has an architrave with pilasters, moulded imposts, and a cornice. The windows are sashes, that in the third bay in the upper floor with an architrave. At the rear is a doorway with a porch.	II
Stone shaft, St Mary's Church; 53.76756°N 1.36918°W	—	18th century	The shaft in the churchyard to the south of the church is in magnesian limestone. There is a two-step plinth of interlocking flagstones, on which is a shaft about 1 metre (3 ft 3 in) high, originally octagonal, but now weathered.	II
Windmill; 53.76373°N 1.35472°W		18th century (probable)	The former tower windmill has a circular plan and a south wing. It is in magnesian limestone, and the wing has a stone slate roof. The windmill is tapering and has four stages, the superstructure is missing and has been replaced by brick. The building contains doorways and windows, and in the wing is a square cart door.	II
Milepost; 53.76336°N 1.35249°W		19th century (probable)	The milepost is on the west side of Ridge Road (A646 road). It is in stone with cast iron overlay, and has a triangular section and a rounded top. Inscribed on the upper part is "HOOK MOOR BRANCH KIPPAX" and "BARNSDALE & LEEDS ROAD", and on the sides are the distances to Boroughbridge, Doncaster, Wetherby, Pontefract, Aberford and Castleford.	II
