= Listed buildings in Great and Little Preston =

Great and Little Preston is a civil parish in the metropolitan borough of the City of Leeds, West Yorkshire, England. The parish contains two listed buildings that are recorded in the National Heritage List for England. Both the listed buildings are designated at Grade II, the lowest of the three grades, which is applied to "buildings of national importance and special interest". The parish contains the villages of Great Preston and Little Preston, and the surrounding area. The listed buildings consist of a large house, and a barn and stables.

== Buildings ==
Name and location	Photograph	Date	Notes
Barn and stables north of Little Preston Hall; 53.76659°N 1.41250°W	—	Late 17th or early 18th century	The buildings are in brick, with cruciform vents, saw-tooted eaves bands, and stone slate roofs. They form an L-shaped plan, with the barn on the west side of a farmyard, and the stables with a granary above on the north side. The barn has a hipped roof, and it contains a square-headed wagon door and an owl hole with a perching stone. The stables have two storeys and four bays, and contain a doorway, rectangular windows, and a doorway in the upper storey approached by external steps.
Little Preston Hall; 53.76610°N 1.41214°W		Early 18th century (probable)	A large house, later divided, it is magnesian limestone, with moulded string courses, a moulded eaves cornice, and a slate roof with coped gables and kneelers. There are three storeys, a double-pile plan, a symmetrical front of five bays, and a single-storey rear extension. The central doorway has a moulded cornice with a raised medallion in the centre. In the outer bays are rectangular tripartite bay windows, and the other windows are sashes. The rear extension has a doorway with a moulded surround, over which is a panel with a coat of arms.
