= Bowers railway station =

Disused railway station in West Yorkshire, England

Bowers

General information
- Location: West Yorkshire, England, City of Leeds; England
- Coordinates: 53.7523°N 1.3781°W
- Grid reference: SE411286
- Platforms: 1

Other information
- Status: Disused

History
- Post-grouping: London and North Eastern Railway

Key dates
- 1934: Station opened as Bowers Halt
- 1937: Renamed Bowers
- 22 January 1951: Station closed
Location

Bowers railway station was a station opened in 1934 by the London and North Eastern Railway (LNER) on the Castleford–Garforth line, in the West Riding of Yorkshire, England. It was only open for 17 years, being closed in January 1951, though the line remained open until the 1990s for coal traffic from the nearby collieries.

== History ==
In 1934, the LNER opened a single platform halt on the Castleford–Garforth line between Kippax and Ledston railway stations. The platform was only capable of accommodating two coaches and was situated the eastern side of the line (as at Kippax and Ledston), and served a new housing estate between the railway and Bowers Row Colliery. When opened in 1934, it was called Bowers Halt, but this suffix was dropped in 1937 and it was known thereafter simply as Bowers.

Passenger traffic along the line was sparse and in January 1951, British Railways closed the line to passenger traffic, though it remained open for coal traffic from the collieries next to the line until the 1990s.

| Preceding station | Disused railways | Following station |
|---|---|---|
| Kippax; Line and station closed | North Eastern Railway; Castleford–Garforth line | Ledston; Line and station closed |
