= Great and Little Preston =

Civil parish in Leeds, England

- Parish
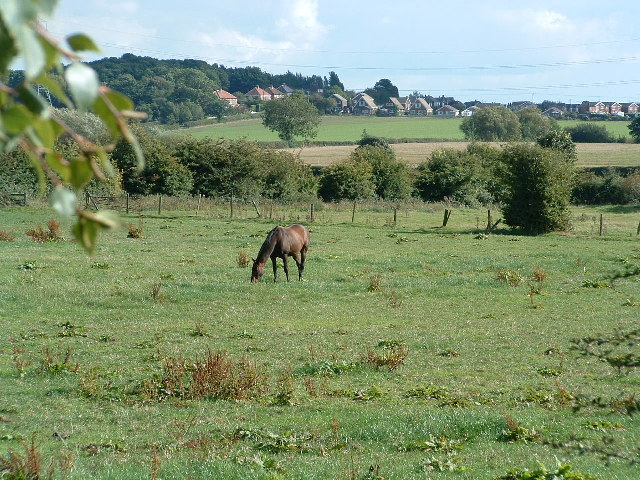
- Field in the parish
- Interactive map of Great and Little Preston
- Coordinates: 53.7624°N 1.3988°W
- Country: England, UK
- County: Yorkshire
- City: Leeds

Population (2011)
  - Total: 1,463
- Time zone: UTC+0:00 (GST)
- Website: Official website

Great and Little Preston is a civil parish in the City of Leeds metropolitan borough, West Yorkshire, England. In 2001 census it had a population of 1,449, and 1,463 in the 2011 census. It sits within the Leeds City Council ward of Garforth and Swillington.

== See also ==
- Listed buildings in Great and Little Preston
