= Castleford railway station =

Railway station in West Yorkshire, England

Castleford
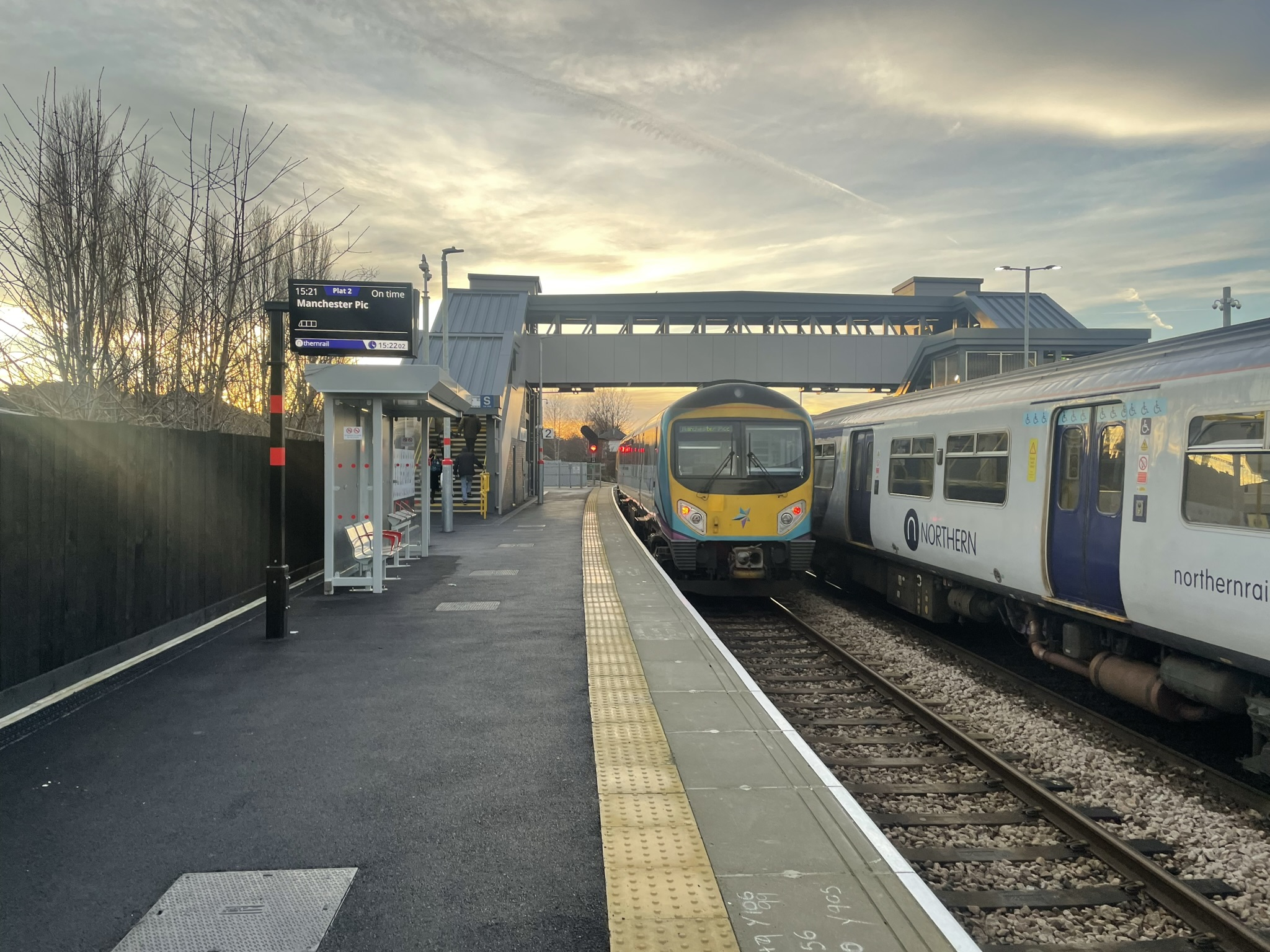
- Platform 2 with TPE and Northern services calling, December 2023

General information
- Location: Castleford, City of Wakefield, England
- Coordinates: 53.724°N 1.355°W
- Grid reference: SE426254
- Managed by: Northern Trains
- Transit authority: West Yorkshire Metro
- Platforms: 2

Other information
- Station code: CFD
- Fare zone: 3
- Classification: DfT category F1

History
- Opened: 1871 (current station)
- Original company: York and North Midland Railway
- Pre-grouping: North Eastern Railway
- Post-grouping: London and North Eastern Railway

Key dates
- 1 July 1840: First station opened as Castleford
- 1871: Station resited
- 15 September 1952: Renamed Castleford Central
- 20 February 1969: Renamed Castleford

Passengers
- 2020/21: ▼0.121 million
- Interchange: ▼2,556
- 2021/22: ▲0.353 million
- Interchange: ▲8,057
- 2022/23: ▲0.410 million
- Interchange: ▼7,980
- 2023/24: ▲0.424 million
- Interchange: ▲17,489
- 2024/25: ▲0.487 million
- Interchange: ▲29,455
Location
Notes
- Passenger statistics from the Office of Rail and Road

Castleford railway station serves the town of Castleford, in West Yorkshire, England. It lies on the Hallam and Pontefract lines, 11 miles (18 km) south-east of Leeds.

In February 2016, West Yorkshire Metro opened the new Castleford bus station close to the railway station, featuring an integrated and staffed transport interchange. Work on the new £6 million bus station was started in October 2014.

== History ==
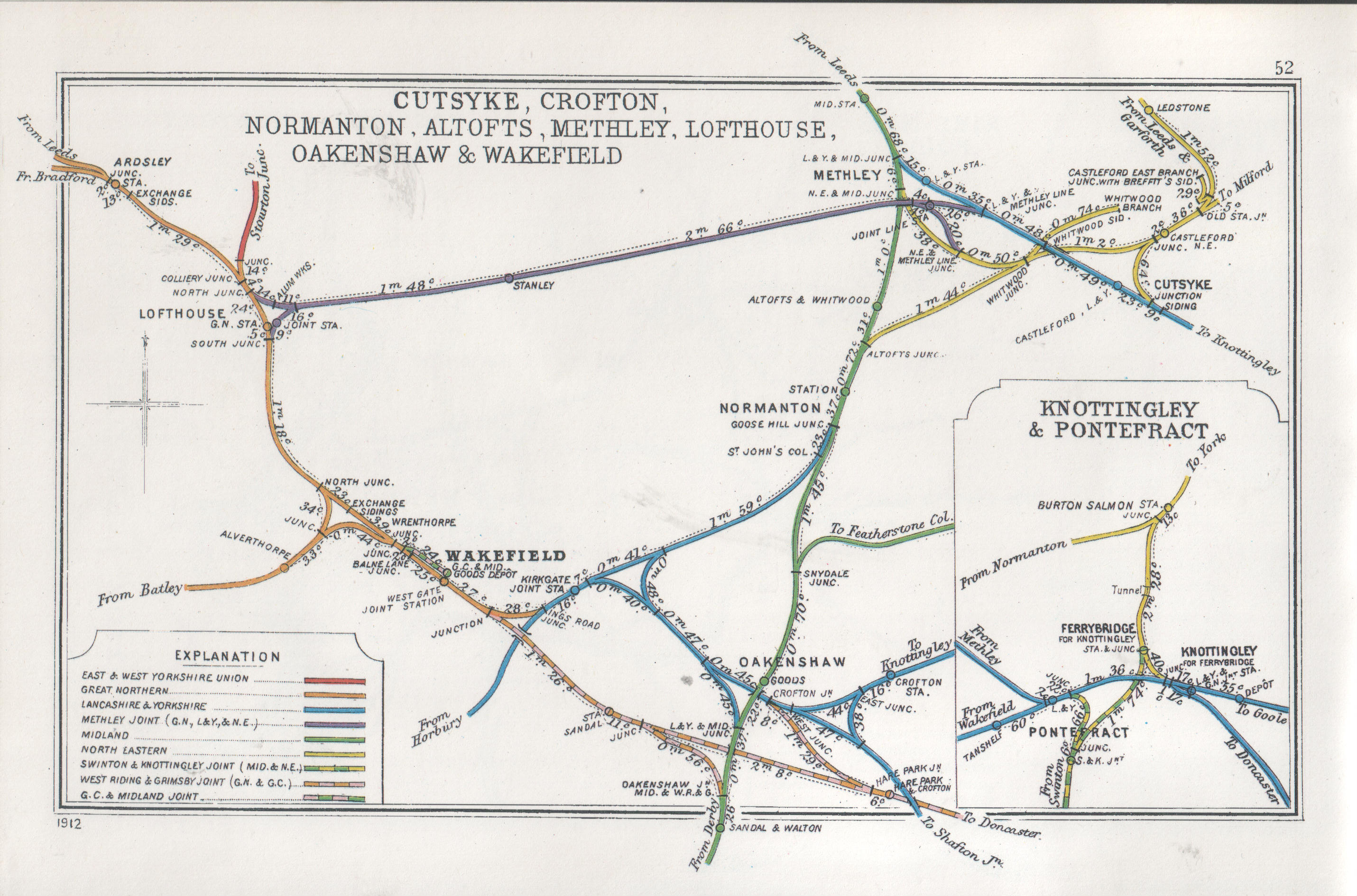
A Railway Clearing House diagram showing lines from Castleford in 1912

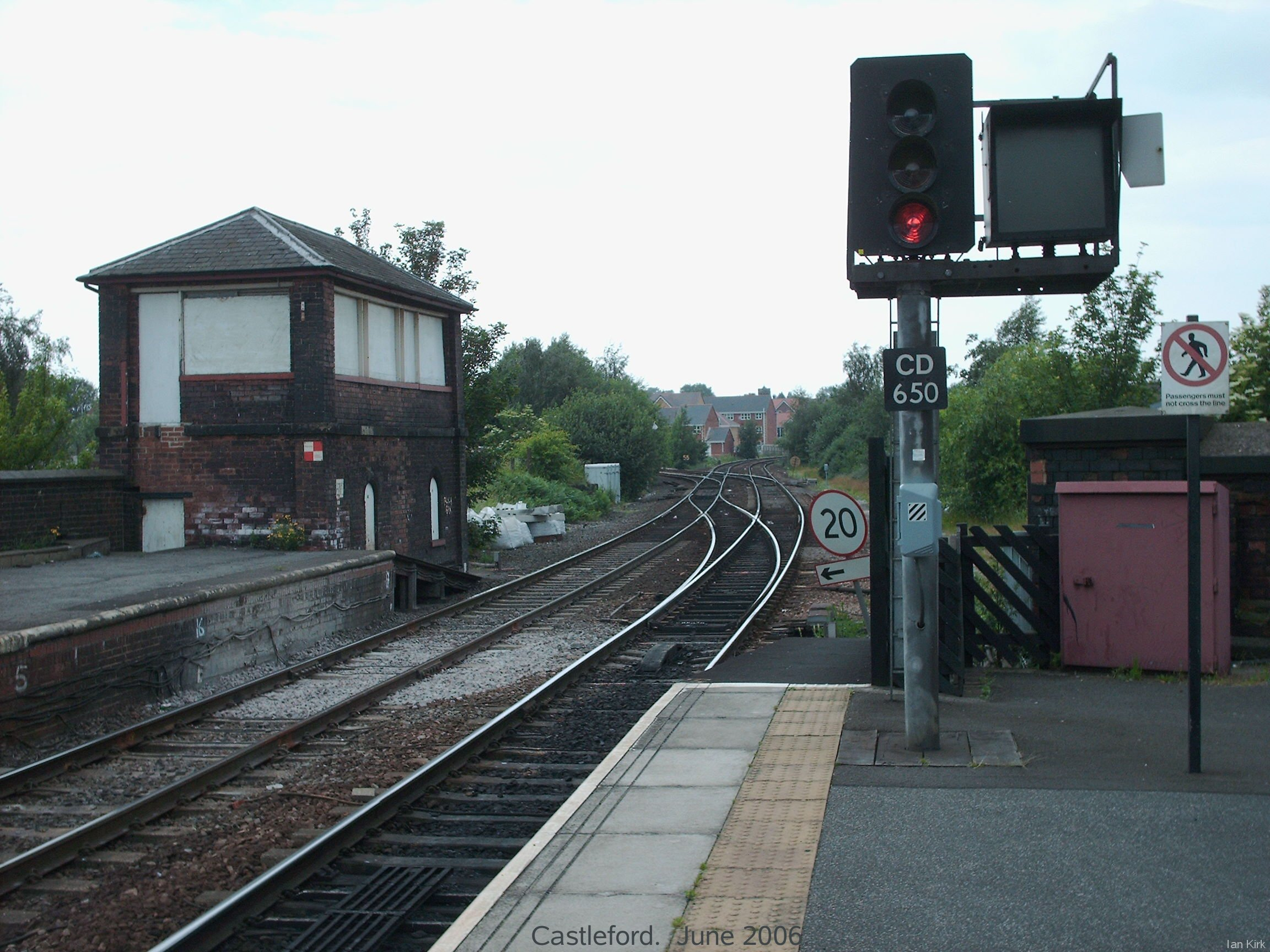
The old signal box in June 2006

The current station was built by the North Eastern Railway in 1871 to replace an earlier one 440 yards (400 m) to the east built by the York and North Midland Railway on their line from York to Normanton and opened on 1 July 1840. A short time later, an east to north curve was constructed between Whitwood and Methley junctions (the latter on the North Midland Railway main line) to create the first through route between York and Leeds – it would remain the primary route between the two cities until 1869 and also carry services between Leeds and Hull for a number of years thanks to the machinations of George Hudson.

The town gained a second station at Cutsyke in 1860, courtesy of the Lancashire and Yorkshire Railway whose line from Pontefract Monkhill to Methley Junction (and hence Leeds) had opened in 1849 and passed over the Y&NMR line near Whitwood Junction. Further construction work by both companies saw lines built to Lofthouse (on the main line from Wakefield Westgate to Leeds) via Stanley (the Methley Joint line) in 1865 (1 May 1869 for passenger traffic), to Garforth via Ledston in 1878 (giving passengers the choice of no fewer than three alternative routes to Leeds) and a curve linking the Y&NM and L&Y routes in the town two years later. This latter piece of line was seldom used for much of its life (and was closed on two occasions) but now forms an important part of the line towards Knottingley.

Thus by the end of the nineteenth century, the station (by then known as Castleford Central) had an impressive range of services to choose from, with regular links to Leeds, Wakefield and on towards Manchester Victoria, through the Calder Valley as well as to York. Longer distance destinations (including Sheffield, Derby, Birmingham and London) were also available by means of a change at Normanton.

By the early 1950s, however, the local network began to decline, with the Garforth line the first to lose its passenger trains on 22 January 1951. The Methley Joint line fell victim to the Beeching Axe on 2 November 1964 whilst the L&Y station at Cutsyke suffered a similar fate on 7 October 1968 – trains from Pontefract thereafter using the aforementioned curve to reach Central, where they reversed before continuing to Leeds via Whitwood Junction (although the direct line remained in use for freight until 23 February 1981).

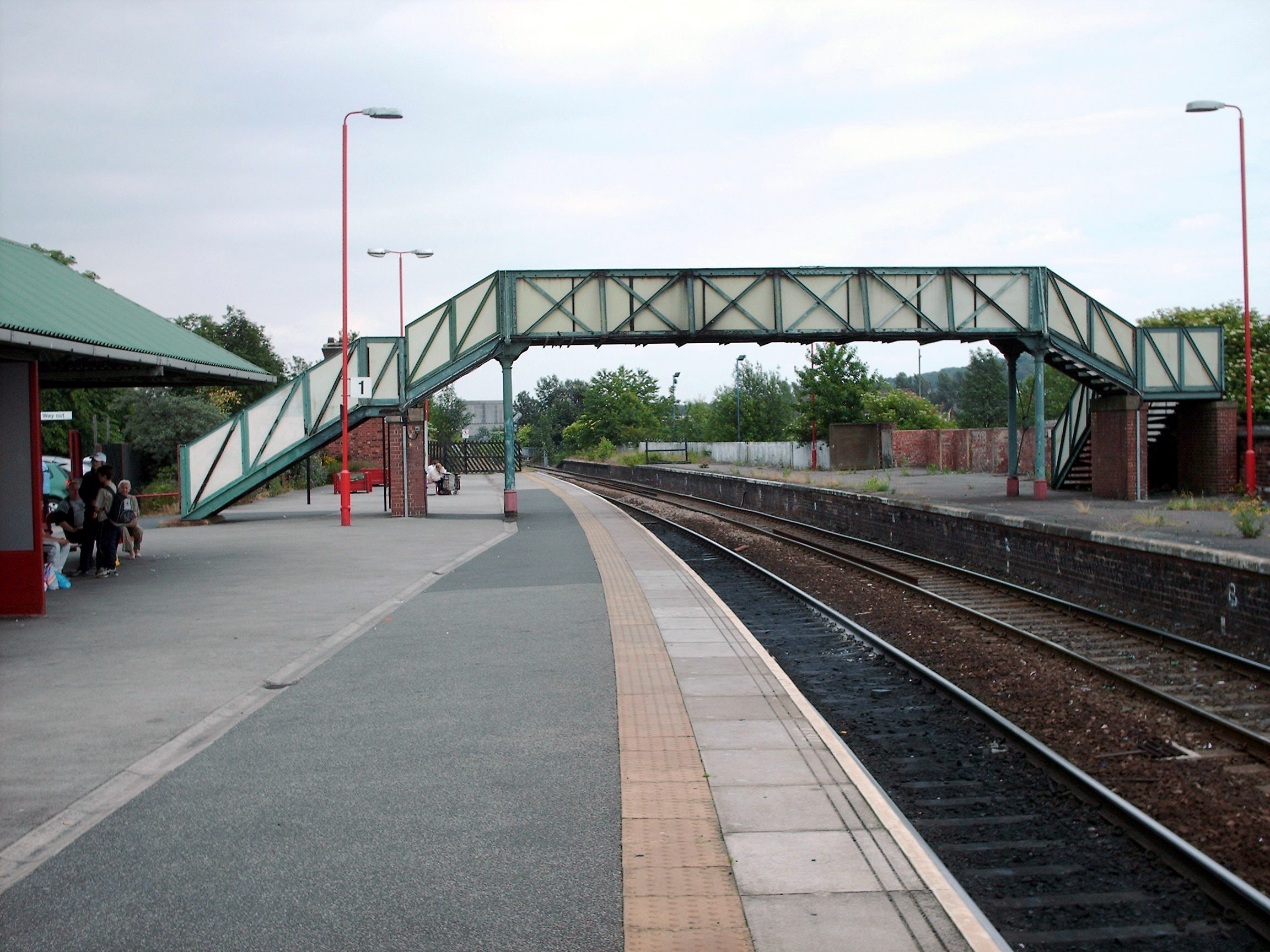
Castleford station in June 2006, prior to the redevelopment of 2020

Another significant change was the withdrawal of services on the original Y&NMR line between York and Wakefield on 5 January 1970, leaving the station to be served by trains on the Pontefract Line; although a handful of summer dated trains from Wakefield to York and Scarborough continued to run until 1988. This created the current situation whereby almost all scheduled trains calling there, apart from the Manchester to York trains, approach from the west, use a single platform and have to reverse to continue their journeys. Another development was the re-routing of trains on the Hallam line via the town in 1988, which reinstated the link with Wakefield and also gave passengers access to direct trains to Barnsley and Sheffield.

The station had substantial buildings on both platforms until the 1970s, but these were mostly demolished (along with the footbridge); one structure survived at the northern end of the remaining platform but not in passenger use. The old station signal box also remains, though it too is boarded up and disused (the area is now signalled from a panel box located next to the Castleford Gates level crossing).

A redevelopment of the station took place in 2020 with the construction of new station buildings and an enlarged car park. In November 2021, work began to restore the second platform. A new footbridge with lifts has been built to enable step-free access. The new footbridge was installed in October 2022 and was opened with the December 2023 timetable change.

Although Castleford was built originally as a through station, regular passenger services towards York were discontinued between 5 January 1970 and December 2023. All Northern Trains services calling at the station reverse here, arriving and departing from the former northbound platform 1. TransPennine Express operates through services, using platforms 1 and 2. Platform 2 had previously been brought back into temporary use during the Leeds First project in 2002; Trans-Pennine services between York and Huddersfield were diverted to avoid engineering work in Leeds, routed via Church Fenton, Castleford and Wakefield Kirkgate. Platform 2 has subsequently been restored to permanent use and rebuilt with a new footbridge to enable step-free access, in order to accommodate extra services as part of the Transpennine Route Upgrade project.

== Facilities ==
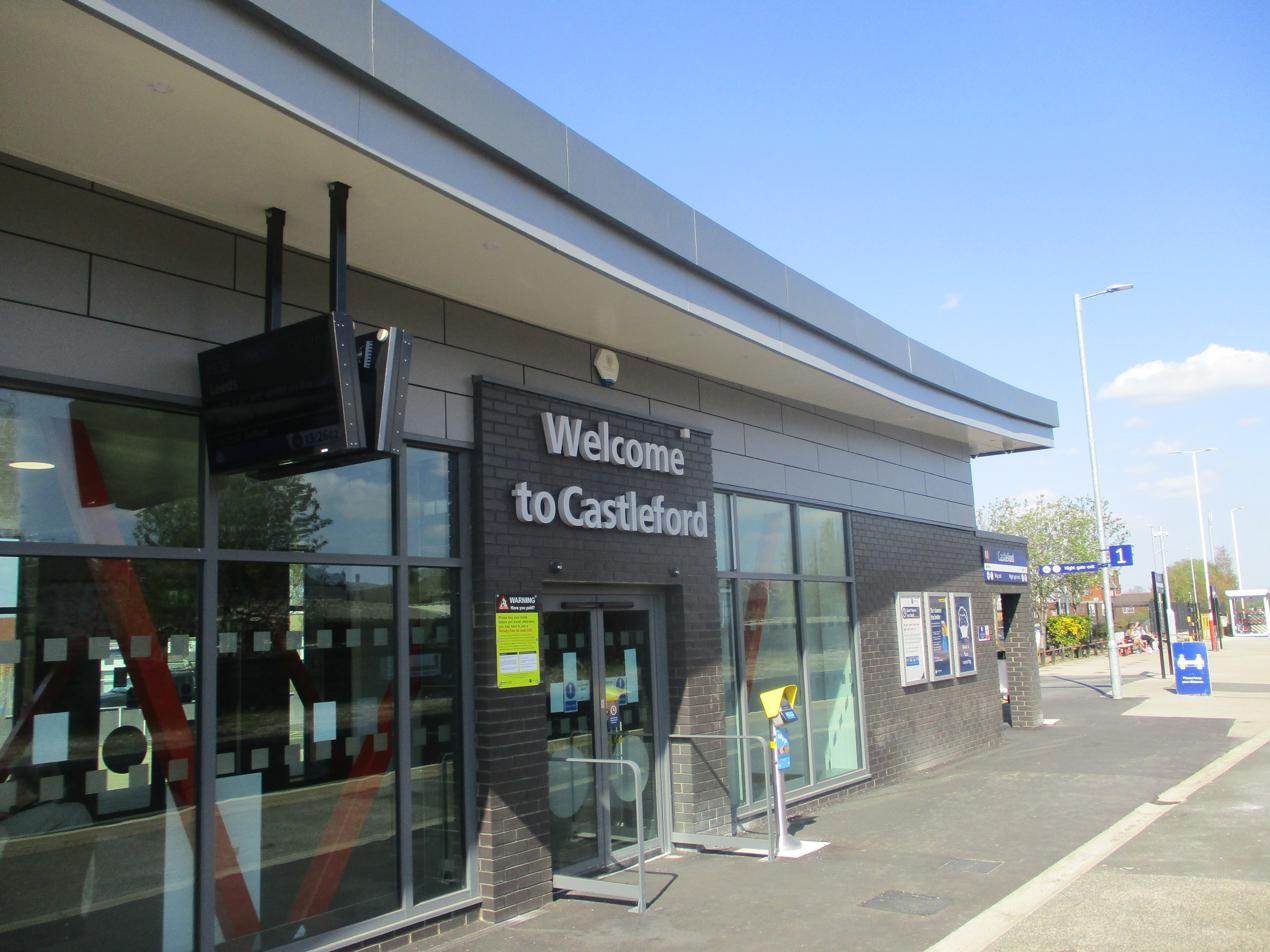
New station buildings were constructed in 2020, photo taken in April 2021

The station is unstaffed, though the Metro travel centre within the nearby bus station is staffed from 08:30 each day until 16:00 on weekdays and 14:30 on Saturdays (closed Sundays); this sells a full range of rail tickets. A self-service ticket machine is provided for use outside of these times and for collecting pre-paid tickets. A waiting room is available on the platform, along with a digital information screen and timetable poster board; automated train announcements also offer running information for passengers. Step-free access is available from the car park to the platform.

== Services ==
=== Northern Trains ===
On Mondays to Saturdays, the following service pattern operates in trains per hour:

- 2tph to Leeds,
- 1tph to Sheffield, via Barnsley
- 1tph to Knottingley.

On Sundays, there is an hourly service to Leeds, with two-hourly services to Sheffield and to Knottingley.

=== TransPennine Express ===
- 1tph operates in each direction between Manchester Piccadilly and York.

The service travels via Wakefield Kirkgate and Normanton instead of Leeds - the only North TransPennine service not to serve the city - and is the first direct service between Castleford and York since 1970. This is the only regular service to use the newly constructed platform 2 at Castleford, as all other services usually reverse using platform 1 (though some Northern trains from the Pontefract direction can and do use platform 2, as the track and signalling arrangements now permit this).

Preceding station	National Rail	Following station
Terminus	Northern Hallam Line	Woodlesford
Glasshoughton	Northern Pontefract line	Terminus
Normanton	TransPennine Express North TransPennine	York
	Disused railways	
Pontefract	NER; Castleford–Garforth line	Ledston
Pontefract	NER; York and North Midland Railway	Burton Salmon
Methley South	Methley Joint Railway	Terminus
