= Great Preston =

Village in West Yorkshire, England

Coordinates: 53.760°N 1.388°W

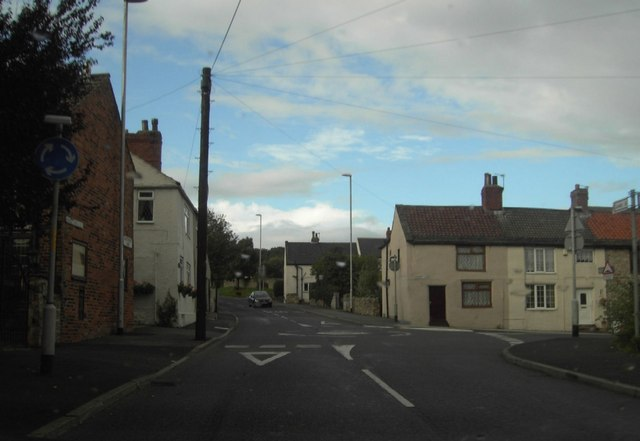
Preston Lane, Great Preston (2006)

Great Preston is a small rural village in the City of Leeds metropolitan borough, West Yorkshire, England. It has incorporated the once neighbouring hamlet of Little Preston.

== Location ==
Great Preston is situated 9 miles south east of Leeds city centre and is 2 miles south of the town Garforth. The villages of Kippax and Swillington are also in close proximity, and, due to development of land into housing to the south of the village, Great Preston now borders Allerton Bywater. The village is in the LS26 Leeds postcode area, and forms part of the civil parish of Great and Little Preston, which had a population of 1,463 at the 2011 Census.

== Etymology ==
The name of Great Preston is first attested in the Domesday Book of 1086, in the form Prestun and similar variants. The name comes from the Old English words prēost ('priest') and tūn ('farmstead, estate'). Thus it once meant 'estate belonging to a priest'.

The name Little Preston, coined to differentiate this settlement from its larger neighbour, is first attested between 1258 and 1265, as Preston Luttle. Meanwhile, the form Great Preston is first attested in 1488.

== Amenities ==
Great Preston has one pub, a local cricket and football team and a village hall. There is a C of E primary school based in an old Victorian building with a modern extension. St Aidan's church was closed in 1992, and changed into a community centre in 1998. The Working Men's club has also shut down and has been replaced by a snooker club.

== See also ==
- Listed buildings in Great and Little Preston
