= Ledston railway station =

Disused railway station in West Yorkshire, England

General information
- Location: Allerton Bywater, City of Leeds; England
- Coordinates: 53.7438°N 1.3555°W
- Grid reference: SE425277
- Platforms: 1

Other information
- Status: Disused

History
- Original company: North Eastern Railway
- Pre-grouping: North Eastern Railway
- Post-grouping: London and North Eastern Railway

Key dates
- 8 April 1878: Opened to goods (as Ledstone)
- 12 August 1878: Opened to passengers
- 1 July 1915: Name changed to Ledston
- 22 January 1951: Closed to passengers
- 30 September 1963: Closed to goods
Location

Ledston railway station was a railway station on the now disused Castleford–Garforth line in West Yorkshire, England. The station opened in 1878 and was closed in January 1951, well before the Beeching Axe took effect.

== History ==
The line between Garforth and Castleford was opened by the North Eastern Railway (NER) on 12 August 1878. The two intermediate stations on the line (Kippax and Ledstone) opened to passenger traffic at the same time (though goods had started in April 1878).

The station was equipped with only one platform on the eastern side of the line (Kippax having the same arrangement). The station was noted in the original NER architects drawings as being Allerton Bywater, but the NER had a common practice of not repeating station names across its network; they already had an Allerton station on the Harrogate to York line. So it is believed that the station took its name from nearby Ledstone Hall, an estate a 1-mile (1.6 km) to the north-east. Even so, in 1915, the spelling was changed again to Ledston.

The station was laid out with a single track at the one platform; the entire line was without a passing loop. Services in 1914 were usually six trains each way, four of which ran through to Pontefract. By 1949, this had been curtailed to just three services a day which all terminated and started at Castleford.

The station, and indeed the line, served a sparse population and so in 1951, just three years after nationalisation, the station was closed to passengers. Goods traffic continued in the station sidings until September 1963 and the line remained open through the station for freight trains to the adjacent Allerton Bywater colliery. Passenger excursion trains still used the station until the mid-1960s and advertised passenger trains were also diverted over the line and through Ledston when necessary. The station buildings were still in situ in 1983 and the signal box was not demolished until 1988. The station has since been demolished and a housing development now covers the site.

Preceding station	Disused railways	Following station
Bowers; Line and station closed	North Eastern Railway; Castleford–Garforth line	Castleford; Line closed, station open
