= Dringhouses Yard =

Former Marshalling yard in York, England

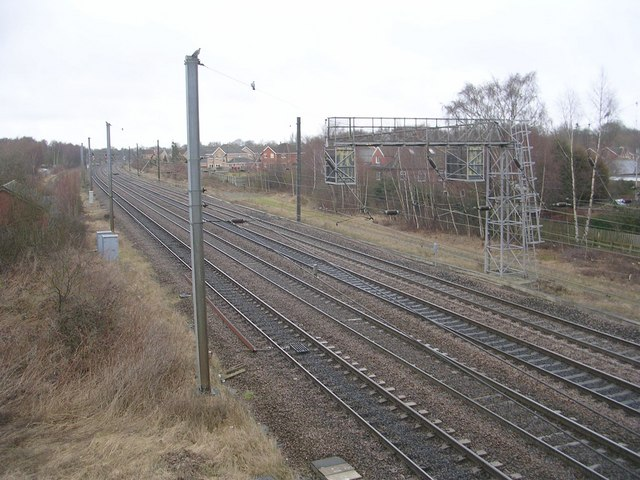
- View from Bridge EMM4-7 looking north; Dringhouses Yard was on the far side where the houses are now
- Interactive map of Dringhouses Yard

Location
- Location: Dringhouses, York, England
- Coordinates: 53.944°N 1.108°W

Characteristics
- Owner: British Rail
- Routes served: ECML; Foss Islands branch Harrogate Line

History
- Opened: 1916
- Closed: 1987
- Pre-grouping: North Eastern Railway
- Post-grouping: LNER
- BR region: Eastern

Dringhouses Yard was a railway freight marshalling yard on the East Coast Main Line (ECML), south of York railway station in England. The yard was built during the First World War to help with the increase in traffic caused by the support to the British war effort. The yard was modernised in the 1960s, being fitted with a hump (knuckle), to ease shunting operations. It was closed to all traffic in 1987 after the loss of local railfreight traffic around York.

== History ==
The installation of a yard at Dringhouses came about due to the amount of coal traffic passing through York during the First World War. Welsh coal was being transported north, for ships of the Royal Navy which had Scottish ports as their home base, and coal from County Durham was being taken to the Midlands and London. The need to cope with the additional traffic necessitated extra sidings and eventually, in 1916, the yard at Dringhouses. The yard was located 1 mile 40 chains (2.4 km) south of York railway station and was adjacent to the 'up' main line (the southbound line).

As part of the 1955 Modernistation Plan, Dringhouses was slated to be upgraded and remodelled. In 1961, the yard was remodelled from being flat shunted, to one with a hump installed, However, Dringhouses was equipped with Knuckle; a raised curved line that allowed shunting through gravity, rather than a yard fitted with Dowty retarders. The use of a knuckle required less engineering and space to operate the yard. A British Railways press release from January 1962, described Dringhouses as being the first yard to deal fully fitted (Note: A freight that had continuous brakes through all wagons that could be controlled by the driver is described as being fitted. A partially-fitted, or unfitted train, would require a guard at the rear of the train to apply braking from there also.) express freight trains. Modernistation of Dringhouses, coupled with the newer yards being constructed in Newcastle and Wakefield (Tyne Yard and Healey Mills Yard respectively), allowed some of the smaller yards at Darlington (Croft) and at Shildon, to be downgraded. The knuckle at Dringhouses was fitted with two primary lines which originally led to 20 sorting sidings. The Speedlink plans of the 1970s, promoted three yards in the Yorkshire and the Humber region as Primary network yards; Dringhouses, Healey Mills and Doncaster (Belmont). The yards at Tinsley (Sheffield), Scunthorpe, Immingham and Hull, were downgraded.

Whilst being a convenient interchange point for long-distance freight trains, Dringhouses was also a local yard that gathered freight from the area around York for onward transportation. Freight was forwarded from Knapton on the York–Scarborough line, the Derwent Valley Light Railway (DVLR), the goods depot at York Layerthorpe, but the bulk of the local traffic came from the Rowntrees factory at Foss Islands. This helped Dringhouses to become the busiest Speedlink yard in Yorkshire during the 1980s, when 12 long-distance trains were booked to call at Dringhouses every day. Grain traffic from Dunnington on the DVLR and from Knapton, was attached to trunk services from Doncaster to Burghead, Dufftown or Muir of Ord. By 1980, Dringhouses was one of twelve national network yards in Great Britain, but one of three in the Yorkshire region alone. After the resignalling at the south end of the yard (due to the closure of the old East Coast route through Selby via Chaloners Whin Junction), the yard had six reception sidings and nine sorting sidings, with the hump control tower, cabins and hump, all located at the northern end of the yard. However, most freight trains departing, or arriving from, the north, had to travel through the station at York rather than using the freight avoiding line to the west of the station, as the yard was located on the up side of the main running lines and pathing the trains through the station was easier for access to and from the yard.

Barely a year before closure, in May 1986, three trunk trains originated at Dringhouses (going to Derby and Aberdeen), with one arrival from Severn Beach. A further twelve passing services stopped at the yard to attach, or detach traffic. These included many long-distance services such as Dover to Tyne Yard, and Eastleigh to Tees Yard. The loss of the Rowntrees traffic in 1987 precipitated the closure of the yard, with any residual local freight traffic being handled at either Skelton or York North Yard. This also meant that freight could be concentrated in York North Yard, parts of which would be electrified under the ECML electrification scheme, and Dringhouses would then not need to be electrified, therefore avoiding extra cost. One of the last wagonload local services through York was government stores (Ministry of Defence) to the now closed storage location at Hessay on the Harrogate Line.

After closure, the lines were lifted and the site was used to store used ballast after the 1989 York remodelling scheme. The site is now occupied by housing.
