= Thorganby railway station =

Disused railway station in Thorganby, North Yorkshire, England

Thorganby
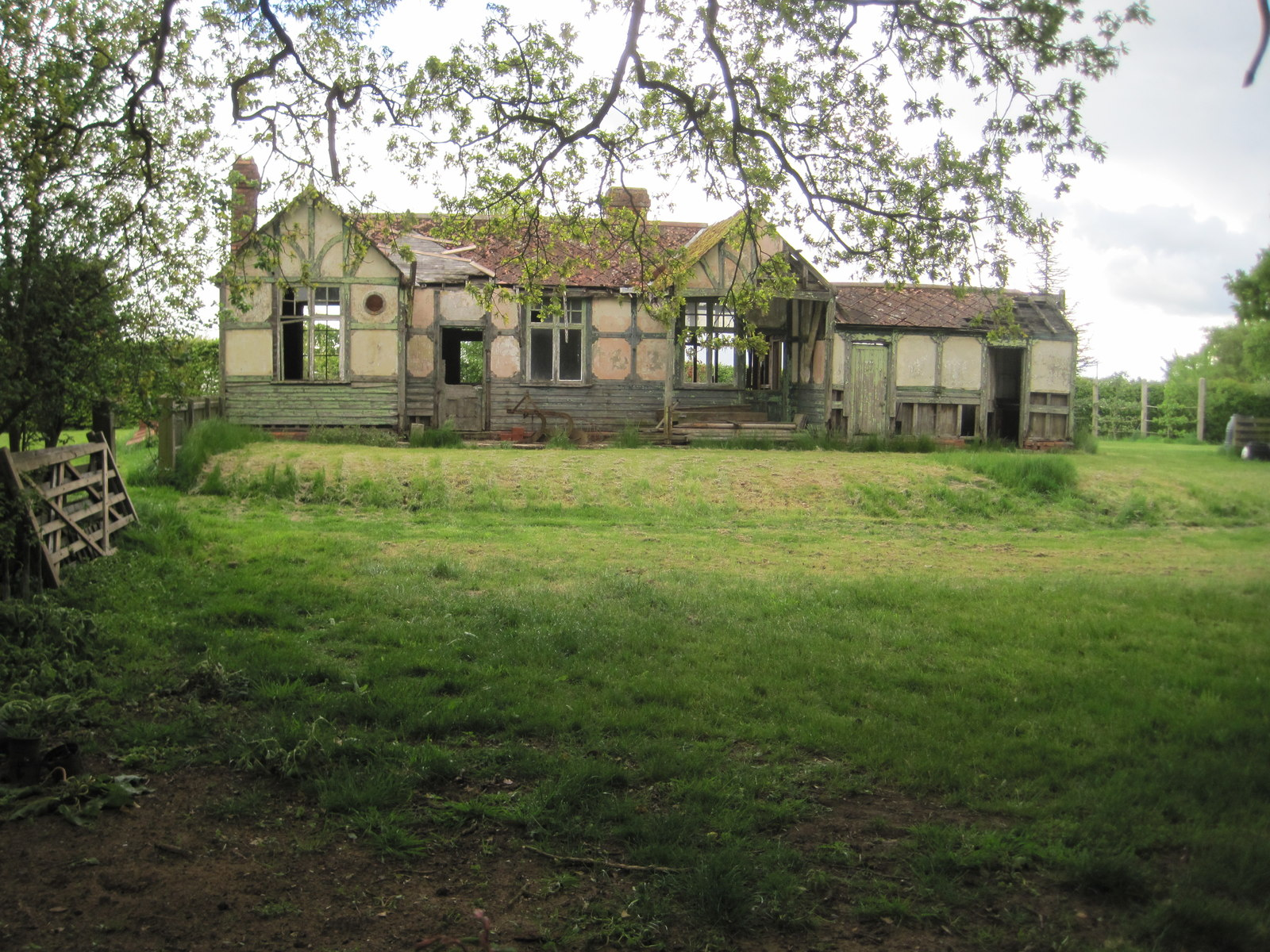
- The site of the station, looking east towards the then derelict station building, in 2015

General information
- Location: Thorganby, North Yorkshire; England
- Coordinates: 53.8595°N 0.9709°W
- Grid reference: SE677408
- Platforms: 1

Other information
- Status: Disused

History
- Original company: Derwent Valley Light Railway

Key dates
- 29 October 1912: Opened to goods
- 21 July 1913: Opened to passengers
- 1 September 1926: Closed to passengers
- 16 January 1965: Closed to goods
Location

Thorganby railway station served the village of Thorganby, North Yorkshire, England from 1912 to 1965 on the Derwent Valley Light Railway. The station had services services northwards to York (Layerthorpe railway station) and south to Cliffe Common, which was a station on the line between Selby and Market Weighton.

== History ==
Whilst the line was first proposed in 1898, it wasn't built until 1912. Thorganby station opened to passengers in July 1913, along with the other stations on the Derwent Valley Light Railway, and it closed to passengers in 1926. However, it was opened for goods traffic in October 1912 from Wheldrake south through Thorganby to Cliffe Common due to high local demand.

The station was 11 1/2 miles (18.5 km) south of York Layerthorpe railway station (the line's northern terminus) and 4 1/2 miles (7.2 km) north of the southern end of the line at Cliffe Common, though connections could be made there to Selby railway station, which was on the line between Selby and Market Weighton. Ocassionally services did run through to Selby, though these were rare.The station was 3/4 mile (1.2 km) from the village of Thorganby, and was mainly built to encourage agricultural traffic. During the passenger carrying era, the service pattern was typically three return trains per day, though delays were frequent as the trains were mixed passenger and goods, and this involved some shunting at stations.

The station at Thorganby was on the east side of the line and had just one platform, though a passing loop was installed immediately south of the station and the goods yard had four sidings.

Life at Thorganby station was said to have changed very little throughout the line's existence, even during World War II. The main traffic handled by the station in its entire 52 year long existence was local agricultural produce. The main produce handled was potatoes, sugar beet and cereals. After WW2, there were some minor developments at the station, namely some new coal pens and a 'Nissen' hut built in 1950.

Complete closure to freight came in 1965 along with the rest of the line south of Wheldrake. Of the original station facilities, only the station building remains, which was in a derelict state prior to restoration in the mid 2010s. The stationmasters house survives as a private dwelling.

Preceding station	Historical railways	Following station
Cottingwith; Line and station closed	Derwent Valley Light Railway	Skipwith; Line and station closed
