= Wheldrake railway station =

Disused railway station in Wheldrake, East Riding of Yorkshire, England

Wheldrake
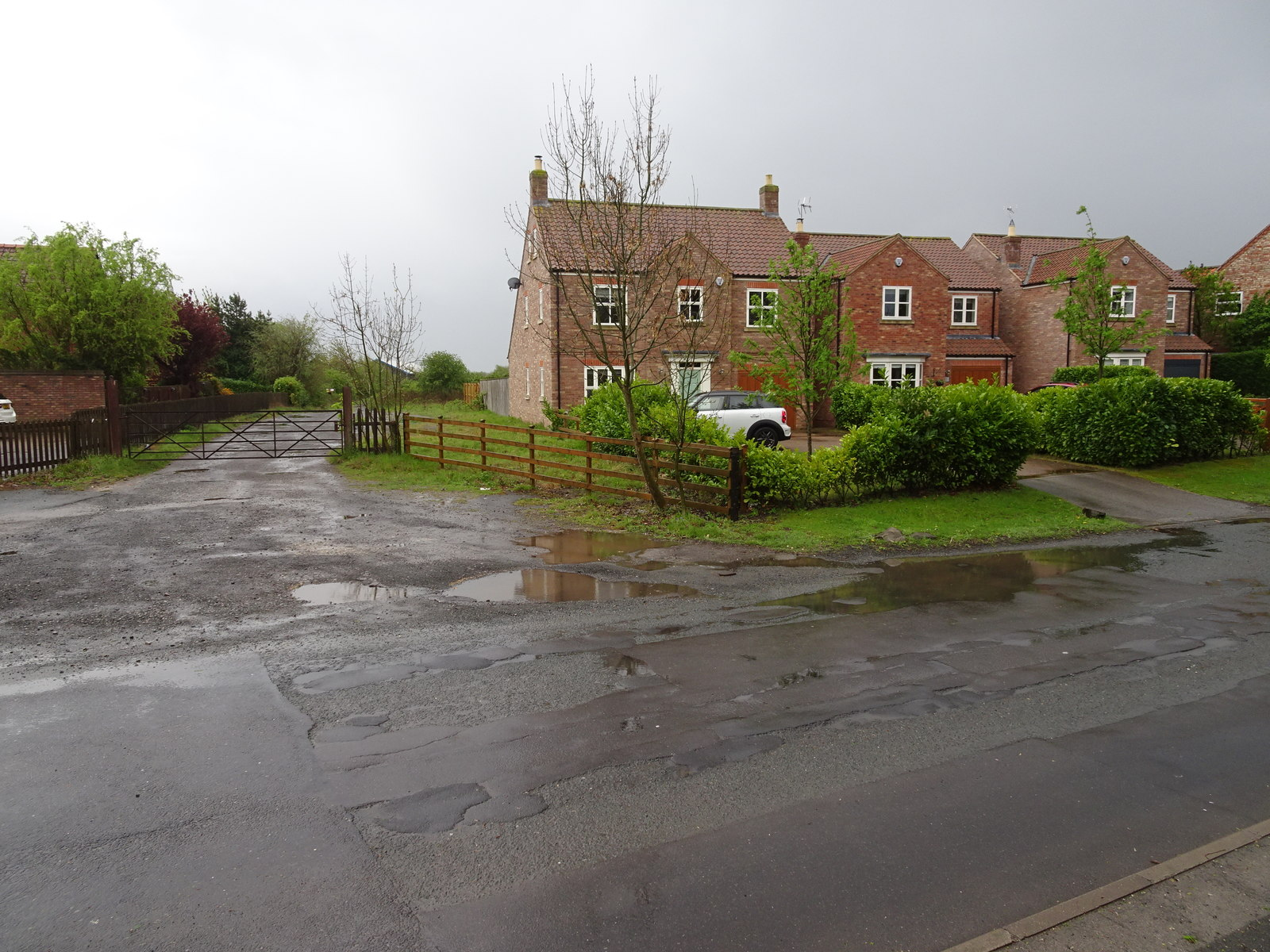
- The site of the station in 2019 (the actual site is behind the camera)

General information
- Location: Wheldrake, East Riding of Yorkshire; England
- Coordinates: 53.8934°N 0.9747°W
- Grid reference: SE674446
- Platforms: 1

Other information
- Status: Disused

History
- Original company: Derwent Valley Light Railway

Key dates
- 21 July 1913: Opened
- 1 September 1926: Closed to passengers
- 1968: Closed to freight
Location

Wheldrake railway station served the village of Wheldrake, East Riding of Yorkshire, England from 1913 to 1968 on the Derwent Valley Light Railway.

== History ==
The station opened on 21 July 1913 on the Derwent Valley Light Railway. From the original plans for the DVLR, Wheldrake appears to have been intended to be a major intermediate station on line. There were plans to build a larger-than-usual goods yard and a full length loop. This never materialised, though Wheldrake was the location at which the only water tower between Layerthorpe and Cliff Common. The station was also allocated a total of 4 members of staff- a stationmaster and 3 porters. This again shows that the DVLR had high hopes for the station, as it was also the only station top conveniently serve the village it bore the name of. However by 1947, the 4 staff had been reduced to one- Porter-in-Charge Mr F. Stabler.

During the Second World War, Wheldrake's yard was taken over by the Royal Engineers, who used it for unloading bombs. These bombs were then stored in the yard or in the verges of nearby roads. Somehow during this period there was not a single incident of a bomb being hit by a car and subsequently exploding- but it must have been a unnerving experience for the locals. The station was also used for petrol trains during Operation FIDO, an operation based at the nearby Melbourne Aerodrome.

As part of Operation FIDO, Wheldrake handled some 1,921,680 gallons of petrol in just under 2 years. It is estimated that Operation FIDO, despite it extravagant usage of fuel, saved some 11,000 lives.

After the war, like most other DVLR stations, Wheldrake saw some industrial developments. A total of 8 Nissen huts were erected on the platform for the storage of fertiliser. Also post-war, in 1952, The Ministry of Works purchased some of the southern portion of the station to create a buffer store. This was primarily used to store and supply sugar, though other foodstuffs like corned beef and biscuits were also stored here. Many thousands of tons were handled whilst the store was in use.

== FIDO ==
Main article: Fog Investigation and Dispersal Operation

FIDO stands for Fog Investigation and Dispersal Operation and it has its origins in Birmingham University. It involved laying pipelines on both sides of the runway with fuel pumped through them. Burner jets were positioned at intervals that could produce a wall of flames that had the effect of dispersing the flames. All this meant that during times of fog at nearby aerodromes, planes could be diverted to Melbourne from said fog-affected aerodromes. 15 other aerodromes were to be fitted with this system.

== Closure ==
In January 1965, the line south of Wheldrake to Cliff Common was closed, and the track lifted shortly after. This left Wheldrake as the new southern terminus, with the line being worked from Layerthorpe. The many depots that served Wheldrake soon began closing or switching to road transport which meant the section of line was only carrying sugar beet traffic, itself in decline. Therefore, the decision was taken to closure yet more of the DVLR- this time the section from Elvington to Wheldrake. The last train working south of Elvington ran on the 14th May 1968, driven by DVLR driver William Watson. It was made up of two 'Presflo' wagons and the DVLR's ex-LNER pigeon brake van.

However, all was not lost. For, in 1997, the preserved DVLR further up the line at Murton was in need of a station building. So they bought Wheldrake, and from 1997-98 it was dismantled and re-erected at Murton Park. The station still stands there, welcoming passengers whenever the line is open most weekends from February through to Christmas.

The actual station site is now an empty field.

| Preceding station | Historical railways | Following station |
|---|---|---|
| Elvington; Line and station closed | Derwent Valley Light Railway | Cottingwith; Line and station closed |
