= Great Yorkshire Railway Preservation Society =

Former railway preservation group in England

Coordinates: 53.9967°N 1.4977°W

The Great Yorkshire Railway Preservation Society was a short-lived preservation scheme, based in Starbeck, North Yorkshire in England. It was formed in 1980 with the aim of restoring part of the Leeds-Northallerton Railway and based at the former Starbeck loco shed, then owned by Octavius Atkinson steel works. The steel works closed in 1989, and the group moved to the Yorkshire Museum of Farming at Murton, near York, where they went on to successfully restore part of the former Derwent Valley Light Railway.

== Locomotives ==
Locomotives at the site included the following:

- Ruston 48 4wDM "Ryan" built in 1952. As of 2026 it is based at the Chasewater Railway in Staffordshire.
- Peckett 0-4-0ST 2013, built in 1948. As of 2026 it is based at the Ribble Steam Railway in Lancashire.
