= Murton Lane railway station =

Disused railway station in North Yorkshire, England

Murton Lane

General information
- Location: Murton, City of York; England
- Coordinates: 53.9629°N 1.0082°W
- Grid reference: SE651522
- Platforms: 1

Other information
- Status: Disused

History
- Original company: Derwent Valley Light Railway
- Pre-grouping: Derwent Valley Light Railway
- Post-grouping: Derwent Valley Light Railway

Key dates
- 21 July 1913: Opened
- 1 September 1926: Closed
Location

Murton Lane railway station served the village of Murton in the City of York, part of the Ceremonial County of North Yorkshire, from 1913 to 1926 on the Derwent Valley Light Railway.

== History ==
The station opened on 21 July 1913 by the North Eastern Railway. It closed to both passengers and goods traffic on 1 September 1926.. The platform remained in situ for several decades after closure but at some point was demolished with no trace remaining.

== Preservation ==
Nearby to Murton Lane is Murton Park. Murton Park is home to the preserved DVLR whose running line extends to the other side of the eponymous Murton Lane to the original station.

Preceding station	Historical railways	Following station
Osbaldwick; Line and station closed	Derwent Valley Light Railway	Dunnington Halt; Line and station closed
