= Skipwith railway station =

Disused railway station in Skipwith, North Yorkshire

Skipwith (& North Duffield)
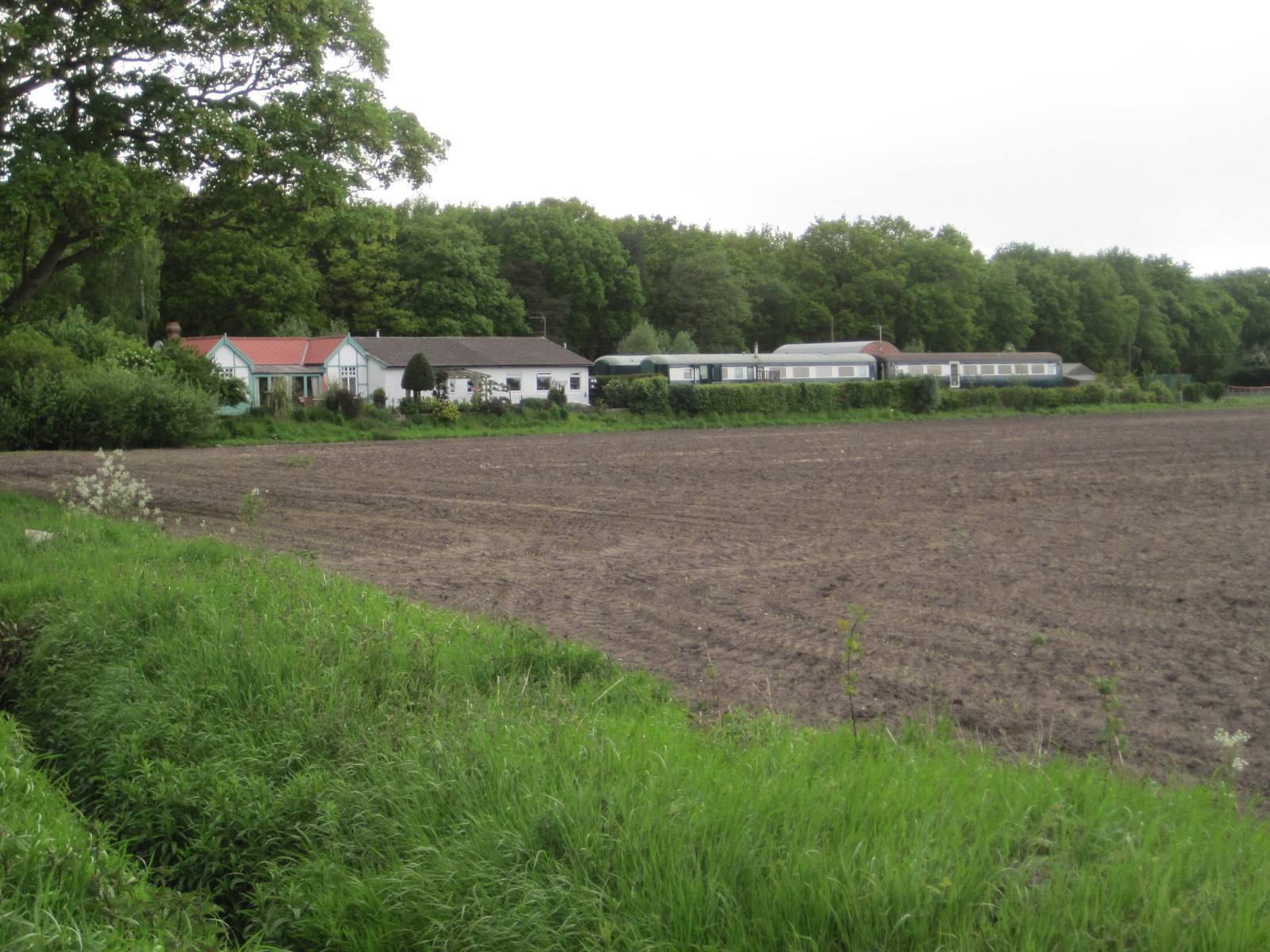
- The site of the station in 2015

General information
- Location: Skipwith, North Yorkshire; England
- Coordinates: 53.8361°N 0.9811°W
- Grid reference: SE671382
- Platforms: 1

Other information
- Status: Disused

History
- Original company: Derwent Valley Light Railway

Key dates
- 21 July 1912: Opened
- 1 September 1926: Closed to passengers
- January 1965: Closed to freight
Location

Skipwith railway station also known as Skipwith (and North Duffield) served the village of Skipwith, North Yorkshire, England from 1912 to 1965 on the Derwent Valley Light Railway.

== History ==
Skipwith station opened in 1912 to cattle and goods. The section of line from here to Cliff Common was the first of the DVLR to open to traffic. Prior to the DVLR's construction, thought was given to building a short branch line to serve a nearby farm, though this didn't get very far beyond being suggested.

The station was originally to be built north of the road it sits on, but due to a dispute with the local landlord, it was built to the south. Skipwith had a passing loop where trains could pass each other en route to their respective destinations. In the mid 1920s a siding was laid out at the station using track lifted at Cliff Common and a turntable built.

Due to the low usage of the DVLR's station at Cliff Common, Skipwith became the de-facto southern terminus of passenger services and even after regular passenger services were curtailed the station still acted as the terminus of the Blackberry Specials that were run in the '20s and '30s. These specials were supervised by Skipwith's Porter-in-Charge Henry Howden and his wife Lavinia who met the passengers at Skipwith and lead them to the blackberry fields. The Howdens lived at and managed Skipwith for the vast majority of the station's life- Henry's son Eric taking over after his father's retirement and remaining there until 1965.

Unlike most DVLR stations, Skipwith wasn't demolished and so the distinctive station building has survived. The station has become a holiday home with 3 camping coaches stationed in the old platform.

Preceding station	Historical railways	Following station
Thorganby; Line and station closed	Derwent Valley Light Railway	Cliff Common; Line and station closed
