= Wheldrake =

Village and civil parish in North Yorkshire, England

Coordinates: 53.8960°N 0.9612°W

- Village and civil parish
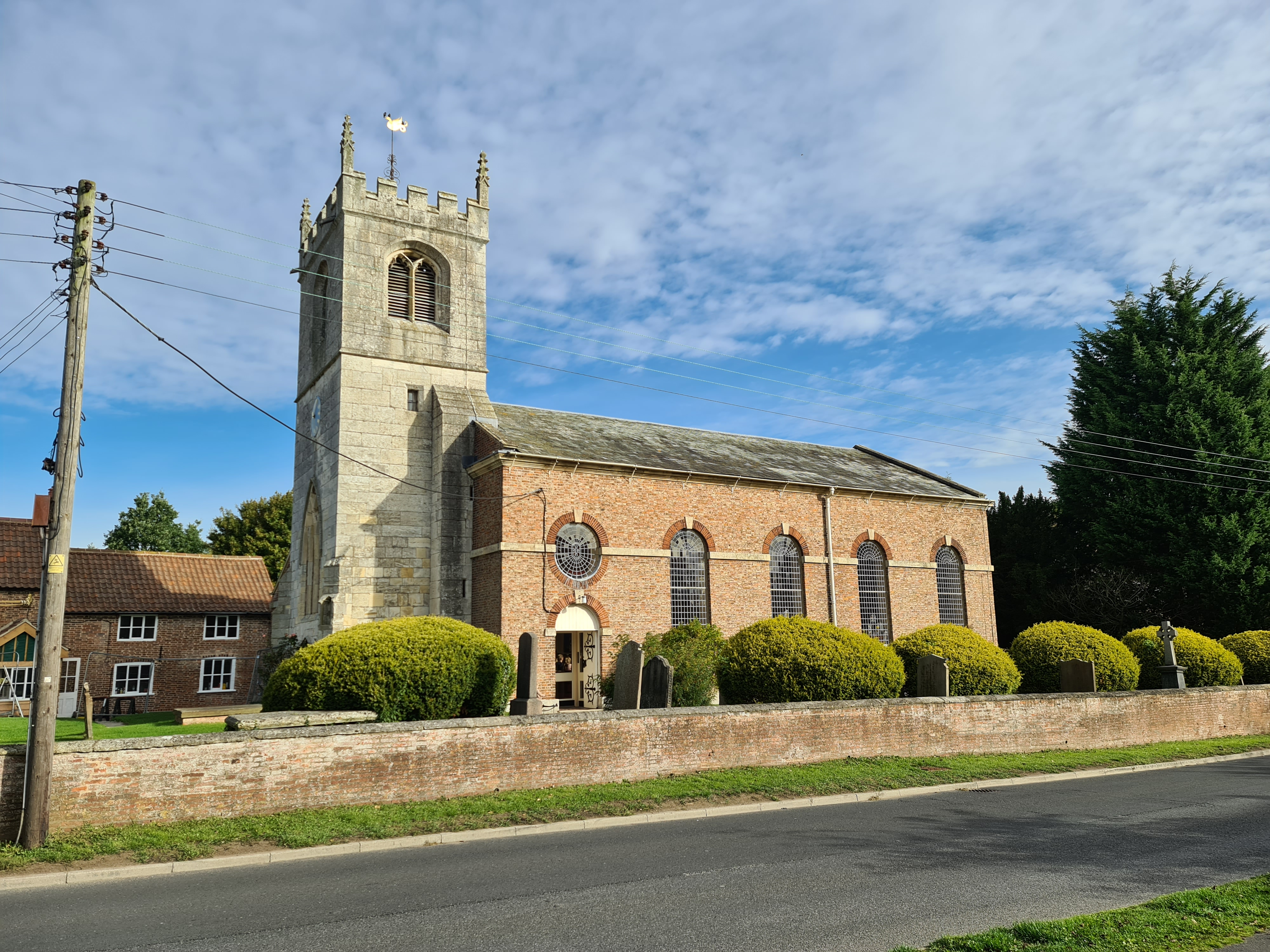
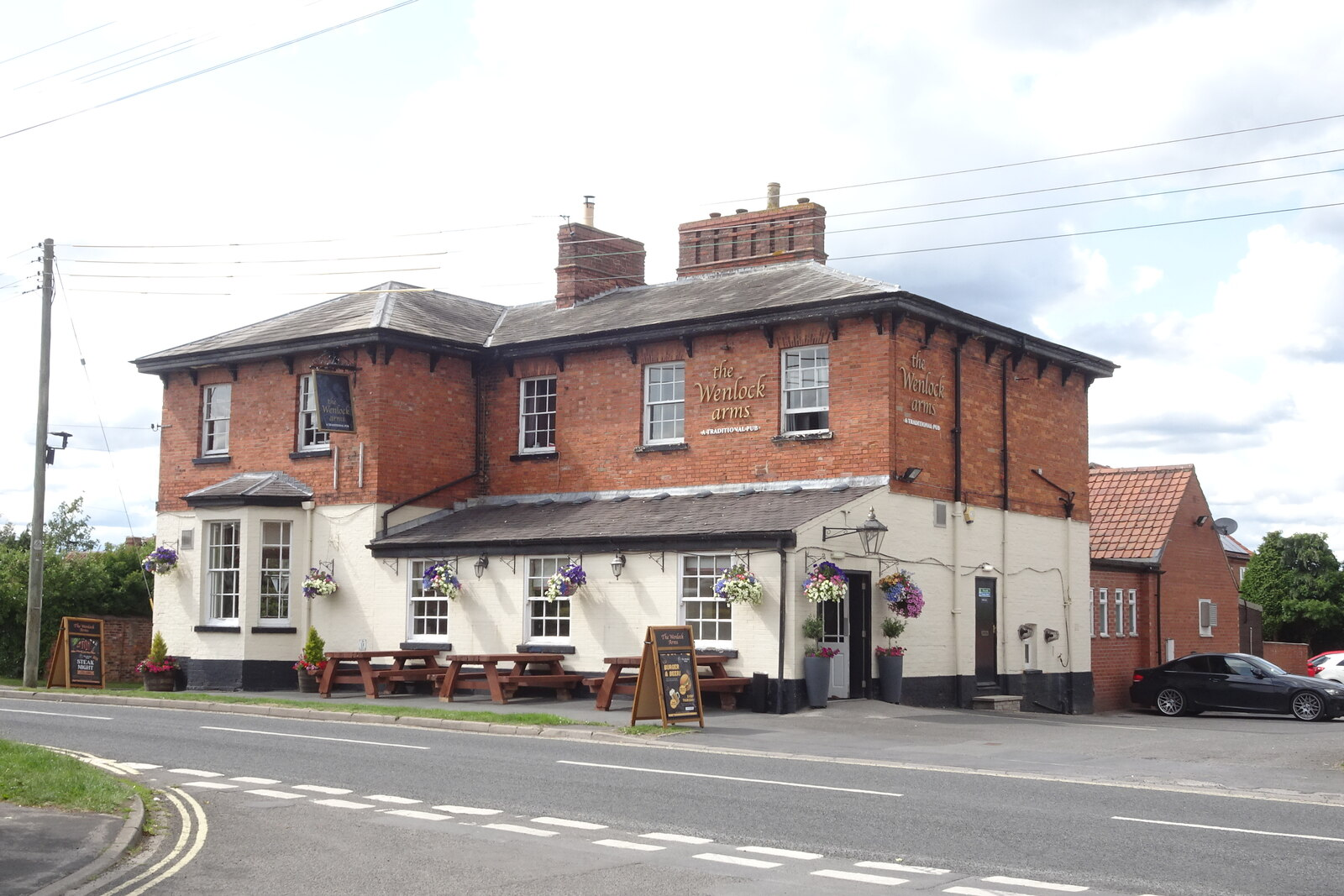
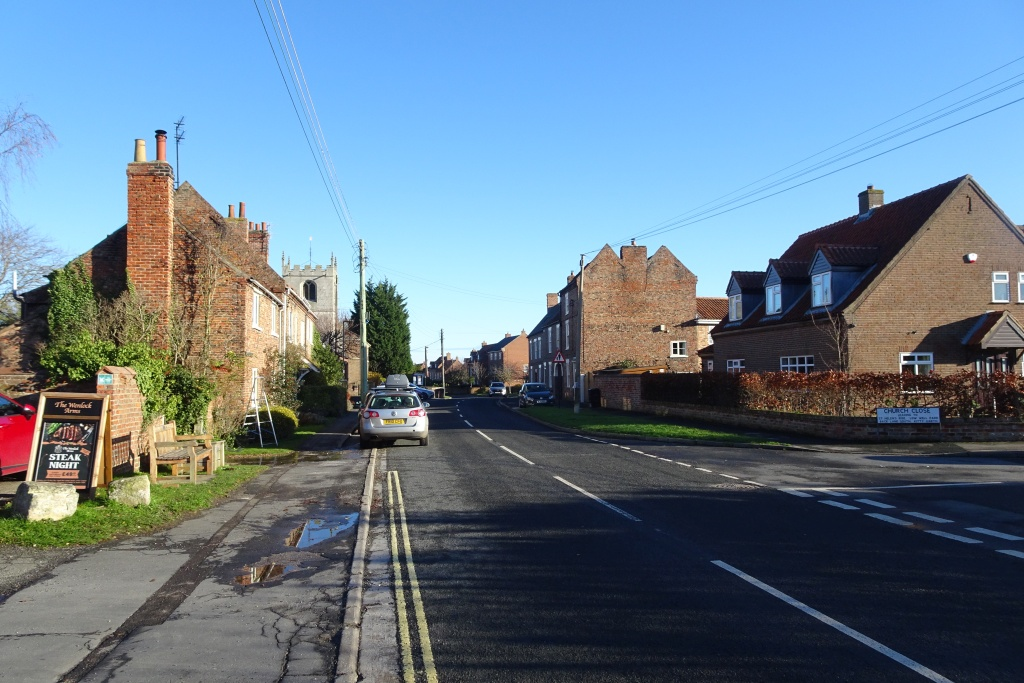
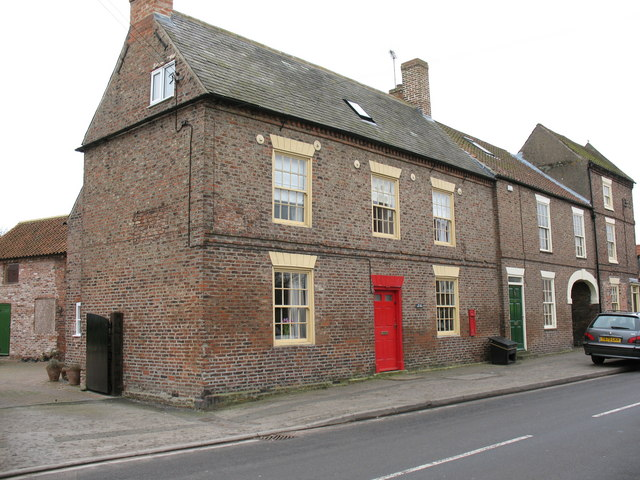
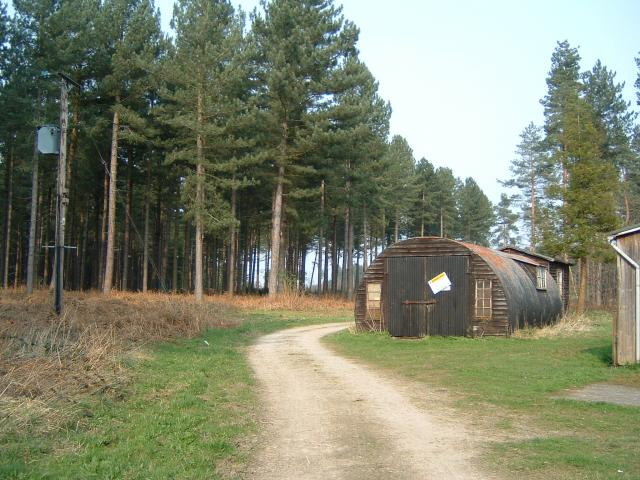
- The Church The Wenlock Arms Wheldrake Main Street Old Post Office Wheldrake Woods

- Location within North Yorkshire
- Population: 2,107 (2011 census)
- OS grid reference: SE682449
- Civil parish: Wheldrake
- Unitary authority: City of York
- Ceremonial county: North Yorkshire
- Region: Yorkshire and the Humber
- Country: England
- Sovereign state: United Kingdom
- Post town: YORK
- Postcode district: YO19
- Dialling code: 01904
- Police: North Yorkshire
- Fire: North Yorkshire
- Ambulance: Yorkshire
- UK Parliament: York Outer
- Website: Wheldrake Parish Council website

Wheldrake is a village and civil parish located 7 miles (11 km) south-east of York in the unitary authority of the City of York, which is in the ceremonial county of North Yorkshire, England. According to the 2001 census the parish had a population of 1,909, increasing to 2,107 at the 2011 census.

The village was historically part of the East Riding of Yorkshire. Administratively it was a part of the Selby District in the shire county of North Yorkshire from 1974 until 1996. Since 1996 it has been part of the City of York unitary authority.

The parish of Wheldrake covers an area of 4,300 acres (1,700 ha). It was established before 1066 and after being largely in the possession of Fountains Abbey in the Middle Ages, it became part of a landed estate until the mid 20th century. It has a significant conservation area and a nature reserve of international importance. This, named Wheldrake Ings, is a mile east of the village, and is where many wild flowers flourish and rare birds prosper.

Most of the employed people who live in the village commute to work. There is a primary school, a church, a shop with post office and a public house which serve 761 households. There is a small industrial estate near the western approach to the village.

== Demographics ==
According to the UK government 2001 census, Wheldrake had a population of 1909. The mean age of the population was 41.73 years, somewhat older than the national average of 38.6 years. There were 379 people below the age of 16 and 368 over the age of 64. The number of households was 761.

Of the people who travel to work by motorised transport 653 travel by private means and 59 use public transport. The average journey to work is 21.73 km.

== Geography ==
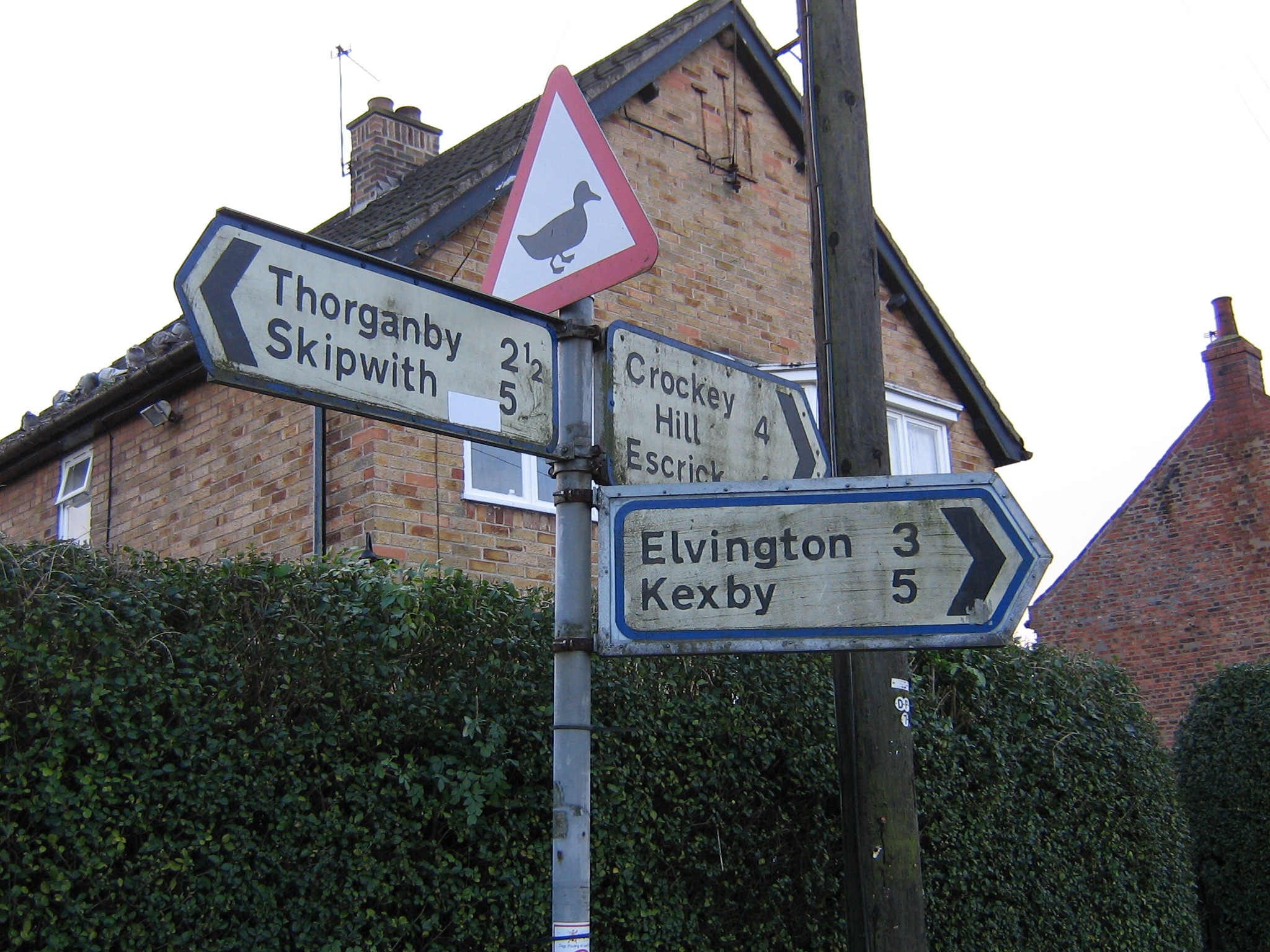
Minor roads of Wheldrake

=== Situation and transport ===
Wheldrake is in the southern part of the Vale of York. It is situated 7 miles (11 km) to the south east of York. It lies between the A19 trunk road and the River Derwent and is reached by an unclassified road which leaves the A19 at Crockey Hill. Minor roads to Thorganby, Elvington and Escrick meet at Wheldrake. There is a bus service to York which leaves Wheldrake every two hours. The journey to York takes 20 minutes.

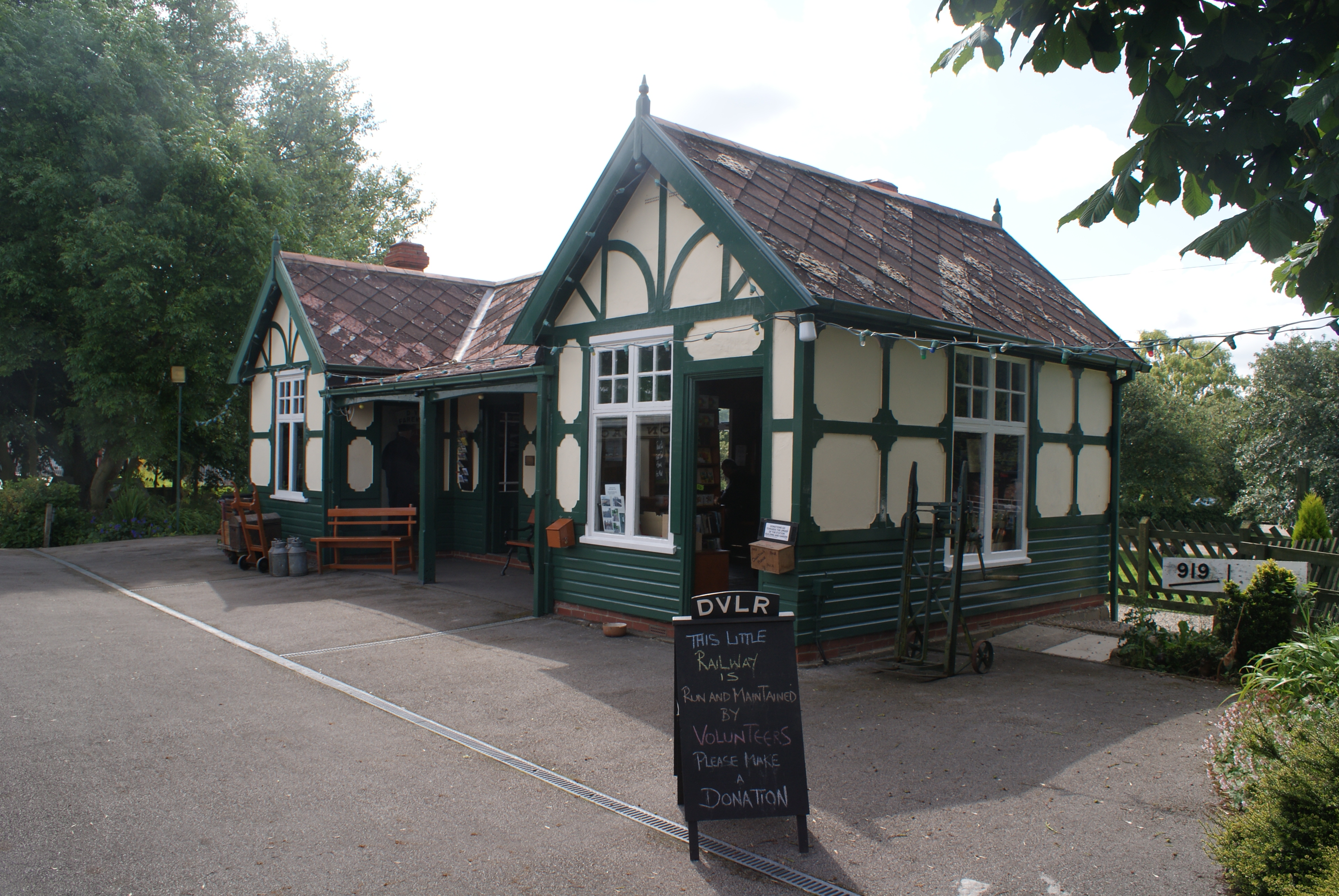
The former station, now preserved

Between 1912 and 1926 Wheldrake was served by a passenger service on the Derwent Valley Light Railway. The line was open for freight traffic until 1968. The former station is now preserved at the Yorkshire Museum of Farming, at Murton near York.

=== Physical geography ===
The rocks underlying this area in the south of the Vale of York are Triassic Bunter sandstone but in this area they are largely overlain by later glacial drift deposits. The village is sited on the slightly raised Escrick moraine. This is one of the terminal moraines that was left in the Vale of York when the ice retreated at the end of the last ice age. The resultant soils vary from thick clay to sand and alluvium and their fertility is consequently very variable. The river Derwent flows in a southerly direction at the eastern boundary of the parish. This river was tidal until a flood barrier was built downstream in the mid 20th century. The height of the land is between 7 metres (23 ft) and 17 metres (56 ft).

=== Climate ===
Wheldrake is in the more northerly part of England and although it has a typically English temperate climate which is influenced by the warming effect of the Gulf Stream, it is slightly cooler than London. In the summer months the average maximum temperature is 20 °C and the minimum is 11 °C. In the winter the average maximum is 7 °C and the minimum is 2 °C. Average monthly precipitation varies between 68 mm in August and 37 mm in March. In May, June and July the sun shines for an average of six hours a day but in January and February there is an average of only one hour of sunshine. The weather is very variable from day to day. Extremes recorded at the University of York campus (6 km from Wheldrake) between 1998 and 2006, include a highest temperature of 33 °C and a lowest temperature of −6.9 °C. The most rainfall in one day was 53.8 mm.

== Natural history ==
The Wheldrake Ings are part of the internationally significant nature reserve of the Lower Derwent Valley which is a site of special scientific interest (SSSI) and a Ramsar Convention site. The Ings are areas of flood meadows along the river Derwent which flood seasonally and are rich in wildlife. They are mainly recognised for their significant collection of birds but they also support significant collections of mammals, plants and invertebrates.

Wheldrake Woods in the north of the parish was planted by Forestry England and has mainly conifer trees. The open cultivated agricultural land is not species-rich but the hedgerows, field margins and roadside verges support some small mammals and an increasing number of grasses and flowering plants.

== History ==
On air photographs an extensive Iron Age or Roman field system is visible as crop marks. There are ditched enclosures, round houses, enclosures, a track way and possibly a square barrow. In 2002 a Roman farm was discovered at Wheldrake. Excavation of the site revealed structural remains, four Roman graves, animal bones, pottery and the remains of a main Roman road.

The name Wheldrake possibly derives from the Old English cweldric meaning 'death strip', i.e. a strip of land where a death occurred.

In Saxon times Wheldrake was in the Danelaw area of England and so probably consisted of a number of scattered family farming enclosures. In 1066 the land was held locally by a person called Norman but the overlord of the area was Morcar, Earl of Northumbria. It was worth 20 shillings in tax and there was enough arable land for four ploughs to be used.

After the Norman Conquest of England in 1066 Wheldrake was given by the new king, William I to a follower called William Malet. By the time that the Domesday Book was written in 1086 it belonged to William de Percy and was known as Coldrid. The local lord was William Coleville. There was extensive woodland, 20 acres (81,000 m^{2}) of meadow, three fisheries, a water mill and the church. From a nucleus of about 350 acres (1.4 km^{2}) of land lying around a small deliberately planned village of 16 plots the cultivated area began to be expanded. In the 14th century the land was farmed as four open arable fields with common land for grazing animals. Several gifts of land in Wheldrake were made to monasteries and by the end of the 15th century Fountains Abbey owned a large part of the land in the village.

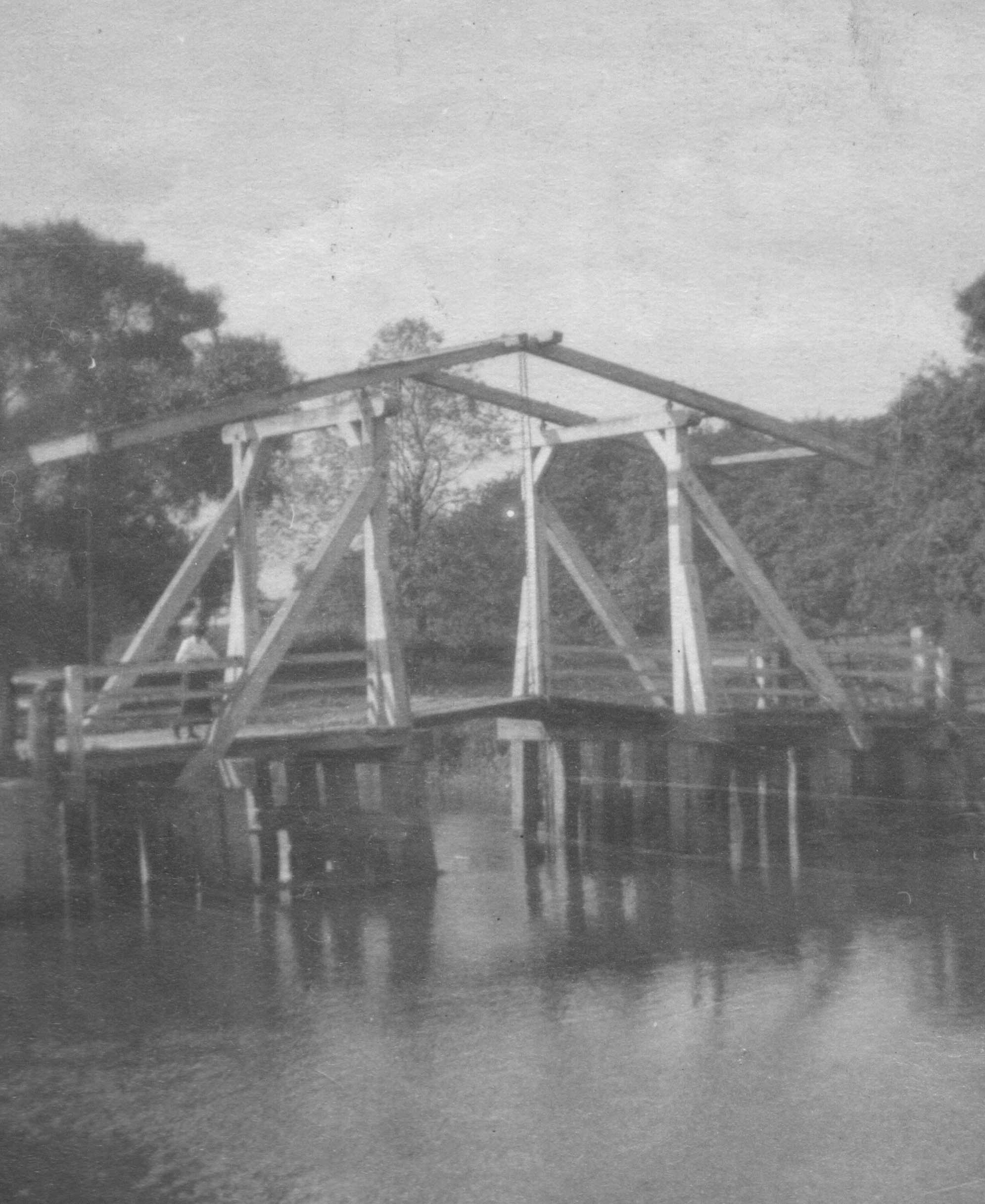
The old Ings Bridge over the River Derwent was replaced in the 1960s.

When King Henry VIII dissolved the monasteries, the land in Wheldrake which had belonged to Fountains and other abbeys was confiscated and granted or sold to private individuals including Robert Robotham, servant to Edward VI and Blanche Parry, servant to Elizabeth I, And Sir Thomas Le Carre, son of French nobleman Sir Henri Le Carre, close friend of Henry VII and former owner of Sheriff Hutton castle. These individuals became the landlords, collecting rent from the farmers and householders who lived in the village. In 1609 the open fields of Wheldrake still existed. There were 58 leaseholders and 13 freeholders in the village. There were 65 houses. Fifteen people rented only their dwelling houses. These included a weaver and a miller. There was a windmill in the village on a field which is still called Millfield.

In 1773 the landlords applied to parliament to enclose the land of the manor. It was then that the land was made into enclosed farms with fences and ditches around them. In 1778–9, the body of the village church was demolished and rebuilt in the Georgian style, although the thirteenth-century stone tower was retained.

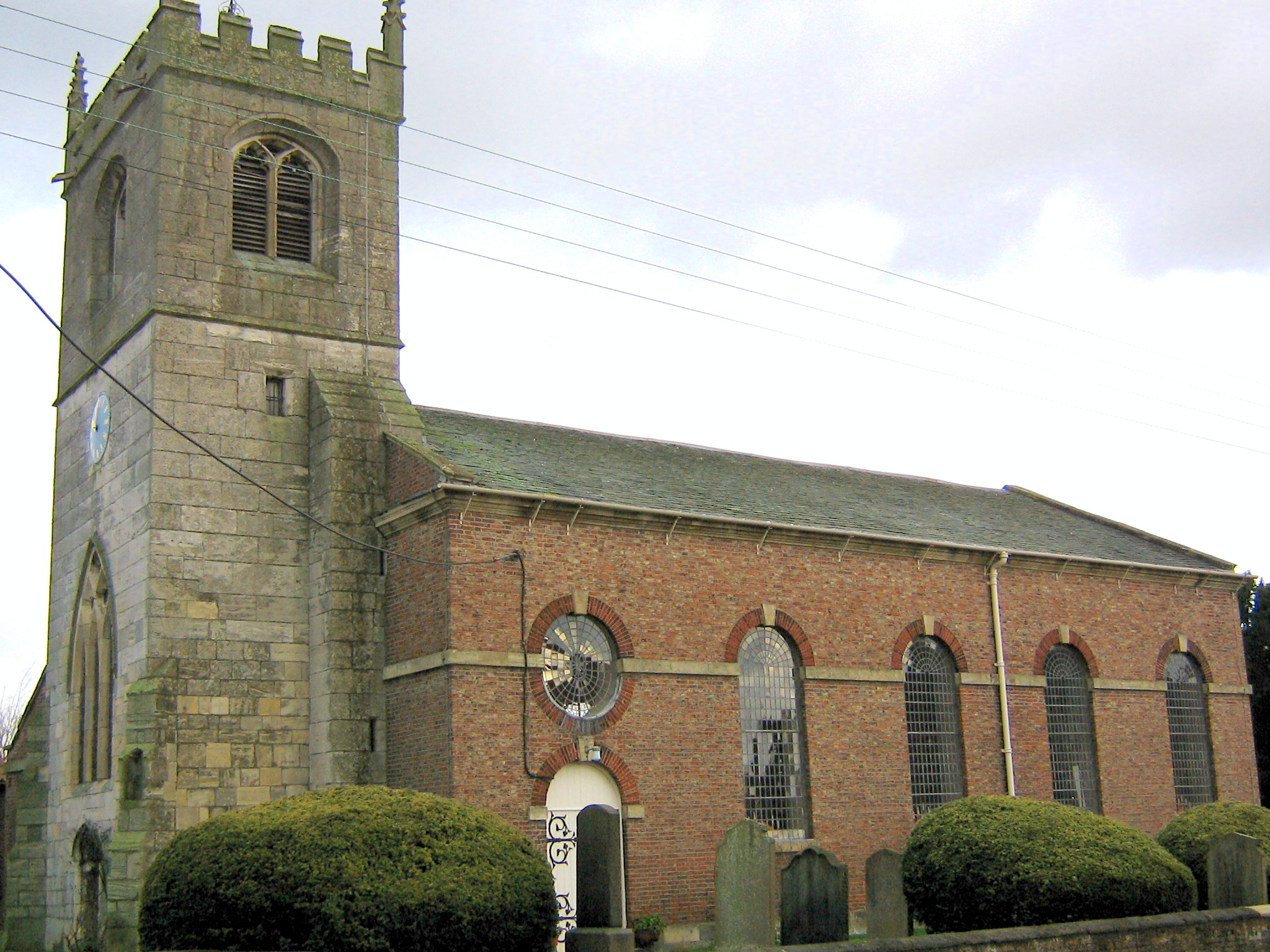
The 18th century church

There were between 30 and 40 farmers in Wheldrake in the early part of the 19th century. Some lived on farms outside the built-up area of the village but many still had farmhouses with yards, barns and stables in the village Main Street. The chief crops that were grown were oats, peas, turnips and rape. Much of the farm land was used for pasture for animals or as hay meadows. Most of the land was still owned by a landlord and rented to the local farmers. At this time there were a large number of shopkeepers and traders in the village providing for the needs of agricultural workers in Wheldrake and the neighbouring villages.

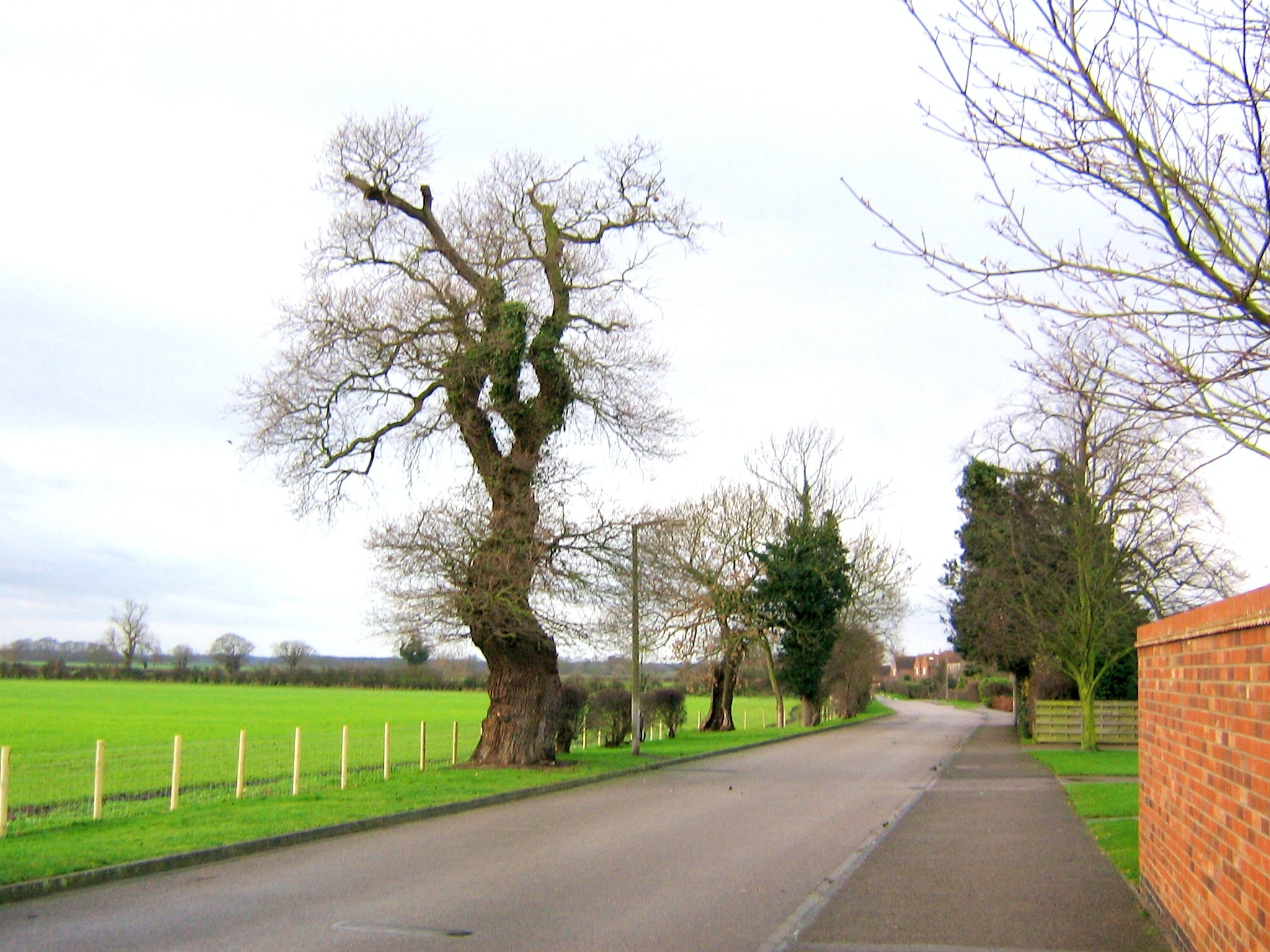
South Back Lane

In the 20th century the main landowner sold many of the farms and houses that he owned in the village. These were bought by farmers and other private individuals. From the mid 20th century as people became more able to travel to their places of work and to larger shops in towns by motorised transport, the village shops and craft businesses suffered a decline in custom and started to close down. Conversely, people employed in towns found the rural environment attractive and chose to make their homes in Wheldrake. The result of this was an increase in the number of houses being built so that the old nucleus of the village is now almost surrounded by late 20th century housing developments.

The Wheldrake telephone exchange became ADSL enabled from September 2004, and ADSL Max enabled in March 2006. It has been accepting orders for FTTC BT Infinity since March 2014.

== Architecture and conservation ==
Wheldrake Conservation Area was designated in 1979. It comprises the historic Main Street, its continuation as Church Lane and the Back Lanes which were all established as part of the planned Medieval village. The parish church and 21 buildings are listed as being of significant historical interest.

Listed cottages in the Main Street of Wheldrake

== Politics ==
Historically part of the East Riding of Yorkshire, Wheldrake was transferred to the newly formed North Yorkshire county in the 1974 local government reorganisation. It became part of the City of York unitary authority in 1996. Before 1996 it had been part of the Selby district.

=== Local level ===
Wheldrake has a non-party political parish council.

The parish is part of the Wheldrake ward of York, represented on York City Council by Christian Vassie who is a member of the Liberal Democrat party.

Wheldrake Election Results 2023
Candidate	Party	Votes
Alan Nathaniel Crowe	Conservative	464
Will Dyson	Green Party	56
David Skaith	Labour Party	274
Christian Maurice Vassie	Liberal Democrat	603

Turnout	42.4%

=== National level ===
Wheldrake became part of the newly created York Outer parliamentary constituency in the 2010 general election. Before that it was part of the Selby constituency.

General election 2024: York Outer
Party	Candidate	Votes	%	±%
Labour	Luke Charters	23,161	45.3	+15.4
Conservative	Julian Sturdy	13,770	26.9	−22.7
Reform	John Crispin-Bailey	5,912	11.6	+11.1
Liberal Democrats	Andrew Hollyer	5,496	10.8	−7.9
Green	Michael Kearney	2,212	4.3	+4.3
Yorkshire	David Eadington	260	0.5	New
Independent	Keith Hayden	141	0.3	New
Independent	Hal Mayne	88	0.2	New
Independent	Darren Burrows	66	0.1	New
Majority		9,391	18.4	N/A
Turnout		51,106	67.3	−8.3
Registered electors		76,228		
Labour gain from Conservative		Swing	+19.1	

Selby Constituency Election Results 2005
Candidate	Party	Votes
Cuthbertson, Ian	Liberal Democrat	7,770
Grogan, John	Labour	22,623
Menzies, Mark	Conservative	22,156

== Culture, media and sport ==
The Wheldrake Singers is a local choral group that presents two or three concerts each year. They sing mostly Baroque works and are usually accompanied by an accomplished orchestra of local musicians. The local public house, The Wenlock, closed in May 2011 but has since reopened. There is usually an annual exhibition by local artists and crafts people and two or three accept commissions for watercolours. The Wheldrake Recreational Association provides a venue for sports and social activities and St Helen's Church promotes a number of Christian social groups. A mobile library visits every two weeks and there is a children's playground with basketball facilities for older children. Local clubs use the tennis, football and cricket facilities at the village hall. Swallow Hall is the local golf course and there are two angling lakes, Raker Lakes and Westerly Lake. Public footpaths through the fields are maintained by York City council. The Wheldrake Woods and Wheldrake Ings are also popular with walkers. The parish magazine Parish News is circulated to six hundred homes in the village each month and has a wealth of information about local interests. The radio stations are BBC Radio York and Hits Radio East Yorkshire & North Lincolnshire and the local newspaper is The York Press.

== Business ==
The Millfield industrial estate at the western approaches to the village has seven units engaged in light industry and commerce. Farmers and a number of other self-employed people, including decorators, builder, joiners and plumbers run businesses from home. A pub (The Wenlock Arms), a village shop with a post office, a hairdresser, and undertaker are to be found along the Main Street, whilst a local gardener - Chris Taylor Gardening can be found down The Cranbrooks. There used to be the Alice Hawthorne public house but this has since been turned into a private house. It was named after a racehorse of the 1840s. There also used to be a purpose built Fish & Chip shop but closed due to lack of use..

== Education ==
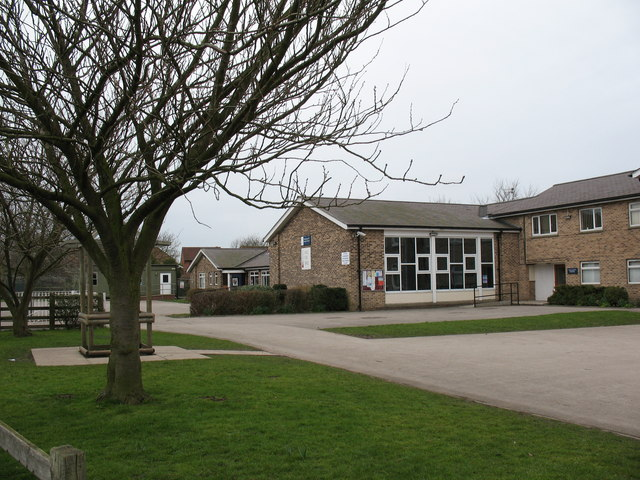
Wheldrake Primary School

Wheldrake with Thorganby Church of England (Aided) Primary School caters for children up to the age of 11. The school moved to its present location on North Lane in 1973 from White Rose House, which can be found next door to the Church on Main Street. The school has recently constructed an extension as the catchment area has seen an increase in the number of younger children and the original building became too small. Older pupils usually attend Fulford School in York.

== Notable people ==
- Carla Woodcock (born 1998), actress (Free Rein, Ackley Bridge)
