= Osbaldwick railway station =

Short-lived railway station in Osbaldwick, North Yorkshire

Osbaldwick
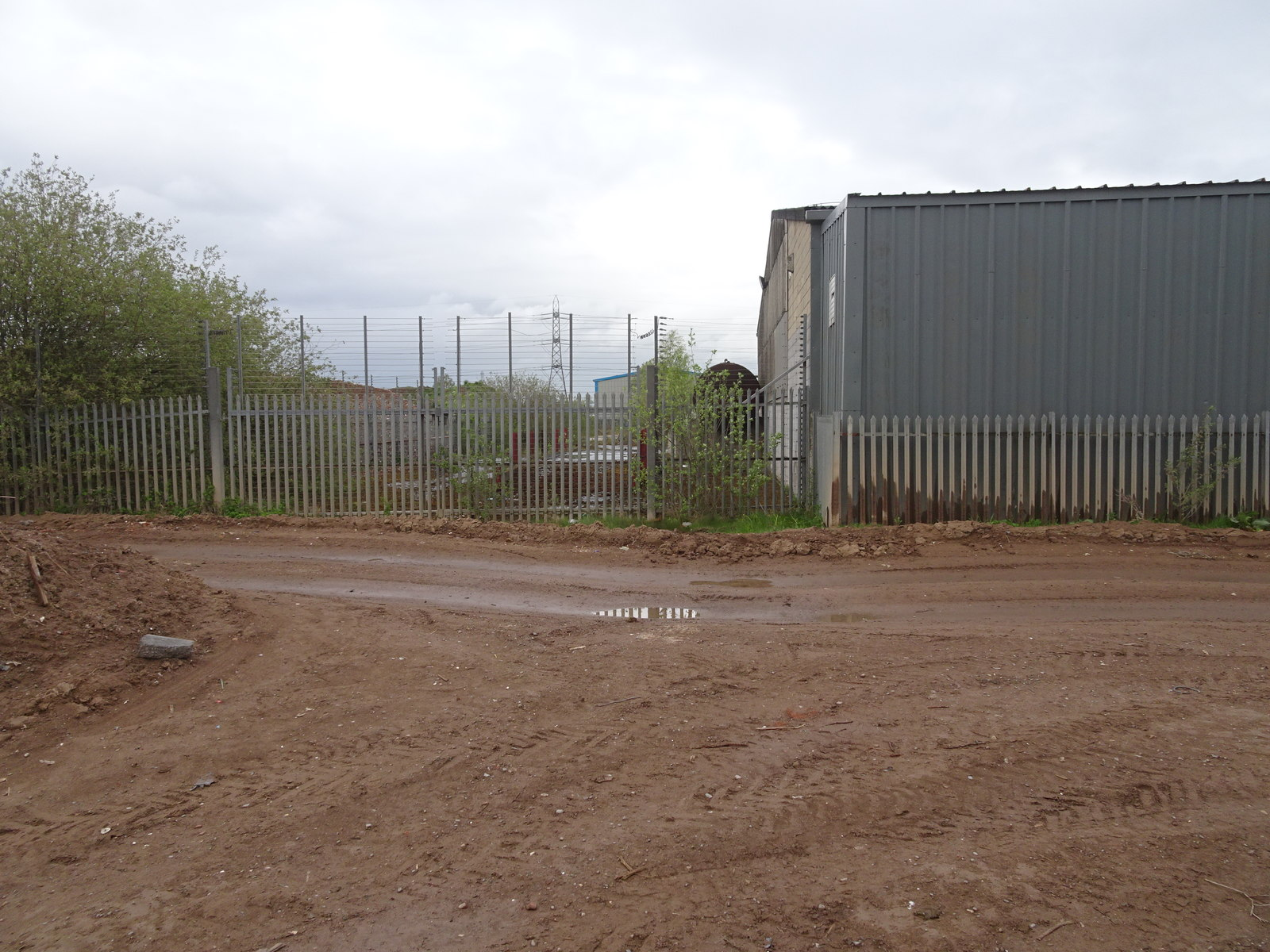
- The site of the station in 2019

General information
- Location: Osbaldwick, North Yorkshire; England
- Coordinates: 53.9623°N 1.0295°W
- Grid reference: SE637522
- Platforms: 1

Other information
- Status: Disused

History
- Original company: Derwent Valley Light Railway
- Pre-grouping: Derwent Valley Light Railway
- Post-grouping: Derwent Valley Light Railway

Key dates
- 21 July 1913: Opened
- 1 March 1915: Closed to passengers
- 1981: Closed to freight
Location

Osbaldwick railway station served the village of Osbaldwick, North Yorkshire, England, from 1913 to 1981 on the Derwent Valley Light Railway.

== History ==
The station opened on 21 July 1913 by the Derwent Valley Light Railway. It closed to passengers on 1 March 1915 and to goods in 1981.

== Present & Future ==
Osbaldwick station was demolished shortly after closure and replaced by an industrial estate home to warehouses of local businesses such as Brew York.

Preceding station	Historical railways	Following station
York (Layerthorpe); Line and station closed	Derwent Valley Light Railway	Murton Lane; Line and station closed
