= Elvington (DVLR) railway station =

Disused railway station in Elvington, North Yorkshire, England

Elvington
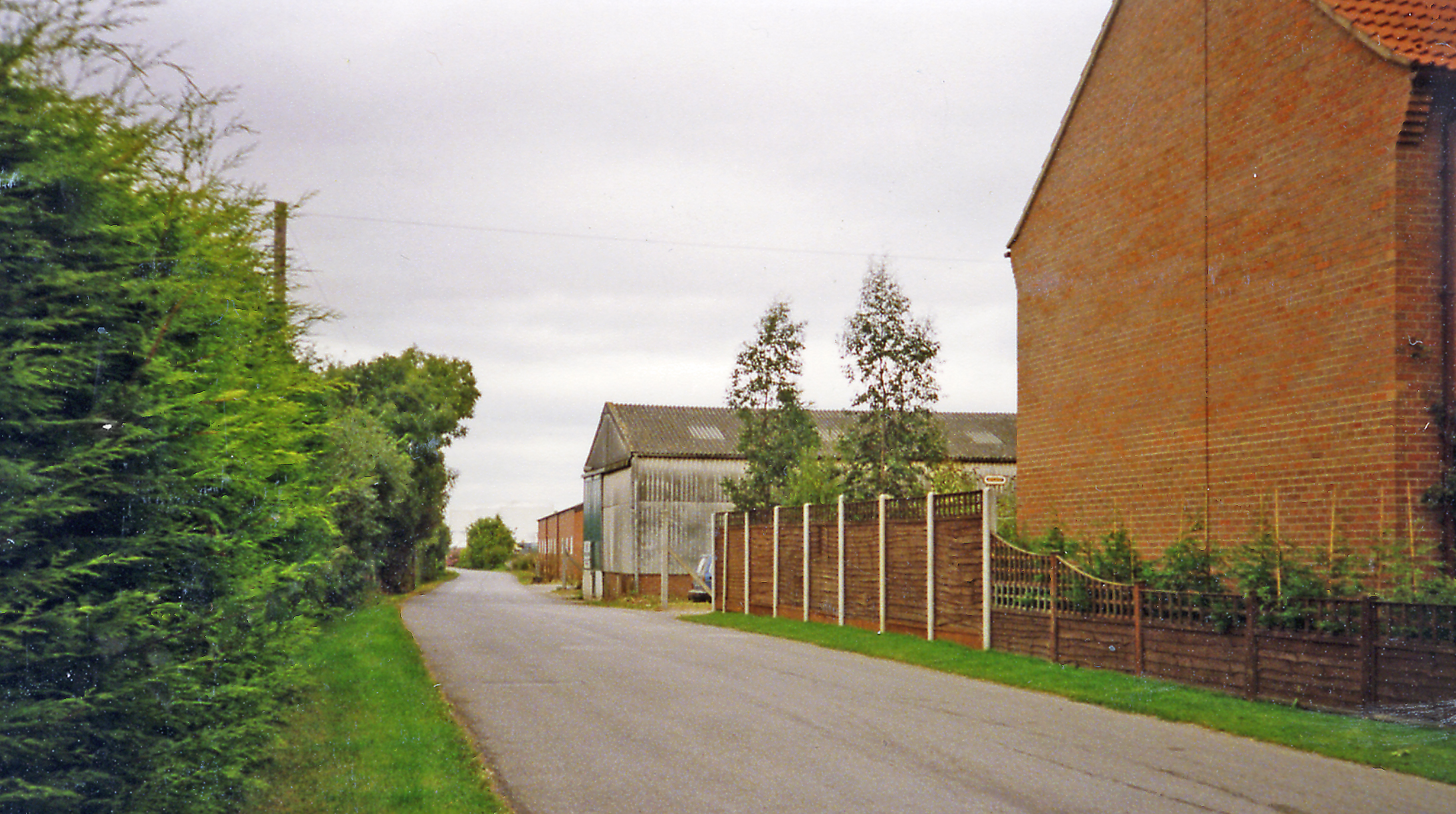
- The site of the station, looking north towards York, in 1993

General information
- Location: Elvington, North Yorkshire; England
- Coordinates: 53.9244°N 0.9508°W
- Grid reference: SE690418
- Platforms: 1

Other information
- Status: Disused

History
- Original company: Derwent Valley Light Railway

Key dates
- 21 July 1913: Opened
- 1 September 1926: Closed to passengers
- 30 September 1972: Closed to freight
Location

Elvington railway station served the village of Elvington, North Yorkshire, England from 1913 to 1972 on the Derwent Valley Light Railway.

== History ==
The station opened on 21 July 1913 on the Derwent Valley Light Railway. The station seems to have had a similar layout to that at Dunnington upon its openening- that being a platform for passengers with a passing loop and long siding as well as a short spur into a loading dock. By 1949, the station's goods facilities had expanded to three sidings.

The platform was accessed from the B1228, the road that lead to Elvington village, orginally over half a mile away from the station. The long distance lead to an experimental bus service being trialed in 1914, ran by a local gentleman named Mr A. Dawson. Bus services ran on Mondays, Tuesdays, Thursdays and Saturdays though the service had low patronage and was subsequently abandoned.

There was one rather unusual but steady form of traffic - local anglers. They made use of the station on Saturday afternoons and were issued special tickets. A local observer once commented they saw as many as 20 anglers making their way to the river at one time.

Preceding station	Historical railways	Following station
Dunnington for Kexby; Line and station closed	Derwent Valley Light Railway	Wheldrake; Line and station closed
