= Cottingwith railway station =

Disused railway station in Cottingwith, East Riding of Yorkshire, England

Cottingwith
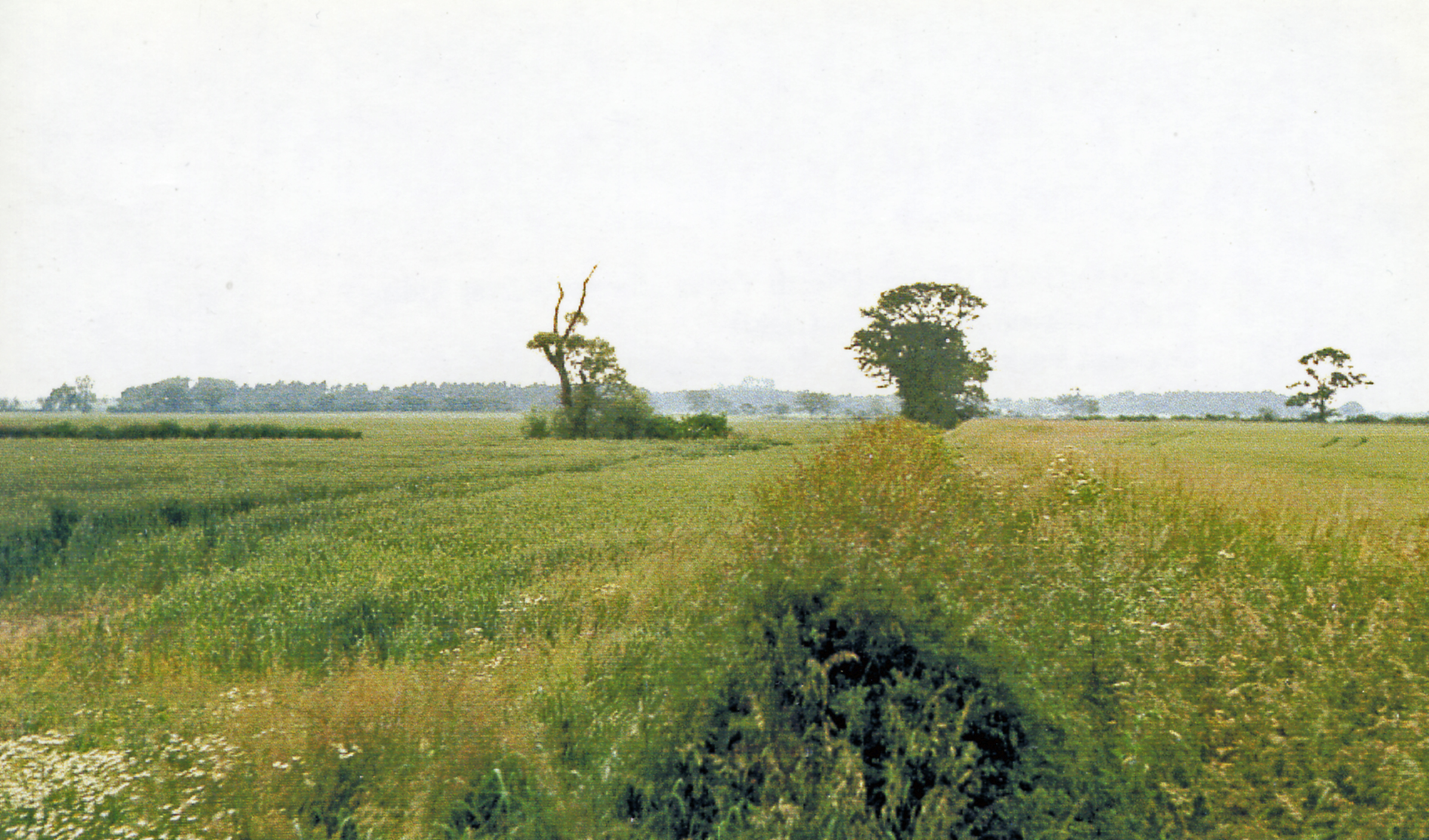
- The site of the station in 1988

General information
- Location: East Cottingwith, East Riding of Yorkshire; England
- Coordinates: 53.8743°N 0.9718°W
- Grid reference: SE677425
- Platforms: 1

Other information
- Status: Disused

History
- Original company: Derwent Valley Light Railway

Key dates
- 21 July 1913: Opened
- 1 September 1926: Closed to passengers
- January 1965: Closed to freight
Location

Cottingwith railway station served the village of East Cottingwith, East Riding of Yorkshire, England from 1913 to 1965 on the Derwent Valley Light Railway.

== History ==
The station opened on 21 July 1913 on the Derwent Valley Light Railway. The station was originally to be called West Cottingwith, though when it opened it was simply named Cottingwith. The station facilities upon opening were as follows: A loop, a platform, a station building built in the typical DVLR style and a loading dock. The passenger catchment area was limited, as West Cottingwith was a mile from the station and to reach East Cottingwith, passengers would have to take a ferry across the River Derwent. Safe to say the end of passenger services had little impact on the local communities.

Despite the rural nature of the station, it played host to one of very few fatal incidents to happen on the DVLR. On the 11th August 1937, mother and daughter Mrs Edith and Miss Elizabeth Cape's car collided with the daily goods train. Mrs Edith died instantly but Miss Elizabeth lived a few days longer in a local hospital, before succumbing to her injuries.

For most of Cottingwith's life, agriculture was the staple. However, during WW2 and for a time after, the Escrick Forward Filling Depot (FFD5) was built and operated north west of the road crossing. The depot was used for the storage of mustard gas and preparation of weapons for combat- despite chemical weapons being banned under the Geneva Conventions.

The facilities of FFD5 consisted of storage sheds, a bonding shed and a charging shed. There were also a pair of underground storage tanks capable of holding up to 500 tons of liquid gas. To bring materials in and out a siding was laid out of the loop facing towards Cliff Common. After WW2, weapon charging ceased and over the following years gas was transported out, though the site remained contaminated until the 1990s.

After closure to passengers, the station was converted into a house for the price of £18 and 15 shillings, though the building was demolished at some point during the intervening years. Nothing now remains of the station.

Preceding station	Historical railways	Following station
Wheldrake; Line and station closed	Derwent Valley Light Railway	Thorganby; Line and station closed
