= Derwent Valley Light Railway =

Railway line in Yorkshire, England

The Blackberry Line
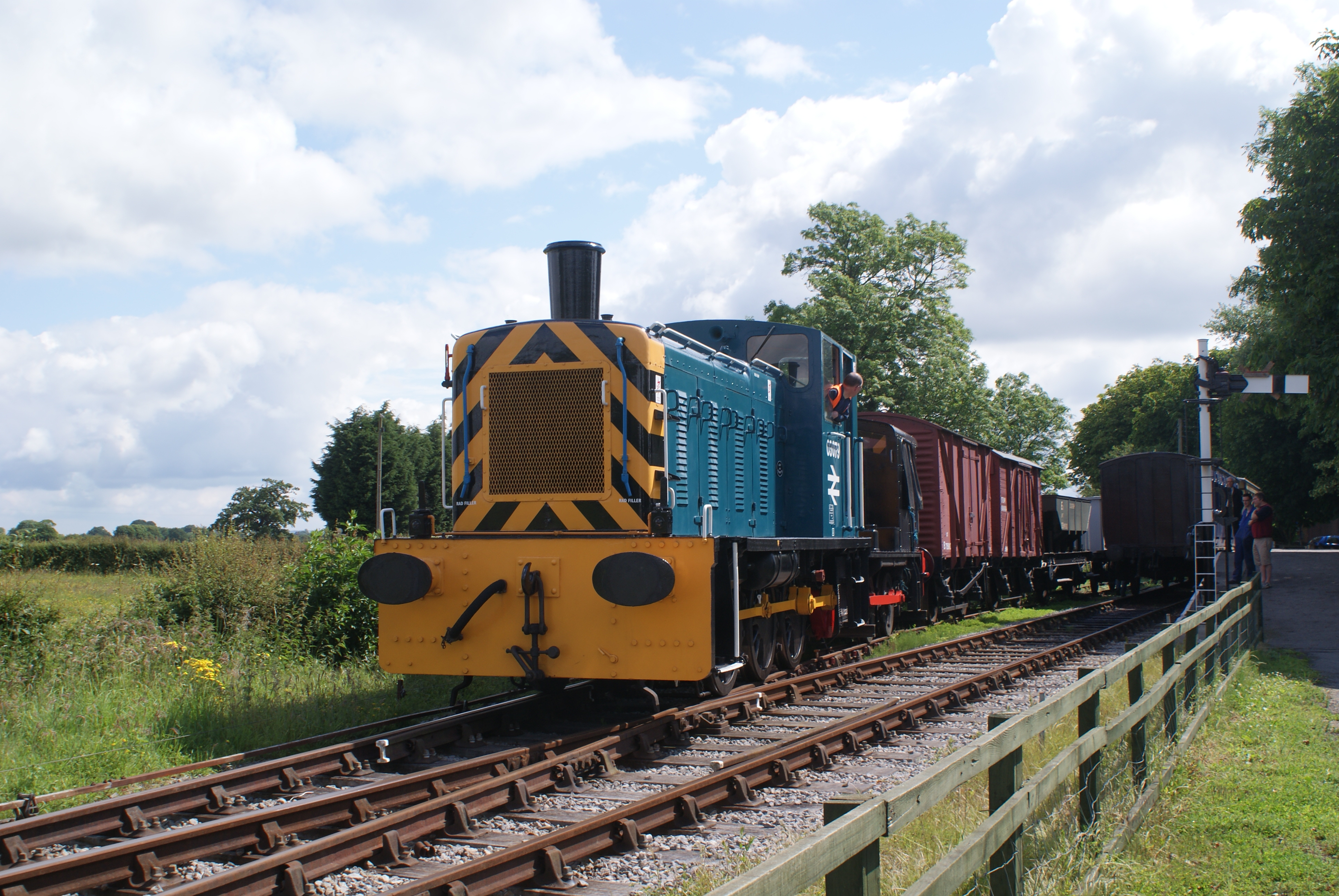
- Train shunting on the DVLR
- Locale: England
- Terminus: Murton
- Coordinates: 53.9629°N 1.0096°W

Commercial operations
- Name: Derwent Valley Light Railway
- Built by: Derwent Valley Light Railway (DVLR)
- Original gauge: 4 ft 8 1/2 in (1,435 mm) standard gauge

Preserved operations
- Operated by: Derwent Valley Light Railway Society
- Stations: 1
- Length: 1/2 mile (0.80 km)
- Preserved gauge: 4 ft 8 1/2 in (1,435 mm) standard gauge

Commercial history
- Opened: 29 October 1912
- Closed: 27 September 1981

Preservation history
- 1985: Light railway order transferred to Murton section of line
- 1990: Great Yorkshire Preservation Society moves to Murton
- 1991: Wheldrake station obtained
- 1992: Railway converted to Sustrans cycle track between York and Osbaldwick
- 1993: Railway reopens
- 2013: DVLR marks 100 years of original full route opening

The Derwent Valley Light Railway (DVLR) was a privately owned standard-gauge railway in North Yorkshire, England, and was unusual in that it was never nationalised, remaining as a private operation all its life. It ran between Layerthorpe on the outskirts of York to Cliffe Common near Selby. It opened in two stages, in 1912 and 1913, and closed in sections between 1965 and 1981. Between 1977 and 1979, passenger steam trains operated between Layerthorpe and Dunnington, as an attempt to capitalise on the increased tourism the National Railway Museum was bringing to York. Unfortunately this failed, mostly due to Dunnington hardly being a destination beyond what the railway lead to. In 1993 a small section was re-opened as part of the Yorkshire Museum of Farming at Murton.

The line gained its nickname of The Blackberry Line in the days when it used to transport blackberries to markets in Yorkshire and London.

== History ==
The railway was authorised by the Derwent Valley Light Railway Order 1902.

The south end of the railway, from Wheldrake to Cliffe Common, was opened on 29 October 1912, with the remainder of the line opening on 19 July 1913. Although it was constructed primarily as a freight line, passenger trains were introduced from 1913, and during the First World War it was used as a diversionary route by the North Eastern Railway between York and Selby. Passenger services ended in 1926, though freight traffic prospered through the Second World War.

In 1923, most British railway companies were grouped into four large companies, with the nearby North Eastern Railway becoming part of the London and North Eastern Railway. However, the DVLR remained independent, and continued to do so even after nationalisation in 1948.

By 1961 normal traffic consisted of one return journey per day. A sympathetic group of guests described the line as "a cross between Emmett and The Titfield Thunderbolt". Their photographs and text portrayed a museum piece operating in harmony with staff, timeless practice and local wildlife.

In 1964, British Railways closed the Selby to Driffield Line, meaning that the junction at Cliffe Common became redundant. With the connection to Selby now gone, the DVLR was left isolated at its southern end. The line was subsequently run from the Layerthorpe end, but traffic generated by the southern section of the track was light, so the line was closed between Wheldrake and Cliffe Common in 1965. The section between Wheldrake and Elvington followed in 1968. Elvington was closed in 1972, leaving only about 4 miles (6 km) of track between Layerthorpe and Dunnington on the outskirts of York. Two special trains were run along the whole length of the line in January 1965, being the last passenger trains to do so.

=== Final years ===
In 1976, the company decided to operate steam trains between Layerthorpe and Dunnington, which was the entire length of the line at that time after the closure of the line to Elvington. This was done in conjunction with the then new National Railway Museum. A regular summer service started in 1977, with J72 0-6-0T locomotive number 69023 Joem (now owned by North Eastern Railway Preservation Group or NELPG) operating the services. It was popular at first, but by 1979 there were not enough passengers for continued operation, and the service ceased. This was mainly due to Dunnington having little in the way of attractions, being nothing really more than where the railway led. The railway continued to carry occasional freight trains to Dunnington until 1981, when the grain driers at Dunnington closed and the last major source of freight for the line was gone. As well, the railway was in need of major renovation: the majority of the rails and buildings dated from 1913. The owners decided that the demand for freight failed to justify any restoration and closed the line down. The last train ran on 27 September 1981 and the compqany restructured into a property holding company. In 1984 the company, then called Derwent Valley Holdings, became Derwent London, which is now a multimillion-pound property investment and development company.

The Foss Islands Branch Line, to which the Derwent Valley Light Railway connected at Layerthorpe, was subsequently closed in 1989 and lifted in 1992. The trackbed was converted into a foot and cycle path, known as the Foss Fairy Trail, a few years later.

== Preservation ==
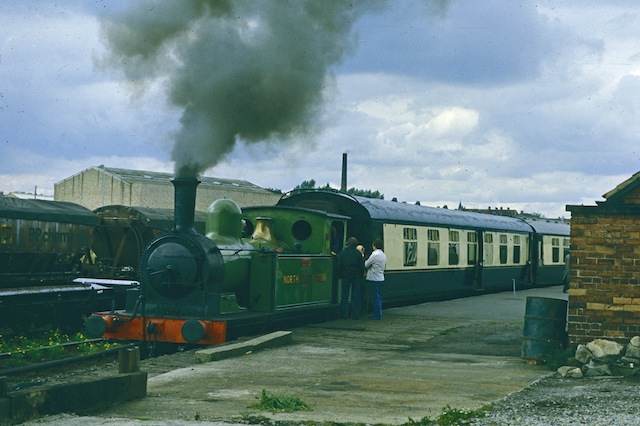
ex-LNER J72 no. 69023 Joem at Layerthorpe in September 1977

Until 1990, a small preservation group, the Great Yorkshire Railway Preservation Society, was originally based at Starbeck near Harrogate with the intention of reopening a stretch of the Leeds to Northallerton line. When this closed, the society members relocated to the Yorkshire Museum of Farming, and started to rebuild approximately 3/4 mile (1.2 km) of track towards York, including the section under the York by-pass. The railway re-opened in 1993 and in 1997 the building at Wheldrake Station was moved to serve as the preserved line's station.

The line now runs a mixture of nine diesel locomotives on Sundays and bank holidays.

A mentioned, the track-bed from Layerthorpe to Osbaldwick, along with most of the former Foss Islands Branch Line in York, has been converted to a foot and cycle path, part of Sustrans route 66.

Whilst future extension of the line towards Osbaldwick may be possible, as of 2026 there are currently still no formal plans for this, and this would require building a new level crossing and also the demolition of all or part of the industrial estate built on the station's site following closure.

== Route ==
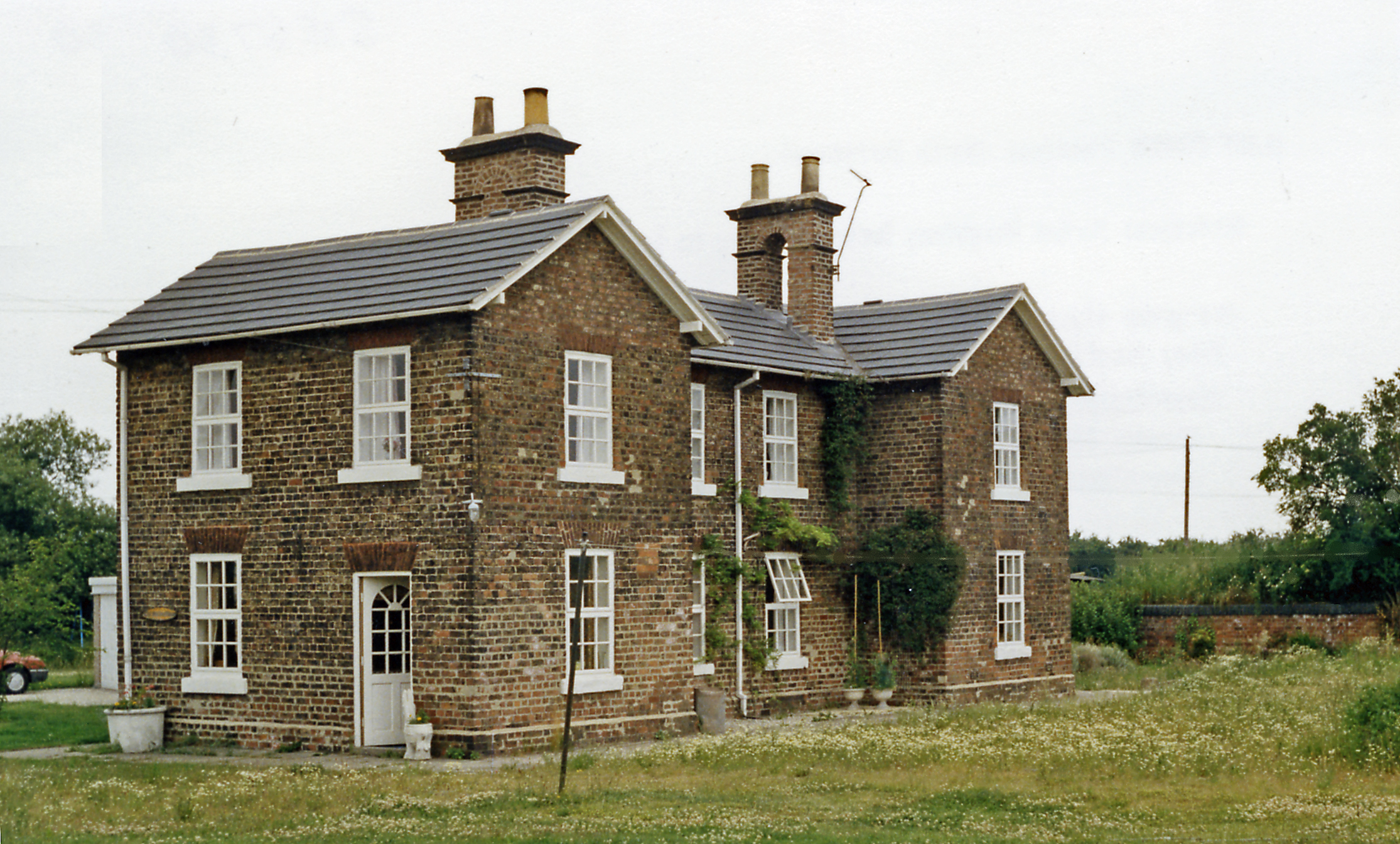
Former station at Cliffe Common, 1988

The original railway was 16 miles (26 km) long, and served the following stations:

- Layerthorpe
- Osbaldwick
- Murton Lane
- Dunnington Halt
- Dunnington (for Kexby)
- Elvington
- Wheldrake
- Cottingwith
- Thorganby
- Skipwith
- Cliffe Common (DVLR), which connected with the NER/LNER/BR Selby to Driffield Line

== Rolling stock 1913–1981 ==
Initially trains were worked by locomotives owned by the North Eastern Railway (from 1923 LNER and from 1948 British Railways).

The railway purchased two railcars in the 1920s to operate a passenger service and the table below lists the stock owned by the company in the 1920s

Description	Wheel Arrangement	Notes
Rail Lorry	0-4-0	Built by The British Four-wheel Drive Tractor Lorry Super Engineering Company – trialed unsuccessfully in 1923
Railbus (2)	0-4-0	Ford chassis with body built by C.H.Roe of Crossgates (Leeds). Operated 1924–1926 when road bus competition saw them sold to County Donegal Railways.
Sentinel	0-4-0T	Works no 6076. Operated on DVLR 1925 – 1929 before being sold to Summerson and Sons of Darlington. Scrapped c1971.

Between 1929 and 1969 the line was again worked by main line locomotives.

In 1969 the DVLR decided to buy two ex-British Rail Class 04 shunters to operate services rather than hiring in British Rail Class 03 locomotives. The table below lists the locomotives owned by the DVLR

Number/Name	Wheel Arrangement	Notes	Image
1 Lord Wenlock	0-6-0DM	Former BR Class 04 D2298. Purchased 1969 – sold in 1982 to Buckinghamshire Railway Centre.	
D2245	0-6-0DM	Former BR Class 04 D2245. Purchased 1969 – sold in 1978 to the Shackerstone Railway and has since been relocated back to the DVLR	
D2329	0-6-0DM	Former BR Class 04 bought for spares and subsequently scrapped in 1969	
Claude Thompson	0-4-0DM	John Fowler built engine – works number 4210142 (1958) purchased from British Pipeline agency in 1978 and sold in 1982 to Buckinghamshire Railway Centre.	
69023 Joem	0-6-0T	British Railways built locomotive of North Eastern Railway Class J72. Operated line 1977–1979 when it was sold back to the previous owner's family.	

Joem was purchased to run the aforementioned short lived steam train passenger operation.

== Rolling stock 1993–present ==
The following rolling stock is owned by the preservation group as of January 2021:

=== Diesel Locomotives ===
Number & Name	Builder/type	Wheel arrangement	Year built	Livery	Status	Image
03079	British Rail Class 03	0-6-0DM	1960	BR Blue with Wasp Stripes	Operational	
D2245	British Rail Class 04	0-6-0DM	1956	Grey with Wasp Stripes	Operational	
08528	British Rail Class 08	0-6-0DE	1959	BR Green with Late Crest	Operational	
327964 "British Sugar York"	Ruston & Hornsby 165	0-4-0DM	1953	Green with Warning Chevrons	Operational	
466630 "Octavius Atkinson"	Ruston & Hornsby 88DS	4wDM	1962	Green	Operational	
441934 "Rowntree No.3"	Ruston & Hornsby 88DS	4wDM	1960	Lined Green with Rowntree's Lettering	Operational	
421419	Ruston & Hornsby 88DS	4wDM	1958	Green	Cosmetically restored	
417892 "Jim"	Ruston & Hornsby 48DS	4wDM	1959	Green with Wasp Stripes	Operational	
DC2164	Drewry Car Co.	0-4-0DM	1941	Green	Operational	
4100005 "Churchill"	John Fowler & Co.	0-4-0DM	1947	Black	Operational	

There is also a steam locomotive on the preserved line, though it is under restoration. This is Manning Wardle Works No. 1795, built in 1903 specially for the Albion works of T W Ward in Sheffield though by 1913 it had left the Albion Works and moved elsewhere. The locomotive was preserved in August 1969 and spent many years bouncing between preservation organisations until it arrived at the DVLR in 2022 where it is hoped that she will be restores to working order once again.

Carriages

- North Eastern Railway 4-wheel coach No. 1214/2462 built in 1890. (Under repair)
- B&W Engineering 4-wheel observation coach No. BW1000 "Sylvia" built in 2003. (Operational)
- Southern Railway 4-wheel PMV Luggage Van No. S1367S built in 1939. (under restoration)
- British Railways Mk1 BSK No. 35405 built in 1962 (Operational)

Wagons

- British Railways Standard 20-ton Brake Van No. B951144 built in 1951. (Operational)
- British Railways 12 ton Box Van No. 775810 built in 1957. (Operational)
- British Railways 12 ton Box Van No. 762112 built in 1954. (Operational)
- Chas Roberts Shell Mex and BP Tank Wagon No. 5081 built in 1938. (Operational)
- NCB Coal Wagon K264. No. B291264. (Operational)
- Great Western Railway Box Van No. W95166 built in 1915. (Operational)
- London and North Eastern Railway 20 ton Plate Wagon No. 239666 built in 1940. (Operational)
- LMS hopper wagon chassis. Date and number unknown (Operational)

== In art and culture ==
A View of York (from Tang Hall Bridge)

In 1952, the artist L. S. Lowry painted three scenes of York as a commission from York Art Gallery. One of the pictures, entitled A View of York (from Tang Hall Bridge) depicts playing fields next to the railway, with a cooling tower (since demolished) and York Minster in the background. The painting was sold to a private collector, but was loaned to the art gallery in 2015 for temporary display.

In 2013, York soprano Rebecca Newman, with the enthusiastic participation of DVLR staff and a cast of children and adults from the theatre company We Are Theatre, with the fixed equipment and rolling stock of the railway, and Maggi the puppy, created her version of the song Wonderful Dream (Holidays are Coming) as a charity Christmas video, on YouTube. It was very well reviewed and by November 2015 received over 200,000 views on YouTube.
