= Cliffe Common railway station =

Disused railway station in North Yorkshire, England

Cliffe Common
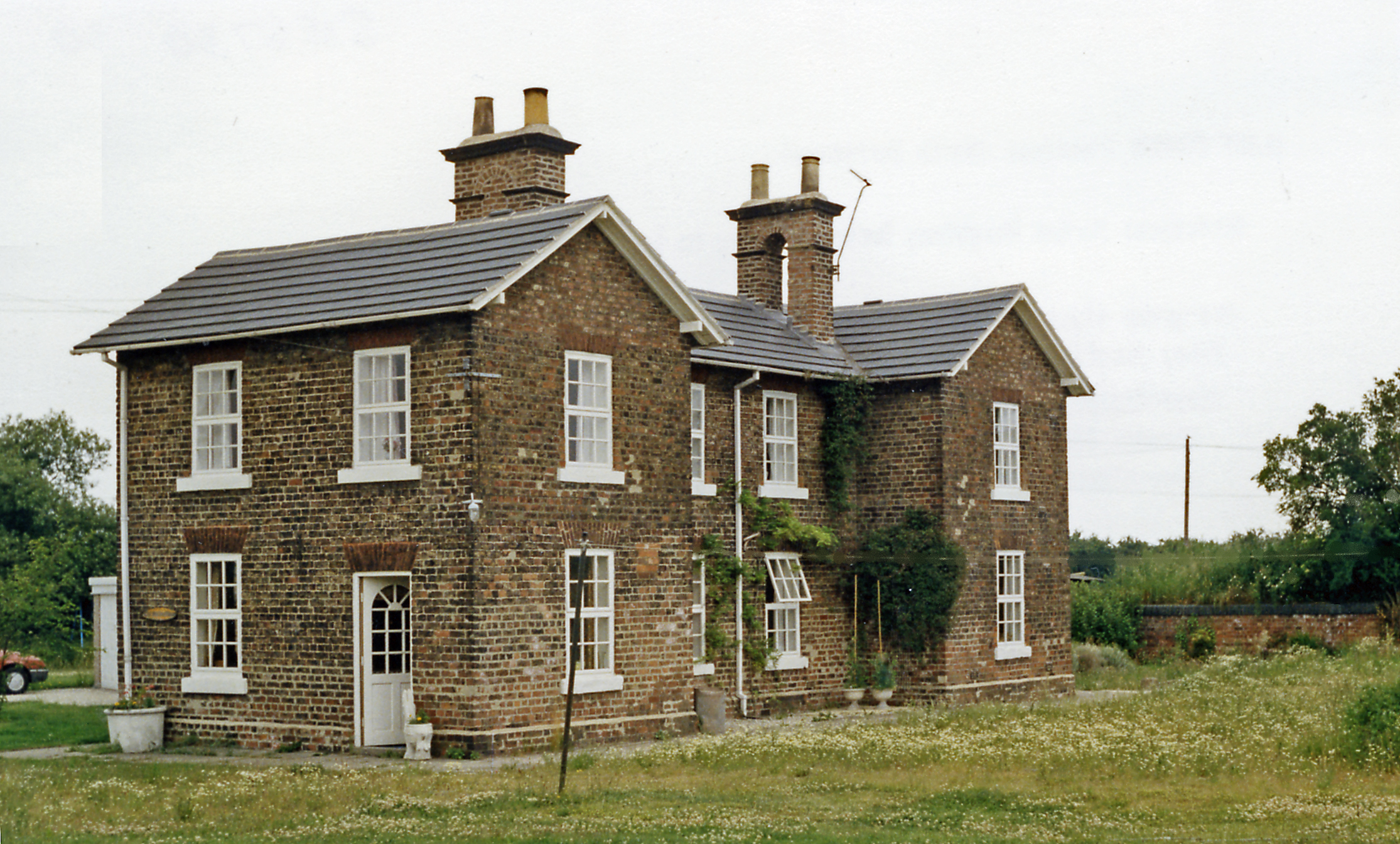
- Cliffe Common's station building in 1988

General information
- Location: Cliffe, North Yorkshire; England
- Coordinates: 53.7972°N 0.9895°W
- Grid reference: SE666339
- Platforms: 3 (2 BR, 1 DVLR)

Other information
- Status: Disused

History
- Original company: York and North Midland Railway
- Pre-grouping: North Eastern Railway (UK) Derwent Valley Light Railway
- Post-grouping: LNER British Railways (North Eastern) Derwent Valley Light Railway

Key dates
- 1 August 1848: Opened as Cliff Common Gate
- October 1864: Name changed to Cliffe Common
- 21st July 1913: DVLR passenger services commence
- 1st September 1926: DVLR passenger services cease
- 20th September 1954: British Rail passenger services cease
- 28 January 1964: Station closes completely
Location

Cliffe Common railway station, also known as Cliff Common, formerly Cliff Common Gate, served the village of Cliffe, Selby, England from 1848 to 1964 on the Selby-Driffield line, and was the southern terminus of the Derwent Valley Light Railway.

== History ==
The station (may have) opened on 1 August 1848 by the York and North Midland Railway- it did not appear on timetables until late 1851. The station was situated on the east side of Lowmoor Road. The station was originally known as Cliff Common Gate, although the 'Gate' was dropped in October 1864. A second platform was built in 1889 when the line was doubled. The goods yard consisted of three sidings, one serving a cattle dock behind the up platform, a further siding on the opposite side of the line behind the down platform and a private siding called Malt Kiln siding. When the DVLR station opened on 21 July 1913, it effectively took over the sidings on the down side of the station. The main freight handled at the station was 1187 tons of potatoes, 665 tons of hay/clover and 399 tons of vegetables. The station closed to passengers on 20 September 1954 although it was still used for excursions until 1957.

The station closed to goods traffic on 28 January 1964. It was the junction station for the Derwent Valley Light Railway which opened for goods traffic in 1912 (initially only between Cliff Common and Skipwith) and passenger traffic in 1913. Passenger services were withdrawn on 1 September 1926 (though many of the passenger trains terminated at Skipwith, indicating that passenger numbers were low) but goods traffic continued until November 1965. Subsequently the line was abandoned and the track was lifted.

Interestingly, for a time Cliff Common was home to the preserved Easingwold Railway coach. It was stored at the station in one of the down facing sidings owned by the DVLR. It had been bought by the DVLR upon ER's withdrawal of passenger services in 1947. The coach was later moved to Elvington after the Wheldrake-Cliff Common section of the Derwent Valley Light Railway was closed, before being bought by the Scottish Railway Preservation Society and relocated to Chasewater where it was subsequently restored and is located at the Chasewater Railway

Preceding station	Disused railways	Following station
Duffield Gate; Line and station closed	York and North Midland Railway; Selby-Driffield line	Selby; Line closed, station open
Skipwith; Line and station closed	Derwent Valley Light Railway	Terminus
