= Dunnington for Kexby railway station =

Disused railway station in North Yorkshire, England

Dunnington for Kexby
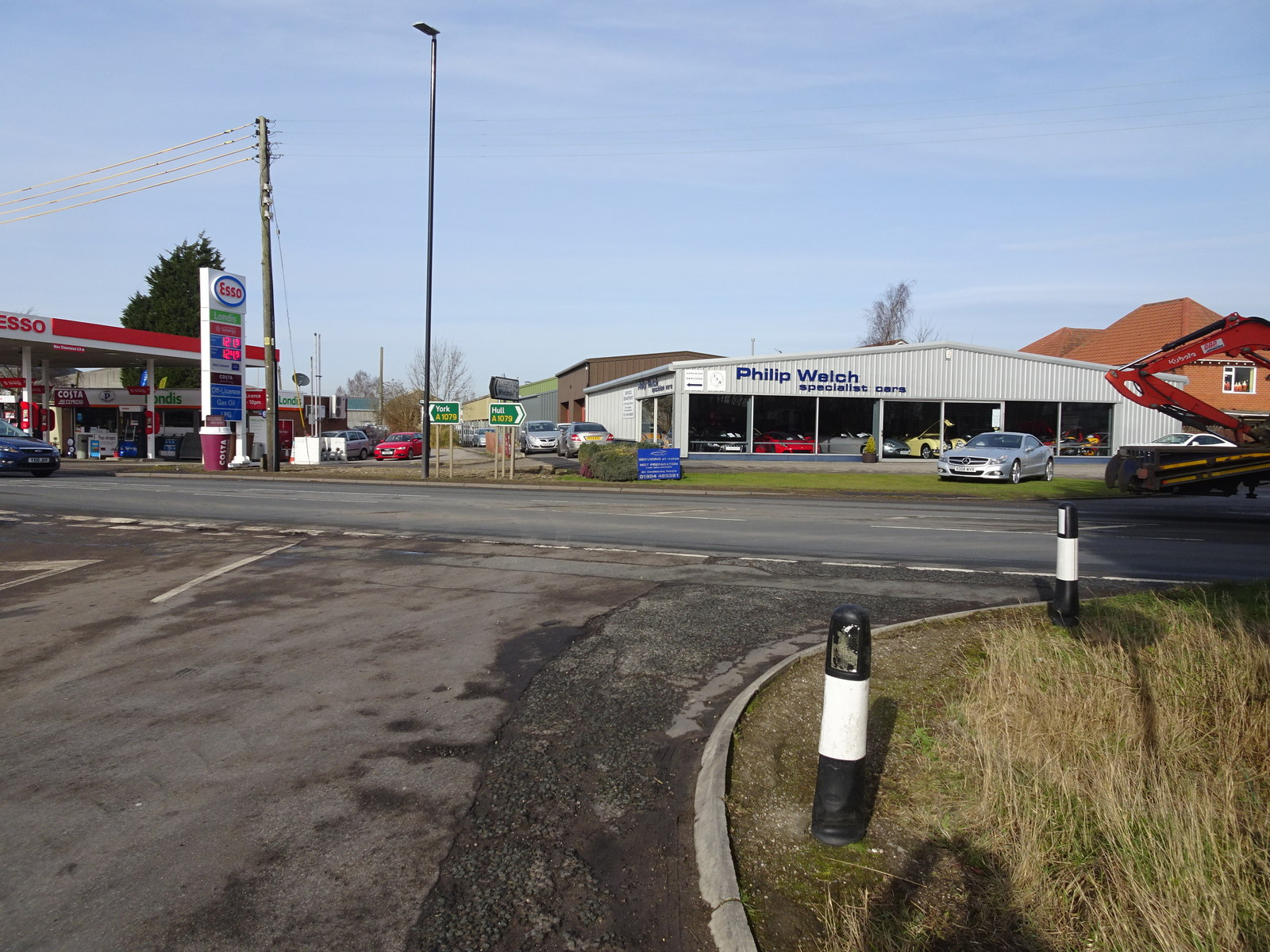
- The site of the station, looking northwest, in 2018

General information
- Location: Dunnington, North Yorkshire; England
- Coordinates: 53.9549°N 0.9727°W
- Grid reference: SE675514
- Platforms: 1

Other information
- Status: Disused

History
- Original company: Derwent Valley Light Railway

Key dates
- 21 July 1913: Opened
- 1 September 1926: Closed to passengers
- 1981: Closed to freight
Location

Dunnington for Kexby railway station served the village of Dunnington, North Yorkshire, England from 1913 to 1981 by the Derwent Valley Light Railway.

== History ==
The station opened on 21 July 1913 by the Derwent Valley Light Railway. It closed to passengers on 1 September 1926 and to freight, along with the line as a whole, in 1981.

Preceding station	Historical railways	Following station
Dunnington Halt; Line and station closed	Derwent Valley Light Railway	Elvington; Line and station closed
