= Yorkshire Museum of Farming =

Coordinates: 53.96105°N 1.00875°W

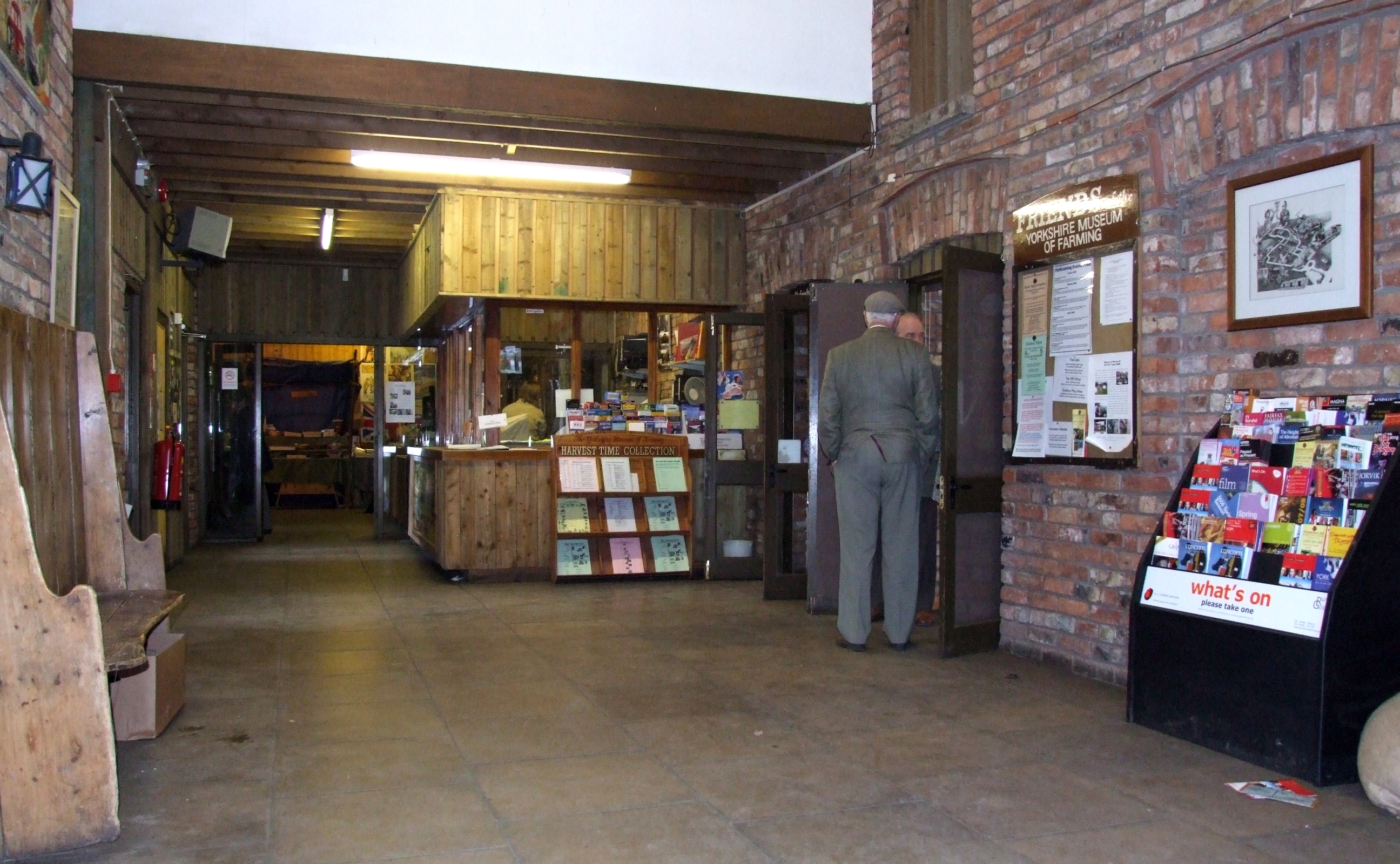
- Main entrance area

- Location within North Yorkshire
- Established: 1982
- Location: Murton Park, York, England
- Type: Farming Museum, Living History Centre
- Website: http://www.murtonpark.co.uk/

The Yorkshire Museum of Farming is located in Murton Park near York in England. It is housed on a grass field site of approximately 14 acres (5.7 ha), and is the only museum in the district specifically dedicated to the subject of farming. In the autumn of 2010, the museum was awarded full accreditation status by the Museums, Libraries and Archives Council.

The museum has built up a large collection of artefacts that illustrate the history of farm mechanisation. The collection also contains domestic items and other documentary material relating to the social structure of rural life in the area. Events are held throughout the year relating to rural and farming themes. There is also a children's play area and a cafe.

The site is also home to the last surviving stretch of the Derwent Valley Light Railway, part of whose archive is also in the museum's collection.

The museum shares the site with the Danelaw Centre for Living History. Living history facilities include a mock Roman fort called Brigantium, which is a disguised outdoor classroom designed to cater for up to 65 children at a time. There are also buildings dedicated to the Tudor and Viking ages, and an early medieval village and how they farmed the land centuries ago.

== History and collection ==
The museum opened in 1982. It was originally designed to house a growing collection of farm machinery that had been donated by various farms from North and East Yorkshire to the East Yorkshire Farm Machinery Preservation Society and stored at Burton Constable.

The core of the collection focuses on the development of the mechanisation of farming during the nineteenth and twentieth centuries. A wide variety of items are on display, divided between two main exhibition galleries, the Four Seasons Gallery and the Livestock Gallery. A number of rare breeds of livestock are kept on site, including a Toggenburg goat, 'Jeffrey', who has been made an honorary member and mascot for the RAF 609 (West Riding) squadron since March 2010.

The Four Seasons Gallery looks at the farming year, and the different practices and tools which are used across the four seasons. In 2013 a new exhibition opened; Feeding the Nation: A Celebration of the Women's Land Army is located on the upper floor of the Four Seasons Building. Funded by the Heritage Lottery fund, the exhibition showcases some of the museum's rich Land Army collection and includes audio points featuring interviews with ex-members and film footage.

The Livestock building considers the rearing and farming of a variety of types of livestock. This also includes a display of the contents of the James Herriot's (Alf Wight) veterinary surgery.

The museum is also home to a large manuscript archive which can be viewed on appointment. Subjects covered in the archive include: manorial documents, agricultural machinery manufacturers' accounts, the Women's Land Army, the Derwent Valley Light Railway, the Cleveland Bay Horse Society, and a huge array of miscellaneous accounts, correspondence, certificates, photographs, maps and prints. There is also a sizeable library on-site which contains numerous historic journals, manuals, text books, and magazines. This can be accessed by appointment.

== Farming families ==
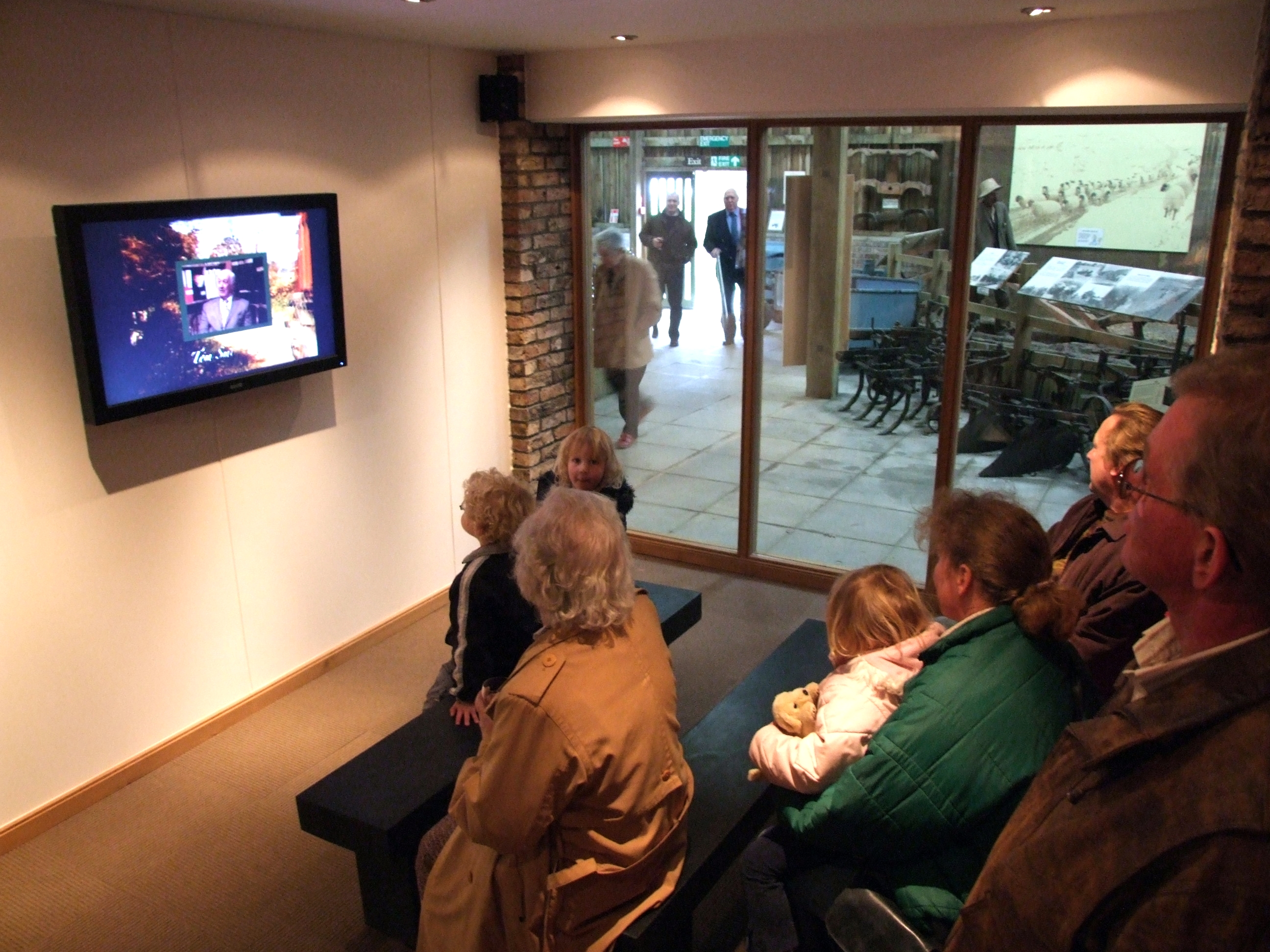
First showing of film to farmers interviewed

During 2007-2008, a project which involved interviewing a number of different farming families was completed. This provides an audiovisual display of different types of farms from around Yorkshire, including dairy, sheep, pigs and arable crops, both organic and those using agrochemicals, an artificial inseminater and some subsistence farms. A new audiovisual room was built as part of the project.

== Derwent Valley Light Railway ==
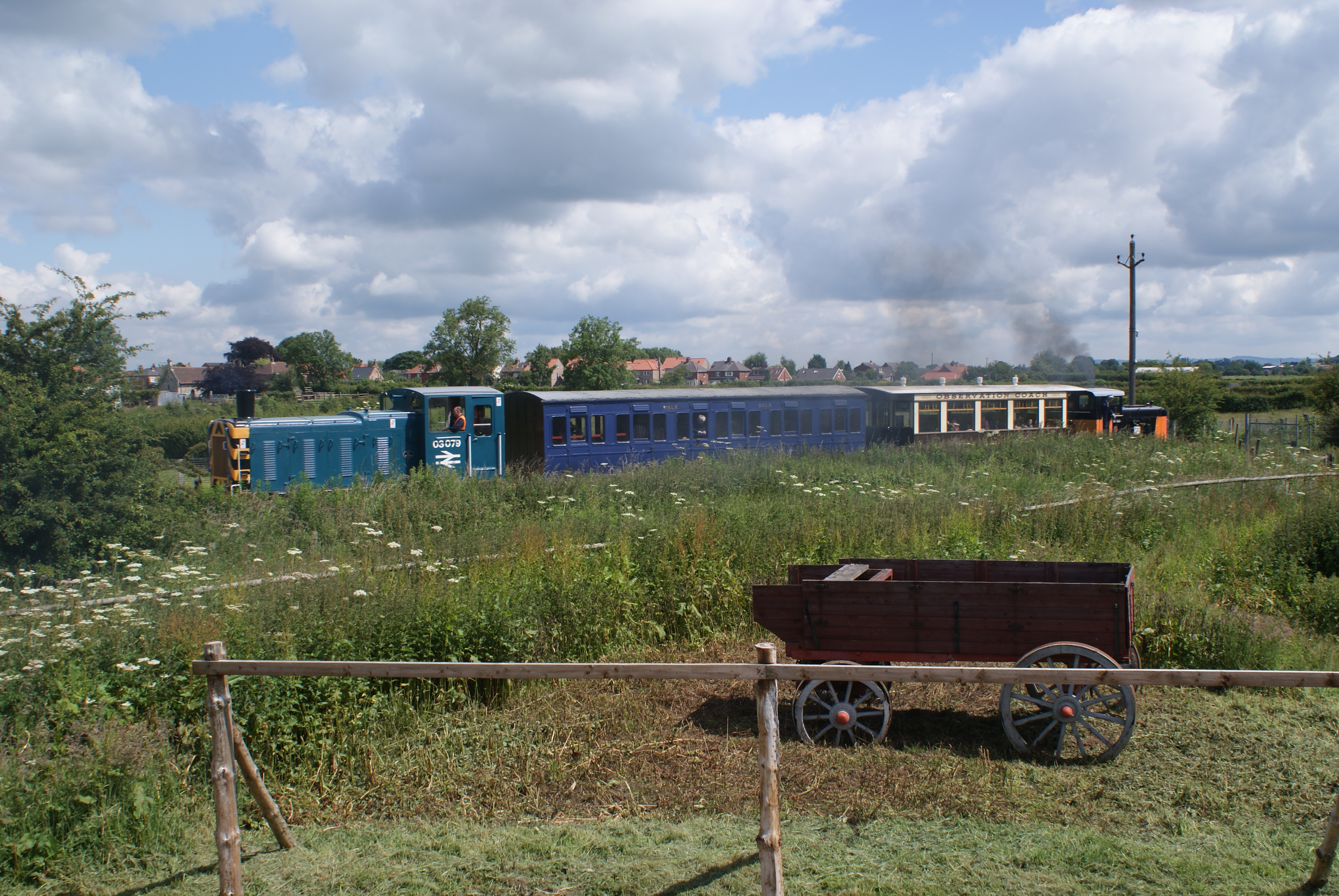
A train on the Derwent Valley Light Railway

Main article: the Derwent Valley Light Railway

The museum lies on the trackbed of the Derwent Valley Light Railway - a privately owned standard-gauge railway which ran from Layerthorpe, on the outskirts of York, to Cliffe Common near Selby. This closed in 1981, but a small section has been restored as part of the museum. It opened in 1993, and incorporates a station building formerly located at Wheldrake. There is approximately 3/4 mile (1.2 km) of track running along the original trackbed towards York.

== Gallery ==
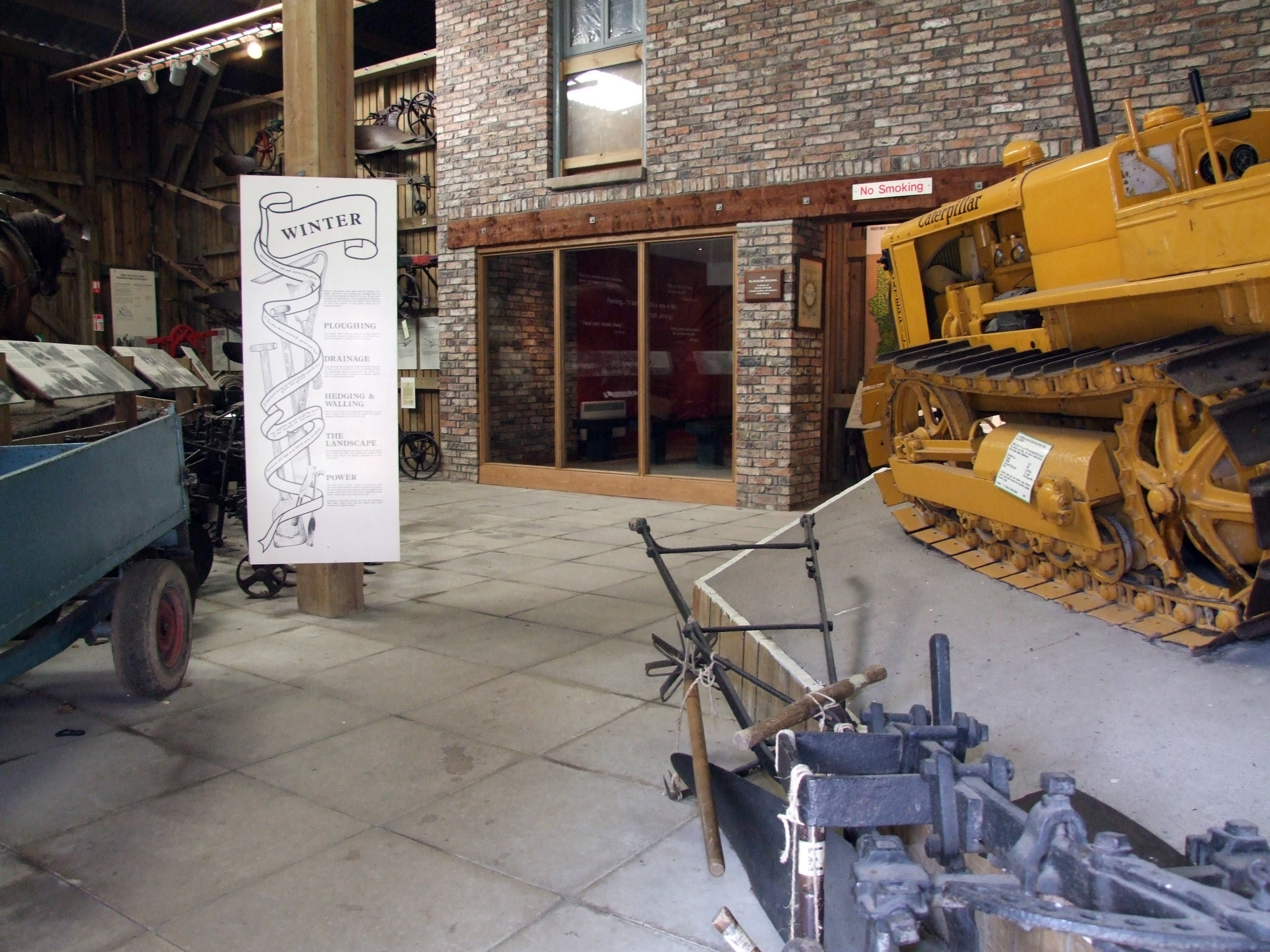
Front display area in main barn

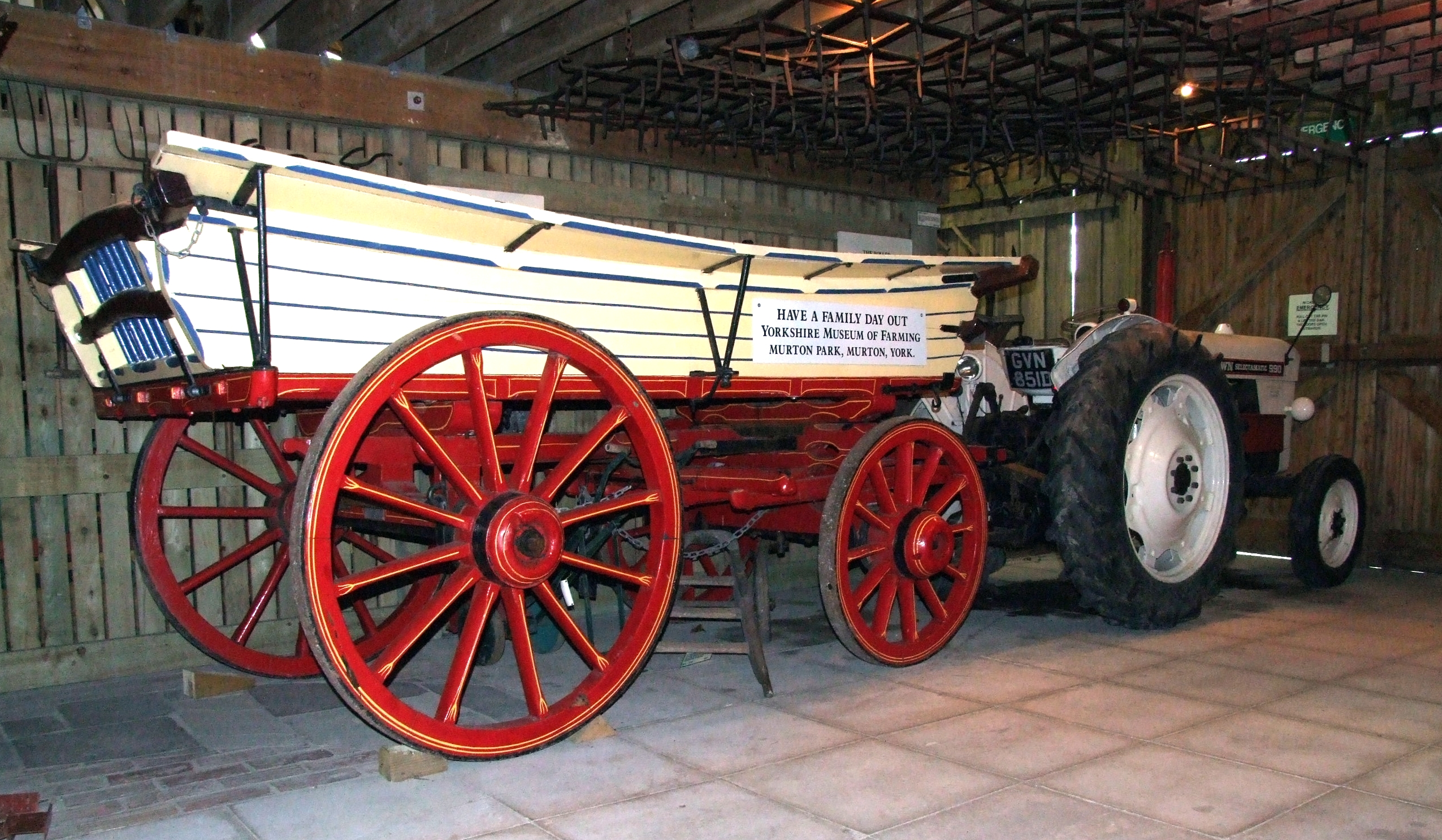
Rear display area in main barn

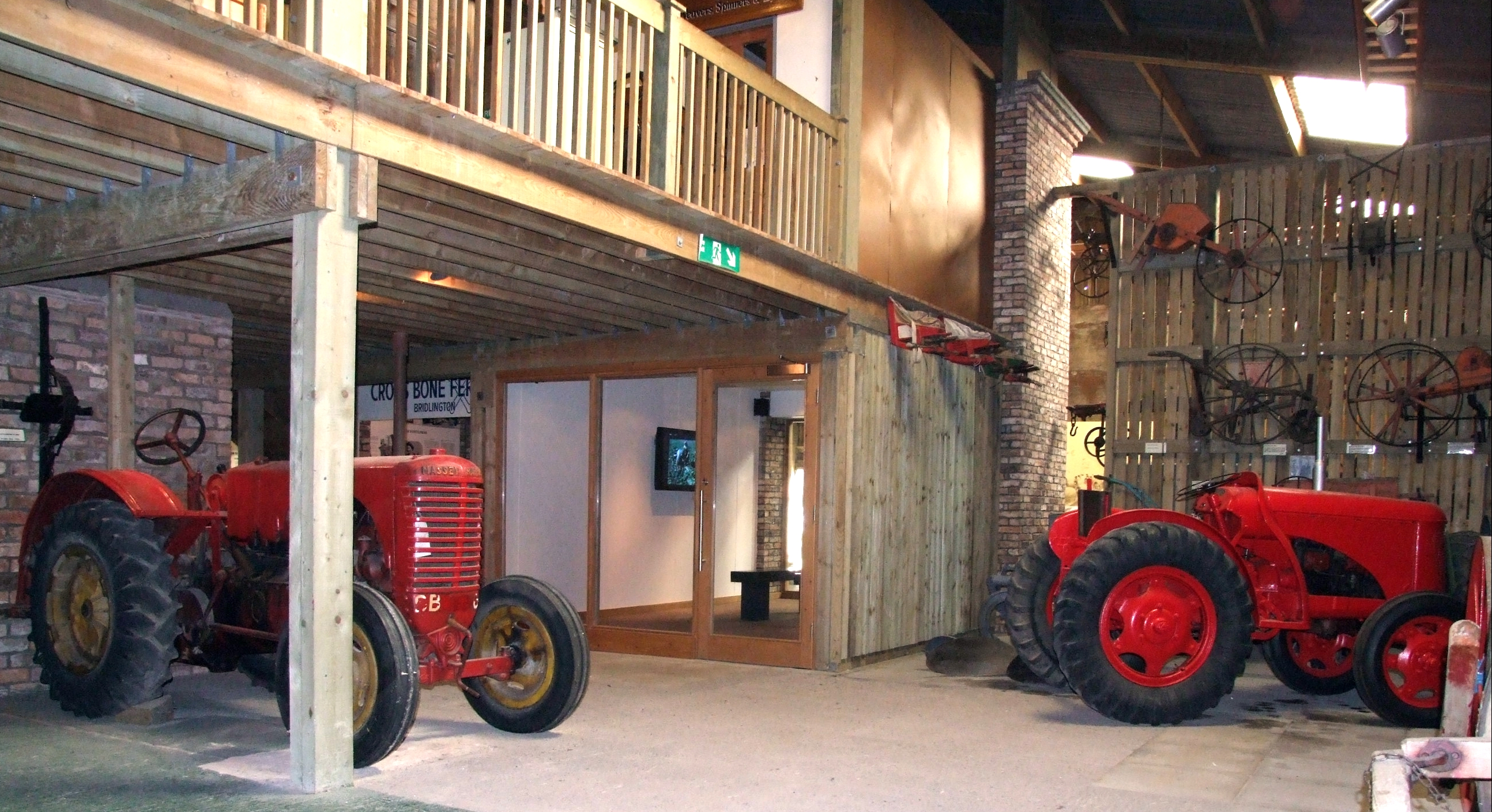
Middle display area in main barn
