= Murton, North Yorkshire =

Village and civil parish in North Yorkshire, England

Coordinates: 53.96627°N 1.01000°W

Murton
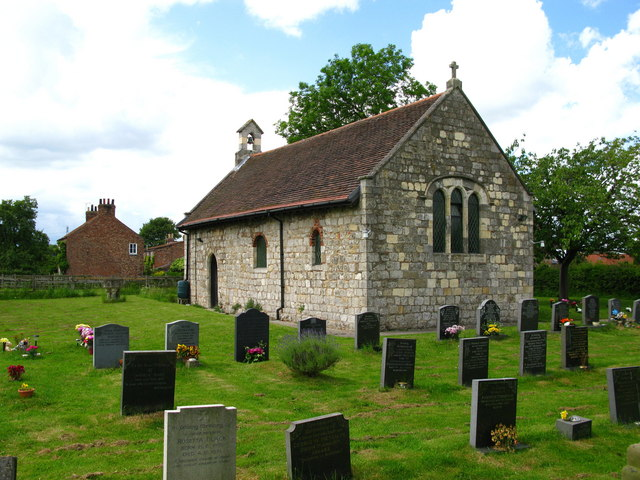
- St James church, Murton

- Location within North Yorkshire
- Population: 668 (2011 census)
- OS grid reference: SE650526
- Civil parish: Murton
- Unitary authority: City of York
- Ceremonial county: North Yorkshire
- Region: Yorkshire and the Humber
- Country: England
- Sovereign state: United Kingdom
- Post town: YORK
- Postcode district: YO19
- Police: North Yorkshire
- Fire: North Yorkshire
- Ambulance: Yorkshire
- UK Parliament: York Outer

Murton is a village and a civil parish in the unitary authority area of the City of York in North Yorkshire, England that is located on the outskirts of York. To the west there is the A64 and the village of Osbaldwick, to the south the A166 road to Bridlington, to the north the village of Stockton-on-the-Forest, and to the east the villages of Holtby and Warthill.

According to the 2001 census the parish had a population of 423, increasing to 668 in the 2011 Census.

The village was historically part of the North Riding of Yorkshire until 1974. It was then a part of the district of Ryedale in North Yorkshire from 1974 until 1996. Since 1996 it has been part of the City of York unitary authority.

The name Murton derives from the Old Norse mór meaning moor, and the Old English tūn meaning 'settlement'.

The village has around a hundred properties ranging from traditional large country houses to more modern buildings.

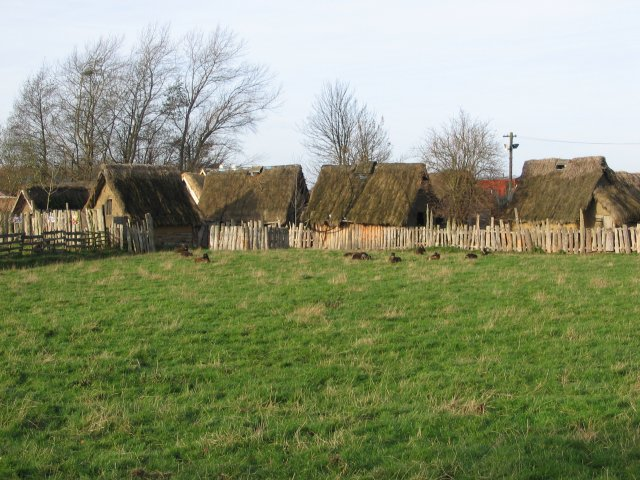
Murton Park Viking Village, by Murton

The village is home to the Yorkshire Museum of Farming at Murton Park. Here there is a small railway track which is the remains of the Derwent Valley Light Railway. Trains are run on Sundays and bank holidays. The village has a local pub called the Bay Horse. The York Livestock Centre is also located in Murton.

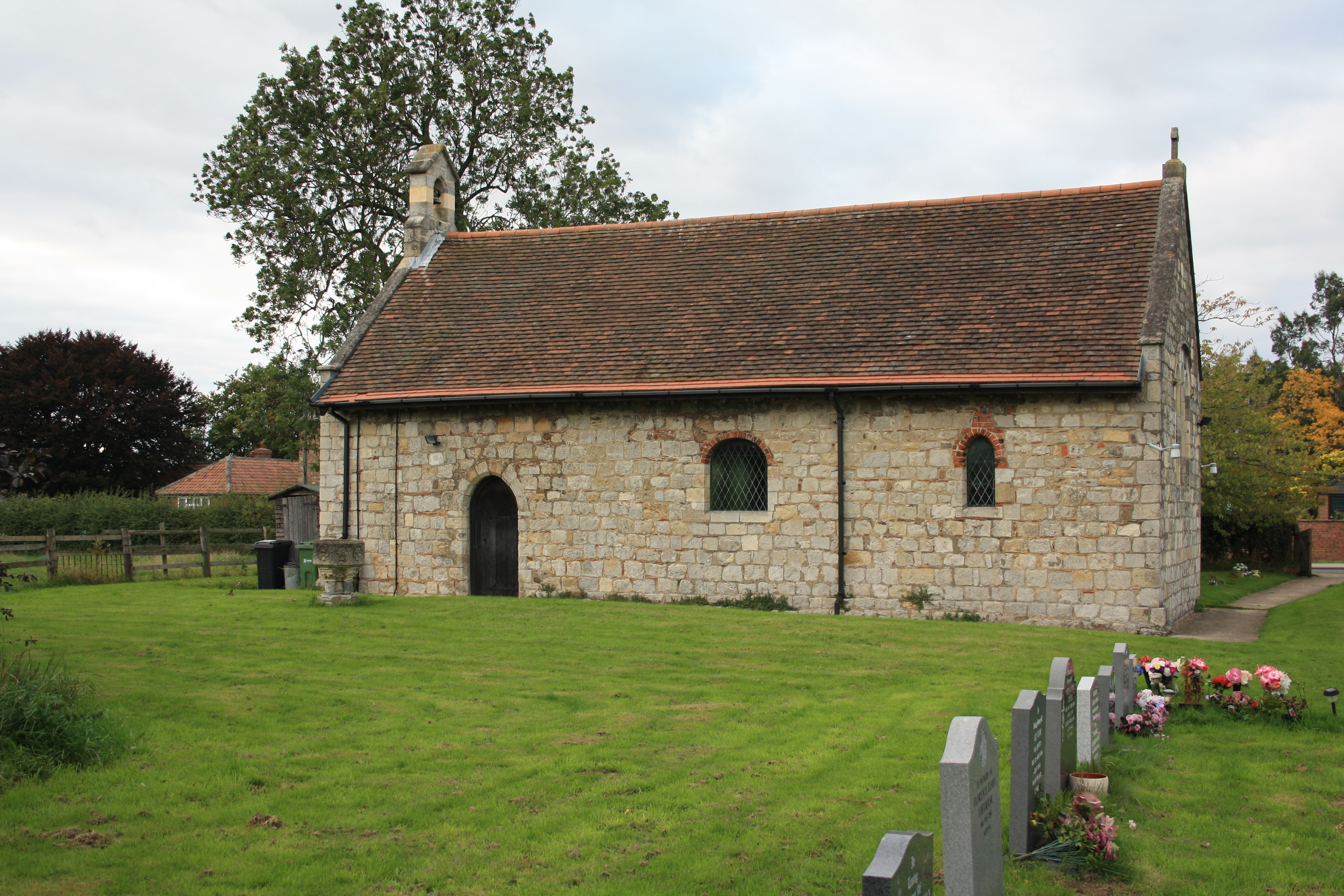
St James Church

St James' Church, Murton is linked with St Thomas' Church, Osbaldwick.

== Transport ==
East Yorkshire Motor Services provide a bus service to the village of Murton from Pocklington to York.
