= York Layerthorpe railway station =

Disused railway station in York, England

York Layerthorpe
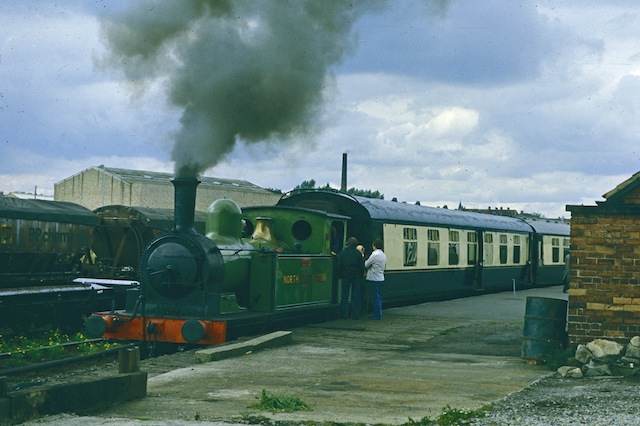
- September 1977

General information
- Location: Layerthorpe, City of York; England
- Coordinates: 53.96119°N 1.06870°W
- Grid reference: SE612520
- Platforms: one

Other information
- Status: Disused

History
- Original company: Derwent Valley Light Railway
- Pre-grouping: Derwent Valley Light Railway
- Post-grouping: Derwent Valley Light Railway

Key dates
- 1913: opened
- 1926: closed for passengers
- 1981: closed for freight except a private siding
- 1987: closed completely
Location

York Layerthorpe railway station was a railway station in Layerthorpe, a suburb of York, North Yorkshire, England.

== History ==
York Layerthorpe opened on 21 July 1913, and served as the northern terminus of the Derwent Valley Light Railway, immediately to the east of that line's connection to the existing Foss Islands Branch Line and thence to the North Eastern Railway's York to Scarborough Line.

Traffic through the station was predominantly agricultural freight and local industries along the route of the DVLR, although passenger services did run on the line from 1913 to 1926. After closure to passengers, agricultural trains and excursions were occasionally operated—often these were for bramble picking on Skipwith Common—hence the line was sometimes known as the "Blackberry Line", or as the "Farmer's Line".

A summer-only steam passenger service was operated from 1977 to 1979. The DVLR closed on 27 September 1981. A single siding at the station serving an oil depot remained in use until 1987. The siding was lifted along with the Foss Island branch when traffic from Rowntrees chocolate factory, at the other end of the branch, switched to road transport in 1988. The section of track between York Layerthorpe and Osbaldwick is now a foot and cycle path.

Preceding station	Historical railways	Following station
Terminus	Derwent Valley Light Railway	Osbaldwick; Line and station closed
