= Stokes Bay =

Body of water on the Solent, Hampshire, England

Coordinates: 50.77859°N 1.16454°W

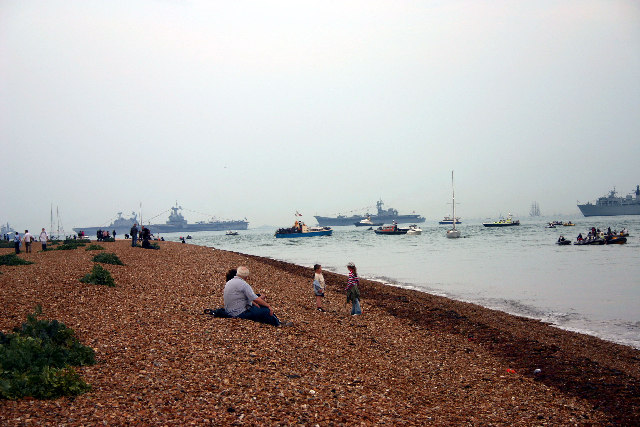
Stokes Bay

Stokes Bay (grid ref.:)SZ 590 980) (50.782982, -1.163868) is an area of the Solent that lies just south of Gosport, between Portsmouth and Lee-on-the-Solent, Hampshire. There is a shingle beach with views of Ryde and East Cowes on the Isle of Wight to the south and Fawley to the south west. The settlement of Alverstoke is close by.

== History ==
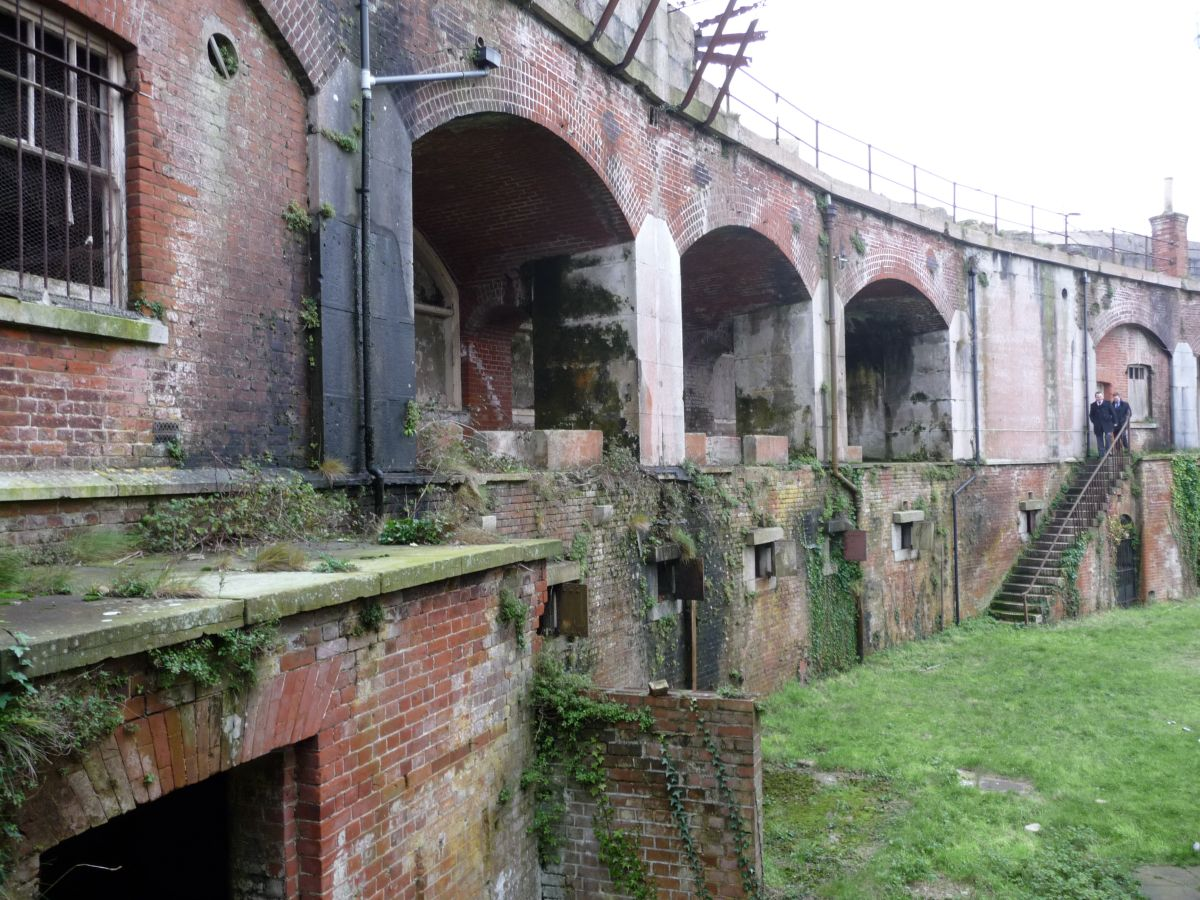
Inside Fort Gilkicker

To the east of Stokes Bay is Fort Gilkicker, which was built in 1871 to guard the headland and the western approaches to Portsmouth Harbour and housed 22 gun emplacements. The bay was used for experiments with submarine mines from 1879-1912. A narrow gauge railway was built from the bay to Fort Blockhouse for these operations, along with a pier.

Fort Gilkicker was used in both world wars to protect Portsmouth and air attacks and fell into disrepair shortly after 1945; it is on the Buildings at Risk Register and support is being sought for its conservation and for an alternative use.

There was also a pier, adjacent to Gosport and Fareham Inshore Rescue Lifeboat station, from which a ferry service ran which was the quickest crossing to the Isle of Wight. The pier had a railway station, opened 6 April 1863, which had a branch line (Stokes Bay Line) from the Fareham to Gosport Line. This railway stopped running services to the pier on 1 November 1915 and sold the land to the Admiralty in 1922. The line was not as popular as the Portsmouth to Ryde crossing although the journey from London was longer than from Portsmouth. Most of the railway line is a cycle path.

The Admiralty used the pier from 1922 to transport munitions and fuel and had a narrow gauge railway line which replaced the branch line. The pier was then used as a torpedo station and fell into disrepair before being demolished in the late 1970s.

During World War II DD Valentine tanks were tested in the bay. In June 1944, landing craft embarked from Stokes Bay for France as part of Operation Overlord, the Allied invasion of Normandy.

The Solent opposite Stokes Bay is often used by extremely large warships (e.g. US supercarriers) to anchor, as Portsmouth Harbour is not deep enough to berth them. It has also been the site of many fleet reviews, the most recent being to celebrate the 200th anniversary of the Battle of Trafalgar in 2005.

== Leisure and Environment ==
To the east is the 9-hole Gosport and Stokes Bay Golf Club. This area of the bay also contains a number of fresh and salt-water margin lagoons and provides a unique habitat for rare flora, including several specimens of the Kermes Oak (A shrub of the Quercus family, native to the Mediterranean).
