= Gosport Road and Alverstoke railway station =

Disused railway station in Gosport, Hampshire

Gosport Road and Alverstoke

General information
- Location: Gosport, Hampshire; England
- Coordinates: 50.7919°N 1.1402°W
- Grid reference: SZ607995
- Platforms: 2

Other information
- Status: Disused

History
- Original company: Stokes Bay Railway and Pier Company
- Pre-grouping: London and South Western Railway

Key dates
- 1 June 1865: Opened as Stoke Road
- 8 November 1866: Name changed to Gosport Road
- October 1893: Name changed to Gosport Road and Alverstoke
- 1 November 1915: Closed
Location

Gosport Road and Alverstoke railway station served the town of Gosport, Hampshire, England, from 1865 to 1915 on the Stokes Bay line.

== History ==
The station was opened as Stoke Road on 1 June 1865 by the Stokes Bay Railway and Pier Company. It was situated on the south side of Pier Road. The platforms were initially low, both of them having a waiting shelter. On the up platform was the ticket office. The station and platforms were rebuilt in 1885, both of them now being a standard height. The station's name was changed to Gosport Road on 8 November 1866 and changed again to Gosport Road and Alverstoke in October 1893. It closed on 1 November 1915. The station buildings were converted to housing for the station guard. The station was demolished in the 1930s and the site is now partly occupied by housing and a road.

Preceding station	Disused railways	Following station
Gosport; Line and station closed	Stokes Bay Railway and Pier Company; Stokes Bay line	Stokes Bay; Line and station closed
