= Gosport railway station =

Former railway station in England

Gosport
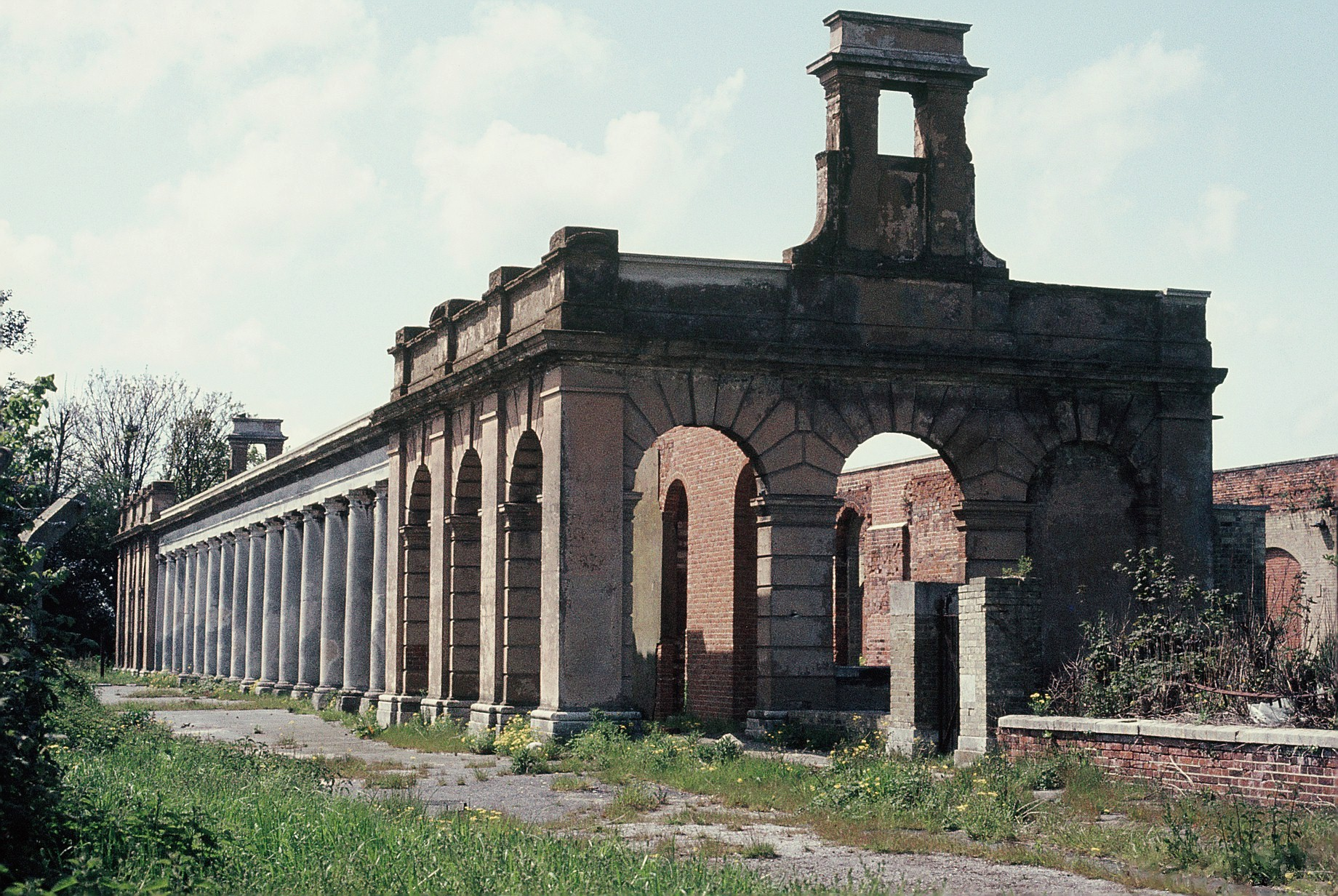
- Gosport Railway Station, derelict with overgrown weeds and grass prior to conversion to housing.

General information
- Location: Gosport, Gosport; England
- Coordinates: 50.7979°N 1.1302°W
- Platforms: 2 (1 passenger + 1 goods)

Other information
- Status: Disused

History
- Original company: London and South Western Railway
- Pre-grouping: London and South Western Railway
- Post-grouping: Southern Railway

Key dates
- 29 November 1841: Opened
- 8 June 1953: Closed (passenger)
- 30 January 1969: Closed (goods)
Location

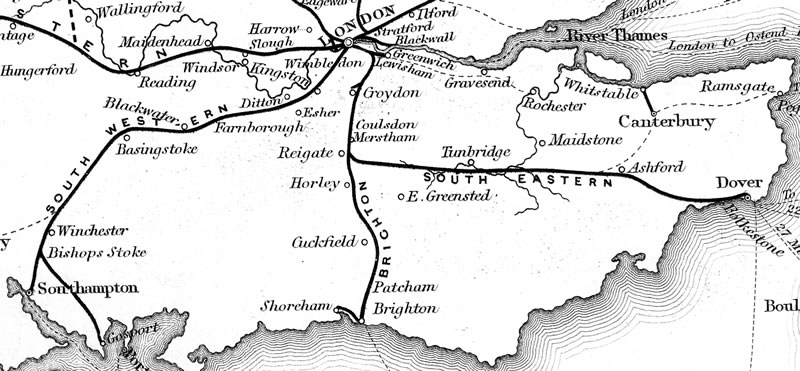
Railways in the South East of England in 1840

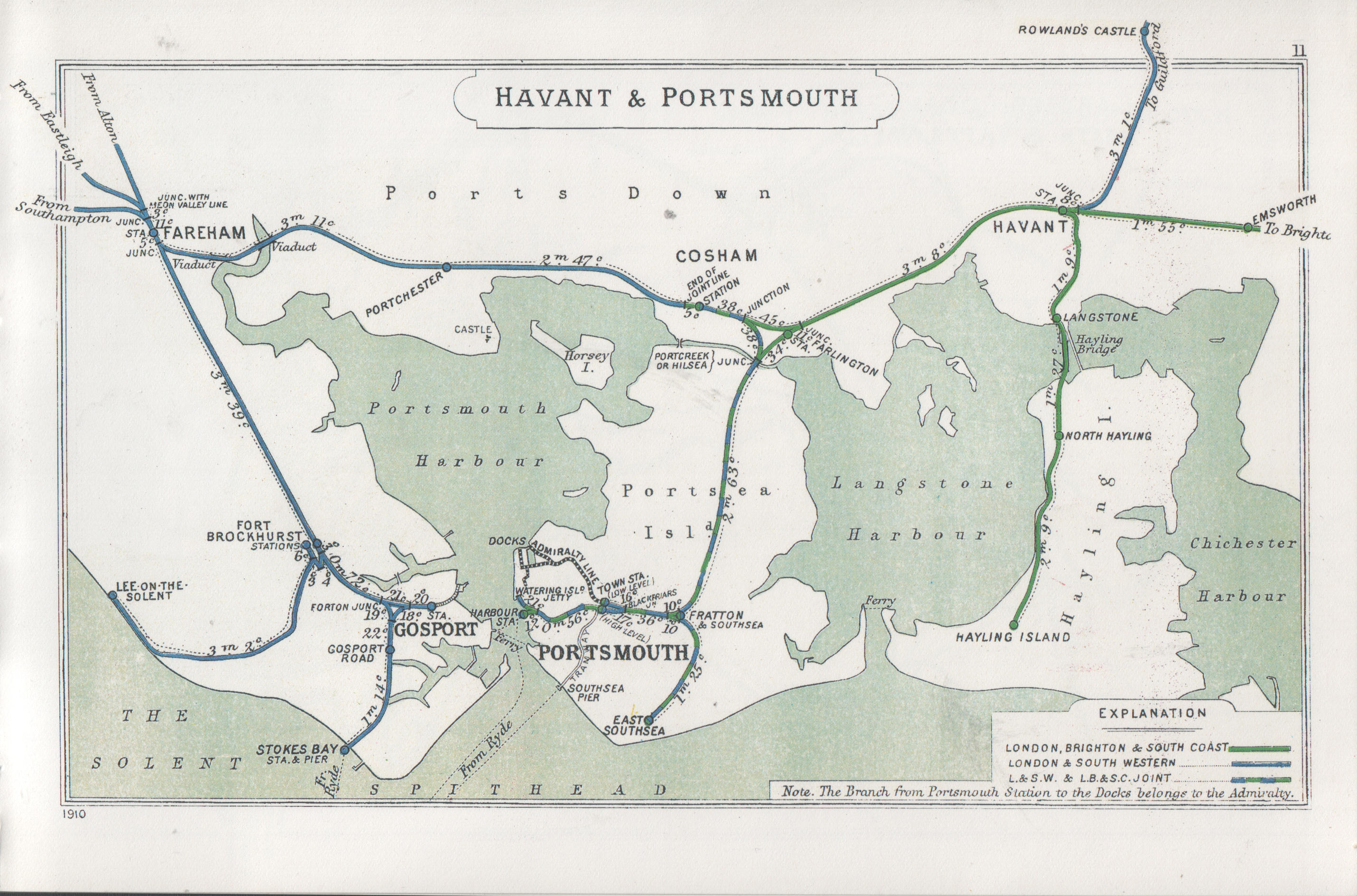
A 1910 Railway Clearing House map of lines around Gosport railway station

Gosport railway station was a terminus station designed by William Tite and opened to passenger and freight trains in 1841 by the London and South Western Railway (LSWR). It was closed in 1953 to passenger trains, and in 1969 to the remaining freight services. It was a Grade II* listed building.

== History ==
The terminus was built after considerable negotiation with the Board of Ordnance, which argued that the site, just outside a main gate in the Gosport Lines ramparts, could compromise the Portsmouth Harbour defences. The buildings were consequently designed to be defensible, with surrounding railings and a roof parapet.

From the start, the station was very busy, particularly with the carriage of coal and other freight, and initially was also used for passengers travelling to Portsmouth, a short ferry ride across the harbour. The LSWR also opened a locomotive depot next to the station in February 1842 which was badly damaged during a bombing raid in 1941 but remained in use until its demolition in 1953.

At its opening, Gosport was one of the three principal termini of the London and South Western Railway, the others being London (Nine Elms) and Southampton. There was no railway to Portsmouth and travellers from there crossed to Gosport. Hence the station was substantial, including a 14-arch colonnade on the south side, and was built in an Italianate style like the other two termini. Its importance declined somewhat after Portsmouth got its own rail routes in 1847 (circuitous) and 1859 (direct).

The station saw the first of many royal visitors in 1843, when Prince Albert, husband of Queen Victoria, greeted Louis Philippe of France at Gosport. Queen Victoria visited the station six days later when she accompanied the king on his return to France. Following Albert's purchase of Osborne House on the Isle of Wight the following year, he negotiated the construction of an extension of the line through the town ramparts to a private station, the Royal Victoria Station, built in Royal Clarence Yard for the use of Royal family and household, who would arrive here for the Solent crossing. For the next fifty years, Victoria and her party landed here for her summer holiday at Osborne. The private station was last used for passengers following Victoria's death in 1901, when her coffin, accompanied by her mourning family, was brought across the Solent for the last time. Following Victoria's death, her successor, Edward VII, found Osborne an inconvenient white elephant, and gave the house to the nation.

The station was given great impetus during World War I as Gosport's role as Victualler to the Navy increased. There was in influx of supplies to and from Royal Clarence Yard, and also large numbers of troop movements and the transportation of the wounded en route to Haslar Hospital.

After the First World War rail traffic decreased, but with the coming of the World War II the station saw much military activity again, including supplies, hospital trains and trains carrying prisoners of war on their way to a local internment camp. On the night of 10 March 1941 the station received a direct incendiary hit from an aerial attack, the main damage being to the roofing which caught alight and collapsed.

After the war Gosport station's role again diminished, and on 6 June 1953 scheduled passenger services from Gosport ceased. Freight traffic remained until 30 January 1969, but then the station closed to all traffic.

== Current status ==
In 2006, planning approval was given for the site to convert the platforms and buildings into a small number of residential properties and offices with the main gate in Spring Garden Lane opened up for vehicle access. This development is for the Guinness Trust. The development was completed in 2010. In particular, the southern colonnade was retained and repaired. The development received a town award from the Gosport Society, commemorated by a plaque on the building.

== Route ==
Preceding station	Disused railways	Following station
Fort Brockhurst	London and South Western Railway; Fareham to Gosport Line	Terminus
Gosport Road and Alverstoke	London and South Western Railway; Stokes Bay Line	Terminus
