= Clarence Barracks =

Military building in Portsmouth, England

- Portsmouth
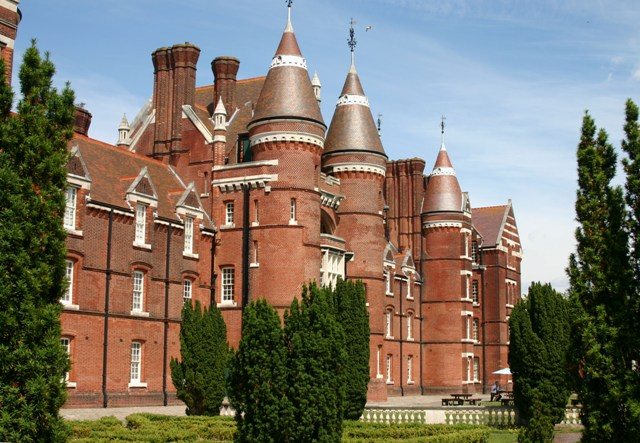
- Clarence Barracks

Site information
- Type: Barracks

Location
- Location within Hampshire
- Coordinates: 50.79153°N 1.09770°W

Site history
- Built: 1760
- Built for: War Office
- In use: 1760-1972

Clarence Barracks was a military installation at Portsmouth, Hampshire.

== History ==
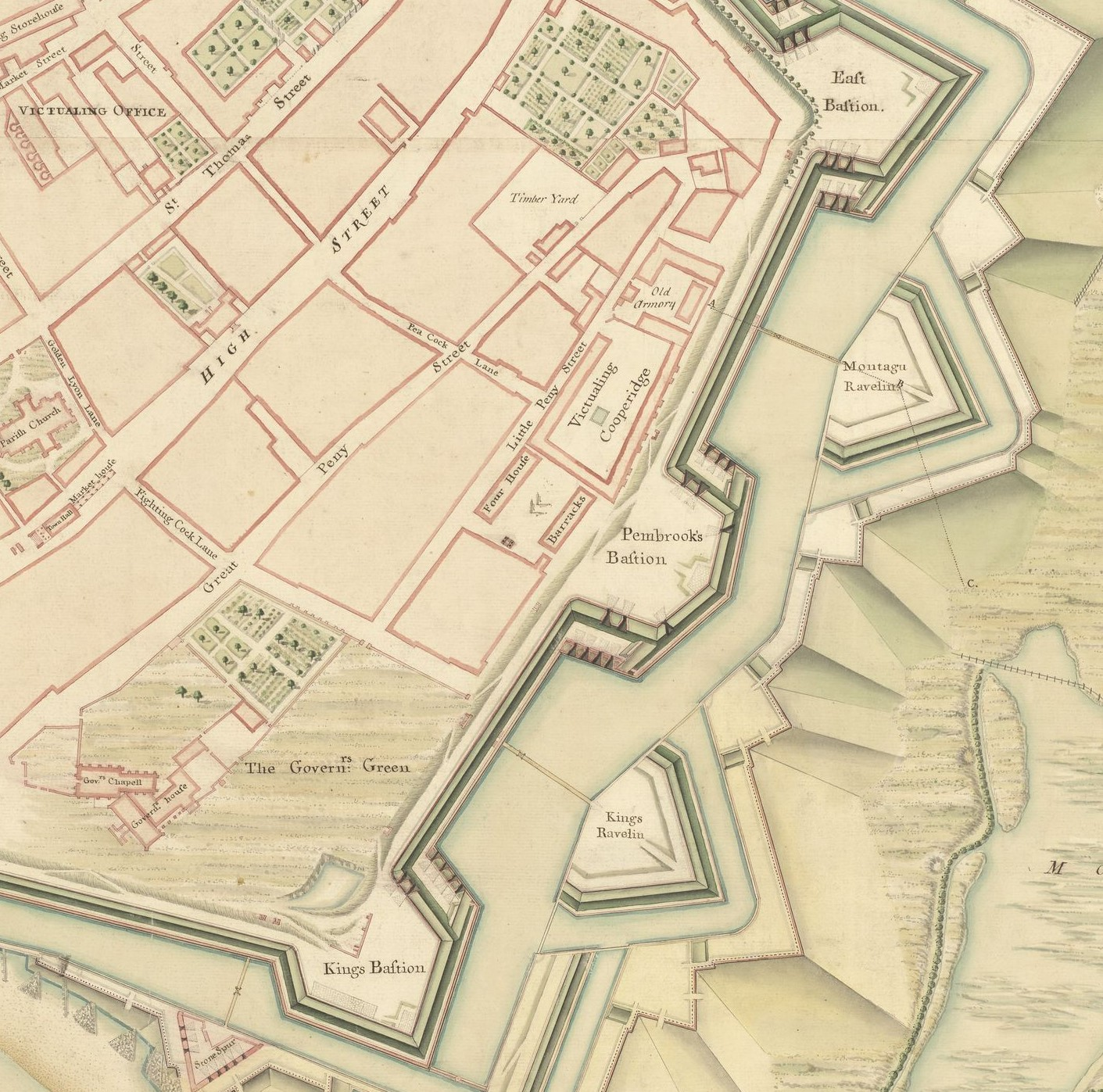
Detail of a map dated 1750, showing (centre) the 'Victualing Cooperage' (which later became the RM Barracks), below it 'Four House Barracks' and above the 'Old Armory' (or Shot Locker). Above and to the left is the 'Timber Yard' that would later be converted into Cambridge Barracks. Drawn by J. P. Desmaretz.

The original site for what became Clarence Barracks was the early 17th-century King's Cooperage in Old Portsmouth, owned and operated by the Victualling Commissioners. Rebuilt in 1723, it consisted of a long narrow courtyard surrounded by workshops, seasoning sheds, offices and storehouses; a new well was dug and a rainwater cistern erected to provide reliable sources of water. It stood on the town's south-eastern edge, with St Nicholas Street on one side and the line of fortifications on the other.

=== Royal Marine Barracks, Portsmouth ===
In 1753 the Cooperage relocated to the Weevil on the Gosport side of the harbour; whereupon the Navy Board began making plans to convert the old buildings into a barracks for the newly constituted Portsmouth Division of the Royal Marines. Accommodation was provided for about a quarter of the Division (which numbered 2,200 men plus officers, two-thirds of whom were expected to be at sea at any one time): eight rooms were set aside for the officers, and forty-five rooms for the men (who slept two to a bed, twelve in each room); each room was also furnished with two dining tables, twelve stools and kit-lockers. In 1823-4 the barracks were extended into an adjacent parcel of land previously known as the Shot Locker. The barracks were renamed Clarence Barracks after the Duke of Clarence who visited the site to present colours to the Royal Marines Light Infantry in 1827.

By the 1840s the Marines were outgrowing this accommodation, and an arrangement was made whereby the Admiralty exchanged Clarence Barracks for the Army's Forton Barracks, near Gosport. In 1848 the Portsmouth Division of the Royal Marines Light Infantry moved into their new accommodation in Forton, and the Army took possession of Clarence Barracks. Ten years later, however, Clarence was condemned by the Army Sanitary Commission as 'quite unfit for habitation', which cited (among other shortcomings) the close proximity of the privies to the cook-house.

=== Fourhouse Barracks ===
Immediately to the south of the King's Cooperage stood the Tudor King's Beerhouses (or Brewery) on what was known as Four House Green. In the 17th century they had been sold into private hands and were subsequently closed. For a time quarters for Invalid soldiers stood on the site, until barrack accommodation for around a thousand infantry was built there in 1760; this was known as Fourhouse Barracks. Later, when both Forehouse and Clarence were in Army hands, the two together were sometimes known as Clarence Barracks (in the 1860s several properties in St Nicholas Street had been purchased by the War Office 'so as to unite the Clarence, Cambridge and Fourhouse Barracks').

=== New Clarence Barracks ===
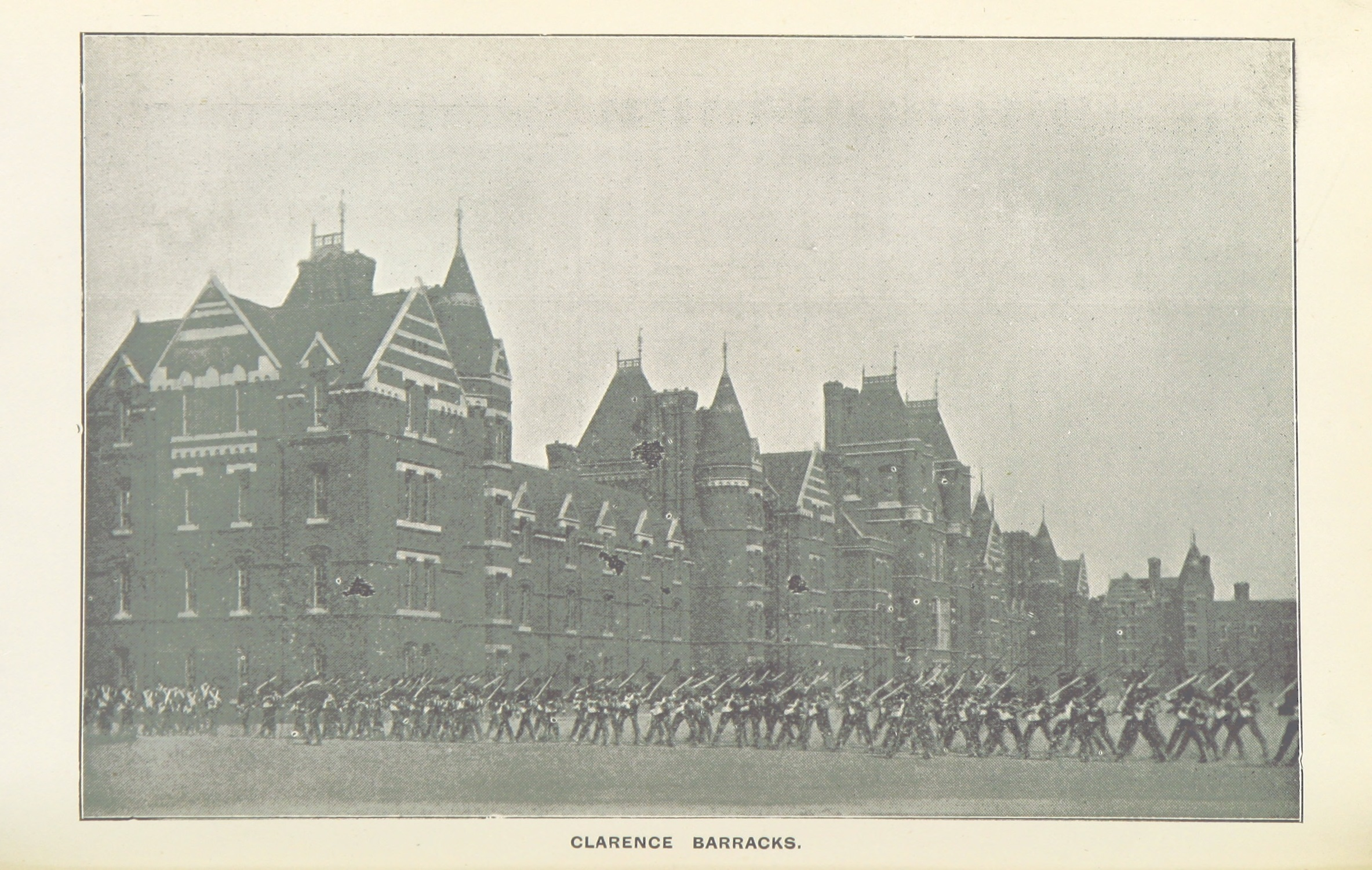
Parade ground at the new Clarence Barracks, 1899.

In the 1880s the old ramparts were levelled and the opportunity was taken in 1890 to demolish the old Clarence/Fourhouse barracks and build a 'spectacular' new complex of buildings (on a much larger scale, since they were no longer hemmed in behind fortifications). The new Clarence Barracks housed six garrison battalions of the Royal Artillery, while nearby Victoria Barracks (begun ten years earlier) contained a regiment of Infantry. A large parade ground was created and new officers' quarters were added in 1893. Later, when the north (officers') range of the adjacent Cambridge Barracks was purchased by Portsmouth Grammar School, the south (soldiers') range was incorporated into Clarence Barracks (it was later itself purchased by the school).

The barracks suffered a significant amount of bomb damage in the Second World War. In March 1948 they were converted for use by the Women's Royal Naval Service and renamed the Duchess of Kent Barracks (after the Princess Marina of Greece and Denmark, who was Duchess of Kent and Commandant of the Service). The barracks began to be decommissioned in the early 1960s. From 1966 senior and junior WRNS ratings were temporarily accommodated in the Wardroom of the Naval Barracks (HMS Victory, later renamed HMS Nelson) to allow the Duchess of Kent Barracks to be vacated, while new permanent quarters were constructed for them within Victory alongside their male counterparts. In 1967 most of the former Clarence Barracks buildings were demolished, the site having been acquired for housing by the City Council.

The officers' quarters survived; the last of the WRNS having left in 1970, the building was acquired for use by the Portsmouth City Museum in 1972.
