= Victoria Barracks, Portsmouth =

English military installation

Victoria Barracks
- Portsmouth
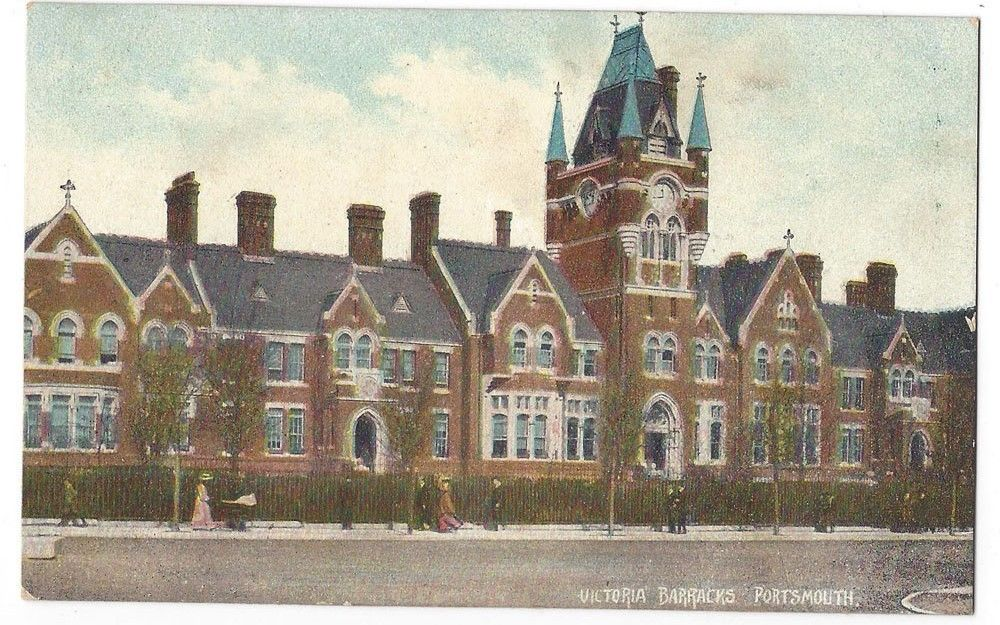
- Victoria Barracks

Site information
- Type: Barracks

Location
- Location within Hampshire
- Coordinates: 50.79050°N 1.09679°W

Site history
- Built: 1886
- Built for: War Office
- In use: 1886-1967

Victoria Barracks was a military installation at Portsmouth, Hampshire, England. It was sometimes known as Victoria Barracks, Southsea.

== History ==
The barracks, begun in 1880 and built by convict labour, were designed to provide living accommodation for a regiment of infantry. Located on the Southsea side of Old Portsmouth, outside the old town fortifications (which were in the process of being demolished at the time), they were completed in 1886. They consisted of a pair of long barrack ranges, linked by arcades at either end to form a narrow quadrangle, with a separate Officers' Quarters and Mess Establishment to the south-west: 'a highly Picturesque, free-style composition, very un-English, which included a central clock tower, stairs in detached, conical turrets, and a billiard room in a sort of Great Hall at the back'.

The first unit to arrive was the 1st Battalion, the South Lancashire Regiment (who were transferred there gradually, as the buildings were completed, from the old Clarence Barracks which lay within the lines). The plans for the officers' quarters (dated 1885) suggest that it was intended to transfer the name Clarence Barracks to the new buildings, but in the event the name Victoria Barracks was used. (Clarence became the designation of a new Artillery barracks, begun in 1890; these were built alongside Victoria Barracks to the west, in place of the old barracks and over the now-demolished fortifications). Between the new Clarence and Victoria Barracks a large parade ground was laid out.

The central tower of the Officers' Quarters was hit by a bomb and seriously damaged during the Second World War. The nearby Guard House was also bomb damaged, and subsequently rebuilt. After the war the barracks were taken over by the Royal Navy and used for seven years as a training establishment for new recruits. The buildings were eventually demolished in 1967. The site was subsequently developed for residential use and is now known as Pembroke Park.

== Sources ==
- Smythies, Captain Raymond R. H. (1894). Historical Records of the 40th (2nd Somersetshire) Regiment. Devonport: A. H. Swiss.
