= Stokes Bay railway station =

Disused railway station in Gosport, Hampshire

Stokes Bay

General information
- Location: Gosport, Hampshire; England
- Coordinates: 50.7767°N 1.1504°W
- Grid reference: SZ600978
- Platforms: 2

Other information
- Status: Disused

History
- Original company: Stokes Bay Railway and Pier Company
- Pre-grouping: London and South Western Railway

Key dates
- 6 April 1863: Opened
- 1 November 1915: Closed
Location

Stokes Bay railway station served the town of Gosport, Hampshire, England, from 1863 to 1915 on the Stokes Bay line.

== History ==
The station was opened on 6 April 1863 by the Stokes Bay Railway and Pier Company. It was situated on a pier at the end of Military Road. It was intended to carry passengers from Gosport so they could use the ferry which went to the Isle of Wight. It had waiting rooms and booking offices at the end of each platform. The pier closed after an examination in 1896 but a temporary platform was built on land so passengers could still use it. The station closed on 1 November 1915. The station and pier was demolished after closure. Part of the trackbed of the railway towards Gosport Road is now a footpath.

Preceding station	Disused railways	Following station
Gosport Road and Alverstoke; Line and station closed	Stokes Bay Railway and Pier Company; Stokes Bay line	Terminus
