= Cambridge Barracks, Portsmouth =

Military barracks

Cambridge Barracks
- Portsmouth
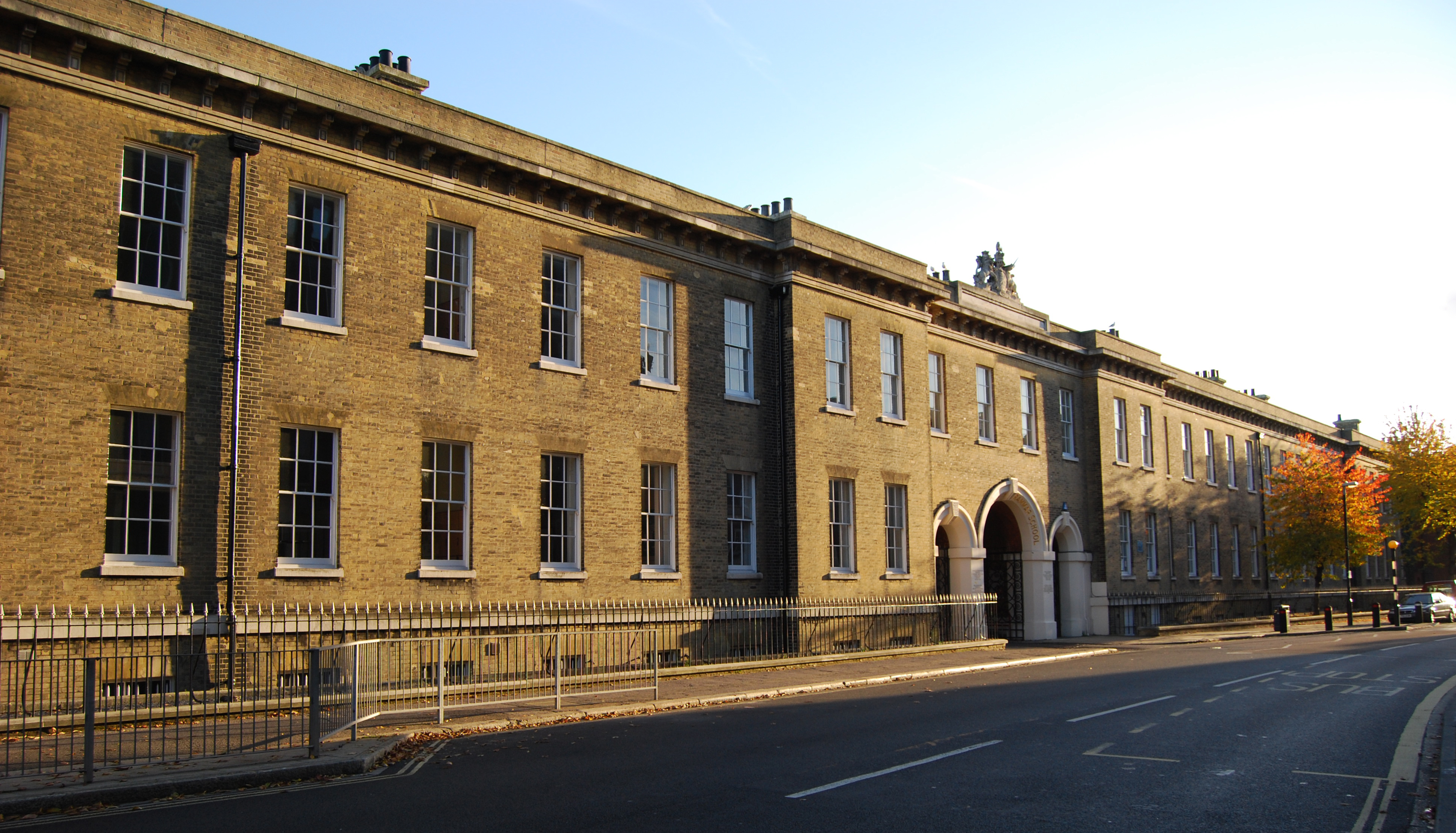
- Cambridge Barracks (former officers' quarters)

Site information
- Type: Barracks

Location
- Location within Hampshire
- Coordinates: 50.79204°N 1.09975°W

Site history
- Built: 1856–1859
- Built for: War Office
- In use: 1859-1991

Cambridge Barracks was a military installation at Portsmouth, Hampshire. It was created in 1825, and was in use until after the First World War.

== History ==
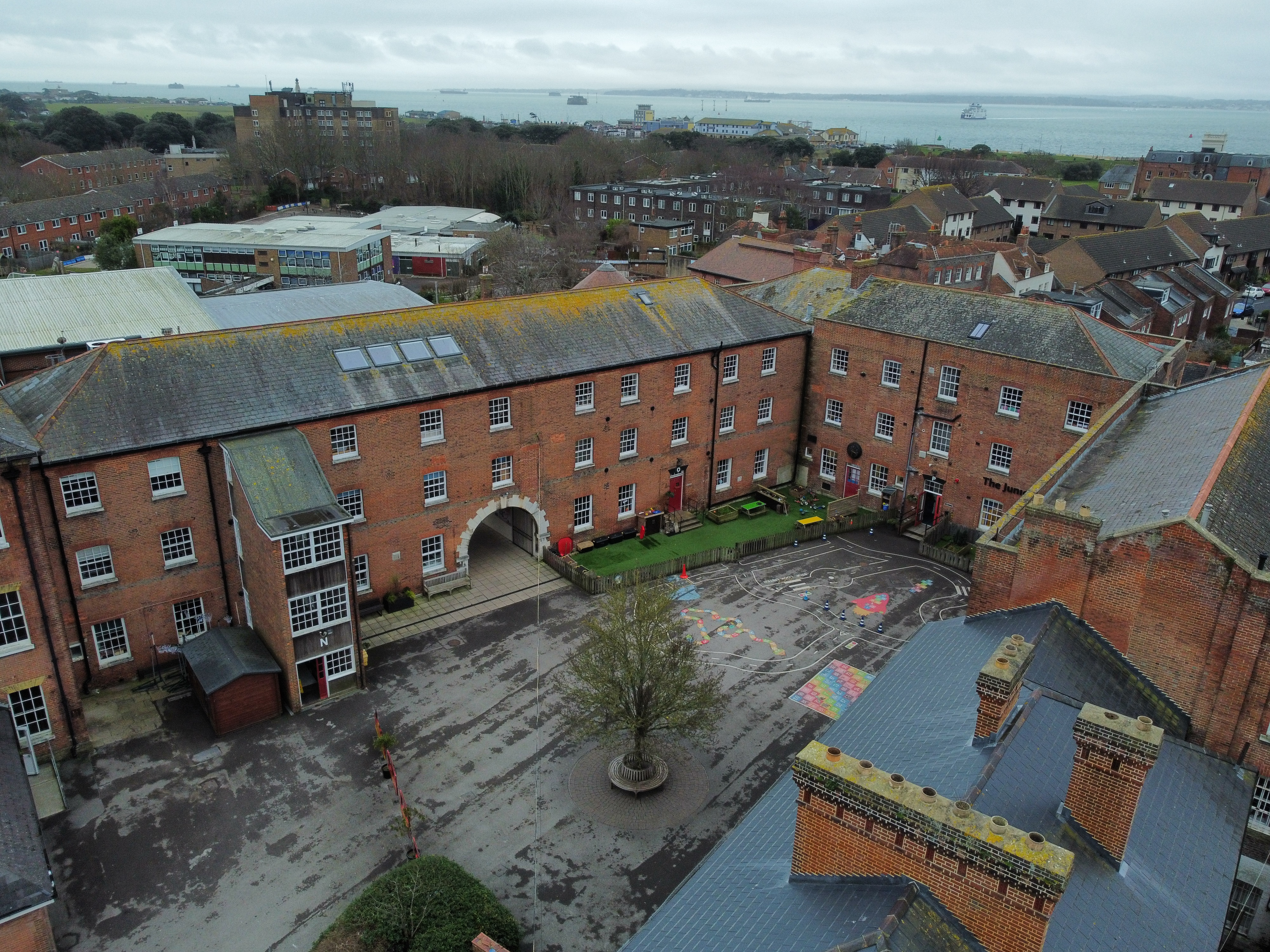
18th-century former warehouse blocks, which were converted into barracks in 1825.

The barracks were created by converting some late-18th century warehouses into military accommodation in 1825. The site had previously been a large timber-yard and carpenters' workshops; it was purchased by the government during the Napoleonic Wars and converted into an 'immense' stores complex for the Commissariat (responsible for supplying food, fuel and forage to the troops).

These former warehouses are still in place, forming an asymmetrical open courtyard at the south-west end of what is now Portsmouth Grammar School: they stand three storeys high and originally contained open-plan store rooms accessed through external hoist doors on each storey. In October 1825 each floor was converted to form barrack rooms; the 9th Regiment (Fusiliers) was the first to occupy the new barracks. At that time a guard-house formed the fourth side of the quadrangle.

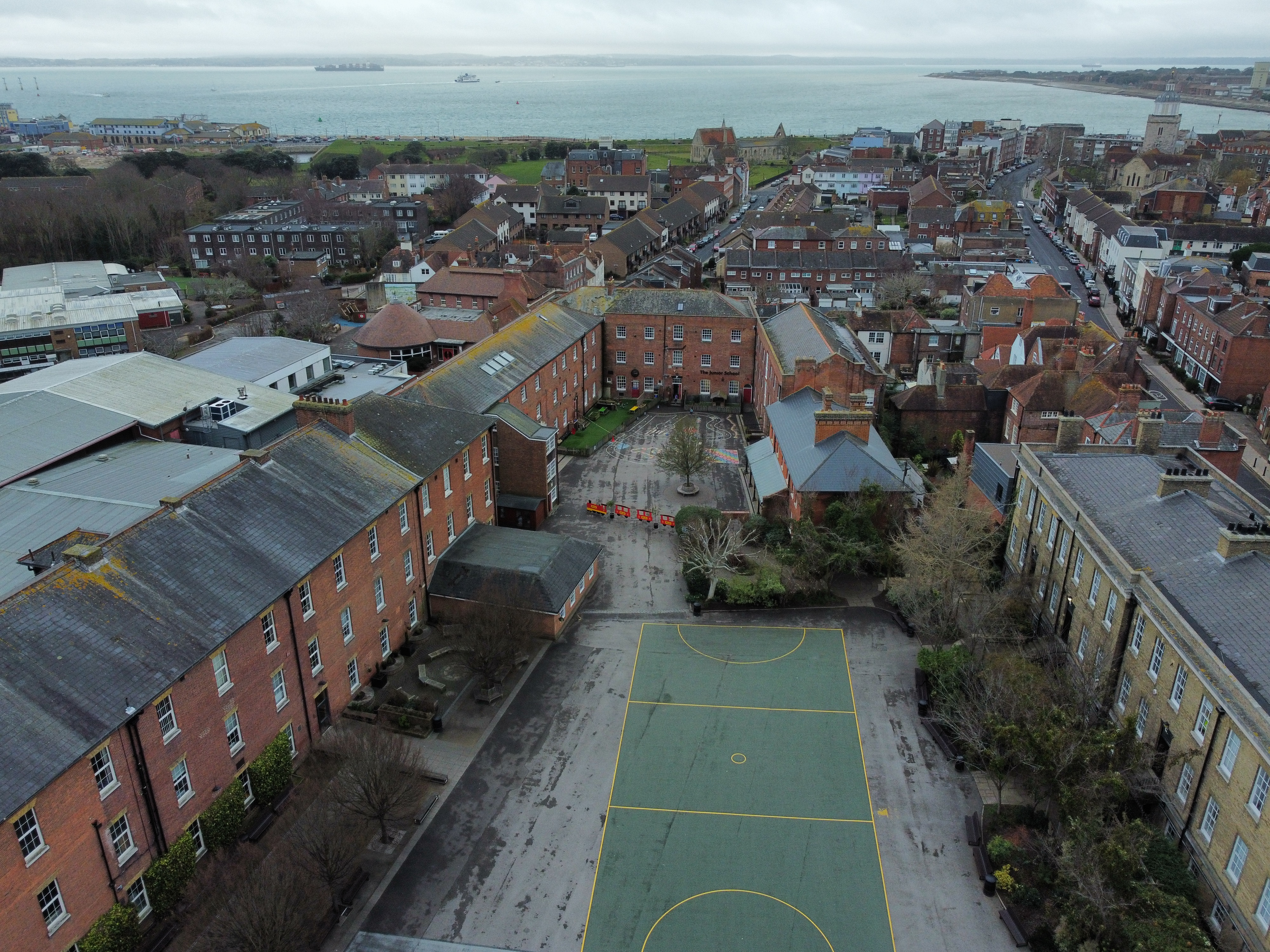
Aerial view of the former parade ground: at the top are the 18th-century warehouses which were converted into barracks in 1825; below are the soldiers' barracks (left) and officers' quarters (right) added in 1856-58.

In 1856–1858 the barracks were extended and enhanced to create accommodation for regiments in transit for operations overseas. An officers' quarters was built, fronting on to the High Street, with a large officers' mess on the first floor. At some distance behind it (so as to form a sizeable parade ground) a long, three-storey soldiers' barracks was erected, containing a series of back-to-back barrack rooms either side of a central office section, with a cook-house at the south-west end linking it to the older barrack blocks. It was at around this time that the barracks were named after Prince Adolphus, Duke of Cambridge who had recently died. Subsequently a two-storey block was built, between the old barracks quadrangle and the new officers' quarters, containing offices for the Commanding Officer and others.

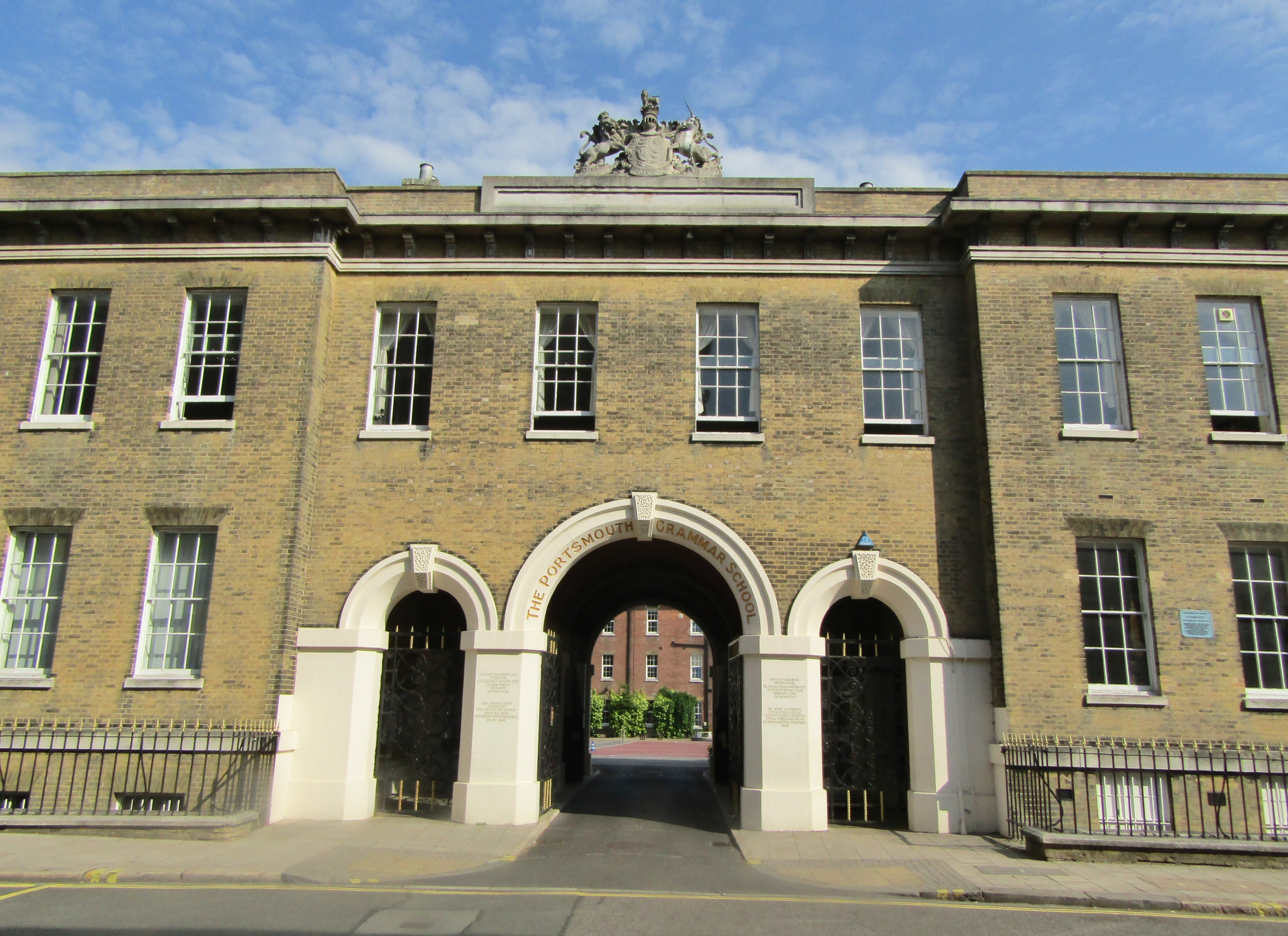
Soldiers' barracks of 1858 glimpsed through the arch beneath the officers' mess.

In January 1887, there was a serious gas explosion at the site in which five members of the Worcestershire Regiment died and fourteen were injured. The 1st Battalion, the Northumberland Fusiliers was in transit at the barracks when the First World War broke out in August 1914.

The barracks became disused and fell derelict after the First World War. The officers' quarters were acquired by Portsmouth Grammar School in 1926. The soldiers' barracks blocks were initially amalgamated into the adjacent Clarence Barracks; later, they too were acquired by the school, which now covers the entire former barracks site. The school library occupies the former officers' mess.
