= Royal Clarence Yard =

Victualling yard for the Royal Navy

Coordinates: 50.7955°N 1.1181°W

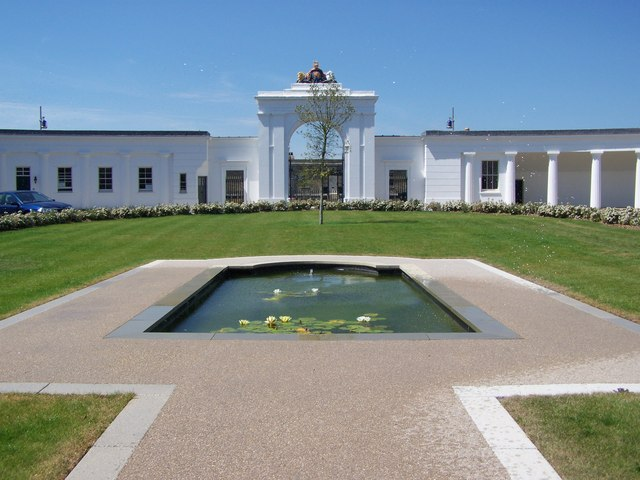
The main gate of Royal Clarence Yard

Royal Clarence Yard in Gosport, Hampshire, England was established in 1828 as one of the Royal Navy's two principal, purpose-built, provincial victualling establishments (the other being Royal William Yard in Plymouth, Devon), both of which worked in tandem with the central victualling establishment in Deptford. It was designed by George Ledwell Taylor, Civil Architect to the Navy Board and named after the then Duke of Clarence (later William IV, King of England). A naval brewing establishment had previously operated on the site (at Weevil, to the north of Gosport on the west shore of Portsmouth Harbour), which the Victualling Commissioners purchased in the mid-18th century.

Queen Victoria regularly used the Royal Clarence Yard as her disembarkation point for the short journey across the Solent to her house at Osborne in the Isle of Wight, travelling from Gosport Station on the single track line extension which had been opened in 1844 principally for this purpose.

By the 20th century, the yard had expanded to cover 50 acres (20 ha) of land. Between the establishment of the Yard and its eventual decommissioning in the early 1990s, Royal Clarence Yard supplied provisions to the Royal Navy in all the major conflicts of this period.

In 1995, the Ministry of Defence (MoD) declared just over 40 acres (16 ha) of the Royal Clarence Yard to be surplus to requirements, and released it to Gosport Borough Council. Berkeley Homes bid for the land in 1998 and was granted planning permission for a mixed use development in 2001. The south-eastern part of the Yard (of just over 9 acres (3.6 ha)), which includes the Oil and Pipelines Agency access to the Gosport Oil Fuel Depot, was retained by the MoD for operational reasons. In 2014, the Defence Infrastructure Organisation announced plans to release most of the rest of the retained land at Royal Clarence Yard to Gosport Borough Council.

== History of the victualling yard ==
Records dating from the early 17th century show the area being named "Weevel Wel Spring". Later records indicate that the land had once been a farm belonging to someone named "Weovill".

=== Player's brewery ===
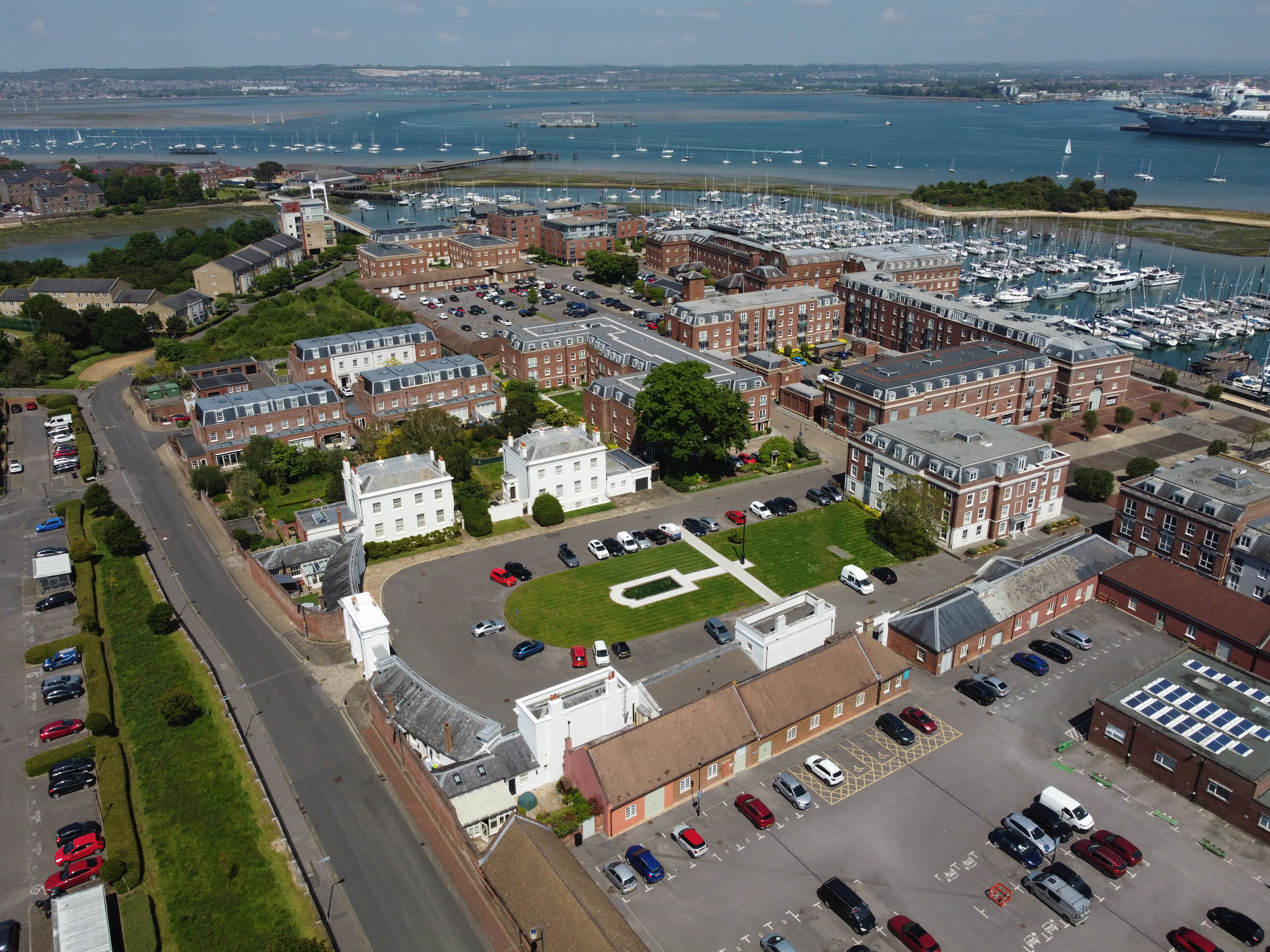
Aerial view of Flagstaff Green. Weevil House once stood close to where the main gate (left) now stands; and at the other end of the green there is now a modern block on the original site of Player's brewhouse.

In 1685 a local brewer, "Captain" Henry Player, inherited a 6-acre (2.4 ha) parcel of waterfront land at Weevil; he founded a brewery on the site and started supplying beer to the Royal Navy. In 1704, he built a three-storey manor house on the same estate, topped with a cupola; known as Weevil House, it was set within formal gardens alongside an orchard.

Player's house stood, surrounded by gardens, at the west end of what is now Flagstaff Green; his 'Great Brewhouse' stood to the east within its own compound, which had a wharf to the waterfront. South of the brewhouse were a cooperage and a beer store (facing each other across a small courtyard); to the north of the brewhouse was a T-plan building consisting of a malt house attached to a storehouse. Water for the brewing process was drawn by means of a windpump from a well in the cooperage courtyard. There were also a number of ancillary buildings on the site and houses for the Master Brewer and the cooper.

=== Purchase of the brewery and the Weevil estate ===
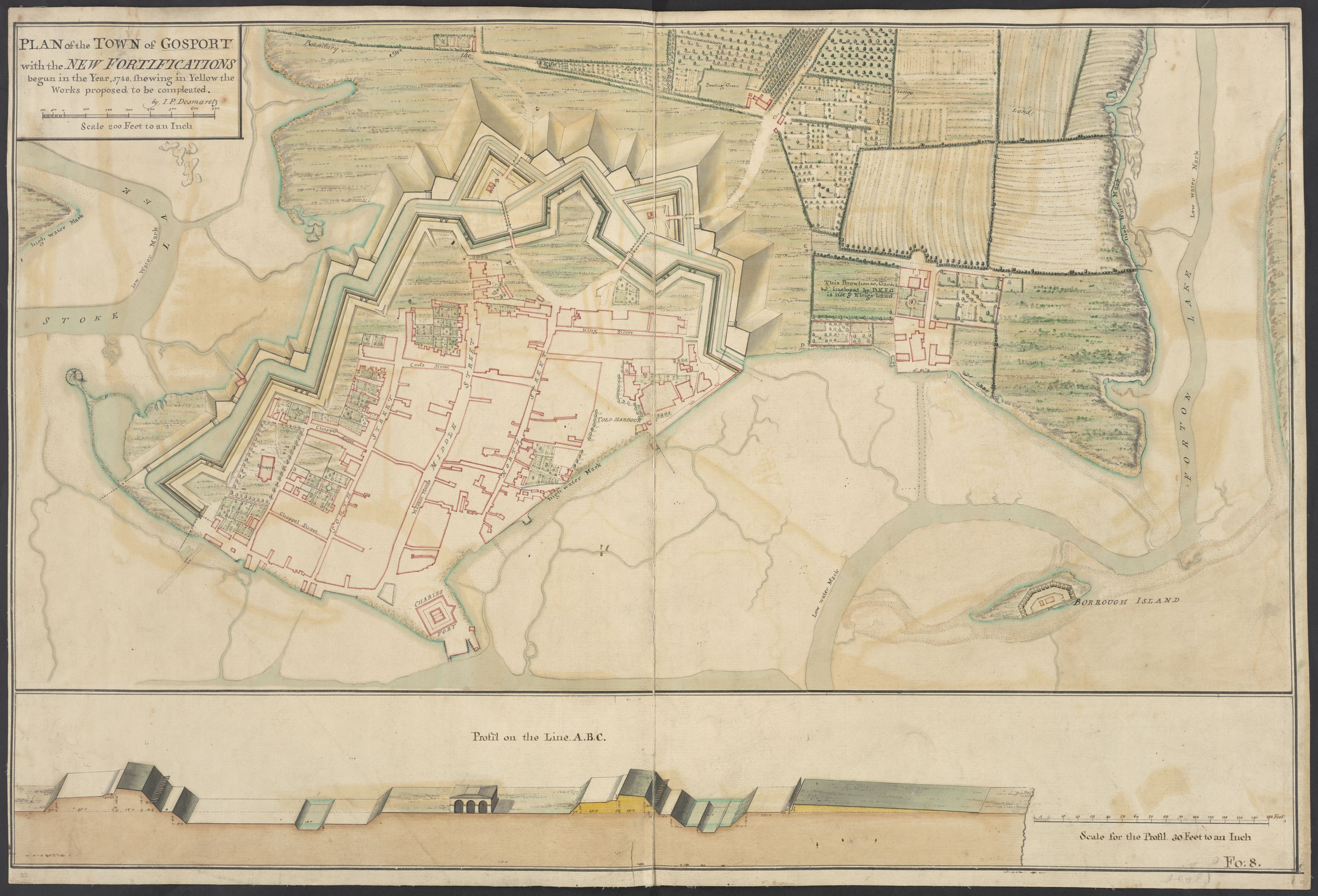
Map of Gosport by Desmaretz (c. 1748). To the right (i.e. north of the fortified town) Weevil House and garden can be seen, with the brewery complex below it.

Henry Player died in 1711 but the brewery continued to be managed by members of his family until 1751. In that year, the brewery was purchased by the Victualling Commissioners with a view to consolidating their brewing operations in Portsmouth on a single site. The complex was soon extended: the start of the Seven Years' War prompted the Commissioners to build an additional brewhouse in 1756 to meet increased demand (it was built in place of the malt house, since malting no longer took place on the site); the adjoining storehouse was also extended to the north. Close by, a square reservoir was built to supply the new brewhouse with water; it also provided water for other uses around the yard.

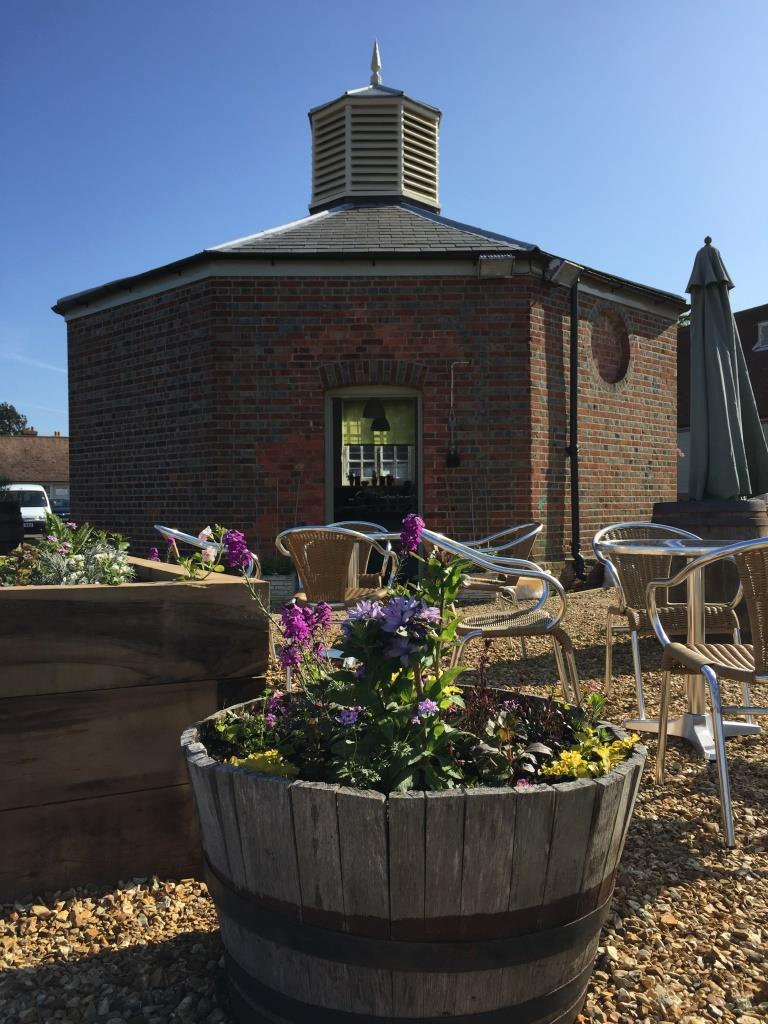
Cooperage pump house, dating from 1778; it originally contained a horse pump.

Henry Player's daughter, who had continued to live in Weevil House, died in 1758. The house (together with its gardens and the rest of the Weevil estate) was then purchased by the Commissioners (but no new buyer could be found for the house itself, and it was demolished in 1772). The purchase allowed the brewery to expand; and thus in 1766 a much larger cooperage was built by the Commissioners, made up of four ranges of buildings in an irregular quadrangle (these are still in place, and are the oldest surviving buildings in any of the victualling yards).

=== Wyatt's rebuilding ===
In 1780, the decision was taken to replace Player's original 'Great Brewhouse' with a new brewery, to be built alongside the east range of the new cooperage. Construction duly took place in 1781–2 to designs by Samuel Wyatt, with Samuel Whitbread acting as a consultant on improving the brewing process. Wyatt's plans included a pair of long waterfront storehouses for storing beer (in barrels) together with the dry goods used in the brewing process (though in fact only one of the two, the North Store, was completed at this time). The South Store would have been built immediately to the east of the new brewery (the two buildings being connected by a malt mill at the northern end); the North Store was built directly to the east of the 1756 brewhouse and storehouse.

Problems with the water supply to the brewery had led to John Smeaton being brought in to advise on this and other engineering works across the Yard. In 1780 a new pumphouse was built to his design, above a well to the north-west of Wyatt's new brewery (i.e. just north of what is now Flagstaff Green); the pump was driven by a horse engine and was connected to the nearby reservoir (it remained in use until the mid-19th century and was then demolished). In 1788 a further pumphouse was built, to the same design, above another well immediately to the south of Wyatt's brewery; (converted from horse power to steam in 1860, it remained in service for many years afterwards; the building was eventually demolished in the 1970s).

=== Consolidating Portsmouth's victualling establishments ===
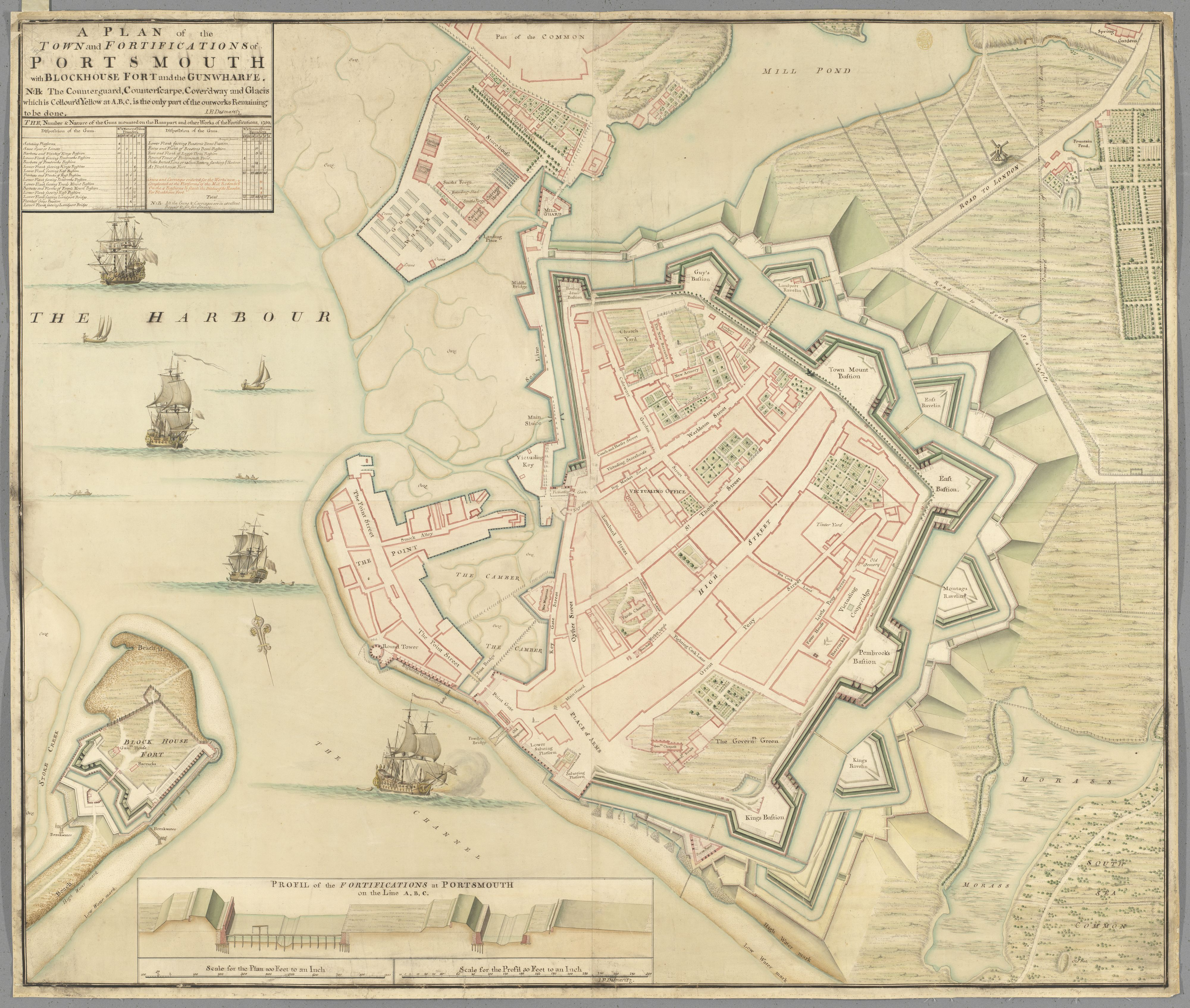
Old Portsmouth in 1750. In the centre is the Victualling Office (and Bakery) on St Thomas's Street. Above it is the Victualling Storehouse; just to the left is the Victualling Gate leading to the Victualling Quay. On the right, by Pembrook's Bastion, is the Victualling Cooperage (and former brewery). At the top is the Mill Pond, with the King's Mill to the left by the Gunwharf.

The challenge of victualling the fleet during the Napoleonic Wars led the Victualling Board to try to consolidate its various manufacturing, storage and distribution operations in Portsmouth on to a single site (as had already been achieved at the Board's principal Yard in Deptford). At the time, it was operating from various premises, mostly in and around Old Portsmouth; these included King's Mill by the Gunwharf (purchased in 1712), a slaughterhouse near the Square Tower, and a bakery and storehouse (established in 1513) on King's Street. All were on constrained sites with limited access.

In 1824 the Victualling Board proposed transferring all these operations to the Weevil site; (they had made a similar recommendation two years earlier in respect of victualling arrangements at Plymouth, which had led to a site being adopted and adapted for the future Royal William Yard in Stonehouse). With regard to Gosport, however, the Admiralty initially resisted the idea; that it went ahead was largely thanks to its being championed by the Duke of Clarence (Lord High Admiral at the time).

=== Taylor's rebuilding ===
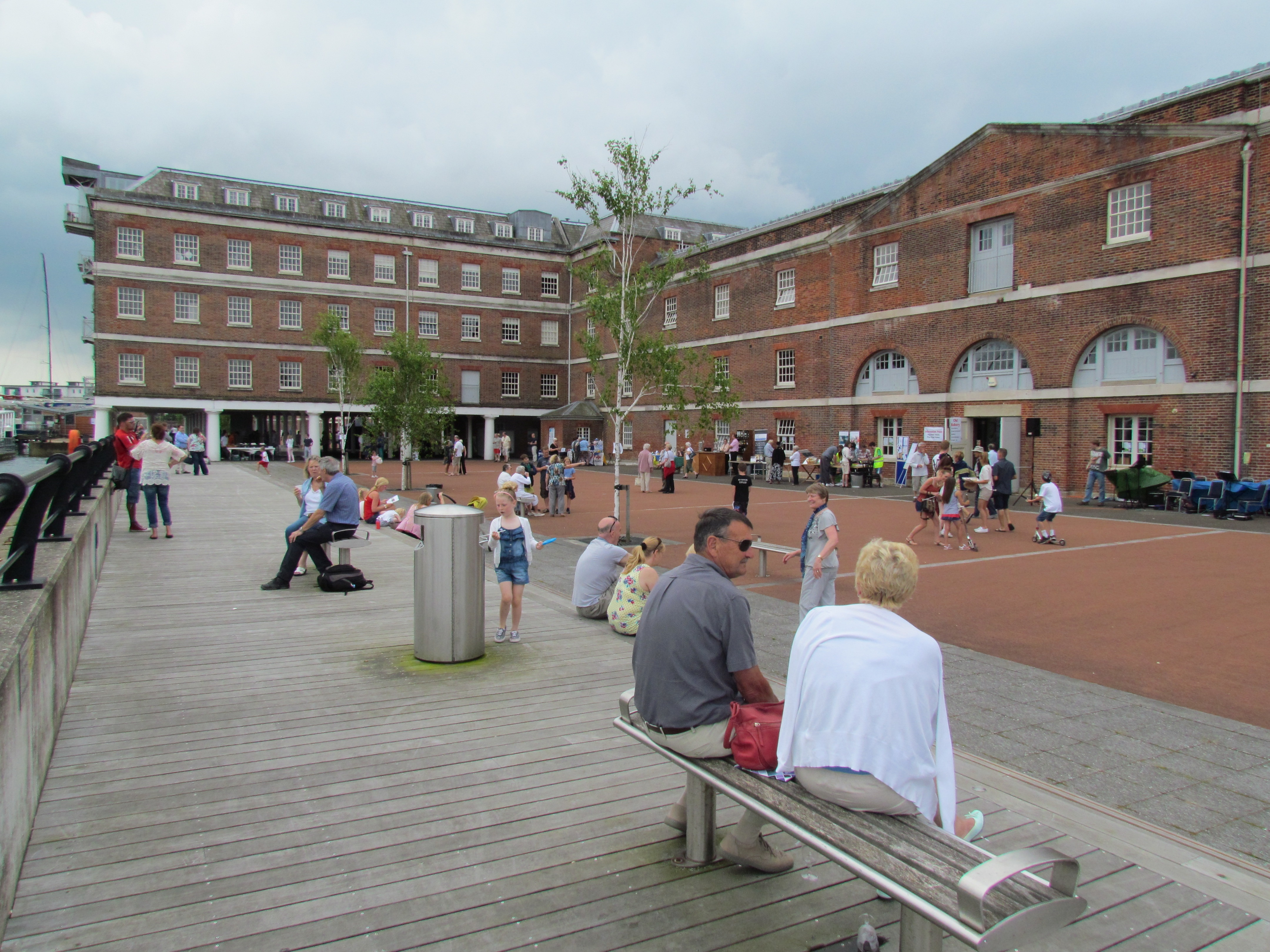
Taylor's Granary (left) and Bakery (right).

By 1828, George Ledwell Taylor was engaged as an architect; he was already involved in modernising Wyatt's brewery, which (along with the adjacent cooperage) was to remain in place and in use as part of the new complex. Wyatt's storehouses were also retained: the North Store would form the south wing of Taylor's new Granary, Storehouse and Bakery complex, while the unfinished South Store was completed and expanded to form a 'New South Store' (which in the 1830s was given over to rum, tea, wine, tobacco and cocoa). At the same time, directly east of the New South Store, land was reclaimed from Portsmouth Harbour to create a sizeable new wharf, on which a timber 'slaughter-house, vegetable store and weighing room' were built, the ground being paved to form a cattle yard.

The most prominent new building in the victualling yard was a combined storehouse, granary, flour mill and bakery, built directly to the north of Wyatt's brewery and storehouse. It consisted of two extended wings built either side of a central four-storey Granary (which projected out on to the edge of the quayside). The two wings functioned as large storehouses, except for the ground floor of the north wing which housed an industrial bakery; the bakery contained state-of-the-art machinery designed by pioneering food technologist Sir Thomas Grant. Although it could produce fresh bread for local consumption, the principal product of the bakery was ship's biscuits; there was space set aside in the building for up to twenty thousand bags (2,000,000 lb (910,000 kg)) of biscuit to be stored. The storehouses also held stocks of flour, oatmeal, raisins, peas and soap, as well as books and clothing for seamen and marines. Behind the south wing a large Salt Meat Store was built, where salted meat was stored in barrels ready to be loaded on to ships. It was made up of six 'vast rooms', containing stocks of beef, pork, suet, vinegar and salt.

The north wing extended behind the Granary to accommodate the flour mill (where grain from the Granary was ground into flour for the bakery); this was powered by a Boulton and Watt steam engine, located to the rear (the engine and the milling machinery were provided by Sir John Rennie). The engine also served to pump water from a newly-sunk well, which was 360 feet (110 m) deep (in contrast to the earlier wells on the site, which extended to depths of between 30 and 42 feet). The fresh water was pumped into a newly built reservoir to the west, from where it could be piped to the quay and transferred by boat to the ships.

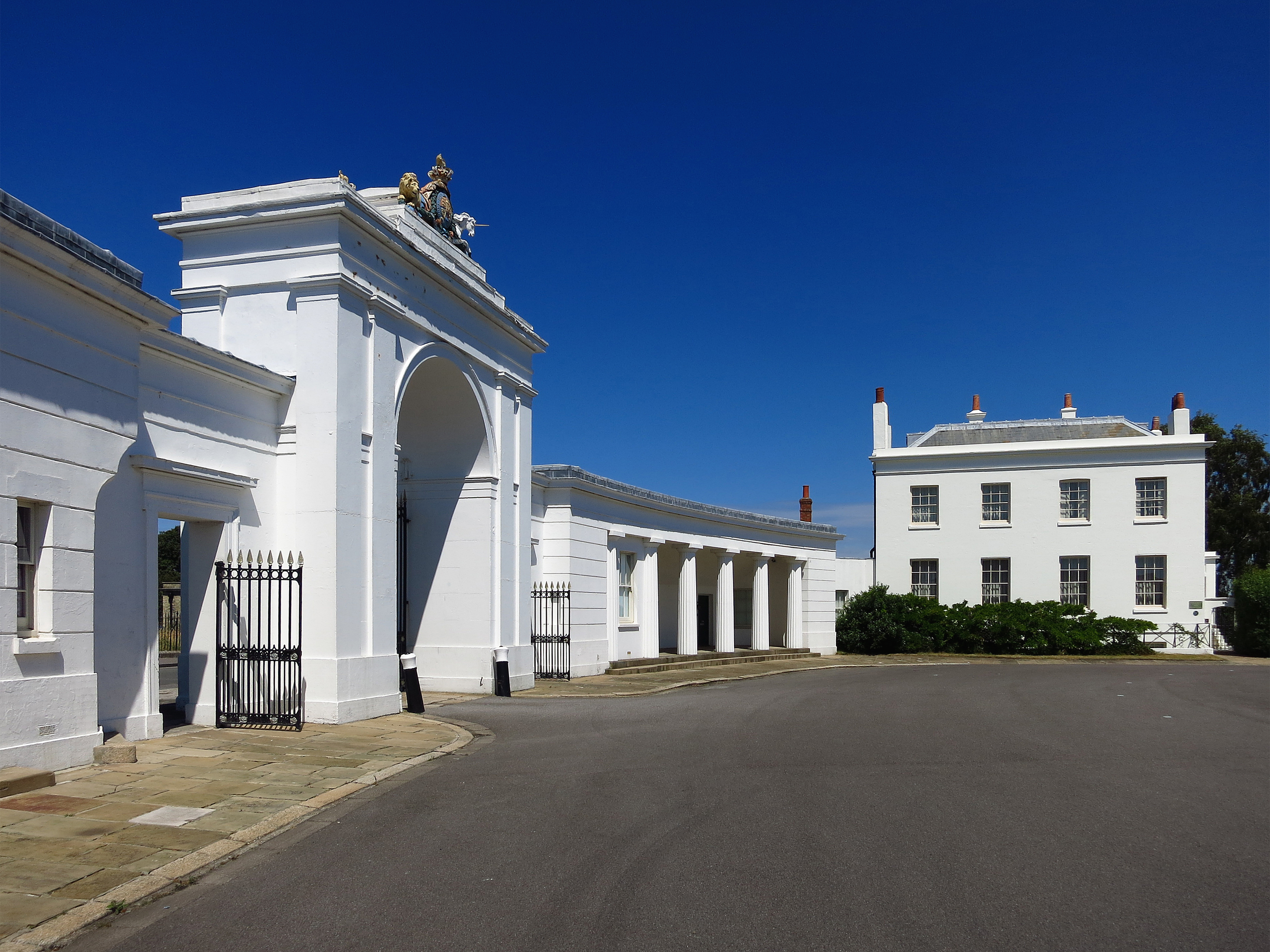
Taylor's main entrance, guardroom and Superintendent's house.

Apart from the brewing, baking and butchering complexes, Taylor built a number of residential and administrative buildings around a large open space (which is now known as Flagstaff Green) just inside the new Main Gate (where Weevil House had once stood). The gate itself was in the form of a triumphal arch, topped on both sides with a sculptural representation of the royal arms. The residences included a pair of large detached dwellings for the two most senior resident officers of the yard. Facing the main gate across Flagstaff Green was the yard's principal office building, which was topped by a small clock-tower.

=== North Meadow expansion ===
Earlier, in 1802–3, a set of workshops and a small barracks had been built (to the north, outside the Weevil estate) for the Royal Military Artificers, who were responsible for maintaining the nearby fortifications. The Artificers, later renamed the Royal Sappers and Miners, remained here until 1829, whereupon the buildings and surrounding land were given over to the Admiralty to become part of the new victualling yard. The workshops subsequently functioned as maintenance sheds for the victualling yard and the barracks block served as the yard's police station. The open area known as the North Meadow, lying between the workshops and the mill/granary, later came to be used as a lairage for livestock.

=== Renaming and reopening ===
On 1 July 1831 the complex was renamed the Royal Clarence Victualling Yard. By the end of 1832 work on the new Yard was all but complete. The Yard remained in service for the next 160 years; several of its buildings have survived to the present day (as listed below).

=== Later history ===
==== 19th century ====
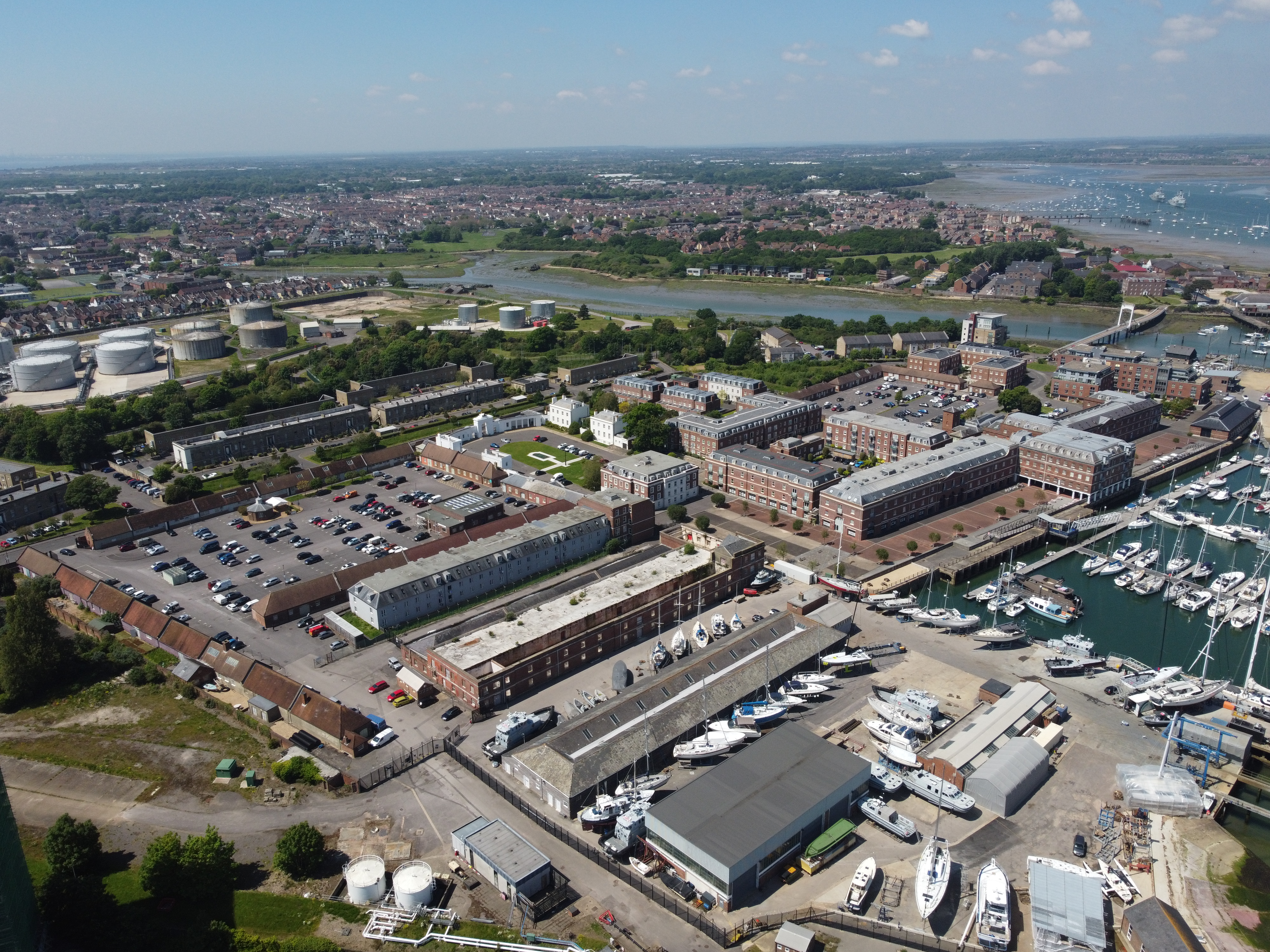
Aerial view of the site in 2024. Centre foreground is the Tank Store (with twin pitched roofs), behind which is the bomb-damaged New South Store; between this and the Cooperage is a new grey building on the site of Wyatt's brewery. The railway entered the yard at the bottom left of the photo.

Wyatt's brewery remained operational well into the 19th century: in 1831 the daily shipboard issue of beer ended (to be replaced by the rum ration), but brewing still continued, albeit on a much smaller scale, until the 1850s (providing beer for the local naval hospital and Royal Marine infirmary). The brewery building also functioned as the beer store, the adjacent South Storehouse having now become a rum and sugar store. In 1860, after on-site brewing had ceased, the brewery building was converted into a clothing (or 'slop') store, though two large vats were retained and used for rum. At the same time,

The railway came to Gosport in 1842, with the opening of the Fareham-Gosport line, and two years later this line was extended onwards into the Royal Clarence yard. (Within the yard an internal railway system was established, linked to the main line, which connected the various storehouses around the site to one another and to the wharves.) The railway entered the yard from the south, just below the New South Store; before the line entered the yard, a spur branched off eastwards towards the nearby slaughterhouse.

The opening of the line to Gosport predated the establishment of a line to Portsmouth, and the Royal Clarence Yard came regularly to be used by Queen Victoria and Prince Albert as a useful embarkation point (particularly after the Queen's purchase of Osborne House in 1845). That year a private station was built for the Queen's use, connected to a designated pontoon ('HM Landing Place') on the quayside.

Use of this area of the victualling yard by the Queen eventually led to the relocation of the slaughterhouse: in 1854-5 a new brick slaughterhouse was built at the opposite end of the site, just north of the Bakery; a number of cattle sheds or 'lairs' were also built nearby (where live animals were kept and inspected prior to slaughter), which could be accessed either by way of a separate road entrance or via a designated section of the wharf.

==== 20th century ====
Salted meat continued to be provided to HM Ships into the 20th century, though by then it was imported from America (rather than prepared on site). Fresh meat was still required: it was regularly dispatched (to ships at anchor in Spithead, to the local Royal Marines Division and to Haslar Naval Hospital) and for this reason the slaughterhouse continued to operate (in 1901 between eighty and a hundred cattle were slaughtered there every week). The Bakery was routinely producing 11,000 lb (5,000 kg) of biscuit daily at the start of the 20th century (with the capacity to produce double that amount if needs required it); it appears to have remained in operation until after the First World War (whereupon it too was converted into a storehouse). The cessation of salted beef production meant that fewer barrels were required by 1901, but these continued to be manufactured on site (indeed the Royal Clarence cooperage continued producing barrels, using traditional methods, until the early 1970s). The yard continued to provide ships with fresh water; at the start of the century there were two artesian wells on site, each one over 350 feet (110 m) deep, from which water was conveyed via hosepipes to specialised 'tank vessels' which then brought the water to the ships.

During the Second World War the Yard was kept very busy. It suffered during the Blitz with several buildings being damaged or destroyed by bombs, including the south wing of the Granary complex, the Salt Meat Store, the Main Offices, Wyatt's Brewery and the northern edge of the Cooperage. After the war new buildings were added: a Cold Meat Store was built in the 1950s (where the Salt Meat Store had previously stood) and a new L-plan office block in place of the old office building. From 1961 the Navy's food laboratories were based at the yard; over the next thirty years they undertook innovative work there on food production and preservation (e.g. freeze-drying).

With the closure of the cooperage in 1970, the yard ceased to be a place of manufacturing; but large volumes of provisions continued to be stored in, and distributed from, the Yard until it (along with Plymouth's Royal William Yard) was closed in 1991.

== Present day ==
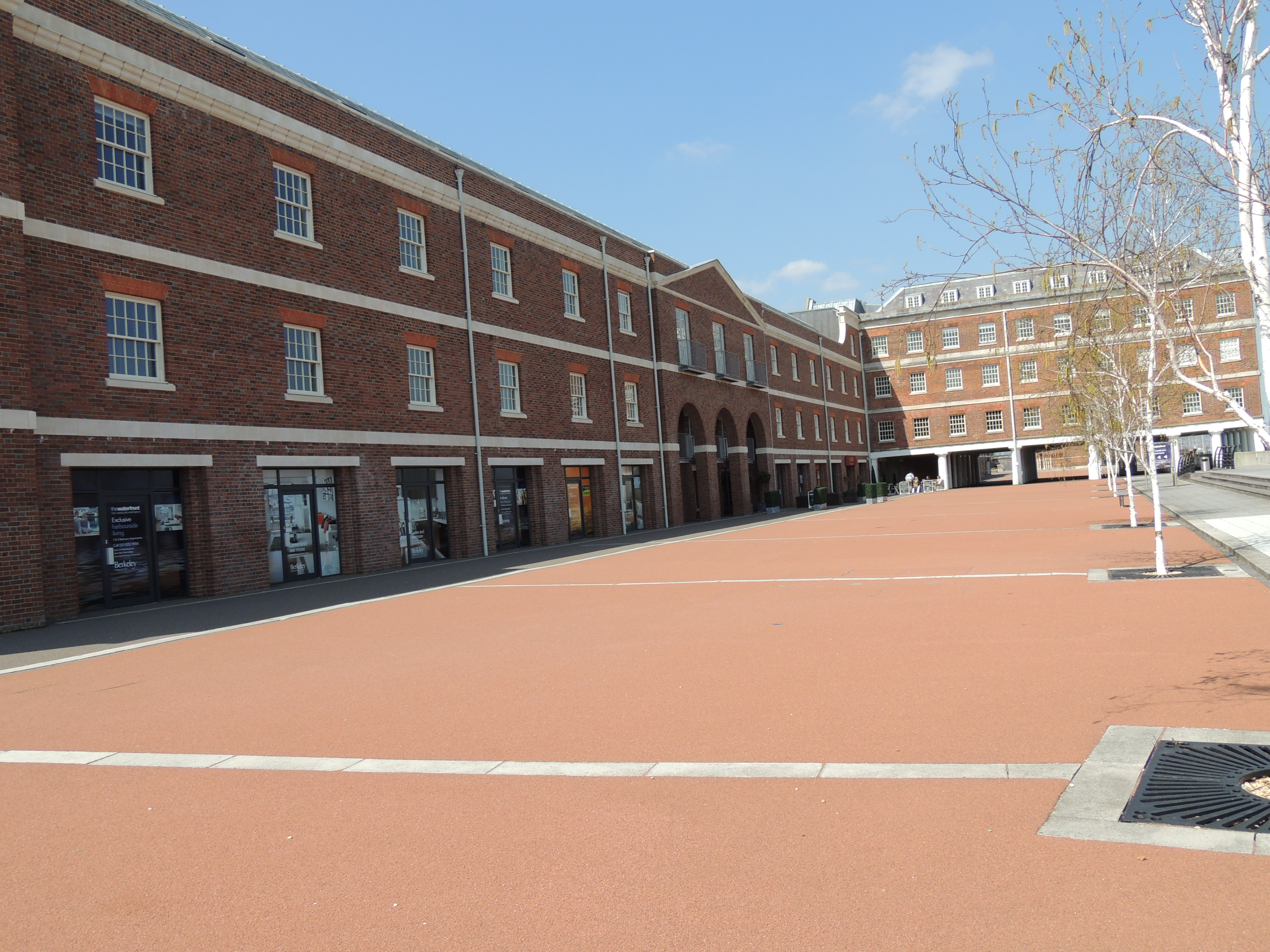
Rebuilt (21st-century) south wing (left) and original (19th-century) Granary (right).

In 1998, the northern part of the site was acquired by Berkeley Homes. As part of its redevelopment in the early 2000s several new buildings were constructed; most post-war buildings were demolished, but the older buildings were refurbished and some destroyed buildings reinstated (most notably the missing south wing of the Granary complex). The project was awarded a commendation at the 2009 Royal Town Planning Institute Awards.

The northern part of Royal Clarence Yard is now a mixed-use development open to the public including approximately 500 residential dwellings, workshops, artist galleries, cafes, restaurants, retail units and a marina (operated by Castle Marinas).

With the exception of the Cooperage area, the southern part of the site was initially retained by the Ministry of Defence in order to protect its access to the adjacent Oil Fuel Jetty (connected to the OPA depot at Forton). The MoD announced in 2014 its intention to dispose of the 'Retained Area' in the southern part of Royal Clarence Yard, but this did not happen immediately. In June 2017, Gosport Borough Council included Royal Clarence Yard as a "Character Area" and proposals for its eventual development in a draft "Waterfront and Town Centre Supplementary Planning Document". In November 2018, the MoD put the 5.2-acre (2.1 ha) site up for sale, emphasizing its 'full deep-water access to Portsmouth Harbour, making it ideally suitable for commercial marine activity'. The following year the site was purchased by the South Shields-based UK Docks, with a view to redeveloping it as 'a unique specialist marine hub'.

== Notable buildings ==
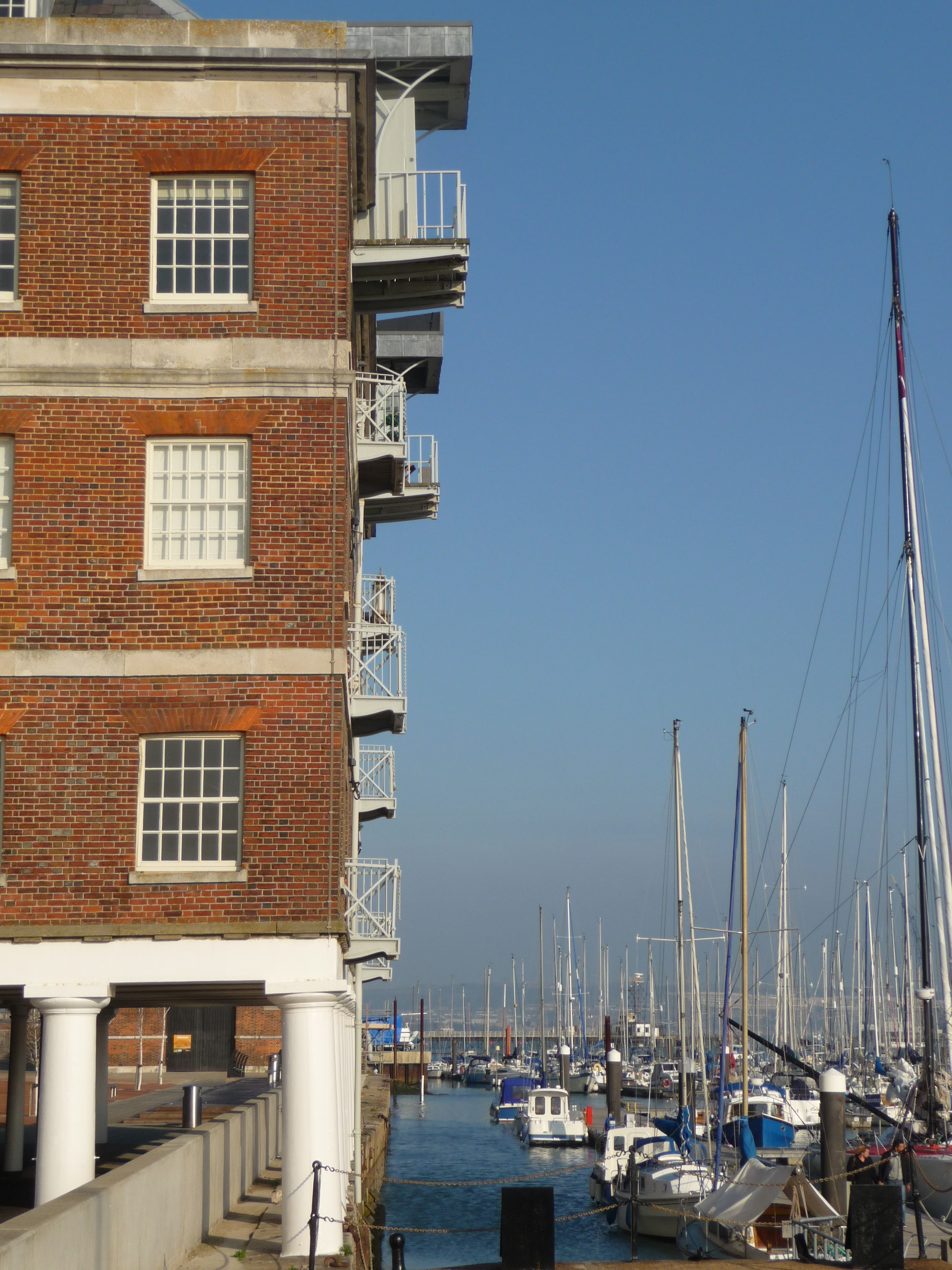
The Granary is part of a Grade II* listed building.

Royal Clarence Yard was designated a Conservation Area by Gosport Borough Council in 1990. The site is significant due to its place in British industrial history as "one of the first large industrial food processing plants in the country" and for the quality and style of the buildings, several of which have Listed Building status.

=== The Cooperage and the Pump House ===
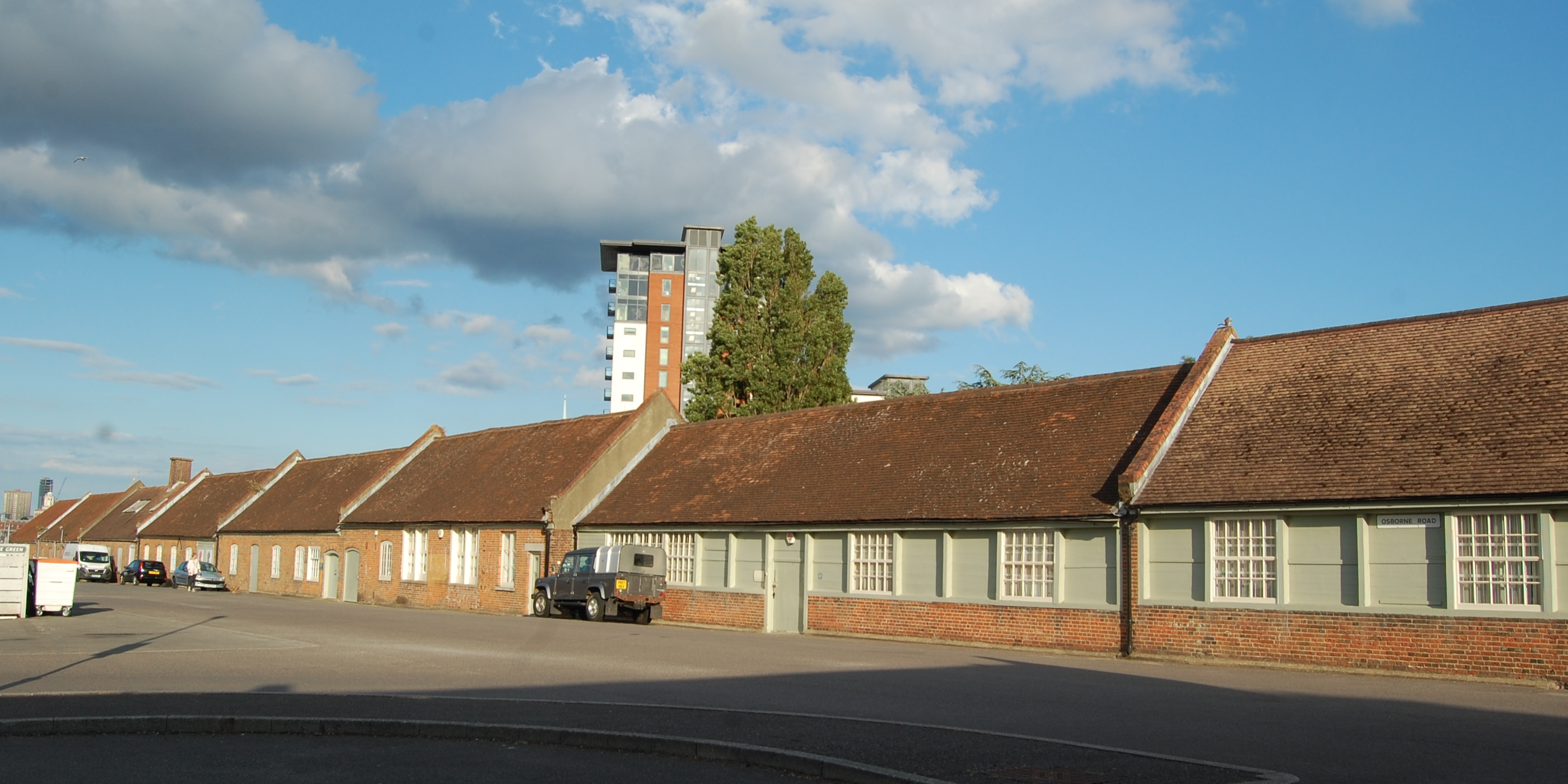
The Cooperage (south range)

The Cooperage consists of single story workshops set around a large square, most of which were constructed between 1765 and 1766 next to the Weevil Brewery (on the site of an earlier cooperage). The South, West and East Ranges are all Grade II Listed buildings; whereas the North Range was significantly damaged in the Second World War and afterwards rebuilt.

Originally used for the manufacture of casks, some of the workshops were later adapted for other uses as the needs of the Navy changed. By the 1890s the coopers still occupied the west half of the quadrangle, but much of the eastern half was given over to storage (a large single-storey cask store having been built within the eastern half of the quadrangle in the 1850s); there were also seasoning sheds and a sawmill. The extended South Range of workshops by this time accommodated smiths, plumbers, shipwrights and lamps. The last cooper to work at Royal Clarence Yard was Michael Whitaker, who joined as an apprentice aged 14 in 1949 and left when the Yard finally closed in 1990.

The Pump House in the Cooperage is an octagonal Grade II Listed Building built in 1778 of brick with a pyramidal louvred roof. It was originally designed to house the horse engine which pumped water from the well beneath to the Weevil Brewhouse nearby. The cask store was demolished between the wars; where it had stood, a telephone exchange was built in the 1950s (it is now used by the local Sea Cadets).

=== The North Meadow Workshops ===
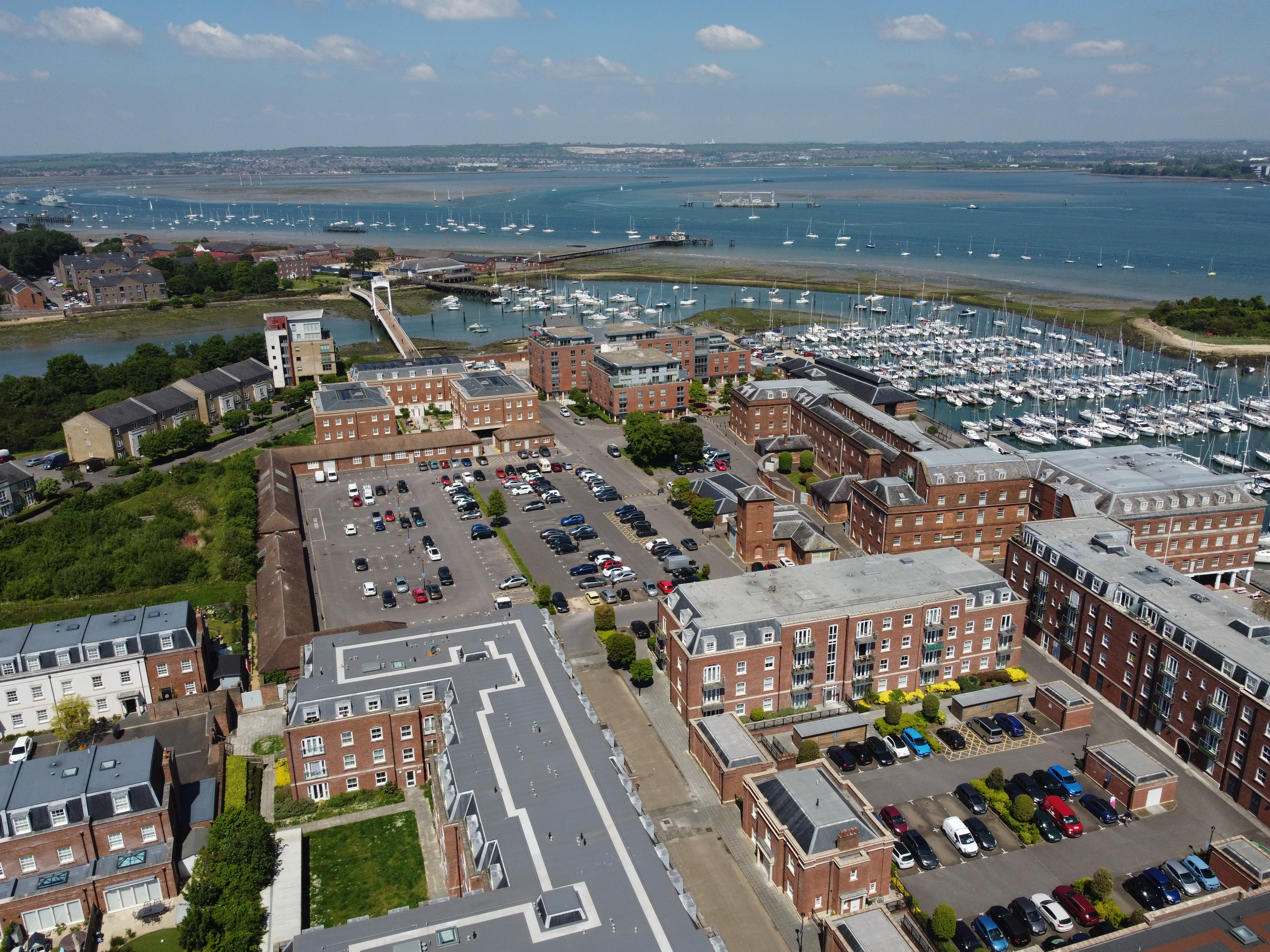
The North Meadow Workshops (centre-left), the Hydraulic Engine House (centre-right) and the rear of the Granary (right).

Built in 1802-3 for the Royal Military Artificers, the workshops are set in three ranges forming an open quadrangle. (The Artificers' barracks, which later served as the yard's police station, originally stood on the fourth side of the square; it was demolished in the 20th century). The workshops are Grade II listed. The complex housed various artisans, including wheelwrights, carpenters, coopers, blacksmiths and bricklayers, all of whom were involved in the construction and maintenance of military buildings and fortifications. The north part of the west range housed a forge, and the short south range contained a saw pit.

Originally, these Artificers' workshops stood outside the brewery compound; a boundary wall (a section of which can still be seen abutting the south range of the workshops) originally marked the northern edge of the Weevil estate: a section of it, possibly dating from 1704, is believed to be the oldest surviving structure on the site. Originally, the entrance to the Artificers' Barracks had been from the west (through a gateway halfway along that side of the quadrangle). After the barracks became part of the victualling yard, this entrance was blocked (by the reservoir) and an entrance was formed on the north side, to serve as a secondary entrance to the victualling yard (the 'North Gate'). The way through was flanked by the clerk-of-works' office on one side and a guardroom on the other.

=== The granary, bakery, flour mill, stores, and attached boiler and engine house ===
This is a complex of late-Georgian style, red-brick buildings mainly dating from 1828 to 1830; it has Grade II* Listed Building status. (The listing includes later additions to the rear, namely an engine and boiler house (added in 1862–3) and the Master Baker's office (added in 1873).) The north wing of the building contains the former Bakery; it retains its original large bread ovens and has been converted into a restaurant. Other parts of the building contain apartments. The (unlisted) south wing dates from the early 2000s, the old south wing having been destroyed in the Second World War. (This wing was originally the North Store, built by Samuel Wyatt in 1782; a fragment of its façade has survived within the west wall of the central Granary block.)

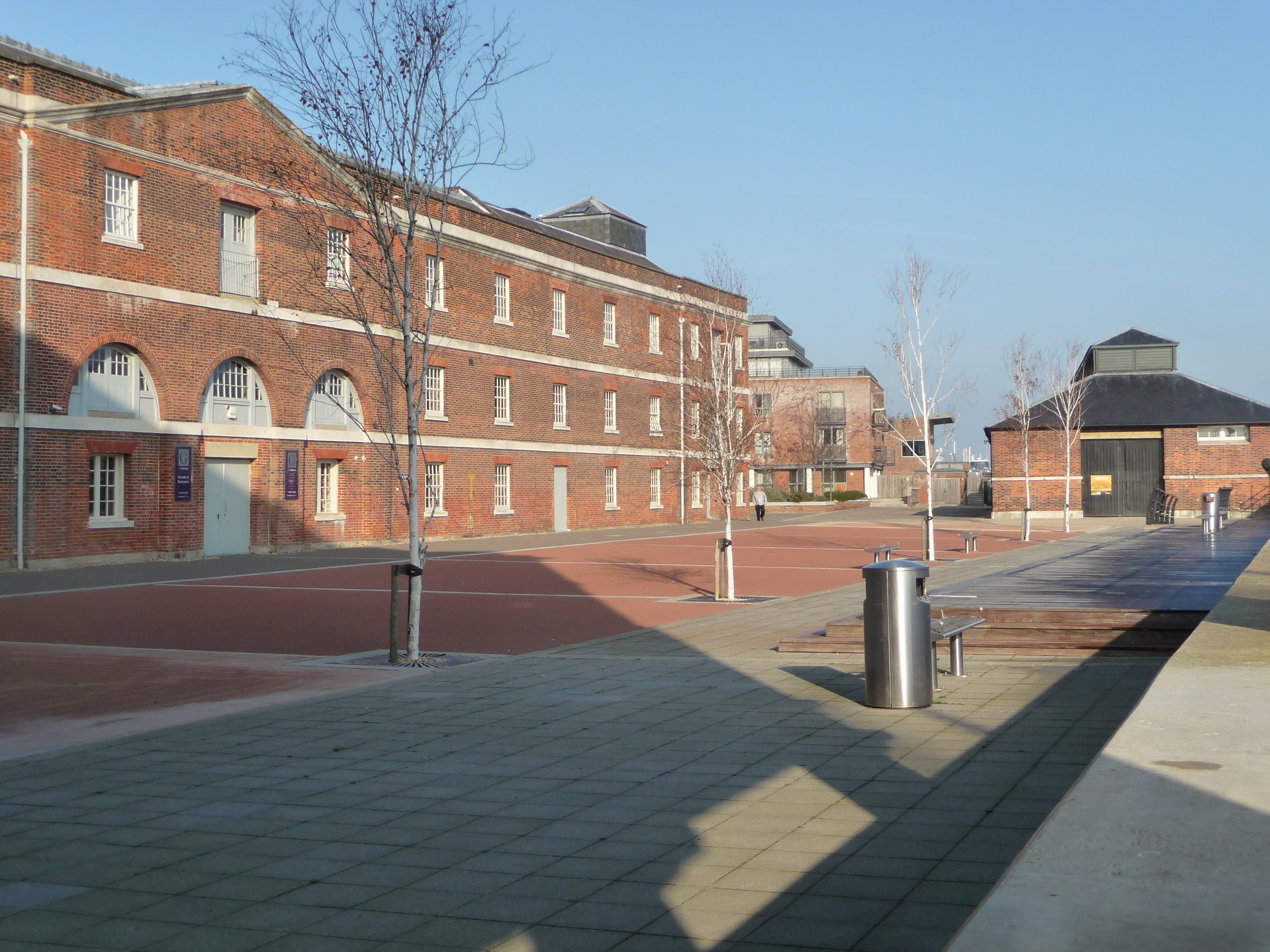
The Bakery at Royal Clarence Yard

When originally built, the central Granary building contained four granaries, each holding 1,500 quarters of grain. The flour mill to the rear contained ten pairs of millstones, worked by a steam engine at the back of the same building, which produced forty bushels of biscuit meal flour every hour. The flour was stored in the upper floor of the north wing, ready for use; when required it was conveyed from there to the bakery, on the ground floor. The bakery was provided with innovative machinery (driven by the same engine as the mill) which mixed the flour with water, before kneading the dough and rolling it to the right thickness; the resultant sheet of dough (which measured around 2 yards by 1 yard) was then cut (not quite through) into sixty hexagonal biscuit shapes each stamped with the broad arrow, before being delivered to the ovens for baking. The mixing took two minutes, the kneading five minutes and the baking ten to twelve minutes. There were nine individually-fired ovens, which between them could bake ten thousand biscuits an hour (or a ton of bread). After baking, the sheets were separated into individual biscuits, which were placed into sacks and left in a drying room for three days, before being moved to the store.

As well as driving the millstones and the bakery, the 45-horsepower steam engine was used to pump water into the reservoir at the north-west corner of the site; it also powered the hoists at the front of the granary, and was connected by way of overhead line shafting to various other machines that cleaned the wheat, dressed the flour and conveyed it through the building. A smaller (10 horsepower) engine was also provided, which was used to drive the biscuit-making machinery at times when the main engine was not operating; later the smaller engine was given its own engine and boiler house, built on to the rear of the bakery.

=== The Rum Store (New South Store) ===
Standing due south of the Granary complex, the New South Store (later referred to as the Rum Store) is a long Grade II Listed Building, parts of which date from 1758. The building was altered in 1830 (as part of George Taylor's development of the former brewery into the new Naval Victualling Yard), when it was given an extra storey and a new facade, to match the new North Store nearby (i.e. the south wing of the Granary). It was remodelled again in 1897-8 and severely damaged during a bombardment in 1940. The building was originally used to store dry goods for the brewery and later used for storing rum and sugar. In October 2025 work was due to begin on rebuilding and restoring the Rum Store.

=== Main gate and two lodges ===
The ceremonial entrance to Royal Clarence Yard, designed by George Taylor and built in 1830–31, the main gate and flanking lodges are built of brick, stuccoed on the interior front, in the late Georgian style. The gate and lodges have Grade II* Listed Building status. The Arch is topped by a double-sided painted Coad Stone Royal Crest.

=== Superintendent's and deputy superintendent's houses; Police House, Flagstaff Green ===
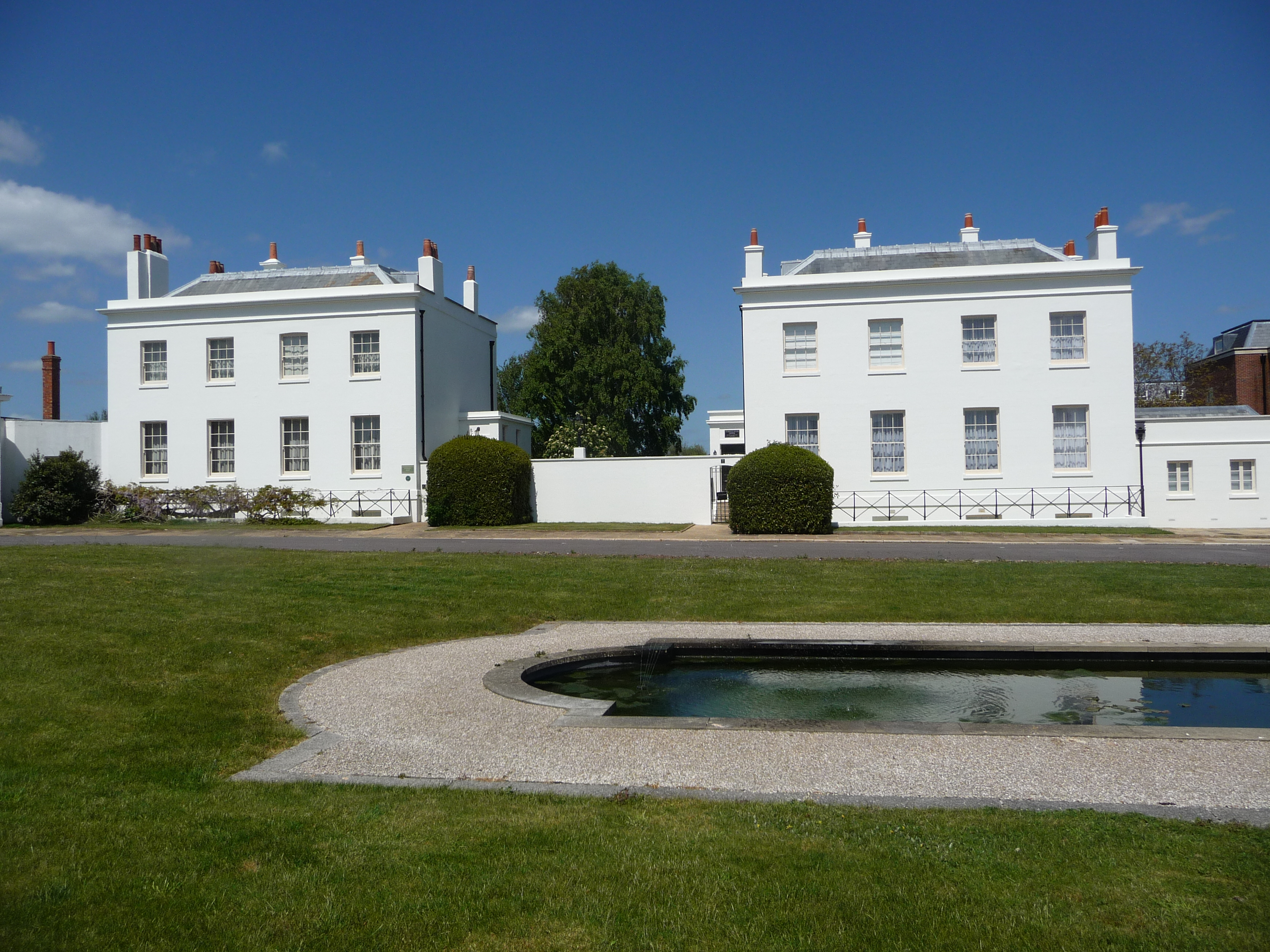
Houses built for the yard's superintendent (left) and his deputy (right).

On the north side of Flagstaff Green, just inside the Main Gate, are a pair of houses which were designed and built in stuccoed brick by George Taylor in 1830–31 as dwellings for the Victualling Yard's senior resident officers. When the yard opened, in 1832, the west house was occupied by the Master Attendant and east by the Storekeeper; after 1869 they were occupied, respectively, by the Superintendent Storekeeper and the Chief Clerk. Both buildings have Grade II Listed Building status.

On the south side of the green, the Police House (Residence 6) is a Grade II Listed Building designed and built by George Taylor at the same time as the Main Gate, the Lodges and the other officer's residences surrounding Flagstaff Green. Built of stuccoed brick in the late Georgian style, this building was for some time used as the residence of the Yard's Inspector of Police.

=== The Tank Store and Steam Fire Engine House ===
Lying parallel to the Rum Store (q.v.), the Tank Store is a long, Grade II Listed, 23 bay shed, originally built in 1833 with open sides. Timber-framed walls were added shortly after construction. The store's main purpose was the "care and maintenance of ships' water storage tanks" and is the only known surviving example of a purpose-built bulk tank storage unit. A continuous lean-to was added on the western side of the Store in 1870 (for the cleaning of water tanks). The Fire Engine House was added in 1892.

=== The Reservoir ===
A triangular reservoir was built in 1833, alongside the North Meadow workshops, as part of a series of improvements to the site's water infrastructure. Designed by George Rennie, its primary purpose was to ensure that the fleet would have a reliable supply of fresh water from the yard (it was supplied with water from the yard's wells and pumphouses). Still in place, but much overgrown, it is considered a 'non-designated heritage asset'.

=== Royal Victoria Station ===
Opened in 1845, the station consisted of a single curved platform, 520 feet (160 m) in length, with an attached waiting room and a canopy extending over the track; it was linked to the quayside by a covered corridor. The station continued to be used by Queen Victoria up until her death in 1901. Today only a fragment of the station remains (the rest having been removed, along with the railway itself, in the wake of the Second World War); it is identified as a 'non-designated heritage asset'.

=== The Slaughterhouse ===
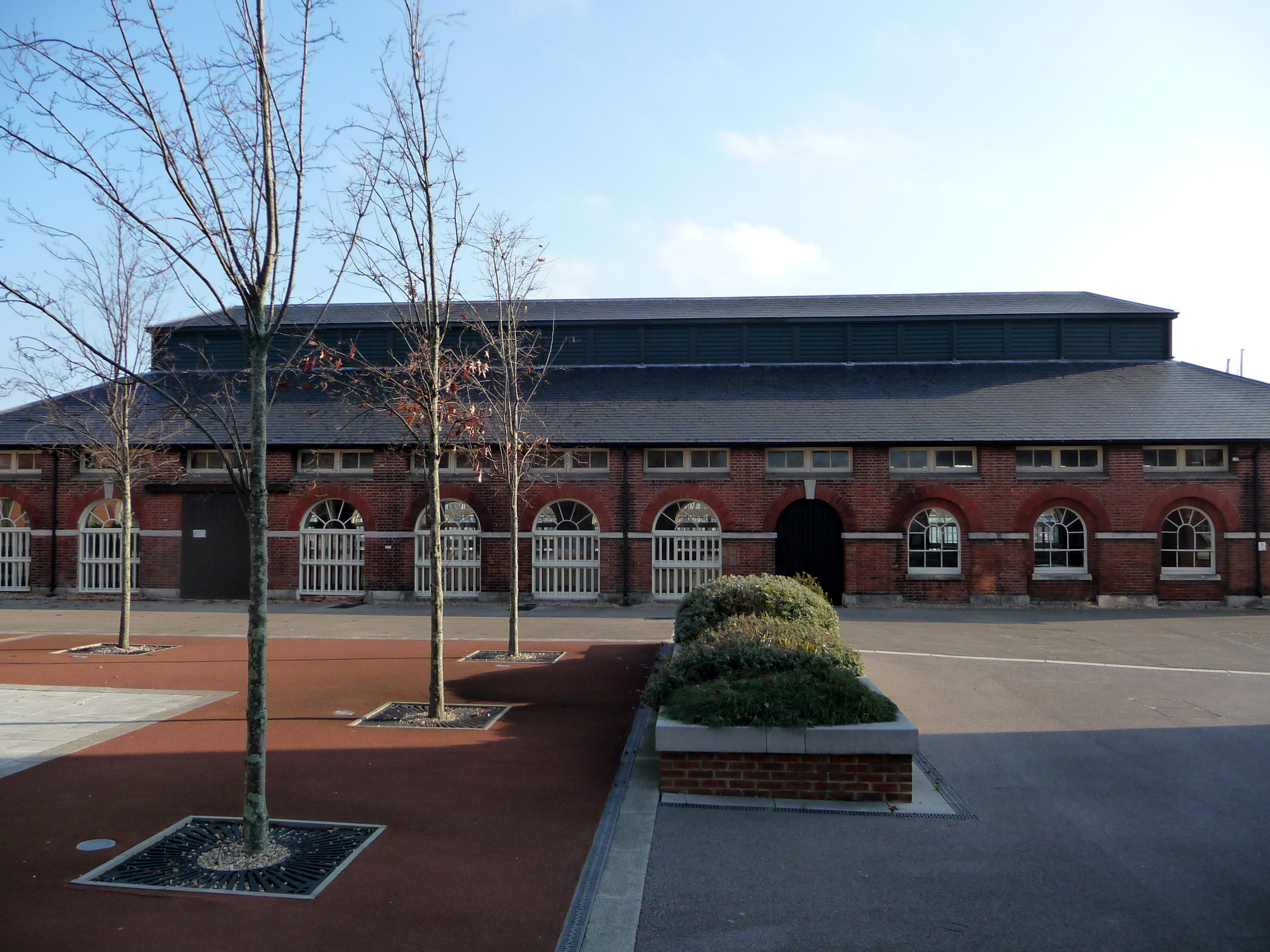
The Slaughterhouse at Royal Clarence Yard

The Slaughterhouse is an Italianate style, red-brick building with Grade II Listed Building status. It was built in 1854 following a decision to move the slaughtering facility from its former location close to the mooring for the Royal Yacht due to many complaints from the Royal Household about 'offensive effluvia' from the old slaughterhouse.

=== The Hydraulic Engine House ===
In 1859-60 an Engine, Boiler and Accumuator house was built, just west of the Granary, to provide hydraulic power to the bakery and the mill, and to hydraulic cranes on the quayside, and to pump water to the reservoir (the engine house was built above a deep well). The hydraulic engine house is a Grade II listed building.

== Officers of the victualling yard ==
In 1831, the newly commissioned victualling yard was overseen by a Commissioner (who also had charge of the nearby Royal Naval Hospital at Haslar). The following year, the Victualling Commissioners having been disestablished, the Admiralty announced that "Capt. H. Garrett, Commissioner of the Royal Clarence Victualling-yard and the Royal Hospital at Haslar, is appointed Captain Superintendent of the same".

As Captain Superintendent he continued to serve in a 'double-hatted' capacity, both as commanding officer of the victualling yard and as commanding officer of the Royal Hospital Haslar. Although in the victualling yard he exercised "a general superintendence and authority over every officer and man employed, whether within the storehouses or upon the quay", he resided at the hospital and it was there that he had "his most important duties".

The senior resident officers of the victualling yard at this time were the Master Attendant and the Storekeeper: the former had oversight of the 'outdoor' workforce (managing the work of the quay and controlling the victualling craft), while the latter oversaw the 'indoor' workforce (having charge of the storehouses and manufactories, and also of the clerical staff). The Captain Superintendent would be in attendance daily, but usually only for an hour or two and in the absence of the Captain Superintendent the Master Attendant took command of the yard (though the Storekeeper also received commands directly from the Comptroller of Victualling in London).

Following a review of the Victualling Establishments in 1869, the positions of Captain Superintendent and Master Attendant were abolished. In their place a civilian 'Superintendent Storekeeper' was appointed to be in overall charge of the yard and its operations (while for disciplinary purposes the establishments were deemed to be under the authority of the Port Admiral).

== See also ==
- Victualling Commissioners (1683–1832)
- Victualling Department (Royal Navy) (1832–1964)
- Royal Victoria Victualling Yard (Deptford)
- Royal William Victualling Yard (Plymouth)
