= Stokes Bay line =

Railway in the UK

The Stokes Bay line was a short railway branch line in Hampshire, England, near Gosport. Associated with a new pier, it was intended to give direct and easy access from trains to steamers to the Isle of Wight in comparison to the conventional route through Portsmouth, which required a road transport connection through the town. Railway operation to the Stokes Bay pier started in 1863.

Through coaches were operated from London and elsewhere, but the railway route was indirect. The pier at Stokes Bay was in an exposed position, and berthing of the steamers was difficult in bad weather. As an independent company, the line's operators were reliant on the goodwill of the London and South Western Railway (LSWR), as well as the efficiency of an associated ferry company. The LSWR had concluded a co-operation agreement with a competitor and did not wish to disturb the new-found harmony; the ferry company failed financially.

Despite the adversities, the company continued operating, but the call on workers and war materiel brought about closure of the line in 1915. Some work in connection with the Admiralty continued for a few years after closure as a public railway.

== History ==
=== The Isle of Wight ===
Queen Victoria and Prince Albert acquired Osborne House, near East Cowes, in 1845, and expressed great pleasure in staying there. This encouraged appreciation of the Isle of Wight in the public imagination, and there was a great increase in holidays there. A difficulty was the journey to reach the island. The route from Southampton to Cowes by steamer was feasible, but a shorter journey via Portsmouth was somewhat quicker. Even so the LSWR journey was via Bishopstoke (later named Eastleigh) and the London, Brighton and South Coast Railway went via Brighton. The greatest difficulty for a Victorian family going on holiday was getting from Portsmouth station to a steamer berth for the crossing. The Portsmouth station was the present day Portsmouth & Southsea railway station, the Harbour extension not being built until 1879.

Two businessmen, William Pearson and Charles Ridout, formed a partnership with a plan to make a better ferry crossing, and on 21 November 1854 registered the intention to make an independent railway line to a new pier at Stokes Bay on the coast, from the Gosport railway station of the LSWR. Stokes Bay was the nearest point on the mainland to Ryde, Isle of Wight, 2 1/2 miles away, so a short crossing of the Solent would be possible. They formed a company, "The Stokes Bay and Isle of Wight Railway and Pier Company." The plan was to build 1 1/2 miles of new railway; trains would run onto the pier, and the transfer to the steamer would be direct and easy.

A ferry operation was essential to make the scheme viable, and a separate Isle of Wight Ferry Company was floated on 21 July 1856 by the Isle of Wight Ferry Act 1856 (19 & 20 Vict. c. cxii). With capital of £20,000 it was to make and operate a floating bridge between Stokes Bay and Ryde. This was to be a chain ferry, in which the vessel was permanently attached to a fixed chain between Stokes Bay and Ryde.

=== Design of a route, and authorisation ===
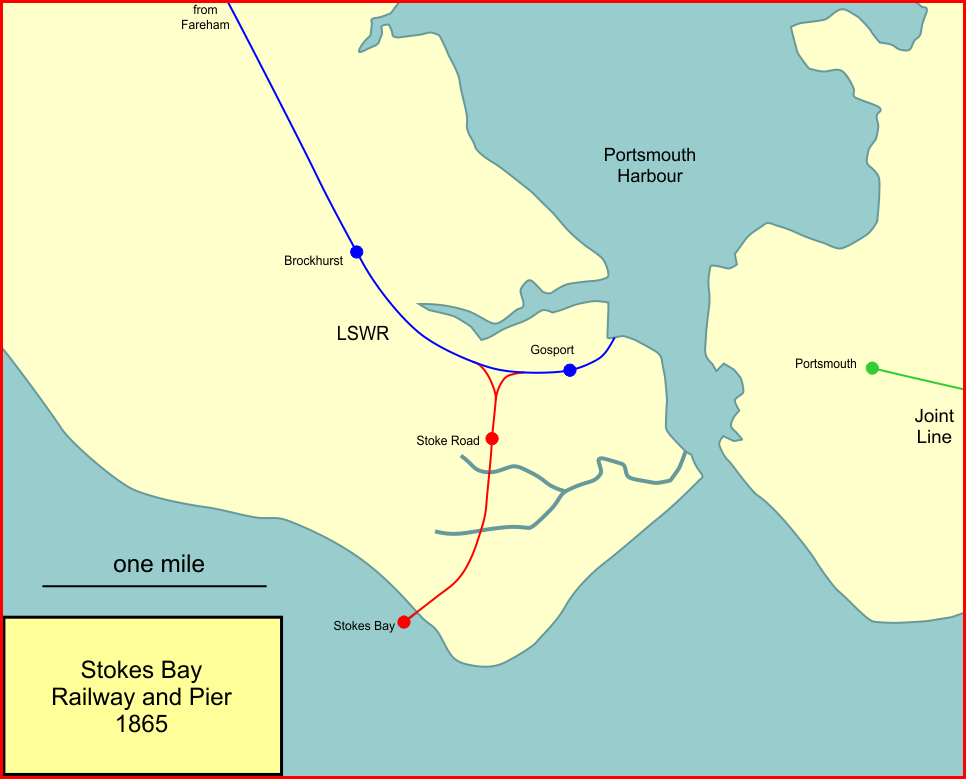
Stokes bay railway

By January 1855 the route had been surveyed and estimated to cost about £30,000. Landowners affected had been approached and it was claimed that they were supportive. The co-operation of the LSWR was key to the success of the scheme, but for the time being the LSWR was non-committal, and certainly unwilling to offer financial support. The company had appointed an engineer, Hamilton Henry Fulton, and he had arranged for contractors, Smith and Knight, to build the line. The contractor agreed to be paid partly in the company's shares, to the extent of £14,000. Established ferry operators were hostile at this new competition, but the company agreed that the pier would be available to other operators, and the chain ferry idea was not proceeded with.

Stokes Bay Railway and Pier Act 1855
- Act of Parliament
- Parliament of the United Kingdom
- Long title: An Act for making a Railway and Pier to and at Stokes Bay in the County of Hants.
- Citation: 18 & 19 Vict. c. cxcii

Dates
- Royal assent: 14 August 1855

Text of statute as originally enacted

The Stokes Bay Railway and Pier Act 1855 (18 & 19 Vict. c. cxcii) received royal assent on 14 August 1855. The cost of construction was estimated at £20,000 of which £7,000 was for the pier itself. The authorised share capital was £24,000, and the work was to be completed within three years.

The first general meeting of the new company was held on 3 October 1855. The chairman, Thomas Fleming, told the meeting that there was every probability of the railway being used by Her Majesty in preference to the existing route; moreover he said that Prince Albert had visited the site of the pier in company with General Sir Frederick Smith, Chief Inspecting Officer of Railways for the Board of Trade, although little is known of this visit. In fact the Queen never used Stokes Bay, always using the Royal Clarence Yard at Gosport.

=== Construction delayed ===
Much time passed without any construction being undertaken, while the cost estimate for the construction climbed; now it was £40,000 due to measures required by the LSWR for safe operation; moreover land acquisition was now estimated to cost £10,735. It was necessary to apply to Parliament for an extension of time for construction.

The company negotiated with the LSWR for the latter to operate the line; agreement was reached on 9 March 1858 for an annual rental of £1,600, the figure later increased to £1,800. (Note: Williams quotes £16,000 and £18,000 respectively on page 99; those figures equate to about £1.6 million and £1.8 million in 2022; for an annual rental they appear to be too high and Robertson’s figures seem more likely. Carter also says £1,800.)

Stokes Bay Railway and Pier Act 1858
- Act of Parliament
- Parliament of the United Kingdom
- Long title: An Act for extending the Time for the Completion of the Works authorized by "The Stokes Bay Railway and Pier Act, 1855;" and for other Purposes.
- Citation: 21 & 22 Vict. c. l

Dates
- Royal assent: 28 June 1858

Agreement was reached, and ratified by the Stokes Bay Railway and Pier Act 1858 (21 & 22 Vict. c. l) that gained royal assent on 28 June, that the SBRP would make the line, and construct the pier with a covered station; the LSWR would work the line, provided that Isle of Wight Ferry Company (IWFC) passengers used Stokes Bay pier exclusively. The LSWR guaranteed equal fares from London to Portsmouth or Gosport, with IWFC steamer charges not to exceed one-twelfth of those fares. The LSWR would retain SBRP fares and pier tolls, but tolls from non-railway passengers and goods would go to the SBRP. The agreement provided for suspension of the LSWR payment for working the railway if the ferry were prevented from working by bad weather, or other cause.

A tender for the construction from a contractor called Lucas, priced at £28,600, was accepted, but in post-tender negotiation there was a failure to come to terms and Lucas did not continue. The established contractors, Thomas Brassey and Alex Ogilvie, now appeared on the scene, and agreed to construct the line, taking shares in full payment.

At this stage the LSWR insisted on the Stokes Bay station being long enough to accommodate seven-coach trains, and the Stokes Bay Railway and Pier Company had to arrange for its contractor to construct the necessary lengthening, which included piling in the sea. The value of the work was £1,350 but there was some mismanagement about the formality of the variation order. This led to a dispute and ill feeling between the contractor and the SBRP Company. This resulted in an awkward misunderstanding: Captain Tyler of the Board of Trade was visiting for an inspection on 5 January 1859, in order to approve the line for passenger operation. Realising that matters were still unfinished at Stokes Bay, the SBRP tried to intercept him and cancel the visit, but could not reach him. Meanwhile to press their point of view, the contractor had removed a rail, preventing railway access to the line.

Tyler completed part of the inspection on foot, and commented that:

There are several viaducts constructed with cast iron girders upon timber supports – I was unable to test these or the pier in Stokes Bay, because the agent for the contractors declined to allow an engine to come upon the line. I observe that a raised stage is required at the junction with the South Western line near Gosport; that there are certain level crossings of what appear to me to be public roads which have not been authorised by Parliament; and that the terminal station at the pier is not quite completed… I have therefore to report my opinion that the line cannot be opened by reason of the incompleteness of the works, without danger to the public using it.

It was not only government officials who observed the mismanagement of the situation. On 28 February 1856, the Isle of Wight Ferry Company had attempted to make an inaugural trip, calling at the pier. The SBRP directors were present at Stokes Bay intending to participate in a ceremony. Brassey’s men prevented the directors from approaching the pier, and also prevented the ferryboat from berthing there. The contemporary newspaper report stated that

This unexpected contretemps is attributable to the disagreement which still exists between the directors of the company and the contractors, who refuse to permit the line or pier to be used, until certain claims have been satisfied.

In fact the SBRP had long since run out of cash, and still owed money in connection with land acquisition. The dispute was resolved by Brassey and Ogilvie providing the money themselves, and taking a charge in the line as security. A re-inspection by Tyler took place on 30 March 1863; this time he was satisfied subject to strengthening to the girders on the pier.

=== Opening of the line ===
Some accord was finally reached, and on Monday 6 April, the line opened to traffic without, it is reported, any kind of ceremony. The first train conveying through carriages to Stokes Bay left Waterloo at 08:00, and arrived at Stokes Bay at 10:55; a reversal at Gosport was necessary as it was not yet possible to run direct to the Stokes Bay line. (Note: That is to say, the junction with the Gosport line faced Gosport itself.) The crossing to Ryde with the steamer Garloch took 15 minutes.

Public services began with five trains each way on weekdays and two on Sundays, the trains being operated by the LSWR. Five daily ferry sailings made connections, with three on Sundays. For a few weeks a ferry crossing to Cowes also operated. However for some time London passengers had to change trains at Bishopstoke, and the journey showed little advantage compared with the existing route through Portsmouth. From August 1863 the Sunday service was suspended.

The board of the Stokes Bay Company approached the LSWR, requesting improvements, in particular avoiding protracted delays at Bishopstoke waiting for connecting trains. A pooling arrangement for Isle of Wight traffic had just been concluded with the London Brighton and South Coast Railway after a prolonged period of mutual hostility and obstruction, and satisfying the demands of the Stokes Bay company, which might disturb the hard-won peace with the Brighton company, was low in the LSWR priorities.

=== The need for improvements ===
The Stokes Bay company seem to have been demanding improved pier accommodation, faster trains between Stokes Bay and London as well as direct trains from Stokes Bay to Havant and early completion of a new pier at Ryde. The LSWR made courteous acknowledgements and undertook to examine the matter. In fact in 1865 a new spur connection was made, enabling trains to run direct to Stokes Bay from the Bishopstoke direction. It was brought into use on 1 June 1865, and was double track. Two trains each way daily used it, saving fifteen minutes compared with going via Gosport and reversing. Also on 1 June 1865 a station was opened on the branch, named Stoke Road or later Gosport Road; its purpose was to provide a service to Gosport on the Stokes Bay direct trains.

The supposed advantage of the Stokes Bay route to the Isle of Wight, was that direct transfer from train to ship was possible, in comparison to getting through the streets of Portsmouth. The advantage was diminished by the unreliability of the IWFC operation; the Stokes Bay pier was still unfinished and could not handle horses and carriages, nor properly take goods. The pier at Stokes Bay was rather exposed, and the steamers had difficulty in berthing there during times of high winds.

On 27 February 1865 the Isle of Wight Ferry Company ceased operation, and the Stokes Bay company had to ask the Portsmouth and Ryde Steam Packet Company to provide a ferry service, without which the Stokes Bay branch was useless.

In later years it became practice to attach the coach from Stokes Bay to a train from Portsmouth at Fareham. The best overall time from Ryde to Waterloo was three minutes under three hours.

=== Absorption by the LSWR ===
In 1871 the LSWR offered to purchase the Stokes Bay Railway and Pier Company in exchange for £35,000 of ordinary South Western stock. The little company managed to negotiate £40,000 which was agreed. The transfer was effective on 1 January 1872.

Completion of the transfer took place on 17 June 1875, delayed because of the complication of finalising ownership of some War Department land. The ordinary Stokes Bay shareholders got 20% of their subscription back. Total expenditure on the line since 1855 had been something over £76,000 against total receipts of just £21,724 accrued from the time of opening.

The opening of Portsmouth Harbour railway station in 1876 started a long decline in the usage of the Stokes Bay route, as it was now possible to transfer directly from train to steamer at Portsmouth; the railway route had been much shorter since the Portsmouth Direct line was opened in 1859.

Stokes Bay Pier was rebuilt in 1896 at a cost of more than £6,000 and in 1898 the two viaducts were replaced by single span bridges and embankments.

As the railway staff at Stokes Bay were unable to find suitable housing locally, in May 1899 the LSWR built a row of five cottages for £1,235.

=== The twentieth century ===
During the winter half of the year, from 1902 the steamer service was suspended from 1 October.

One of the greatest events on the branch was on 16 August 1902 the day of a naval review to mark the coronation of King Edward VII. Stokes Bay was one of the best vantage points on land to see the vessels. The LSWR charged 5s. for admission to the pier, (Note: Five shillings was worth about £25 in today’s money (2022).) but reduced it to 1s for the evening illuminations and fireworks. An augmented service of thirty-two trains ran between Fareham and Stokes Bay; Gosport station was closed for much of the day and used for stabling empty stock awaiting return. Between 22:00 and midnight Stokes Bay despatched trains every few minutes, including two return specials to Waterloo and through trains to Salisbury and Woking.

In the winter of 1902 – 1903, and probably in subsequent winters, the Isle of Wight ferry service from Stokes Bay was suspended due to lack of patronage.

From 1911 a through GWR coach ran from Reading to Stokes Bay. Steamers were not provided in the 1914 summer timetable and from 1 November 1915 Stokes Bay and Gosport Road stations closed.

== Closure, and afterwards ==
The line continued to decline and was eventually closed to passengers on 1 November 1915, when, with the First World War in progress, the Admiralty requisitioned the pier and station. During the war the line was used to convey military goods, sometimes at the rate of one train daily and primarily of munitions or fuel for the bowsers established on the former promenade.

In 1922 the Admiralty purchased the pier for £25,000; the acquisition included the railway up to a point a little south of Gosport Road station. For a time the line was used for stock storage, but by the late 1930s the railway track had been lifted. At the time both lines of rails leading to the pier were intact. Its new use was to be as a torpedo station and degaussing range; rail access was no longer required.

The former triangle at Gosport was retained for engine turning; the points at the south end were hand-operated, Stokes Bay Junction signal-box having closed from 30 November 1924. The stub to Gosport Road was now used for stock storage. At one time there was reputedly some forty Great Western Railway Open-A vehicles stabled there. The reason for this was due to the GWR Impounding Southern Railway (Note: The Southern Railway had been formed in 1923 by the process known as the "Grouping" of the railways, following the Railways Act 1921.) cattle wagons for their own use whereupon the Southern refused to return various GWR vehicles until their own stock was returned.

The track, except on the pier, had been removed by 1936.

== Locations ==
=== Gosport to Stoke Bay ===
- Gosport Junction; on Gosport main line nearest Gosport;
- Stokes Bay Junction; at south apex of triangle;
- Stoke Road; opened 1 June 1865; renamed Gosport Road 8 November 1866; renamed Gosport Road and Alverstoke 8 November 1866; closed 1 November 1915;
- Stokes Bay; opened 6 April 1863; closed 1 November 1915.

=== West curve ===
- Forton Junction; opened 1 June 1865
- Stokes Bay Junction.
