= List of closed railway stations in Great Britain: D–F =

The list of closed railway stations in Great Britain includes the following: Year of closure is given if known. Stations reopened as heritage railways continue to be included in this list and some have been linked. Some stations have been reopened to passenger traffic. Some lines remain in use for freight and mineral traffic.

== D ==
=== Da ===
Station (Town, unless in station name)	Rail company	Year closed	Notes
Dacre	NER	1951	
Daggons Road	L&SWR	1964	
Dailly	G&SWR	1965	
Dailuiane Halt	L&NER	1965	
Daimler Halt	L&NWR	1965	
Dairsie	NBR	1954	
Dairy House	Blyth and Tyne Railway	1862	
Daisy Bank and Bradley	GWR	1962	
Daisyfield	L&YR	1958	
Dalbeattie	G&SWR	1965	
Dalchonzie Halt	Caledonian	1951	
Dalcross	Highland Railway	1965	
Dale Bank	Ashover Light Railway	1936	
Dalegarth (Cottages)	Ravenglass and Eskdale Railway	1926	
Dalguise	Highland	1965	
Dalhousie	NBR	1908	
Dalkeith	NBR	1942	
Dallam Lane (Warrington)	Warrington and Newton Railway	1837	
Dalmellington	G&SWR	1964	
Dalmuir Riverside	Caledonian Railway	1964	
Dalnaspidal	Highland Railway	1965	
Dalry Junction	G&SWR	1860	
Dalry Road	Caledonian Railway	1962	
Dalrymple	G&SWR	1954	
Dalserf	Caledonian Railway	1951	
Dalston Junction	North London Railway	1986	reopened 2010
Dalston Kingsland	North London Railway	1865	reopened 1983
Dalvey	GNSR	1858	
Dalvey Farm Halt	British Railways	1965	
Danby Wiske	NER	1958	
Dandaleith	GNSR	1962	
Danygraig Halt	GWR	1936	
Darby End Halt	GWR	1964	
Darcy Lever	Lancashire and Yorkshire Railway	1951	
Daresbury	Birkenhead Joint Railway	1952	
Darfield	MR	1963	
Darlaston	L&NWR	1887	
Darlaston James Bridge	L&NWR	1965 reopened 2026	
Darley	NER	1951	
Darley Dale	MR	1967	
Darran and Deri	Rhymney Railway	1962	
Darras Hall	NER	1929	
Darvel	G&SWR	1964	
Daubhill	Bolton and Leigh Railway	1885	
Dauntsey	GWR	1965	
Dava	Highland Railway	1965	
Daventry	L&NWR	1958	
Davidson's Mains	Caledonian Railway	1951	
Davies Dyke	Wilsontown, Morningside and Coltness Railway	1848	
Daviot	Highland Railway	1965	
Dawley and Stirchley	L&NWR	1952	
Dawsholm	Caledonian Railway	1908	
Daybrook	GNR	1960	

=== De ===
Station (Town, unless in station name)	Rail company	Year closed	Notes
Deadwater	North British Railway	1956	
Deanside	Glasgow and Renfrew District Railway	1905	
Dearham	Maryport and Carlisle Railway	1935	
Dearham Bridge	Maryport and Carlisle Railway	1950	
Dechmont	NBR	1921	
Dechmont	Edinburgh and Glasgow Railway	1861	
Dee Street Halt	British Railways	1966	
Deepcar	Sheffield, Ashton-under-Lyne and Manchester Railway	1959	
Deepdale	Fleetwood, Preston and West Riding Junction Railway	1930	
Deepdale Street	Preston and Longridge Railway	1856	
Deepfields and Coseley	LNWR	1902	
Deeside Halt	Llangollen Railway	2022	
Defford	MR	1965	
Defiance Platform	GWR	1930	
Deighton	L&NWR	1930	
Delabole	L&SWR	1966	
Delny	Highland Railway	1960	
Delph	L&NWR	1955	
Denaby and Conisbrough	Hull and Barnsley Railway	1903	
Denaby Halt	Dearne Valley Railway	1949	
Denbigh	L&NWR	1962	
Denbigh Hall	London and Birmingham Railway	1838	
Denby	MR	1930	
Denhead	Dundee and Arbroath Railway	1929	
Denholme	GNR	1955	
Denny	Caledonian Railway	1930	
Dennyloanhead	Kilsyth and Bonnybridge Railway	1935	
Denstone	North Staffordshire Railway	1965	
Dent	MR	1970	reopened 1986
Denton Halt	SE&CR	1961	
Denver	GER	1930	
Derby Derwent Bridge	Midland Counties Railway	1892	
Derby Friargate	Great Northern Railway	1964	
Derby London Road	Midland Railway	1900	
Derby Nottingham Road	Midland Railway	1967	
Derby Racecourse	Great Northern Railway	1938	approximate date
Dereham	East Anglian Railways	1850	
Dereham	GER	1969	reopened 1997
Derry Ormond	GWR	1965	
Dersingham	GER	1969	
Derwen	London and North Western Railway	1864	
Derwent Bridge (Derby)	Midland Counties Railway	1892	
Derwenthaugh	Newcastle and Carlisle Railway	1868	
Derwydd Road	GWR	1954	
Desborough and Rothwell	MR	1968	
Desford (1st)	MR	1848	
Desford (2nd)	MR	1964	
Dess	GNoSR	1966	
Detton Ford Siding	Cleobury Mortimer and Ditton Priors Light Railway	1938	
Devizes	WSWR and GWR	1966	
Devonport Kings Road	LSWR	1964	
Devonshire Street	Eastern Counties Railway	1840	
Devynock and Sennybridge	Neath and Brecon Railway	1962	
Dewsbury Central	GNR	1964	
Dewsbury Market Place	Lancashire and Yorkshire Railway	1930	

=== Di ===
Station (Town, unless in station name)	Rail company	Year closed	Notes
Dicconson Lane and Aspull	L&YR	1954	
Didsbury	MR	1967	
Digby	Great Northern and Great Eastern Joint Railway	1961	
Diggle	L&NWR	1968	
Dillwyn and Brynteg Halt	Neath and Brecon Railway	1962	
Dinas	Ffestiniog Railway	1870	
Dinas Junction	L&NWR	1951	new station for Welsh Highland Rly opened 1997
Dinas Junction	NWNGR/WHR	1936	new station opened 1997
Dinas Mawddwy	Mawddwy Railway	1931	
Dingestow	GWR	1955	
Dingle	Liverpool Overhead Railway	1956	
Dinmore	Shrewsbury and Hereford Railway	1958	
Dinnet	GNoSR	1966	
Dinnington and Laughton	South Yorkshire Joint Railway	1929	
Dinton	L&SWR	1966	
Dinwoodie	Caledonian Railway	1960	
Diphwys	Festiniog and Blaenau Railway	1883	
Dirleton	NBR	1954	
Distington	Cleator and Workington Junction Railway/Whitehaven, Cleator and Egremont Railway	1931	
Ditcham Park (or Woodcroft) Halt	Southern Railway	1945	
Ditchford	L&NWR	1924	
Ditchingham	GER	1953	
Ditton	L&NWR	1994	
Ditton Priors	Cleobury Mortimer and Ditton Priors Light Railway	1938	
Dixon Fold	L&YR	1931	
Dixter Halt	KESR	1983	

=== Do ===
Station (Town, unless in station name)	Rail company	Year closed	Notes
Dobcross	L&NWR	1955	
Docking	GER	1952	
Dodderhill	Birmingham and Gloucester Railway	1844	
Doddington and Harby	LD&ECR	1955	
Dodworth	Manchester, Sheffield and Lincolnshire Railway	1959	reopened 1989
Doe Hill	MR	1960	
Dog Lane	Manchester, Sheffield and Lincolnshire Railway	1847	
Dogdyke	GNR	1963	
Dolarddyn Crossing	Cambrian Railways	1931	
Dolcoath Halt	GWR	1908	
Doldderwen Crossing	Corris Railway	1931	
Doldowlod	Cambrian Railways	1962	
Dolgellau	GWR	1965	
Dollar	NBR	1964	
Dolphinton	Caledonian Railway	1945	
Dolphinton	NBR	1933	
Dolserau Halt	GWR	1951	
Dolwen	Cambrian Railways	1962	
Dolygaer	Brecon and Merthyr Railway	1962	
Dolyhir	GWR	1951	
Dolywern	Glyn Valley Tramway	1933	
Don Street (Aberdeen)	GNoSR	1937	
Doncaster (Cherry Tree Lane)	South Yorkshire Railway	1852	
Doncaster (St.James' Bridge)	London and North Eastern Railway	1946	approximate date
Donibristle Halt	London and North Eastern Railway	1959	
Donington Road	Great Northern and Great Eastern Joint Railway	1961	
Donington-on-Bain	GNR	1951	
Donisthorpe	Ashby and Nuneaton Railway	1931	
Donnington	L&NWR	1964	
Donyatt Halt	GWR	1962	
Dornoch	Highland Railway	1960	
Dorrington	Shrewsbury and Hereford Railway	1958	
Dorstone	Golden Valley Railway	1941	
Dorton Halt	GWR	1963	
Doseley Halt	GWR	1962	
Doublebois	GWR	1964	
Douglas West	Caledonian Railway	1964	
Doune	Caledonian Railway	1965	
Dousland	GWR	1956	
Dove Bank, Uttoxeter	North Staffordshire Railway	1881	
Dovecliffe	South Yorkshire Railway	1953	
Dovenby Lodge	Maryport & Carlisle Railway	1935	
Dover Admiralty Pier	South Eastern Railway	1914	
Dover Harbour	London, Chatham and Dover Railway	1927	
Dover Town	South Eastern Railway	1914	
Dover Marine (later renamed "Dover Western Docks")	SECR	1994	
Dowlais Cae Harris	Rhymney Railway	1964	
Dowlais Central	Brecon and Merthyr Railway	1960	
Dowlais (High Street)	LNWR	1958	
Dowlais Top	LNWR	1885	
Dowlais Top	Brecon and Merthyr Railway	1962	
Dowlow Halt	LNWR	1954	
Down Street	Great Northern, Piccadilly and Brompton Railway	1932	
Downfield Crossing Halt	GWR	1964	
Downholland	Lancashire and Yorkshire Railway	1938	
Downton	L&SWR	1964	

=== Dr ===
Station (Town, unless in station name)	Rail company	Year closed	Notes
Drax Abbey	Hull and Barnsley Railway	1932	
Drax Hales	NER	1964	
Draycott (Somerset)	GWR (Cheddar Valley Railway)	1963	
Draycott and Breaston (Derbyshire)	MR	1966	
Drayton (Norfolk)	Midland and Great Northern Joint Railway	1959	
Drayton (West Sussex)	LBSCR	1930	
Dreghorn	Glasgow and South Western Railway	1964	
Drighlington and Adwalton	GNR	1962	
Droitwich Road	MR	1855	
Drongan	G&SWR	1951	
Dronley	Caledonian Railway	1955	
Droxford	LSWR	1955	
Droylsden (or "Droylesden")	L&YR	1968	
Drum	Great North of Scotland Railway	1951	
Drumburgh	North British Railway	1955	
Drumclog	Caledonian Railway	1939	
Drumgelloch (old station)	British Rail	2010	
Drumlemble Halt	Campbeltown and Machrihanish Light Railway	1932	
Drumlithie	Caledonian Railway	1956	
Drummuir	Great North of Scotland Railway	1968	
Drumpark	LMS	1964	
Drumshoreland	North British Railway	1951	
Drws-y-Nant	GWR	1965	
Drybridge	G&SWR	1969	
Drybridge Platform	Highland Railway	1915	
Drybrook Halt	GWR	1930	
Drybrook Road	Severn and Wye Railway	1929	
Drymen	North British Railway	1934	
Dryslwyn	LNWR	1963	

=== Du ===
Station (Town, unless in station name)	Rail company	Year closed	Notes
Dubton	Caledonian Railway	1952	
Ducie Bridge	Lancashire and Yorkshire Railway	1884	
Dudbridge	Midland Railway	1947	
Dudding Hill	Midland Railway	1902	
Duddingston and Craigmillar	North British Railway	1962	
Dudley	GWR	1964	
Dudley Hill	GNR	1952	
Dudley Port Low Level	LNWR	1964	
Duffield Gate	NER	1890	
Duffryn Crossing Halt	GWR	1917	
Duffryn Rhondda Halt	Rhondda and Swansea Bay Railway	1962	
Dufftown	GNoSR	1968 reopened 2005	
Duffws	Festiniog and Blaenau Railway	1883	
Duffws	Festiniog Railway	1931	
Dukeries Junction	GNR	1950	
Dukinfield and Ashton	LNWR	1950	
Dukinfield Central	GCR	1959	
Dukinfield Dog Lane	Manchester, Sheffield and Lincolnshire Railway	1847	
Dullatur	North British Railway	1967	
Dulverton	GWR	1966	
Dumfries House	GSWR	1949	
Dumgoyne	North British Railway	1951	
Dunball Halt	GWR	1964	
Dunchurch	LNWR	1959	
Dundee East	Dundee and Arbroath Railway	1959	
Dundee Esplanade	North British Railway	1939	
Dundee Trades Lane	Dundee and Arbroath Railway	1857	
Dundee Ward Road	Dundee and Newtyle Railway	1861	
Dundee West	Caledonian Railway	1965	
Dunfermline Upper	North British Railway	1968	
Dunford Bridge	Sheffield, Ashton-Under-Lyne and Manchester Railway	1970	
Dungeness	SER	1937	
Dunham (Cheshire)	Warrington and Stockport Railway	1855	
Dunham (Norfolk)	GER	1968	
Dunham Hill	Birkenhead Railway	1952	
Dunham Massey	LNWR	1962	
Dunhampstead	Midland Railway	1855	
Dunkerton	GWR	1925	
Dunkerton Colliery Halt	GWR	1925	
Dunmere Halt	LSWR	1967	
Dunmow	GER	1952	
Dunnerholme Gate	Whitehaven and Furness Junction Railway	?	Mentioned in volume 14 of the Regional History of the Railways of Great Britain but no contemporary records
Dunning	Caledonian Railway	1956	
Dunnington for Kexby	Derwent Valley Light Railway	1926	
Dunnington Halt	Derwent Valley Light Railway	1926	
Dunphail	Highland Railway	1965	
Dunragit	Portpatrick and Wigtownshire Joint Railway	1965	
Duns	North British Railway	1951	
Dunsbear Halt	SR	1965	
Dunscore	GSWR	1943	
Dunsford Halt	GWR	1958	
Dunsland Cross	LSWR	1966	
Dunstable North	L&NWR	1965	
Dunstable Town	GNR	1965	
Dunstall Park	GWR	1968	
Dunston-on-Tyne	NER	1926	reopened 1984
Dunsyre	Caledonian Railway	1945	
Dunure	G&SWR	1930	
Dunvant	L&NWR	1964	
Durham Elvet	North Eastern Railway	1931	
Durham Gilesgate	North Eastern Railway	1857	
Durham Turnpike	North Eastern Railway	1869	
Durley Halt	L&SWR	1933	
Duror	Caledonian	1966	
Dursley	MR	1962	
Durston	Bristol and Exeter Railway	1964	

=== Dy ===
Station (Town, unless in station name)	Rail company	Year closed	Notes
Dymock	GWR	1959	
Dynea Halt	Alexandra (Newport and South Wales) Docks and Railway	1956	
Dysart	NBR	1969	
Dyserth	L&NWR	1930	

== E ==
=== Ea – Eg ===
Station (Town, unless in station name)	Rail company	Year closed	Notes
Earby	MR	1970	
Eardington Halt (1st)	GWR	1963	reopened in preservation 1970
Eardington Halt (2nd)	Severn Valley Railway	1982	
Eardisley	MR	1962	
Earith Bridge	GER	1931	
Earls Colne	Colne Valley and Halstead Railway	1962	
Earlsheaton	GNR	1953	
Earlston	NBR	1948	
Earlyvale Gate	Peebles Railway	1857	
Earsham	GER	1953	
Earswick	York and North Midland Railway	1965	
Easington	NER	1964	
Easingwold	Easingwold Railway	1948	
Eassie	Newtyle, Eassie and Glamiss Railway	1956	
East Anstey	GWR	1966	
East Barkwith	GNR	1951	
East Brixton	LB&SCR	1976	
East Budleigh	L&SWR	1967	
East Fortune	North British Railway	1964	
East Garston	GWR	1960	
East Grange	NBR	1958	
East Halton Halt	GCR	1963	
East Langton	MR	1968	
East Leake	GCR	1969	
East Linton	NBR	1964	New station opened in different site in 2023
East Minster	Sheppey Light Railway	1950	
East Norton	GNR/L&NWR Joint Railway	1953	
East Pilton	LM&SR	1962	
East Rudham	M&GNJR	1959	
East Southsea	L&SWR/LB&SCR Joint Railway	1914	
East Street (Bridport)	GWR	1930	
East Ville	GNR	1961	
East Winch	GER	1968	
Eastbank Street (Southport)	Liverpool, Crosby and Southport Railway	1851	
Eastbury Halt	GWR	1960	
Eastchurch	Sheppey Light Railway	1950	
Eastern Entrance to Immingham Dock	Grimsby and Immingham Tramway	1920	
Easter Road	NBR	1947	
Easter Road Park Halt	British Railways	1967	
Eastgate	NER	1953	
Easthaven	Dundee and Arbroath Railway	1967	
Easthope Halt	GWR	1951	
Eastoft	Isle of Axholme Joint Railway	1933	
Easton	GWR/L&SWR Joint Railway	1952	
Easton Court	Tenbury & Bewdley Railway	1961	
Easton Lodge	GER	1952	
Eastrea	GER	1866	
Eastriggs	G&SWR	1965	
Eastry	East Kent Light Railway	1948	
Eastry South	East Kent Light Railway	1948	
Eastwood	Lancashire and Yorkshire Railway	1951	
Eastwood and Langley Mill	GNR	1963	
Eaton	Bishop's Castle Railway	1935	
Ebberston	NER	1950	
Ebbsfleet and Cliffsend Halt	SE&CR	1933	
Ebbw Vale (High Level)	L&NWR	1951	
Ebbw Vale (Low Level)	GWR	1962	
Ebchester	NER	1953	
Ebdon Lane	Weston, Clevedon and Portishead Railway	1940	
Ebley Crossing Halt	GWR	1964	
Ecclefechan	Caledonian	1960	
Ecclesfield East (1st)	South Yorkshire Railway	1856	
Ecclesfield East (2nd)	South Yorkshire Railway	1953	
Ecclesfield West	MR	1967	
Eccleshill	GNR	1931	
Eckington	Birmingham and Gloucester Railway	1965	
Eckington and Renishaw	MR	1951	
Ecton	North Staffordshire Railway	1934	
Edderton	Highland Railway	1960	
Eddleston	NBR	1962	
Edenham	Edenham and Little Bytham Railway	1871	
Edge Lane	L&NWR	1948	
Edgebold	Potteries, Shrewsbury and North Wales Railway/Shropshire and Montgomeryshire Railway	1933	
Edgerley Halt	Potteries, Shrewsbury and North Wales Railway/Shropshire and Montgomeryshire Railway	1933	
Edgware	GNR	1939	
Edinburgh Canal Street	North British Railway	1868	
Edinburgh Princes Street (NBR)	North British Railway	1868	
Edinburgh Princes Street	Caledonian Railway	1965	
Edinburgh St Leonards	Edinburgh and Dalkeith Railway	1860	
Edinburgh Scotland Street	North British Railway	1868	
Edington and Bratton	GWR	1952	
Edington Burtle	Somerset and Dorset Joint Railway	1966	
Edlingham	NER	1930	
Edlington	Dearne Valley Railway	1951	
Edmondthorpe and Wymondham	MR	1959	
Edrom	NBR	1951	
Edwalton	MR	1941	
Edwinstowe	LD&ECR	1955	
Edzell	Caledonian	1938	
Efail Isaf	Barry Railway	1962	
Egginton	North Staffordshire Railway	1878	
Egginton Junction	GNR/North Staffs Joint Railway	1962	
Eglinton Street (Glasgow)	Caledonian Railway	1965	
Egloskerry	L&SWR	1966	
Egremont	Whitehaven, Cleator and Egremont Railway	1947	special services ran until 1969

=== El – Er ===
Station (Town, unless in station name)	Rail company	Year closed	Notes
Elburton Cross	GWR	1947	
Elderslie	G&SWR	1966	
Elford	MR	1952	
Elgin East	GNSR	1968	
Elham	SER	1940	
Elie	NBR	1965	
Elland	Lancashire and Yorkshire Railway	1962	
Ellenbrook	L&NWR	1961	
Ellerby (1st)	Hull and Hornsea Railway	1902	reopened as Marton
Ellerby (2nd)	Hull and Hornsea Railway	1964	opened as Marton; renamed Burton Constable
Ellerdine Halt	GWR	1963	
Ellesmere	Cambrian Railways	1965	
Ellingham	GER	1953	
Elliot Junction	Dundee and Arbroath Railway	1967	
Ellon	GNoSR	1965	
Elmbridge	GER	1928	
Elmesthorpe	L&NWR	1968	
Elmore Halt	L&SWR	1930	
Elms Bridge Halt	GWR	1955	
Elmton and Creswell	MR	1964	
Elrington Halt	NER	1930	
Elsham	Great Central Railway	1993	
Elslack	MR	1952	
Elson Halt	GWR	1962	
Elsted	L&SWR	1955	
Elswick	NER	1967	
Eltham Park	SE&CR	1985	
Eltham Well Hall	SER	1985	
Elton	L&NWR	1953	
Elvanfoot	Caledonian Railway	1965	
Elvington (Kent)	East Kent Railway	1948	
Elvington (North Yorkshire)	Derwent Valley Light Railway	1926	
Ely Main Line	GWR	1962	
Embleton	Cockermouth, Keswick and Penrith Railway	1958	
Embo	Highland Railway	1960	
Embsay	Midland Railway	1965	reopened 1981
Emneth	GER	1968	
Endon	North Staffordshire Railway	1956	
Enfield	Great Northern Railway	1910	
English Bridge	GWR/L&NWR Joint Railway	1898	
Enthorpe	NER	1954	
Enzie	Highland Railway	1915	
Epsom Town	LB&SCR	1929	
Epworth	Isle of Axholme Joint Railway	1933	
Errol	North British Railway	1985	
Erwood	Cambrian Railways	1962	
Eryholme	NER	1911	

=== Es – Ey ===
Station (Town, unless in station name)	Rail company	Year closed	Notes
Escrick	NER	1953	
Esgairgeiliog (or Escairgeiliog)	Corris Railway	1931	
Esholt	MR	1940	
Eskbank and Dalkeith	NBR	1969	
Esk Bridge	NBR	1930	
Eskett	Whitehaven, Cleator and Egremont Junction Railway	1872	
Eskmeals	Furness Railway	1959	
Essendine	GNR	1959	
Esslemont	GNSR	1952	
Eston	NER	1929	
Etherley	NER	1965	
Etruria	North Staffordshire Railway	2005	
Ettingshall Road and Bilston	L&NWR	1964	
Ettington	East and West Junction Railway	1952	
Etwall	GNR	1939	
Euston Road (Morecambe)	L&NWR	1958	
Euxton (L&NW)	L&NWR	1895	
Euxton (L&Y)	L&YR	1917	
Evanton	Highland Railway	1960	
Evenwood	NER	1957	
Evercreech Junction	Somerset and Dorset Joint Railway	1966	
Evercreech New	Somerset and Dorset Joint Railway	1966	
Everingham	NER	1954	
Evershot	GWR	1966	
Evesham (Midland)	MR	1963	
Evesham Road Crossing Halt	GWR	1916	
Ewesley	NBR	1952	
Ewood Bridge and Edenfield	L&YR	1972	
Exminster	GWR	1964	
Exning Road Halt	GER	1962	
Eyarth	L&NWR	1953	
Eydon Road Halt	GCR	1956	
Eye	GER	1931	
Eye Green	Midland and Great Northern Joint Railway	1957	
Eyemouth	NBR	1962	
Eynsham	GWR	1962	
Eythorne	East Kent Light Railway	1948	reopened 1993

== F ==
=== Fa ===
Station (Town, unless in station name)	Rail company	Year closed	Notes
Facit	L&YR	1947	
Fairfield Halt	L&NWR	1939	
Fairfield Siding	NBR	1866	
Fairford	GWR	1962	
Fairlie Pier	G&SWR	1972	
Fakenham East	GER	1964	
Fakenham West	M&GNJR	1959	
Falkirk Camelon	Edinburgh and Glasgow Railway	1967	new station opened 1994
Falkland Road	NBR	1958	
Fallgate	Ashover Light Railway	1936	
Fallodon	North Eastern Railway	1934	
Fallowfield	GCR	1958	
Falls of Cruachan	Caledonian Railway	1965	reopened 1988
Fallside	Caledonian Railway	1953	
Falstone	NBR	1956	
Fangfoss	York and North Midland Railway	1959	
Faringdon (Oxfordshire)	GWR	1951	
Farington (Lancashire)	North Union Railway	1960	
Farley Halt	GWR	1962	
Farlington Halt	LB&SCR	1937	
Farnell Road	Caledonian Railway	1956	
Farnley and Wortley	LNWR	1952	
Farnsfield	Midland Railway	1929	
Farnworth and Bold	LNWR	1951	
Farringdon Halt (Hampshire)	Southern Railway	1955	
Farrington Gurney	GWR	1959	
Farthinghoe	LNWR	1952	
Faslane Platform	LM&SR	1940s	
Fauldhouse and Crofthead	Wilsontown, Morningside and Coltness Railway	1930	
Fawcett Street (Sunderland)	NER	1879	
Fawley (Hampshire)	Southern Railway	1966	
Fawley (Herefordshire)	GWR	1964	

=== Fe ===
Station (Town, unless in station name)	Rail company	Year closed	Notes
Featherstone	Lancashire and Yorkshire Railway	1967	reopened 1992
Featherstone Park	NER	1976	
Feering Halt	LNER	1951	
Felin Fach	GWR	1951	
Felin Fran Halt	GWR	1956	
Felin Hen Halt	LNWR	1951	
Felindyffryn Halt	GWR	1964	
Felixstowe Beach	GER	1967	
Felixstowe Pier	GER	1951	
Felmingham	Midland and Great Northern Joint Railway	1959	
Felsted	GER	1952	
Fen Ditton Halt	GER	1962	
Fenay Bridge and Lepton	LNWR	1930	
Fencehouses	NER	1964	
Fencote	GWR	1952	
Feniscowles	Lancashire and Yorkshire Railway & Lancashire Union Railway joint	1960	
Fennant Road Halt	GWR	1915	
Fenn's Bank	Cambrian Railways	1965	
Fenny Compton	GWR	1964	
Fenny Compton West	East and West Junction Railway	1952	
Fenton	North Staffordshire Railway	1961	
Fenton Manor	North Staffordshire Railway	1956	
Ferndale	Taff Vale Railway	1964	
Fernhill Heath	GWR	1965	
Ferniegair	Caledonian Railway	1917	reopened 2005 as Chatelherault
Ferry-(Cambridgeshire)	Midland and Great Northern Joint Railway	1959	
Ferry-(West Sussex)	West Sussex Railway	1935	
Ferrybridge	Swinton and Knottingley Joint Railway	1965	
Ferryhill (Aberdeen)	Aberdeen Railway	1854	
Ferryhill (Durham)	NER	1967	
Fersit Halt	LNER	1934	
Festiniog	GWR	1960	

=== Ff–Fl ===
Station (Town, unless in station name)	Rail company	Year closed	Notes
Ffridd Gate	Corris Railway	1931	
Ffrith	Wrexham and Mineral Joint Railway	1950	
Ffronfraith Halt	Cambrian Railways	1931	
Fidlers Ferry and Penketh	LNWR	1950	
Fighting Cocks	NER	1887	
Filey Holiday Camp	LNER	1977	
Filleigh	GWR	1966	
Filton Junction	GWR	1996	Station relocated to Filton Abbey Wood
Finchley Road (1st)	Midland Railway	1884	
Finchley Road (2nd)	Midland Railway	1927	
Findhorn	Highland Railway	1869	
Findochty	Great North of Scotland Railway	1968	
Finedon	Midland Railway	1940	
Fingask	Great North of Scotland Railway	1931	
Finghall Lane	NER	1954	reopened 2004
Finmere	Great Central Railway	1963	
Finnieston	North British Railway	1917	
Finningham	GER	1966	
Finningley	Great Northern and Great Eastern Joint Railway	1961	
Firsby	GNR	1970	
Fisherrow	North British Railway	1847	
Fishguard and Goodwick	GWR	1964	reopened 2012
Fishponds (Bristol)	Midland Railway	1966	
Fittleworth	LBSC	1955	
Five Mile House	GNR	1958	
Five Ways	Midland Railway	1944	reopened 1978
Fladbury	GWR	1966	
Flamborough	NER	1970	
Flax Bourton (1st)	Bristol and Exeter Railway	1893	
Flax Bourton (2nd)	Bristol and Exeter Railway	1963	
Flaxton	NER	1930	
Flecknoe	LNWR	1952	
Fledborough	LD&ECR	1955	
Fleet (Lincolnshire)	Midland and Great Northern Joint Railway	1959	
Fleetwood (1st)	Preston and Wyre Joint Railway	1883	
Fleetwood (2nd)	Preston and Wyre Joint Railway	1966	
Fleetwood (formerly Wyre Dock)	Preston and Wyre Joint Railway	1970	
Flemington	Caledonian Railway	1965	
Fleur-de-Lis Platform	GWR	1962	
Flordon	GER	1966	
Floriston	Caledonian Railway	1950	
Flow Moss	Liverpool and Manchester Railway	1842	
Flushdyke	GNR	1941	

=== Fo–Fy ===
Station (Town, unless in station name)	Rail company	Year closed	Notes
Fochabers Town	Highland Railway	1931	
Fochriw	Brecon and Merthyr Railway	1962	
Fockerby	Isle of Axholme Joint Railway	1933	
Foggathorpe	NER	1954	
Foleshill	LNWR	1965	
Foley Park Halt	GWR	1970	
Folkestone East	SER	1965	
Folkestone Harbour	SER	2009	
Folkestone Warren Halt	SER	1939	
Fontburn Halt	North British Railway	1952	
Ford (Devon)	LSWR	1964	
Ford (Merseyside)	Lancashire and Yorkshire Railway	1951	
Ford and Crossgates	Potteries, Shrewsbury and North Wales Railway	1933	
Ford Bridge	Shrewsbury and Hereford Railway	1954	
Ford Green & Smallthorne	North Staffordshire Railway	1927	
Ford Halt (Plymouth)	GWR	1941	
Forden	Cambrian Railways	1965	
Fordham	GER	1965	
Fordingbridge	LSWR	1964	
Fordoun	Caledonian Railway	1956	
Forest Hall	NER	1958	
Forest Hall	Blyth & Tyne Railway	1871	
Forest Mill	North British Railway	1930	
Forest Row	London, Brighton and South Coast Railway	1967	
Forfar Playfield	Arbroath and Forfar Railway	1848	
Forfar	Caledonian Railway	1967	
Forgandenny	Caledonian Railway	1956	
Forge Crossing Halt	GWR	1951	
Forge Valley	NER	1950	
Formby Power Station	Lancashire and Yorkshire Railway	1944	
Forncett	GER	1966	
Forrestfield	North British Railway	1930	
Fort Augustus	Highland Railway	1933	
Fort Augustus Pier	Highland Railway	1906	
Fort Brockhurst	LSWR	1953	
Fort George	Highland Railway	1943	
Fort Gomer Halt	LSWR	1930	
Forteviot	Caledonian Railway	1956	
Fortrose	Highland Railway	1951	
Foryd	LNWR	1885	
Foryd Pier	LNWR	1885	
Foss Cross	Midland and South Western Junction Railway	1961	
Fotherby Gate House	GNR	1872	
Fotherby Halt	GNR	1961	
Foulis	Highland Railway	1960	
Foulridge	Midland Railway	1959	
Foulsham	GER	1952	
Fountain Bridge Halt	Brecon and Merthyr Railway	1956	
Fountainhall	North British Railway	1969	
Four Ashes	Grand Junction Railway	1959	
Four Crosses	Cambrian Railways	1965	
Four Oaks Halt	GWR	1959	
Fourstones	NER	1967	
Fovant	Fovant Military Railway	1924	
Fowey	GWR	1965	
Foxdale (Isle of Man)	Foxdale Railway	1940	
Framlingham	GER	1952	
Frankton	Cambrian Railways	1965	
Fransham	GER	1968	
Fraserburgh	Great North of Scotland Railway	1965	
Free Street (Brecon)	Brecon and Merthyr Railway	1962	
Fremington	LSWR	1965	
French Drove and Gedney Hill	Great Northern and Great Eastern Joint Railway	1961	
Freshfield Halt	Bluebell Railway	1988	
Freshwater Isle of Wight	Freshwater, Yarmouth and Newport Railway	1953	
Friargate (Derby)	GNR	1964	
Friars Walk (Lewes)	London, Brighton and South Coast Railway	1857	
Frickley	Swinton and Knottingley Joint Railway	1953	
Friezland	LNWR	1917	
Friockheim	Caledonian Railway	1955	
Frisby	Midland Railway	1961	
Frittenden Road	Kent and East Sussex Light Railway	1954	
Fritwell & Somerton	GWR	1964	
Frizinghall	Midland Railway	1965	reopened 1987
Frizington	Whitehaven, Cleator and Egremont Junction Railway	1931	
Frocester	Midland Railway	1961	
Frodingham and Scunthorpe	Great Central Railway	1928	
Frongoch	GWR	1960	
Frosterley	NER	1953	
Fugar Bar	Brandling Junction Railway	1844	on or before this date
Fulbar Street (Renfrew)	Glasgow and South Western Railway	1967	
Fulbourn/Fulbourne	GER	1967	
Fullerton (1st)	LSWR	1885	
Fullerton (2nd)	LSWR	1964	
Fulwell and Westbury	LNWR	1961	
Furness Abbey	Furness Railway	1950	
Fushiebridge	North British Railway	1943	
Fyling Hall	NER	1965	
Fyvie	Great North of Scotland Railway	1951	
