= Ecclesfield railway station =

Ecclesfield railway station can mean:

- Ecclesfield East railway station, on the "Blackburn Valley" line of the South Yorkshire Railway, closed in 1954
- Ecclesfield West railway station, on the Midland Railway, closed in 1967
