= Lee-on-the-Solent railway station =

Disused railway station in Lee-on-the-Solent, Hampshire

Lee-on-the-Solent

General information
- Location: Lee-on-the-Solent, Hampshire; England
- Coordinates: 50.7995°N 1.2015°W
- Grid reference: SU563003
- Platforms: 1

Other information
- Status: Disused

History
- Original company: Lee-on-the-Solent Railway
- Pre-grouping: Lee-on-the-Solent Railway
- Post-grouping: Southern Railway

Key dates
- 12 May 1894: Opened
- 31 August 1914: Closed temporarily
- 1 October 1914: Reopened
- 1 January 1931: Closed to passengers
- 30 September 1935: Closed completely
Location

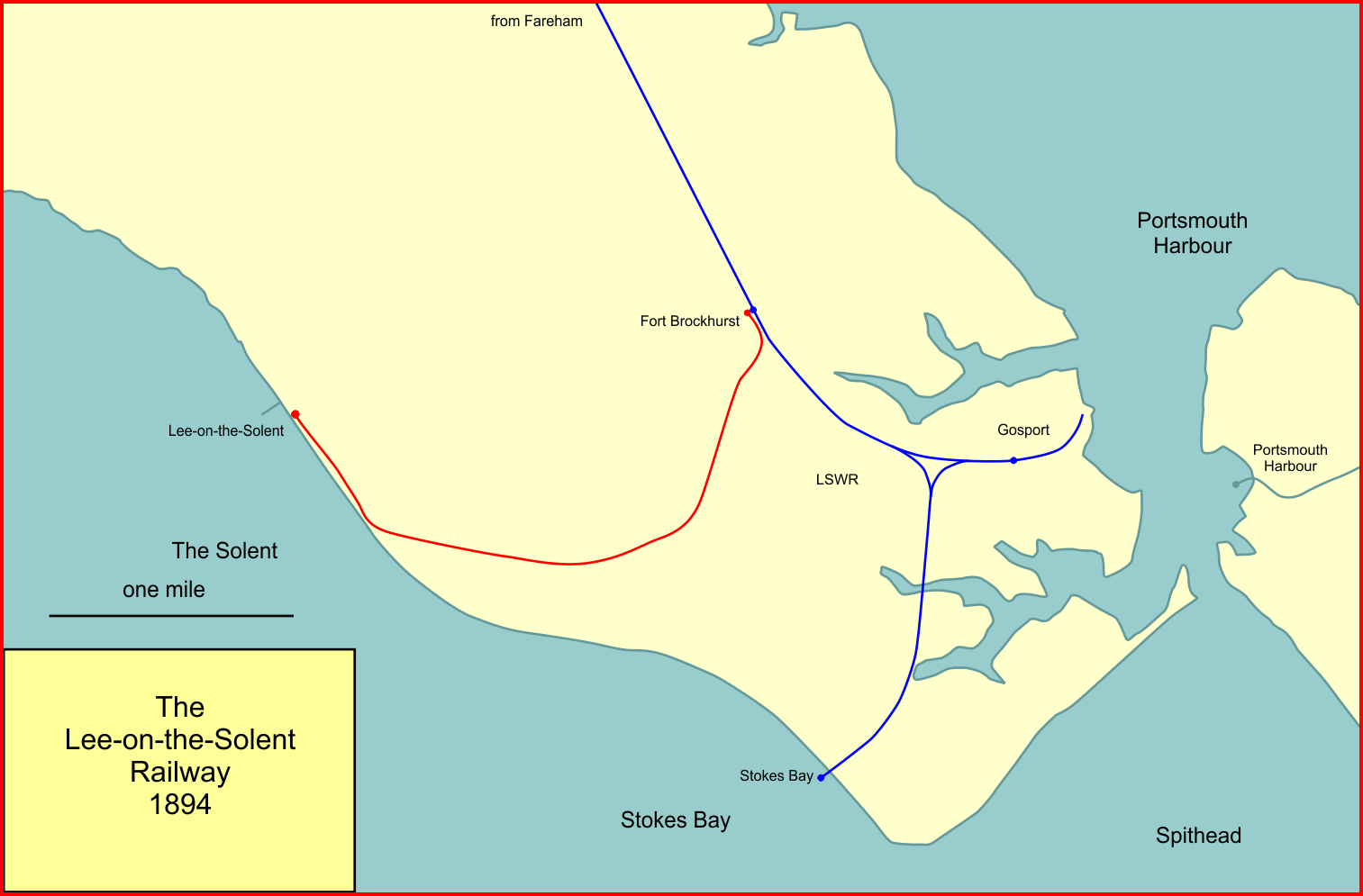

Lee-on-the-Solent railway station served the district of Lee-on-the-Solent, Hampshire, England from 1894 to 1935 on the Lee-on-Solent Line.

== History ==
The station opened on 12 May 1894 by the Lee-on-the-Solent Railway. It was situated on the west side of Marine Parade on the B3333. Like the rest of the halts on the line, it closed temporarily on 31 August 1914 and reopened on 1 October 1914. In 1917, a seaplane depot opened nearby and was accessible via rail. The freight traffic handled at the station was coal and building materials used for houses that were being built nearby. The station closed to passengers on 1 January 1931 and to goods traffic on 30 September 1935. After closure the station building was converted into an amusement arcade.

Preceding station	Disused railways	Following station
Elmore Halt; Line and station closed	Lee-on-the-Solent Railway	Terminus
