= Browndown Halt railway station =

Disused railway station in Gosport, Hampshire

Browndown Halt

General information
- Location: Gosport, Hampshire; England
- Coordinates: 50.7918°N 1.1813°W
- Grid reference: SZ578994
- Platforms: 1

Other information
- Status: Disused

History
- Original company: Lee-on-the-Solent Railway
- Pre-grouping: Lee-on-the-Solent Railway
- Post-grouping: Southern Railway

Key dates
- 12 May 1894: Opened
- 31 August 1914: Closed temporarily
- 1 October 1914: Reopened
- 1 May 1930: Closed
Location

Browndown Halt railway station served the town of Gosport, Hampshire, England from 1894 to 1930 on the Lee-on-the-Solent Railway.

== History ==
The station opened on 12 May 1894 by the Lee-on-the-Solent Railway. It was situated on the south side of Portsmouth Road, near a military training area. This was the busiest halt on the line due to the armed forces using the training grounds nearby, although it was also the only halt that had no waiting shelter. The station closed temporarily on 31 August 1914 but reopened on 1 October 1914. It later closed again to passengers and goods traffic on 1 May 1930.

| Preceding station | Disused railways | Following station |
|---|---|---|
| Fort Gomer Halt; Line and station closed | Lee-on-the-Solent Railway | Elmore Halt; Line and station closed |
