= Fort Gomer Halt railway station =

Disused railway station in Gosport, Hampshire

Fort Gomer Halt

General information
- Location: Gosport, Hampshire; England
- Coordinates: 50.7939°N 1.1642°W
- Grid reference: SZ590997
- Platforms: 1

Other information
- Status: Disused

History
- Original company: Lee-on-the-Solent Railway
- Post-grouping: Southern Railway

Key dates
- 12 May 1894: Opened as Privett Halt
- October 1909: Name changed to Fort Gomer Halt
- 31 August 1914: Closed temporarily
- 1 October 1914: Reopened
- 1 May 1930: Closed
Location

Fort Gomer Halt railway station served the town of Gosport, Hampshire, England from 1894 to 1930 on the Lee-on-the-Solent Railway.

== History ==
The station opened on 12 May 1894 as Privett Halt by the Lee-on-the-Solent Railway. It was situated on Privett Road on the B3333, which now runs through the site of the station. The name was changed to Fort Gomer Halt in October 1909 to avoid confusion with Privett station. The station temporarily closed to passengers on 31 August 1914 but reopened on 1 October 1914. It later closed again to passengers and goods traffic on 1 May 1930.

Preceding station	Disused railways	Following station
Browndown Halt; Line and station closed	Lee-on-the-Solent Railway	Fort Brockhurst; Line and station closed
