= Elmore Halt railway station =

Disused railway station in Lee-on-Solent, Hampshire

Elmore Halt

General information
- Location: Lee-on-Solent, Hampshire; England
- Coordinates: 50.7941°N 1.1964°W
- Grid reference: SZ567996
- Platforms: 1

Other information
- Status: Disused

History
- Original company: Lee-on-the-Solent Railway
- Pre-grouping: Lee-on-the-Solent Railway
- Post-grouping: Southern Railway

Key dates
- 11 April 1910: Opened
- 31 August 1914: Closed temporarily
- 1 October 1914: Reopened
- 1 May 1930: Closed
Location

Elmore Halt railway station served the suburbs of Lee-on-Solent, Hampshire, England from 1910 to 1930 on the Lee-on-the-Solent Railway.

== History ==
The station opened on 11 April 1910 by the Lee-on-the-Solent Railway. It was situated on the south side of the B3333. Unlike the other two halts on the line it didn't open in 1894. The station closed temporarily on 31 August 1914 and reopened on 1 October 1914, before closing permanently on 1 May 1930.

Preceding station	Disused railways	Following station
Browndown Halt; Line and station closed	Lee-on-the-Solent Railway	Lee-on-the-Solent; Line and station closed
