= Foryd Pier railway station =

Disused railway station in Kinmel Bay, Conwy, Wales

Foryd Pier

General information
- Location: Kinmel Bay, Flintshire; Wales
- Coordinates: 53.3143°N 3.5111°W
- Grid reference: SH994807

Other information
- Status: Disused

History
- Original company: Vale of Clwyd Railway
- Pre-grouping: London and North Western Railway
- Post-grouping: London, Midland and Scottish Railway

Key dates
- August 1859: Opened
- 20 April 1885: Closed
Location

Foryd Pier railway station served the village of Kinmel Bay, known as Foryd at the time, in the historical county of Flintshire, Wales, from 1859 to 1885 on the Vale of Clwyd Railway.

== History ==
The station was opened in August 1859 by the Vale of Clwyd Railway. It didn't appear in the timetable. It was resited closer to the river mouth on 1 October 1865. It was intended to run trains to connect to the pier so passengers could take the steam ship to Liverpool. This never materialised as the station was hardly ever used, so it closed on 20 April 1885.

Preceding station	Disused railways	Following station
Terminus	Vale of Clwyd Railway	Foryd; Line and station closed
