= Fort Brockhurst railway station =

Disused railway station in Gosport, Hampshire

Fort Brockhurst
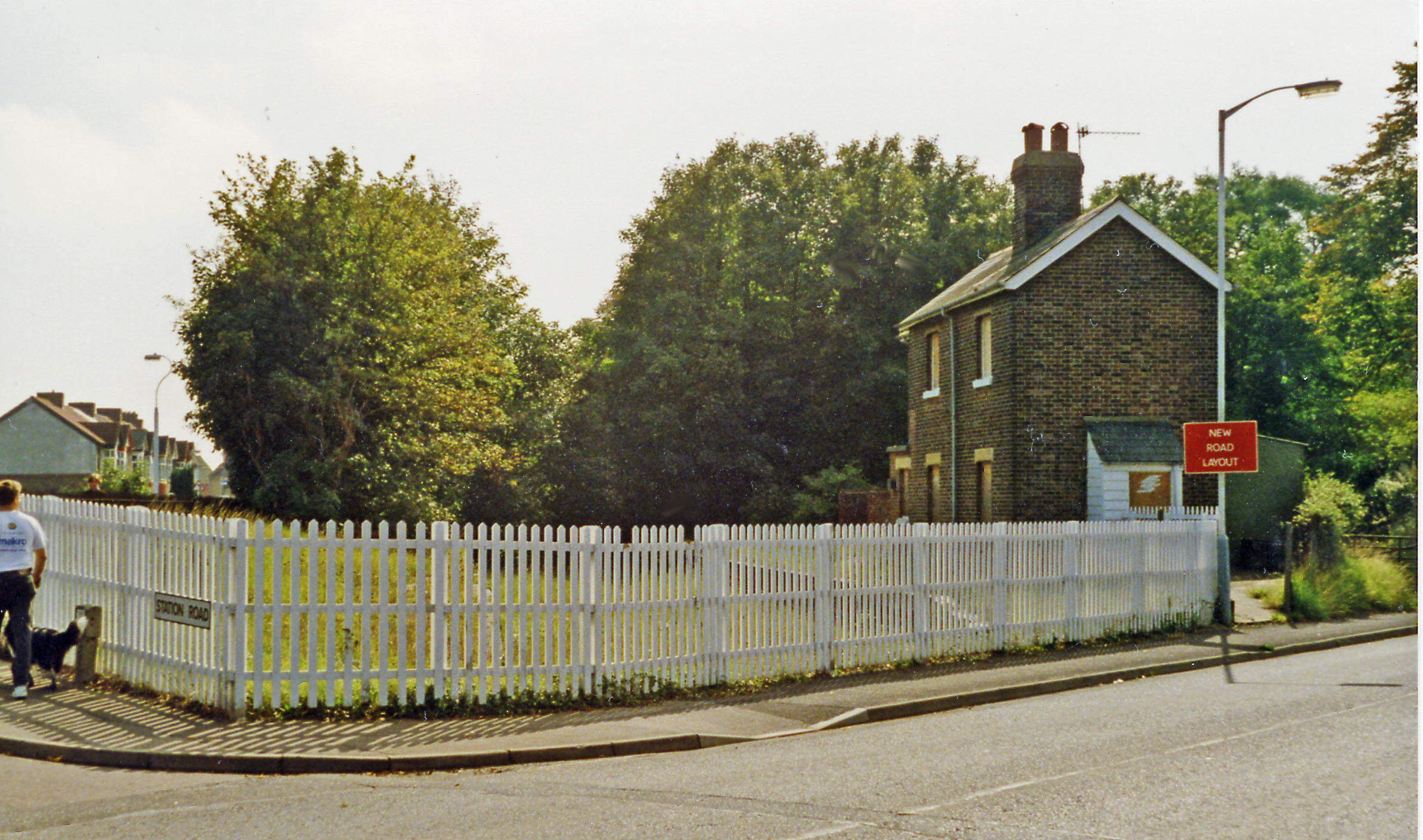
- The site of the station, looking southeast towards Lee-on-the-Solent, in 1993

General information
- Location: Gosport, Hampshire; England
- Coordinates: 50.8074°N 1.1567°W
- Grid reference: SU594013
- Platforms: 3

Other information
- Status: Disused

History
- Original company: London and South Western Railway
- Post-grouping: Southern Railway; British Railways (Southern Region)

Key dates
- 1 November 1865: Opened as Brockhurst
- 17 November 1893: Name changed to Fort Brockhurst
- 8 June 1953: Closed
Location

Fort Brockhurst railway station served the town of Gosport, Hampshire, England from 1865 to 1953 on the Fareham-Gosport line.

== History ==
The station opened on 1 November 1865 as Brockhurst by the London and South Western Railway. It was situated on the east side of Military Road. The station's name was changed to Fort Brockhurst on 17 November 1893 to avoid confusion with Brockenhurst station in Hampshire. It originally had two platforms but a third one was built when the Lee-on-the-Solent branch opened in 1894. Most of the traffic handled at the station was naval or military related. Passenger services that ran on the Lee-on-Solent Line ceased on 1 January 1931. The station closed to both passengers and goods traffic on 8 June 1953.

Preceding station	Disused railways	Following station
Fareham; Line closed, station open	London and South Western Railway; Fareham-Gosport line	Gosport; Line and station closed
Fort Gomer Halt; Line and station closed	London and South Western Railway; Lee-on-Solent Line	Terminus
Gosport Road and Alverstoke	London and South Western Railway; Stokes Bay Line	Terminus
