= Derwenthaugh railway station =

Disused railway station in Swalwell, Tyne and Wear

Derwenthaugh
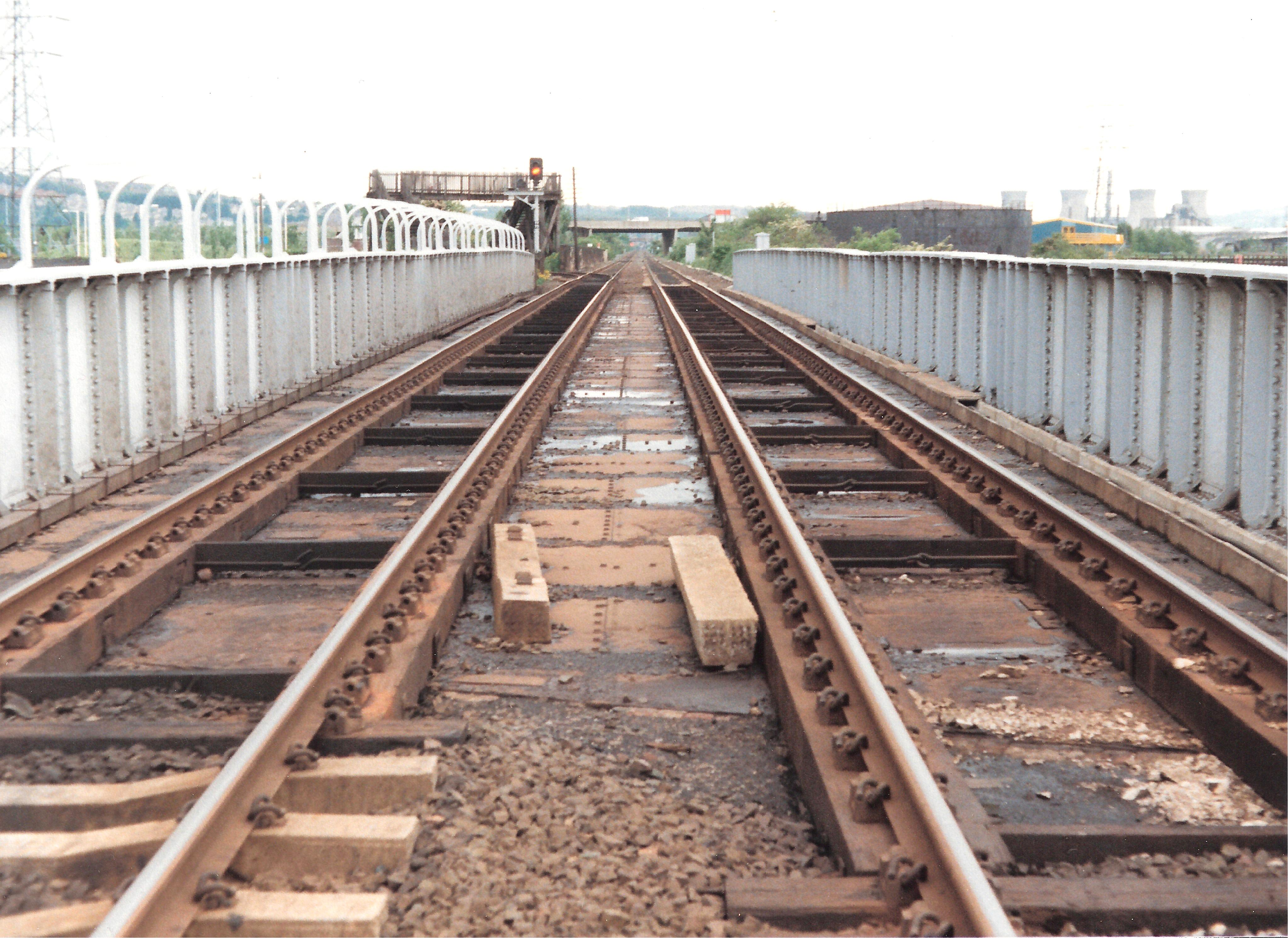
- The railway bridge near the station in 1987

General information
- Location: Swalwell, Tyne and Wear; England
- Coordinates: 54.9635°N 1.6832°W
- Grid reference: NZ503632

Other information
- Status: Disused

History
- Original company: Newcastle and Carlisle Railway
- Pre-grouping: North Eastern Railway

Key dates
- 11 June 1836: Opened
- August 1850: Closed
- November 1852: Reopened
- February 1868: Closed
Location

Derwenthaugh railway station served the village of Swalwell, Tyne and Wear, England from 1836 to 1868 on the Newcastle and Carlisle Railway.

== History ==
The station opened in 1836 by the Newcastle and Carlisle Railway. It closed in August 1850 but reopened in November 1852 before closing permanently in 1868.

Preceding station	Disused railways	Following station
Redheugh; Line and station closed	Newcastle and Carlisle Railway	Blaydon; Line closed, station open
