= Gosport and Cosham lines =

Railway lines in Hampshire, England

The Gosport and Cosham lines were a collection of railway lines in southern Hampshire. Most of the lines are now closed but some elements are still in use, forming part of the West Coastway line. The lines originally linked to the main London to Southampton line via the Eastleigh–Fareham line and subsequently with a line from Southampton via Bursledon, both of which are still in use.

The London and Southampton Railway constructed a first class main line from London to Southampton, opened in 1839. After a name change to the London and South Western Railway (LSWR) it opened a branch from Bishopstoke (later known as Eastleigh to Gosport through Fareham, serving Portsmouth by a ferry crossing, in 1840. The LSWR later extended its line to Portsmouth itself by a branch line from Fareham, and joined forces with a competitor, the London, Brighton and South Coast Railway, meeting it at Cosham; this connection opened in 1848. There was a jointly operated Portsmouth station.

Leisure travel to the Isle of Wight developed, but the Portsmouth station was not at all close to the steamer terminal; the Gosport station was also awkwardly located. A new pier at Stokes Bay was opened, with a branch line off the Fareham to Gosport line; this offered a direct transfer from train to steamer, but the railway transit from London was rather circuitous, and the opening of the Portsmouth Direct line in 1859 and the extension of the railway at Portsmouth to Portsmouth Harbour station and the steamer berth there, negated the advantage. Also branching from the Gosport line was a branch to Lee-on-the-Solent, in support of a new seaside resort with its own pleasure pier. The development was not commercially successful.

More prosaic branch openings followed: the Netley branch from Southampton was extended to Fareham in 1889; the Bishops Waltham branch from Botley opened in 1863, but was extremely unsuccessful in commercial terms. The Meon Valley Railway from Alton, intended as a secondary main line, opened in 1904, in association with repairs to the troublesome Knowle Tunnel, a short distance north of Fareham.

The Eastleigh and Southampton lines to Fareham and Cosham continue in operation, and were electrified in 1990, transforming the passenger train service pattern.

== Gosport branch ==
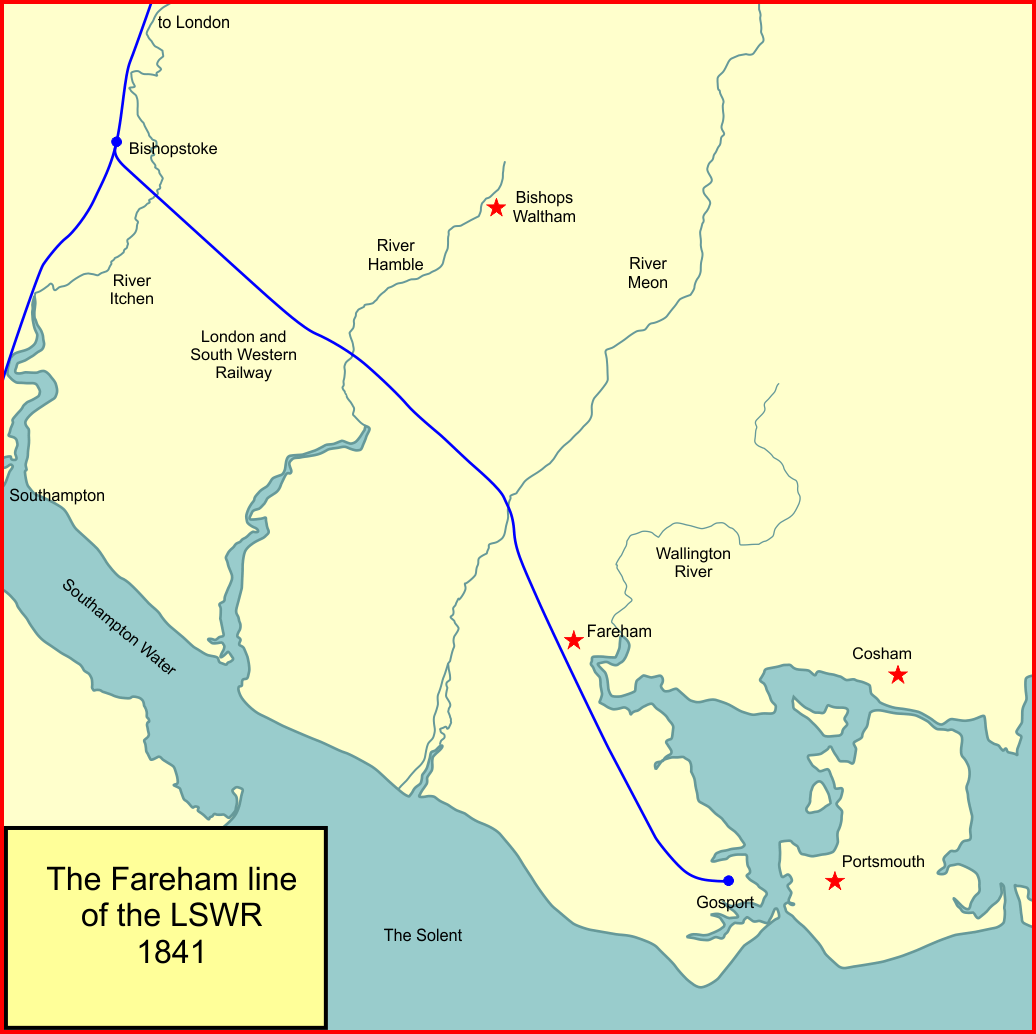
The Fareham lines in 1841

One of the earliest of long-distance railways, the London and Southampton Railway opened its line between those places on 11 May 1840. During the construction period, the Portsmouth Junction Railway was promoted: it would build a branch line from Bishopstoke (later known as Eastleigh) on the London and Southampton Railway, via Botley, Fareham and Cosham to Portsmouth. Influential residents of Portsmouth opposed the idea; there was considerable hostility between Portsmouth and Southampton, and it seemed to them unthinkable for Portsmouth to be on a branch line of a main line to Southampton.

In November 1838 a meeting in Portsmouth discussed a railway to London; an independent line all the way was considered, but the cost – £1.5 million – made it daunting, and in a remarkable change of mind a deputation from Portsmouth was sent to ask the L&SR to reinstate the branch project. With some vindictiveness this was turned down. The L&SR was now planning an 18 miles (29 km) branch line from Bishopstoke to Gosport, relying on a "floating bridge" – that is, a ferry – that was being planned to cross the body of water known as Portsmouth Harbour.

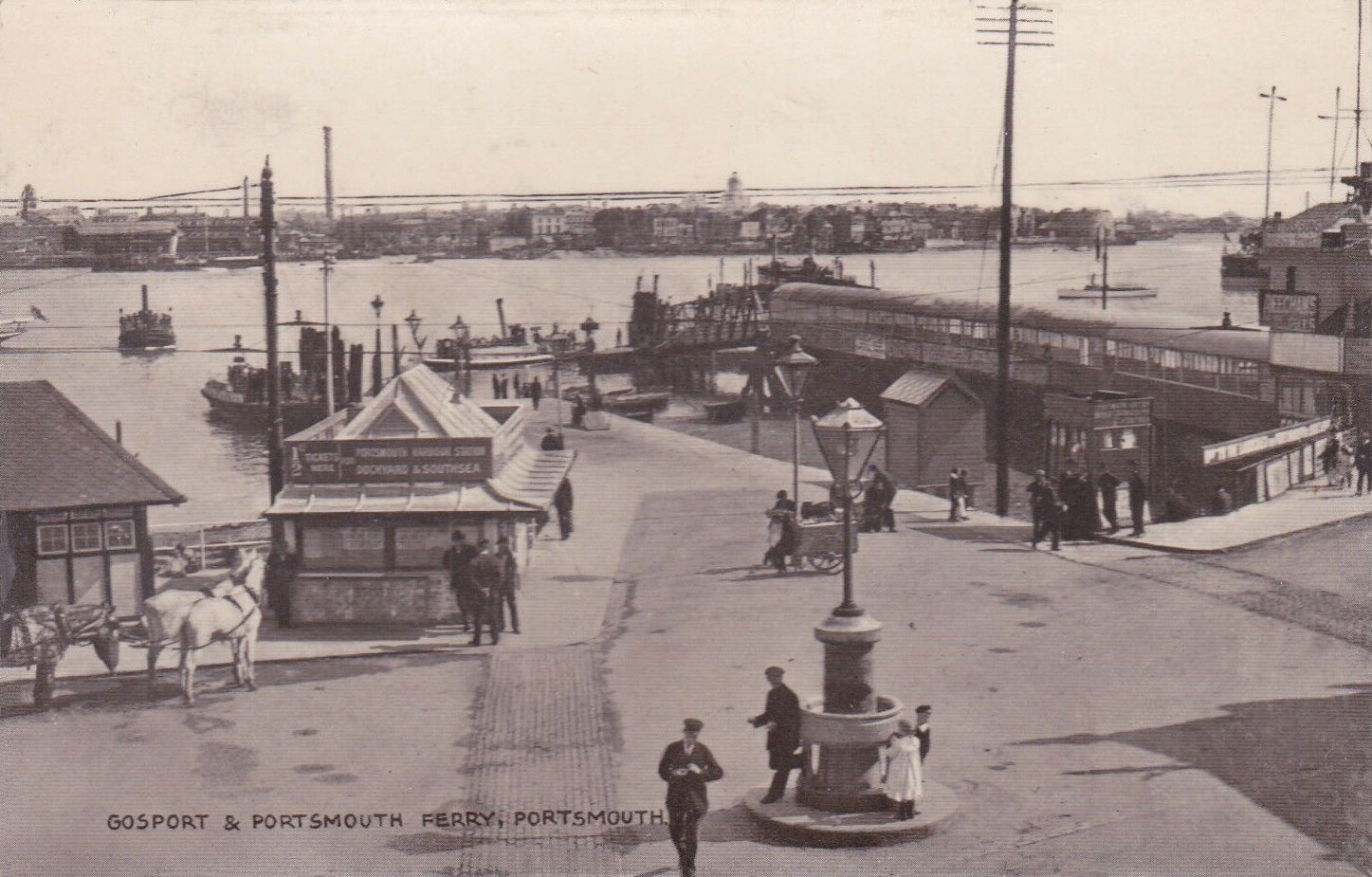
Gosport ferry

The decision to go to Gosport had considerable significance, condemning Portsmouth passengers and goods to a ferry crossing to start their journey. A railway from Bishopstoke to Portsmouth, round the head of Portsmouth Harbour, would only have been three miles longer. Williams briefly explains the reasoning:

By taking their own line just over fifteen miles to Gosport. The L&S directors hoped to save £120,000, land and earthworks being cheaper than on the eighteen-mile route round the harbour to Portsmouth.

The L&SR got the authorising act of Parliament for its Gosport branch, the London and South Western Railway (Portsmouth Branch Railway) Act 1839 (2 & 3 Vict. c. xxviii), on 4 June 1839, capital £300,000; the branch would run from Bishopstoke through Botley and Fareham to Gosport. As a concession to Portsmouth sensitivities, the act also authorised changing the name of the L&SR to the London and South Western Railway.

Work was proceeding well and a planned opening on 26 July 1841 was announced, but on 11 July 1841 Knowle Tunnel (Note: Williams refers to the tunnel as Fareham Tunnel.) partly collapsed. About 40 yards of tunnel lining needed to be remade. It transpired that the ground through which the tunnel was being constructed was of a particularly unstable clay. The trouble extended and cutting slopes outside the tunnel were affected too. The line reopened on 29 November 1841 but fresh slips closed it again on 3 December 1841; it finally opened on 7 February 1842.

Gosport station was "a remarkably fine building, described as one of the finest pieces of external railway architecture... from the beginning of the railway age." The architect William Tite designed a massive station with arrival and departure platforms fronted on one side by an equally impressive stone colonnade. The station cost over £10,980, equal to about £1.25 million as of 2022 compared with the £1,509 spent on Bishopstoke and £1,391 at Fareham. However it suffered from the major disadvantage of not being on the waterside, due to being excluded from the fortified area surrounding the Royal Navy establishments at Portsmouth Harbour. In consequence the station was over half a mile from the landing stage for the ferry to Portsmouth.

The construction of the branch from Bishopstoke had cost £404,271, or 25% more than the estimated cost. A train service of two fast, four mixed and two goods trains daily was operated; two mixed trains ran on Sundays. Through carriages avoided a change of trains at Bishopstoke on some services. Intending Isle of Wight passengers from London transferred from Gosport to the Quebec Tavern, Portsmouth, before embarking on the Portsmouth and Ryde Steam Company's vessel, the Union, which made five daily return trips to Ryde. The 1841 daily summer service had been eight trips by two vessels, but when the Gosport branch opened they used a new pier there for six daily and four Sunday sailings, connecting with trains and crossing within half an hour.

== Royal Clarence Yard ==
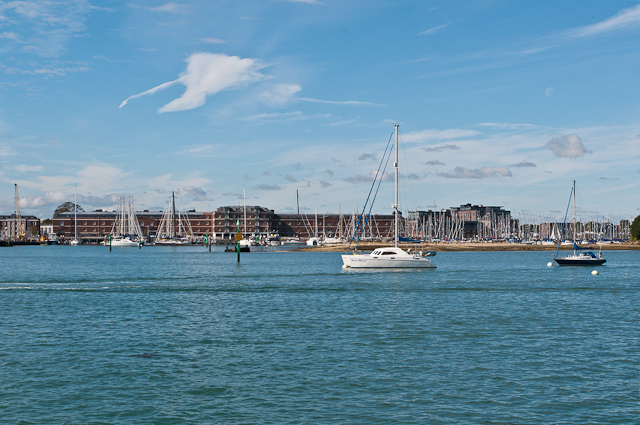
Clarence Yard viewed from Portsmouth Harbour

A large area within the Portsmouth fortifications was used for the supply of stores to naval vessels, and in 1831 this was formalised and the area was named the Royal Clarence Victualling Yard.

In October 1844 the King of France, Louis Philippe I, made a state visit to Windsor. He arrived from France at Portsmouth in the French steamer Gomer, and disembarked at the Victualling Yard, on 8 October. Prince Albert met him there and they travelled together by special train to Farnborough, and then by road to Windsor Castle where Queen Victoria received him. On 14 October 1844 King Louis Philippe made the return journey from Farnborough to Gosport, accompanied by the Queen and Prince Albert. On arrival at Gosport station, they drove to the victualing yard to embark for France.

The public part of the arrival and departure of the French King involved considerable and lengthy formalities, including a long speech of address from Portsmouth Corporation. By contrast, once berthed at the Clarence Yard, the public were excluded and the disembarkation could proceed without delay. Prince Albert considered that the use of the Victualling Yard for transfer from train to steamer was convenient because of its privacy within the Portsmouth fortifications, and asked if the Gosport station railway line could be extended into it. It was found to be practicable to do so. An extension line was made and on 13 September 1845 Major Pasley of the Board of Trade visited, reporting that the line was an

"Extension into the Royal Clarence Yard, thereby obtaining a communication with Portsmouth Harbour for the use of Her Majesty and for government purposes exclusively. The extension is 605 yards in length proceeding from the terminus station. A reception road for the accommodation of Her Majesty is proposed to be built at the extremity of the extension." The extension was opened on 13 September 1845.

The extension line had cost £8,000. In fact the line was heavily used for bringing consumable supplies to the Clarence Yard, including cattle, which were slaughtered within the Royal Navy dockyard. The Royal Navy used large quantities of bunkering coal, mostly brought in on the line.

In 1845 Queen Victoria acquired Osborne House on the Isle of Wight and spent much time there, extending and improving it. The journeys of the royal family habitually involved the use of the Clarence Yard station; it was never available to the public. After the death of Queen Victoria in 1901, there was less travel to Osborne as King Edward VII was uninterested in staying there. In 1971 the station was demolished.

The station was known as Clarence Yard Gosport or alternatively Gosport Royal Victoria Station; it was open from 21 September 1845 until 1 February 1901.

== Lines to Portsmouth ==
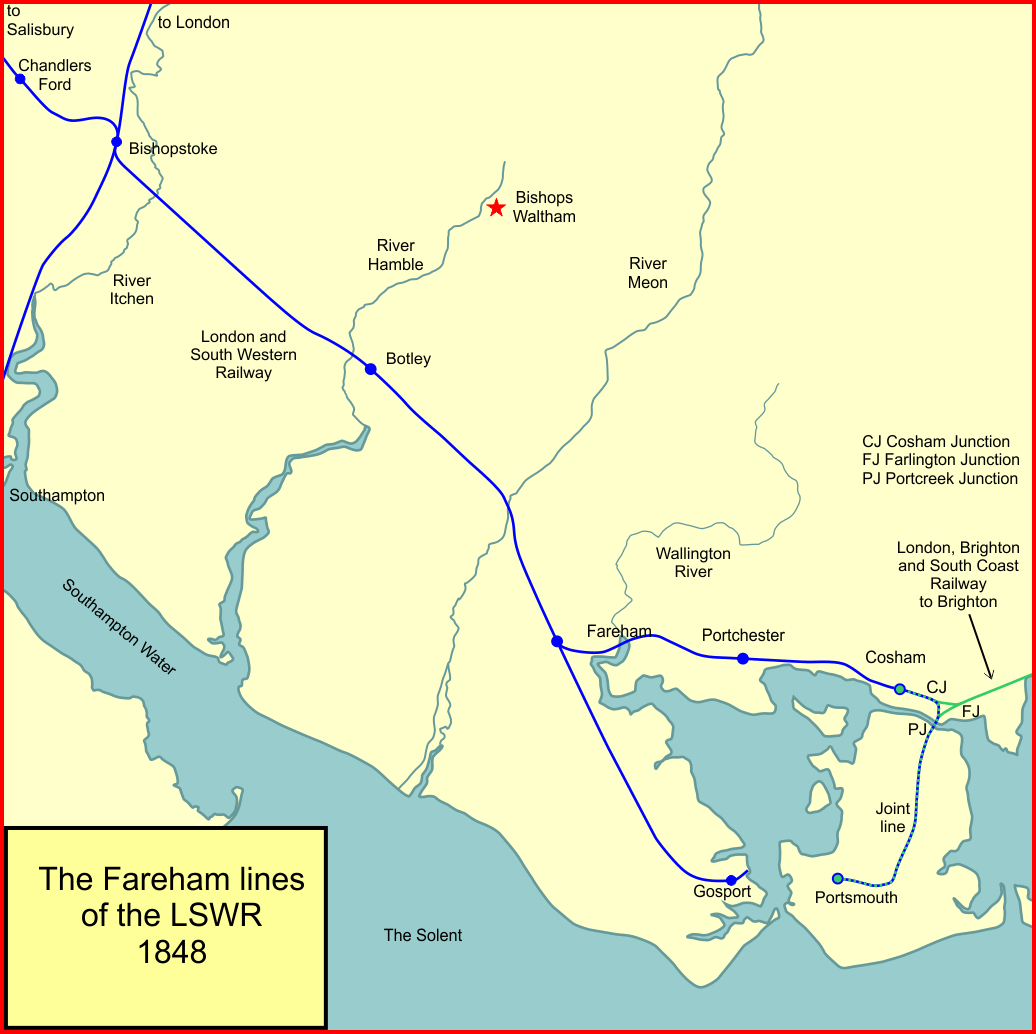
The Fareham lines in 1848 – extending to Cosham

Portsmouth had a railway, of sorts, but the ferry crossing to Gosport, the road transfer between Gosport station and the ferry berth, and the roundabout railway route via Bishopstoke, continued to be a source of dissatisfaction. Independent promoters put forward a more direct line from London, while the Brighton and Chichester Railway, connected with the London and Brighton Railway, talked of extending from Chichester to Portsmouth, forming a route from London via Brighton.

This came to a head in 1845, at the height of the Railway Mania, when a huge number of proposed railways were being put to Parliament, not all of them realistic. Parliament commissioned an advisory board headed by Lord Dalhousie, that came to be known as the Five Kings, or more formally Lord Dalhousie's Board. The purpose of the board was to sift the applications for railway schemes and recommend which should proceed. Dalhousie's board looked at the several schemes for a railway to Portsmouth and approved a line from Guildford via Chichester to Portsmouth and Fareham, but rejected several others. When the bills in question came to Parliament, things were different and Parliament approved a Direct Portsmouth scheme from Epsom to Portsmouth, possibly using the atmospheric system. Another proposed line from Guildford to Portsmouth was cut back to include only a section from Fareham to Portsmouth and the Brighton and Chichester Railway's extension to Portsmouth was approved. Accordingly three lines into Portsmouth were set to proceed, and two were authorised between Cosham and Fareham. However the approvals were deferred, and only the Brighton and Chichester Railway extension to Portsmouth was actually authorised.

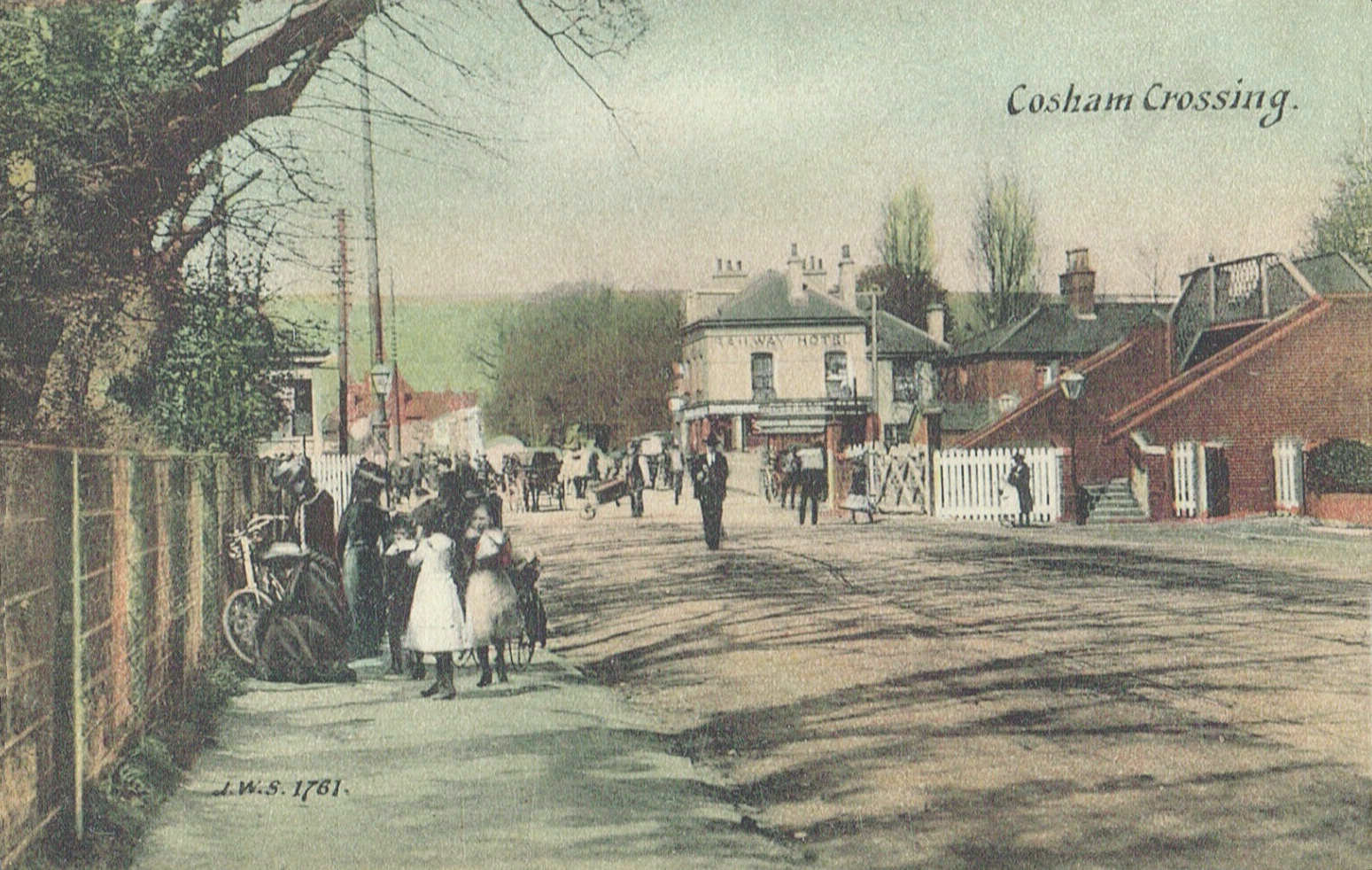
Cosham crossing

In the 1846 session, some of the stalled projects reappeared. In particular a line from Fareham to Portsmouth line was passed on 27 July 1846 as part of the very truncated Guildford Extension and Portsmouth and Fareham Railway. The reduction of the through main route to just a stub was a grave disappointment to its promoters, and on 26 August 1846 they met and agreed to sell their (unbuilt) line to the LSWR. So the LSWR now inherited authorisation for a branch from Fareham to Portsmouth, while two other lines in Portsmouth had parliamentary approval.

The London, Brighton and South Coast Railway (LBSCR) was formed in 1846 by the amalgamation of the London and Brighton Railway, the London and Croydon Railway, Brighton and Chichester Railway and others. In October 1846 the LSWR and the LBSCR agreed instead of their two routes between Cosham and Portsmouth, one line would be jointly constructed and jointly managed. On 22 July 1847 an act of Parliament, the North British (Edinburgh, Dunfermline and Perth) Railway Act 1863 (26 & 27 Vict. c. ccxiii) was passed in which a minor clause arranged that the part of the Brighton and Chichester Railway (now LBSCR) extension west of Havant was to be operated jointly, and would be known as the Joint Line. The Brighton and Chichester extension opened from Chichester to Havant on 15 March 1847 and to Portsmouth on 14 June 1847.

Both companies met in September 1848, reaching yet another agreement to transfer the Cosham to Portsmouth line to Joint control. The LSWR now withdrew its proposed independent line to Portsmouth. The LBSCR had opened the Portcreek Junction and Farlington Junction lines to Cosham Junction on 26 July 1848, though LSWR passenger trains did not run until 1 October 1848. The LBSCR dropped its separate Fareham to Cosham branch in favour of the LSW line, which opened between those points on 1 September 1848.

== Portsmouth Railway ==
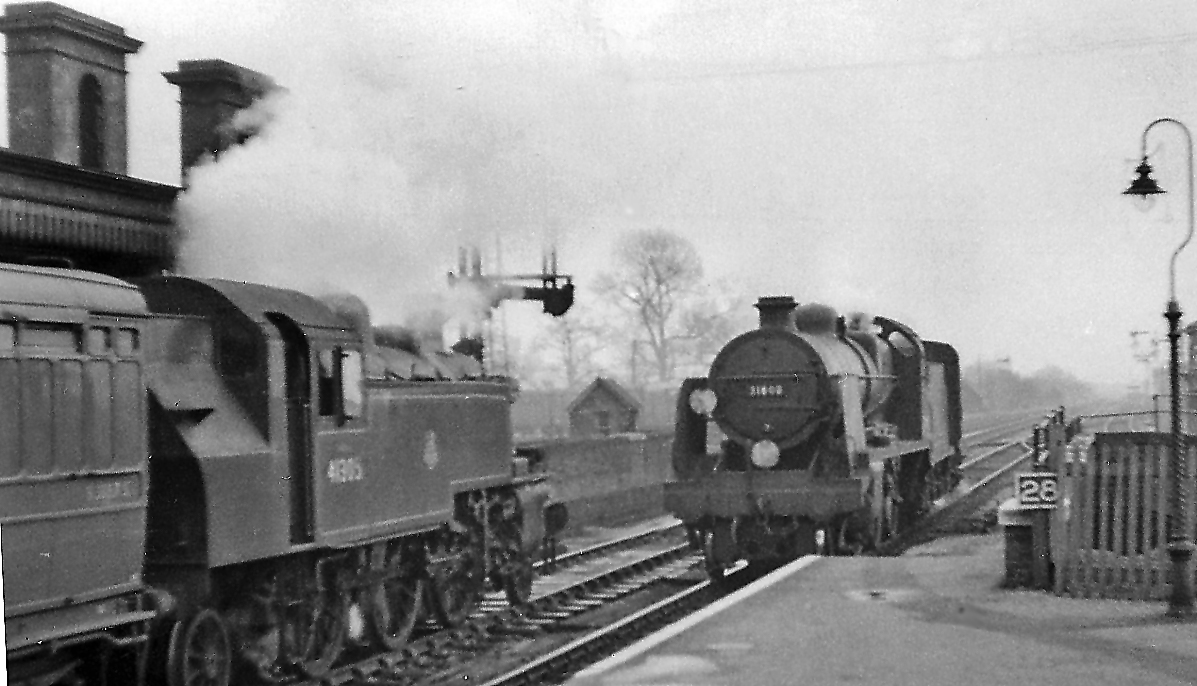
Trains pass at Fareham station

The construction of the Portsmouth Railway (most of the present-day Portsmouth Direct Line) reopened the tensions between the LSWR and the LBSCR, and among other things a rate-cutting war developed. This was ended by agreement from 8 August 1859 and the LSWR agreed to pay the LBSCR £2,500 annually to use the Havant to Portcreek line, instead of the toll payable by the Portsmouth company under the Portsmouth Railway Amendment Act 1858 (21 & 22 Vict. c. ci) of 1858. This included the Farlington Junction to Cosham Junction line, which the LBSCR had uplifted as useless. It now undertook to relay it, and the line re-opened on 2 January 1860 with a weekday service of one train each way between Cosham and Havant, and two trains (increased to three in February) each way between Portsmouth and Havant via Cosham. The LSWR obtained powers on 6 August 1860 to abandon the proposed parallel Havant to Portcreek and Cosham lines and an independent Portsmouth station.

== Admiralty connections on the Gosport line ==
During the First World War railway wagons used the Gosport and Fareham Electric Tramway's line to reach the naval yard at Bedenham. This was because its gauge of 4 ft 7 1/2 in (1,410 mm) allowed railway wheels to run in the tramway track grooves with their tyres clear of the running surface. Bedenham Magazine Depot was served by a siding, opened in June 1911 from the main line and extended in March 1914 to another magazine depot at Priddy's Yard.

The logistics facilities supporting the Royal Navy at Portsmouth were increased over time, and for heavy materials arriving and being removed, the railway was an essential partner. Between Fareham and Fort Brockhurst there was a connection to Bedenham on the north side of the line. This was opened in April 1911 serving the Bedenham Magazine depot with the main line. There was a dense complex of internal sidings, including some pre-existing narrow gauge lines. The standard gauge sidings were worked by fireless locomotives because of the danger of explosion, although in later years an ordinary steam engine was used, fitted with a chimney spark arrester.

The internal sidings were extended northwards about March 1914 to a Magazine Depot at Priddy's Hard, still within the complex. The last standard gauge train from Priddy's Hard ran on 14 January 1986 and the track was taken up soon afterwards. The Navy vacated the depot in 1988 and the site was redeveloped for housing.

== Stokes Bay ==
As the popularity of the Isle of Wight as a holiday destination increased, the inconvenience of transferring from trains to the ferry became more prominent. In 1863 the Stokes Bay Railway and Pier company opened its line, from Fort Brockhurst, near Gosport on the LSWR line, to a new pier at Stokes Bay. The LSWR worked the line and provided through coaches from Bishopstoke. At first train movements had to reverse at Gosport to reach the branch, but in 1865 a western spur was opened and two trains daily ran direct from Bishopstoke to Stokes Bay.

Although passengers transferred directly on the pier from trains to the ferry, the train journey from London was rather roundabout; and unreliability of the ferry operator counted against the reputation of the route. The pier was exposed and in bad weather the ferries were unable to berth. The opening of the Portsmouth Harbour extension railway in 1876 negated the advantage of the transfer at Stokes Bay, but the line continued in use until 1915.

=== Lee-on-the-Solent ===
A landowner, Sir John C. Robinson, decided to develop the area at Lee-on-the-Solent, intending to create a watering place to rival Bournemouth. He realised that a railway connection was needed, and he arranged with business associates to create the Lee-on-the-Solent Railway Company.

It opened in 1894 as a light railway, making a connection with the LSWR Gosport branch at (Fort) Brockhurst. There was no through running at Fort Brockhurst.

Despite poor patronage and loss-making finances, the line continued in use until passenger services were withdrawn in 1930, and the line closed completely in 1935.

=== Bishop's Waltham ===
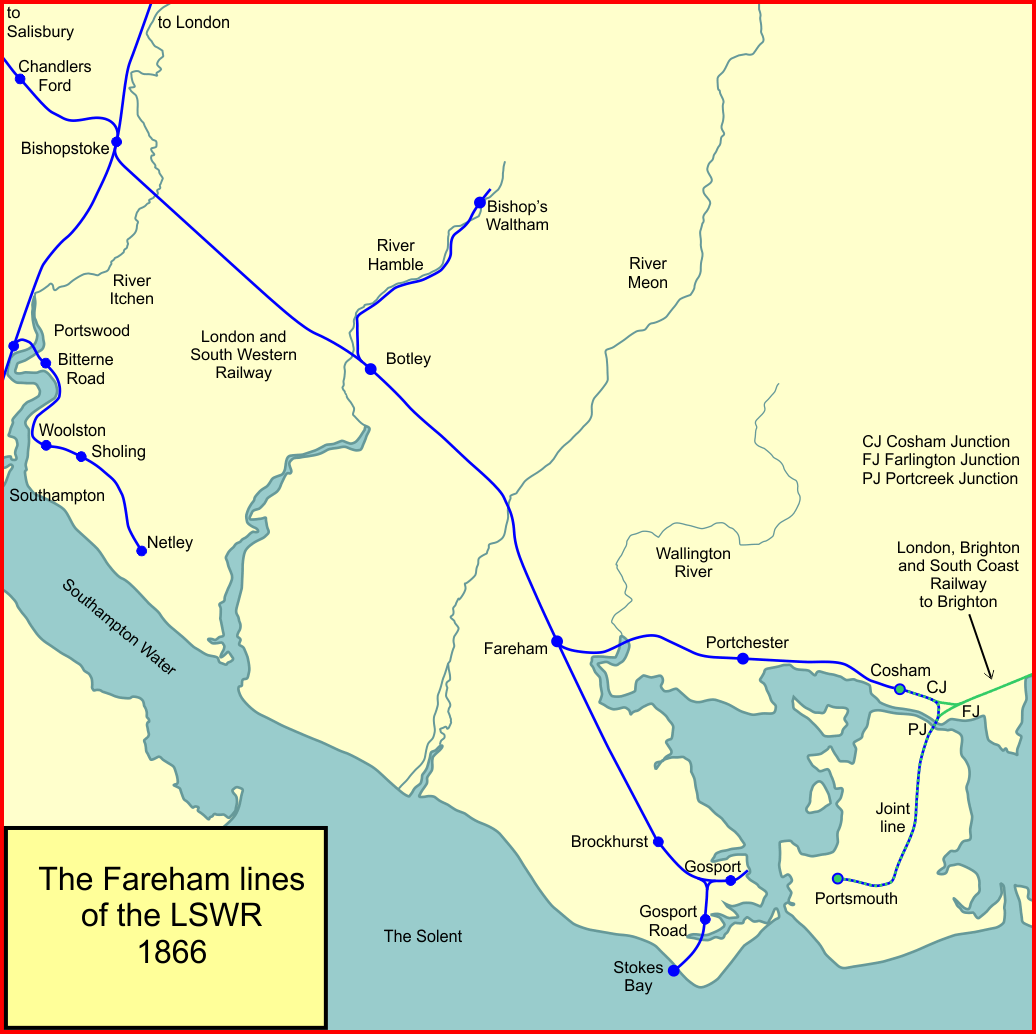
The Fareham lines in 1866

The Bishops Waltham Railway Company obtained the Bishops Waltham Railway Act 1862 (25 & 26 Vict. c. cxliii) on 17 July 1862 to build a line from a junction with the LSWR to Bishops Waltham. The main line junction was to be near Botley, on the Bishopstoke to Fareham line. Captain Rich of the Board of Trade inspected the line on 28 May 1863, and passed it with some reservations. A public opening of the line took place on 1 June 1863. Six trains ran each way on weekdays, three on Sundays, the journey taking 12 minutes.

The company was perpetually short of money, and when an engine shed was needed at Bishop's Waltham in January 1866, the LSWR was persuaded to provide one, charging the company 6% interest on the £500 cost of the construction. A series of writs for payment of debts plunged the company further into financial embarrassment, and on 27 February 1869 the entire board of directors resigned. The LSWR continued to work the line for the time being and the Bishops Waltham Railway board of newly elected directors met on 30 December 1881, to confirm the sale of their company to the LSW for £20,000.

The branch continued under the LSWR and later the Southern Railway, but revenue was so meagre – trains are recorded as running without a single fare-paying passenger – that closure was inevitable. The line closed on 1 January 1933.

=== Netley to Fareham ===
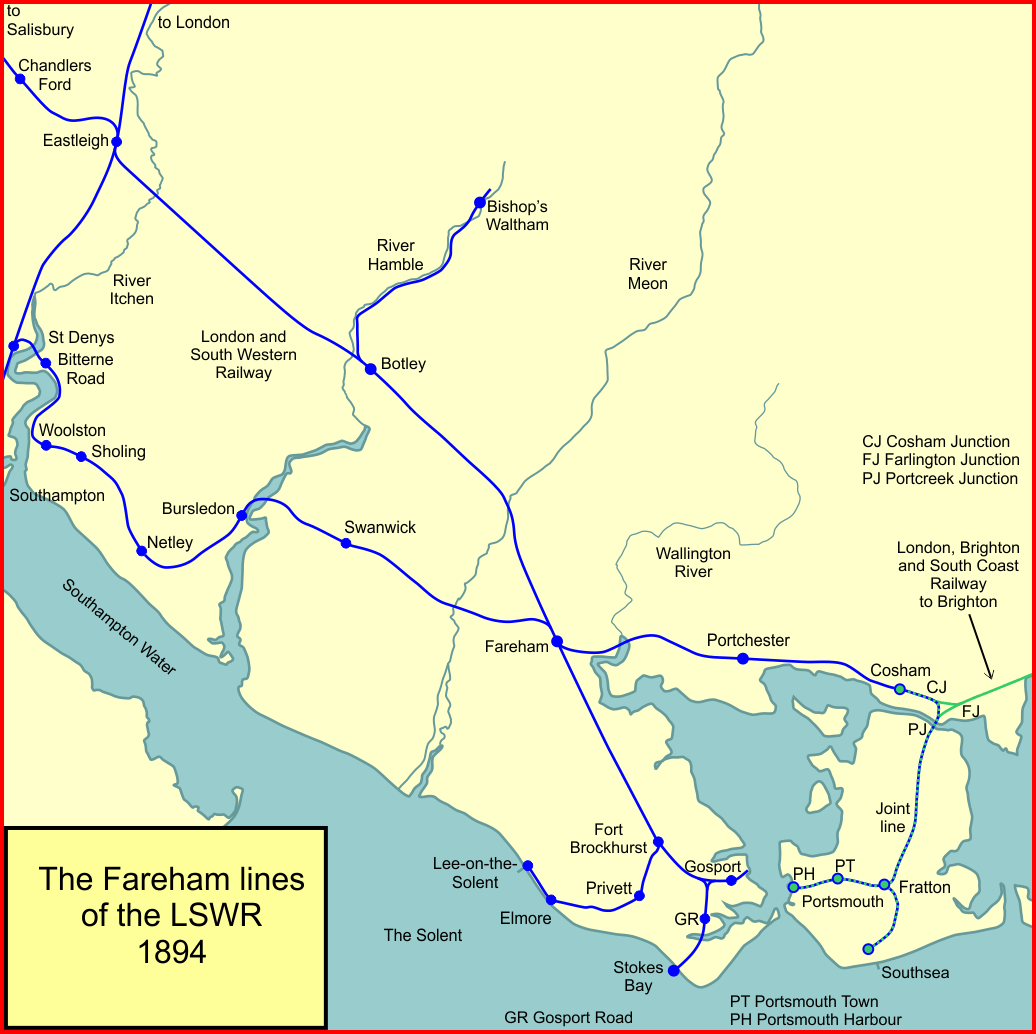
The Fareham lines in 1894

In 1866 the Southampton and Netley Railway had opened, designed chiefly to serve the Royal Victoria Hospital, planned to treat wounded soldiers. The branch ran from St Denys, at first known as Portswood, on the original London and Southampton main line. This left a gap from Netley to the Fareham area, and a Fareham and Netley Railway gained authorisation in the Fareham and Netley Railway Act 1865 (28 & 29 Vict. c. cliii) on 29 June 1865. However the company was unable to raise the necessary capital and it failed to make progress. The military authorities approached the LSWR in 1882 and requested the London and South Western Railway Company to close the railway gap as a matter of national security. The company was quick to comply, obtaining authority in the South Western Railway (Various Powers) Act 1883 (46 & 47 Vict. c. clxxxix) on 20 August 1883. The line was to extend from Netley to enter Fareham from the north. It opened on 2 September 1889.

=== Meon Valley Line and Knowle Tunnel ===
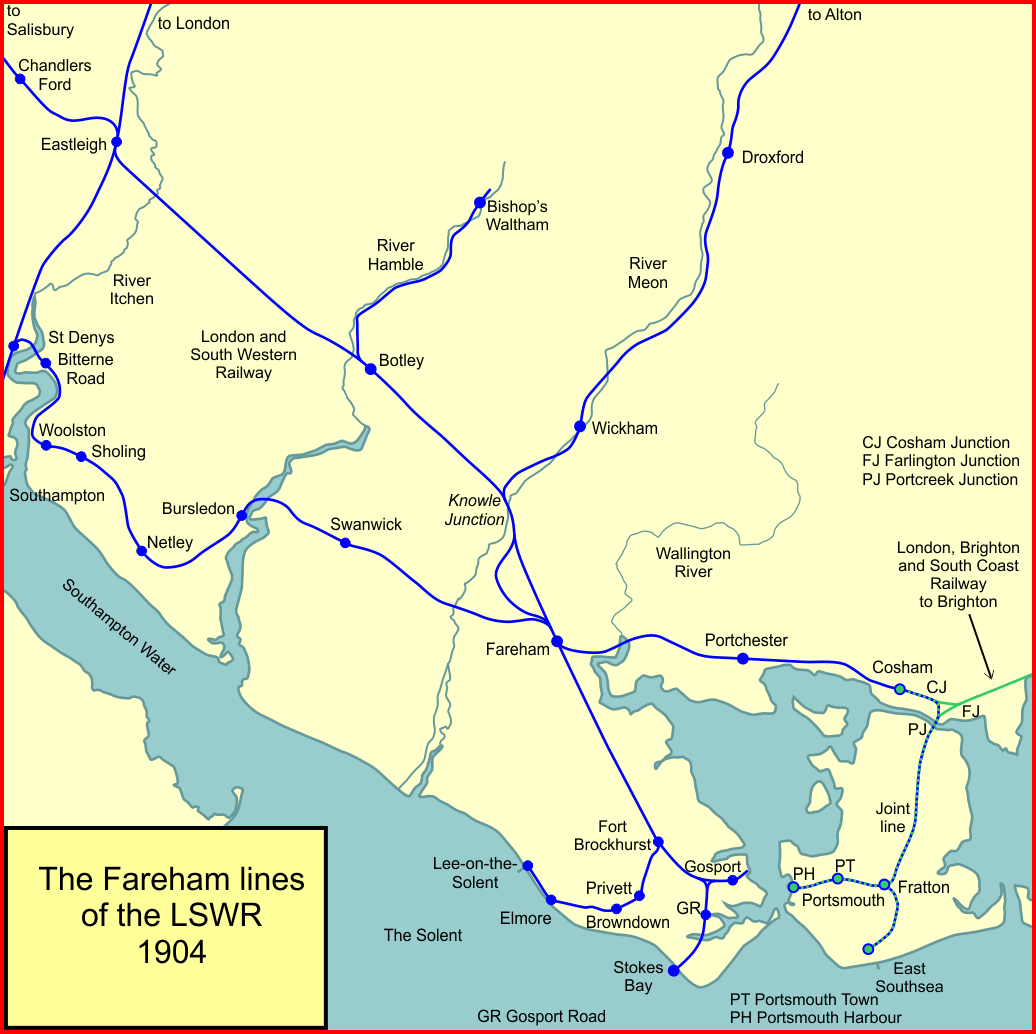
The Fareham lines in 1904

A nominally independent concern promoted a railway from Basingstoke to Fareham down the valley of the River Meon, in 1895. The rival Great Western Railway had a branch line from Reading to Basingstoke, and this proposal was interpreted by the LSWR as an obvious attempt by the Great Western Railway to get access to The Solent, and probably Portsmouth itself. This would be a major loss of primacy in the locality, and although the proposal was defeated in Parliament, the LSWR was alarmed.

As a defensive measure it immediately promoted its own lines covering the route, and this resulted in the Basingstoke and Alton Light Railway, opened in 1901, and the Meon Valley Railway. The latter was authorised on 3 June 1897 and opened on 1 June 1904. It was conceived by the LSWR as a potential main line route to Gosport and the general area, and it was laid out accordingly.

At the south-western end it joined the Bishopstoke (Eastleigh) to Fareham line at Knowle Junction. Knowle Tunnel intervened between the junction and Fareham station, and the tunnel had long given trouble. Earlier repairs had included lining it, reducing its clearances and making it unsatisfactory for main line trains, As part of the work of constructing the Meon Valley line, the Knowle Tunnel was dealt with. The work involved the construction of a single-track deviation line which by-passed the tunnel. On 2 October 1904 this was commissioned for up trains; down trains used the tunnel which had been reduced to single track, overcoming the limited clearance problem.

Double track was laid on the deviation line, and from September 1906 that was brought into service and used exclusively. The tunnel was closed for repairs. The work was completed on 2 June 1907 and the single line in the tunnel was reopened. A third line had been laid between the Bishopstoke end of the tunnel and the junction for the Meon Valley line. The junction points at Knowle were abolished, so that the tunnel single line continued directly on the Meon Valley line to Wickham; the double line on the deviation continued directly towards Botley. In fact the gradients on the deviation line were severe, and this caused difficulty for the heavy freight traffic on the Botley main line, and in 1921 Knowle junction was reinstated to enable running on the moderate gradient through the tunnel.

There was a mental hospital close to the line near Knowle; it was referred to at the time as the County Lunatic Asylum. In 1907 Knowle Asylum Halt opened at Knowle Junction; this was in the three-track section, but only serving the single track for the Meon Valley line. The name of the halt was changed to Knowle Halt in 1942. In the 1950s it had the distinction of being illuminated by two electric lights, when Botley still depended on oil lamps.

== Grouping of the railways ==
In 1923 most of the main line railways of Great Britain were "grouped" – compulsorily reorganised into one or other of four new large companies, the "groups", following the Railways Act 1921. Both the LSWR and the LBSCR were incorporated into the new Southern Railway. The former hostility between them had diminished in recent years, but now was abolished altogether.

== Decline of the Gosport line ==
On 4 March 1934 the Fareham to Gosport line was reduced to single track, except for a passing loop at Fort Brockhurst. On 6 June 1953 the Gosport branch was closed to passengers, and on 6 January 1969 the line closed completely south of the Admiralty siding at Bedenham.

== Electrification ==
In 1937 the Southern Railway implemented the Portsmouth Electrification No. 1 Scheme. This was financed by low-interest loans from the government, under the Railways (Agreement) Act 1935 (26 Geo. 5 & 1 Edw. 8. c. 6). The scheme was to electrify the line between London and Portsmouth via Guildford and Havant. So far as the scope of this article is concerned, that included Farlington Junction to Portsmouth Harbour. Public services started on 4 July 1937.

Authorisation of this scheme was quickly followed by Portsmouth Electrification No. 2 Scheme, which involved the line from Horsham via Arundel and Chichester to Havant.

In 1967 the Bournemouth line from London was electrified; the scheme passed through Eastleigh and Southampton. Like the Portsmouth schemes, this was a third-rail direct current system. The Bournemouth scheme was at 750V in comparison to the nominal 660V of the Portsmouth projects. The scheme was commissioned on 10 July 1967.

Since 1958 most of the passenger service on the intervening network between Portsmouth and Southampton and Eastleigh (and Salisbury) had been operated by Southern Region diesel electric multiple units.

The triangular enclave from the junctions at Cosham to Southampton (actually St Denys) and Eastleigh remained unelectrified, and in the 1980s it was decided to rectify the omission. A £22 million scheme was authorised enabling a new passenger timetable with electric traction to be introduced on 14 May 1990. An official opening had taken place on 9 May when Cecil Parkinson the Secretary of State for Transport visited Hedge End, a new station built to serve an emerging residential area. Parkinson visited the station using an electric train. Actual commissioning had taken place some time previously; there was a Gala Day at Eastleigh on 6 May and an electric train was photographed at Fareham.

This event changed the timetable pattern significantly, as hitherto few passenger trains had used the Farlington Junction to Cosham Junction chord, avoiding Portsmouth. Indeed that had been limited to trains from Brighton to points beyond Southampton, in fact most often to Cardiff. In steam days these trains had often attached a Portsmouth portion at Fareham, but latterly diesel trains ran through. In any case the new timetable included many more trains running direct from Havant to Fareham. Off-peak in October 2022 that includes an hourly Victoria to Southampton and an hourly Brighton to Southampton train. Hourly electric services also run from Portsmouth to Waterloo via Eastleigh.

== The present day ==
The remaining operational routes among the earlier network are from Portsmouth via Cosham to Fareham, Netley and Southampton; and from Fareham to Eastleigh. The other branch lines have closed.

== Fareham and Gosport busway ==
A busway was laid along part of the disused Fareham to Gosport line, opening in 2012 and extended in December 2021, under the brand name Eclipse.
