= Dewsbury Market Place railway station =

Disused railway station in Dewsbury, West Yorkshire

Dewsbury Market Place

General information
- Location: Dewsbury, Kirklees; England
- Coordinates: 53.6903°N 1.6274°W
- Grid reference: SE247216
- Platforms: 2

Other information
- Status: Disused

History
- Original company: Lancashire and Yorkshire Railway
- Post-grouping: London, Midland and Scottish Railway; British Railways (London Midland Region)

Key dates
- 1 April 1867: Opened as Dewsbury
- 2 June 1924: Name changed to Dewsbury Market Place
- 1 December 1930: Closed to passengers
- 1961: Closed completely
Location

Dewsbury railway station served the town of Dewsbury, West Yorkshire, England from 1867 to 1961 on the Dewsbury Branch Railway.

== History ==
The station opened as Dewsbury on 1 April 1867 by the Lancashire and Yorkshire Railway. The station's name was changed to Dewsbury Market Place on 2 June 1924. It closed to passengers on 1 December 1930 and to goods traffic in 1961. The station is now demolished.

Preceding station	Disused railways	Following station
Terminus	Lancashire and Yorkshire Railway; Dewsbury branch line	Thornhill; Line and station closed
