= Derwydd Road railway station =

Disused railway station in Derwydd, Carmarthenshire

Derwydd Road
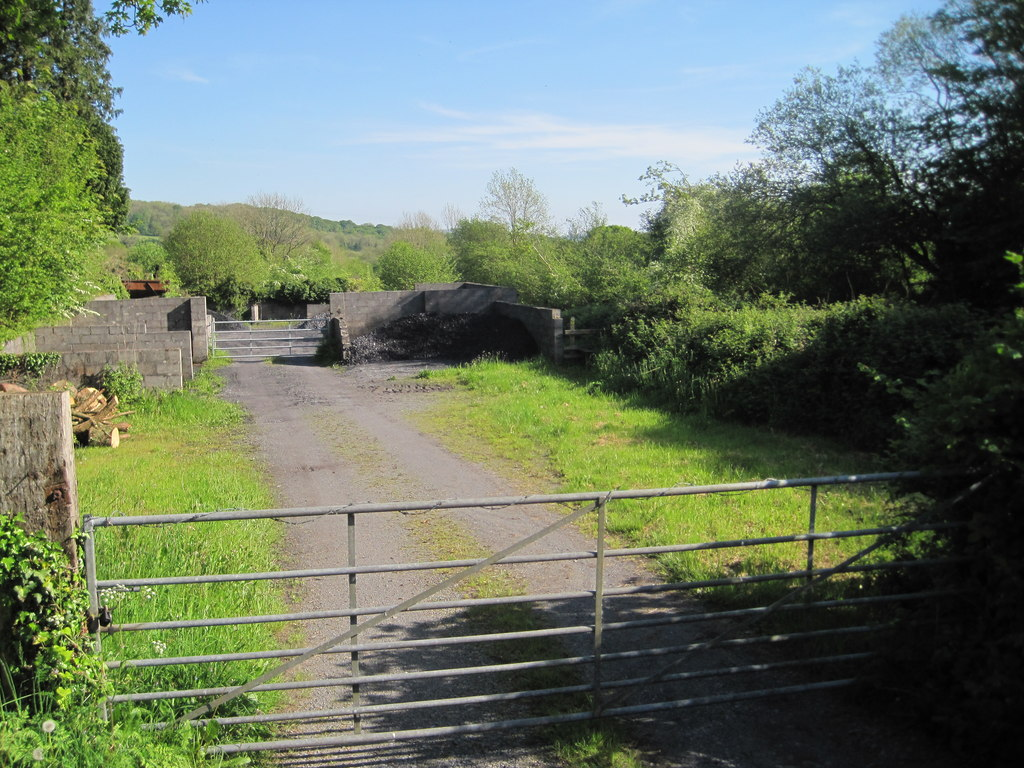
- The site of the station in 2014

General information
- Location: Derwydd, Glamorganshire; Wales
- Coordinates: 51.842°N 4.0044°W
- Grid reference: SN620178
- Platforms: 2

Other information
- Status: Disused

History
- Original company: Llanelly Railway
- Pre-grouping: Great Western Railway
- Post-grouping: Great Western Railway

Key dates
- 24 January 1857: Opened
- 3 May 1954: closed for passengers
- 1966: Closed completely
Location

Derwydd Road railway station served the hamlet of Derwydd, in the historical county of Glamorganshire, Wales, from 1857 to 1966 on the Llanelly Railway.

== History ==
The station was opened on 24 January 1857 by the Llanelly Railway. To the left of the level crossing was a siding that served a coal pit. The station closed to passengers on 3 May 1954 and closed to goods in 1966.

Preceding station	Disused railways	Following station
Ffairfach; Line and station open	Llanelly Railway	Llandybie; Line and station open
