= Drayton railway station (West Sussex) =

Disused railway station in Chichester, West Sussex

Drayton
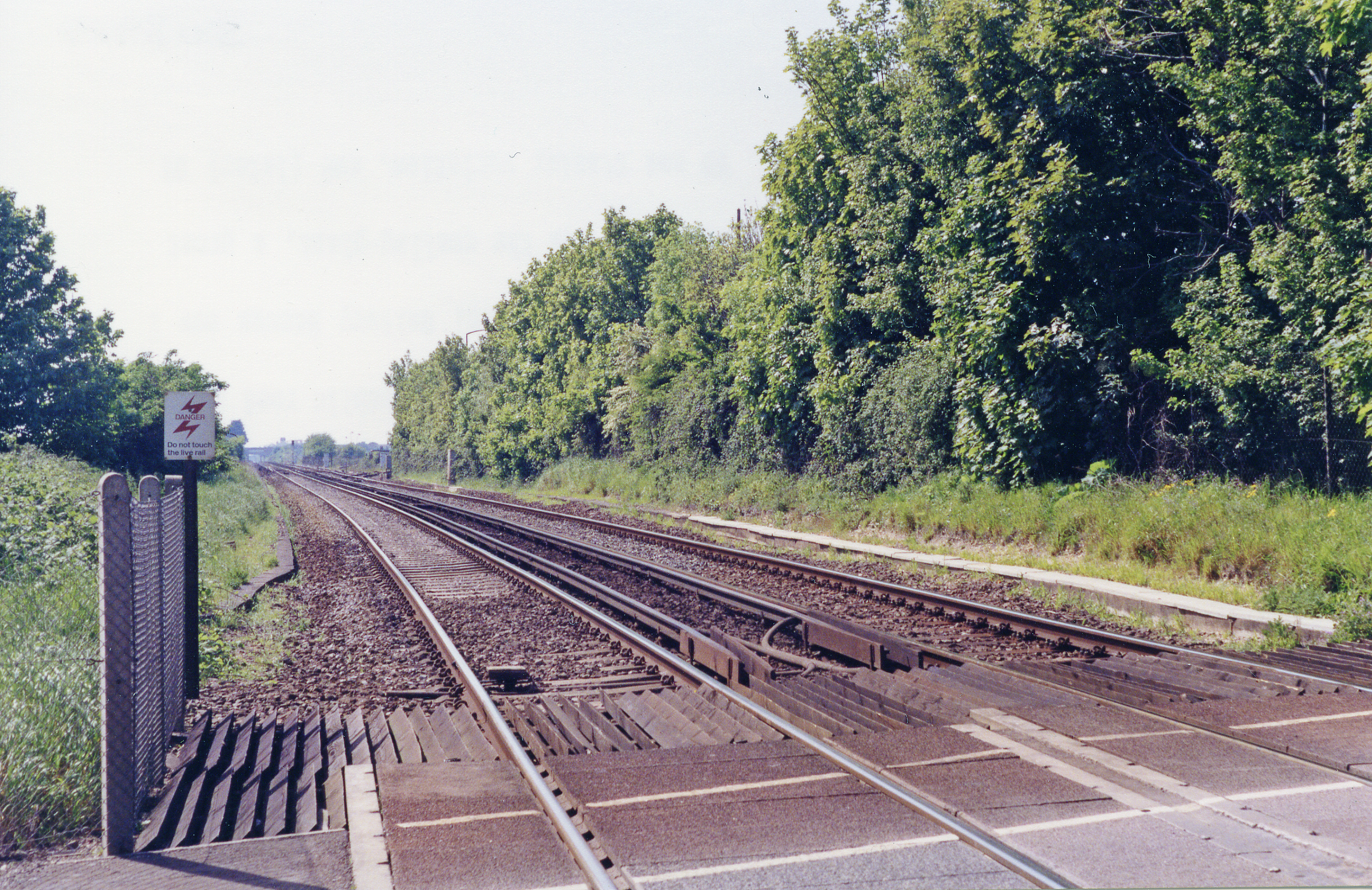
- The site of the station, looking west from the level crossing, in 1992

General information
- Location: Chichester, West Sussex; England
- Coordinates: 50.8323°N 0.7376°W
- Grid reference: SU890044
- Platforms: 2

Other information
- Status: Disused

History
- Original company: London, Brighton and South Coast Railway
- Pre-grouping: London, Brighton and South Coast Railway
- Post-grouping: Southern Railway

Key dates
- 8 June 1846: Opened
- 1 June 1930: Closed to passengers
- 9 September 1963: Closed to goods
Location

Drayton railway station co-served the city of Chichester, West Sussex, England, from 1846 to 1963 on the Brighton and Chichester Railway.

== History ==
The station was opened on 8 June 1846 by the London, Brighton and South Coast Railway. It closed to passengers on 1 June 1930 and closed to goods on 9 September 1963.

Preceding station	Disused railways	Following station
Woodgate; Line open, station closed	London, Brighton and South Coast Railway; Brighton and Chichester Railway	Chichester; Line and station open
