= Dunnington Halt railway station =

Disused railway station in North Yorkshire, England

Dunnington Halt

General information
- Location: Dunnington, North Yorkshire; England
- Coordinates: 53.9625°N 0.9894°W
- Grid reference: SE664523
- Platforms: 1

Other information
- Status: Disused

History
- Original company: Derwent Valley Light Railway

Key dates
- 21 July 1913: Opened
- 1 September 1926: Closed
Location

Dunnington Halt railway station served the village of Dunnington, North Yorkshire, England from 1913 to 1926 on the Derwent Valley Light Railway.

== History ==
The station opened 21 July 1913 by the North Eastern Railway. It closed to both passengers and goods traffic on 1 September 1926.

Preceding station	Historical railways	Following station
Murton Lane; Line and station closed	Derwent Valley Light Railway	Dunnington for Kexby; Line and station closed
