= Ecclesfield West railway station =

Disused railway station in South Yorkshire, England

Ecclesfield West
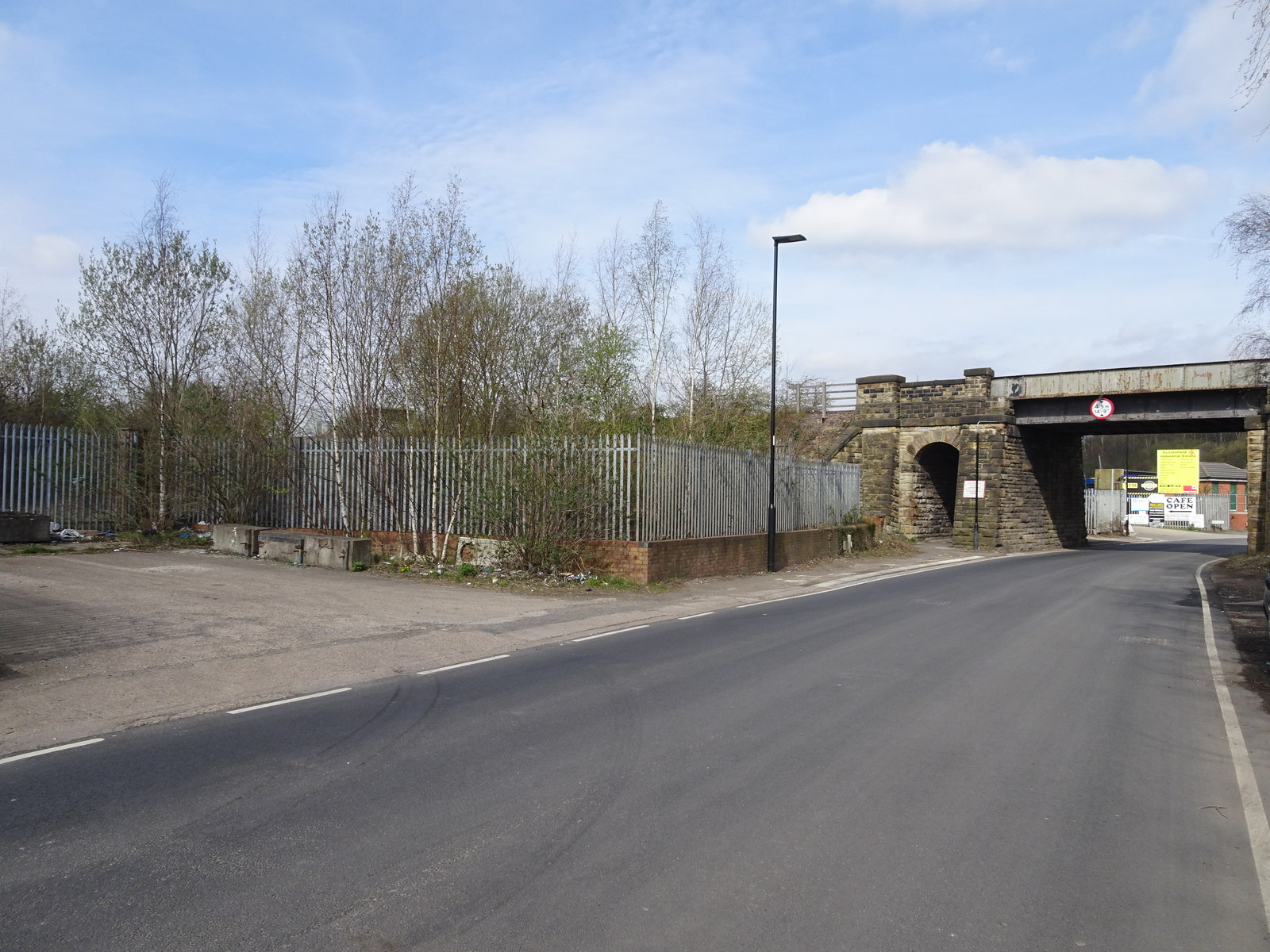
- Site of the former station (2019)

General information
- Location: Ecclesfield, City of Sheffield; England
- Coordinates: 53.44570°N 1.45536°W
- Grid reference: SK362944
- Platforms: 2

Other information
- Status: Disused

History
- Pre-grouping: Midland Railway

Key dates
- 1 July 1897: Opened as Ecclesfield
- 25 September 1950: Name changed to Ecclesfield West
- 6 November 1967: Closed
Location

Ecclesfield West railway station was a railway station in Sheffield, South Yorkshire, England. The station served the communities of Ecclesfield and Shiregreen and was situated on the Midland Railway, lying between Chapeltown and Brightside.

The station was opened in 1897 along with the line from Wincobank Junctions to Cudworth. It was initially known as Ecclesfield, but was renamed in 1950 to avoid confusion with the Ecclesfield East railway station. It closed in 1967, although it was later used for excursions until 1968.

Preceding station	Disused railways	Following station
Chapeltown; Line and station open	Midland Railway	Meadowhall; Line and station open
