= Ecclesfield East railway station =

Disused railway station in South Yorkshire, England

Ecclesfield East
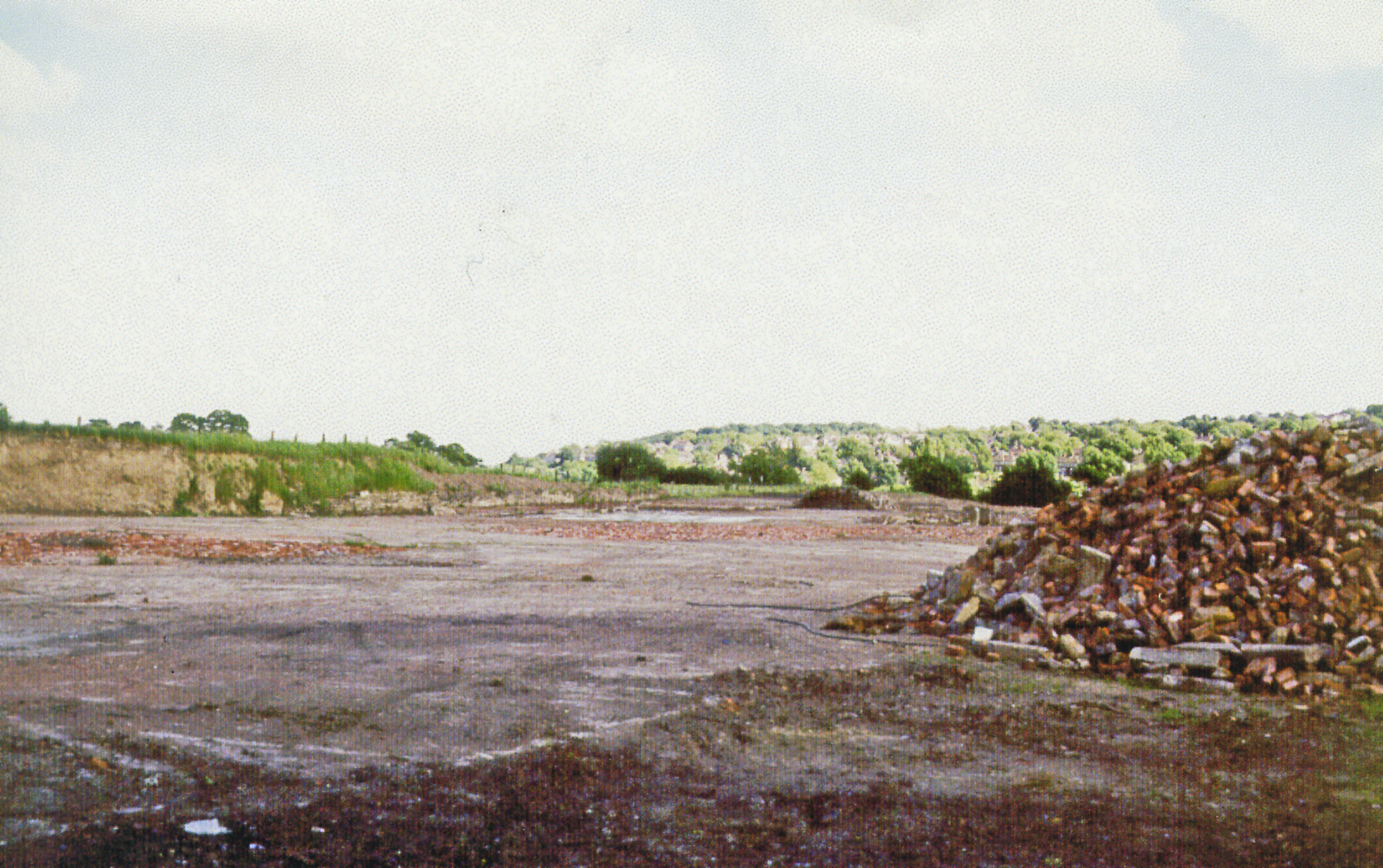
- Site of the former station in 1998

General information
- Location: Ecclesfield, City of Sheffield; England
- Coordinates: 53.44403°N 1.45080°W
- Grid reference: SK365942
- Platforms: 2

Other information
- Status: Disused

History
- Pre-grouping: South Yorkshire Railway

Key dates
- September 1854: Opened
- 1856: closed
- 1876: open
- 7 December 1953: Closed
Location

Ecclesfield East railway station was built by the South Yorkshire Railway on their "Blackburn Valley" line between Sheffield Wicker and Barnsley. The station was intended to serve the parish of Ecclesfield, near Sheffield, South Yorkshire, England, although it is some distance from the centre of the village.

The original "Ecclesfield" railway station was opened in September 1854 and closed just two years later. It was replaced by a new station opened in 1876, with buildings and staggered platforms linked by a footbridge and cost £1985 (including sidings and approach road). These buildings are identical to those at Meadowhall although it had staggered platforms. By this time the line was worked by the Manchester Sheffield and Lincolnshire Railway and the trains ran into their Sheffield Victoria Station. The station closed on 7 December 1953 and has been completely dismantled.

The nearby station of Ecclesfield West was initially also known as Ecclesfield.
