= Foryd railway station =

Former railway station in Conwy, Wales

Foryd
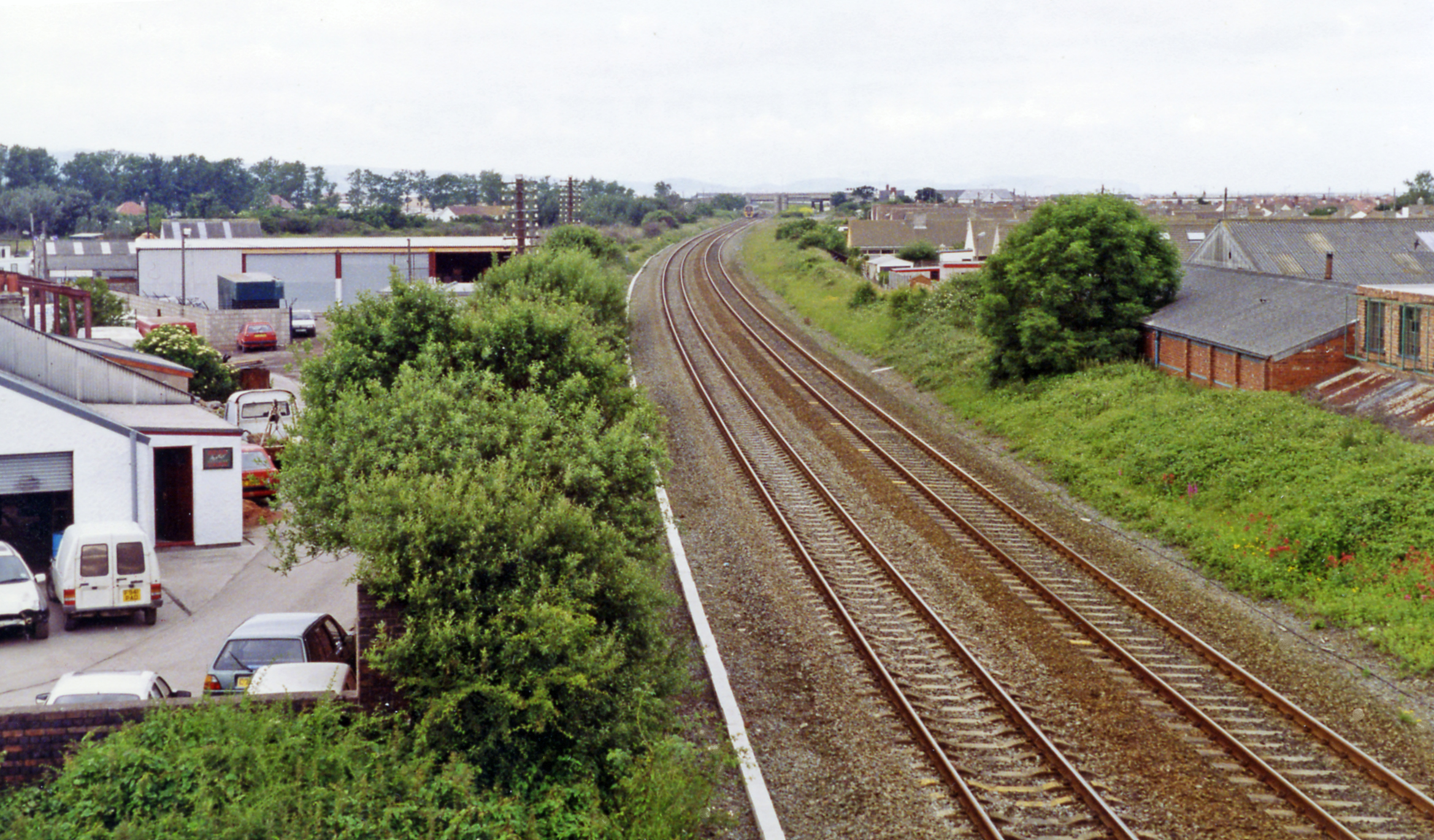
- Site of the station in 1993

General information
- Location: Kinmel Bay, Conwy County Borough (then Denbighshire); Wales
- Coordinates: 53.3073°N 3.5289°W
- Grid reference: SH981800
- Platforms: 2

Other information
- Status: Disused

History
- Original company: Vale of Clwyd Railway
- Pre-grouping: London and North Western Railway
- Post-grouping: London, Midland and Scottish Railway

Key dates
- 5 October 1858: Opened
- 20 April 1885: Closed
- 20 April 1885: New station opened
- 2 July 1917: Closed
- 1 July 1919: Reopened
- 5 January 1931: Closed
- 4 June 1938: Reopened as Kinmel Bay Halt
- 10 September 1938: Closed
- 19 June 1939: Reopened
- 2 September 1939: Closed
- 9 October 1948: Officially closed
Location

Foryd railway station (later known as Kinmel Bay Halt) was a railway station built to serve Kinmel Bay, Conwy County Borough (then in Denbighshire), Wales.

== History ==
The original Foryd station was opened on 5 October 1858 and was situated on the Denbigh, Ruthin and Corwen Railway, incorporating a station house designed by the Denbigh firm of Lloyd Williams and Underwood. This station was closed and a second station was opened, this time on the North Wales Coast Line, on 20 April 1885. where it remained until its closure in 1948. There were four tracks running through the station, two slow and two fast, but with only two platforms located adjacent to the slow tracks.

As was the case with many smaller stations of the time Foryd closed temporarily as a war economy measure between 2 July 1917 and 1 July 1919. The station continued to be used for only 12 years after this, closing again in 1931. It was then renamed to Kinmel Bay and experimentally re-opened during the summers of 1938 and 1939. Services never ran from there again and the station was permanently closed on 9 October 1948. Nothing remains of either the station buildings or platforms, although the busy North Wales Coast Line still runs through the site.

In 2009 there was much speculation that a new station was to be built in the area. January 2013 saw the North Wales Weekly News announce that £20 million had been earmarked for new stations in the UK and that funds would be applied for from this pot for the scheme. However just a month later the Taith Joint Board, the North Wales transport consortium, pulled out of seeking funding for the project, stating that the "necessary infrastructure improvements have not been carried out".

Preceding station	Historical railways	Following station
Rhyl; Line and station open	London and North Western Railway; North Wales Coast Line	Abergele and Pensarn; Line and station open
