= Lee-on-Solent Line =

Railway line in the United Kingdom

The Lee-on-the-Solent Line was a three mile long railway in Hampshire, England; it was built by the Lee-on-the-Solent Railway Company, promoted in association with a landowner's wish to develop a new seaside resort on his land.

It ran from Lee-on-the-Solent to a station at Brockhurst (Fort Brockhurst) on the Gosport line of the London and South Western Railway, but there was no through running. The company tried to operate with extremely low operating costs and ran into conflict with the operational requirements of the Board of Trade.

It opened its line in 1894, but was not commercially successful, and after some military usage before 1918, patronage declined as road passenger services increased in reliability. The line closed to passengers in 1931 and completely in 1935.

== History ==
=== Lee-on-the-Solent ===
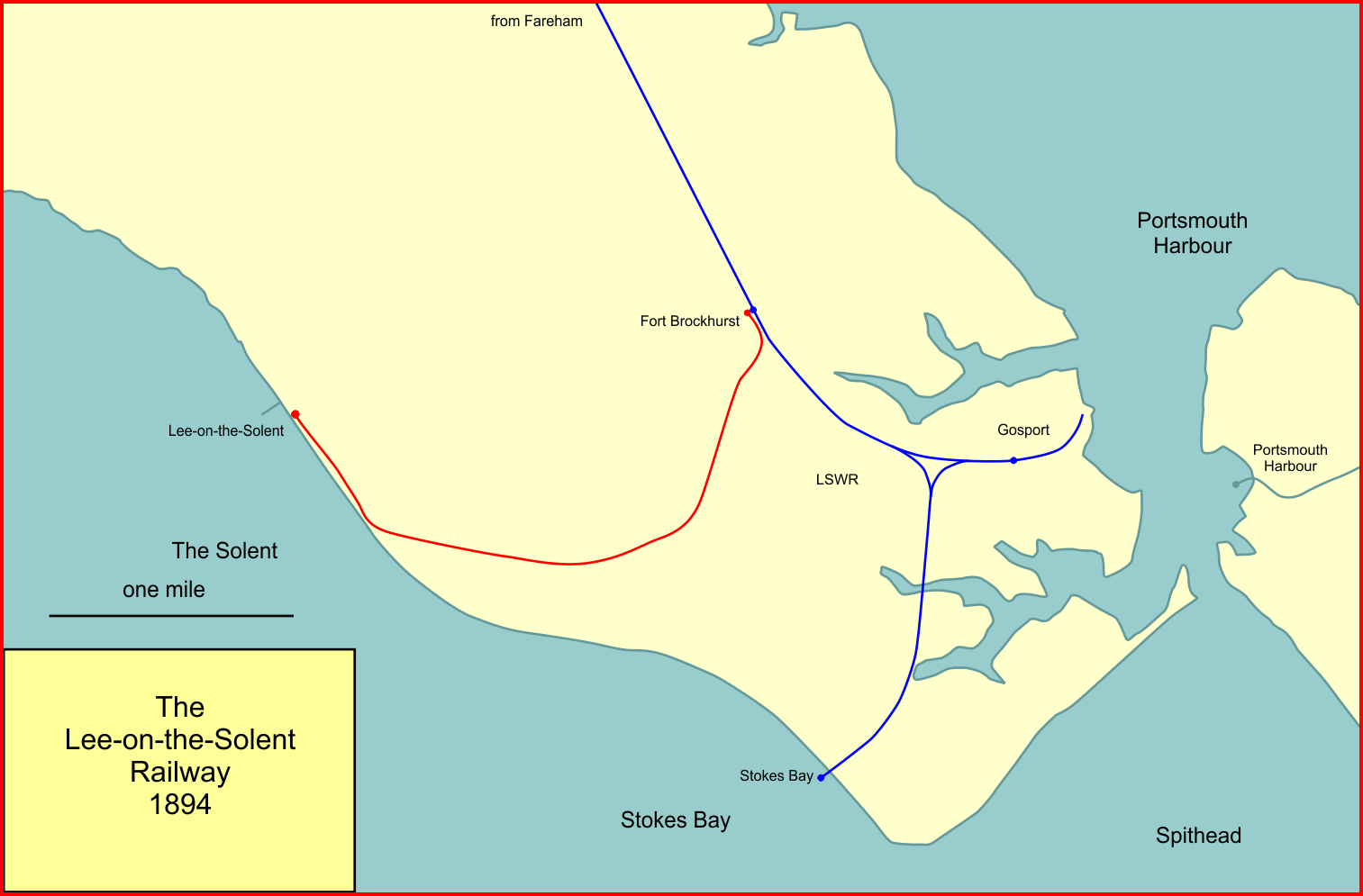
The Lee-on-the-Solent Railway 1894

Lee-on-the-Solent lies on the coast about four miles west of Gosport. In the middle decades of the nineteenth century, it was undeveloped, but Sir John C. Robinson owned the area. He saw the potential of developing the locality into a high class "watering place" similar to Bournemouth. With the help of one of his sons, he constructed Marine Parade, a broad thoroughfare more than a mile in length, together with an esplanade along the sea front. In addition, he started the development of a new housing scheme. A pier was essential to a seaside resort, he believed, and using his own money, he provided one, which opened in 1888. A steamer service made calls there in the summer months.

=== Lee-on-the-Solent Railway Company ===
A railway connection too was believed to be essential and the Lee-on-the-Solent Railway Company was established. The engineer R. H. Tigg estimated the expense of the enterprise as £22,052.

The company obtained a Board of Trade certificate, the Lee-on-the-Solent (Light) Railway Certificate 1890, to construct and operate the line on 5 July 1890. The Lee-on-the-Solent Railway was incorporated under the provisions of the Railway Construction Facilities Act 1864 as a light railway. The act enabled the construction of a railway without a special act of Parliament if landowners assented (among other conditions), and it appears that Robinson owned the relevant lands. The 3 1/8 mile line was to make a junction with the London and South Western Railway (LSWR) at Brockhurst, on the Gosport line. (Note: Brockhurst was renamed Fort Brockhurst in 1893.)

Board meetings appear to have been poorly focussed on the business of constructing an operational railway, and there may have been financial impropriety by directors. By early 1892 little construction work had been carried out. It is likely that share subscription was slow to be forthcoming, for in November 1892 it was indicated that Robinson was prepared to render the necessary financial assistance personally. This enabled work to proceed, and the construction was substantially complete by the spring of 1893.

=== Board of Trade approval ===
The consent of the Board of Trade was essential to passenger operation, and at this stage the company informed the board that "As the line is to be very light for some years after opening it is proposed to dispense with stations except at Lee terminus, where the station is half complete, and at Brockhurst where an adjoining platform will allow passengers to use the LSWR waiting room. It is proposed to work the railway with cars of the American type, having end platforms and low steps. The platforms to be only of a height sufficient for stock with steps." Through running to and from the LSWR was apparently not contemplated.

Four intermediate stopping places were to be provided, Elmore, Browndown, Privett and Pound Lane Crossing. Each of the three last named would have had a special type of level crossing, where the gates would close automatically after the passage of a train: this would avoid the expense of a crossing keeper. There would be a platform either side of the crossing, and trains would stop at the platform on the approach side of the crossing; the guard would open the gates across the road leaving the gates to be restored across the railway by the actuating mechanism.

Major Yorke of the Board of Trade made a site inspection on 15 July 1893. He reported that the line failed inspection on thirteen points, including that gauge ties were required on any curves of less than 15 chains radius; that there were no signals at all; that all sidings were supposed to be locked with a key on the train-staff, but the time of inspection the sidings were locked by a loose key; no facing point locks were provided and there were no check rails on 10 chain curves. The comment was also made that the line appeared to have been partly built outside the limits of deviation set and that the gradients were steeper than those originally proposed. Major Yorke sent a telegram to the Board of Trade stating that "I cannot recommend the opening as the works are incomplete".

By early 1894 the LSWR, the Lee-on-the-Solent Railway Company and the Board of Trade had been negotiating over the subject of through trains. Altered track arrangements at Fort Brockhurst would be needed and standard height platforms would be needed at the stopping places, and a porter and waiting shelter would have to be provided at the stations. The LSWR stood back from these discussions as far as possible. But the changes were made and on 28 March 1894 the Lee-on-Solent board informed the Railway Inspectorate that the line would be ready for re-inspection the next month. The plan was to open the line on 28 April 1894. They added that they intended to use the two engines belonging to the company, and that the two "American or tramcar-type carriages" had been fitted with continuous footboards at the same height as ordinary carriages. Platform heights had been raised to 3 feet and would be provided with lamps. If permission were given to using ordinary passenger stock in an emergency, an undertaking would be given not to stop at other than at Brockhurst and Lee.

The re-inspection, again by Major Yorke, took place on 7 May 1894. He found that buffers were absent at Brockhurst on a siding; that the new platform ramps were too steep; and that fencing was needed at the rear of Privett and Browndown stations. He reminded the company that a 10 mph maximum speed would operate as they had agreed. On that basis he gave provisional sanction given for the opening with a further re-inspection in June.

=== Opening ===
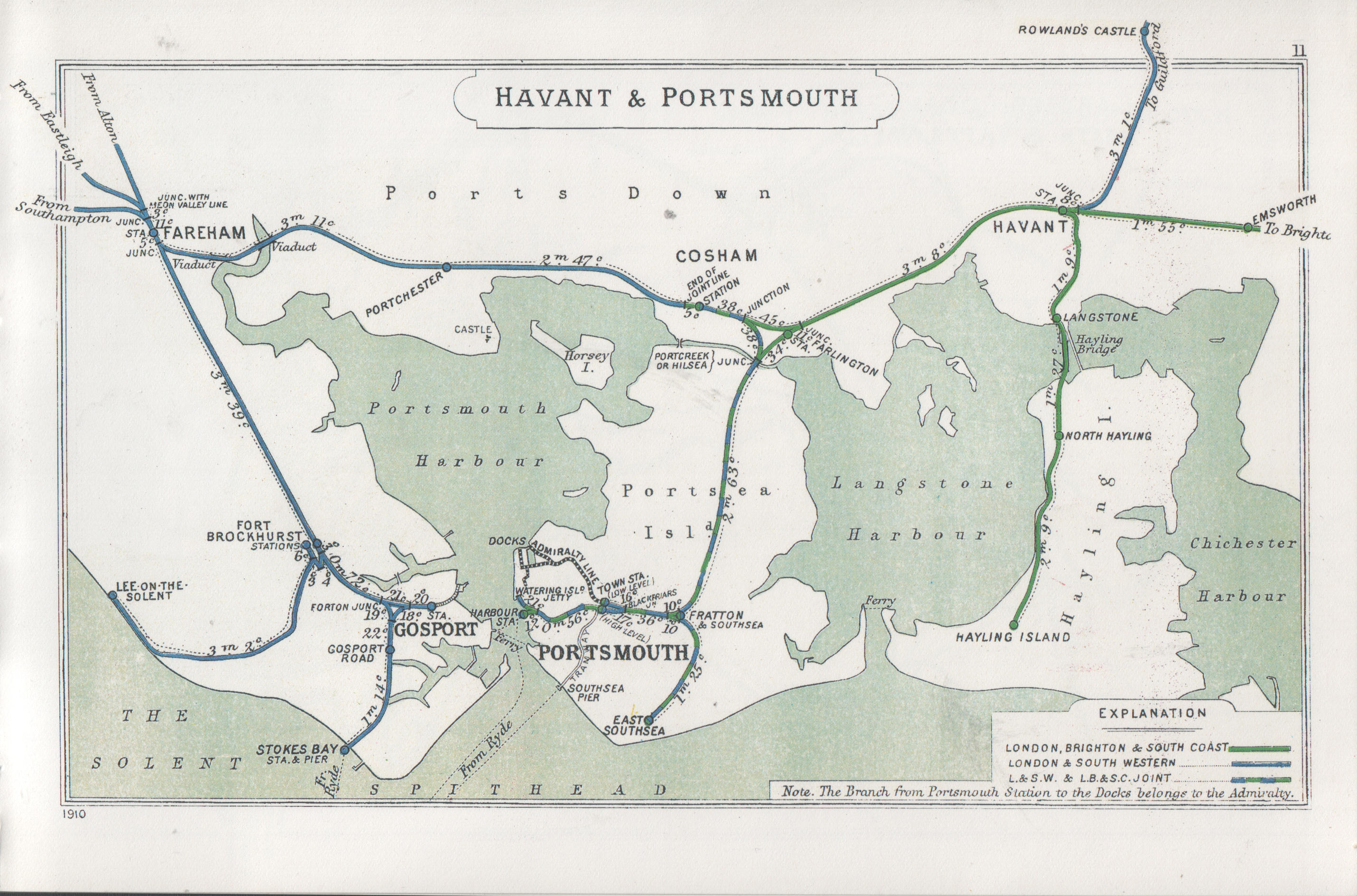
Railway clearing house map of lines around Gosport.

The company arranged a formal opening on 12 May 1894.

To operate the new service a locomotive was hired from the London and South Western Railway, notwithstanding the previous remark about the company's own engines. White states that a contractor worked the line until 1909. The initial service comprised eight trains each way daily with three on Sundays, all services calling by request at the two intermediate halts of Browndown and Privett. Later the timetable was changed to afford a slightly reduced number during the winter months. The fact that the first train did not leave Brockhurst until 10:15 indicates the type of patronage the line wished to attract.

From the time of opening up to and including 20 May 1894 total traffic receipts were £30 3s 5d. Wages amounted to £44 a month. Development of business was hampered by the need to change trains at Brockhurst: through running to the line was not possible because of the track layout there.

A re-inspection of the facilities took place on 5 November 1894, as promised when provisional opening sanction had been given. As before, the Inspecting Officer was Colonel Yorke (the change of title indicating promotion in the previous six months) who noted that the banks of the two bridges should be watched, due to doubts about their stability. There was agreement with the Board of Trade that the speed limit on the line might be raised to 20 mph.

In June 1895 the LSWR informed the company that both the locomotives they were hiring were worn out and no other suitable machines were available for the line's 8-ton axle loading. However it would be possible, the LSWR said, to operate the service with railmotors. The easy gradients and generous timings were unlikely to show up the deficiencies in pulling power these vehicles had exhibited elsewhere. To make such a change, the LSWR would need to take formal powers to work the line, which they did, effective from 26 July 1909.

The railmotor service started from 1 August 1895; the vehicle concerned was No. 9 of the H13 class, sister machine No. 10 joining in from 1 September 1909.

The train service was now ten trains each way daily on weekdays, with five on Sundays in July only. A new halt was also opened at Elmore on 11 April 1910. The railmotors lasted in use until 1915, when the working reverted to locomotive haulage and push-and-pull trains, which remained the pattern for most of the remaining life of the line.

During the First World War traffic actually increased on account of military construction work at Lee-on-the-Solent.

== Grouping of the railways ==
In 1923 most of the railways of Great Britain were transferred into the ownership of one or other of four new large companies, following the Railways Act 1921, in a process known as the grouping. The Lee-on-the-Solent company, and the LSWR, would transfer into the Southern Railway. The finances of the Lee concern had to be resolved, as a large financial deficit had accumulated. In 1908, expenditure of £1,100 had been remunerated with income of £700 only.

The asset value of the line was £4,400 was set against debts of some £14,600. The Southern Railway was reluctant to acquire a concern with a negative value. Bonavia puts it more strongly: "The Lee-on[-the]-Solent Railway was bankrupt and the Southern fought right up to the Court of Appeal against being forced to assume its liabilities." The matter was decided by arbitration at an Amalgamation Tribunal on 4 January 1923, which determined that the Southern should be responsible and an appeal by the Southern a few months later against the decision was dismissed. The last board meeting of the Lee Company was held on 1 February 1923.

== Decline from 1923 ==
Bus competition increased rapidly in the late 1920s, and the line was unable to survive: the three intermediate stations closed on 1 May 1930; passenger services ceased completely on 1 January 1931, and the line closed entirely on 30 September 1935. Six men and a dog travelled on the last train.

== Locations ==
- Lee-on-the-Solent; opened 12 May 1894; closed 31 August 1914; reopened 1 October 1914; closed 1 January 1931;
- Elmore; opened 11 April 1910; closed 31 August 1914; reopened 1 October 1914; closed 1 May 1930;
- Browndown; opened 12 May 1894; closed 31 August 1914; reopened 1 October 1914; closed 1 May 1930;
- Privett; opened 12 May 1894; renamed Fort Gomer Halt 1909; closed 31 August 1914; reopened 1 October 1914; closed 1 May 1930;
- Brockhurst; LSWR station; opened November 1865; renamed Fort Brockhurst 23 November 1893; closed 8 June 1953.
