= Menthorpe =

Hamlet in North Yorkshire, England

Coordinates: 53.803°N 0.938°W

- Location within North Yorkshire
- OS grid reference: SE701345
- Civil parish: North Duffield
- Unitary authority: North Yorkshire
- Ceremonial county: North Yorkshire
- Region: Yorkshire and the Humber
- Country: England
- Sovereign state: United Kingdom
- Post town: SELBY
- Postcode district: YO8
- Dialling code: 01757
- Police: North Yorkshire
- Fire: North Yorkshire
- Ambulance: Yorkshire
- UK Parliament: Selby

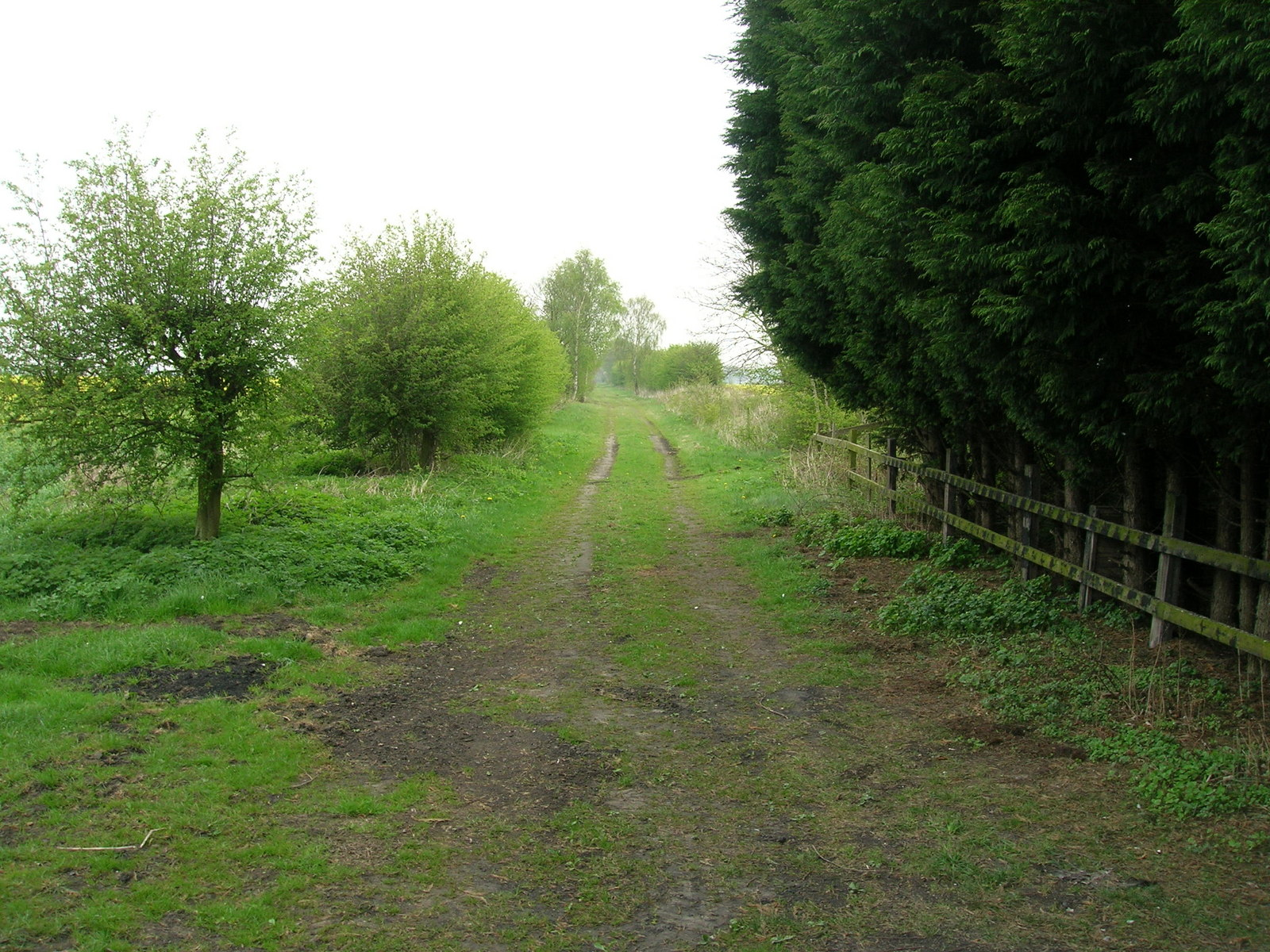
Dismantled railway track, Menthorpe Gate

Menthorpe is a hamlet in the civil parish of North Duffield in North Yorkshire, England. It lies on the west bank of the River Derwent, 6 miles (10 km) east of Selby.

Menthorpe Ings, north of the hamlet, is a flood meadow which is part of the Derwent Ings Site of Special Scientific Interest, internationally important for its concentration of water-fowl in winter.

== History ==
The toponym is of Old Norse origin, and means "the hamlet of a man called Menni or Menja".

In the Middle Ages the village was in the Ouse and Derwent wapentake of the East Riding of Yorkshire. Most of Menthorpe was in the large ancient parish of Hemingbrough, and formed a township of that parish with the hamlet of Bowthorpe, 1 mile (1.6 km) to the south. An area of Menthorpe between the village and Bowthorpe was a detached part of Skipwith parish. In 1866 the township of Menthorpe with Bowthorpe became a separate civil parish, and the detached part of Skipwith parish became part of North Duffield civil parish. In 1935 the civil parish of Menthorpe with Bowthorpe was abolished and merged with the parish of North Duffield.

From the Middle Ages until the 1930s a ferry operated across the Derwent to Breighton. Between 1853 and 1953 the hamlet was served by Menthorpe Gate railway station on the Selby to Driffield Line.

In 1974 Menthorpe was transferred from the East Riding to the new county of North Yorkshire. From 1974 to 2023 it was part of the Selby District, it is now administered by the unitary North Yorkshire Council.
