= Foggathorpe =

Village and civil parish in the East Riding of Yorkshire, England

Coordinates: 53.829054°N 0.854387°W

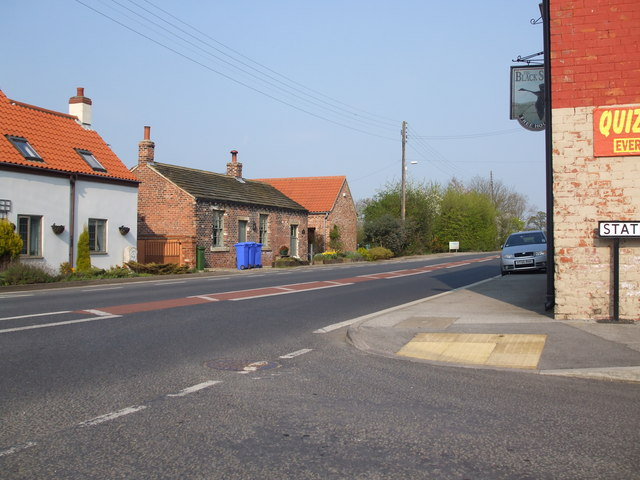
- Foggathorpe village on the A163, April 2009

- Location within the East Riding of Yorkshire
- Population: 313 (2011 census)
- OS grid reference: SE755375
  - London: 160 mi (260 km) S
- Civil parish: Foggathorpe
- Unitary authority: East Riding of Yorkshire
- Ceremonial county: East Riding of Yorkshire
- Region: Yorkshire and the Humber
- Country: England
- Sovereign state: United Kingdom
- Post town: SELBY
- Postcode district: YO8
- Dialling code: 01757
- Police: Humberside
- Fire: Humberside
- Ambulance: Yorkshire
- UK Parliament: Goole and Pocklington

Foggathorpe is a village and civil parish on the A163 road in the East Riding of Yorkshire, England. The village is situated approximately 9 miles (14 km) east of Selby and 8 miles (13 km) west of Market Weighton.

The civil parish is formed by the villages of Foggathorpe and Laytham and the hamlets of Harlthorpe and Gribthorpe. According to the 2011 UK Census, Foggathorpe parish had a population of 313, an increase on the 2001 UK Census figure of 233.

There are about 35 houses in the centre of the village, a post office in Station Road, a public house called the Black Swan, a nearby Hoseasons Holiday Park at Yellowtop Country Park, and a boarding kennel and cattery on the A163 main road.

== History ==
The name Foggathorpe derives from the personal name Fulcward and the Old Norse þorp meaning 'secondary settlement'.

In 1823 Baine's Directory recorded Foggathorpe as in the parish of Bubwith and the Wapentake of Harthill. The population was 137, with occupations including three farmers, a blacksmith, a wheelwright, a grocer, and a shoemaker. A carrier operated between the village and York and Howden once a week. At the time parcels of land were let to labourers for 'cow-gates' which resulted in a reduction in poor rates.

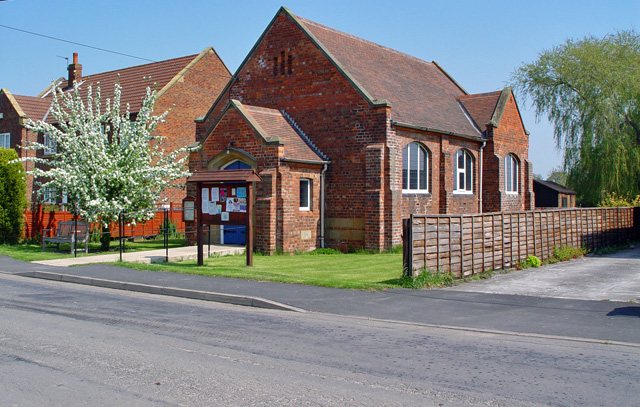
Methodist Chapel

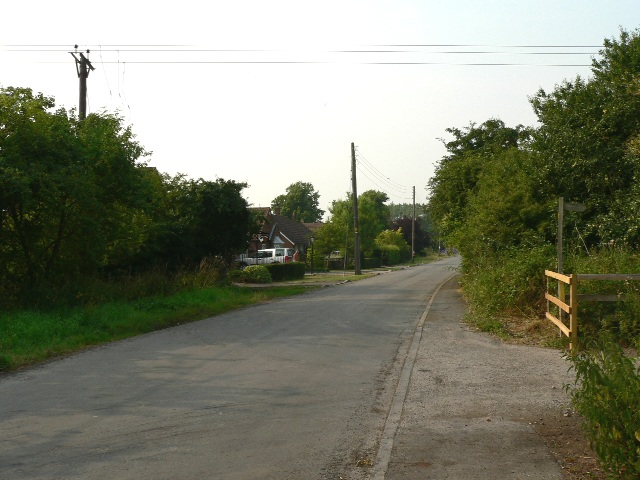
Looking towards Foggathorpe from the former railway station

In 1892, Bulmer's History and Directory of East Yorkshire describes Foggathorpe as "a township containing 1,320 acres (5.3 km^{2}) of land lying on the bank of the Foulness river". It was described as a small village with a population of 113 in 1881, rising to 131 in 1891. The village had a station (on the Selby and Market Weighton branch railway), and a Wesleyan chapel built in 1803 which was also used as a school for 41 children. Bulmer states that the village is called "Fulcathorpe" in the Domesday Book and that it was given by William I to his standard-bearer, Gilbert Tison. Later the village belonged to the Aikroyds, one of whom was buried in the chancel of Bubwith church in 1673. The Aikroyds' old mansion was taken down in 1743, and a farmhouse erected on the site, though the mansion's moat remained.

== Geography ==
Foggathorpe gives its name to the local soil, which is dominated by poorly drained, clayey soils of the Foggathorpe series. Soils of both the Foggathorpe 1 Association and the Foggathorpe 2 Association are described as slowly permeable seasonally waterlogged stoneless clayey and fine loamy over clayey soils; the poor drainage and seasonal waterlogging creates conditions conducive to rapid surface runoff. The clay has its origins in glacial lakes.

== Transport ==
Foggathorpe had its own railway station from 1853 to 1954 on the Selby to Driffield Line, and the site of the dismantled railway track runs to the south of the village. The nearest train service is now about ten minutes' drive away at Howden station, from which one can travel to London Kings Cross. A bus service through Foggathorpe transports children to local schools.

== See also ==
- Listed buildings in Foggathorpe
