= Duffield =

Duffield(s) may refer to:

== England ==
- Duffield, Derbyshire
  - Duffield Castle, Derbyshire, a Norman castle in Duffield, Derbyshire
- Duffield Frith, in medieval times an area of Derbyshire
- North Duffield, a village in North Yorkshire
- South Duffield, a village in North Yorkshire

== Other places ==
- Duffield, Alberta, a hamlet
- Duffield, Michigan
- Duffield railway station, in Duffield, Derbyshire
- Duffield, Virginia
- Duffields, West Virginia
  - Duffields station, in Duffields, West Virginia
- Fort Duffield, an American Civil War fort in Kentucky
- Duffield Street, in Brooklyn, New York with abolitionist ties

== See also ==
- Duffield (surname)
- Duffield Castle (disambiguation)
