= Middleton on the Wolds =

Village and civil parish in the East Riding of Yorkshire, England

Coordinates: 53°55′59″N 0°33′45″W

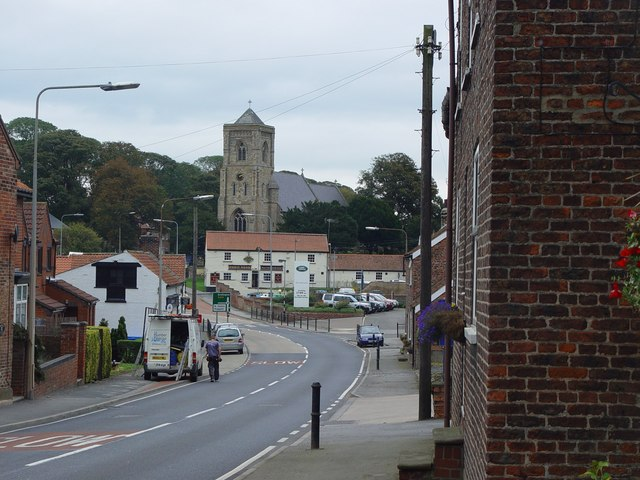
- Front street, Middleton on the Wolds

- Location within the East Riding of Yorkshire
- Population: 825 (2011 census)
- OS grid reference: SE944495
  - London: 170 mi (270 km) S
- Civil parish: Middleton
- Unitary authority: East Riding of Yorkshire
- Ceremonial county: East Riding of Yorkshire
- Region: Yorkshire and the Humber
- Country: England
- Sovereign state: United Kingdom
- Post town: DRIFFIELD
- Postcode district: YO25
- Dialling code: 01377
- Police: Humberside
- Fire: Humberside
- Ambulance: Yorkshire
- UK Parliament: Beverley and Holderness

Middleton on the Wolds is a village and civil parish on the Yorkshire Wolds in the East Riding of Yorkshire, England. It is situated on the A614 road midway between Driffield and Market Weighton.

According to the 2011 UK census, Middleton parish had a population of 825, an increase on the 2001 UK census figure of 774.

== History ==
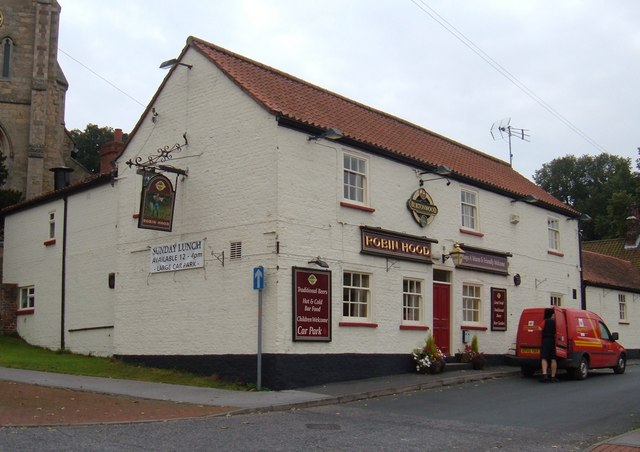
The Robin Hood Public house

Middleton on the Wolds was served by Middleton-on-the-Wolds railway station on the Selby to Driffield Line between 1890 and 1954.

St Andrew's Church, Middleton-on-the-Wolds was designated a Grade II* listed building in 1966 and is now recorded in the National Heritage List for England, maintained by Historic England.

The Kiplingcotes Derby finish post is within the parish of Middleton on the Wolds, now believed to be the oldest known horse race in England dating back to at least 1519.

Notable People

- Count Robert of Mortain: Recorded in the Domesday Book as a primary tenant-in-chief of the manors in Middleton in 1086.
- The Earls of Burlington and the Boyles: Held the town of Middleton and large portions of its surrounding lands prior to modern enclosure, notably involved with the early establishment of the nearby Kiplingcotes-associated traditions.
- Dr. Ernest Clements (1878–1961): A prominent local physician originally from Ireland who ran the village medical practice from 1906 onward, heavily contributing to the social and athletic fabric of village life
- Geoff Wisher (1939- 2024): Born in Hull on 13th February 1939. He moved with his family to Middleton on the Wolds in 1977. Geoff worked in the Planning Department of Beverley Borough Council up to his retirement in 1995.
  While in Middleton he set up a local history group with his wife Pauline and produced many Heritage sheets covering the history of the village from the very early days. Much of the detail was later published in the monthly 'Middleton Messenger'. At one point he was elected the Chairperson of the local Parish Council.

== Governance ==
The civil parish was in the East Yorkshire parliamentary constituency until the 2010 general election, when it was transferred to the constituency of Beverley and Holderness.

On 1 April 1935 the parish was renamed from "Middleton on the Wolds" to "Middleton".

== See also ==
- Listed buildings in Middleton on the Wolds
