= Harlthorpe =

Hamlet in the East Riding of Yorkshire, England

Coordinates: 53.827326°N 0.874976°W

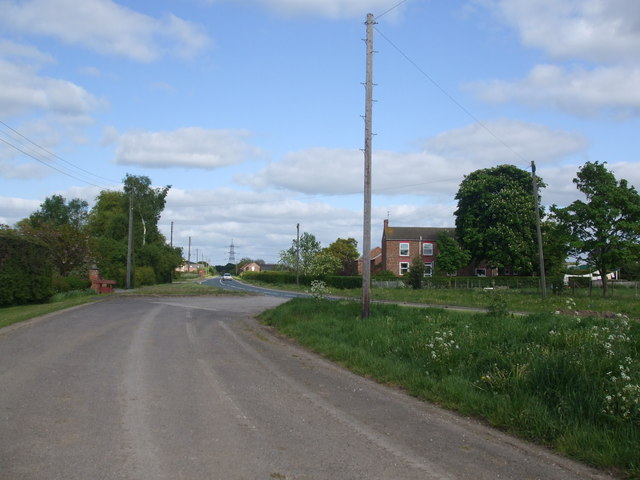

- Location within the East Riding of Yorkshire
- OS grid reference: SE741373
  - London: 160 mi (260 km) S
- Civil parish: Foggathorpe
- Unitary authority: East Riding of Yorkshire
- Ceremonial county: East Riding of Yorkshire
- Region: Yorkshire and the Humber
- Country: England
- Sovereign state: United Kingdom
- Post town: SELBY
- Postcode district: YO8
- Dialling code: 01757
- Police: Humberside
- Fire: Humberside
- Ambulance: Yorkshire
- UK Parliament: Goole and Pocklington

Harlthorpe is a hamlet and former civil parish, now in the parish of Foggathorpe, in the East Riding of Yorkshire, England. It is situated approximately 8 miles (13 km) north-east of Selby town centre and 6 miles (9.7 km) north of Howden town centre. It lies on the A163 road. In 1931 the parish had a population of 53.

The name Harlthorpe derives from the Old Norse Herelþorp meaning 'Herel's secondary settlement'.

In 1823 Harlthorpe (then Harlethorpe), was in the parish of Bubwith and the Wapentake of Harthill. Population at the time was 93, with occupations including six farmers, a blacksmith, and a shoemaker.

Harlthorpe was formerly a township in the parish of Bubwith, from 1866 Harlthorpe was a civil parish in its own right, on 1 April 1935 the parish was abolished and merged with Foggathorpe.
