= Dudfield =

Dudfield is an English surname. Notable people with the surname include:

- Harry Dudfield (1912–1987), New Zealand politician
- Lawrie Dudfield (born 1980), English footballer
- Tim Dudfield, Australian dance music producer and DJ

== See also ==
- Duffield (surname)
