= Southburn =

Hamlet in the East Riding of Yorkshire, England

Coordinates: 53.975749°N 0.492430°W

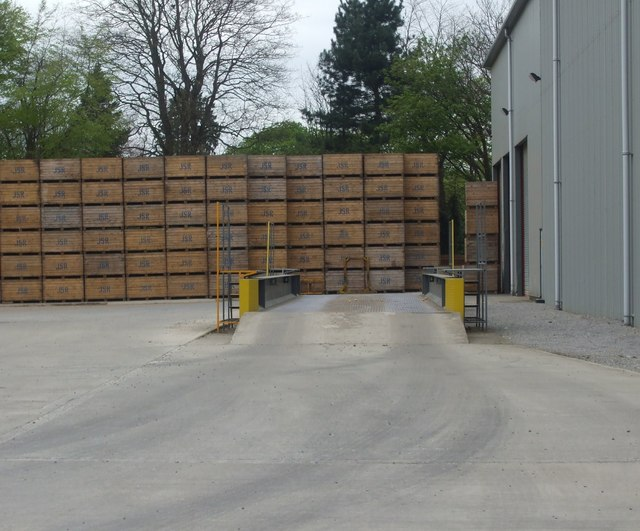

- Location within the East Riding of Yorkshire
- OS grid reference: SE989543
- Civil parish: Kirkburn
- Unitary authority: East Riding of Yorkshire
- Ceremonial county: East Riding of Yorkshire
- Region: Yorkshire and the Humber
- Country: England
- Sovereign state: United Kingdom
- Post town: DRIFFIELD
- Postcode district: YO25
- Dialling code: 01377
- Police: Humberside
- Fire: Humberside
- Ambulance: Yorkshire
- UK Parliament: Bridlington and The Wolds

Southburn is a hamlet and former civil parish, now in the parish of Kirkburn, in the East Riding of Yorkshire, England. It is situated in the Yorkshire Wolds just south of the A164 road, approximately 3 miles (4.8 km) south-west of Driffield and 2.5 miles (4 km) north-west of Hutton Cranswick. In 1931 the parish had a population of 116.

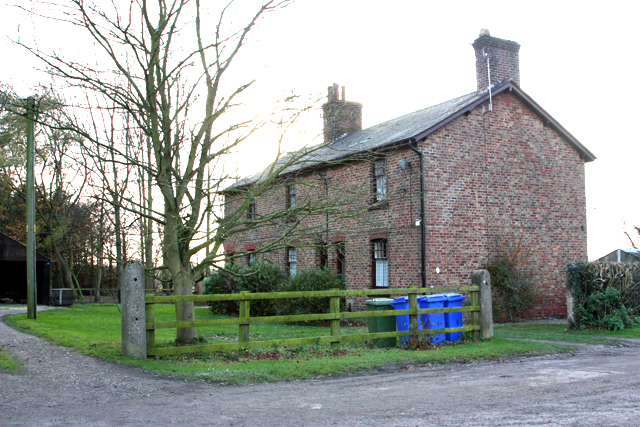
Station cottages, Southburn

From 1890 until 1954 Southburn was served by Southburn railway station on the Selby to Driffield Line.

== Governance ==
Southburn was formerly a township in the parish of Kirkburn. In 1866 it became a civil parish and on 1 April 1935 the parish was abolished to form Kirkburn.

== Murder of Shane Gilmer ==
Humberside Police were alerted to a disturbance at about 9.20 pm on Friday 12 January 2018. On entering the property at 9.58 pm officers found Mr Gilmer with serious injuries to his right arm and a crossbow wound to his torso. His pregnant girlfriend, Laura Sugden, was found at a neighbour's house with injuries to her head and neck. Mr Gilmer died at 0.17 am on Saturday 13 January 2018 in Hull Royal Infirmary. The Police stated on the Friday evening that a crossbow had been found at the property of Mr Gilmer and Ms Sugden. Humberside Police issued an arrest warrant for Anthony Lawrence, who was also known as Tony Howarth and lived next door to Mr Gilmer and Ms Sugden. On Monday 15 January 2018 the police stated they had found a body during the hunt for Anthony Lawrence.
