= Laytham =

Village in the East Riding of Yorkshire, England

Coordinates: 53.847163°N 0.863469°W

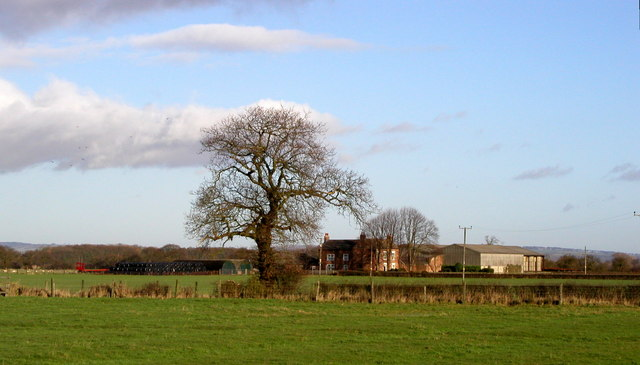
- View of farm at Laytham

- Location within the East Riding of Yorkshire
- OS grid reference: SE748395
  - London: 165 mi (266 km) S
- Civil parish: Foggathorpe
- Unitary authority: East Riding of Yorkshire
- Ceremonial county: East Riding of Yorkshire
- Region: Yorkshire and the Humber
- Country: England
- Sovereign state: United Kingdom
- Post town: YORK
- Postcode district: YO42
- Dialling code: 01757
- Police: Humberside
- Fire: Humberside
- Ambulance: Yorkshire
- UK Parliament: Goole and Pocklington

Laytham is a village and former civil parish, now in the parish of Foggathorpe, in the East Riding of Yorkshire, England. It is situated approximately 6 miles (9.7 km) north of Howden town centre and 3 miles (5 km) west of Holme-on-Spalding-Moor. In 1931 the parish had a population of 63.

There is currently 1 working farm and approximately 10 houses. Some are being built on an old farm.

== History ==
The name Laytham derives from the plural form of the Old Norse hlaða meaning 'barn'.

In 1823, Laytham was in the parish of Aughton and the Wapentake of Harthill. Occupations included seven farmers, with a gentleman in residence.

Laytham was formerly a township in the parish of Aughton, from 1866 Laytham was a civil parish in its own right, on 1 April 1935 the parish was abolished and merged with Foggathorpe.
