= Gribthorpe =

Hamlet in the East Riding of Yorkshire, England

Coordinates: 53.810599°N 0.846690°W

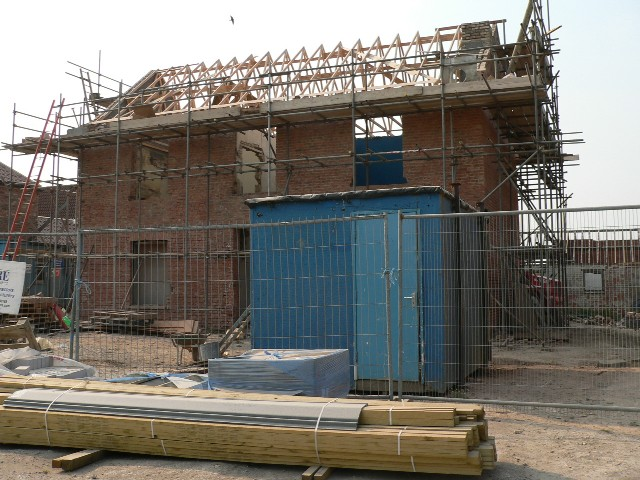
- A barn conversion in Gribthorpe

- Location within the East Riding of Yorkshire
- OS grid reference: SE760355
  - London: 160 mi (260 km) S
- Civil parish: Foggathorpe
- Unitary authority: East Riding of Yorkshire
- Ceremonial county: East Riding of Yorkshire
- Region: Yorkshire and the Humber
- Country: England
- Sovereign state: United Kingdom
- Post town: GOOLE
- Postcode district: DN14
- Dialling code: 01757
- Police: Humberside
- Fire: Humberside
- Ambulance: Yorkshire
- UK Parliament: Goole and Pocklington

Gribthorpe is a hamlet in the civil parish of Foggathorpe, in the East Riding of Yorkshire, England. It is situated approximately 8 miles (13 km) north-east of Selby and 5 miles (8 km) north of Howden.

In 1823, Gribthorpe (also known as Gripthorpe), was in the civil parish of Bubwith and the Wapentake of Harthill. Population at the time, including the nearby hamlet of Willitoft, was 145, with occupations including four farmers. Gribthorpe was formerly a township in the parish of Bubwith, in 1866 Gribthorpe became a separate civil parish, on 1 April 1935 the parish was abolished and merged with Foggathorpe. In 1931 the parish had a population of 23.

The name Gribthorpe derives from the Old Norse Gripþorp meaning 'Grip's secondary settlement'.
