= Kirkburn =

Village and civil parish in the East Riding of Yorkshire, England

Coordinates: 53°58′59″N 0°30′18″W

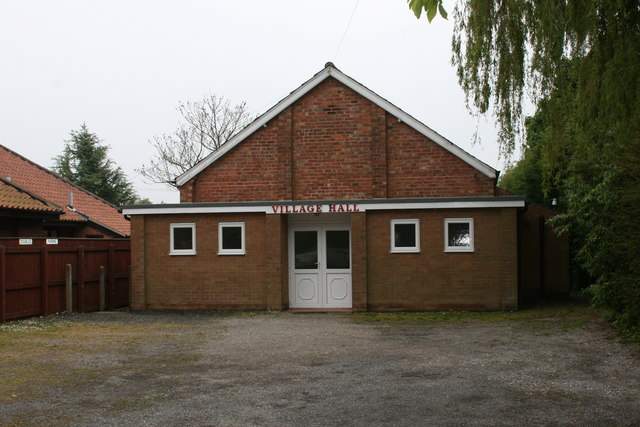
- Kirkburn Village Hall

- Location within the East Riding of Yorkshire
- Population: 903 (2011 census)
- OS grid reference: SE981551
  - London: 170 mi (270 km) S
- Civil parish: Kirkburn
- Unitary authority: East Riding of Yorkshire
- Ceremonial county: East Riding of Yorkshire
- Region: Yorkshire and the Humber
- Country: England
- Sovereign state: United Kingdom
- Post town: DRIFFIELD
- Postcode district: YO25
- Dialling code: 01377
- Police: Humberside
- Fire: Humberside
- Ambulance: Yorkshire
- UK Parliament: Bridlington and The Wolds
- Website: www.kirkburnparishcouncil.org

Kirkburn is a small village and civil parish in the East Riding of Yorkshire, England. It is situated about 3 miles (5 km) south-west of Driffield town centre and is on the A614 road.

The civil parish is formed by the village of Kirkburn and the hamlets of Eastburn, Kelleythorpe and Southburn. According to the 2011 UK census, Kirkburn parish had a population of 903, an increase on the 2001 UK census figure of 492.

== History ==
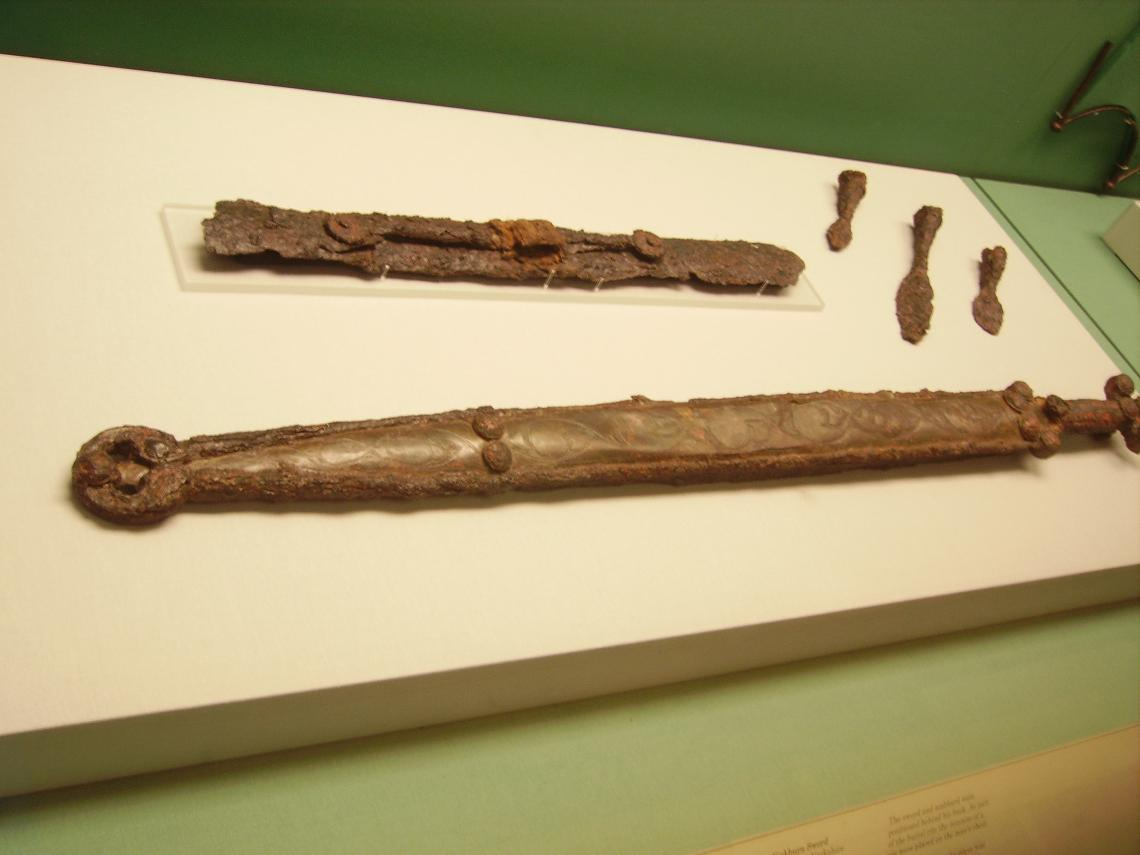
The Kirkburn Sword, kept in the British Museum.

The village was originally known as Westburn at the time of the Domesday Book and the name was changed to Kirkburn after the building of St Mary's Church in the village between 1130 and 1155. "Kirk" means "church". The church was restored in the 19th century by John Loughborough Pearson and George Edmund Street. In 1966 the church was designated a Grade I listed building and it is now recorded in the National Heritage List for England and maintained by Historic England. It is on the Sykes Churches Trail devised by the East Yorkshire Churches Group.

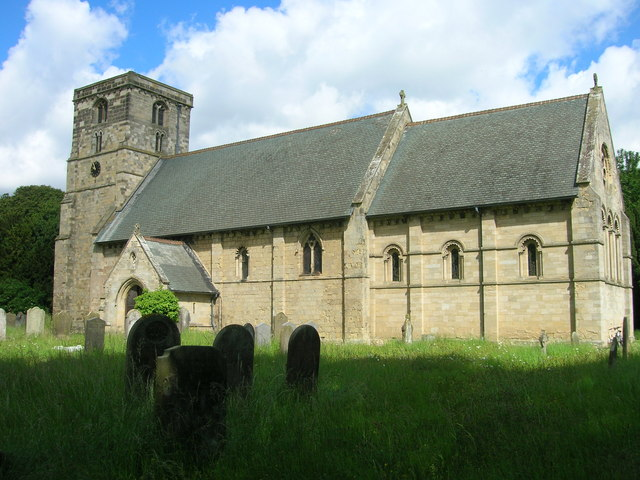
St Mary's Church

An important archaeological relic was found in 1987 during the excavation of a nearby Iron Age grave and dated to the 3rd century BC. The Kirkburn Sword, as it became known, is described by the British Museum as "probably the finest Iron Age sword in Europe". Its handle is made up of 37 pieces of iron, bronze and horn and decorated with red glass. Its scabbard is made of iron and polished bronze, decorated with a scroll pattern in La Tène style, with red glass studs and insets. Also in the British Museum are Celtic Iron Age finds from a chariot burial discovered only 11 yards (10 m) away from the man who was buried with the Kirkburn sword. They include an ornately decorated pair of linchpins from the axle.

From 1890 until 1954 Kirkburn was served by Southburn railway station on the Selby to Driffield Line.

== See also ==
- Kirkburn Burial
- Listed buildings in Kirkburn
