= Duffield Castle =

Duffield Castle may refer to:

- Duffield Castle, Derbyshire, a Norman castle in Duffield, Derbyshire
- Duffield Castle, North Yorkshire, in North Duffield, North Yorkshire

== See also ==
- Duffield (disambiguation)
