= Cliffe, Selby =

Village and civil parish in North Yorkshire, England

Coordinates: 53°46′56″N 0°59′45″W

Cliffe
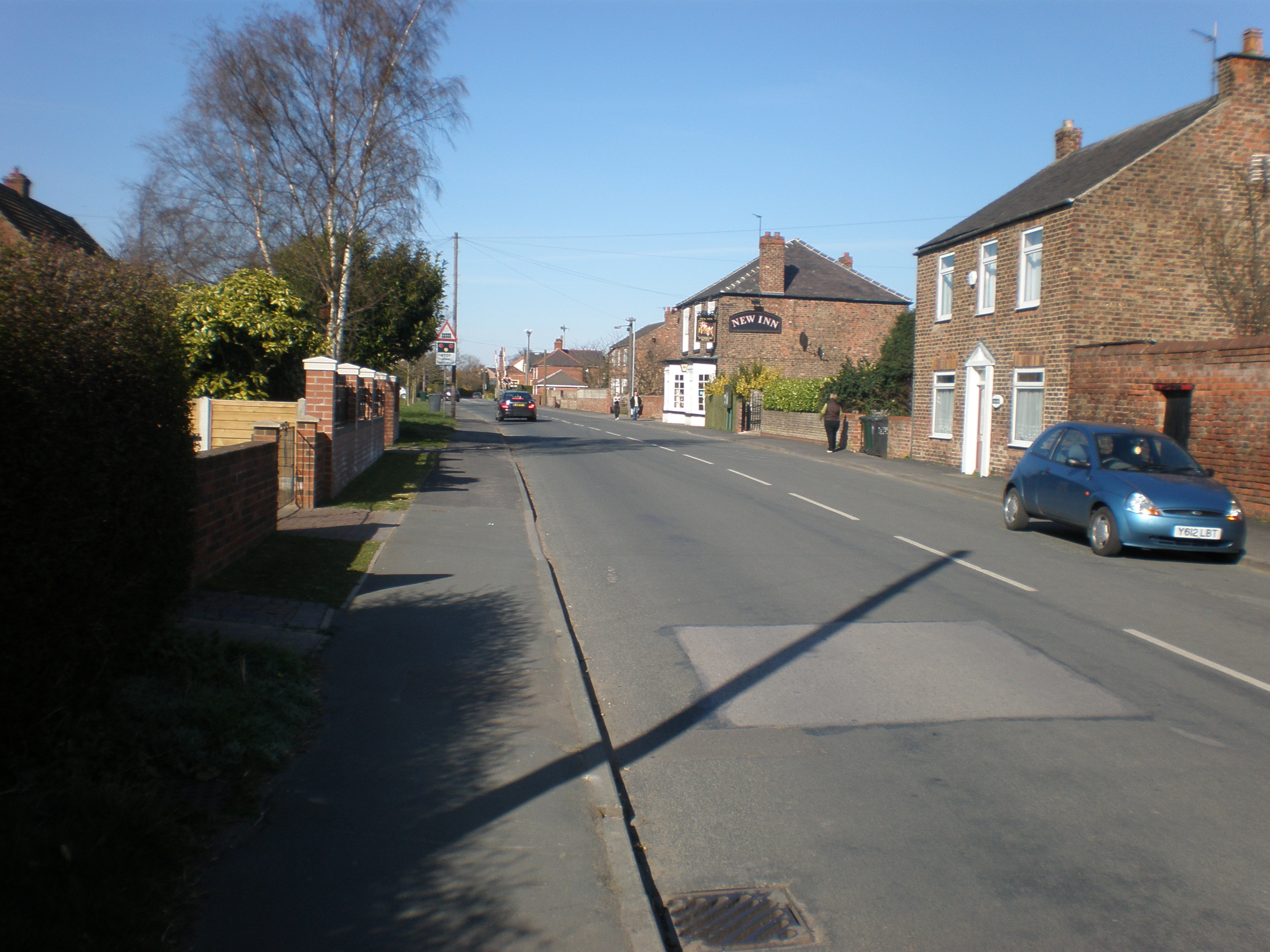
- Cliffe

- Location within North Yorkshire
- Population: 1,267 (2011 census)
- OS grid reference: SE662322
- Civil parish: Cliffe
- Unitary authority: North Yorkshire
- Ceremonial county: North Yorkshire
- Region: Yorkshire and the Humber
- Country: England
- Sovereign state: United Kingdom
- Post town: SELBY
- Postcode district: YO8
- Police: North Yorkshire
- Fire: North Yorkshire
- Ambulance: Yorkshire

Cliffe is a small village and civil parish in North Yorkshire, England. It was historically part of the East Riding of Yorkshire until 1974, but from 1974 to 2023 was in the Selby District of the shire county of North Yorkshire. In 2023 the district was abolished and North Yorkshire became a unitary authority.

The civil parish includes the villages of Cliffe Common, South Duffield, Lund, and Newhay.

The site of the former Selby Coalfield Whitemoor mine in the north of the parish is now a business park.

== Geography ==
The civil parish of Cliffe is bounded by Barlby with Osgodby to the west, Hemingbrough to the east, and the River Ouse to the south, and North Duffield and Skipwith to the north. The parish includes the village of Cliffe, as well as South Duffield and the hamlets of Cliffe Common, Lund and Newhay. Whitemoor business park is in the northern part of the parish.

The A63 Selby to Hull road and the Hull-Selby railway line pass roughly east–west through the parish; the A163 Market Weighton road, and the route of the former Selby-Market Weighton-Driffield railway line pass through the northern part of the parish. The parish is predominately agricultural land at around 5 metres (16 ft) above sea level. At the time of the 2001 UK census, Cliffe parish had a population of 1,143, increasing to 1,267 at the 2011 Census.

Cliffe has a public house (the New Inn), a butcher's shop and a mini-mart. The post office closed in 2007, although there is one at Hemingbrough.

Cliffe Voluntary Controlled Primary School received a grade 1 (outstanding) 2009 Ofsted inspection report.

== History ==
Archaeological evidence of humans living in the area dating back to the Iron Age or British Roman age has been found in the area between and around Cliffe and Cliffe Common; the evidence suggested rectangular enclosures thought to be part of a field system, as well as ditched enclosures, and roundhouses. Evidence of permanent human habitation in the medieval period has also been found, suggesting ridge and furrow farming.

=== Cliffe, Cliffe Common ===
Cliffe is recorded in the Domesday survey as being part of the manor of Howden. In the Middle Ages the village was in the Ouse and Derwent wapentake of the East Riding of Yorkshire. With the hamlet of Lund it formed the township of Cliffe cum Lund in the large ancient parish of Hemingbrough. Until the later Middle Ages Cliffe was on the banks of the River Ouse, but the river changed course when a meander was broken through.

In the medieval period much of the land was in the possession of the Bishops of Durham, passing to the Bishopric of Ripon in 1836. The remainder of the land passed through various hands, with part becoming of the manor of Turnham Hall.

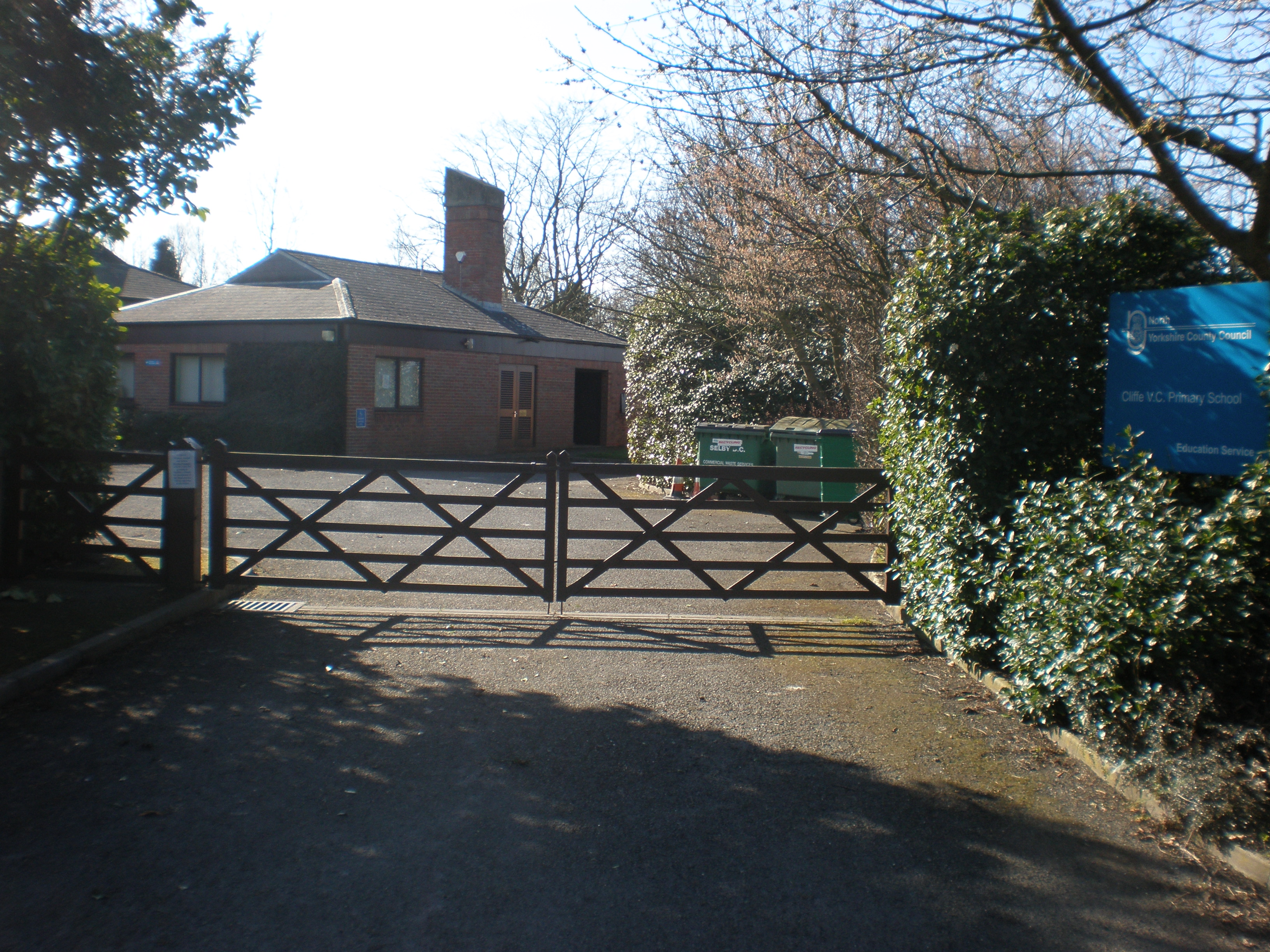
Cliffe Primary School (2009)

A school was established in 1708 with the bequeathal of £200 by Mary Waud. A school house was subsequently built, and, after further endowments, it was enlarged in 1835.

Non-conformist chapels were established in 1825 (Wesleyan, with Sunday school, closed 1968) and 1842 (Primitive Methodist, deregistered 1942). St Andrew's Church, Cliffe, was built in 1908.

A seed milling and crushing business was established at Cliffe in around 1840, the business ceased after the 1870s. By the 1890s maltings had been established at Cliffe and at Cliffe Common, near to the railway lines, both remained in business into the second half of the 20th century.

During the First World War a 3" anti-aircraft battery was installed at Cliffe.

From 1960 senior education was carried out at the secondary school in Barlby; the Cliffe school was still educating pupils in 1973, with 65 students.

The township of Cliffe cum Lund became a separate civil parish in 1866. In 1883 the hamlet of Newhay, which in medieval times had been on the south bank of the Ouse in the West Riding, was transferred from the parish of Drax. In 1935 the civil parish of Cliffe cum Lund was abolished and merged with the parish of South Duffield to form the new parish of Cliffe.

=== Railways ===
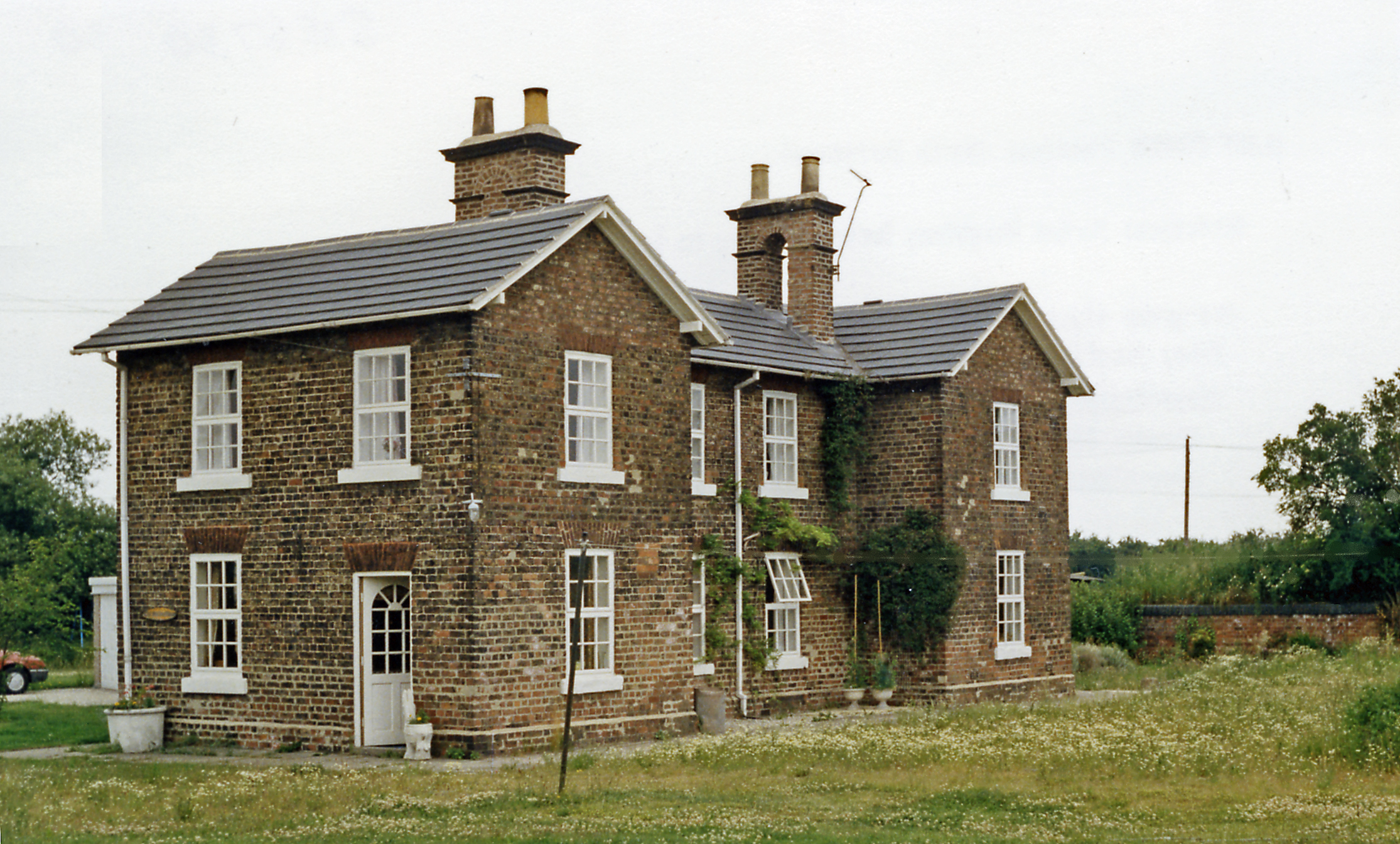
Former station building of Cliffe Common

The Hull and Selby Railway arrived in Cliffe in 1848, and a station was opened in the village as Cliffe Common Gate. It was later renamed Cliffe Common. The station closed in 1954, and the line closed in 1965. The Derwent Valley Light Railway opened in 1913 a branch from Cliffe Common; it closed to passengers in 1926; the section between Wheldrake and Cliffe Common closed completely in 1965.

=== South Duffield ===
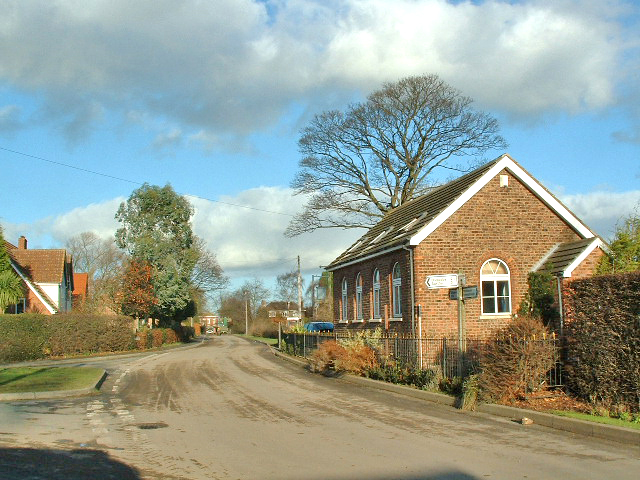
South Duffield (2006)

South Duffield was also a township in the ancient parish of Hemingbrough. There was a manor at South Duffield, now evidenced by an earthwork. The present South Duffield Hall dates from the late 1700s. Holmes House is older, dating from the early 17th century.

At South Duffield remains of previous activity included a former brick tower mill used for grain dating from c. 1800.

The Selby-Market Weighton railway line arrived in 1848, passing north of the village – a station (Duffield Gate railway station) was opened north of the village, which closed in 1884.

A school was built in 1881. From 1960 secondary students were educated at Barlby, and the school closed in 1962.

South Duffield became a separate civil parish in 1866. The civil parish was abolished in 1935.

=== Whitemoor mine ===
Whitemoor Mine was developed in the 1970s as part of the Selby coalfield, after closure in the 21st century the above ground site was redeveloped as Whitemoor Business Park.

== See also ==
- Listed buildings in Cliffe, Selby
