= South Duffield Windmill =

Windmill in North Yorkshire, England

Coordinates: 53°47′36″N 0°58′17″W

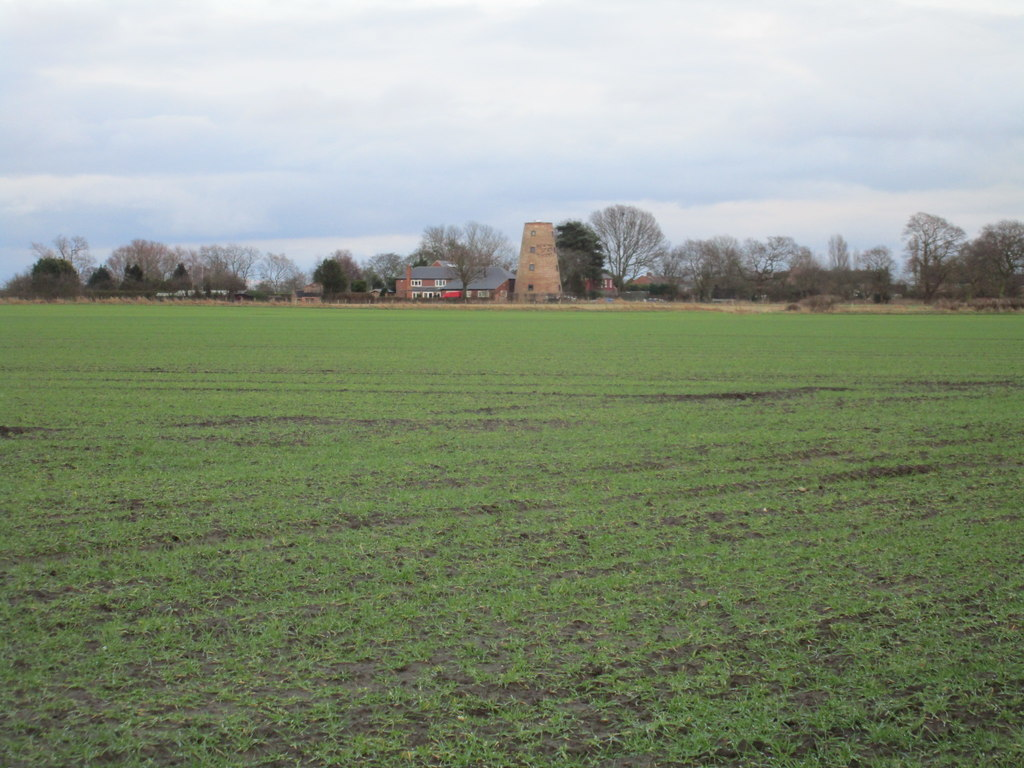
The mill, in 2017

South Duffield Windmill is a historic building in South Duffield, a village in North Yorkshire, in England.

A windmill was first recorded in South Duffield in 1311, when Luke de Hemingborough gave it to Drax Priory. A windmill was again recorded in the 17th century. The current mill was built in about 1800, and was used for grinding cereal. It was in use until about 1930, and appears to have been used again during World War II, before becoming derelict. The building was Grade II listed in 1988. In the 2010s, it was converted into a house.

The windmill is built of red brick, and consists of a circular tapering tower with four storeys. In the bottom storey is a doorway to the east and windows in the other faces, and above are four windows in each storey, all with segmental heads.

== See also ==
- Listed buildings in Cliffe, Selby
