= Listed buildings in Middleton on the Wolds =

Middleton on the Wolds is a civil parish in the county of the East Riding of Yorkshire, England. It contains four listed buildings that are recorded in the National Heritage List for England. Of these, one is listed at Grade II*, the middle of the three grades, and the others are at Grade II, the lowest grade. The parish contains the village of Middleton on the Wolds and the surrounding countryside, and the listed buildings consist of a church, monuments in the churchyard, a house and a milestone.

== Key ==
Grade	Criteria
II*	Particularly important buildings of more than special interest
II	Buildings of national importance and special interest

== Buildings ==
Name and location	Photograph	Date	Notes	Grade
St Andrew's Church; 53.93362°N 0.55960°W		Early 13th century	Apart from the chancel and the nave arcades, the church was largely rebuilt incorporating old masonry in 1873–74. It is built in stone with slate roofs, and consists of a nave, north and south aisles, a south porch, a chancel and a west tower. The tower has three stages, a chamfered plinth, angle buttresses rising to pilaster buttresses with nook shafts, lancet windows with hood moulds in the middle stage, and two-light pointed bell openings under hood moulds, above which is a frieze of blank quatrefoils, a corbel table, a coped parapet, and a pyramidal roof with a cross finial.	II*
Group of four monuments, St Andrew's Church; 53.93351°N 0.55949°W	—	13th century (probable)	The monuments in the churchyard, to the south of the church, consist of four grave slabs, three on the ground, with incised crosses, and the other with a human effigy, on colonnettes with dog-tooth ornament.	II
House west of St Andrew's Church; 53.93378°N 0.56108°W		18th century	The house, which was remodelled in the 19th century, is in chalk, with repairs in brick, and it has a pantile roof with tumbled-in brick on the raised gables. There is an L-shaped plan, the front range with one storey and attics, and five bays, and a later rear wing on the left with two storeys and four bays. On the main range are a doorway and a bow window. Most of the other windows on both ranges are sashes, and on the rear wing are casements.	II
Milestone; 53.93519°N 0.52409°W		Early 19th century	The milestone is on the west side of the B1248 road, to the east of East Field Farm. It consists of a cast iron plate inserted on a gritstone mounting block. The plate is inscribed with the distances to Malton and Beverley.	II
