= Foggathorpe railway station =

Disused railway station in the East Riding of Yorkshire, England

Foggathorpe
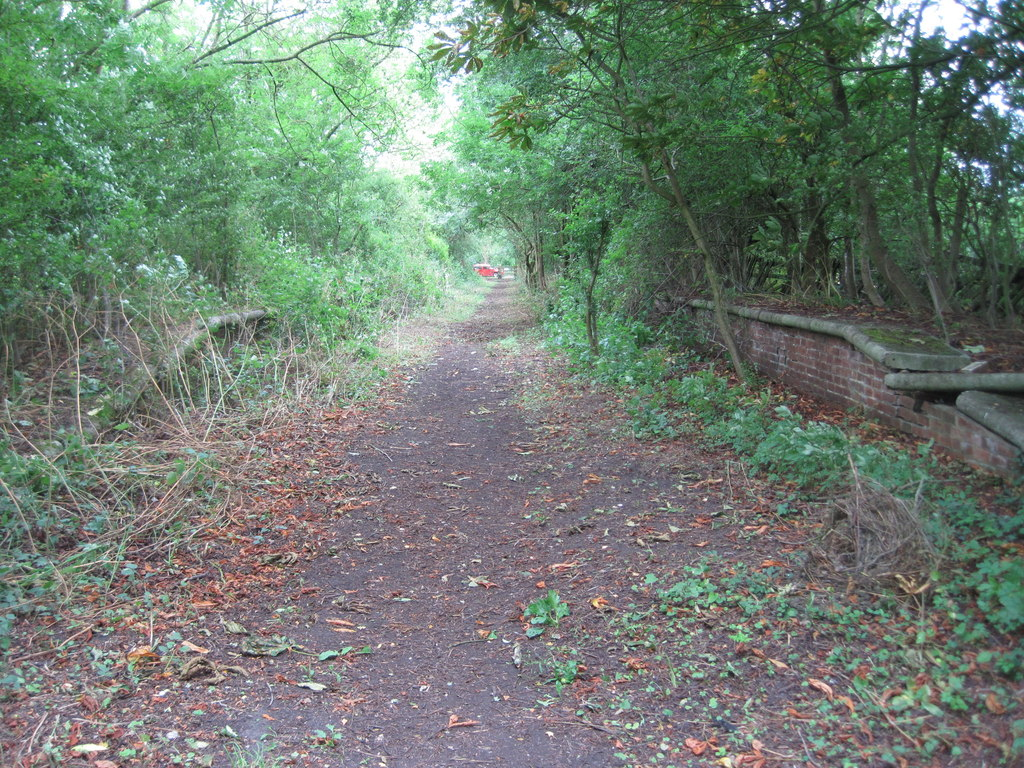
- Site of the former station in 2012

General information
- Location: Foggathorpe, East Riding of Yorkshire; England
- Coordinates: 53.826300°N 0.853000°W
- Grid reference: SE754373
- Platforms: 2

Other information
- Status: Disused

History
- Original company: York and North Midland Railway
- Pre-grouping: North Eastern Railway
- Post-grouping: London and North Eastern Railway; British Railways

Key dates
- 1853: Opened
- 1954: Closed
Location

Foggathorpe railway station was a station on the Selby to Driffield Line in the East Riding of Yorkshire, England serving the village of Foggathorpe. It opened as Foggathorpe Gate in 1853 and was renamed Foggathorpe in October 1864. It closed on 20 September 1954.

Preceding station	Disused railways	Following station
High Field	North Eastern Railway; Selby to Driffield Line	Holme Moor
