= Listed buildings in Foggathorpe =

Foggathorpe is a civil parish in the county of the East Riding of Yorkshire, England. It contains four listed buildings that are recorded in the National Heritage List for England. All the listed buildings are designated at Grade II, the lowest of the three grades, which is applied to "buildings of national importance and special interest". The parish contains villages and hamlets including Foggathorpe, and the surrounding countryside, and the listed buildings consist of a house and associated structures, and a milestone.

== Buildings ==
Name and location	Photograph	Date	Notes
Foggathorpe House; 53.82318°N 0.84885°W	—	Mid-18th century	The house, which was extended in the early 19th century, is in brick, The earlier part has a roof of stone slate, and the later part has a slate roof. The house has a double depth plane with an M-shaped roof, the rear range being the older. There are two storeys and three bays, flanked by bays with coped parapets and flat roofs. On the front is a Tuscan doorcase, and a doorway with a radial fanlight. The windows are sashes with channelled wedge lintels and fluted keystones. On the outer bays are blind windows. At the rear is a reset Doric doorcase with fluted pilasters and an open pediment, and a doorway with a radial fanlight.
Dovecote, Foggathorpe House; 53.82348°N 0.84891°W	—	Mid-18th century	The dovecote is in brick, with a stepped eaves course, and a pantile roof with gable coping and shaped kneelers. There are two storeys and two bays. On the ground floor are two doorways, one with a divided fanlight, and the upper floor has a fixed window. On the gable end are a slatted window and bird perches.
Farm buildings, Foggathorpe House; 53.82349°N 0.84862°W	—	Mid-18th century	The farm buildings are in brick, with pantile roof, coed gables and shaped kneelers, and they form a U-shaped plan. The main range has a two-storey threshing barn, and a single storey implement shed running parallel, and the wings have two storeys and three bays. The shed has three elliptical arches, the central arch with a fixed window, and the outer arches with doors. On the gable end are external steps to a granary.
Milestone; 53.82949°N 0.85500°W		Late 18th century	The milestone is attached to a cottage on the north side of the A163 road. It is a round-topped stone with a cast iron oval plaque inscribed "Selby 10 Weighn 8".
