= Menthorpe Gate railway station =

Disused railway station in North Yorkshire, England

Menthorpe Gate
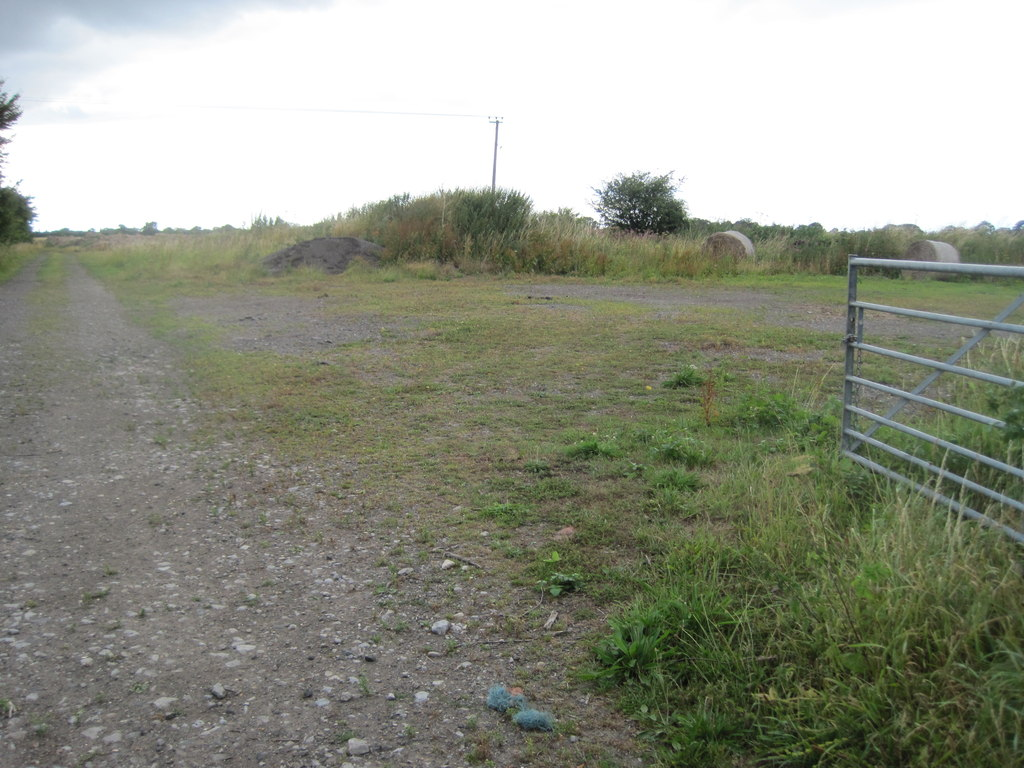
- Site of the former station in 2010

General information
- Location: North Duffield, North Yorkshire; England
- Coordinates: 53.805600°N 0.949000°W
- Grid reference: SE692349
- Platforms: 2

Other information
- Status: Disused

History
- Original company: York and North Midland Railway
- Pre-grouping: North Eastern Railway
- Post-grouping: London and North Eastern Railway; British Railways

Key dates
- 1851: Opened
- 1953: Closed for passengers
- 1964: closed for goods
Location

Menthorpe Gate railway station was a station on the Selby to Driffield Line in North Yorkshire, England serving the village of North Duffield and the hamlets of Menthorpe and Bowthorpe. It appeared first in public timetables in 1851 and kept the "Gate" suffix when it was dropped from many other station names in 1864.

The main station building, a two-storey brick building, was at the east end of the up platform, the signal box was on the west side of the level crossing on the down side of the line. The goods yard had two sidings and did not handle livestock.

The station closed to passengers on 7 December 1953 as the second of the intermediate stations on the line. It remained open for goods traffic until 27 January 1964. Station building and signalbox were dismantled in the early 1970s, only the crossing keeper's house still stands.

The 1881 census shows that Frances Calvert, a widow aged 69, was the "Station Mistress" at Menthorpe Gate.

Preceding station	Disused railways	Following station
Duffield Gate	NER; Selby to Driffield Line	Bubwith
