= St Mary's Church, Kirkburn =

Church in Kirkburn, East Riding of Yorkshire, England

Coordinates: 53°58′57″N 0°30′27″W

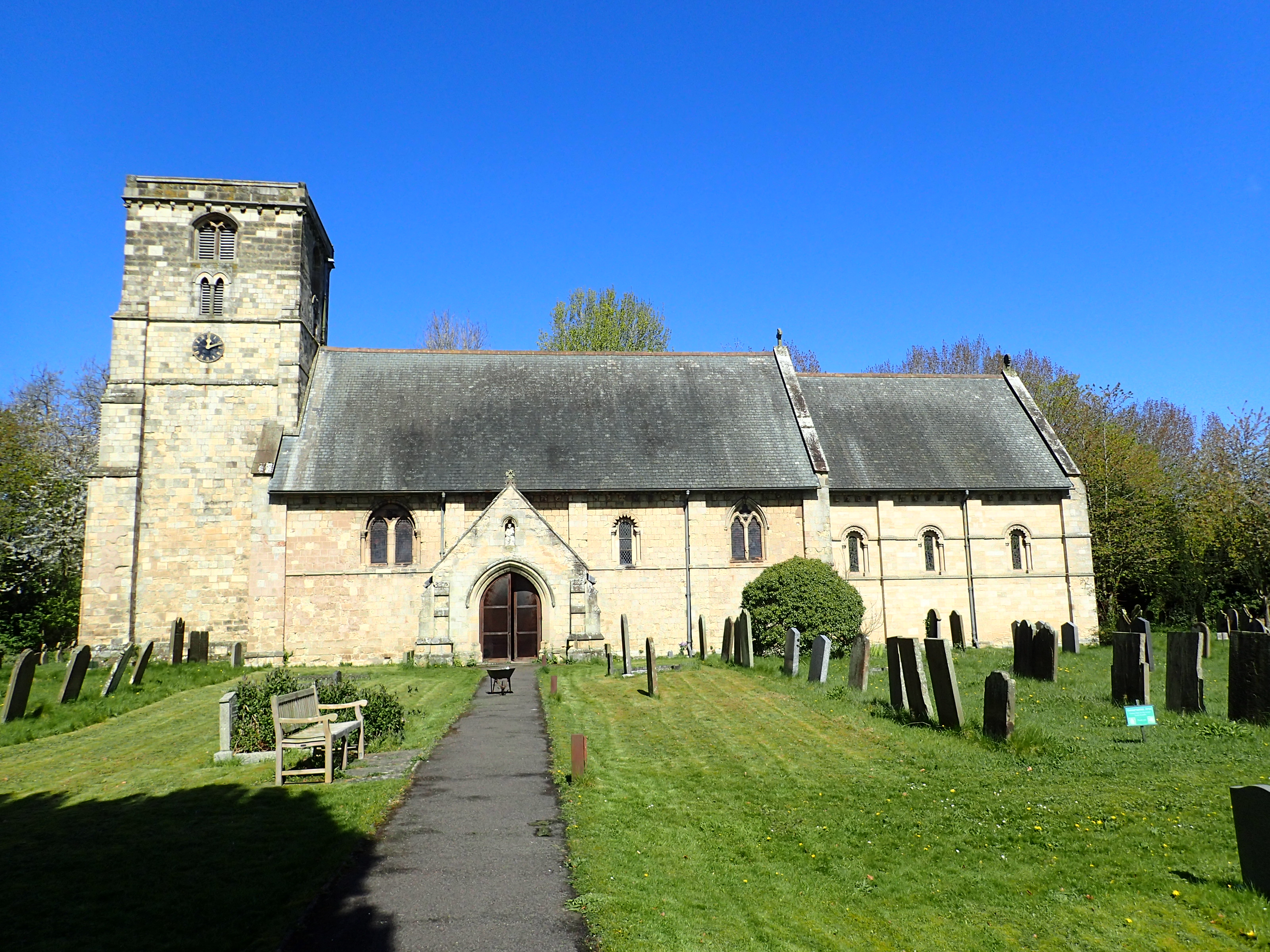
The church, in 2024

St Mary's Church is the parish church of Kirkburn, a village in the East Riding of Yorkshire, in England.

The church was built around 1139. In the 13th century, some additional windows were inserted, and a third stage was added to the tower. In the 15th century, a fourth stage was added to the tower, and a porch was constructed. Between 1856 and 1857, the chancel was rebuilt, a vestry was added, and the porch was heavily restored, all to designs by John Loughborough Pearson, with funding from Sir Tatton Sykes, 5th Baronet. The church was grade I listed in 1966.

The chancel arch and screen

The church is built of sandstone with a Welsh slate roof, and consists of a nave, a south porch, a chancel with a north vestry, and a west tower. The tower has four stages, a stepped and chamfered plinth, angle buttresses, bands, slit windows, a clock face, two-light bell openings a corbel table, and a low parapet. The porch has a chamfered pointed entrance, above which is a trefoil niche containing a statue, and the south doorway is Norman with three decorated orders. The north doorway is also Norman, but simpler, and the Norman font is highly carved. There are 91 corbels in total, of which 61 are 12th-century, though in poor condition. Inside, there is a tower staircase which becomes a spiral higher up, described by the National Churches Trust as "outstanding and unusual... a very ancient feature".. The Norman chancel arch has zigzag moulding and an elaborate wooden screen, designed by George Edmund Street in 1872. He also designed the marble reredos, which incorporates reliefs by James Redfern.

== See also ==
- Grade I listed buildings in the East Riding of Yorkshire
- Listed buildings in Kirkburn
