= Kelleythorpe =

Hamlet in the East Riding of Yorkshire, England

Coordinates: 53.993927°N 0.458671°W

- Location within the East Riding of Yorkshire
- OS grid reference: TA011564
  - London: 170 mi (270 km) S
- Civil parish: Kirkburn
- Unitary authority: East Riding of Yorkshire
- Ceremonial county: East Riding of Yorkshire
- Region: Yorkshire and the Humber
- Country: England
- Sovereign state: United Kingdom
- Post town: DRIFFIELD
- Postcode district: YO25
- Dialling code: 01377
- Police: Humberside
- Fire: Humberside
- Ambulance: Yorkshire
- UK Parliament: Bridlington and The Wolds

Kelleythorpe is a hamlet in the East Riding of Yorkshire, England, it forms part of the civil parish of Kirkburn. It is situated in the Yorkshire Wolds on the A614 road near to its junction with the A164 road. It is situated approximately 1 mile (1.6 km) south-west of Driffield town centre.

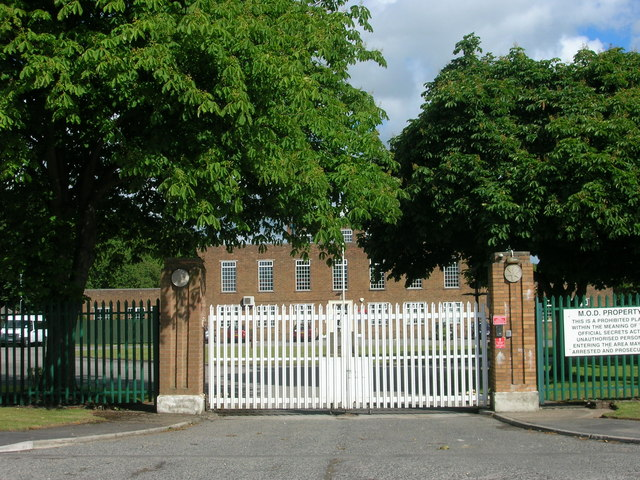
Entrance to Driffield Camp, Kellythorpe

Kellythorpe Industrial Estate is at the north of the hamlet.

The name Kelleythorpe derives from the Old Norse Kellingþorp meaning 'Kelling's secondary settlement'.
