= High Field railway station =

Disused railway station in the East Riding of Yorkshire, England

High Field
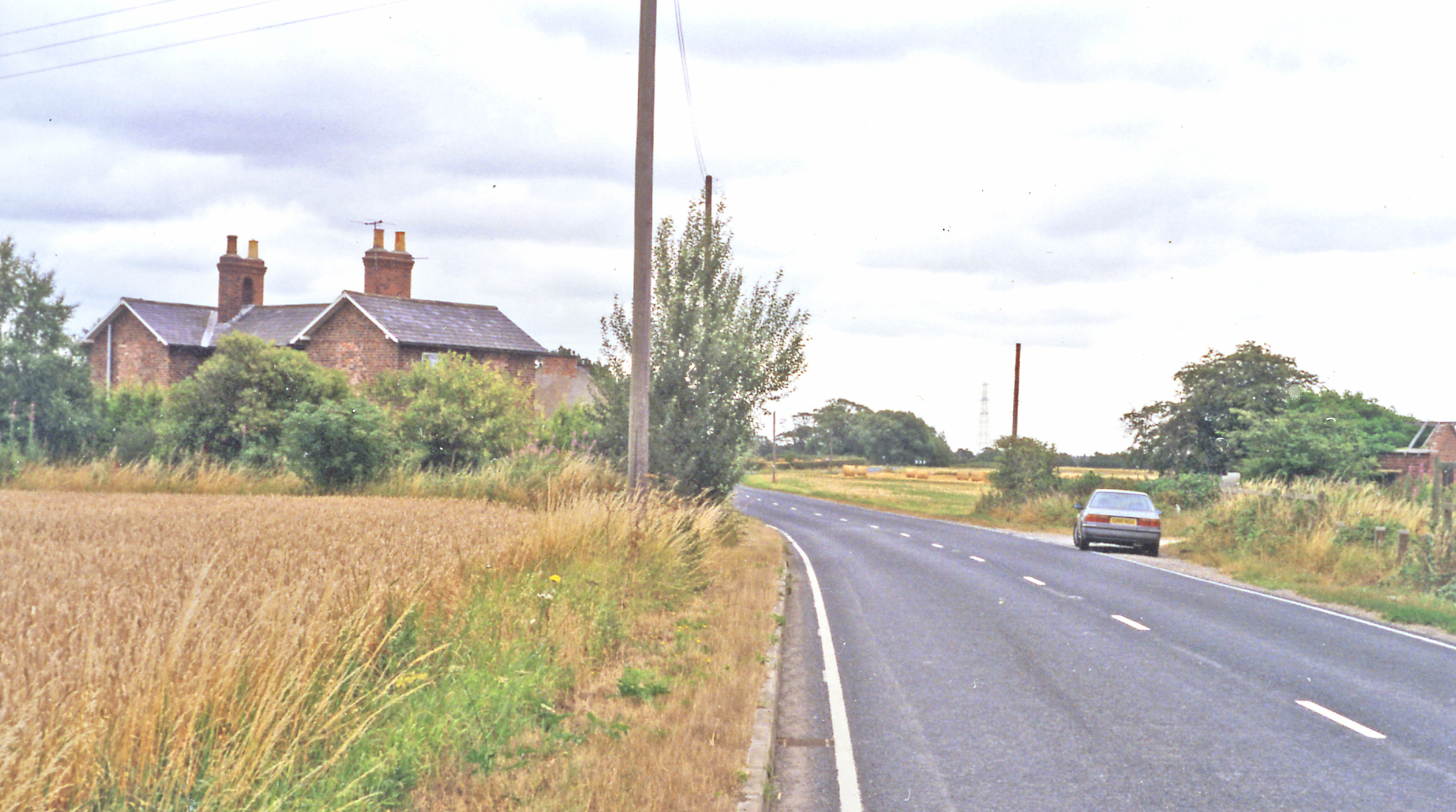
- Location of the station (1995)

General information
- Location: Bubwith, East Riding of Yorkshire; England
- Coordinates: 53.817100°N 0.896000°W
- Grid reference: SE727362
- Platforms: 2

Other information
- Status: Disused

History
- Original company: North Eastern Railway
- Pre-grouping: North Eastern Railway
- Post-grouping: London and North Eastern Railway; British Railways

Key dates
- 1859: Opened
- 1954: Closed
Location

High Field railway station was a station on the Selby to Driffield Line in the East Riding of Yorkshire, England serving the east end of the village of Bubwith. It opened as Bubwith High Field in 1859 and was renamed High Field on 1 December 1873. It closed on 20 September 1954.

Preceding station	Disused railways	Following station
Bubwith	North Eastern Railway; Selby to Driffield Line	Foggathorpe
