= Holme Moor railway station =

Disused railway station in the East Riding of Yorkshire, England

Holme Moor
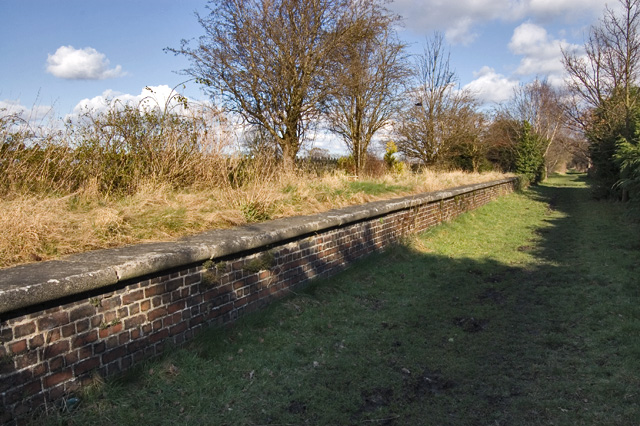
- Station platform in 2009

General information
- Location: Holme-on-Spalding-Moor, East Riding of Yorkshire; England
- Coordinates: 53.841000°N 0.788000°W
- Grid reference: SE798390
- Platforms: 2

Other information
- Status: Disused

History
- Original company: York and North Midland Railway
- Pre-grouping: North Eastern Railway
- Post-grouping: London and North Eastern Railway; British Railways

Key dates
- 1848: Opened
- 1954: Closed
Location

Holme Moor railway station was a station on the Selby to Driffield Line in the East Riding of Yorkshire, England serving the village of Holme-on-Spalding-Moor. It opened as Holme (Yorks) on 1 August 1848 and was renamed Holme Moor on 1 July 1923. It closed on 20 September 1954.

Preceding station	Disused railways	Following station
Foggathorpe	North Eastern Railway; Selby to Driffield Line	Everingham
