= Duffield Castle, North Yorkshire =

Former castle in North Yorkshire, England

Duffield Castle
- North Duffield, North Yorkshire

Location
- Coordinates: 53.8281°N 0.9504°W
- Grid reference: grid reference SE69183738

Duffield Castle lay on the flood plain of the River Derwent in the parish of North Duffield in the English county of North Yorkshire. It was documented in 1320. Duffield Castle was owned by John Hussey, 1st Baron Hussey of Sleaford, who was executed in 1537. It is uncertain when the castle was demolished, but all that remains today are earthworks marking the position of the mound and ditches. A farmhouse was later built on the site.
