= Listed buildings in Kirkburn =

Kirkburn is a civil parish in the county of the East Riding of Yorkshire, England. It contains three listed buildings that are recorded in the National Heritage List for England. Of these, one is listed at Grade I, the highest of the three grades, and the others are at Grade II, the lowest grade. The parish contains the village of Kirkburn and the surrounding area. All the listed buildings are in the village, and consist of a church, a pair of houses and a public house.

== Key ==
Grade	Criteria
I	Buildings of exceptional interest, sometimes considered to be internationally important
II	Buildings of national importance and special interest

== Buildings ==
Name and location	Photograph	Date	Notes	Grade
St Mary's Church; 53.98240°N 0.50763°W		c. 1132	The church has been altered and extended through the centuries, including alterations by J. L. Pearson in 1856–57. It is built in sandstone with a Welsh slate roof, and consists of a nave, a south porch, a chancel with a north vestry, and a west tower. The tower has four stages, a stepped and chamfered plinth, angle buttresses, bands, slit windows, a clock face, two-light bell openings a corbel table, and a low parapet. The porch has a chamfered pointed entrance, above which is a trefoil niche containing a statue, and the south doorway is Norman with three decorated orders. The north doorway is also Norman, but simpler, and the Norman font is highly carved.	I
1 and 3 Main Street; 53.98314°N 0.50452°W	—	Late 18th century (probable)	A pair of houses in colourwashed brick, with a floor band, a stepped eaves band and a pantile roof. There are two storeys and three bays, and a rear range. On the front are two doorways with elliptical-arched heads. The windows are sashes, those on the ground floor with elliptical heads.	II
The Queen's Head Inn; 53.98316°N 0.50436°W		Early to mid-19th century (probable)	A house, later a public house, in reddish-yellow brick, with a modillion eaves band, and pantile roofs. The main range has two storeys and three bays. The central doorway is recessed, and has fluted pilasters, a rectangular fanlight, a cornice and a hood. The windows are sashes with wedge lintels. To the left is an extension in reddish-orange brick, with a sash window on the ground floor and two casement windows above.	II
