= Enthorpe railway station =

Disused railway station in the East Riding of Yorkshire, England

Enthorpe
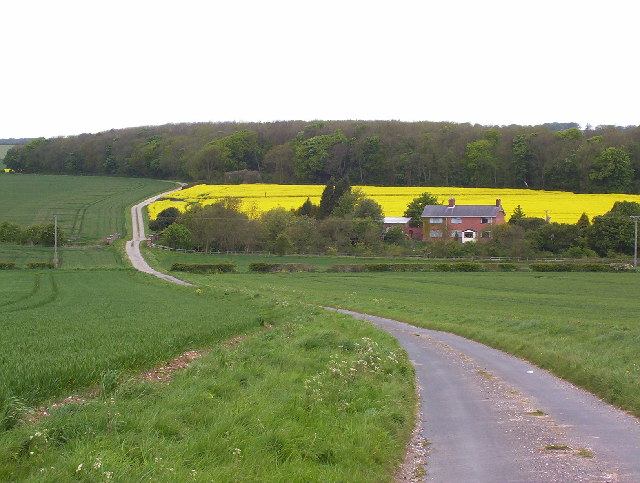
- View of Enthorpe station in 2005

General information
- Location: East Riding of Yorkshire; England
- Coordinates: 53.902000°N 0.609300°W
- Grid reference: SE914459
- Platforms: 2

Other information
- Status: Disused

History
- Original company: North Eastern Railway
- Pre-grouping: North Eastern Railway
- Post-grouping: London and North Eastern Railway; British Railways

Key dates
- 1890: Opened
- 1954: Closed
Location

Enthorpe railway station was a station on the Selby to Driffield Line in the East Riding of Yorkshire, England. It opened on 1 May 1890 and closed on 20 September 1954.

The station is home to several restored goods wagons, which are used as holiday accommodation.

Preceding station	Disused railways	Following station
Market Weighton	North Eastern Railway; Selby to Driffield Line	Middleton-on-the-Wolds
