= Eastburn, East Riding of Yorkshire =

Hamlet in the East Riding of Yorkshire, England

Coordinates: 53.987466°N 0.487813°W

Eastburn
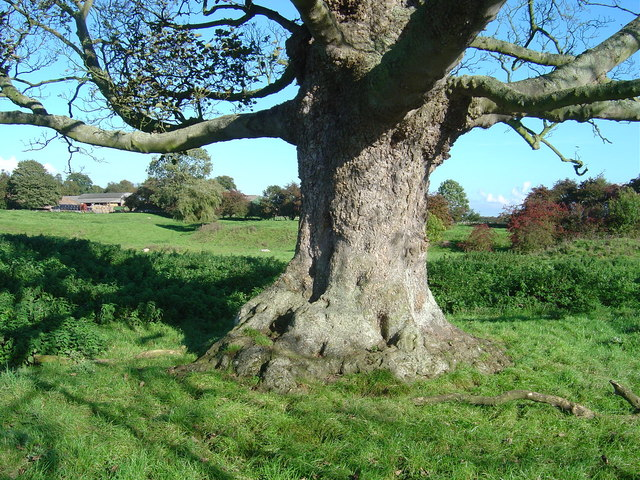
- Site of the village of Eastburn

- Location within the East Riding of Yorkshire
- OS grid reference: SE992556
  - London: 170 mi (270 km) S
- Civil parish: Kirkburn
- Unitary authority: East Riding of Yorkshire
- Ceremonial county: East Riding of Yorkshire
- Region: Yorkshire and the Humber
- Country: England
- Sovereign state: United Kingdom
- Post town: DRIFFIELD
- Postcode district: YO25
- Dialling code: 01377
- Police: Humberside
- Fire: Humberside
- Ambulance: Yorkshire
- UK Parliament: Bridlington and The Wolds

Eastburn is a hamlet and former civil parish, now in the parish of Kirkburn, in the East Riding of Yorkshire, England. It is situated in the Yorkshire Wolds on the A164 road, approximately 2.5 miles (4 km) south-west of Driffield town centre and 3 miles (5 km) north-west of the village of Hutton Cranswick. In 1931 the parish had a population of 27.

== History ==
In 1823 Eastburn was in the parish of Kirkburn, the Wapentake of Harthill, and had a population of 12, which included a yeoman.

Eastburn was formerly a township in the parish of Kirkbnrn, from 1866 Eastburn was a civil parish in its own right, on 1 April 1935 the parish was abolished to form Kirkburn.
