= Middleton-on-the-Wolds railway station =

Disused railway station in the East Riding of Yorkshire, England

Middleton-on-the-Wolds
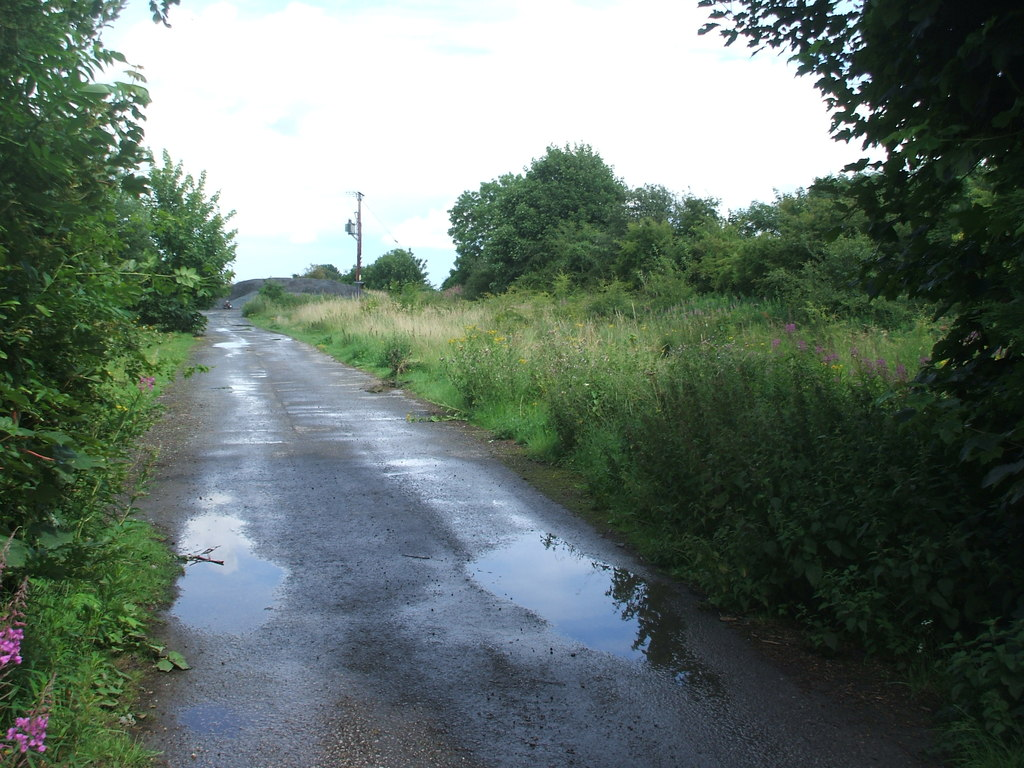
- Site of the former station (2009)

General information
- Location: Middleton on the Wolds, East Riding of Yorkshire; England
- Coordinates: 53.936460°N 0.561200°W
- Grid reference: SE945498
- Platforms: 2

Other information
- Status: Disused

History
- Original company: North Eastern Railway
- Pre-grouping: North Eastern Railway
- Post-grouping: London and North Eastern Railway; British Railways

Key dates
- 1890: Opened
- 1954: Closed
Location

Middleton-on-the-Wolds railway station was a railway station on the Selby to Driffield Line. It opened on 1 May 1890 and served the village of Middleton on the Wolds. It closed on 20 September 1954.

Preceding station	Disused railways	Following station
Enthorpe	NER; Selby to Driffield Line	Bainton
