= Turnham Hall =

Historic building in England

Coordinates: 53°46′30″N 1°01′20″W

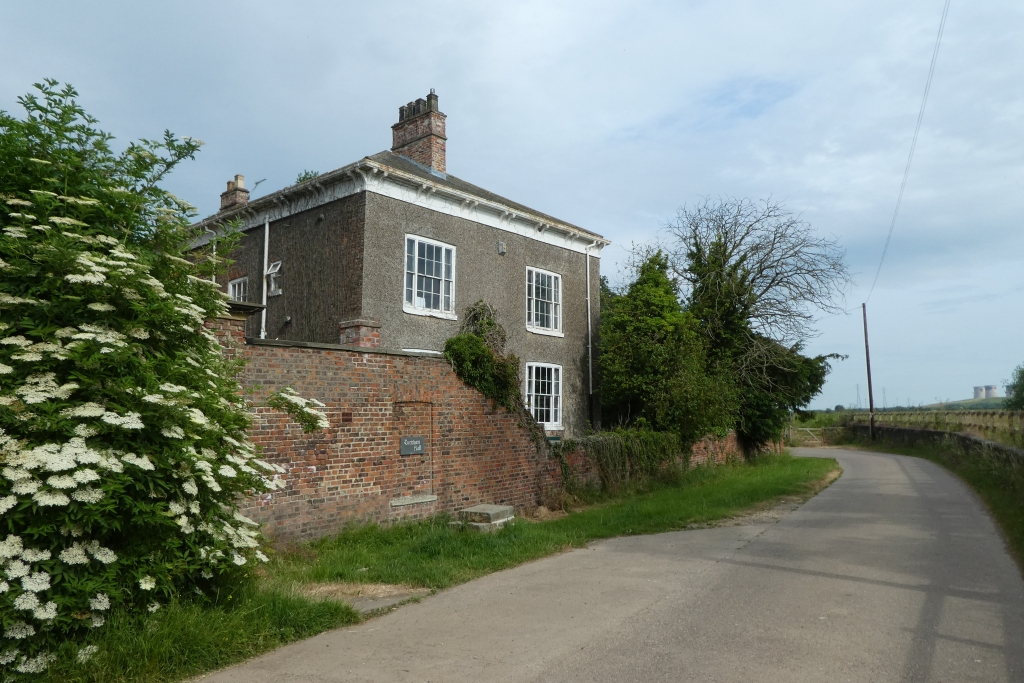
The house, in 2023

Turnham Hall is a historic building in Cliffe, a village near Selby in North Yorkshire, in England.

The original Turnham Hall may well have been built by Robert de Turnham, in the reign of Richard I of England. A licence to crenellate was received by John Pylkyngton in 1477. It was a timber-framed building, and in the 15th century it was recorded as consisting of a hall with two chambers, a kitchen, brewhouse, a chapel, and several smaller rooms. It was surrounded by a moat which was visible until the early 19th century. It was rebuilt in about 1600, and again between 1796 and 1802. It was greatly extended in about 1820, with the older section becoming the service wing, and was altered in the 20th century. The building was Grade II listed in 1998.

The house is built of brick. It has two storeys and three bays, a hipped slate roof, and a wooden cornice with paired eaves brackets. The central doorway has moulded pilasters, a fanlight and a flat hood on brackets, and above it is a re-set datestone. It is flanked by canted bay windows, and in the upper floor are sash windows. The service wing to the right has two storeys, a pantile roof and sash windows, and the southwest front is rendered.

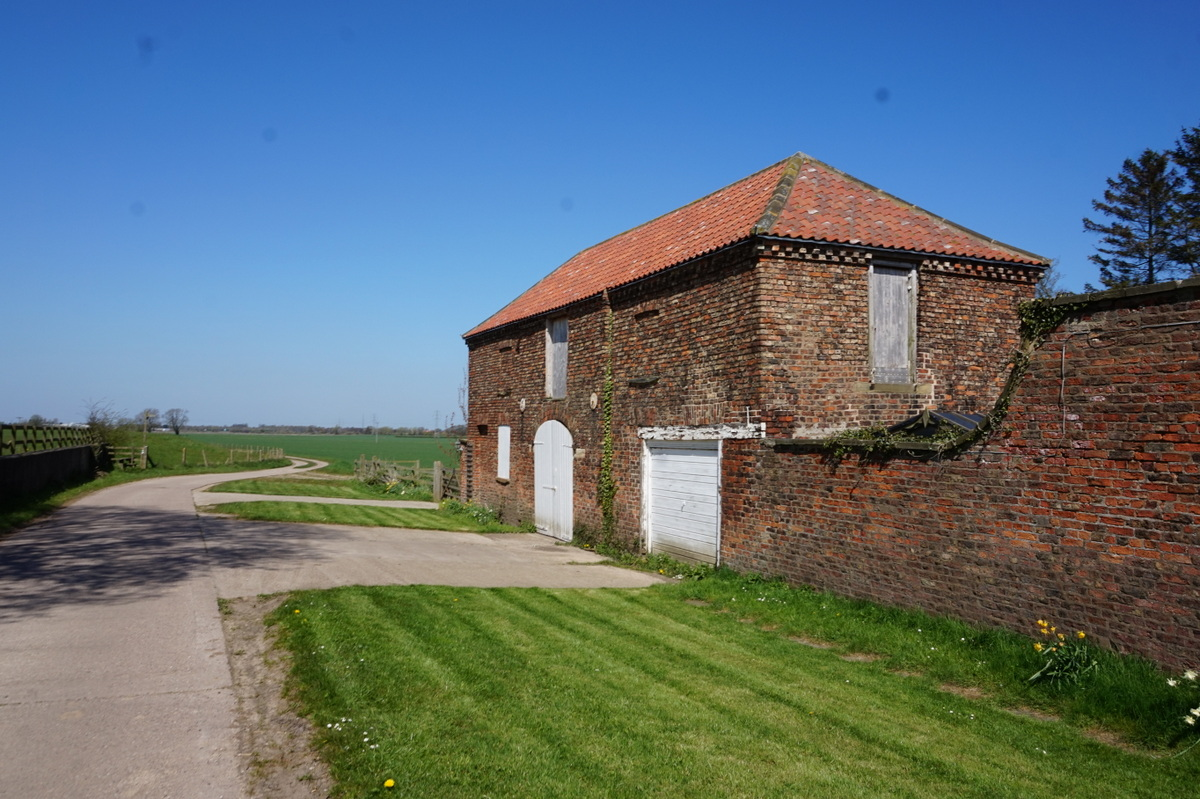
The coach house and stable

Two ancillary building are also grade II listed. The late-18th century coach house and stable are built of brick with dentilled eaves and a hipped pantile roof. There are two storeys and three bays. In the centre is a segmental-headed carriage entrance and a loft door above, to the left is a window and a doorway, and to the right is an inserted garage door. An agricultural warehouse is also built of brick, with dentilled eaves, and a pantile roof with stone coped gables and kneelers. There are three storeys, and the building contains three doorways with fanlights, and casement windows, and to the right is an external staircase.

== See also ==
- Listed buildings in Cliffe, Selby
