= St Andrew's Church, Cliffe =

Church in Cliffe, North Yorkshire, England

Coordinates: 53.7782°N 0.9970°W

St Andrew's Church is a mission church in Cliffe, a village near Selby in North Yorkshire, in England.

A chantry chapel linked to Cliffe was established at Drax Priory in 1345. There was no Anglican place of worship in the village until 1908, when a mission church (Note: A mission church is an outlying non-parish church, similar to a chapel of ease, established to reach those for whom the parish church would be inaccessible; it is directly supported by the parish or diocese.) linked to St Mary the Virgin, Hemingbrough was constructed. It was a small wooden structure, but supported a service each Sunday. It was rebuilt in brick in 1985 and is now described by the Church of England as a "tranquil place for worship", which is also ideal for holding meetings.
