= St Andrew's Church, Middleton-on-the-Wolds =

Church in the East Riding of Yorkshire, England

Coordinates: 53°56′01″N 0°33′35″W

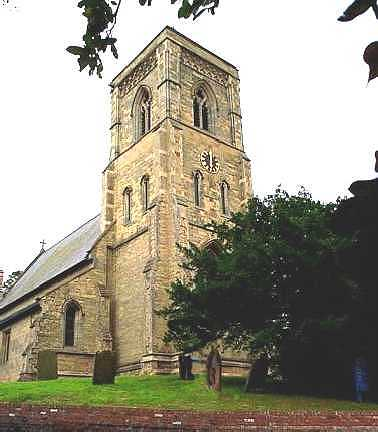
The church, in 2002

St Andrew's Church is the parish church of Middleton-on-the-Wolds, a village in the East Riding of Yorkshire, in England.

The church was built in the early 13th century, from which period the chancel and the arcades of the nave survive. The interior was redesigned in 1821, and the tower was rebuilt in 1830, to a design described by Stephen Glynne as "poor modern work". Most of the church was rebuilt in 1873 to a design by S. M. Teale, who reused the old materials. The building was grade II* listed in 1966.

View from the nave into the chancel

The church is built of stone with slate roofs, and consists of a nave, north and south aisles, a south porch, a chancel and a west tower. The tower has three stages, a chamfered plinth, angle buttresses rising to pilaster buttresses with nook shafts, lancet windows with hood moulds in the middle stage, and two-light pointed bell openings under hood moulds, above which is a frieze of blank quatrefoils, a corbel table, a coped parapet, and a pyramidal roof with a cross finial. Inside, there are three sedilia, a Bronze Age beaker, and a 12th-century tub font.

== See also ==
- Grade II* listed buildings in the East Riding of Yorkshire
- Listed buildings in Middleton on the Wolds
