= Duffield (surname) =

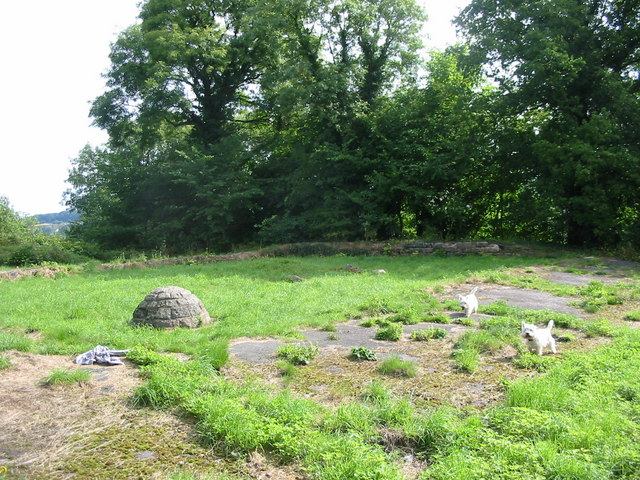
- Duffield Castle

Origin
- Origin: Anglo-Saxon
- Meaning: (English) Belonging to Duffield, probably the Dove-Field [Old English dufe + feld].
- Region of origin: England

Other names
- Variant forms: Duffeld, Duffell, Duffill, Duffitt, and others

Duffield is a surname in the United Kingdom, Canada, Australia, South Africa, Zimbabwe and the United States. The surname emerged in the 1300s and is derived from the villages of Duffield in Yorkshire and Derbyshire.

== History ==
Hereditary surnames were first introduced in Britain in baronial families following the Norman Conquest in 1066. The knightly class began to adopt hereditary names in the 1100s, filtering down to most English families by 1400, although their form was still evolving. Around half of English surnames were derived from a location, either a specific village (Attenborough) or a topographical feature (e.g Hill, Wood). Most sources suggest the surname originated from the villages of Duffield in Yorkshire and Derbyshire. In 1891, 27% of Duffields lived in Yorkshire or a neighbouring county, a further 13% lived in Derbyshire or a neighbouring county and 14% lived in Norfolk or a neighbouring county. It is thought that many of the Norfolk Duffields are descended from an immigrant family who took the surname as it was similar sounding to their original surname and it was already established in the area.

Families began migrating abroad in enormous numbers during the political and religious discontent in England. Some of the first immigrants to cross the Atlantic and move to North America bore the name Duffield; e.g., John Duffield, a boy of 14, landed in Virginia, United States, in 1622. Benjamin Duffield made New Jersey his home in 1678. Over the next hundred years, the name Duffield was to be found in Philadelphia and other eastern seaboard cities.

Duffield is ranked the 10,366th most common out of 88,799 surnames in the United States.

== Notable people ==
- Alexander Duffield (1821–1890), English mining engineer, Hispanist and writer
- Andrew Duffield (born 1958), Australian musician
- Barry Duffield (born 1962), Australian actor, producer, scriptwriter and director
- D. Bethune Duffield (1821–1891), American poet and attorney
- Brian Duffield, American screenwriter
- Burkely Duffield (born 1992), Canadian actor
- David Duffield (sports commentator) (1931–2016), British cyclist and TV commentator
- David Duffield (born 1941), American software businessman
- George Duffield (disambiguation), several people
- JaCorian Duffield (born 1992), American athlete
- Jadey Duffield (born 1991), English actress, model and dancer
- John Duffield (born 1939), British financier
- Linda Duffield (born 1953), British diplomat
- Paul Duffield (born 1985), Australian footballer
- Peter Duffield (born 1969), English footballer
- Richard Duffield (fl.1413–1435), English politician
- Robert Duffield (journalist) (1935–2000), Australian journalist
- Rosie Duffield (born 1971), British politician
- Thomas Duffield (academic), Master of University College, Oxford
- Thomas Duffield (died 1579), English politician
- Thomas Duffield (MP for Abingdon) (1782–1854), English farmer and politician
- Victoria Duffield (born 1995), Canadian singer, actress and dancer
- Dame Vivien Duffield (born 1946), British philanthropist
- Walter Duffield (1816–1882), British pastoralist and politician in South Australia
- Walter Geoffrey Duffield (1879–1929), Australian physicist and astronomer
- William Duffield (painter) (1816–1863), British still-life painter
- William Ward Duffield (1823–1907), American coal executive, railroad engineer and army officer
- William E. Duffield (1922–2001), American politician from Pennsylvania

== See also ==
- Duffield (disambiguation)
