= Bubwith railway station =

Disused railway station in the East Riding of Yorkshire, England

Bubwith
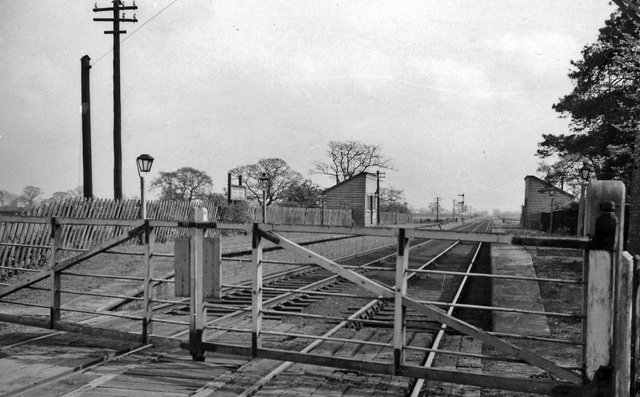
- Bubwith station in 1961

General information
- Location: Bubwith, East Riding of Yorkshire; England
- Coordinates: 53.812800°N 0.917200°W
- Grid reference: SE713357
- Platforms: 2

Other information
- Status: Disused

History
- Original company: York and North Midland Railway
- Pre-grouping: North Eastern Railway
- Post-grouping: London and North Eastern Railway

Key dates
- 1848: Opened
- 1954: Closed
Location

Bubwith railway station was a station on the Selby to Driffield Line in the East Riding of Yorkshire, England serving the village of Bubwith. It opened on 1 August 1848 and closed on 20 September 1954.

Preceding station	Disused railways	Following station
Menthorpe Gate	North Eastern Railway; Selby to Driffield Line	High Field
