= Southburn railway station =

Disused railway station in the East Riding of Yorkshire, England

Southburn

General information
- Location: Southburn, East Riding of Yorkshire; England
- Coordinates: 53.9738°N 0.4861°W
- Grid reference: SE 9939 5414
- Platforms: 2

Other information
- Status: Disused

History
- Original company: Scarborough, Bridlington and West Riding Junction Railway
- Pre-grouping: North Eastern Railway
- Post-grouping: London and North Eastern Railway

Key dates
- 1890: Opened
- 1954: Closed
Location

Southburn railway station was a railway station on the Selby to Driffield Line. It opened on 1 May 1890 and served the villages of Southburn and Kirkburn in the East Riding of Yorkshire, England. It closed on 20 September 1954 but the line remained open as a through route for excursions until complete closure on 14 June 1965. Little remains of the station with the exception of the platform edges and the station cottages. A farm building occupies the place of the demolished station building.

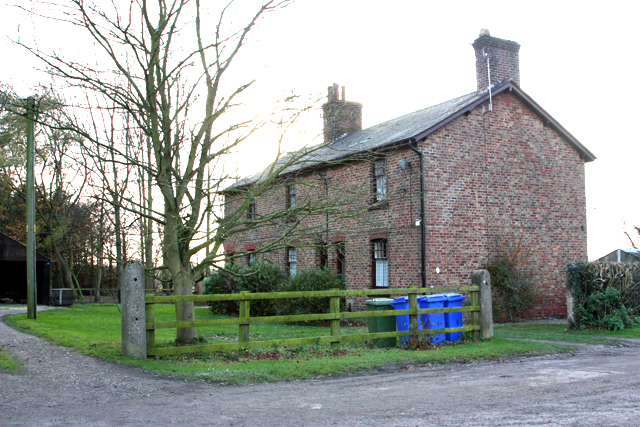
Station cottages (2008)

| Preceding station | Disused railways | Following station |
|---|---|---|
| Bainton | North Eastern Railway; Selby to Driffield Line | Driffield |
