= Bainton railway station =

Disused railway station in the East Riding of Yorkshire, England

Bainton
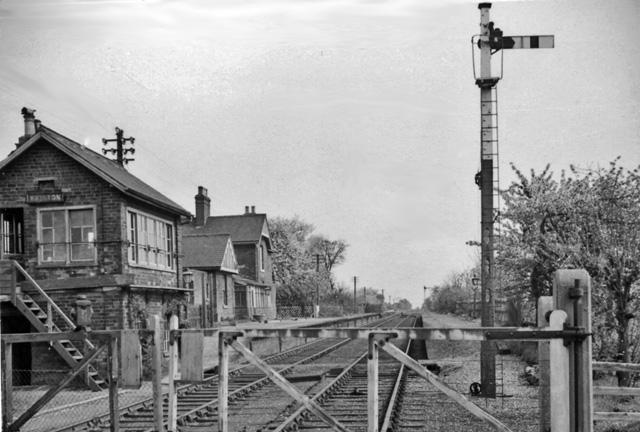
- Bainton railway station in 1961

General information
- Location: Bainton, East Riding of Yorkshire; England
- Coordinates: 53.945967°N 0.526340°W
- Grid reference: SE968509
- Platforms: 2

Other information
- Status: Disused

History
- Original company: Scarborough, Bridlington and West Riding Junction Railway
- Pre-grouping: North Eastern Railway
- Post-grouping: London and North Eastern Railway

Key dates
- 1 May 1890: Station opened
- 20 September 1954: Station closed
Location

Bainton railway station was a station on the Selby to Driffield Line. It opened on 1 May 1890 and served the village of Bainton. It closed on 20 September 1954.

== History ==
The station, which was 1 mile (1.6 km) south of the village of Bainton was opened by the Scarborough, Bridlington and West Riding Junction Railway in May 1890. It was then run by the North Eastern Railway, and became part of the London and North Eastern Railway during the Grouping of 1923. The station then passed on to the Eastern Region of British Railways on nationalisation in 1948.

Preceding station	Disused railways	Following station
Middleton-on-the-Wolds	North Eastern Railway; Selby to Driffield Line	Southburn
