= Listed buildings in Cliffe, Selby =

Cliffe is a civil parish in the former Selby district of North Yorkshire, England. It contains 14 listed buildings that are recorded in the National Heritage List for England. Of these, one is listed at Grade II*, the middle of the three grades, and the others are at Grade II, the lowest grade. The parish contains the villages of Cliffe and South Duffield and the surrounding countryside. Apart from a windmill, all the listed buildings are houses and associated structures.

== Key ==
Grade	Criteria
II*	Particularly important buildings of more than special interest
II	Buildings of national importance and special interest

== Buildings ==
Name and location	Photograph	Date	Notes	Grade
Holmes House; 53.78501°N 0.94482°W		Early 17th century	The house is in colourwashed brick, with a floor band, and a pantile roof with gable bands and a right curvilinear gable. There are two storeys and five bays. The middle bay projects as a two-story gabled porch containing a round-arched doorway with engaged columns, imposts, and a moulded pediment. Above it is a two-light mullioned window with a pediment. The outer bays contain mullioned and transomed windows in round openings with cogged surrounds. The ground floor windows have triangular pediments in the outer bays and segmental pediments in the inner bays.	II*
The Knowle; 53.79292°N 0.96600°W		Early to mid 18th century	A rendered house with a moulded floor band, a wooden dentilled cornice, and a Welsh slate roof with stone coping and kneelers. There are two storeys, four bays, and a rear wing. The central doorway has pilasters, a fanlight, and a hood on brackets, and the windows are sashes.	II
The White House; 53.77725°N 0.99637°W		Early to mid 18th century	The house is in rendered and colourwashed brick, on a plinth, with a cogged eaves band, and a swept pantile roof with rendered coping and kneelers. There are two storeys and two bays. On the front are a doorway and multi-paned 20th century windows, those in the upper floor bowed.	II
Dyon House; 53.79014°N 0.94982°W	—	Mid 18th century (probable)	The house is in reddish-brown brick, with cogged eaves, and a pantile roof with brick coping and kneelers. There are two storeys, three bays, and a rear outshut. In the centre is a doorway with a fire window above, and in the outer bays are casement windows. The ground floor openings have elliptical arches.	II
Crayker House; 53.77663°N 0.99311°W	—	Mid to late 18th century	The house is in pinkish-brown brick on a plinth, with dressings in red brick and stone, a floor band, a modillion eaves cornice, and a pantile roof with stone coping and brick kneelers. There are two storeys, three bays, and a rear range. On the front is a central doorway and 20th-century windows, all under flat gauged brick arches.	II
South Duffield Hall; 53.79237°N 0.96410°W	—	Late 18th century	A house in pinkish-brown brick with a floor band and a pantile roof. There are two storeys, three bays, and a rear range. The central doorway has pilasters, a fanlight, and a hood on brackets. The windows are sashes with painted wedge lintels.	II
Top End House; 53.77732°N 0.99722°W		Late 18th century	A coaching inn, later a private house, in pinkish-brown brick, with stone dressings, a floor band, a wooden dentilled eaves cornice, and a pantile roof with stone copings and kneelers. There are two storeys, three bays, the middle bay projecting slightly, and a rear extension. The central doorway has an eared architrave, a fluted frieze and a pediment. The windows are sashes with margin lights, fluted wedge lintels and keystones, those in the ground floor with shutters. In the gable ends are blocked pitching holes.	II
Turnham Hall and service wing 53.77495°N 1.02213°W		Late 18th century	The service wing is the earlier part, the house dating from about 1820, and they are both in brick. The house has two storeys and three bays, a hipped slate roof, and a wooden cornice with paired eaves brackets. The central doorway has moulded pilasters, a fanlight and a flat hood on brackets, and above it is a re-set datestone. It is flanked by canted bay windows, and in the upper floor are sash windows. The service wing to the right has two storeys, a pantile roof and sash windows, and the southwest front is rendered.	II
Coach House and stable, Turnham Hall; 53.77530°N 1.02261°W		Late 18th century	The coach house and stable are in brick with dentilled eaves and a hipped pantile roof. There are two storeys and three bays. In the centre is a segmental-headed carriage entrance and a loft door above, to the left is a window and a doorway, and to the right is an inserted garage door.	II
Warehouse, Turnham Hall; 53.77517°N 1.02230°W	—	Late 18th century	The agricultural warehouse is in brick, with dentilled eaves, and a pantile roof with stone coped gables and kneelers. There are three storeys, and the building contains three doorways with fanlights, and casement windows, and to the right is an external staircase.	II
Windmill; 53.79332°N 0.97131°W		c. 1800	The tower windmill is in red brick, and consists of a circular tapering tower with four storeys. In the bottom storey is a doorway to the east and windows in the other faces, and above are four windows in each storey, all with segmental heads.	II
Corner House Farm; 53.79282°N 0.96809°W		Early 19th century	The house is in pinkish-brown brick on a plinth, with dressings in red brick and stone, a floor band, sprocketed eaves, and a French tile roof with stone coping and kneelers. Steps lead up to a central doorway, the windows are sashes, and the openings have painted flat brick arches.	II
Manor House; 53.79295°N 0.96736°W		Early 19th century	The house is in pinkish-brown brick, the front in red brick, with stone dressings, a floor band, a dentilled cornice, and a hipped Welsh slate roof. There are two storeys and an L-shaped plan, with a front range of six bays. The doorway has reeded pilasters, a decorative fanlight, a frieze and a hood. The windows are sashes with wedge lintels and keystones, and at the rear is a staircase window with radial glazing to its head.	II
Yeoman's Farm; 53.78539°N 0.99423°W	—	Early 19th century (probable)	A house in reddish-brown brick, with stone dressings, a floor band, and a pantile roof with stone coping and kneelers. There are two storeys and three bays. The central doorway has a fanlight and a cornice on brackets, and the windows are sashes with wedge lintels.	II
