= Everingham railway station =

Disused railway station in the East Riding of Yorkshire, England

Everingham
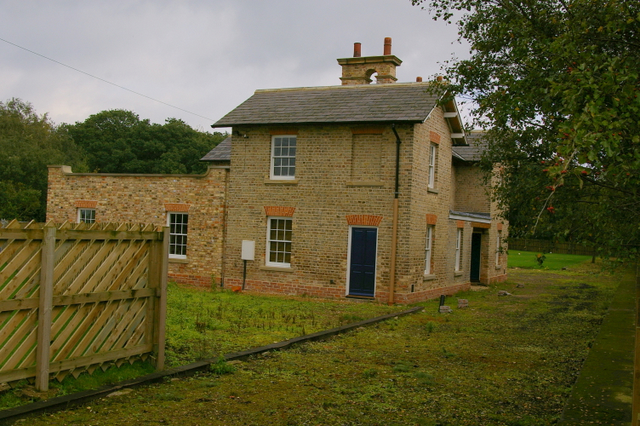
- Station house in 2006

General information
- Location: Harswell, East Riding of Yorkshire; England
- Coordinates: 53.850400°N 0.742500°W
- Grid reference: SE828401
- Platforms: 2

Other information
- Status: Disused

History
- Original company: York and North Midland Railway
- Pre-grouping: North Eastern Railway
- Post-grouping: London and North Eastern Railway; British Railways

Key dates
- 1853: Opened
- 1954: Closed
Location

Everingham railway station was a station on the Selby to Driffield Line in the East Riding of Yorkshire, England serving the hamlet of Harswell. It opened as Harswell Gate in 1853 and was renamed Everingham on 1 September 1874. It closed on 20 September 1954.

== See also ==
- Listed buildings in Holme-on-Spalding-Moor

Preceding station	Disused railways	Following station
Holme Moor	North Eastern Railway; Selby to Driffield Line	Market Weighton
