= Holmes House, South Duffield =

House in North Yorkshire, England

Coordinates: 53°47′06″N 0°56′39″W

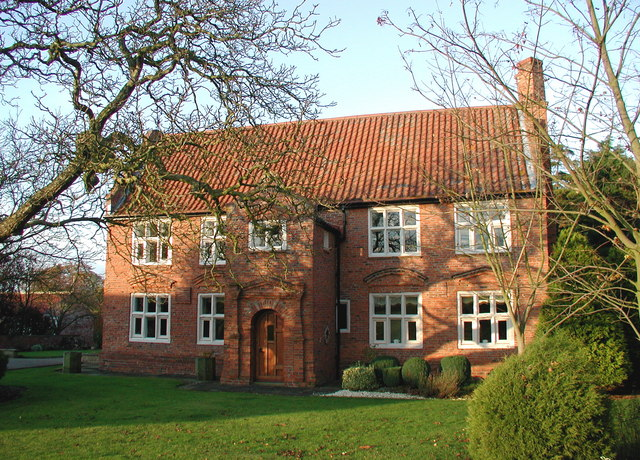
The house, in 2007

Holmes House is a historic building in South Duffield, a village in North Yorkshire, in England.

There was a building on the site in the medieval period, part of the moat of which survives. The current building was constructed in the early 17th century as a large farmhouse, in the Artisan Mannerist style. It was purchased by Michael Barstow in 1663, and remained in the family until 1926. There were various later alterations and additions, including a substantial late-20th century range at the rear. The building was Grade II* listed in 1966.

The house is built of brick, with a floor band, and a pantile roof with gable bands and a right curvilinear gable. It has two storeys and is five bays wide. The middle bay projects as a two-story gabled porch containing a round-arched doorway with engaged columns, imposts, and a moulded pediment. Above it is a two-light mullioned window with a pediment. The outer bays contain mullioned and transomed windows in round openings with cogged surrounds. The ground floor windows have triangular pediments in the outer bays and segmental pediments in the inner bays.

== See also ==
- Grade II* listed buildings in North Yorkshire (district)
- Listed buildings in Cliffe, Selby
