= Duffield Gate railway station =

Disused railway station in North Yorkshire, England

Duffield Gate
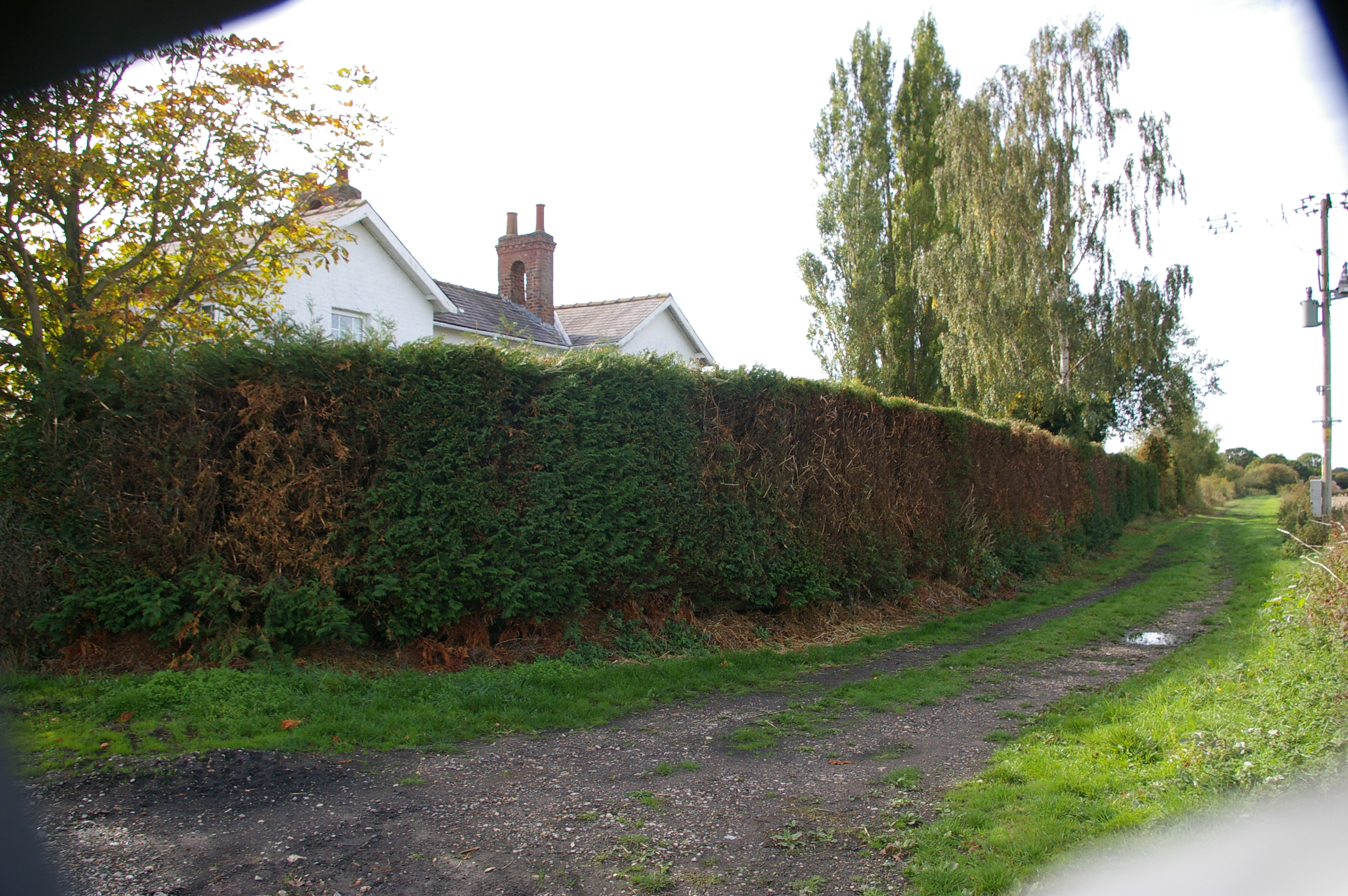
- Site of the former station (2018)

General information
- Location: South Duffield, North Yorkshire; England
- Coordinates: 53.800500°N 0.972000°W
- Grid reference: SE677343
- Platforms: 2

Other information
- Status: Disused

History
- Original company: York and North Midland Railway
- Pre-grouping: North Eastern Railway

Key dates
- 1848: Opened
- 1870: Closed
- 1871: Re-opened
- 1890: Closed
Location

Duffield Gate railway station was a station on the Selby to Driffield Line in North Yorkshire, England, serving the hamlet of South Duffield. It opened on 1 August 1848 as Duffield and closed in August 1870. It was then re-opened as Duffield Gate in May 1871 and closed 1 May 1890.

Preceding station	Disused railways	Following station
Cliff Common	NER; Selby to Driffield Line	Menthorpe Gate
