= Kirkburn Burial =

Iron Age warrior found in Yorkshire, England

The Kirkburn Burial is an Iron Age warrior burial dating from 250 BC–160 BC, discovered at Kirkburn, in the East Riding of Yorkshire, England. The burial was uncovered in an archaeological dig in 1987.

== Contents ==
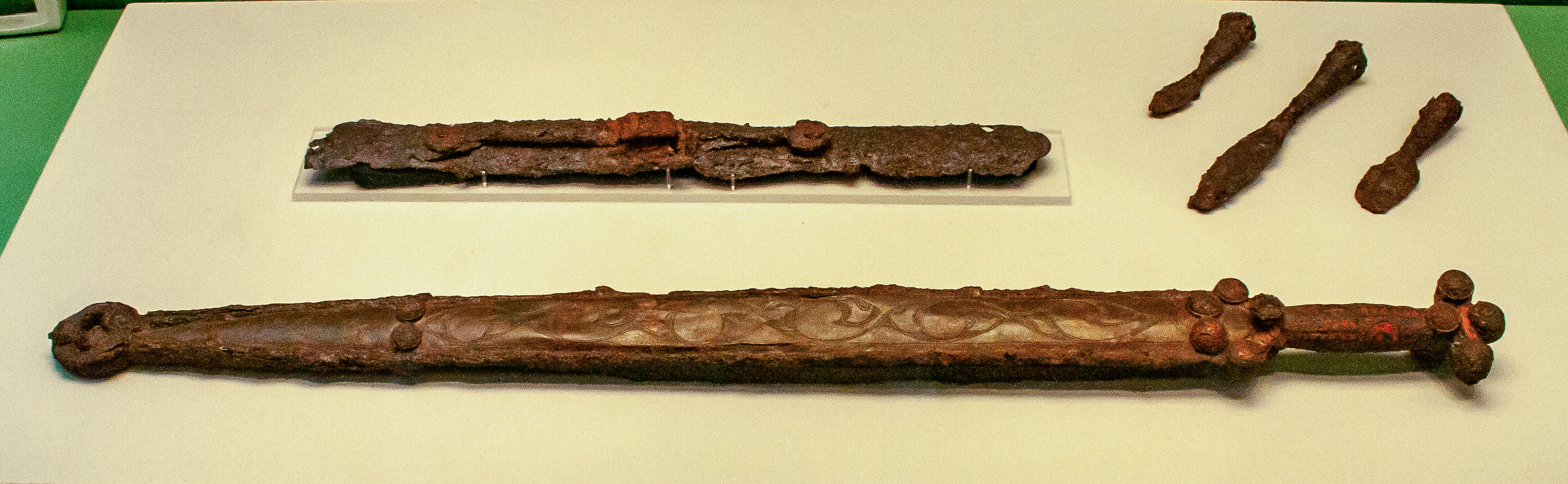
Kirkburn Sword in the British Museum

The grave contained the skeleton of a man in his late 20s to early 30s. He was placed in the grave in a crouched position with his knees pulled towards his chest. A sword and scabbard were positioned behind his back. As part of the burial rite the remains of a pig were placed on his chest. As a final act before the grave was filled in, three spears were thrust into the man's chest. This burial rite has been recorded in other graves from East Yorkshire (such as the Wetwang Slack burials) and was part of the ceremonies associated with burial.

The ornate iron sword, described by the British Museum as "probably the finest Iron Age sword in Europe" was around 69 centimetres long. The scabbard was constructed in two sections, a front plate of decorated copper alloy, and a rear plate of iron. The iron pommel of the sword was decorated with fine red glass beads, and the two handle sections, pommel and handle guard were attached with rivets. The handle guard was made of horn, and the handle itself is an iron tube decorated with glass enamelling.

Also found 11 meters away was a chariot burial containing a mail shirt, a rare find in Iron Age Britain. The mail shirt was of butted construction, with two mail shoulder flaps attached to a bronze central clasp.
