= Ouse and Derwent =

Coordinates: 53.830°N 0.993°W

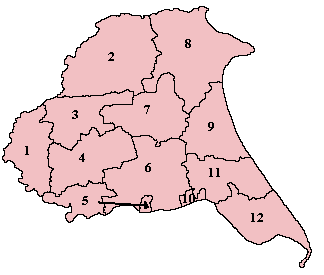
Wapentakes of the East Riding of Yorkshire. Ouse and Derwent is marked 1.

Ouse and Derwent was a wapentake of the historic East Riding of Yorkshire, England consisting of the westerly part of the county, between the River Ouse and the River Derwent. Established in medieval times, it ceased to have much significance in the 19th century when the wapentakes were superseded by other administrative divisions for most local government purposes.

The area of the wapentake was transferred to the North Yorkshire county council in 1974.
