= Harthill Wapentake =

Former administrative division of Yorkshire, England

Coordinates: 53.829°N 0.652°W

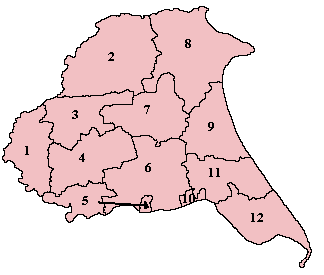
Wapentakes of the East Riding of Yorkshire. Bainton Beacon Division is marked 7, Holme Beacon Division is marked 4 Hunsley Beacon Division is marked 6 and Wilton Beacon Division is marked 3.

Harthill was a wapentake of the historic East Riding of Yorkshire, England consisting of the central part of the county. Established in medieval times, it ceased to have much significance in the 19th century, when the wapentakes were superseded by other administrative divisions for most local government purposes.

Because of its large area it was subdivided into four divisions—Bainton Beacon Division, Holme Beacon Division, Hunsley Beacon Division and Wilton Beacon Division.
