= North Duffield =

Village and civil parish in North Yorkshire, England

Coordinates: 53.82388°N 0.96239°W

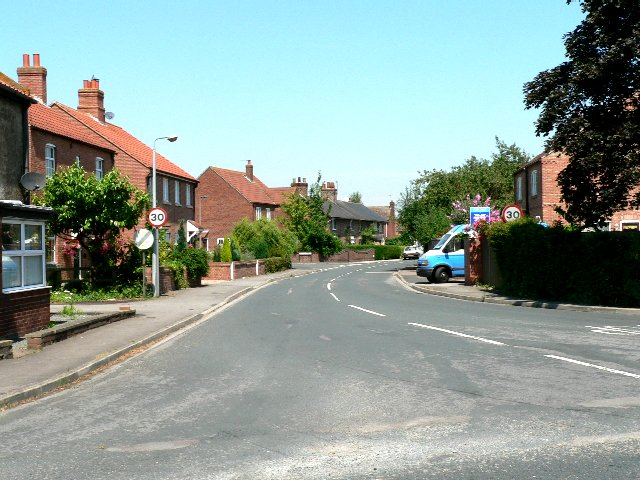
- Main Street, North Duffield

- Location within North Yorkshire
- Population: 1,317 (2011 census)
- OS grid reference: SE684369
- Civil parish: North Duffield
- Unitary authority: North Yorkshire
- Ceremonial county: North Yorkshire
- Region: Yorkshire and the Humber
- Country: England
- Sovereign state: United Kingdom
- Post town: SELBY
- Postcode district: YO8
- Police: North Yorkshire
- Fire: North Yorkshire
- Ambulance: Yorkshire
- UK Parliament: Selby

North Duffield is a village and civil parish in the county of North Yorkshire, England.

It lies about 4 miles (7 km) north-east of Selby and 11 miles (18 km) south-east of York, on the A163 road from Selby to Market Weighton. The River Derwent forms the eastern boundary of the parish. It has an area of around 10,080 acres (4,081 ha) (according to 2001 UK Census data). There are approximately 1,800 residents in the village, the majority of whom are aged between 30 and 50 years. The population at the 2011 Census was 1,317.

It was historically part of the East Riding of Yorkshire until 1974. From 1974 to 2023 it was part of the Selby District, it is now administered by the unitary North Yorkshire Council.

The name Duffield derives from the Old English dūfefeld meaning 'dove field'.

== Overview ==
North Duffield is home to a Community Primary School, Methodist Church, village hall, village green, hairdressers, garage, the black cat rescue, park, shop, pub, Duck pond, many fields, and a bowls club.

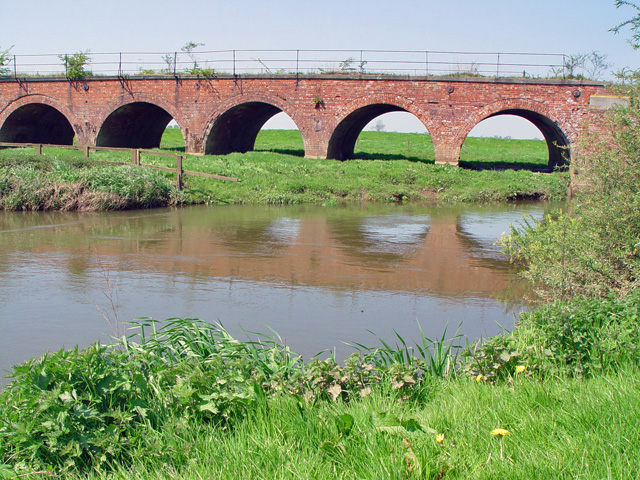
Railway bridge

There is an active North Duffield Conservation and local History Society, which in 2011 was funded by Lottery Funding. North Duffield has its own village football team, North Duffield Dragons, for children aged between 3 and 16.

Menthorpe Gate railway station on the Selby to Driffield Line served the village from 1853 to 1953.

== Governance ==
An electoral ward in the same name exists. This ward stretches north-east to Thorganby with a total population taken at the 2011 Census of 1,913.
