= Selby–Driffield line =

Former railway line in Yorkshire, England

The Selby–Driffield line formed part of a railway which connected the East Coast Main Line and the Yorkshire Coast Line. It crossed largely flat terrain and the Yorkshire Wolds and serviced the towns of Selby, Market Weighton, and Driffield.

== History ==
The line between Selby and Market Weighton was authorised by the York and North Midland Railway (East Riding Branches) (No. 2) Act 1846 (9 & 10 Vict. c. lxvi) and built by the York and North Midland Railway (Y&NMR).

The Y&NMR was one of the three original companies that came together the North-eastern Railway Company's Act 1854 (17 & 18 Vict. c. ccxi) to form the North Eastern Railway.

=== Scarborough, Bridlington and West Riding Junction Railway ===
Scarborough, Bridlington and West Riding Junction Railways Act 1885
- Act of Parliament
- Parliament of the United Kingdom
- Long title: An Act for incorporating the Scarborough Bridlington and West Riding Junction Railways Company and empowering them to make and maintain Railways in the North and East Ridings of the County of York and for other purposes.
- Citation: 48 & 49 Vict. c. clxxxi

Dates
- Royal assent: 6 August 1885

Scarborough, Bridlington and West Riding Junction Railways Act 1888
- Act of Parliament
- Parliament of the United Kingdom
- Long title: An Act to empower the Scarborough Bridlington and West Riding Junction Railways Company to abandon a portion of their authorised Railway No. 1 and to construct a new Railway instead thereof in the East Riding of the County of York; to extend the periods for the compulsory purchase of Lands for and for the completion of the remainder of their authorised Railways; to reduce the Capital of the Company, and for other purposes.
- Citation: 51 & 52 Vict. c. xxx

Dates
- Royal assent: 28 June 1888

Text of statute as originally enacted

Scarborough, Bridlington and West Riding Junction Railways Act 1891
- Act of Parliament
- Parliament of the United Kingdom
- Long title: An Act to authorise the abandonment of a portion of the Undertaking of the Scarborough Bridlington and West Riding Junction Railways Company and for other purposes.
- Citation: 54 & 55 Vict. c. xxxi

Dates
- Royal assent: 11 June 1891

Text of statute as originally enacted

The line between Driffield and Market Weighton was authorised by the Scarborough, Bridlington and West Riding Junction Railways Act 1885 (48 & 49 Vict. c. clxxxi) and built by the Scarborough, Bridlington and West Riding Junction Railway (SB&WRJR).

The SB&WRJR became part of the North Eastern Railway by the North Eastern Railway Act 1914 (4 & 5 Geo. 5. c. xcv).

== Stations ==
- Selby – opened 2 September 1834
- Cliff Common – opened 1853, closed regular services 20 September 1954, used by specials until 1957
- Duffield Gate – opened 1848, closed 1890
- Menthorpe Gate – opened 1853, closed 7 December 1953
- Bubwith – opened 1 August 1848, closed 20 September 1954
- High Field – opened 1854, closed 20 September 1954
- Foggathorpe – opened 1853, closed 20 September 1954
- Holme Moor – opened 1 August 1848, closed 20 September 1954
- Everingham – opened 1853, closed 20 September 1954
- Market Weighton – opened 4 October 1847, closed 29 November 1965
- Enthorpe – opened 1 May 1890, closed 20 September 1954
- Middleton-on-the-Wolds – opened 1 May 1890, closed 20 September 1954
- Bainton – opened 1 May 1890, closed 20 September 1954
- Southburn – opened 1 May 1890, closed 20 September 1954
- Driffield – opened 6 October 1846

== Closure ==
The line closed for regular passenger traffic on 20 September 1954, but a service of one regular non-stop train each way plus occasional summer excursions ran until June 1965. The line was abandoned after the last freight train ran later that year.
