= List of schools in the East Riding of Yorkshire =

This is a list of schools in the East Riding of Yorkshire, England.

== State-funded schools ==
=== Primary schools ===
- Acre Heads Primary School, Anlaby Common
- Airmyn Park Primary School, Airmyn
- Aldbrough Primary School, Aldbrough
- All Saints CE Infant Academy, Hessle
- All Saints CE Junior Academy, Hessle
- Anlaby Primary School, Anlaby
- Bacon Garth Primary School, Cottingham
- Barmby Moor CE Primary School, Barmby Moor
- Barmby-on-the-Marsh Primary School, Barmby on the Marsh
- Bay Primary School, Bridlington
- Beeford CE Primary School, Beeford
- Bempton Primary School, Bempton
- Beswick and Watton CE Primary School, Beswick
- Beverley Minster CE Primary School, Beverley
- Beverley St Nicholas Primary School, Beverley
- Bilton Community Primary School, Bilton
- Bishop Wilton CE Primary School, Bishop Wilton
- Boothferry Primary School, Boothferry
- Boynton Primary School, Boynton
- Brandesburton Primary School, Brandesburton
- Brough Primary School, Brough
- Bubwith Community Primary School, Bubwith
- Bugthorpe CE Primary School, Bugthorpe
- Burlington Infant School, Bridlington
- Burlington Junior School, Bridlington
- Burstwick Community Primary School, Burstwick
- Burton Agnes CE Primary School, Burton Agnes
- Burton Pidsea Primary School, Burton Pidsea
- Cherry Burton CE Primary School, Cherry Burton
- Cowick CE Primary School, East Cowick
- Croxby Primary School, Cottingham
- Driffield CE Infant School, Driffield
- Driffield Junior School, Driffield
- Dunswell Primary School, Dunswell
- Eastrington Primary School, Eastrington
- Elloughton Primary School, Elloughton
- Flamborough CE Primary School, Flamborough
- Garton-on-the-Wolds CE Primary School, Garton on the Wolds
- Gilberdyke Primary School, Gilberdyke
- Hallgate Primary School, Cottingham
- Hedon Primary School, Hedon
- Hessle Penshurst Primary School, Hessle
- Hilderthorpe Primary School, Bridlington
- Holme-upon-Spalding Moor Primary School, Holme-on-Spalding-Moor
- Hook CE Primary School, Hook
- Hornsea Burton Primary School, Hornsea
- Hornsea Community Primary School, Hornsea
- Howden CE Infant School, Howden
- Howden Junior School, Howden
- Hunsley Primary, Brough
- Hutton Cranswick Community Primary School, Hutton Cranswick
- Inmans Primary School, Hedon
- Keldmarsh Primary School, Beverley
- Keyingham Primary School, Keyingham
- Kilham CE Primary School, Kilham
- Kingsway Primary School, Goole
- Kirk Ella St Andrew's Community Primary School, Kirk Ella
- Leconfield Primary School, Leconfield
- Leven CE Primary School, Leven
- Little Weighton Rowley CE Primary School, Little Weighton
- Lockington CE Primary School, Lockington
- Market Weighton Infant School, Market Weighton
- Marshlands Primary School, Goole
- Martongate Primary School, Bridlington
- Melbourne Community Primary School, Melbourne
- Middleton-on-the-Wolds CE Primary School, Middleton on the Wolds
- Molescroft Primary School, Molescroft
- Mount Pleasant CE Junior School, Market Weighton
- Nafferton Primary School, Nafferton
- New Pasture Lane Primary School, Bridlington
- Newbald Primary School, North Newbald
- Newport Primary School, Newport
- North Cave CE Primary School, North Cave
- North Ferriby CE Primary School, North Ferriby
- North Frodingham Primary School, North Frodingham
- Northfield Infant School, Driffield
- Our Lady and St Peter RC Primary School, Bridlington
- Parkside Primary School, Goole
- Patrington CE Primary Academy, Patrington
- Paull Primary School, Paull
- Pocklington CE Infant School, Pocklington
- Pocklington Junior School, Pocklington
- Pollington-Balne CE Primary School, Pollington
- Preston Primary School, Preston
- Quay Academy, Bridlington
- Rawcliffe Bridge Primary School, Rawcliffe Bridge
- Rawcliffe Primary School, Rawcliffe
- Reedness Primary School, Reedness
- Riston CE Primary Academy, Long Riston
- Roos CE Primary School, Roos
- St John of Beverley RC Primary School, Beverley
- St Joseph's RC Primary School, Goole
- St Martin's CE Primary School, Fangfoss
- St Mary and St Joseph RC Primary School, Pocklington
- St Mary's CE Primary School, Beverley
- St Mary's RC Primary School, Market Weighton
- Sigglesthorne CE Primary Academy, Sigglesthorne
- Skidby CE Primary School, Skidby
- Skipsea Primary School, Skipsea
- Skirlaugh CE Primary School, Skirlaugh
- Sledmere CE Primary School, Sledmere
- Snaith Primary School, Snaith
- South Cave CE Primary School, South Cave
- Springhead Primary School, Anlaby
- Sproatley Endowed CE Academy, Sproatley
- Stamford Bridge Primary School, Stamford Bridge
- Sutton upon Derwent CE Primary School, Sutton upon Derwent
- Swanland Primary School, Swanland
- Swinefleet Primary School, Swinefleet
- Swinemoor Primary School, Beverley
- Thorngumbald Primary School, Thorngumbald
- Tickton Primary School, Tickton
- Walkington Primary School, Walkington
- Warter CE Primary School, Warter
- Wawne Primary School, Wawne
- Welton Primary School, Welton
- Westfield Primary School, Cottingham
- Wetwang CE Primary School, Wetwang
- Wilberfoss CE Primary School, Wilberfoss
- Willerby Carr Lane Primary School, Willerby
- Withernsea Primary School, Withernsea
- Wold Newton Foundation School, Wold Newton
- Woodmansey CE Primary School, Woodmansey

=== Secondary schools ===
- Beverley Grammar School, Beverley
- Beverley High School, Beverley
- Bridlington School, Bridlington
- Cottingham High School, Cottingham
- Driffield School, Driffield
- Goole Academy, Goole
- Headlands School, Bridlington
- Hessle High School, Hessle
- Holderness Academy, Preston
- Hornsea School and Language College, Hornsea
- Howden School, Howden
- Longcroft School, Beverley
- The Market Weighton School, Market Weighton
- The Snaith School, Snaith
- South Hunsley School, Melton
- Withernsea High School, Withernsea
- Woldgate School and Sixth Form College, Pocklington
- Wolfreton School, Willerby

=== Special and alternative schools ===
- The Hub School, Anlaby Common
- Kings Mill School, Driffield
- Riverside Special School, Goole
- St Anne's School, Welton

=== Further education ===
- Bishop Burton College, Beverley
- East Riding College, Beverley

== Independent schools ==
=== Senior and all-through schools ===
- Pocklington School, Pocklington
- Tranby School, Anlaby

=== Special and alternative schools ===
- The Becklands, Market Weighton
- Cambian Beverley School, Beverley
- Compass Community School Seacole Park, Beverley
- Falcons Learning, Goole
- Horton House School, Wawne
- Sycamore House School, Withernsea
