= Cowick =

Cowick may refer to:

- Cowick, Devon
- East Cowick, Yorkshire
- West Cowick, Yorkshire
- Cowick Hall, Yorkshire
