= West Cowick =

Village in the East Riding of Yorkshire, England

Coordinates: 53.6860°N 1.0167°W

- Location within the East Riding of Yorkshire Location within the East Riding of Yorkshire
- OS grid reference: SE650215
- Civil parish: Snaith and Cowick
- Unitary authority: East Riding of Yorkshire
- Ceremonial county: East Riding of Yorkshire
- Region: Yorkshire and the Humber
- Country: England
- Sovereign state: United Kingdom
- Post town: Goole
- Postcode district: DN14
- Dialling code: 01405
- Police: Humberside
- Fire: Humberside
- Ambulance: Yorkshire
- UK Parliament: Goole and Pocklington

West Cowick is a village located in the civil parish of Snaith and Cowick in the East Riding of Yorkshire, England. It lies in low-lying farmland within the Humberhead Levels.

To the east is Cowick Hall, a late seventeenth-century country house listed at Grade I and now the headquarters of Croda International. On 14 June 1323 the Crown issued Exchequer ordinances from Cowick. West Cowick is identified as a production centre for Humber ware pottery, and a 2024 peer-reviewed study analyses the local shift from green to purple glazed wares.

== Geography ==
West Cowick stands within the Humberhead Levels, a low-lying agricultural plain of large, geometric fields drained by ditches. Water levels are managed by pumped systems across the area. The village lies in the drainage district run by the Cowick and Snaith Internal Drainage Board, where the tidal River Aire forms the northern boundary and an engineered network of drains feeds the Aire and Ouse system.

The wider setting forms part of East Riding landscape zones around Goole and the Humberhead Levels, described as intensively farmed and dependent on managed drainage and washlands.

== History ==
=== Medieval manor and royal government ===
The scheduled moated platform known as King’s Manor, south of Little London, marks the centre of the medieval manor at Cowick. The manor passed to the Crown with the Lancastrian inheritance in 1322. Accounts from Edward II’s household record new roofing and fireplaces and the digging of a wide defensive ditch in the summer of 1323. On 14 June 1323 the Crown issued Exchequer ordinances from Cowick, a dated sign of royal business carried out at the manor. Snaith appears in the Domesday Book as a settlement in Osgodcross hundred, which frames the early context for the area in which West Cowick later developed.

=== Pottery and craft ===
West Cowick was a production centre for Humber ware in the later medieval period. Excavations and materials analysis link the village to kiln activity and to a fifteenth century shift from green to purple glazed wares. A 2024 peer reviewed study examines the technology used by local potters to produce the purple glaze.

=== Rivers, drainage and crossing the Aire ===
From the seventeenth century large drainage schemes reshaped low ground around Snaith and Cowick. Works associated with Cornelius Vermuyden and the later Hatfield Chase Corporation altered watercourses and enabled more intensive farming across the Humberhead Levels. Acts of Parliament from 1699 created and extended the Aire and Calder Navigation, improving the movement of goods along the Aire and towards the Humber.

Crossing the River Aire also changed. In the 1770s an Act allowed Thomas Stapleton of Carlton to replace the ferry with a toll bridge designed by John Carr of York. In 1927 the toll bridge was replaced by the single-span steel Pratt truss Carlton New Bridge, built by Sir William Arrol and Co. with concrete approach viaducts by Mouchel to carry the modern A1041 road.

=== Enclosure and estate development ===
Parliamentary enclosure reorganised open fields and commons in the late eighteenth century. An enclosure award for Snaith and Cowick was made in 1781. In the same period the estate landscape between East and West Cowick was reshaped around Cowick Hall, a late seventeenth century house later altered by James Paine and Joseph Bonomi.

=== Local industry ===
A wind powered corn mill stood at West Cowick by the early nineteenth century. Deed evidence and local archaeology record a tower mill site that worked through the Victorian period before going out of use in the twentieth century.

=== Administrative changes ===
The township and parish have experienced several reorganisations of local government. From 1894, it was included in the Goole Rural District in the West Riding of Yorkshire. In 1974, it became part of the Boothferry district of Humberside. Since 1996, it has been part of the East Riding of Yorkshire unitary authority.

== Landmarks ==
Cowick Hall is a late seventeenth-century country house on Snaith Road between East Cowick and West Cowick. It is designated as Grade I on the National Heritage List for England and was built for Sir John Dawnay, who later became Viscount Downe. The house was altered in the eighteenth century by James Paine and again in the early nineteenth century by Joseph Bonomi. It is now the headquarters of Croda International.

Several estate structures are separately listed at Grade II, including the coach house and stable range east of the hall, the dower house to the north-east, and the east lodge on Snaith Road.

A second focus of historic interest is the scheduled moated site known as King’s Manor, south of Little London, marking the location of the medieval royal manor associated with Cowick.

Archaeological work has also identified the site of a former wind-powered corn mill at West Cowick. Deed evidence suggests the mill was established in the early nineteenth century and worked through the Victorian period before falling out of use.

== Economy ==
Farming dominates land use around West Cowick and is supported by managed drainage within the Cowick and Snaith internal drainage district. The main employer presence nearby is at Cowick Hall, where Croda International maintains its corporate headquarters and registered office.

== Transport ==
West Cowick is linked by local roads to Snaith and neighbouring villages. The nearest railway station is in Snaith, which is on the Pontefract Line. Bus services connect the village to Selby and Goole via Arriva Yorkshire service 401.

== Governance ==
West Cowick is in the civil parish of Snaith and Cowick, which is served by Snaith and Cowick Town Council as the first tier of local government. For local services it is within the East Riding of Yorkshire Council area and lies in the Snaith, Airmyn, Rawcliffe and Marshland ward. For national representation it is in the Goole and Pocklington constituency, created for the July 2024 general election following the 2023 boundary review.

== Demography ==
West Cowick’s population figures are included in the civil parish of Snaith and Cowick. On Census Day 27 March 2011 the parish had 3,579 usual residents, rising to 3,865 at the 2021 Census.

== Education ==
Primary education is provided at Cowick Church of England Voluntary Controlled Primary School in East Cowick. The school was graded Good by Ofsted in March 2023.

For secondary education pupils normally travel to The Snaith School on Pontefract Road in Snaith. It is an academy and admissions are coordinated through East Riding of Yorkshire Council.

== Notable people ==
- John Dawnay, 1st Viscount Downe (c. 1625–1695), politician and peer, for whom Cowick Hall was built.

== Flooding ==
West Cowick lies within a managed drainage landscape of pumped ditches and washlands. During late February and early March 2020 prolonged rainfall filled the River Aire washlands and led to flooding across the civil parish. Flood warnings were issued for Snaith Ings and for the River Don and Dutch River catchments affecting East and West Cowick. The Environment Agency recorded that the washlands reached capacity and overspilled, and that Snaith Ings overtopped via an ancillary spillway at East Cowick. A multi-agency response involved Humberside Fire and Rescue Service, East Riding of Yorkshire Council and internal drainage boards, with pumping and road closures reported during the incident. East Riding of Yorkshire Council opened a Section 19 investigation and the parish council submitted evidence and photographs. In June 2020 the Environment Agency announced a programme of repairs to embankments and structures in the lower River Aire washlands.

== See also ==
- Listed buildings in Snaith and Cowick
- Cowick Hall
- East Cowick
- Hatfield Chase
- Humber ware
- Humberhead Levels
- River Aire
- Snaith
- Snaith railway station
