= Frederick Wood (industrialist) =

- Born: May 30, 1926; Goole, Yorkshire
- Died: March 29, 2003 (aged 76)
- Education: Clare College, Cambridge
- Occupation: Businessman

Sir Frederick ("Fred") Ambrose Stuart Wood (30 May 1926 - 9 March 2003) was a prominent businessman and industrialist most renowned for overseeing the rapid growth of Croda International.

== Early life ==
Fred Wood was born on 30 May 1926 in Goole, Yorkshire. Fred attended Felsted School subsequently gaining a place to study at Clare College, University of Cambridge, his time at which was cut short by military service obligations. In 1944 he joined the Fleet Air Arm, a branch of the British Royal Navy responsible for the operation of naval aircraft, completing his training in America and the Caribbean.

== Early career and role in the establishment of Croda International ==
In 1925 Wood's great uncle, George Crowe entered into a partnership to produce lanolin, a fatty substance found in sheep's wool used widely as a base ingredient in lubricants and cosmetics. This new enterprise was named Croda and established at Rawcliffe Bridge, outside Goole, Yorkshire. In 1927 Fred's father, Philip Wood became the manager of the new factory and made improvements to the production process, during the 1930s, to satisfy meet growing demand for lanolin.

Following his demobilisation in 1947 Fred Wood returned to join Croda as a management trainee. When Philip died two years later in 1949, aged 46, a committee of directors assumed responsibility for managing the business, with Fred acting as sales director. A year later, in 1950, Fred re-located to New York City to establish an overseas office. Fred quickly established a US business with turnover of over £100,000 and three years later, aged 27, returned to the UK to assume the position of Managing Director, with the support of Chairman George Crowe.

Croda was still a relatively modest enterprise however Wood returned from his time overseas with what he termed "a dose of profit orientation" and ambitious growth plans for Croda. He concentrated company strategy on specialised high-margin products – in particular ingredients for premium beauty products – and move away from low-margin, high-volume production of lanolin. As Croda began to grow quickly it moved to its current headquarters at Cowick Hall, a Georgian mansion in Snaith, Yorkshire.

During his time in abroad Wood had also developed a fondness for American style which quickly made him a recognisable figure in 1950s Yorkshire. He owned a yellow Buick convertible, and learnt to pilot the company plane. Well-tailored and tall he quickly developed a reputation as a dynamic business leader. At one time Fred harboured political ambitions however an unsuccessful experience as a Conservative Party parliamentary candidate for Middlesbrough East in 1962 and again in 1964 convinced him to re-focus his energy on Croda.

== Growth of Croda and later career ==
In 1960 Fred Wood became Chairman as well as Managing Director and in 1964 oversaw the initial public listing of Croda. Boosted by Croda's strong growth record the share price grew steadily enabling Wood to undertake a series of acquisitions, notably United Premier Oil in 1967 and British Glues & Chemicals in 1968. Croda was becoming a truly international business – between 1964 and 1971 new ventures were launched in many new territories including Italy, Germany, Japan, Canada, Australia, South Africa, Brazil and France. Croda's profits, £10,000 at the start of Wood’s tenure, grew steadily passing £1 million in 1969. At the time of Fred’s retirement in 1986 group profits exceeded £20 million, supported by a global workforce of over 6,000.

His successful stewardship of Croda attracted attention in the world of Politics and in 1972 the Conservative government of Edward Heath approached him to take charge of the newly formed National Bus Company, an entity created from a collection of disparate regional services. Under Wood's chairmanship, between 1972 and 1978, the National Express inter-city network was launched under a new white livery with an eye-catching chevron logo. It boasted competitive fares from re-developed city-centre locations, such as London Victoria. Structural losses in early years were replaced by a robust surplus in his final year as Chairman. In recognition of his public service Wood was knighted in 1977.

After the return of a Conservative government in 1979, Wood's success with the bus company led to him being approached, in 1981, to oversee a complex reorganisation process at the National Enterprise Board, merging it with the National Research Development Corporation. In 1983, the new combined body was privatised to become the British Technology Group (BTG).

The role at the BTG marked the end of Wood's public service, and he stepped down as chairman of Croda three years later, due to the continued onset of Parkinson's disease.
