= Gowdall =

Village and civil parish in the East Riding of Yorkshire, England

Coordinates: 53.694117°N 1.058651°W

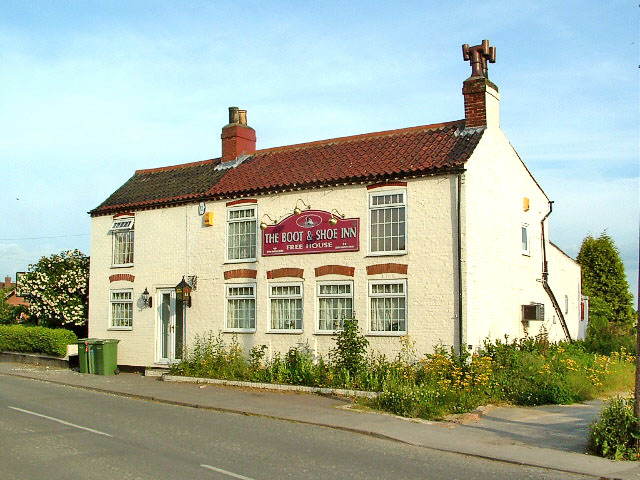
- Boot & Shoe Inn, Gowdall

- Location within the East Riding of Yorkshire
- Population: 356 (2011 census)
- OS grid reference: SE622223
  - London: 155 mi (249 km) SSE
- Civil parish: Gowdall
- Unitary authority: East Riding of Yorkshire
- Ceremonial county: East Riding of Yorkshire
- Region: Yorkshire and the Humber
- Country: England
- Sovereign state: United Kingdom
- Post town: GOOLE
- Postcode district: DN14
- Dialling code: 01405
- Police: Humberside
- Fire: Humberside
- Ambulance: Yorkshire
- UK Parliament: Goole and Pocklington

Gowdall is a village and civil parish in the East Riding of Yorkshire, England. It is situated approximately 1 mile (1.6 km) west of the town of Snaith, 1 mile to the north of the M62 motorway and the A645 road, and just south of the River Aire.

According to the 2011 UK Census, Gowdall parish had a population of 356, an increase on the 2001 UK Census figure of 318.

== Toponymy ==
The name "Gowdall" originates from Old English. It translates as "Nook of land where marigolds grow", and is composed of the elements golde ("marigold") and halh ("nook of land"). The village was not mentioned in the Domesday Book but was recorded as Goldale sometime in the 12th century.

== History ==
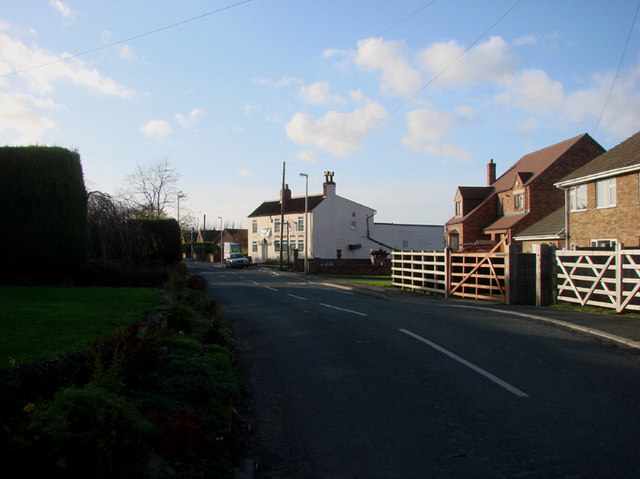
Main Street, Gowdall

The parish was part of the Goole Rural District in the West Riding of Yorkshire from 1894 to 1974, then in Boothferry district of Humberside until 1996.

In 2000 the village was severely flooded, and made national news. In February 2020, Gowdall along with other villages surrounding Snaith suffered from further flooding after the River Aire "over-topped".

Each October, before 2017 when the annual festival permanently ceased to occur, Gowdall residents hosted a 'Scarecrow and Pumpkin Festival'.

The village formerly had a public house called The Boot and Shoe Inn. It has been closed since 2018.
