= Snaith Priory =

Monastery in the East Riding of Yorkshire, England

Priory Church of St Laurence, Snaith
- The Priory Church of Saint Laurence
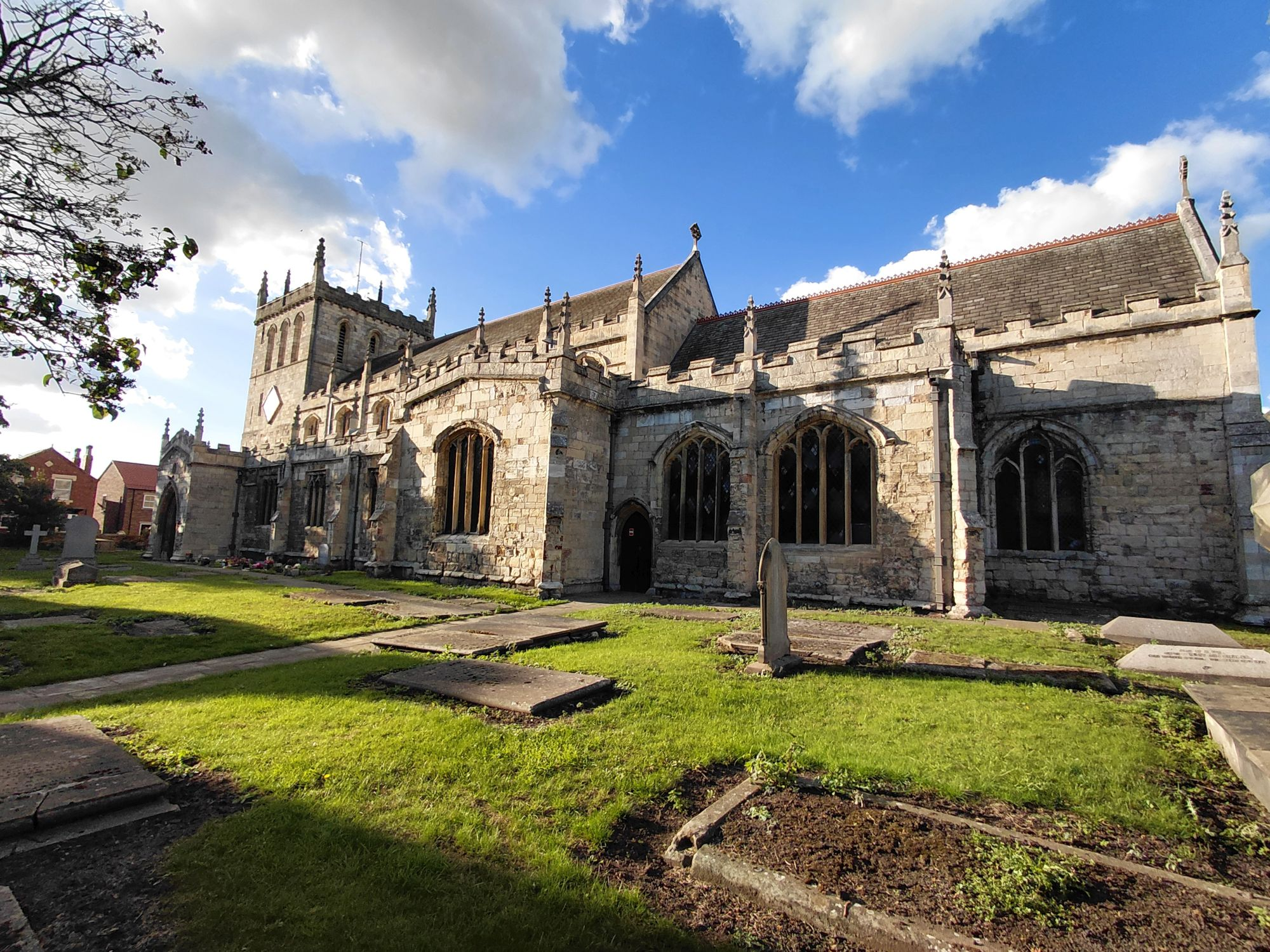
- Priory Church of St Laurence, Snaith
- Priory Church of St Laurence, Snaith
- 53.6923°N 1.0287°W
- OS grid reference: SE641221
- Location: Market Place, Snaith, East Riding of Yorkshire, DN14 9HE
- Country: England
- Denomination: Church of England

History
- Status: Active parish church
- Founded: 11th century

Architecture
- Style: Norman, Early English, and Perpendicular Gothic

Administration
- Diocese: Diocese of Sheffield
- Archdeaconry: Archdeaconry of Doncaster
- Benefice: Snaith and Carlton

Listed Building – Grade I
- Designated: 14 February 1967
- Reference no.: 1161899

The Priory Church of St Laurence, Snaith (commonly known as Snaith Priory) is an active Church of England parish church located in the market town of Snaith, East Riding of Yorkshire, England. Originating in the 11th century as a cell of the Benedictine Selby Abbey, the present building exhibits architectural work spanning the Norman, Early English, and Perpendicular Gothic periods. The church was designated a Grade I listed building on 14 February 1967.

== History ==
=== Monastic origins (11th–12th centuries) ===
The ecclesiastical history of Snaith dates to the late 11th century. Around 1100, King Henry I granted the church of Snaith and its surrounding manor to the Benedictine monks of Selby Abbey. Selby Abbey established a small monastic cell (priory) at Snaith, with two or three monks residing locally to oversee the abbey's agricultural estates and administer spiritual care to the parish.

=== Peculiar jurisdiction ===
Snaith Priory held a rare administrative status known as a royal peculiar (and later an exempt jurisdiction under Selby Abbey). The Abbot of Selby held sole jurisdiction over probate, matrimonial causes, and ecclesiastical law within the parish, independent of the Archbishop of York. This peculiar jurisdiction persisted until the 19th century.

=== Post-Reformation and local gentry ===
Following the Dissolution of the Monasteries in 1539, the priory was suppressed and Selby Abbey's rights passed to lay impropriators. The church became the primary burial site for several prominent local landowning families, most notably the Dawnay family of nearby Cowick Hall and the Yarburgh family of Heslington and Snaith.

Substantial restorations took place in the Victorian era, including structural repairs overseen by architect Sir George Gilbert Scott in 1867–1868.

== Administrative history ==
=== The Peculiar Court of Snaith ===
From the 12th century until the abolition of exempt jurisdictions in the 19th century, Snaith Priory operated as the center of the Peculiar Court of Snaith. Granted by royal charter and managed under the authority of the Abbot of Selby Abbey, the parish was exempt from the jurisdiction of the Archbishop of York.

The court held full authority over administrative and ecclesiastical matters across the entire Soke of Snaith—including the townships of Cowick, Pollington, Heck, Hensall, and Whitley. Proceedings were conducted within the north aisle of the church, where a surviving 17th-century oak screen marks the former position of the Consistory Court.

== Architecture ==
Snaith Priory is an exceptionally large parish church, constructed of limestone ashlar with slate roofs. Its layout comprises a west tower, a six-bay nave with north and south aisles, north and south porches, and a three-bay chancel flanked by side chapels.

=== West Tower ===
The lower stages of the west tower represent the oldest surviving fabric, dating to the late 12th-century Norman transition period. The upper belfry stage was added in the 15th century in the Perpendicular style, featuring embattled parapets, gargoyles, and crocketed corner pinnacles.

=== Nave, Chancel and Chapels ===
==== Nave ====
The nave arcades feature 13th-century octagonal piers supporting pointed arches. The clerestory and timber roof trusses date from 15th-century Perpendicular alterations.

==== Chancel & Chapels ====
The chancel is flanked by two private chantry chapels.The north chapel (the Dawnay Chapel) served as the private chantry and burial space for the Dawnay family of Cowick Hall, later Viscounts Downe. Beneath the chapel floor lies the family vault. Notable monuments within the chapel include:

- The chest tomb of Sir John Dawnay (d. 1631), featuring sculpted armorial bearings and classical detailing.
- A preserved 17th-century funeral helmet, crest, and gauntlets mounted high on the north wall, associated with the heraldic burial rites of the Dawnay family.

The south chapel contains significant monuments to the Yarburgh family of Snaith Hall. The standout feature is a life-sized white marble monument by sculptor Sir Francis Chantrey, carved in 1837 to commemorate Lady Louisa Maria Dawnay, Viscountess Downe (d. 1835).

Other notable monuments and fittings include:

- A white marble recumbent monument by Sir Francis Chantrey commemorating Lady Dawnay.
- The Dawnay chapel preserves a 17th-century funeral helm and gauntlets mounted on the north wall.
- A 13th-century tub font resting on a modern octagonal base.

=== Restoration ===
Between 1867 and 1868, the church underwent an extensive restoration directed by Sir George Gilbert Scott. The work included re-pitching the nave roof, opening the tower arch to the nave, stabilizing the 13th-century arcades, and installing modern heating while preserving the medieval parclose screens.

== See also ==
- Grade I listed churches in the East Riding of Yorkshire
- Listed buildings in Snaith and Cowick
