= Mark Gregory =

Mark Gregory may refer to:

- Mark Gregory (garden designer)
- Mark Gregory (actor)
