= Snaith and Cowick =

Civil parish in the East Riding of Yorkshire, England

Coordinates: 53.695°N 1.025°W

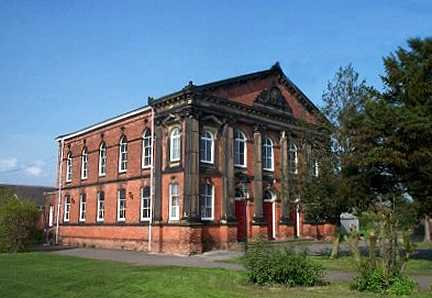
- Wesleyan Methodist Chapel in Snaith

- Population: 3,579 (2011 Census)
- OS grid reference: SE640220
- Civil parish: Snaith and Cowick
- Unitary authority: East Riding of Yorkshire
- Ceremonial county: East Riding of Yorkshire
- Region: Yorkshire and the Humber
- Country: England
- Sovereign state: United Kingdom
- Post town: GOOLE
- Postcode district: DN14
- Dialling code: 01405
- Police: Humberside
- Fire: Humberside
- Ambulance: Yorkshire
- UK Parliament: Goole and Pocklington

Snaith and Cowick is a civil parish in the East Riding of Yorkshire, England. It is situated approximately 6 miles (9.7 km) west of the town of Goole and covers an area of 2,406.612 hectares (5,946.87 acres).

The civil parish is formed by the town of Snaith and the villages of East Cowick and West Cowick. According to the 2011 UK census, Snaith and Cowick had a population of 3,579, an increase on the 2001 UK census figure of 3,028.

The parish was part of the Goole Rural District in the West Riding of Yorkshire from 1894 to 1974, then in Boothferry district of Humberside until 1996.

== See also ==
- Listed buildings in Snaith and Cowick
