= Croda International =

British chemicals company

Croda International plc
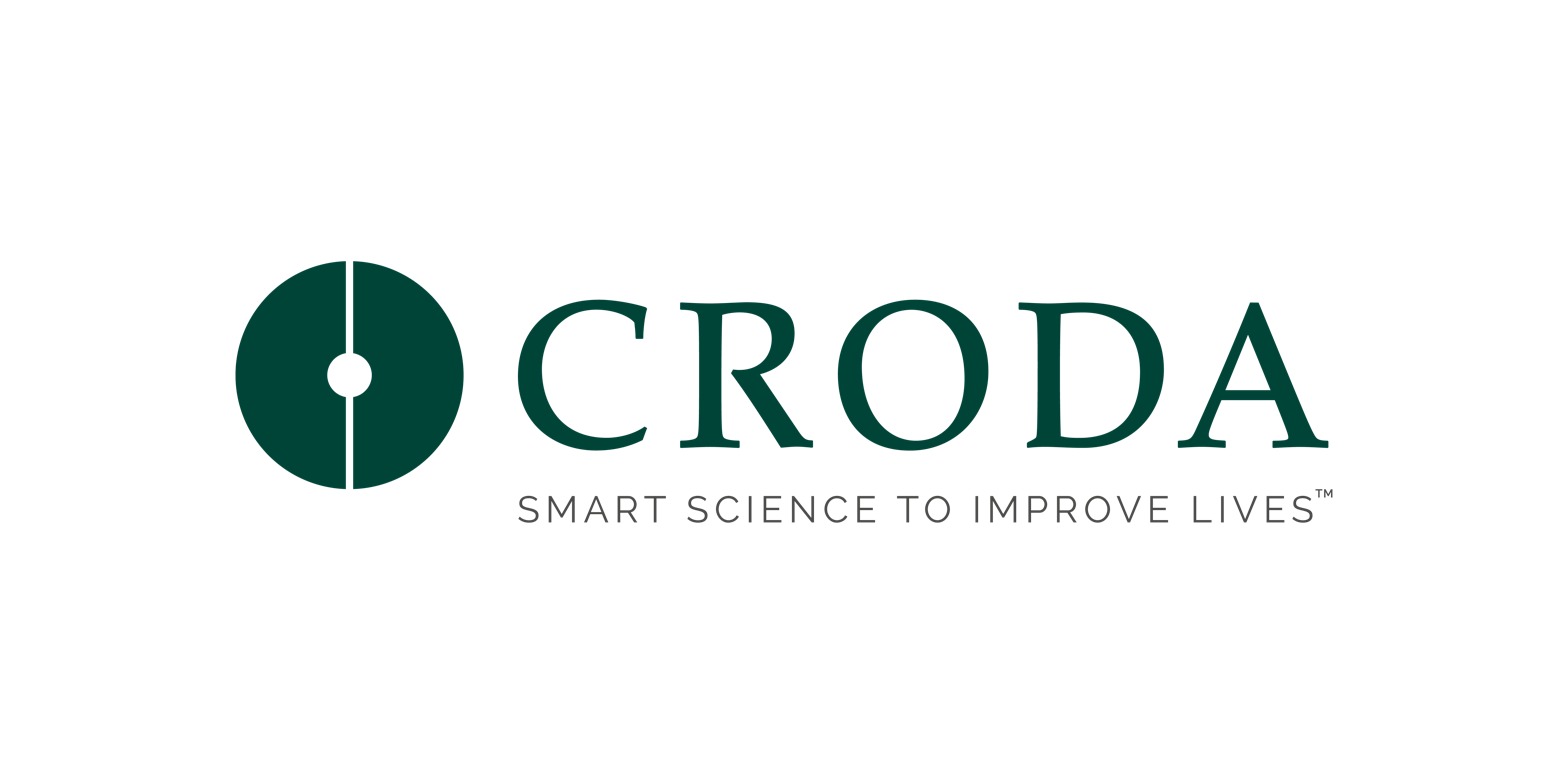

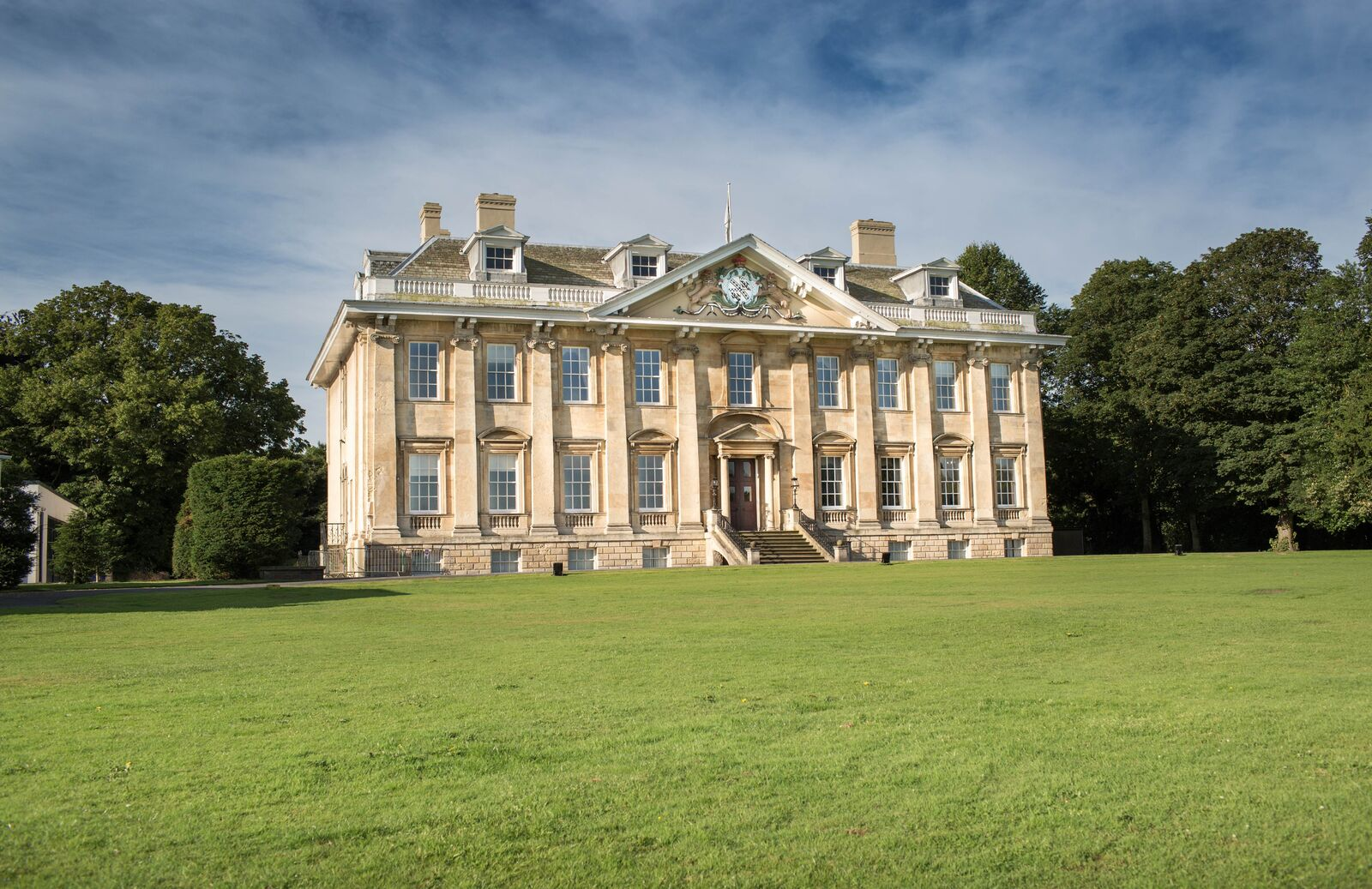
- Headquarters of Croda International, Cowick Hall, lying midway between West and East Cowick
- Type: Public limited company
- Traded as: LSE: CRDA; FTSE 100 Component
- Industry: Chemicals
- Founded: 1925; 101 years ago
- Founders: George William Crowe; Henry James Dawe
- Headquarters: East Cowick, East Yorkshire, England, United Kingdom
- Number of locations: 37
- Key people: Danuta Gray (Chair); Steve Foots (CEO)
- Products: Speciality Chemicals
- Revenue: ▲£1,699.4 million (2025)
- Operating income: ▲£295.3 million (2025)
- Net income: ▼£64.7 million (2025)
- Number of employees: 6,100 (2026)
- Website: www.croda.com

Croda International plc is a British speciality chemicals company based at Snaith, England. It is listed on the London Stock Exchange.

== History ==
The company was founded by George William Crowe and Henry James Dawe in 1925. Crowe bought an abandoned waterworks facility at Rawcliffe Bridge for £7, which would later be used to manufacture the company's first barrels of lanolin, a natural protective fat present in sheep's wool. The company was named Croda (a combination of the first few letters of his surname with that of his partner, Dawe).

Crowe and Dawe began working on a process to extract lanolin from sheep’s wool for various industries, including uses in cosmetics, as a waterproofing agent, and as a dressing for leather. At the time, the UK imported lanolin, having no domestic lanolin production at all. Dawe's extraction process failed initially and Dawe left the company. Philip Wood, Crowe's nephew, was appointed manager of the site in 1925, and Wood worked closely with a Belgian chemist to develop a new extraction process. By the end of the year Croda had successfully produced its first batch of lanolin.

The company struggled to remain profitable to the end of the decade until a report from the National Physical Laboratory was published describing the rust prevention properties of lanolin, which created new business opportunities for the company. The lanolin market was still in its infancy as the World Depression began to take hold in Britain, but Croda was able to expand their domestic market and exports through the 1930s as Wood refined Dawe's production process and gradually developed a wider range of product applications for lanolin.

During the Second World War, Croda participated in Britain's war economy; specifically, it was involved in the production of camouflage paints, gun lubricants and cleaning oils, insect repellents, and various other resources that were needed across the British Empire. It was in the aftermath of the Second World War that the firm turned to the cosmetics sector.

During 1949, Phlip Wood died; thereafter, the board decided to run the business by committee while Wood's son Fred Wood was appointed sales director. One year later, Fred relocated to New York to set up the company's US subsidiary, Croda Inc. In 1953, Fred returned to the UK and was appointed Croda's managing director at the age of 27. Under Fred Wood's management, Croda experienced a sustained period of rapid growth. During the 1950s, several major cosmetics companies started using its products; at the same time, the firm also began to expand internationally: it moved to its present location in 1956. During 1957, Croda Inc. acquired Hummel Chemical Company and began manufacturing in a new plant in Newark, New Jersey.

In 1964, the company was listed on the London Stock Exchange for the first time. Throughout the 1960s, it expanded rapidly; to this end, it acquired United Premier Oil in 1967 and British Glues & Chemicals in 1968. During 1970, Croda acquired L&H Holdings and A B Fleming for ink and synthetic resin production and acquired Midland-Yorkshire Tar Distillers in 1975.

In 1990, it developed Lorenzo's oil, a product famously used to treat adrenoleukodystrophy. In July 1997, Croda acquired the Paris-based STOA Group for $66 million. One year later, the firm bought Westbrook Lanolin.

During the early 21st century, the company concentrated on speciality chemicals. In November 2003, it signed a global distribution and collaboration agreement with the New Zealand-based wool biotechnology company Keratec. During June 2006, Croda announced that it had reached a deal with ICI to acquire ICI's Uniqema for a total consideration of £410 million. Three years later, Croda announced the closure of its Wilton facility as a result of the separate decision by Dow Chemical to close an adjoining facility that made it uneconomic to continue production.

Throughout the 2010s, the firm continued to acquire other entities; speaking in 2016, Steve Foots, the then-CEO of Croda, openly stated that the firm had a wishlist of four large targets for acquisition that it would be prepared to pay in excess of £1 billion for. During February 2018, Croda announced that terms had been agreed to purchase the agricultural bioscience business Plant Impact for £10 million; that same year, it also acquired the adjuvant producer Brenntag Biosector from the Danish business Brenntag Nordic in exchange for £65 million, and launched a new range of wholly renewable and bio-based non-ionic surfactants.

In November 2020, it was announced that Croda was in the process of purchasing Spanish home-products specialist Iberchem in exchange for €820 million; this move was intended to increase the company's sales of fragrance formulations in various markets including China and the Middle East. One year later, it purchased a 93 per cent stake in Parfex, a French fragrance business, for €45 million. During March 2022, the firm was awarded a grant of £15.9 million with the aim of increasing Britain’s manufacturing capacity of specialty lipids; after which the firm announced that it would invest £31 million in the expansion of its vaccine manufacturing site in Leek. That same year, it completed the sale of the majority of its Performance Technologies and Industrial Chemicals (PTIC) division to raise £667 million.

== Operations ==
The company's products include:

- Surfactants which are used as ingredients for cosmetic creams and lotions.
- Dietary supplements containing speciality lipids, such as omega-3 oils.
- Fatty acid amides which add "slip" to plastic surfaces, so plastic bags can be peeled apart easily.

These products are sold to other manufacturing companies. Croda has factories in the United Kingdom, France, Spain, Italy, the Netherlands, the United States, Brazil, Singapore, India, Indonesia, Korea, and Japan.
