= St John the Baptist's Church, Pollington =

Church in Yorkshire, England

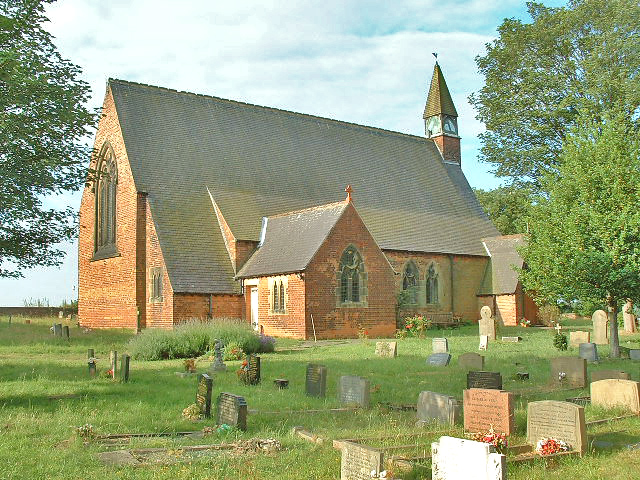
The church, in 2006

St John the Baptist's Church is an Anglican church in Pollington, a village in the East Riding of Yorkshire, in England.

Pollington was long in the parish of Snaith Priory. In the mid-19th century, Anglican services were held in a barn in the village. William Dawnay, 7th Viscount Downe funded the construction of a church, vicarage and school in the village, all designed by William Butterfield. The church was constructed between 1853 and 1854. In 1910, a vestry was added, the sanctuary was panelled with oak in 1926, and an organ installed in 1939. The building was grade II listed in 1967.

The church is built of red brick with sandstone dressings and a steeply-pitched Welsh slate roof. It consists of a nave, north and south aisles, a north porch, a south boiler house, and a chancel with a north vestry. At the west end are three buttresses, the middle buttress carrying a corbelled brick and timber bell turret with a shingled spirelet and a wrought iron weathercock. Inside, there is an octagonal stone font and an octagonal wooden pulpit. The floors are laid with Minton tiles.

== See also ==
- Listed buildings in Pollington
