= Listed buildings in Hook, East Riding of Yorkshire =

Hook is a civil parish in the county of the East Riding of Yorkshire, England. It contains three listed buildings that are recorded in the National Heritage List for England. Of these, one is listed at Grade II*, the middle of the three grades, and the others are at Grade II, the lowest grade. The parish contains the village of Hook, to the northeast of the town of Goole, and the surrounding area. All the listed buildings are in the village, and consist of a church and two houses.

== Key ==
Grade	Criteria
II*	Particularly important buildings of more than special interest
II	Buildings of national importance and special interest

== Buildings ==
Name and location	Photograph	Date	Notes	Grade
St Mary's Church; 53.72042°N 0.85114°W		14th century	The church has been altered and extended through the centuries, including a heavy restoration in 1844. It is built in limestone and brick, with alterations in sandstone, and has a tile roof. The church consists of a nave, narrow north and south aisles, a south porch, and a lower chancel. Above the west front is a bellcote with twin openings.	II*
Hook Hall; 53.72674°N 0.85226°W		1743	The house is in brick, with floor bands, a parapet with stone coping], and a hipped pantile roof. There are thee storeys and five bays. The doorway has an architrave, a fanlight, and a pediment on carved consoles. The windows are 20th-century casements under flat brick arches.	II
Hook House; 53.72071°N 0.84981°W	—	Early 19th century	The house is in grey brick on a plinth, and has a hipped Welsh slate roof. There are two storeys, a square plan and three bays. Steps lead up to the central doorway that has a Tuscan doorcase and a fanlight. The windows are sashes under channelled wedge lintels with fluted keystones.	II
