= Pollington =

Village and civil parish in the East Riding of Yorkshire, England

Coordinates: 53.670590°N 1.073101°W

- Location within the East Riding of Yorkshire
- Population: 966 (2011 census)
- OS grid reference: SE613197
- Civil parish: Pollington
- Unitary authority: East Riding of Yorkshire
- Ceremonial county: East Riding of Yorkshire
- Region: Yorkshire and the Humber
- Country: England
- Sovereign state: United Kingdom
- Post town: GOOLE
- Postcode district: DN14
- Dialling code: 01405
- Police: Humberside
- Fire: Humberside
- Ambulance: Yorkshire
- UK Parliament: Goole and Pocklington

Pollington is a village and civil parish in the East Riding of Yorkshire, England. It is situated approximately 2 miles (3.2 km) south-west of the town of Snaith and 1 mile (1.6 km) south of the M62 motorway. It lies on the north bank of the Aire and Calder Navigation.

According to the 2011 UK census, Pollington parish had a population of 966, an increase on the 2001 UK census figure of 939.

== Amenities ==
Pollington has one pub, The King's Head. The second pub, The George and Dragon closed permanently.

The village has one primary school, Pollington-Balne Church of England Primary School.

There are two guest houses, Fir Tree Barn Guest House on Main Street directly adjacent to the Cricket Field and Parkside Guest House, next to the recreation area and Village Hall.

Recently Pollington has got an Ice Hockey team. The Pollington Nomads, a recreational hockey team formed of an amalgamation of players from rec teams from Sheffield, Peterborough, Nottingham and Leeds. NomadsIHC

== History ==
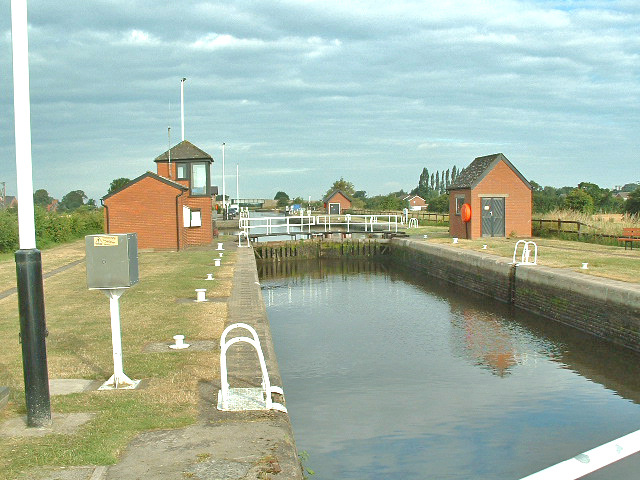
Lock on the Aire and Calder Navigation at Pollington

The name Pollington derives from the Old English Pofelingtūn meaning 'settlement at a place called Pofel'. The identity or origin of Pofel is unknown, but one theory is that it may be related to the Scots word poffle, meaning 'a small piece of land'.

In 1940 the Royal Air Force built an airfield called RAF Snaith north-west of Pollington. From it flew primarily these bombing units: 150 Squadron with Wellingtons from 1941 to 1942 and 51 Squadron with Halifaxes from 1942 to 1945. After 1946 it fell into disuse.

Pollington parish was part of the Goole Rural District in the West Riding of Yorkshire from 1894 to 1974, then in Boothferry district of Humberside until 1996.

The Anglican St John the Baptist's Church, Pollington is a designated Grade II listed building.

== Events ==
The first stage of the Tour de Yorkshire 2019 passed through Pollington on the first day of the event.

== Sports & Leisure ==
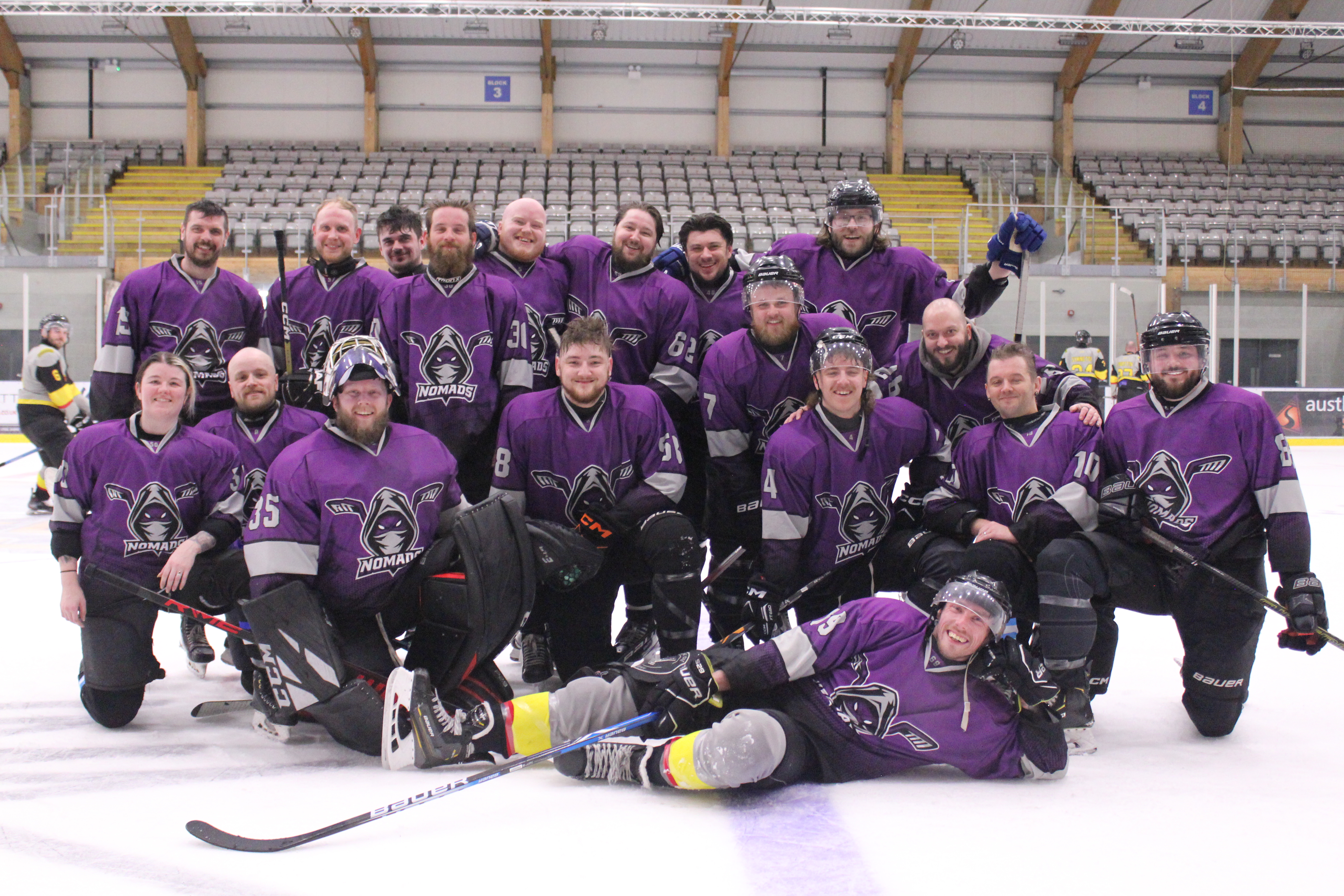
The Pollington Nomads debut team

While not having an ice rink in the village, Pollington recently gained an Ice Hockey team. The Pollington Nomads, a recreational hockey team formed of an amalgamation of players from rec teams across the U.K, currently including Sheffield, Peterborough, Nottingham and Leeds NomadsIHC

Debuting at Plant Ice Leeds on 30 March against the Leeds Warriors, Matthew "Grammar Police" Heaton took home the coveted Camel Award, Phooknose, Making him the first Nomad of the game.

== See also ==
- Listed buildings in Pollington
