= Listed buildings in Snaith and Cowick =

Snaith and Cowick is a civil parish in the county of the East Riding of Yorkshire, England. It contains 52 listed buildings that are recorded in the National Heritage List for England. Of these, two are listed at Grade I, the highest of the three grades, and the others are at Grade II, the lowest grade. The parish contains the market town of Snaith, the villages of East Cowick and West Cowick, and the surrounding countryside. Most of the listed buildings are houses, cottages and associated structures, shops, farmhouses and farm buildings. The others include two churches and a chapel, two schools, one still in use, former almshouses, public houses, tombs in a churchyard, former brewery buildings, and two mileposts.

== Key ==
Grade	Criteria
I	Buildings of exceptional interest, sometimes considered to be internationally important
II	Buildings of national importance and special interest

== Buildings ==
Name and location	Photograph	Date	Notes	Grade
Snaith Priory; 53.69206°N 1.03076°W		12th century	The church has been altered and extended through the centuries, including restorations in 1867–68. It is built in limestone and some sandstone, and has roofs of lead and Westmorland and Welsh slate. The church consists of a nave with a clerestory, north and south aisles, a south porch, north and south transepts, a chancel with north and south chapels and a north vestry, and a west tower embraced by the aisles. The tower has four stages, lighting slits, string courses, a pointed west doorway, lancet windows, a south clock face, triple lancet bell openings with hood moulds, a corbel table, and an embattled parapet with eight crocketed pinnacles. The walls of the body of the church are also embattled and have crocketed pinnacles.	I
Snaith Old Grammar School; 53.69248°N 1.03129°W		1626	The school, later used for other purposes, is in limestone with brick infilling and patching, partly rendered, with an extension in rendered brick and a tile roof. There is a rectangular plan, and it consists of a single room with an entrance on the east and an extension on the west. The windows are sashes, and on the west gable is a sandstone tablet with a worn inscription.	II
31 and 33 Beastfair; 53.69160°N 1.02628°W		1627	Originally almshouses, and later used for other purposes, the building is in brown brick, with a floor band, a modillion brick eaves cornice, and a swept pantile roof with an eaves course of slates, a brick coped gable on the right, and tumbled-in brick at the rear. There are two storeys, a double depth plan, and a front of three bays. On the front is a doorway, and to the right is a former shopfront consisting of a doorway in an architrave and a panelled reveal, and a tripartite sash window to the right under a cornice and a hood. The windows are horizontally sliding sashes, and on the upper floor is a datestone.	II
Cowick Hall; 53.68234°N 1.00707°W		1660–90	A country house, which has been altered and used for other purposes, it is in magnesian limestone and brick, partly rendered, with roofs in Westmorland and Welsh slate. There are two storeys, a rusticated basement and attics. The north front has nine bays with giant Ionic pilasters. In the centre is a perron leading to a tripartite Ionic porch with a pediment under a blind elliptical arch. The windows are sashes in architraves, those on the ground floor with balustraded aprons. Above is an eaves cornice on large acanthus brackets, and over the middle three bays is a pediment containing an achievement. Flanking this a balustraded parapet and a hipped roof containing four pedimented dormers. The south front has nine bays, Doric pilasters, and a central pedimented doorway.	I
1 and 3 Church Lane; 53.69173°N 1.03130°W		c. 1700	A pair of houses on a corner site, in red brick on a plinth, with corbelled eaves, and a pantile roof, hipped on the left. There are two storeys and four bays. On the front are two doorways with fanlights, and to the right is a canted bay window with an entablature and a modillion cornice. The windows are sashes in architraves.	II
Turnbridge Farmhouse; 53.68513°N 0.99013°W	—	c. 1700	The farmhouse is in red brick, with quoins, a corbelled brick eaves cornice, and a hipped pantile roof. There are two storeys and seven bays. The doorway has pilasters, a fanlight, a panelled frieze, a cornice and a hood. The windows are sashes in architraves, with flat rubbed brick arches. There is a blocked doorway and two blocked windows.	II
1 and 3 Market Place; 53.69161°N 1.02840°W		Late 17th to early 18th century	A house, later a shop, in rendered brick, with a moulded eaves cornice, and a pantile roof, hipped on the right. There are two storeys and four bays, the left bay later and angled. On the left is an angled shopfront with a central recessed doorway, columns, a frieze, carved consoles and a hood. To the right is a doorway with a frieze and a cornice, and further to the right is a shop window. The upper floor contains windows in architraves.	II
The Nook; 53.69150°N 1.03184°W		c. 1720–30	The house is in red brick, with some rendering, on a plinth with chamfered rustication, with sandstone dressings, quoins, a coped parapet, and a pantile roof. There are two storeys, a double depth plan, four bays, and a recessed bay on the left. Steps lead to a doorway with an architrave, a fanlight with geometrical glazing, and a moulded cornice and hood on consoles. The windows are casements with channelled wedge lintels and fluted keystones. The bay to the left contains a doorway with a segmental head and a sash window above. On the garden front is a large semicircular bow window and a round-headed stair window.	II
9 and 11 Church Lane; 53.69210°N 1.03143°W		1724	A house, later divided into two, in rendered brick on a plinth, with a floor band, a dentilled brick eaves cornice, and a pantile roof. There are two storeys and two bays. On the front are two doorways, the left with an architrave and a keystone. The ground floor windows are sashes with keystones. On the upper floor is a sash window on the left and a casement window on the right. Inside, there is an inglenook fireplace.	II
5 High Street; 53.69167°N 1.03070°W		Early 18th century	The house is in grey-brown brick, with a stone coped parapet and a swept pantile roof. There are two storeys and six bays. On the fourth bay, steps lead to a doorway with panelled pilasters, a dentiled pediment on scrolled consoles, and a plain fanlight in an architrave. The left bay contains a passage door with a fanlight, above which is a blind window, and the other windows are sashes in slightly recessed architraves. All the openings, apart from the main doorway, have painted rubbed-brick flat arches with projecting stone keystones.	II
13 High Street; 53.69160°N 1.03110°W		Early to mid-18th century	The house is in brick, whitewashed on the front, on a moulded plinth, with a floor band, rendered eaves courses, and a tile roof with a tile coped gable on the right. There are two storeys and an attic, and four bays. On the second bay is a doorway in an architrave under a segmental arch. To its left is a former shop double-bow window with panelled pilasters, a blocked central entrance, a bowed entablature and a hood. The right bay contains a garage door, and above the doorway is a blocked window. The other windows are sashes, the ground floor window with a segmental head.	II
10 and 12 Market Place; 53.69188°N 1.02889°W		Early to mid-18th century	A house and a shop in grey brick with red brick dressings, partly rendered, on a plinth, with quoins, a floor band, a dentilled wooden eaves cornice, and a pantile roof with stone coped gables and shaped kneelers. There are two storeys and an attic, and five bays. On the ground floor are two shopfronts with pilasters, shaped brackets and friezes, and to the right is a bow window with a frieze and a moulded cornice. The upper floor windows have flush architraves and red brick surrounds.	II
April Cottage; 53.69156°N 1.03127°W		Early to mid-18th century	The house is in colourwashed brick, and has a tile roof with a tile coped gable and a shaped stone kneeler on the right. There are two storeys and two bays. The doorway is on the right, the windows are sashes, those on the left bay horizontally sliding, and all the openings have segmental heads.	II
18 and 20 Beastfair; 53.69129°N 1.02727°W	—	Mid-18th century	A pair of houses in brick, the right house colourwashed, the left with a rendered front, on a plinth, the right with a pantile roof, the left with a tile roof, with stone coped gables and shaped kneelers. There are two storeys and attics, and each house has two bays. Both houses have a central doorway, the windows on the right house are sashes in architraves under flat brick arches, and those on the left house are 20th-century replacements.	II
33A Beastfair; 53.69167°N 1.02621°W	—	Mid-18th century	The house is in brown brick, with a dentilled brick eaves cornice and a pantile roof. There are two storeys and two bays. On the ground floor are a doorway under a segmental arch, and a tripartite sash window under an elliptical arch, and on the upper floor are two sash windows.	II
15 Church Lane; 53.69225°N 1.03149°W	—	Mid-18th century	The house is in red brick, with a floor band, a stepped and cogged eaves cornice, and a pantile roof with brick coped gables and shaped kneelers. There are two storeys, a double depth plan, and one bay. The doorway on the left is under a segmental arch, and the windows are modern. Inside the house is an inglenook fireplace.	II
3 High Street; 53.69169°N 1.03050°W		Mid-18th century	A vicarage, later a private house, in brown brick on a painted brick plinth, with corbeled brick eaves, and a double-span tile roof with stone coped gables and shaped kneelers. There are three storeys, a double depth plan, and four bays. On the third bay, steps with a cast iron balustrade lead to a doorway with a fanlight, and on the left bay is a passage doorway with a fanlight. The windows are sashes, and all the openings have painted rubbed-brick cambered arches.	II
7 and 9 High Street; 53.69164°N 1.03089°W		Mid-18th century	A pair of houses in orange-brown brick, with red brick dressings, quoins, and a Welsh slate roof. There are two storeys, a double depth plan and three bays. On the front are two doorways, the left with a plain surround and a timber lintel, and the right with a fanlight under a segmental red brick arch. Further to the right is a shop window with pilasters, a cornice and a hood. The other windows are sashes under flat brick arches.	II
5 and 7 Market Place; 53.69167°N 1.02868°W	—	Mid-18th century	A house, later a shop on the left and a house on the right. They are in brown brick, the house rendered, with a coved eaves cornice, and a tile roof with a stone coped gable and shaped kneelers on the left, and a kneeler on the right. There are two storeys and a double depth plan, the shop has three bays, and the house has two. The shop has a sill band, and steps lead up to a central doorway with a fanlight, a flat arch in rubbed brick, and a stone keystone. To its right is a canted bay window with a frieze and a dentilled cornice, above which is a blocked window. The other windows are sashes; they and the blocked window have painted flat arches and keystones. The house has a doorway approached by steps and inserted casement windows.	II
21 Market Place; 53.69172°N 1.02964°W		Mid-18th century	A house, later a shop, in colourwashed brick, rendered on the right return, on a plinth, with a dentilled and moulded wooden eaves cornice, and a slate roof with stone coped gables and shaped kneelers. There are two storeys and three bays. The ground floor contains a shop window on the left, and to its right is a blocked window. The other windows are sashes, and apart from the shop window, all the openings have channelled wedge lintels and fluted keystones.	II
22 Market Place; 53.69191°N 1.02952°W		Mid-18th century	The house is in yellow brick with red brick dressings, on a moulded plinth, with twin brick floor bands, a stepped and moulded brick eaves cornice and a pantile roof with raised brick coped gables. There are two storeys, a double depth plan, and three bays. The central doorway has a fanlight, the windows are sashes, and all the openings have flat brick arches and red brick surrounds.	II
The Downe Arms Inn; 53.69173°N 1.02924°W		Mid-18th century	The public house is in brown brick on a plinth, with a moulded cornice and a tile roof. There are three storeys, a double depth plan, and four bays. The doorway has an architrave and a rectangular fanlight. It is flanked by later bow windows with pilasters, and an entablature with a moulded cornice and half-domed lead roofs. The windows are sashes in architraves, and all the openings have channelled wedge lintels and keystones. On the returns are angle pilasters and floor bands.	II
East Lodge, Cowick Hall; 53.68674°N 1.00246°W		1752–60 (probable)	The former lodge consists of two octagonal turrets in rusticated limestone, with a later single-storey rendered range between them. The turrets have plinths, windows under lintels with keystones, corbelled eaves and octagonal roofs. The central range contains round-headed panels under a hipped roof, and at the rear is a doorway with sidelights in a semicircular opening.	II
Altar tomb (south); 53.69192°N 1.03049°W		1765	The altar tomb is in the churchyard of Snaith Priory to the south of the chancel. Adjacent to the altar tomb are three stone slabs with inscriptions and motifs, with dates of 1765, 1794 and 1797.	II
Altar tomb (southeast); 53.69193°N 1.03040°W		1765	The altar tomb is in the churchyard of Snaith Priory to the southeast of the chancel. Adjacent to the altar tomb are three stone slabs with inscriptions and dates of 1765, 1769, 1798 and 1800.	II
Red Garth; 53.68156°N 1.00070°W	—	Mid to late 18th century	The house is in brick, with a stepped and dentilled brick eaves cornice, and a pantile roof. There are two storeys and an attic, a double depth plan, and three bays. The doorway is in the centre and the windows are sashes. The ground floor openings have segmental stretcher arches, and the upper floor windows are under soldier arches. On the left gable is an attic window under a segmental arch.	II
The former Lodge; 53.69068°N 1.03120°W		Mid to late 18th century	A house, later a public house, in colourwashed brick, with stone dressings, a moulded stone coped parapet, and a pantile roof. There are three storeys, a double depth plan, and five bays. In the centre is a Doric entrance, with pilasters, an entablature, columns and a pediment, the doorway with a five-light fanlight and sash sidelights in architraves. Above the entrance is a Venetian window with a keystone, and the other windows are casements with flat arches and double keystones. On the returns are round-headed stair windows with keystones.	II
1 High Street; 53.69171°N 1.03034°W		Late 18th century	A house, later a house and a shop, in brown brick, with a plain wooden eaves board, and a tile roof with coped gables and shaped kneelers. There are two storeys and four bays. On the right is a shopfront with the house doorway on the left, with a plain frieze and a cornice and a hood on ornate scrolled consoles. On the left bay is a passage doorway, to its right and on the upper floor are sash windows in architraves; all these openings have painted rubbed-brick flat arches and keystones.	II
Mitton House; 53.69097°N 1.02581°W	—	Late 18th century	The house is in yellow brick, with overhanging eaves, and a swept Welsh slate roof, with a stone coped gable and shaped kneeler on the rear wing. There are two storeys and an attic, and a T-shaped plan, with a front range of three bays, and a rear wing. Steps lead to the central doorway that has a fanlight and a moulded pediment on scrolled consoles. To the right is a blocked basement window under a segmental arch, the other windows are tripartite sashes with rubbed brick flat arches, and on the left gable is a segmental-arched attic opening.	II
The Manor House; 53.69163°N 1.02813°W		c. 1800	A house, later a house and a shop, in grey brick on a stucco plinth, with a wooden eaves board, and a pantile roof. There are two storeys and three bays. The middle bay projects slightly, and contains a full-height round-headed recess. The contains two doorways approached by steps, with fanlights and painted flat brick arches, and above is an oculus under a painted brick arch. The left bay contains two shop windows, and on the right bay and upper floor are sash windows with painted flat arches.	II
9 and 9A Market Place; 53.69169°N 1.02897°W		Late 18th to early 19th century	A house, later used for other purposes, in brick on a plinth, with stepped eaves, and a pantile roof with stone coped gables and shaped kneelers. There are three storeys and three bays, and a rear wing on the left with two storeys and three bays. In the right bay is a segmental-arched carriage entrance, the middle bay contains a shopfront with a central doorway flanked by bow windows, with a bowed entablature and a moulded cornice, and on the left bay is a doorway in an architrave with a fanlight. The upper floors contain sash windows in architraves; they and the doorway have channelled wedge lintels and keystones.	II
11 Market Place; 53.69174°N 1.02921°W		Late 18th to early 19th century	A house, later two shops, in red brick on the front, brown brick on the sides and rear, and red brick to the rear wing. It is on a plinth, and has a dentiled brick eaves cornice and a slate roof. There are two storeys and an L-shaped double-depth plan, with a front range of four align="center" style="background-color: #ACE1AF"|II |-bays, and a later rear wing. On the ground floor are two shopfronts flanking a doorway in an architrave, with a fanlight and a dentilled cornice. The upper floor contains sash windows in architraves; they and the doorway have channelled wedge lintels and keystones.	II
Brewery, malt kiln and adjoining ranges 53.68551°N 1.02289°W		Late 18th to early 19th century	The former brewery buildings are in yellow or red brick, partly rendered, with Welsh slate roofs. There is a complex plan, and the buildings include a three-storey brewhouse, a malt kiln, stables, cart sheds, granaries and store rooms.	II
Lock-up; 53.69212°N 1.03025°W		Late 18th to early 19th century	The lock-up is in brown brick, with sandstone dressings and a pantile roof. There is a single storey and two bays. On the front are two doorways with stone jambs and lintels, and outside these are small windows with six vertical iron bars and a single cross-bar.	II
The Plough Inn; 53.69123°N 1.02806°W		Late 18th to early 19th century	A house, later a public house, in brick, with stepped eaves, and a pantile roof with stone coped gables. There are two storeys and four bays. The doorway and the windows, which are sashes in architraves, have painted brick cambered arches.	II
Wells House and rear range 53.68559°N 1.02261°W		Late 18th to early 19th century	The buildings are in brick with Welsh slate roofs. The house has a rendered plinth, stepped eaves, two storeys and an attic, a double depth plan, and three bays. The doorway has a fanlight and a corniced hood on decorative scrolled brackets. The windows are sashes in architraves with channelled stucco flat arches and fluted keystones. The rear range consists of a stable and storehouse, forming one side of the courtyard of the former brewery, and they have two low storeys and three bays.	II
Coach house and stable range, Cowick Hall; 53.68271°N 1.00480°W	—	1804	The coach house and stable range were designed by Joseph Bonomi. The coach house is in red brick, with dressings in sandstone and limestone, the stable wings are stuccoed, and they have a Welsh slate roof. The buildings consist of a coach house with two storeys and an attic and one bay, flanked by two-storey two-bay stable wings, and single-storey seven-bay projecting ranges. The coach house has a tripartite centre with pilasters, over which is a casement window and an open pediment containing acroteria and a clock face in the tympanum. There are pairs of carriage entrances, and casement windows.	II
3 Beastfair; 53.69141°N 1.02789°W		Early 19th century	The house is in brick, with a stepped and dentilled brick eaves cornice and a pantile roof. There are two storeys and three bays. The central doorway has a fanlight, above it is a blind window, and the other windows are sashes. All the openings are under rubbed-brick cambered arches.	II
Snaith Hall; 53.68995°N 1.03013°W		c. 1829	A small country house, later used for other purposes, in magnesian limestone, with a double-span hipped Westmorland slate roof, and an extension in stuccoed brick. There is a double depth plan and a basement, and the north front has a plinth, angle pilasters, a moulded string course, a moulded cornice, and three bays. The middle bay has three storeys and projects slightly under a pediment, and the outer bays have two storeys. In the centre is a projecting Doric porch, with columns and pilasters, an entablature with mutules, a moulded cornice and a hood. The doorway has a fanlight in an architrave and a keystone. The windows are sashes, on the ground floor with keystones, and on the upper floor with wedge lintels.	II
Bank Side Farmhouse; 53.66068°N 0.98951°W	—	Early to mid-19th century	The farmhouse is in red brick on a brick plinth, with a hipped Westmorland slate roof. There are two storeys, three bays, and a rear wing on the right. Steps lead to the central doorway that has a semicircular fanlight and a pediment. The windows are sashes with wedge lintels.	II
Eastfield House; 53.68999°N 1.02019°W	—	c. 1840	A house in grey brick on a plinth, with sandstone dressings, a sill band, a moulded wooden eaves board, bracketed eaves, and a double-span hipped Welsh slate roof. There are two storeys, a double depth plan, a front of three bays, and a rear wing on the right. In the centre is a Tuscan porch with attached columns, an entablature, a fanlight and a hood. The windows are sashes in wooden architraves with channelled wedge lintels and keystones.	II
Fairholme; 53.69034°N 1.02080°W	—	1848	The house is in red brick on a plinth, with stone dressings, and a Welsh slate roof with coped gables, kneelers and finials. There are two storeys and attics, and an L-shaped plan, with three bays at the front, a projecting gabled bay to the left, and a two-bay wing to the right. The right return has four bays, the left two bays gabled and containing a porch, and a two-bay rear wing on the right. The entrance has a chamfered four-centred arch and a hood mould, above which is an oriel window, a cornice, and a conical roof with a ball finial. Most of the windows are mullioned.	II
Beech Grove; 53.69126°N 1.02429°W	—	Mid-19th century	The house is in brick, rendered and incised to imitate stone, on a plinth, with stone dressings, a sill band, bracketed eaves, and a double-span hipped roof. There are two storeys, a double depth plan, and three bays. In the centre is a Tuscan porch with columns, an entablature and a hood, and a doorway with a fanlight in panelled reveals, and a moulded cornice. The windows are sashes with margin lights, channelled cambered wedge lintels, and raised fluted keystones.	II
The Goddards; 53.68934°N 1.01680°W	—	1853	The house is in red brick on a stucco plinth, with a stucco floor band, deep eaves with carved stone brackets, and a hipped Welsh slate roof. There are two storeys, a double depth plan and three bays. Steps lead to the central doorway in a recessed reveal, and it is flanked by French windows. On the upper floor are sash windows with flat arches. On the garden front is a canted bay window with French windows.	II
Holy Trinity Church, East Cowick; 53.68685°N 1.00003°W		1853–54	The church, designed by William Butterfield, is in red brick with sandstone dressings, and a Welsh slate roof. It consists of a nave, north and south aisles, a south porch, a chancel with a north vestry, and a west tower. The tower has buttresses, a string course, recessed two-light bell openings, and a short four-sided pyramidal spire with a wrought iron weathervane.	II
Cowick school and school house 53.68658°N 0.99951°W		1853–54	The school and school house were designed by William Butterfield, and are in red brick with a Welsh slate roof. The schoolroom has a single storey, to the right is the house, forming a gabled wing, with two storeys and an attic, and a wing in the rear angle. The schoolroom has two doorways and a large window forming a half-dormer with a hipped roof, and the house has a casement window on each floor.	II
The Old Vicarage; 53.68636°N 1.00111°W		1853–54	The former vicarage was designed by William Butterfield. It is in red brick with a Welsh slate roof, and has a rectangular plan. The south front has two storeys, three irregular bays, a full-height gabled wing to the left, and a projecting gabled wing on the right. The left wing has a square-headed stair window, on the right bay is a canted bay window, and the other windows are sashes. To the right is a coach house with a single storey and attic.	II
Methodist Chapel; 53.69162°N 1.02473°W		1862	The chapel is in red brick on a plinth, with sandstone dressings and a Welsh slate roof. There are two storeys, five bays on the front, and six along the sides. On the front is a Roman Ionic hexastyle portico, with pedestals carrying half-columns in the centre and pilasters on the side bays, with festooned capitals. Each of the three middle bays contains a round-arched doorway with a semicircular fanlight, an archivolt, a moulded impost string course, and a bracketed keystone. The outer bays contain sash windows with cambered brick arches and fluted keystones, and on the upper floor are round-arched sash windows with recessed panelled aprons. Above is a modillion pediment with relief carvings and a date plaque in the tympanum.	II
Milepost near Fairholme; 53.69023°N 1.02204°W		Mid to late 19th century	The milepost on the south side of the A1041 road is in cast iron. It has a triangular section, a triangular head, and is about 1 metre (3 ft 3 in) in height. On the sides facing the road are panels with raised borders, and the distances in miles to Selby and Thorne.	II
Milepost near Cowick School; 53.68613°N 0.99915°W		Mid to late 19th century	The milepost on the south side of the Snaith Road (A1041 road) is in cast iron. It has a triangular section, a triangular head, and is about 1.1 metres (3 ft 7 in) in height. On the sides facing the road are panels with raised borders, and the distances in miles to Selby and Thorne.	II
Dower House, Cowick Hall; 53.68290°N 1.00567°W	—	c. 1870	The house, later used for other purposes, is in red brick, with sandstone dressings, quoins, a dentilled brick eaves course, a moulded stone cornice, and a hipped Welsh slate roof. There are two storeys, three bays, and a rear wing on the left. The doorway has an architrave, a fanlight, and a cornice and hood on scrolled brackets. The windows on the front are sashes in architraves, with moulded cornices, and on the right return is a round-headed sash window with a keystone.	II
Crown Brewery warehouse and brewery range 53.68553°N 1.02313°W		1892	The former brewery buildings are in red brick on a black brick plinth, with slate-cadding, weatherboarding, nd a Welsh slate roof. The main range has three storeys and a basement, and four bays , a single-stoprey single-bay section to the left, and a single-storey two-baysection to the right. It contains doorways and basement windows under cambered arches, abve are casement windows under swegmetnal arches with keystones, moulded brick string courses, and a corbeled brick eaves cornice. The roof is hipped on which is a louvred section with gablets, and ornate finials.	II
