= Boothferry Borough Council elections =

Local government elections in Humberside, England

Boothferry was a non-metropolitan district in Humberside, England. It was abolished on 1 April 1996 and replaced by East Riding of Yorkshire and North Lincolnshire.

== Political control ==
The first election to the council was held in 1973, initially operating as a shadow authority before coming into its powers on 1 April 1974. Political control of the council from 1974 until its abolition in 1996 was as follows:

Party in control	Years
Independent	1974–1979
Conservative	1979–1987
No overall control	1987–1996

== Council elections ==
- 1973 Boothferry District Council election
- 1976 Boothferry District Council election (New ward boundaries)
- 1979 Boothferry Borough Council election
- 1983 Boothferry Borough Council election
- 1987 Boothferry Borough Council election (Borough boundary changes took place but the number of seats remained the same)
- 1991 Boothferry Borough Council election

1994 - (Borough boundary changes took place but the number of seats remained the same)
