= Mark Gregory (garden designer) =

English garden designer

Mark Gregory is a garden designer from West Cowick, Yorkshire. He has been in the horticultural and landscaping industry for about 35 years. Gregory was voted the most influential person in the landscape and garden design industry. He completed his training in horticulture with the RHS at Wisley and also Askham Bryan Horticultural College. He is a fellow of the Landscape Institute and is now a chartered landscape architect (FI.)

Gregory has been involved with 99 gardens at the Chelsea Flower Show, with a total a 160 show gardens for the RHS, making him the most medalled garden builder within the RHS. He has achieved gold medals at the Chelsea Flower Show on five occasions and is a senior RHS Garden Assessor and Garden Judge.
