= Steve Foots =

British businessman

- Born: Stephen Edward Foots; September 1968 (age 57)
- Education: University of York
- Occupation: Businessman
- Years active: 1989–present
- Title: CEO, Croda International
- Term: 2012–present
- Predecessor: Mike Humphrey
- Successor: Incumbent
- Spouse: married
- Children: 2

Stephen Edward Foots CBE (born September 1968) is a British businessman. He is the chief executive (CEO) of Croda International, a FTSE 100 British specialist chemicals company.

== Early life ==
Foots was born in September 1968, and raised in the north-east of England. His father’s one-time best friend was football manager Brian Clough. He has a BSc in chemistry from the University of York.

== Career ==
Foots has been chief executive (CEO) of Croda International since 1 January 2012. He has worked for Croda for 21 years, starting as a graduate trainee, and joined the board in July 2010.

In 2014, his total annual remuneration passed £1.4 million.

== Personal life ==
Foots is married with children. He is a keen Sunderland A.F.C. supporter.
