= St Mary's Church, Hook =

Church in Hook, East Riding of Yorkshire, England

Coordinates: 53°43′13″N 0°51′04″W

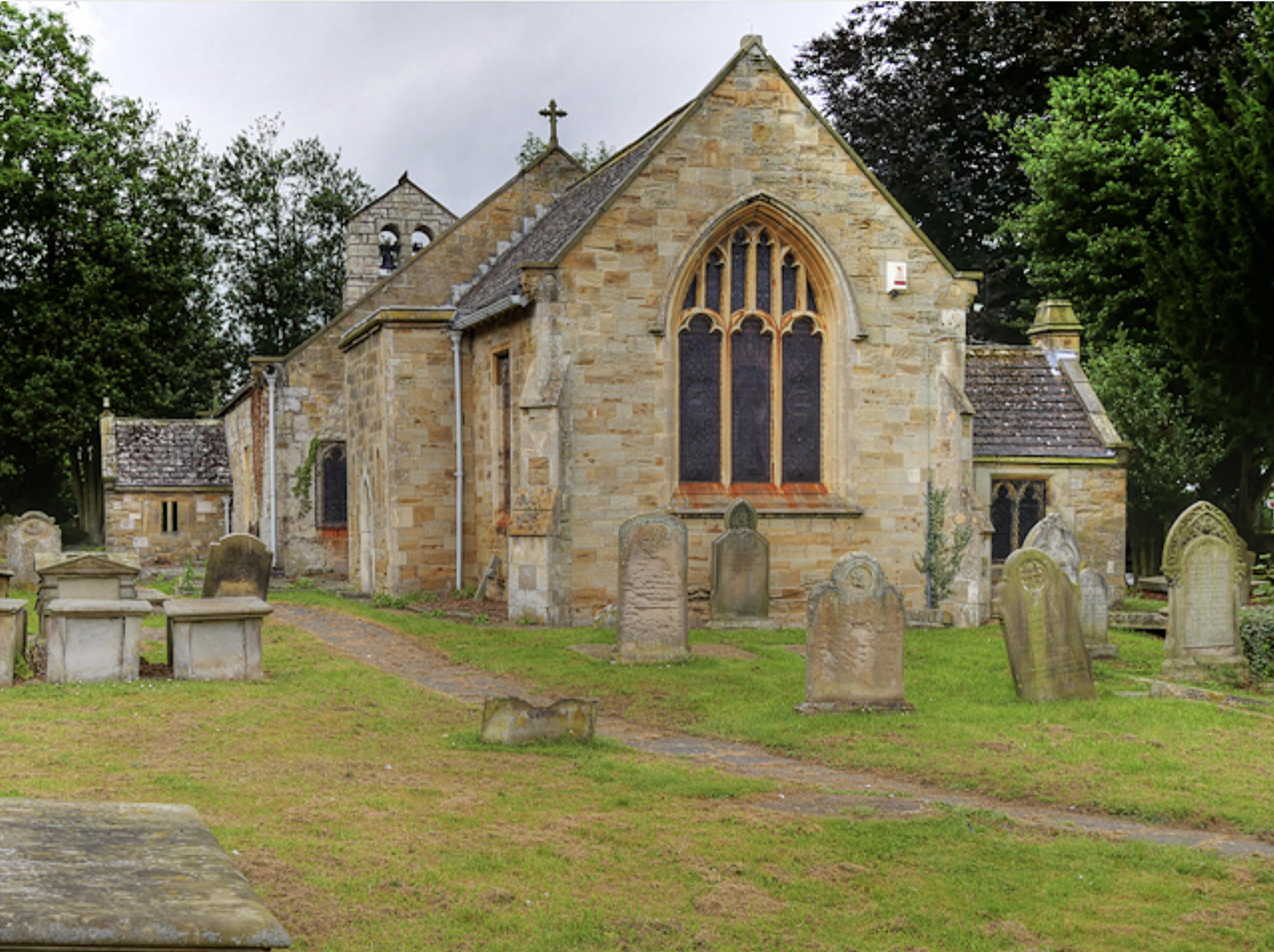
The church, in 2017

St Mary's Church is the parish church of Hook, East Riding of Yorkshire, a village in England.

A church in Hook was first recorded in 1225, but the current building dates from the 14th and 15th centuries. In 1844, the building was heavily restored by William Hurst and William Lambie Moffatt. It was again altered in 1873 and around 1896. The building was grade II* listed in 1967. In 2025, the church held a weekend of events to mark its 800th anniversary and raise funds for restoration.

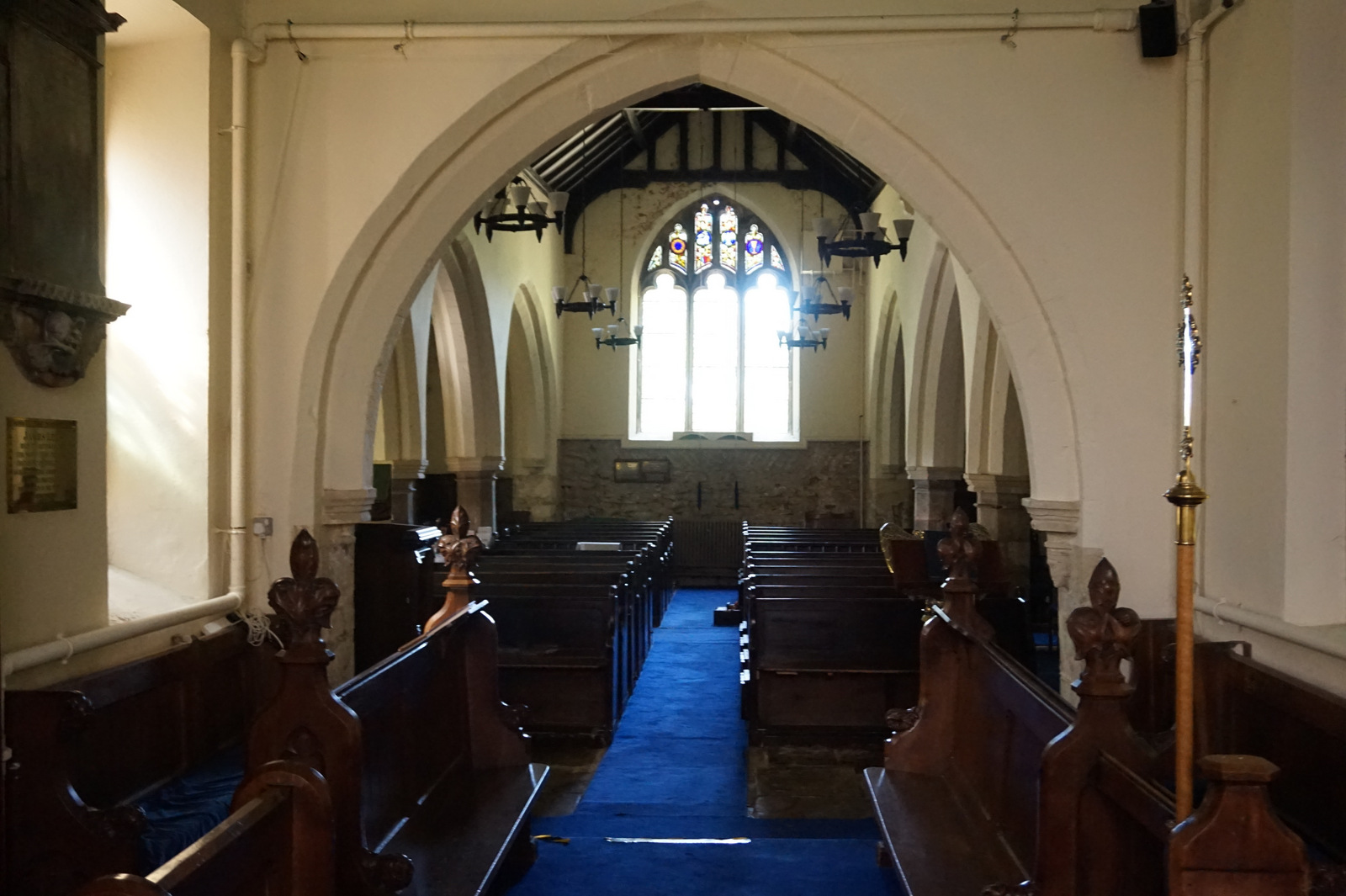
Interior of the church in 2019

The church is built of limestone and brick, with alterations in sandstone, and has a tile roof. The church consists of a nave, narrow north and south aisles, a south porch, and a lower chancel. Above the west front is a bellcote with twin openings. One window has stained glass designed in 1901 by William Pape, depicting Victoria of the United Kingdom in a wheelchair.

== See also ==
- Grade II* listed buildings in the East Riding of Yorkshire
- Listed buildings in Hook, East Riding of Yorkshire
