= Listed buildings in Pollington =

Pollington is a civil parish in the county of the East Riding of Yorkshire, England. It contains five listed buildings that are recorded in the National Heritage List for England. All the listed buildings are designated at Grade II, the lowest of the three grades, which is applied to "buildings of national importance and special interest". The parish contains the village of Pollington and the surrounding countryside, and the listed buildings consist of a church, its vicarage, a school, and two farmhouses.

== Buildings ==
| Name and location | Photograph | Date | Notes |
|---|---|---|---|
| Dovehouse Farmhouse; 53.67082°N 1.07708°W | — | c. 1700 | The house is in red brick, with a cogged brick eaves cornice, and a pantile roof with brick coped gables. There are two storeys and an L-shaped plan, with a front range of four bays, and a rear wing. The doorway has a cambered arch, and the windows are casements, most under segmental arches. Inside, there is an inglenook fireplace. |
| Pollington Hall; 53.67124°N 1.07978°W | | Mid-18th century | The farmhouse is in brown brick on a plinth, with a stepped and dentilled brick eaves cornice and a slate roof with stone coped gables and shaped kneelers. There are three storeys, a double depth plan, and five bays. Steps flanked by stone walls lead up to the central doorway that has an architrave, a Gothic fanlight in a beaded surround, and a moulded pediment on scrolled consoles. The windows on the lower two floors are sashes in architraves with painted rubbed brick flat arches, and on the top floor are 20th-century pivoted casement windows. |
| St John the Baptist's Church; 53.66585°N 1.07663°W | | 1843–44 | The church was designed by William Butterfield, and the vestry was added in 1910. The church is built in red brick with sandstone dressings and a steeply-pitched Welsh slate roof. It consists of a nave, north and south aisles, a north porch, a south boiler house, and a chancel with a north vestry. At the west end are three buttresses, the middle buttress carrying a corbelled brick and timber bell turret with a shingled spirelet and a wrought iron weathercock. |
| The Vicarage; 53.66585°N 1.07663°W | | 1843–44 | The vicarage, designed by William Butterfield, is in red brick, partly rendered, with a steeply-pitched double-span tile roof. There are two storeys, a double-depth plan, and a south front of three bays. The west front has twin single-bay gabled ranges, the right recessed, and containing a doorway with a three-light fanlight in a chamfered reveal under a brick soldier arch. Some windows are mullioned and others are sashes. At the rear is an outshut, and a walled courtyard with a coach house at the north. |
| Primary school 53.66612°N 1.07609°W | — | 1854–55 | The school and school house were designed by William Butterfield, and have since been extended. They are in red brick with a roof of tile and Welsh slate. The original part consists of a single-storey three-bay schoolroom, and a house with a single storey and attics and three bays to the left. The schoolroom has a segmental-headed entrance and varied windows. The house has a cross-mullion window under pointed arches, and a two-light sash window. |
