= Hook, East Riding of Yorkshire =

Village and civil parish in the East Riding of Yorkshire, England

Coordinates: 53°43′16″N 0°50′52″W

Hook
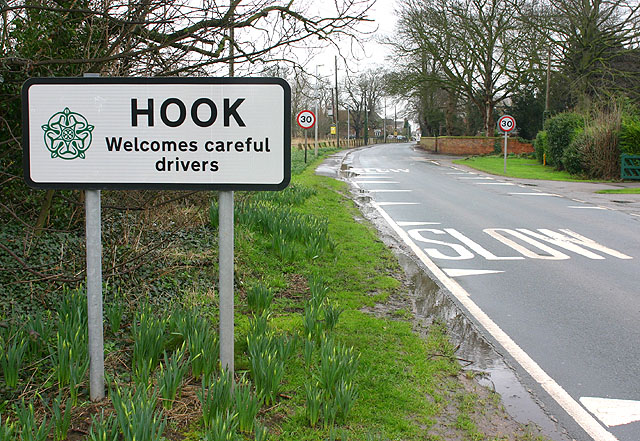
- Church Lane

- Location within the East Riding of Yorkshire
- Population: 1,292 (2011 census)
- OS grid reference: SE761255
  - London: 155 mi (249 km) S
- Civil parish: Hook
- Unitary authority: East Riding of Yorkshire
- Ceremonial county: East Riding of Yorkshire
- Region: Yorkshire and the Humber
- Country: England
- Sovereign state: United Kingdom
- Post town: GOOLE
- Postcode district: DN14
- Dialling code: 01405
- Police: Humberside
- Fire: Humberside
- Ambulance: Yorkshire
- UK Parliament: Goole and Pocklington

Hook is a village and civil parish in the East Riding of Yorkshire, England. It is situated approximately 1.5 miles (2.4 km) north-east of Goole town centre and lies on the west bank of the River Ouse.

According to the 2011 UK census, Hook parish had a population of 1,292, an increase on the 2001 UK census figure of 1,141.

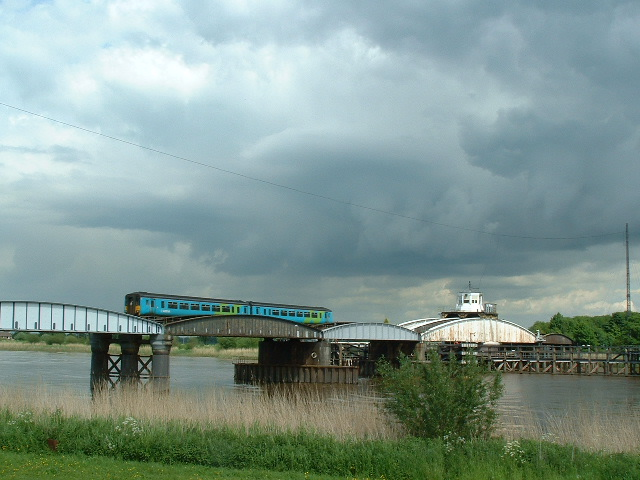
Grade II* listed swing railway bridge at Hook

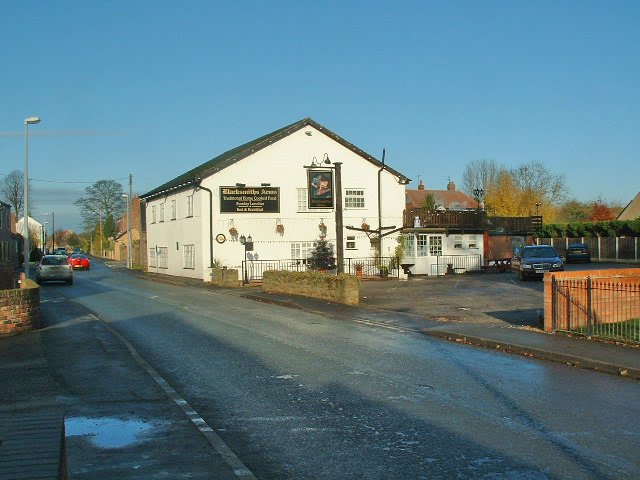
Blacksmith's Arms public house, Hook

The parish was part of the Goole Rural District in the West Riding of Yorkshire from 1894 to 1974, then in the Boothferry district of Humberside until 1996.

The name Hook derives from the Old English hūc, referring to a hook shaped river bend.

St Mary's Church, Hook was designated a Grade II* listed building in 1967 and is now recorded in the National Heritage List for England, maintained by Historic England.

The village has a nearby local school: Hook Church Of England Primary School. There is also a small local post office and two public houses. The village has a number of building sites for the purpose of housing development.

Nearby, Goole has facilities, including shops, schools, a hospital, and a railway station with services to Hull, Doncaster, and Leeds.

== See also ==
- Listed buildings in Hook, East Riding of Yorkshire
