= The Snaith School =

Coordinates: 53°41′24.3″N 1°02′10.8″W

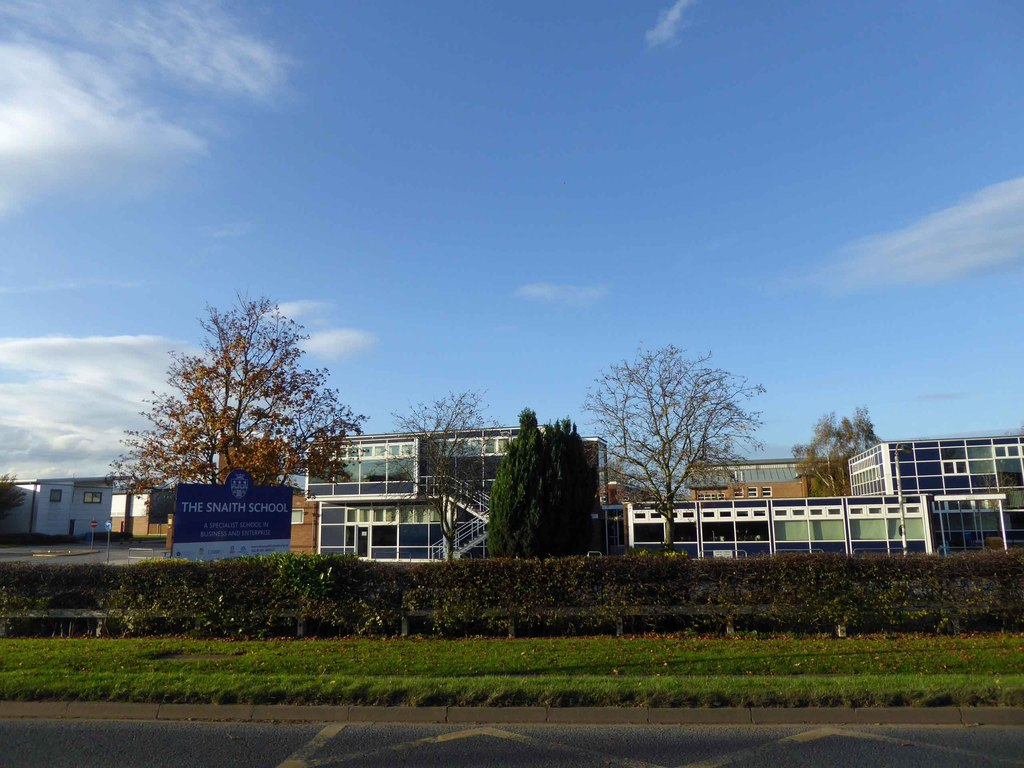

Location
- Pontefract Road; Snaith, East Riding of Yorkshire, DN14 9LB; England

Information
- Type: Academy
- Established: 1899
- Trust: The Education Alliance
- Department for Education URN: 140866 Tables
- Ofsted: Reports
- Headteacher: Heather Yates
- Gender: Coeducational
- Age: 11 to 16
- Enrolment: 910
- Capacity: 954
- Website: https://www.thesnaithschool.org.uk/

The Snaith School is a coeducational secondary school with academy status, located in Snaith in the East Riding of Yorkshire, England. The school was founded in 1899. As of 2014 the school had a pupil count of 910. Also as of the 2014 ofsted report the school was rated: Good. the Percentage of pupils who attained five GCSEs grade A* to C including English and mathematics in 2014 was 66%.
