= Goole Rural District =

Former local government area in the UK

Coordinates: 53.677°N 0.903°W

Goole was a rural district in the West Riding of Yorkshire, England from 1894 to 1974.

It was created under the Local Government Act 1894, based on most of the Goole rural sanitary district (two parishes of which in Lincolnshire became part of the Isle of Axholme Rural District). The town of Goole itself formed a separate urban district. The district contained the following parishes:

- Adlingfleet
- Airmyn
- Eastoft
- Fockerby
- Goole Fields
- Gowdall
- Haldenby
- Hook
- Ousefleet
- Pollington
- Rawcliffe
- Reedness
- Snaith and Cowick
- Swinefleet
- Whitgift

In 1974, under the Local Government Act 1972, the district became part of the Boothferry district of Humberside. Since 1996 it has been divided between the East Riding of Yorkshire and North Lincolnshire unitary authorities.
