= Boothferry (district) =

Former local government district in England

Coordinates: 53.70°N 0.88°W

- Boothferry shown within Humberside
- Area
  - 1974: 159,257 acres (644.49 km^{2})
- Population
  - 1973: 55,240
  - 1992: 64,800
- History
  - Created: 1974
  - Abolished: 1996
  - Succeeded by: East Riding of Yorkshire, North Lincolnshire
- Status: Borough
  - HQ: Goole

Boothferry was, from 1 April 1974 to 1 April 1996, a local government district within the non-metropolitan county of Humberside. The district is now split between the East Riding of Yorkshire and North Lincolnshire.

The district was formed from parts of three administrative counties: from the West Riding of Yorkshire came the former borough of Goole and Goole Rural District, from the East Riding of Yorkshire came Howden Rural District and from Lincolnshire, Parts of Lindsey came Isle of Axholme Rural District. On 28 April 1978 the district was granted borough status, becoming the Borough of Boothferry.

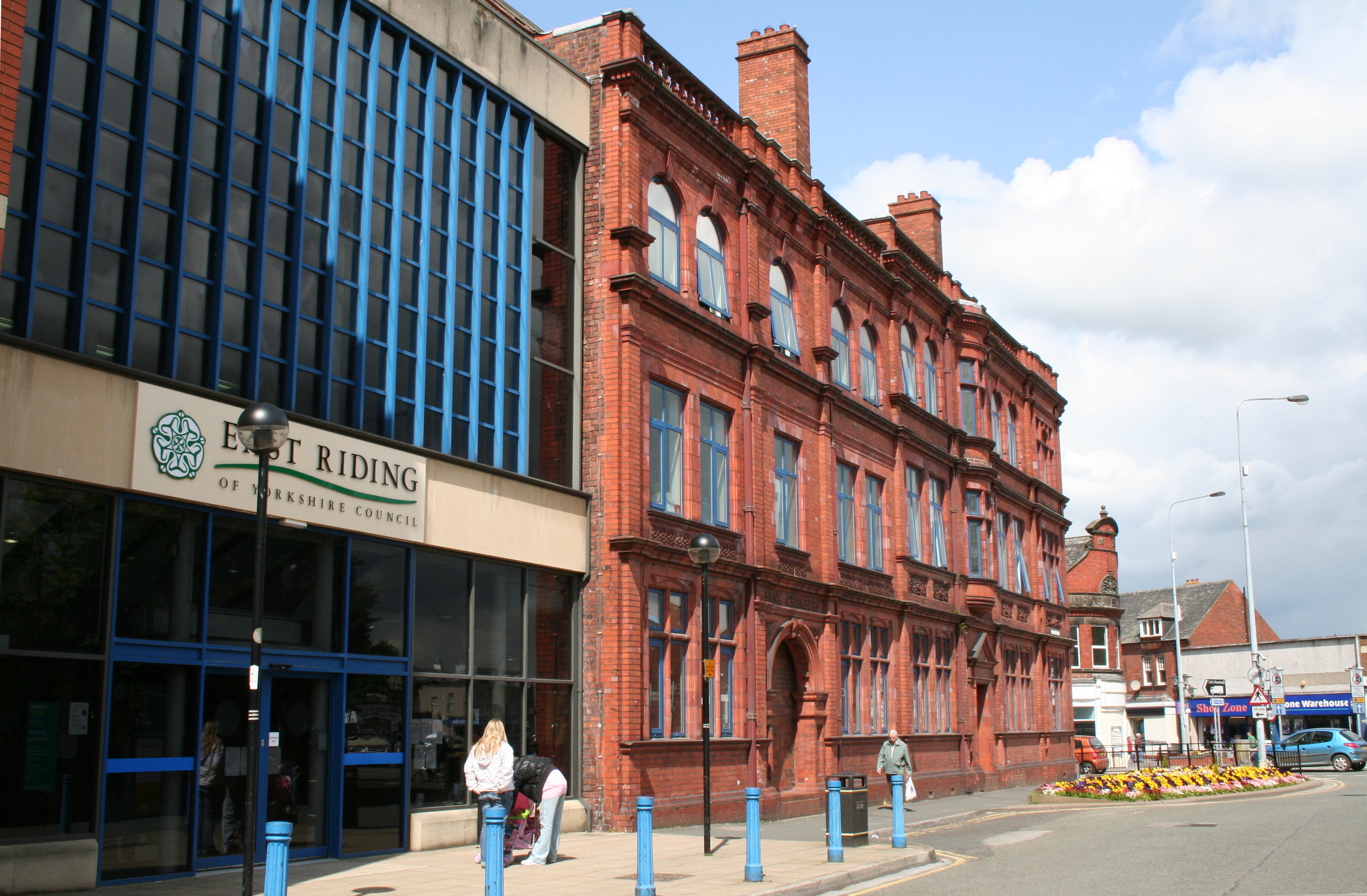
Council's headquarters, Goole

The district was named after the village of Boothferry, site of a bridge over the River Ouse, near the centre of the borough.

Alternative names considered by the merging councils were 'Five Districts, 'West Humberside' and 'Vermuyden'.

The council established its headquarters at Bank Chambers in the centre of Goole.

== Parishes ==
At abolition, the district consisted of the following civil parishes:

- Airmyn
- Amcotts
- Asselby
- Barmby on the Marsh
- Belton
- Blacktoft
- Broomfleet
- Bubwith
- Crowle
- Eastoft
- Eastrington
- Ellerton
- Epworth
- Foggathorpe
- Garthorpe and Fockerby
- Gilberdyke
- Goole
- Goole Fields
- Gowdall
- Haxey
- Holme-upon-Spalding Moor
- Hook
- Hotham
- Howden
- Keadby with Althorpe
- Kilpin
- Laxton
- Luddington and Haldenby
- Newport
- North Cave
- Owston Ferry
- Pollington
- Rawcliffe
- Reedness
- Snaith and Cowick
- Spaldington
- Swinefleet
- Twin Rivers
- West Butterwick
- Wressle
- Wroot

== See also ==
- Boothferry Borough Council elections
