= East Cowick =

Village in the East Riding of Yorkshire, England

Coordinates: 53.684669°N 0.996402°W

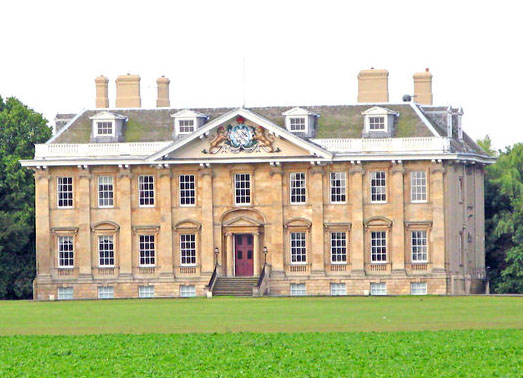
- Cowick Hall

- Location within the East Riding of Yorkshire
- OS grid reference: SE663213
  - London: 155 mi (249 km) S
- Civil parish: Snaith and Cowick
- Unitary authority: East Riding of Yorkshire
- Ceremonial county: East Riding of Yorkshire
- Region: Yorkshire and the Humber
- Country: England
- Sovereign state: United Kingdom
- Post town: GOOLE
- Postcode district: DN14
- Dialling code: 01405
- Police: Humberside
- Fire: Humberside
- Ambulance: Yorkshire
- UK Parliament: Goole and Pocklington

East Cowick is a village in the East Riding of Yorkshire, England, situated approximately 1.5 miles (2.4 km) east of Snaith. It lies on the A1041 road and just north of the M62 motorway. It was historically part of the West Riding of Yorkshire until 1974.

It forms part of the civil parish of Snaith and Cowick.

== Buildings ==
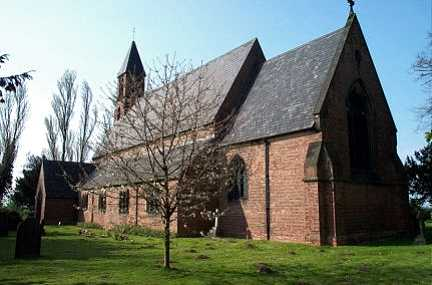
Holy Trinity Church

The parish church of Holy Trinity was built by Charles Ward of Lincoln between 1853 and 1854, to a design by William Butterfield. The work was commissioned by the William Dawnay, 7th Viscount Downe, and the west end is thought to be modelled on the church at Lindisfarne (Holy Island) in Northumberland. It is now a Grade II listed building. Dawnay's commission also included the vicarage and the Church of England primary school, together with its schoolhouse, all of which are Grade II listed. Similar clusters of buildings were erected at Hensall and Pollington.

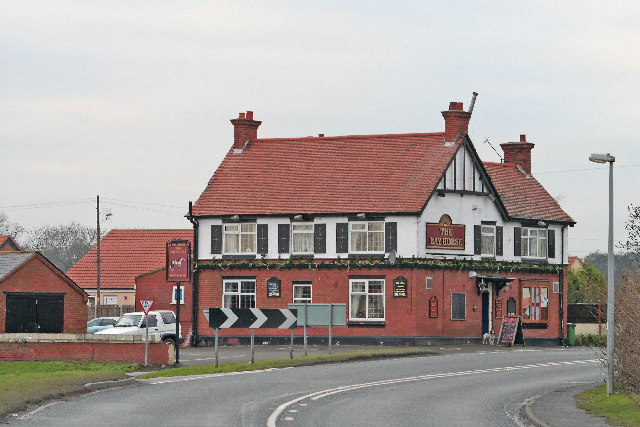
The Bay Horse Public House

To the west of the village is the late 17th-century Grade I-listed Cowick Hall, the former seat of the Viscounts Downe which is now the headquarters of Croda International. It was built between 1660 and 1690 for Sir John Dawnay, the first Viscount and James Paine altered it for the third Viscount between 1752 and 1760. The fifth Viscount made two further sets of changes in the 1790s and between 1804 and 1811, and the last major alterations were between 1869 and 1880 for Henry and Benjamin Shaw. Recent changes have been more minor. Nikolaus Pevsner, who catalogued the buildings of England, believed that the main fronts of Cowick Hall were among the most accomplished 17th-century country house designs in the land.

== River Don ==
At the eastern border of the village, a three-arched bridge carries the A1041 road over a small stream. In 1628, the drainage engineer Cornelius Vermuyden diverted the River Don northwards, to join the River Aire. The work was part of the drainage of Hatfield Chase, and the river skirted the eastern edge of the village, to join the Aire at Turnbridge. A "Great Sluice" was constructed where the rivers joined, which included a navigable lock. Following flooding of the villages bordering the new route, a 5-mile (8 km) channel was constructed from Newbridge near Thorne eastwards to Goole, where water levels in the River Ouse were between 5 and 10 feet (1.5 and 3.0 m) lower than at Turnbridge. The channel was called the Dutch River, and was not intended to be navigable, so boats continued to use the lock at Turnbridge, until the sluice at Goole was swept away by floods in 1688. Boats started to use the Dutch River, and the channel through East Cowick gradually silted up. The bridge is now Grade II listed, and the parish boundary follows the course of the Don from the road to the Aire.

== See also ==
- Listed buildings in Snaith and Cowick
