= Rawcliffe Bridge =

Hamlet in the East Riding of Yorkshire, England

Coordinates: 53.682934°N 0.941103°W

- Location within the East Riding of Yorkshire
- OS grid reference: SE700212
- Civil parish: Rawcliffe
- Unitary authority: East Riding of Yorkshire
- Ceremonial county: East Riding of Yorkshire
- Region: Yorkshire and the Humber
- Country: England
- Sovereign state: United Kingdom
- Post town: GOOLE
- Postcode district: DN14
- Dialling code: 01405
- Police: Humberside
- Fire: Humberside
- Ambulance: Yorkshire
- UK Parliament: Goole and Pocklington

Rawcliffe Bridge is a small hamlet in the East Riding of Yorkshire, England. It is situated approximately 3 miles (4.8 km) south-west of Goole and lies just south of the M62 motorway.

It forms part of the civil parish of Rawcliffe which lies just to the north-west. The hamlet was once served by a station on the Selby to Goole branch line, but this closed along with the line in June 1964.

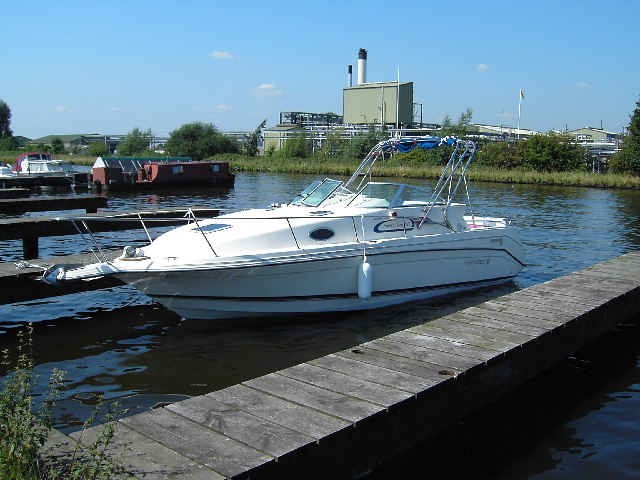
Marina at Rawcliffe Bridge

The Aire and Calder Navigation runs just south of Rawcliffe Bridge. Sugar Mill Ponds lies just to the west and is designated as a Local Nature Reserve and was part funded by lottery money.

Rawcliffe Bridge is home to an ex-RAF hardened communications UNITER bunker which is now owned by a security company, next to this site also is a MoD GPSS fuel depot.
