= Cowick Hall =

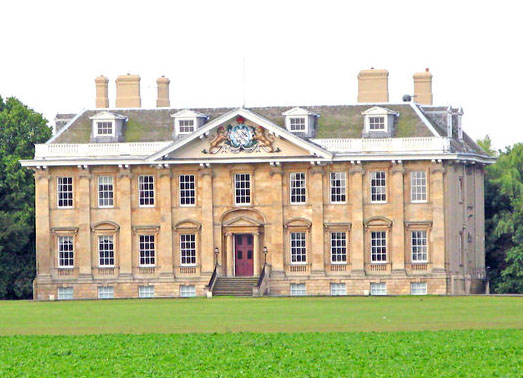

- Location within East Riding of Yorkshire

General information
- Type: Country house
- Architectural style: Georgian
- Location: Snaith, East Riding of Yorkshire
- Coordinates: 53.683046°N 1.007073°W
- Current tenants: Croda International
- Completed: c. 1660-90
- Renovated: 1752–1760
- Client: John Dawnay, 1st Viscount Downe

Renovating team
- Architect: James Paine

Listed Building – Grade I
- Designated: 23 April 1952
- Reference no.: 1083323

Cowick Hall is a 17th-century Georgian country house in the town of Snaith, located between the villages of East and West Cowick, in the East Riding of Yorkshire, England. The house is Grade I listed and several outbuildings on the estate are Grade II listed. Once home to the Viscounts Downe, today it serves as the corporate headquarters of chemical company Croda International.

== History ==
In the 14th century, the Cowick lands came into the hands of the Dawnay family, whose chief seats came to be Cowick Hall, Dawnay Lodge and Danby Castle. The Dawnays descended from the lords of the manor at Shannock (or Shunock) in Sheviock, Cornwall. During the reign of Richard II, Thomas Dawnay, younger brother of Sir John Dawnay, married Elizabeth, the daughter and heiress of John Newton of Snaith, Yorkshire. Thomas Dawnay settled in the Yorkshire parish of Escrick. His grandson Sir John Dawnay was the first of several Dawnays to serve as High Sheriff of Yorkshire.

Cowick Hall was built in the late 17th century for John Dawnay, 1st Viscount Downe. The original architect is unknown, but the main house was significantly altered from 1752 to 1760 by James Paine for the third Viscount, including internal remodelling, rebuilding the south entrance and resetting the roof balustrade. Italian architect Joseph Bonomi designed additional alterations in the 1790s for the fifth Viscount, including redesigning the west staircase and an addition of the external south gallery. Bonodi returned for more work between 1804 and 1811, when he also designed the two-storey U-shaped coachhouse and stables.

In 1869, the ninth viscount sold the estate for unknown reasons to Henry Shaw, a cotton spinner and also a fruit and vegetable exporter from Cleckheaton. The records from the sale described it thus:

The Hall is situated in the midst of a noble park of about 330 acres in extent... and is approached through a long avenue of stately forest trees... The outbuildings consist of superior stabling for twenty horses... two saddle rooms, two large carriage houses, four grooms rooms... bakehouse and brewhouse... The fruit and vegetable gardens are extensive and productive, and enclosed by high brick walls, flued throughout and partially covered by fruit trees.

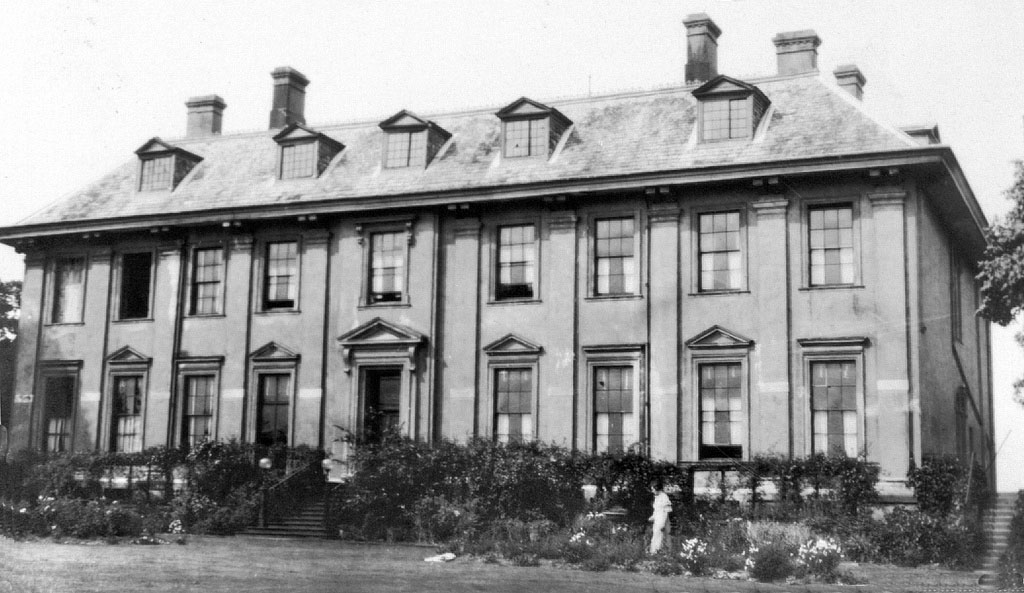
South side of Cowick Hall, c. 1900

To that Shaw added a two-storey, red-brick dower house in 1870. Shaw died suddenly in 1871, leaving the house to his brother Benjamin, who lived at Cowick Hall until 1889. Benjamin Shaw remodelled the interior of the main house, and during this process "destroyed much of the splendour of the house," according to the Bishop of Sheffield David Lunn, who wrote a history of the surrounding area.

Despite the unfortunate changes to the interior, Nikolaus Pevsner wrote that the main fronts of Cowick Hall were among the most accomplished 17th-century country house designs in England. Pevsner noted the decorated "cornice supported on pairs of large acanthus brackets above each pilaster," with the giant carved and painted achievement of the Dawnay family with their motto TIMET PUDOREM ("he fears shame") above the door.

In 1889, Samuel Joseph Cooper, an industrialist from Barnsley, purchased the home. He died in 1913 and thereafter Cowick Hall fell into neglect. It changed hands several times and at one point pigs lived in the cellars of the main house. In 1954, plans to demolish Cowick Hall took root.

The house was rescued, however, in 1955, when it became the headquarters for local chemical company Croda International, which still occupies the house today.

== Listed buildings ==
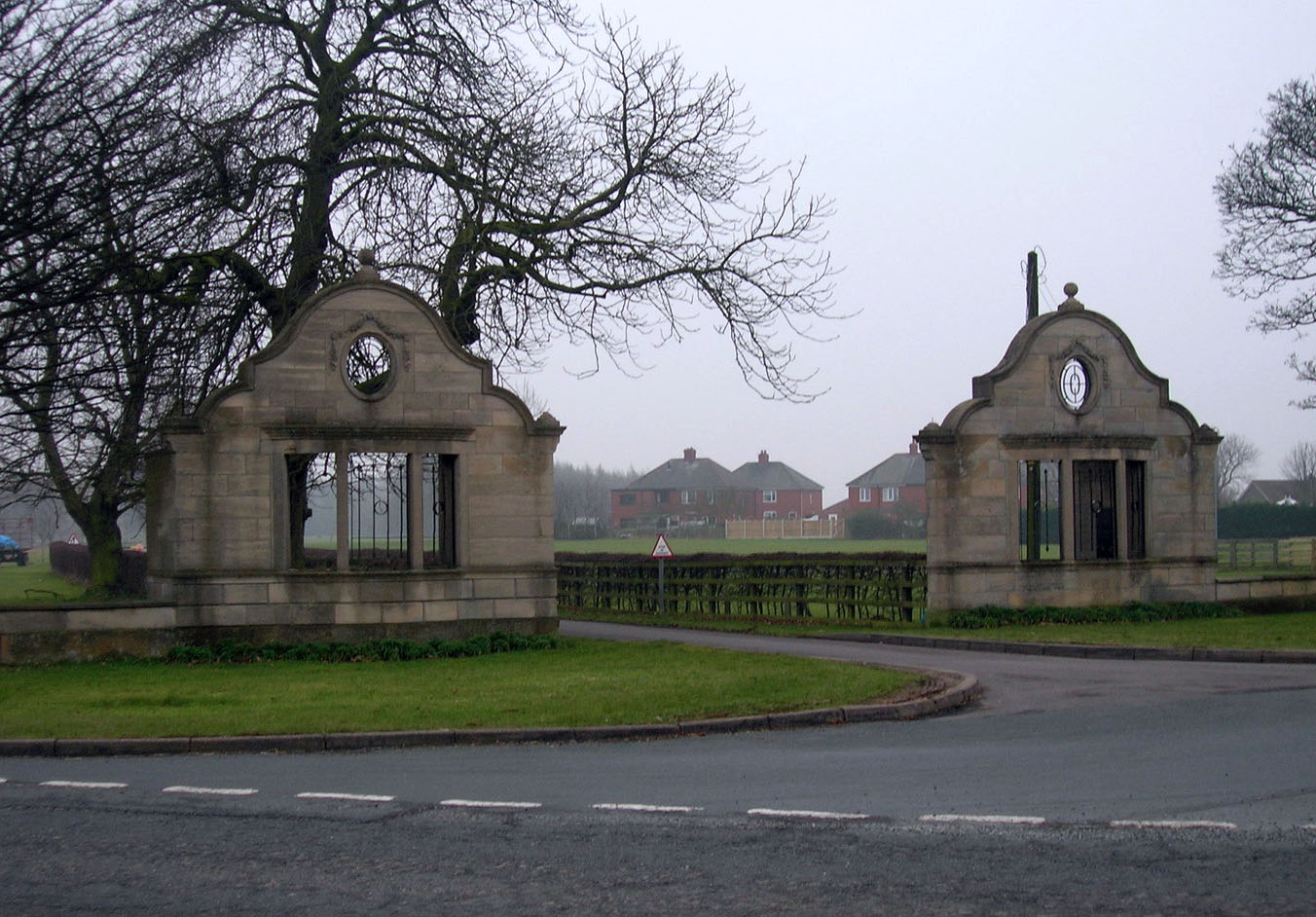
The Grade II-listed gate lodge at Cowick Hall

Cowick Hall is Grade I-listed with Historic England, and three other buildings on the estate are Grade II-listed:

- The Bonomi-designed coachhouse and stable block, which lies approximately 150 metres (490 ft) east of the main house;
- the dower house, approximately 100 metres (330 ft) northeast of Cowick Hall; and
- the gate lodge, most likely designed by Paine during his work in the mid-18th century.

== See also ==
- Grade I listed buildings in the East Riding of Yorkshire
- Listed buildings in Snaith and Cowick
