= Snaith =

Town in the East Riding of Yorkshire, England

Coordinates: 53.691223°N 1.028200°W

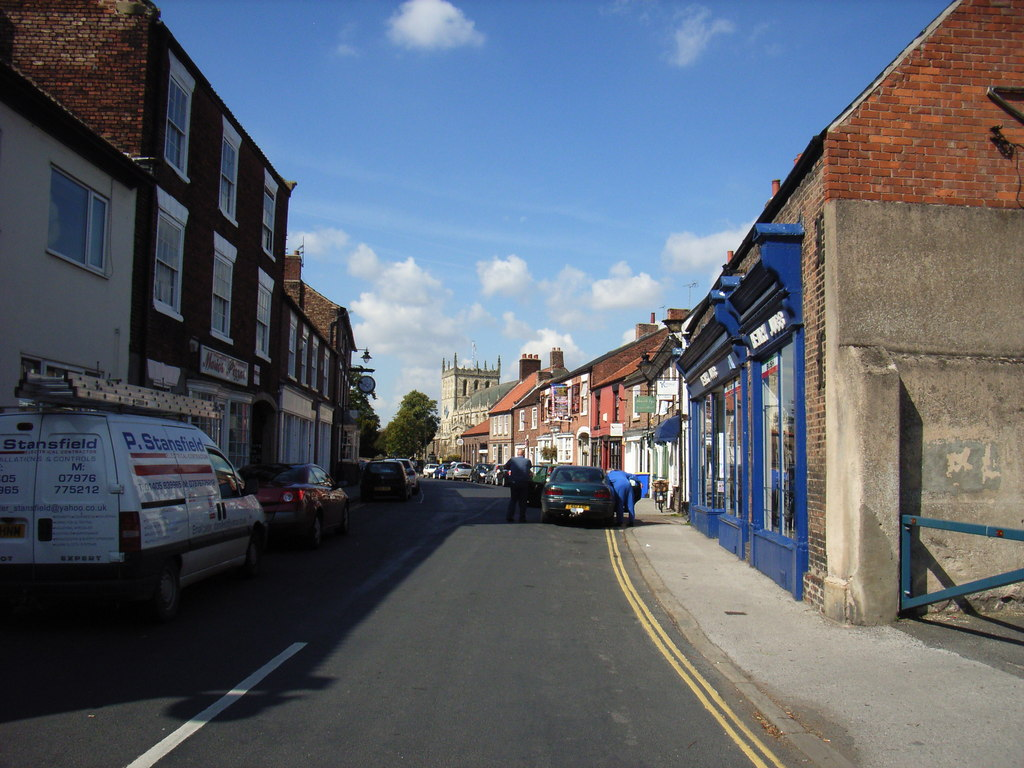
- Market Place, Snaith

- Location within the East Riding of Yorkshire
- Population: 3,554 (2021 Census)
- OS grid reference: SE642220
  - London: 160 mi (260 km) SSE
- Civil parish: Snaith and Cowick
- Unitary authority: East Riding of Yorkshire
- Ceremonial county: East Riding of Yorkshire
- Region: Yorkshire and the Humber
- Country: England
- Sovereign state: United Kingdom
- Post town: GOOLE
- Postcode district: DN14
- Dialling code: 01405
- Police: Humberside
- Fire: Humberside
- Ambulance: Yorkshire
- UK Parliament: Goole and Pocklington

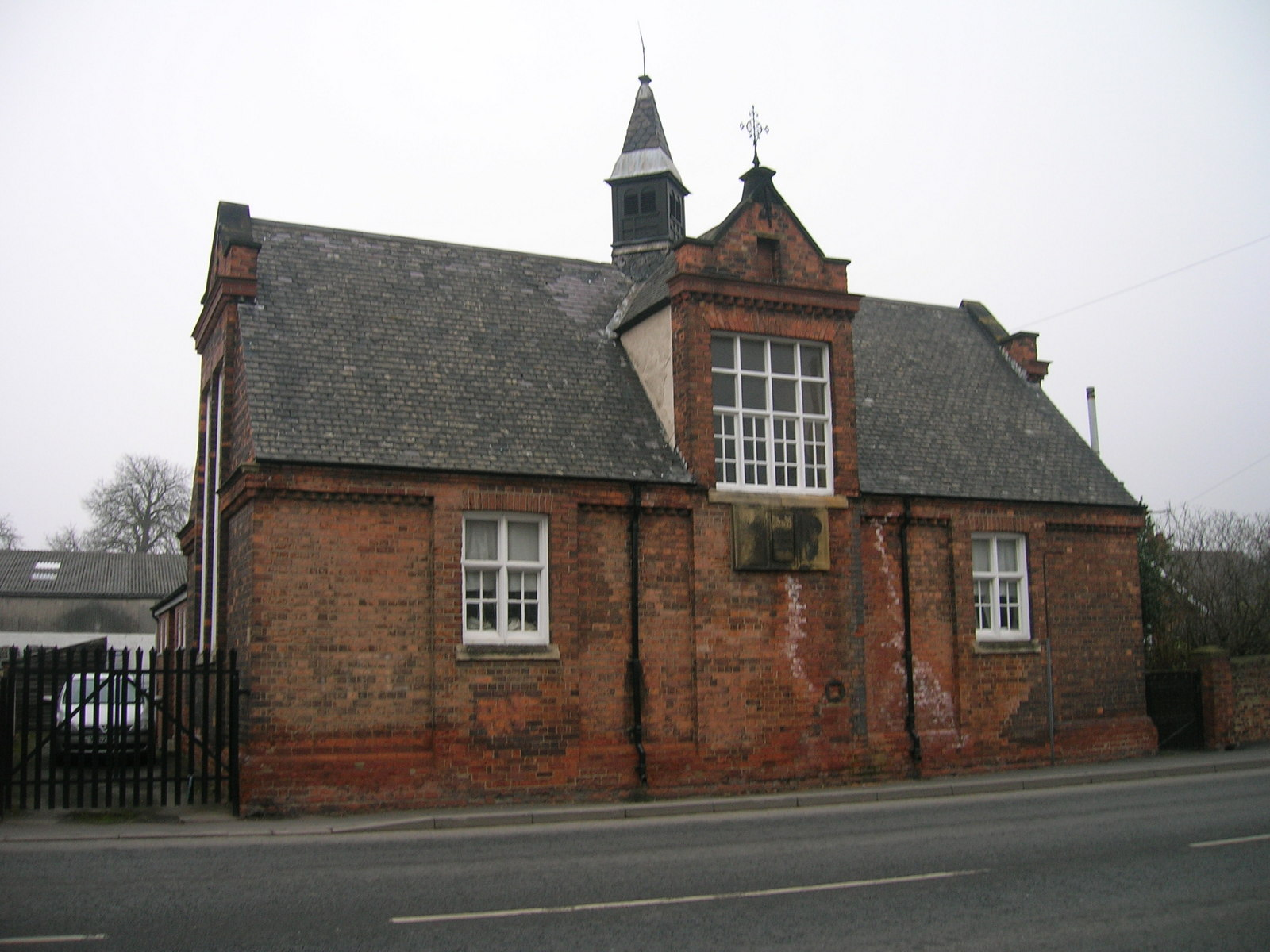
Old School, Snaith

Snaith is a market town in the civil parish of Snaith and Cowick in the East Riding of Yorkshire, England.

Snaith is administered by the East Riding of Yorkshire unitary authority and since the 2024 general election has formed part of the Goole and Pocklington constituency.

It stands close to the River Aire and the M62 and M18 motorways, 7 miles (11 km) west of Goole, 10 miles (16 km) east of Knottingley, 8 miles (13 km) south of Selby, 10 miles (16 km) southwest of Howden and 8 miles (13 km) northwest of Thorne.

== History ==
The name Snaith derives from the Old Scandinavian word sneið, meaning ‘piece of land cut off’. The name was recorded in its modern-day form in c. 1080 but in Domesday Book of 1086 it appears as Esneid.

The priory church, dedicated to St Laurence, was granted to Selby Abbey by Archbishop Gerard in the early twelfth century and became a small Benedictine cell of that house. In 1310 it was appropriated to Selby, with two monks made resident alongside a secular priest. Snaith received a royal charter to hold markets and fairs in 1223 under Henry III. For centuries the parish exercised its own ecclesiastical jurisdiction as a peculiar, with proceedings held in a local consistory court.

The church is low and wide, with pinnacles. Its core is Norman and cruciform but the tower, at the west end, is Early English. The chancel is Decorated Gothic and the nave has Perpendicular arcades and a high clerestory. Glass in the chancel window is by Francis Spear and there is a notable monument to Viscount Downe by Francis Chantrey.

The church was designated a Grade I listed building in 1967 and is now recorded in the National Heritage List for England, maintained by Historic England. Part of the former priory garth was taken when the railway was laid out along the north edge of the town between the church and the River Aire.

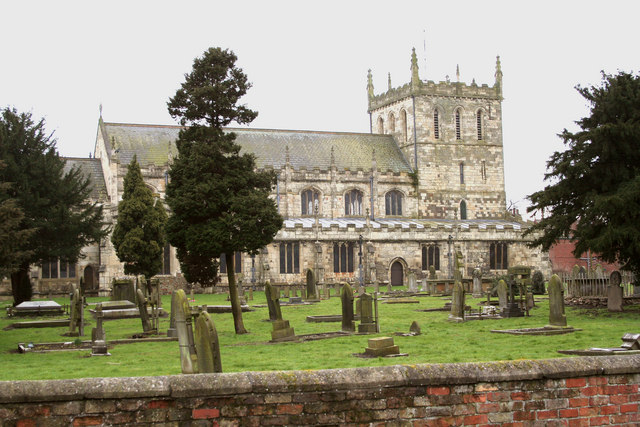
Priory Church of St Laurence, Snaith parish church

During the Second World War a bomber airfield, RAF Snaith, was established nearby at Pollington and operated from 1941 to 1946.

== Governance ==
Snaith is a part of the civil parish of Snaith and Cowick. It has no dedicated town hall but the town council meets in a building in the Market Place.

The town is administered by East Riding of Yorkshire Council within the Snaith, Airmyn, Rawcliffe and Marshland ward.

Since the 2024 general election Snaith has been in the Goole and Pocklington constituency, represented in the House of Commons by David Davis.

== Geography and landmarks ==
Snaith is located south of the River Aire, on the edge of the Lower Aire Washlands, where water is held in designated basins such as Snaith Ings during periods of high flow.

The principal landmark is the Priory Church of St Laurence, which is listed at Grade I. Other notable buildings include Snaith Hall, a small early 19th-century country house on Pontefract Road listed at Grade II, and the former lock-up in the Butter Market, also Grade II. Several buildings along the high street are also listed.

=== Town centre ===
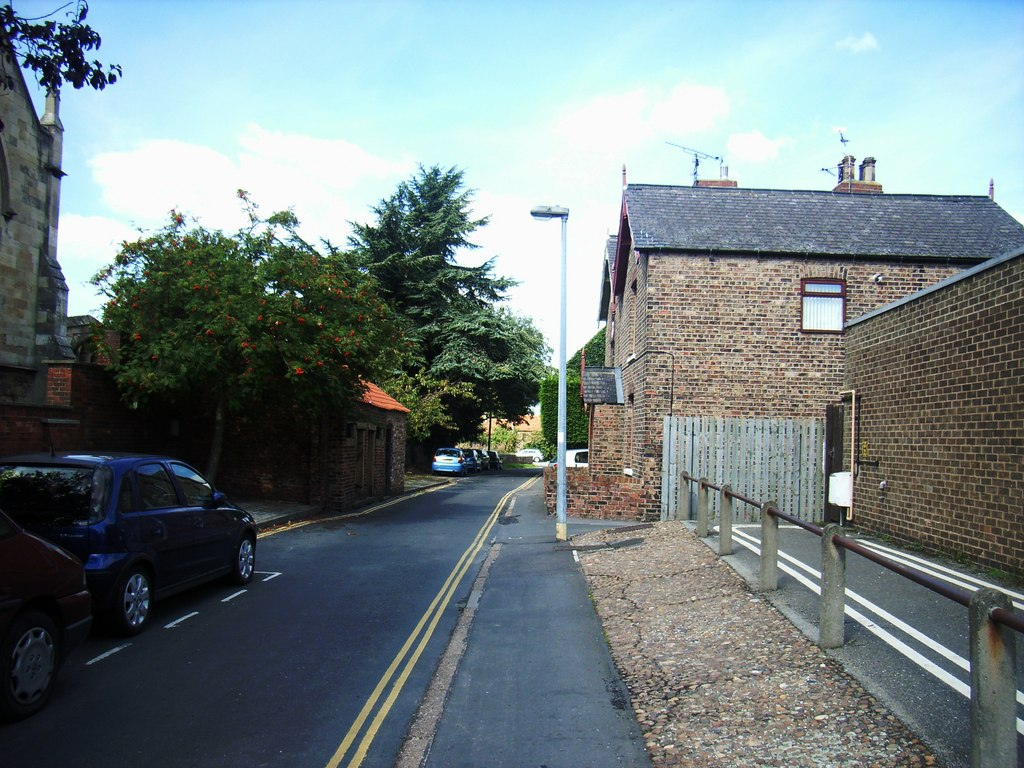
Butter Market, Snaith

Snaith town centre has a variety of amenities and many pubs and restaurants, takeaway and shops. The priory church is on the western side of town and Snaith Hall is immediately south of the town. The town also has a Methodist church on Cowick Road, a doctor's surgery on Butt Lane and a fire station in the Market Place.

== Demography ==
At the 2021 United Kingdom census Snaith (the built-up area) had 3,554 inhabitants and the wider civil parish of Snaith and Cowick had 3,865, up from 3,579 in 2011. Figures for the built-up area use the Office for National Statistics built-up-area geography.

== Sport ==
Snaith Juniors Football Club formed in 1990 as Croda F.C. on the grounds of Cowick Hall, then used by Croda International. Juniors F.C. now play on Ben Bailey housing estate and hold football tournaments at the end of May each year. The Garth, adjacent to the Methodist Chapel, was given to the people of Snaith for recreation and leisure.

Recreational cricket in the area includes the Snaith & District Evening Cricket League, which brings together local clubs for midweek fixtures.

The town has an active cycling club, the Marshes Cycling Club (MCC).

== Media ==
Television signals are received from either the Emley Moor or Belmont TV transmitters.

Local radio stations are BBC Radio Humberside, Nation Radio East Yorkshire, Greatest Hits Radio Yorkshire, Capital Yorkshire and Phoenix Community Radio, a community-based station that broadcasts from Goole.

The town is served by local newspaper, The Goole Times.

== Transport ==
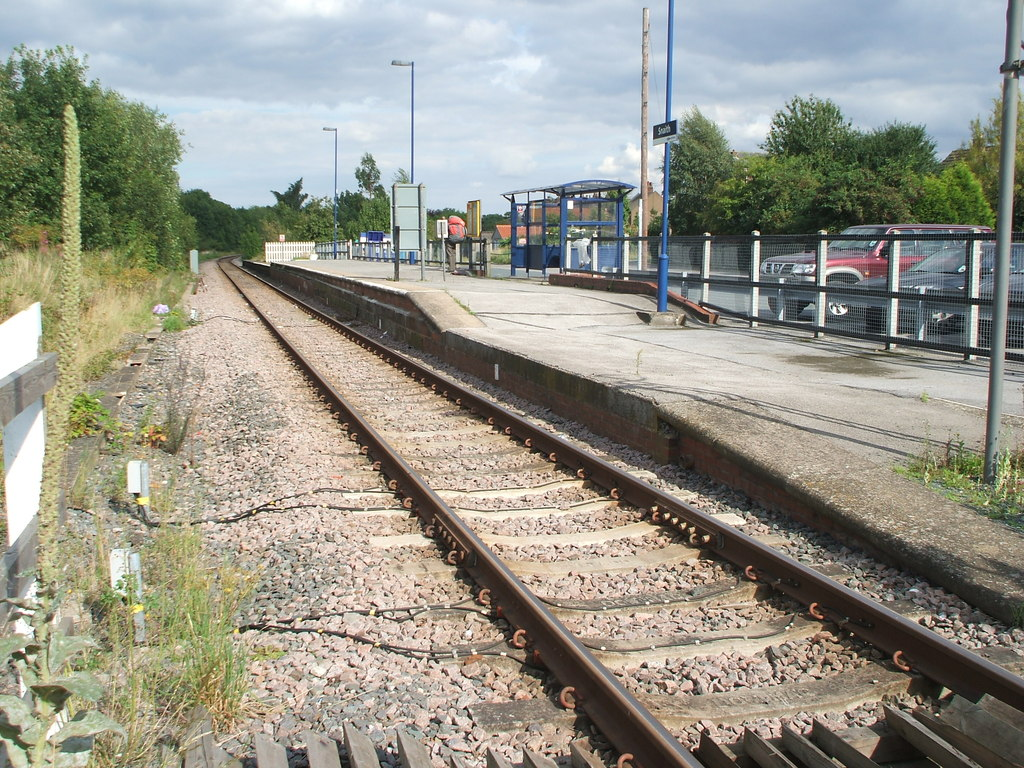
Snaith railway station

Snaith railway station has limited daily services to Leeds and Goole. It has no services on Sundays. The town used to have stations at Snaith and Pollington on the Hull and Barnsley and Great Central Joint Railway and in the nearby village of Carlton, Carlton Towers on the Hull and Barnsley Railway.

Local buses link Snaith with Selby and Goole. The 400/401 service, operated by Arriva Yorkshire, calls at Snaith railway station and Snaith Selby Road.

== See also ==
- Cowick Hall
- East Cowick
- Grade I listed churches in the East Riding of Yorkshire
- Listed buildings in Snaith and Cowick
- No. 578 Squadron RAF
- West Cowick
