= Goole and Pocklington =

UK Parliament constituency (since 2024)

Coordinates: 53.80°N 0.73°W

- County constituency for the House of Commons
- Boundaries since 2024
- Boundary of Goole and Pocklington in Yorkshire and the Humber
- County: East Riding of Yorkshire
- Major settlements: Goole, Pocklington, Howden, Snaith

Current constituency
- Created: 2024
- Member of Parliament: David Davis (Conservative)
- Seats: One
- Created from: Haltemprice and Howden; Brigg and Goole (part); East Yorkshire (part)

Goole and Pocklington is a constituency represented in the House of Commons of the UK Parliament. Further to the completion of the 2023 Periodic Review of Westminster constituencies, it was first contested at the 2024 general election. Its Member of Parliament (MP) is David Davis of the Conservative Party, the former Brexit Secretary. Davis previously represented the predecessor constituencies of Boothferry from 1987 to 1997, and Haltemprice and Howden from 1997 to 2024.

== Constituency profile ==
Goole and Pocklington is a large rural constituency located in the East Riding of Yorkshire. Its largest town is Goole, which has a population of around 20,000. The town contains the Port of Goole, which is the country's largest inland port and handles £800 million worth of trade each year. Other settlements include the small towns of Pocklington, Snaith, Howden and Brough and the villages of Stamford Bridge, Holme-on-Spalding-Moor, Gilberdyke, South Cave, North Ferriby and Swanland. There is some deprivation in Goole but the rest of the constituency is generally affluent. The average house price is lower than the rest of the country but higher than the rest of Yorkshire.

Compared to the rest of the country, residents are older, more religious and have high levels of homeownership. They have average levels of education and high rates of household income and professional employment. White people made up 97% of the population at the 2021 census. Most of the constituency is represented by Conservatives at the local council, although Pocklington elected Liberal Democrats and some independents were elected in Howden and Goole. An estimated 59% of voters in the constituency supported leaving the European Union in the 2016 referendum, higher than the nationwide figure of 52%.

== Boundaries ==
The constituency contains the following electoral wards of the East Riding of Yorkshire:

- Dale, Goole North, Goole South, Howden, Howdenshire, Pocklington Provincial, Snaith, Airmyn, Rawcliffe & Marshland, South Hunsley, and Wolds Weighton (small part).

It comprises the following areas:

- Goole and Snaith from the abolished seat of Brigg and Goole
- Pocklington from the East Yorkshire constituency (renamed Bridlington and the Wolds)
- Howden and North Ferriby, with rural areas to the north of the Humber in between, from the abolished constituency of Haltemprice and Howden (comprising half of the new seat's electorate)

== Members of Parliament ==
Haltemprice and Howden prior to 2024

| Election | Member | Party |
|---|---|---|
| 2024 | David Davis | Conservative |

== Elections ==
=== Elections in the 2020s ===
General election 2024: Goole and Pocklington
| Party | Candidate | Votes | % | ±% |
|---|---|---|---|---|
| Conservative | David Davis | 18,981 | 38.2 | −26.9 |
| Labour | Liam Draycott | 15,409 | 31.0 | +10.6 |
| Reform | Rich Kelly | 9,054 | 18.2 | N/A |
| Liberal Democrats | Dale Richard Needham | 3,380 | 6.8 | −1.0 |
| Green | Angela Stone | 2,451 | 4.9 | +1.0 |
| Independent | Shona Wade | 467 | 0.9 | N/A |
| Majority | | 3,572 | 7.2 | −37.5 |
| Turnout | | 49,742 | 63.5 | −1.9 |
| Registered electors | | 78,287 | | |
| Conservative hold | | Swing | −18.8 | |

=== Elections in the 2010s ===
2019 notional result
| Party | Vote | % |
|---|---|---|
| Conservative | 32,492 | 65.1 |
| Labour | 10,190 | 20.4 |
| Liberal Democrats | 3,882 | 7.8 |
| Green | 1,950 | 3.9 |
| Yorkshire | 1,387 | 2.8 |
| Turnout | 49,901 | 65.4 |
| Electorate | 76,337 | |

== See also ==
- List of parliamentary constituencies in Humberside
- List of parliamentary constituencies in the Yorkshire and the Humber (region)
