= A63 road =

Road in Yorkshire, England

A63

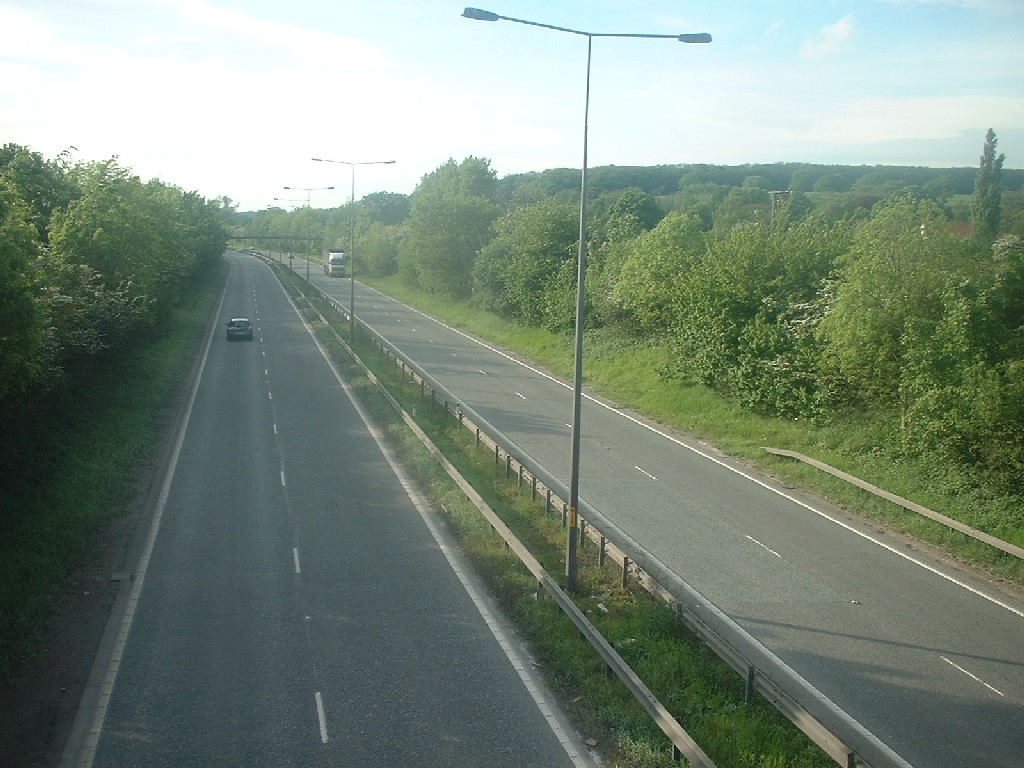
- The A63(T) looking west from near Brough

Route information
- Part of E20
- Length: 59.6 mi (95.9 km)

Major junctions
- West end: A61 in Leeds
- M1 near Leeds A1(M) near Ledsham; A19 near Brayton M62 in Howden; A15 in North Ferriby

- East end: A1033 in Kingston upon Hull

Location
- Country: United Kingdom
- Counties: West Yorkshire; North Yorkshire; East Riding of Yorkshire
- Primary destinations: Selby

Road network
- Roads in the United Kingdom; Motorways; A and B road zones
| ← A62 | → A64 |

The A63 is a major road in Yorkshire, England between Leeds and Kingston upon Hull. A section between North Cave and Hull forms the eastward continuation of the M62 motorway and is part of the unsigned Euroroute E20.

== Route ==
=== Leeds to Howden ===
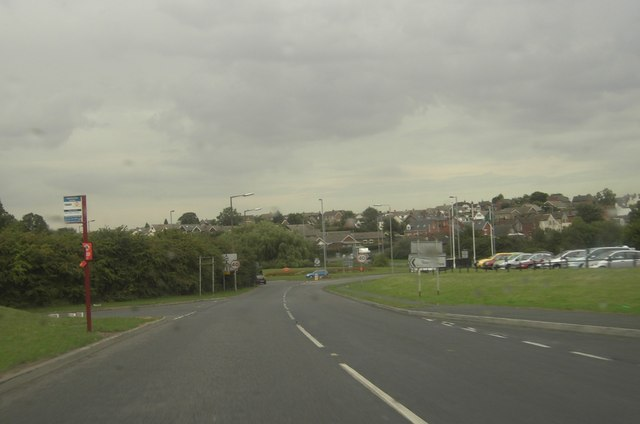
A642 roundabout at Garforth

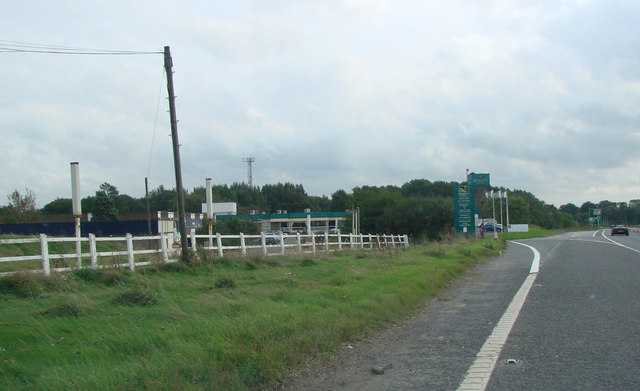
Selby Fork Hotel

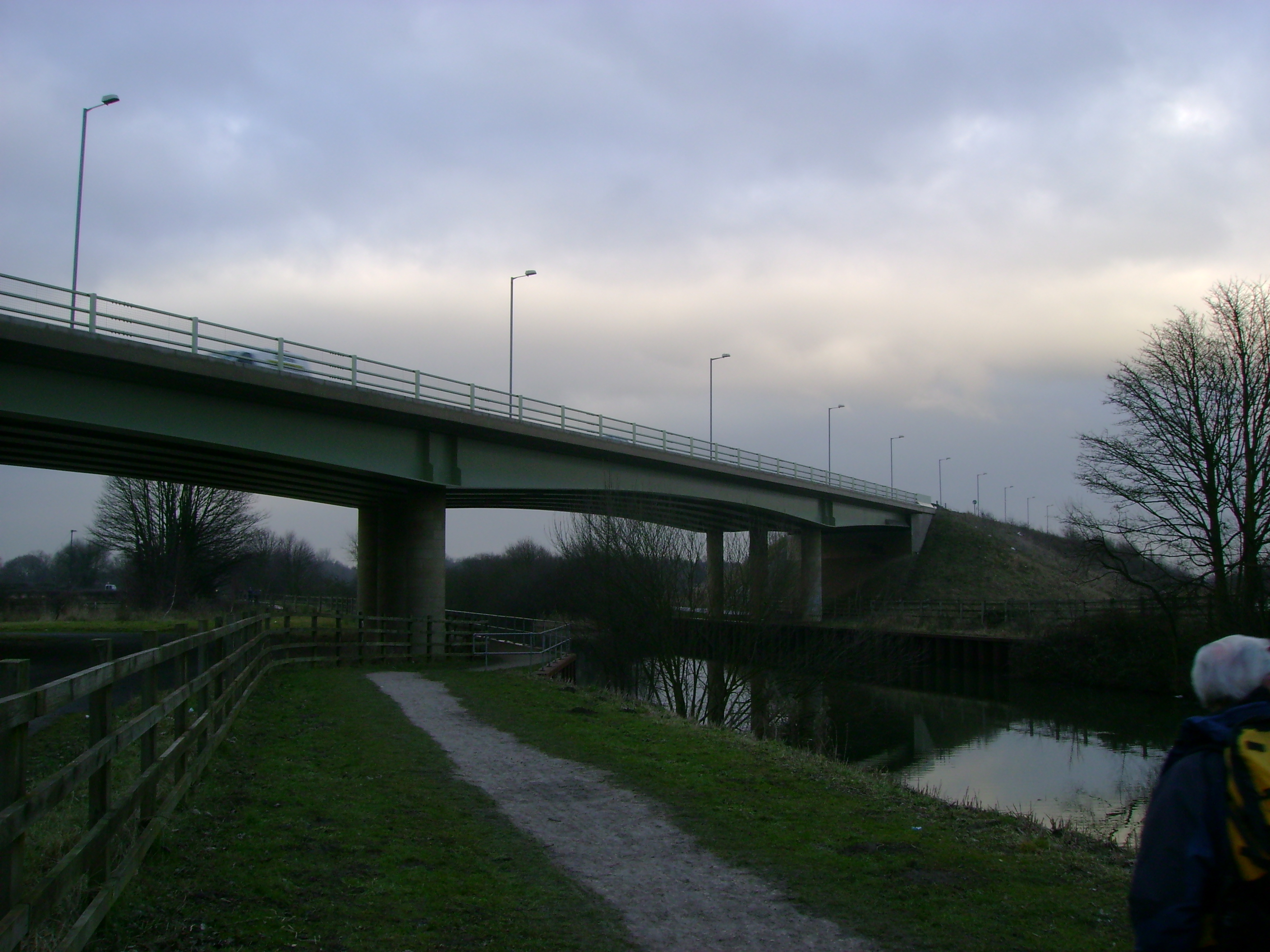
The Selby Canal

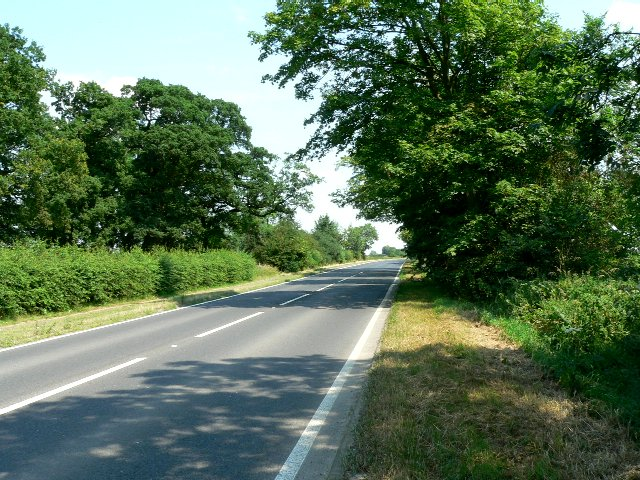
East of Hemingbrough

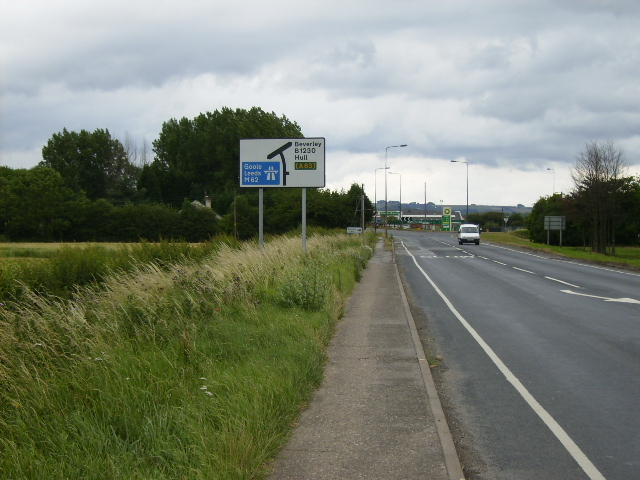
Junction 38 of the M62 seen from the former A63

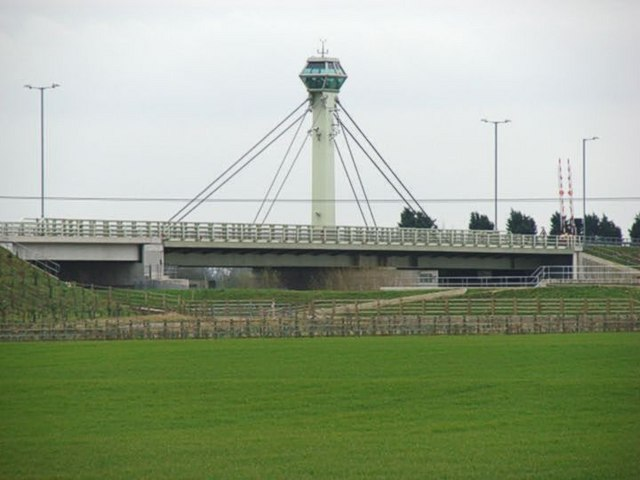
Selby (Ouse) swing bridge

The route from Leeds out to Selby runs roughly parallel, and between 0.6 and 2.0 miles (0.97 and 3.22 km) south of the route of the Leeds and Selby Railway.

The route begins just east of Leeds city centre at a junction with the A61, although, before its February 2009 realignment along the new East Leeds Link Road, it began at a junction with the A64 in the Halton Moor area of the city (now signed as the B6159). The road passes through the Knowsthorpe and Cross Green areas, as Pontefract Lane; despite being of dual carriageway standard, this stretch is subject to a 40 mph speed limit, and incorporates peak-time HOV lanes. At the end of this dual carriageway section, the route meets the M1, and the road continues north along the motorway for one junction then resumes as the A63.

From junction 46 of the M1, the Thorpe Park roundabout, the route continues east, meeting the A642 at Garforth. There is a turning for Lidgett Lane (B6137) to the left, next to Garforth Academy, with the Shell garage on the right. It crosses the Leeds Country Way (a former railway), and there is the B6137 to the right for Kippax. On the Garforth/Micklefield parish boundary is a roundabout with the A656 Roman Ridge.

At the Boot and Shoe junction, with the former A1, there is the Esso Boot & Shoe Service Station, and the Best Western Milford Hotel. There is a grade-separated left turn for the B1222 (for Sherburn-in-Elmet). This dual-carriageway section of the former A1, follows the Leeds – North Yorkshire boundary (Ledsham and South Milford), and was built as part of the Brotherton-Micklefield scheme in November 1964 by Dowsett Engineering Construction. At the Selby Fork junction south of the Selby Fork Hotel, the A1246 continues southwards along the former A1, and the road enters the former Selby District, in North Yorkshire.

It crosses the A1(M) at junction 42 at South Milford. It meets the A162 at a roundabout, crosses a railway, and passes through Monk Fryston. It follows Causeway Dike and passes through Hambleton, where to the east it crosses the Selby Diversion of the East Coast Main Line, and the A1238 (former A63) at a roundabout. The route follows the six-mile £44 million Selby Bypass and £5 million Barlby Bypass, the latter of which is shared with the north–south A19, although the A19 still passes through Selby itself. On the bypass the road passes Selby Golf Club, meets the A19 at a roundabout at Brayton, crosses the Selby Canal, crosses the Doncaster-Selby railway, meets the A1041 at a roundabout, and crosses the River Ouse on the River Ouse swing bridge and the Selby-Hull railway. The short section around Barlby follows what was the old East Coast Main Line railway before the Selby Diversion opened in the early 1980s. An alternative route eastwards from the Selby bypass, to the M62, is the A1041 via Camblesforth, then the A645 past Drax power station. The route out to Hull is shadowed by the Selby-Hull railway line.

It leaves at the Barlby Roundabout (completed May 2013; formerly a dangerous road junction) to the right, passing Osgodby then over the railway line and passes Hemingbrough. A planned bypass at Osgodby (2002) was cancelled due to increases in prices of land. It crosses the River Derwent and enters the East Riding of Yorkshire. It passes through Newsholme before bypassing Howden to the west, as Barnhill Lane and Boothferry Road, where it meets the A614 at a roundabout. Access to the M62 is via junction 37 to the south, along the A614.

East of Howden, the A63 has been downgraded and is now the B1230. The B1230 carries non-motorway traffic over the M62 motorway and onwards into Gilberdyke. When the B1230 was the A63, a three-mile section, through Gilberdyke and Newport, was dual carriageway. Where the B1230 crosses the M62 motorway east of Newport, the M62 finishes and the A63 restarts. Before the last eastern section of the M62 was built, the motorway terminated at a temporary junction at Balkholme. Before the M62 opened, the single carriageway A63 was Hull's main route to the South of England, causing many bottlenecks.

=== North Cave to Hull ===
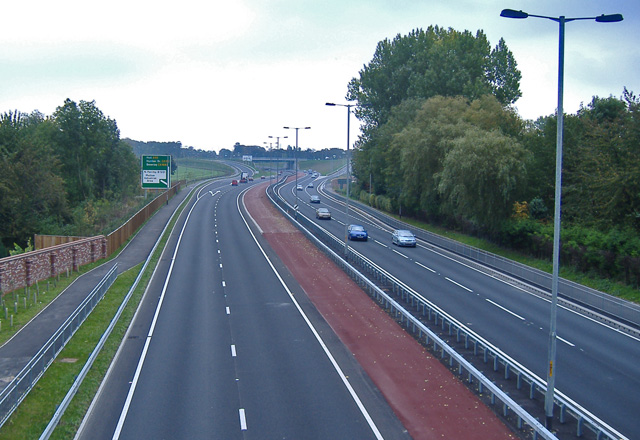
Melton interchange

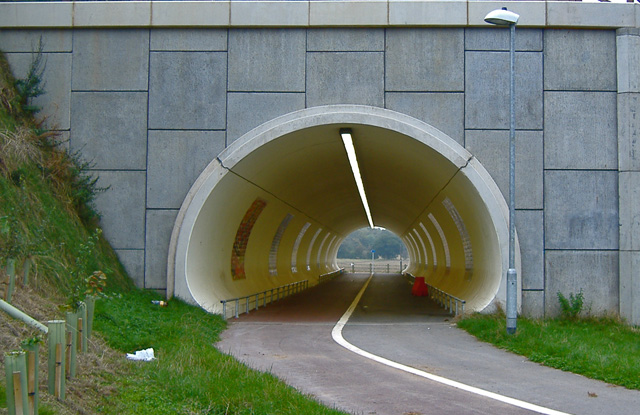
Underpass at 2006/7 Melton junction (Wolds Way)

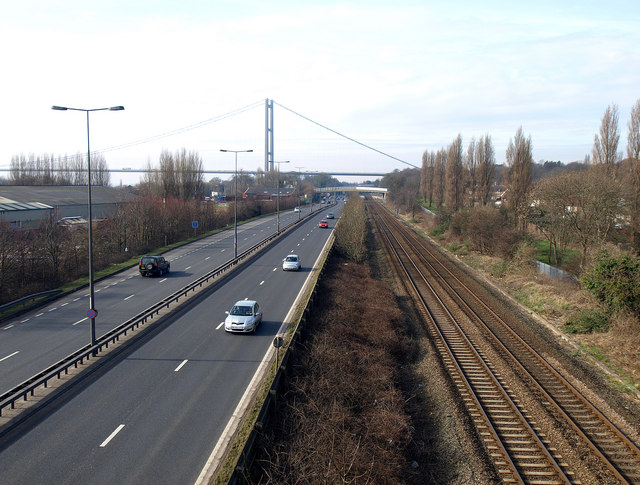
The railway line near the Humber Bridge

The section from junction 38 of the M62 (its terminus) to the A1034 junction near South Cave was single carriageway before the M62 opened in May 1976. The section was constructed as the dualling of the Caves Bypass and opened when the last eastern section of the M62 opened, completing the dual carriageway link to the outskirts of Hull. The £2 million contract was given to Clugston, and work started in February 1975. From junction 38, the B1230 leads to North Cave (and in the direction of Beverley) along the former A63. The BP Triangle North Cave is alongside the junction.

There is the Beacon Service Area on the eastbound side, with a Travelodge "Hull South Cave" and Shell Beacon, situated just south of Everthorpe and Wolds prisons. The road skirts the southern edge of South Cave, and near Ellerker it crosses the former route (and Ermine Street from Brough, then known as Petuaria, to York) at the A1034 junction.

The 2.5 miles (4 km) Elloughton bypass was built in October 1971, from the A1034 to the Welton/Brough junction passing Brantingham to the west. It replaced the former road through Elloughton and Brough. This section skirts the southern edge of the Yorkshire Wolds. The £1,629,850 contract for 3.25 miles was given on 10 October 1969 to Gleeson Civil Engineering; the site office was on Brantingham Road; the eastbound carriageway opened on Sunday 21 March 1971; part of the dual section opened on Monday 13 September 1971; the bypass fully opened on Friday 29 October 1971.

The Welton/Brough – North Ferriby section opened in the late summer of 1963. Martin Cowley Ltd, of Derbyshire, was given the £156,947 contract in August 1961 for the two-mile section. At the Elloughton-cum-Brough-Welton parish boundary, there is a grade-separated junction for Brough to the south and Welton to the north. The road passes on the south side of South Hunsley School (with a leisure centre) at Melton, part of the parish of Welton.

A new grade separated junction was constructed east of Melton near North Ferriby in 2006/7. The Shell Grand Dale filling station is on the westbound side, west of the Melton interchange. The Yorkshire Wolds Way crosses at this point.

The North Ferriby bypass and North Ferriby – Hessle sections opened in 1961. Martin Cowley Ltd of Clay Cross, in Derbyshire, was given the contract for the two-mile bypass, for £281,851 in August 1959, to take 20 months from October 1959; it was opened on Friday 25 August 1961. The former route is partly the B1231 (for Swanland). The road meets the A15 at a grade-separated junction. The former route, before the South Docks Road improvement, followed the current A1105 into Hull.

The road continues through the Humber Bridge Country Park, across the Hull-Selby railway, and under the Humber Bridge. The Humber Bridge was designed to take some of Hull's traffic southwards, but the vast majority takes the A63 westwards, towards the M18. The road passes on the south side of Hessle, next to Hessle railway station, and follows the Hull to Selby railway line closely on the southern side as far as the outskirts of Hull near the western docks.

=== Within Kingston upon Hull ===
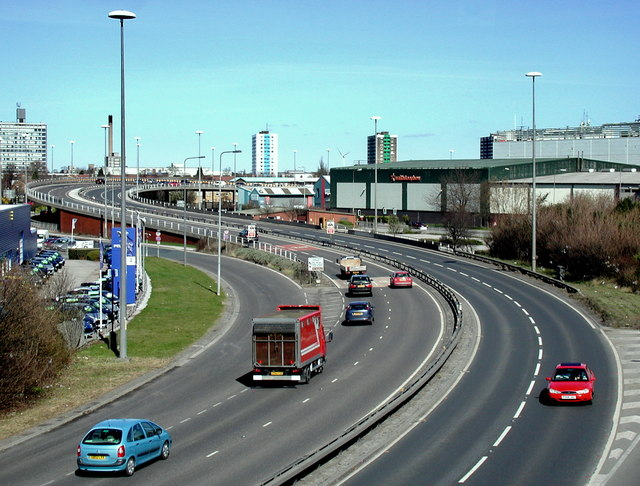
Flyover near the Smith & Nephew factory

The section from Hessle into Kingston upon Hull is named Clive Sullivan Way, after the rugby league footballer Clive Sullivan, (originally titled the South Docks Road). There is a junction with Priory Way, and at Gipsyville it meets the A1166 at a grade-separated roundabout near St Andrew's Quay. Near the Albert Dock, there is a fly-over where it rejoins the former Hessle Road next to the Smith & Nephew factory to the south.

==== Castle Street ====
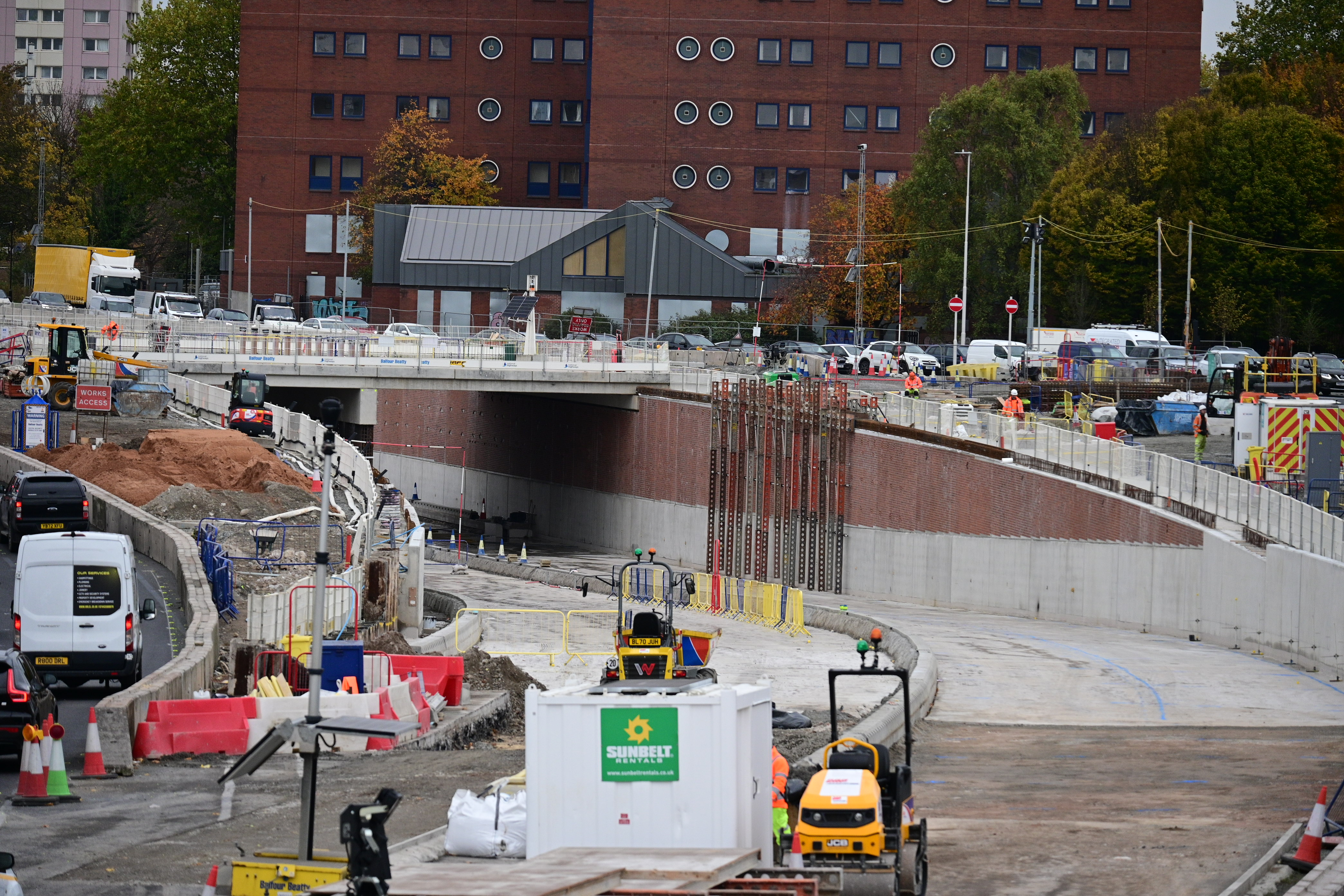
The Mytongate underpass under construction in October 2025

The A63 meets the A1079 (for central Hull) at a junction, beyond which the road is named Castle Street. The Castle Street section of the road (2011) had significant air pollution problems (NO_{2} levels), with over 55,000 vehicles per day, and had heavy congestion, having been at full capacity for around a decade; much of the traffic is heavy goods vehicles originating as a result of Ro-Ro activity at Hull Docks. The road section also was experiencing high accident levels, as well as forming a barrier to local north–south movement within the city centre. Improvement schemes for the road had been planned since the 1980s, but were subject to funding delays.

Consultation on the design of a solution began 2009. Split level junctions including passing under or over the A63 were considered for the bottleneck at the Mytongate roundabout, (Note: 53.74046°N 0.34347°W, Mytongate / A63 roundabout) with additional congestion easing measures, and pedestrian bridges. Other options included an extended viaduct and tunnel options – the consultation showed a preference for an underground solution. In March 2010 the Highways Agency established a preferred scheme – the A63 would be lowered 23-foot (7 m) at the Mytongate bottleneck, and the north south connecting roads raised slightly (3.3-foot (1 m)), creating a split level junction; additionally the eastbound carriageway would be widened, and pedestrian crossings created. If funded, construction was planned to begin in 2016 for completion in 2019. The cost has been estimated at between £150 and £200 million. In May 2012 the design and consultation work was initiated. In June 2013 the government announced the go ahead for a £160 million improvement to the road after 2015.

Archaeological excavation ahead of construction began in October 2020 and uncovered traces of a medieval settlement and parts of the eighteenth-century New Gaol in a year-long dig. From 2021, work began on Mytongate. It was predicted to be finished in 2025, but in December 2024 a year-long delay was announced. The underpass was opened to traffic in late March 2026. A bridge called Murdoch's Connection was also constructed further east than the junction between the Princes Quay Shopping Centre and Hull Marina which allows for safe pedestrian crossing and fewer traffic lights, as well as greater connection between the main city centre area to the upmarket Humber Street area of the city centre.

The construction site overlapped the historic Trinity cemetery and the work required exhumation and reburial of 9,500 bodies. The remains were reburied in a part of the burial ground not affected by the roadworks, which was reconsecrated by Eleanor Sanderson, the Bishop of Hull, in July 2026.

==== Roger Millward Way ====
It crosses the River Hull at Myton Swing Bridge, near the River Hull tidal surge barrier and The Deep. The stretch over Myton Bridge and within the ward of Drypool is known as Roger Millward Way. It was originally named Garrison Road but the name was changed to Roger Millward Way in memory of the deceased rugby player in 2018. Within Drypool there is a northwards junction with the A1165 (Great Union Street), and southwards junction connecting the Victoria Dock Village housing estate at the same point. The road terminates at a junction for the A1033 (Hedon Road). It is prone to congestion due to traffic from the Port of Hull and vehicles exiting Victoria Dock heading into the city centre.

== Proposed diversion ==
A proposal to divert the road along a causeway between Hessle and Hull Docks was unveiled in 2019. The £1.5 billion project would have a dual carriageway road veering into the estuary and take all of the through traffic from the A63 away from the centre of Hull.

== Junction list ==
| County | Location | mi | km | Destinations | Notes |
|---|---|---|---|---|---|
| West Yorkshire | Leeds | 0.0 | 0.0 | A61 (South Accommodation Road) to A58 / A64 / A653 / A639 – City centre, Wakefield, Dewsbury, Pontefract, Rothwell, Harrogate, Wetherby, York, Selby | Western terminus |
| West Yorkshire | Leeds | 2.5 | 4.0 | M1 south to M62 – The South, London, Wakefield, Manchester, Hull | London, Wakefield, Manchester and Hull signed westbound only, The South eastbound only; western terminus of M1 concurrency; M1 junction 45 |
| West Yorkshire | Swillington | 5.3 | 8.5 | M1 north to A1 / A64 – The North, Wetherby, York A6120 west (Ring Road) – Leeds | The North signed eastbound only, To A64, York and Leeds westbound only; eastern terminus of M1 concurrency; eastern terminus of A6120; M1 junction 46 |
| West Yorkshire | Garforth | 6.4 | 10.3 | A642 (Wakefield Road) – Wakefield, Garforth | |
| West Yorkshire | Garforth– Kippax– Ledston boundary | 8.8 | 14.2 | A656 / A1(M) / A64 / A639 – Wetherby, York, Castleford, Pontefract, Aberford | To A1(M), A64, Wetherby and York signed eastbound only, Aberford westbound only |
| West Yorkshire– North Yorkshire boundary | Ledsham– South Milford boundary | 10.6– 10.9 | 17.1– 17.5 | B1222 – Sherburn in Elmet | Junction |
| North Yorkshire | South Milford | 11.8 | 19.0 | A1246 south – Brotherton, Fairburn, Ledsham | Northern terminus of A1246 |
| North Yorkshire | South Milford | 12.1– 12.3 | 19.5– 19.8 | A1(M) / M62 – The North, The South, Wetherby, Manchester, Hull | A1(M) junction 42 |
| North Yorkshire | Monk Fryston | 13.5 | 21.7 | A162 to A64 – Tadcaster, York, Ferrybridge | |
| North Yorkshire | Hambleton | 18.3 | 29.5 | A1238 east (Leeds Road) – Thorpe Willoughby | Western terminus of A1238 |
| North Yorkshire | Brayton | 20.3 | 32.7 | A19 (Doncaster Road) to M62 west – Selby, Doncaster, Brayton, Burn | |
| North Yorkshire | Brayton | 21.7 | 34.9 | A1041 (Bawtry Road) to M62 east / A614 – Selby, Goole, Snaith, Camblesforth | Camblesforth signed westbound only |
| North Yorkshire | Barlby with Osgodby | 24.0 | 38.6 | A19 south – Selby | Western terminus of A19 concurrency |
| North Yorkshire | Barlby with Osgodby | 24.5 | 39.4 | A19 north / Barlby By-Pass – York, Barlby | Eastern terminus of A19 concurrency |
| East Riding of Yorkshire | Boothferry | 33.2 | 53.4 | A614 south (Boothferry Road) – Goole, Rawcliffe, Airmyn | Western terminus of A614 concurrency |
| East Riding of Yorkshire | Howden | 34.0 | 54.7 | A614 north (Boothferry Road) – Bridlington, Howden | Eastern terminus of A614 concurrency |
| East Riding of Yorkshire | Howden | 34.4 | 55.4 | M62 west to M18 / M180 – Leeds, Goole | To M18 and M180 signed eastbound only, Goole westbound only; western terminus of M62 concurrency; M62 junction 37 |
| East Riding of Yorkshire | North Cave | 41.9– 42.5 | 67.4– 68.4 | B1230 – North Cave, Gilberdyke, Newport | Junction; North Cave and Gilberdyke signed eastbound only, Newport westbound only; eastern terminus of M62 concurrency; eastern terminus of M62; M62 junction 38 |
| East Riding of Yorkshire | South Cave– Ellerker boundary | 45.3– 45.7 | 72.9– 73.5 | A1034 north – Market Weighton, South Cave, York | Junction; York signed eastbound only; southern terminus of A1034 |
| East Riding of Yorkshire | Elloughton-cum-Brough– Welton boundary | 48.3 | 77.7 | Elloughton, Brough, Welton | Junction |
| East Riding of Yorkshire | Welton– North Ferriby boundary | 49.5– 49.9 | 79.7– 80.3 | B1231 – North Ferriby, Swanland, Melton | Junction; Swanland and Melton signed westbound only |
| East Riding of Yorkshire | North Ferriby | 51.7– 52.1 | 83.2– 83.8 | A15 south to A164 – Wetherby, Humber Bridge, York | Junction; York signed westbound only; northern terminus of A15 |
| East Riding of Yorkshire | Hessle– Kingston upon Hull boundary | 53.8– 54.3 | 86.6– 87.4 | Hessle | Junction |
| East Riding of Yorkshire | Kingston upon Hull | 55.8– 56.2 | 89.8– 90.4 | Ring Road (A1166 west) | Junction; eastern terminus of A1166 |
| East Riding of Yorkshire | Kingston upon Hull | 56.8– 57.2 | 91.4– 92.1 | To A1105 – Anlaby | Junction |
| East Riding of Yorkshire | Kingston upon Hull | 57.6 | 92.7 | A1079 north – Beverley, Hull | Junction; eastbound exit and entrance; southern terminus of A1079 |
| East Riding of Yorkshire | Kingston upon Hull | 58.5 | 94.1 | Great Union Street (A1165 north) / Plimsoll Way – City centre (north) | Southern terminus of A1165 |
| East Riding of Yorkshire | Kingston upon Hull | 58.8– 59.6 | 94.6– 95.9 | A1033 west – Bridlington, York, Beverley, Withernsea, Hedon | Eastern terminus |
1.000 mi = 1.609 km; 1.000 km = 0.621 mi
