= Drewton =

Hamlet in the East Riding of Yorkshire, England

Coordinates: 53.783181°N 0.609154°W

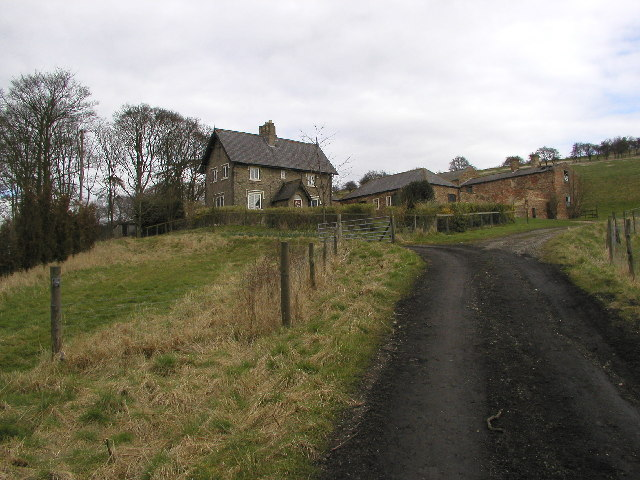
- A farmhouse in Drewton

- Location within the East Riding of Yorkshire
- OS grid reference: SE917327
  - London: 165 mi (266 km) S
- Civil parish: South Cave
- Unitary authority: East Riding of Yorkshire
- Ceremonial county: East Riding of Yorkshire
- Region: Yorkshire and the Humber
- Country: England
- Sovereign state: United Kingdom
- Post town: BROUGH
- Postcode district: HU15
- Dialling code: 01430
- Police: Humberside
- Fire: Humberside
- Ambulance: Yorkshire
- UK Parliament: Goole and Pocklington

Drewton is a hamlet in the East Riding of Yorkshire, England. It is situated on the A1034 road, 6 miles (10 km) south-east from Market Weighton and 11 miles (18 km) west from Hull city centre, and forms part of the civil parish of South Cave.

== History ==
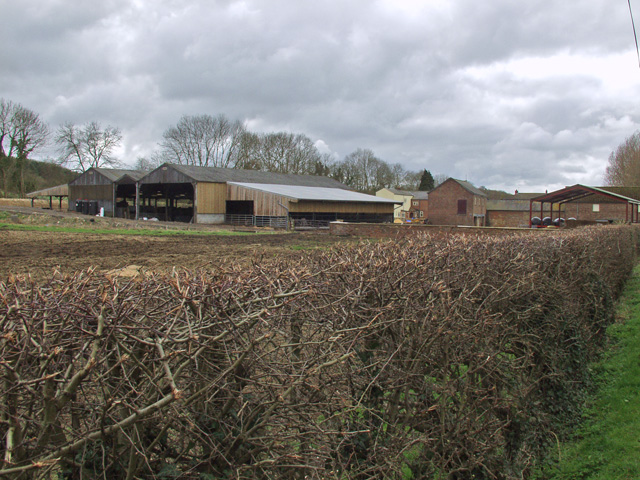
Drewton Manor Farm

The name Drewton possibly derives from the Old English Drowatūn meaning 'Drowa's settlement'.

In the 1086 Domesday Book Drewton is written as "Drowetone". The manor, in the East Riding Hundred of Cave, comprised 11 households, 6 villagers and 5 smallholders, with 2 ploughlands. Lordship of the manor of Drewton had passed to Robert Malet, who also became Tenant-in-chief.

The Domesday settlement at Drewton became a partly deserted medieval village (DMV), possibly at the time of the 14th-century Black Death. There was a further decline in the second half of the 17th century to leave only Drewton Manor and a farmhouse. Four houses were added in the mid-20th century. A later Drewton Manor, built in stone about 1850, is the centre of the Drewton Estate, which includes residential buildings, gardens, a lake, and a farm of 1,138 acres (4.6 km^{2}). The Estate, which today holds game shoots, was valued at £6 million when offered for sale in 2004.

In 1823 Drewton was in the Wapentake of Harthill, and, with Everthorpe, had a population of 177, six of which were farmers and another a 'gentlewoman'. In 1892 Drewton was recorded as a joint township with Everthorpe of 2,114 acres (8.6 km^{2}), and described as being on the edge of the Yorkshire Wolds with views of York Minster, Goole, Howden, Selby Abbey, the Humber, and the Lincolnshire coast. The settlement was the location of South Cave railway station on the Hull and Barnsley Railway.

At Drewton is a naturally formed stone monolith called St Austin's Stone. Bulmer's History and Directory of East Yorkshire repeats what it says is a commonly held view that Drewton's name might derive from 'Druids' town', and mentions the "huge monolith" of "St Augustine's Stone" that was supposed to be connected with Druid worship, and as the place where Saint Augustine preached to the Saxons, although stating that no record of the saint exists of him ever visiting Yorkshire. A Roman road which crossed the Humber at Brough passed through or near Drewton, the Roman occupation leaving many remains in the settlement.

== See also ==
- Brantingham
- Hotham
- North Cave
