= HM Prison Humber =

Prison in the East Riding of Yorkshire, England

Coordinates: 53.7695°N 0.6411°W

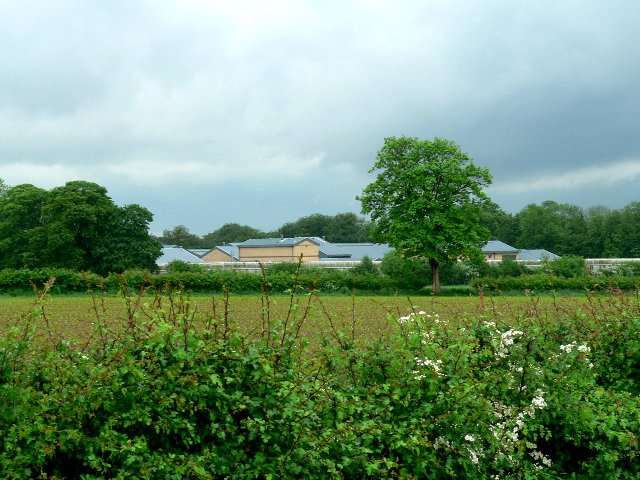
- Interactive map of HM Prison Humber
- Location: Everthorpe, East Riding of Yorkshire
- Status: Operational
- Security class: Adult Male/Category C
- Capacity: 1062 (April 2020)
- Opened: 2014
- Managed by: HM Prison Services
- Governor: Marcella Goligher

HM Prison Humber is a Category C men's prison, located south-west of Everthorpe, (near Brough) in the East Riding of Yorkshire, England. The prison is operated by His Majesty's Prison Service, and was created from the 2014 merger of two neighbouring prisons: HM Prison Everthorpe and HM Prison Wolds.

== History ==
=== HMP Everthorpe ===
Created as a borstal in 1958, Everthorpe was converted to house male convicts in 1991. After a two-day riot during the Christmas and New Year period of 1995/1996, the prison was criticised for its lack of security, bad management and the deployment of inexperienced staff during the riot. The prison was substantially expanded in 2005, but was criticised by the Chief Inspector of Prisons in 2006 because places on resettlement and offending behaviour programmes had "failed to keep pace" with the increased number of prisoners held at the prison.

=== HMP Wolds ===
In 1991, G4S won the UK's first private sector prison management contract. Initially a remand prison, HMP Wolds opened in April 1992, becoming a local Category B prison holding sentenced prisoners in 1993. In 2001, HMP Wolds was re-rolled again to a Category C training prison, holding adult males (including prisoners serving second stage life sentences). The prison reverted to the public sector in 2013.

=== Merger ===
In June 2013, it was announced that HM Prisons Everthorpe and Wolds would be merged into one larger prison, to be named HMP Humber. The merger took effect in April 2014 and a secure connecting corridor between the two prisons was completed in May 2015. However, the merger was said to have been "traumatic and prolonged", according to a HM Inspectorate of Prisons report, with "significant" delays in the corridor being built and changes to the staffing structure.

== Current prison ==
A further Inspectorate report in 2018 noted the prison's "robust" approach to drug usage, including photocopying of inmate mail in a bid to prevent drug-soaked letters being smuggled in. The report also found high levels of victimisation, intimidation and violence, much of it "underpinned by a pervasive drug culture", but said the prison was well led, staff appeared committed and there was an apparent "new-found and growing confidence about its future".

In 2018, the Ministry of Justice recorded 490 assaults at Humber Prison, 182 more than the previous year. These included 118 attacks on staff, nine of which were considered "serious". There were also 792 self-harm incidents (up from 582 in 2017) and four deaths in custody, one adjudged to be self-inflicted.

In December 2019, HMP Humber confirmed that one inmate had been diagnosed with tuberculosis.

In April 2020 during the COVID-19 pandemic, Humber was identified as one of six jails which would be provided with modular buildings, adapted from shipping containers, to provide additional single prison cell accommodation to help counter the spread of coronavirus.
