= John Stephenson (cricketer, born 1903) =

English cricketer

John Stewart Stephenson (10 November 1903 – 7 October 1975) was an English first-class cricketer, who played nineteen matches for Oxford University, and sixteen for Yorkshire County Cricket Club between 1923 and 1926.

Born in Elloughton-cum-Brough, Yorkshire, England, Stephenson was a right hand batsman, who scored 949 runs in his thirty five first-class matches, with a best of 72 against H. D. G. Leveson-Gower's XI. He took twenty one catches in the field. He took eleven wickets with his right arm medium pace, with a best of 3 for 44 against Gloucestershire, at an average of 47.36.

Stephenson died in October 1975 in Horsham, Sussex, England. His brother, Robert Stephenson, played three first-class matches for the Royal Navy.
