= Wex (disambiguation) =

Wex is a collaboratively-edited legal dictionary and encyclopedia.

Wex or WEX may also refer to:

- WEX Inc., a provider of payment processing and information management services
- County Wexford, the Chapman code WEX
- Wechselapparat, a World War I German flamethrower

== People with the surname ==
- Michael Wex, Canadian author
- Bernard Wex, English civil engineer
- Helga Wex (1924–1986), German politician
- Marianne Wex, German feminist artist, author, and self-healer
