= Castle House, Elloughton =

House in the East Riding of Yorkshire, England

Coordinates: 53°44′15″N 0°34′27″W

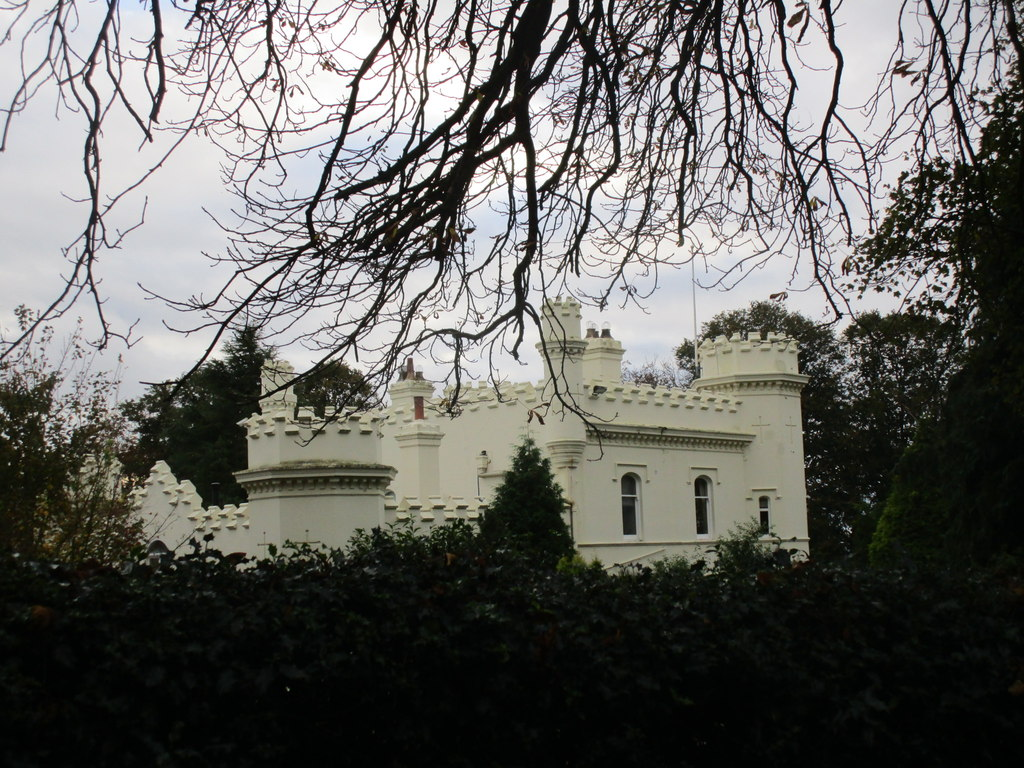
The building, in 2014

Castle House is a historic building in Elloughton, a village in the East Riding of Yorkshire, in England.

The house lies on Sands Lane, and was built in 1886 for W. D. Lyon. It may have been designed by Smith & Brodrick and is in the Gothick style. Nikolaus Pevsner describes it as "the sort of thing one finds at the seaside". The building was grade II listed in 1988. It suffered a serious fire in 2021.

The house is broadly in the form of a castle. It is stuccoed, and has a lead roof, embattled parapets, and a square plan. The main front has two storeys flanked by octagonal corner towers, and the rear has a single storey flanked by smaller octagonal towers. On the main front is a doorway with a segmental head, a moulded surround, decorated spandrels and a hood mould. The windows are a mix of lancets and segmental-arched sashes. Inside, the original staircase in the Tudor style survives, as do some original ceilings and doorframes.

== See also ==
- Listed buildings in Elloughton-cum-Brough
