= Listed buildings in North Cave =

North Cave is a civil parish in the county of the East Riding of Yorkshire, England. It contains 27 listed buildings that are recorded in the National Heritage List for England. Of these, one is listed at Grade I, the highest of the three grades, two are at Grade II*, the middle grade, and the others are at Grade II, the lowest grade. The parish contains the village of North Cave and the hamlet of Everthorpe, and the surrounding countryside. Most of the listed buildings are houses and associated structures, farmhouses and farm buildings, and the others include a church, a former mill, a mounting block and milepost, and a war memorial.

== Key ==
Grade	Criteria
I	Buildings of exceptional interest, sometimes considered to be internationally important
II*	Particularly important buildings of more than special interest
II	Buildings of national importance and special interest

== Buildings ==
Name and location	Photograph	Date	Notes	Grade
All Saints' Church; 53.78317°N 0.64040°W		Late 12th century	The church has been altered and extended through the centuries, including a restoration in 1892. It is built in limestone with a Welsh slate roof, and consists of a nave with a clerestory, north and south aisles, a south porch, north and south transept chapels, a chancel, and a west tower. The tower has two stages, and the lower part is Norman. It has a two-light west window with Y-tracery, a lancet window above, a diagonal buttress on the left, and a lean-to boiler house. Above are clock faces, a coved band, three-light bell openings, a coved band with gargoyles, and an embattled parapet with eight crocketed pinnacles. The nave and aisles also have embattled parapets.	I
Manor Farmhouse East; 53.78345°N 0.63869°W		Late 17th century	The farmhouse is in stone, and has a pantile roof with tumbled-in brick to the left gable end. There are two storeys and six bays, the right bay recessed. On the front are two doorways and sash windows, some horizontally sliding.	II
Hotham Hall; 53.79198°N 0.64058°W		c. 1720	A country house in limestone with roofs of Westmorland and Welsh slate. It consists of a main block with a pavilion to the left and two later ranges to the right. The main block has two storeys and attics, and five bays. It is on a plinth, and has rusticated quoins, sill bands, a modillion cornice, and a hipped roof. The central doorway has a moulded surround, a triple keystone, and a pediment on consoles. The windows are sashes with triple keystones, and above are gabled roof dormers. On the garden front is a semicircular bay window. The house is linked to the pavilion by a two-storey bay, and has two storeys and an attic and three bays, and a gable end at the front. The ranges on the left have two storeys, the first has five bays, the second has six bays, and both have hipped roofs.	II*
Gates and gates piers, stable yard, Hotham Hall; 53.79231°N 0.64106°W	—	Early 18th century	The gate piers flanking the entrance to the stable yard are in rusticated stone, they have a cruciform plan, and are about 4 metres (13 ft) in height. Each pier has an entablature, panelled pilasters, and a moulded cornice surmounted by an urn. The gates are in wrought iron and above is an elaborate overthrow.	II
3 Westgate and outbuildings 53.78027°N 0.64554°W	—	Mid-18th century	The house and outbuildings are in colourwashed stone, with stepped eaves and pantile roofs with coped gables. The house has two storeys and three bays. The doorway has a rectangular fanlight and a canopy. To its left is a narrow window, there are two dummy windows on the upper floor, and the other windows are sashes. To the left are two outbuildings, there is one outbuilding to the right, and all have a single storey.	II
5 Westgate; 53.78014°N 0.64596°W		Mid-18th century	A house and outhouse in stone with a pantile roof. The house has a stepped eaves course, a hipped roof, two storeys and three bays. The doorway has pilasters and a rectangular fanlight, above it is a dummy window, and the other windows are sashes; all the windows with channelled wedge lintels and fluted keystones. The outbuilding to the left has a single storey, a single bay, and a coped parapet, and it contains a shopfront with a canopy.	II
24 and 26 Westgate; 53.77990°N 0.64727°W	—	Mid-18th century	A house, later two shops, in rendered stone and brick, with a hipped pantile roof. There are two storeys and two bays. On the ground floor are two 20th-century shopfronts, and the upper floor contains casement windows.	II
86 Westgate; 53.77928°N 0.65233°W	—	Mid-18th century	The house is in stone, with a dentilled eaves course, and a French tile roof with tumbled and raised gable ends. There are two storeys and three bays. The central doorway has a canopy on decorative consoles, and the windows are sashes under flat aches.	II
Glebe House; 53.78025°N 0.64619°W	—	Mid-18th century	The house is in colourwashed brick on a stone plinth, with a sill band, an eaves gutter on square brackets, and a pantile roof with tumbled-in brick to the raised gables and shaped kneelers. There are two storeys and an attic, five bays, and two later rear cross-wings. The central doorway has a Doric doorcase with pilasters, a fluted entablature and a pediment and a door with a rectangular fanlight. The windows are sashes under flat brick arches, and above are two roof dormers containing casements.	II
Dovecote, Manor Farm East; 53.78328°N 0.63846°W		Mid-18th century	The dovecote is in stone on a plinth, with a floor band, a moulded cornice, and a hipped Westmorland slate roof. There is an octagonal plan and two storeys. Steps lead up to the doorway, on the upper floor is a fixed window, and on the roof is a cupola with pigeon openings, an ogee roof, and a weathervane with a tiger.	II
Granary, stables and barn, Manor Farm East; 53.78338°N 0.63869°W	—	Mid-18th century	The farm buildings are in limestone and brick, with pantile roofs and two storeys, and they from an L-shaped plan. The granary forms the short side, it has three bays, and contains doorways, a stable door, a datestone, and a pitching door. On the long side, the stables have a round arch in gauged brick with a keystone and imposts, a central doorway and windows. The barn has three bays, and contains a door and vents.	II
Paper Mill House; 53.78345°N 0.64383°W		Mid-18th century	A mill, later a house, in stone with later brick, decorative metal tie-plates, pantile roofs and two storeys. On the left is the former miller's house, with four bays, a doorway with pilasters and a fanlight. The windows are horizontally sliding sashes, most under segmental brick arches. The former mill also has four bays, on the ground floor are three openings, two blocked, and the upper floor has sash windows, one horizontally sliding.	II
Pigeoncote, The Croft; 53.77970°N 0.64613°W	—	18th century	The pigeoncote is in stone with a pyramidal pantile roof. There is a square plan, and a lean-to on the left. It contains a doorway, a fixed window at eaves level, and on the roof is a hexagonal cupola with entrance holes. Inside, there are nesting boxes on each wall.	II
5 Finkle Street; 53.77940°N 0.64694°W		Mid to late 18th century	The house is in limestone, the extension is in stone and brick, and there is a pantile roof with brick tumbling to the raised gable ends. The house has two storeys and four bays, and a lower extension on the left. On the front are two doorways and sash windows, and on the gable end the windows are horizontally sliding.	II
51 Westgate; 53.77931°N 0.65044°W	—	Mid to late 18th century	The house is in stone, and has a French tile roof with stone gable coping and shaped kneelers. There are two storeys and three bays. The central doorway has pilasters and a rectangular fanlight, and the windows are sashes under rubbed brick flat arches.	II
Stable block, Hotham Hall; 53.79226°N 0.64149°W		1769	The stable block is in stone with a Westmorland slate roof. There is a U-shaped plan with a rear extension. The main block has two storeys and seven bays, at the rear is a five-bay extension, and it is flanked by two-storey five-bay wings. The middle bay of the main range projects and contains a two-story carriage arch with imposts and a keystone. Above is a broad pediment containing a clock face and a re-set datestone, and on the roof is an open cupola with an ogee lead roof and a weathervane with the date. The outer bays contain elliptical-arched carriage openings, doorways, and sash windows. On each gable end is a Venetian window and a Diocletian window above.	II*
Milestone Farmhouse; 53.77949°N 0.65021°W	—	Late 18th century	The house, with an earlier rear wing and a later 19th-century extension, is in limestone, and has a pantile roof with gable coping and shaped kneelers. The main block has a plinth, two storeys and three bays. The central doorway has a fanlight and a pediment. The rear cross-wing has a single storey, and the extension has two storeys, a single bay and a hipped roof. The windows are sashes under stuccoed channelled wedge lintels.	II
The White House; 53.77592°N 0.62172°W		Late 18th century	The house is in whitewashed stone with an addition in brick, and a French tile roof with brick tumbling to the raised gable ends. There are two storeys and two bays, and a rear outshut. On the front is a doorway, and the windows are sashes.	II
Westfield House; 53.78177°N 0.64494°W	—	Late 18th to early 19th century	The house is in brick, with stone at the rear, a dentilled eaves course, and a pantile roof with stone coped gables and shaped kneelers. There are two storeys and three bays. The central doorway has pilasters, a fanlight, and a pediment, and the windows are sashes, those on the ground floor with flat brick arches.	II
The Vicarage; 53.78206°N 0.64015°W	—	1821	The vicarage, which was extended in 1841, is in yellow brick, with stone dressings, a sill band, and a hipped Westmorland slate roof. There are two storeys and four bays. The entrance in the left return is through a timber conservatory, and the windows are sashes under wedge lintels, those on the ground floor taller.	II
16 Church Street; 53.78212°N 0.64392°W		Early 19th century	The house is in brick, with lions' heads to the guttering, and an M-shaped pantile roof with raised gable ends and tumbled-in brick. There are two storeys, three bays, a parallel rear range, and a single-storey bay to the right of the rear wing. The central doorway has pilasters and a rectangular fanlight. The windows are sashes, those on the ground floor under segmental heads.	II
77 Westgate and wall 53.77891°N 0.65280°W	—	Early 19th century	The house is in rendered stone and brick on a plinth, with quoins, a broad stone eaves band, and a hipped tile roof. There are two storeys, a square plan, and three bays. The doorway has a Tuscan doorcase, and a doorway with a divided fanlight. The windows are sashes with decorative stone surrounds. The garden wall is in brick with flat buttresses and coping. It is ramped to square end gate piers, one in stone, one in brick, and each with a moulded capital and a ball finial. A further section to the right has a blind doorway and a window under segmental arches.	II
Castle Farmhouse; 53.78833°N 0.62531°W		Early 19th century	The house is in limestone, with quoins, a sill band, and Welsh slate roofs. The main range has a half-hipped roof, two storeys and three bays, the middle bay canted with a hipped roof and a central depression. The ground floor forms a porch with three round arches and a doorway with a fanlight, above which is a band. The windows are sashes under flat brick arches. To the left is a service wing with a single storey and attics, and three bays. It contains tripartite sash windows, and above are two gabled roof dormers.	II
Nordham House; 53.78387°N 0.64390°W	—	Early 19th century	The house is in yellow brick with a hipped Westmorland slate roof. There are two storeys and three bays. The central doorway has a divided fanlight, and the windows are sashes under wedge lintels.	II
Westgate House; 53.78035°N 0.64596°W		Early 19th century	The house is in brick, and has an M-shaped pantile roof with gable coping and shaped kneelers. There are two storeys, two parallel ranges, and four bays. In the right bay is a former carriage arch with double imposts and a keystone. The doorway has a Tuscan doorcase, and a fanlight with decorative tracery. Under the arch is a casement window, and the other windows and sashes under flat rubbed brick arches. Above are two roof dormers with horizontally sliding sashes.	II
Mounting block and milepost 53.77948°N 0.65013°W		19th century	On the north side of Westgate (B1230 road) is a two-step mounting block in stone, about 0.75 metres (2 ft 6 in) in height. Bolted on the upper step is a round-headed metal plaque inscribed with the distances to Howden and Hull.	II
War memorial 53.78053°N 0.64465°W		1921	The war memorial, which stands near a road junction, is in Portland stone, and consists of a floriated Latin cross incorporating the white rose of York. The cross is on a tapering octagonal shaft with an embattled top, on a square plinth, on a three-tiered octagonal base. On the plinth is decorative carving and an inscription. On the base is an inscription and the names of those lost in the two World Wars and in a later conflict.	II
