= All Saints' Church, Brough =

Church in Brough, East Riding of Yorkshire, England

Coordinates: 53°43′47″N 0°34′34″W

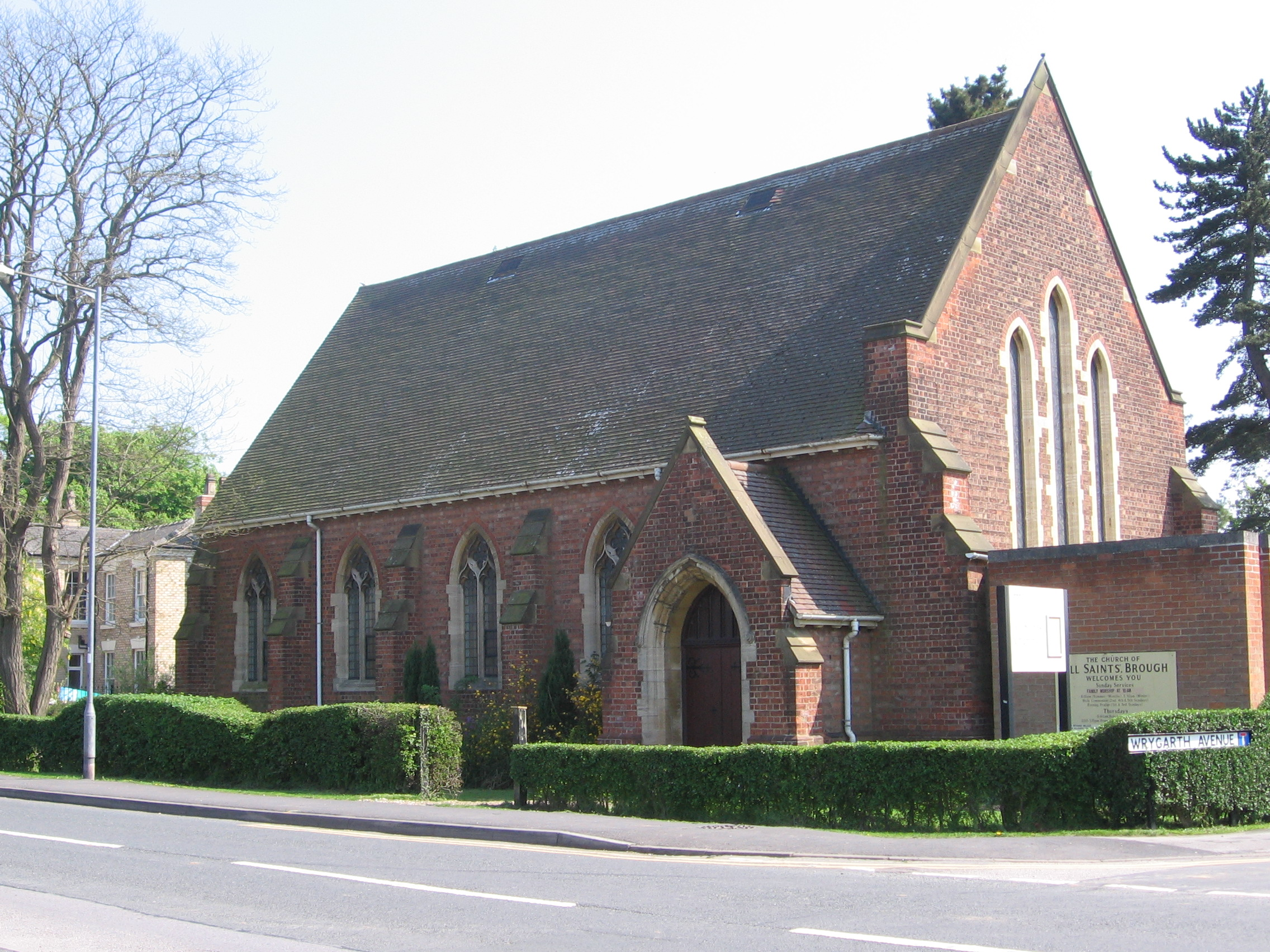
The church, in 2008

All Saints' Church is the parish church of Brough, East Riding of Yorkshire, a town in England.

Brough was long in the parish of St Mary's Church, Elloughton. A church was built in the town in 1913, to a Gothic revival design by William Snowball Walker. In 1965, a porch and vestries were added at the west end, and the interior was rearranged. In 2020, a narthex was created from the west end of the nave, to a design by Ferrey and Mennim.

The church is built of red brick and has a tiled roof. It has a polygonal apse. The west window has glass installed in 1932, designed by Percy Bacon.
