= Robert Stephenson (cricketer) =

English cricketer & Royal Navy officer (1906–1942)

Personal information
- Full name: Robert Hearfield Stephenson
- Born: 3 June 1906; Brough, Yorkshire, England
- Died: 9 November 1942 (aged 36); HMS Cromer, Mediterranean Sea, off Mersa Matruh, British-occupied Egypt
- Batting: Right-handed
- Relatives: John Stephenson (brother)

Career statistics
Competition	First-class
Matches	3
Runs scored	122
Batting average	20.33
100s/50s	–/1
Top score	75
Catches/stumpings	3/–
- Source: Cricinfo, 12 December 2019

Robert Hearfield Stephenson DSO (3 June 1906 – 9 November 1942) was an English first-class cricketer and Royal Navy officer.

The son of William Hugh Stephenson and his wife, Ethel, he was born in June 1906 at Brough, Yorkshire. After leaving school, Stephenson opted to join the Royal Navy, being commissioned as an acting sub-lieutenant in September 1926, with promotion to sub-lieutenant following in May 1927. He made his debut in first-class cricket for the Royal Navy against the Royal Air Force at The Oval in 1927. He made two further first-class appearances for the navy in 1928, playing against the British Army cricket team and the Royal Air Force. He scored 122 runs in his three matches, including making 75 on debut.

Stephenson was promoted to the rank of lieutenant commander in May 1937, before later serving in the Second World War. During the war he was promoted to the rank of commander in June 1941, in addition to receiving the Distinguished Service Order in August 1942 for his actions while commanding HMS Cromer during the Battle of Madagascar. Stephenson was killed aboard HMS Cromer when the ship hit a mine off the coast of the Egyptian port of Mersa Matruh on 9 November 1942. His body was never recovered. His brother, John, also played first-class cricket.
