= HM Prison Wolds =

Prison in the East Riding of Yorkshire, England

Coordinates: 53.7695°N 0.6411°W

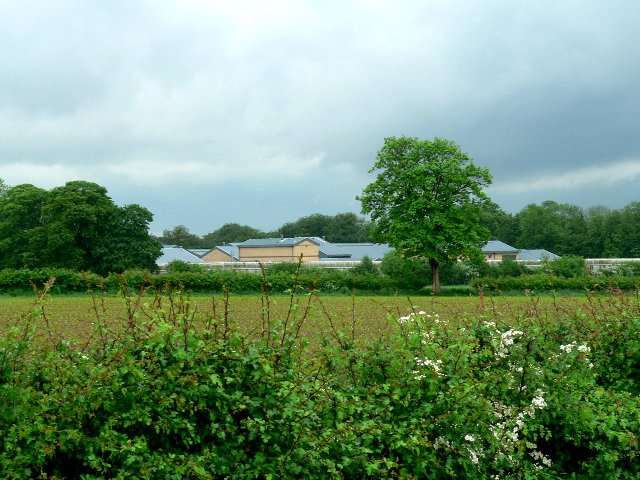
- Interactive map of HM Prison Wolds
- Location: Everthorpe, East Riding of Yorkshire
- Status: Operational
- Security class: Adult Male/Category C
- Capacity: 395 (September 2008)
- Opened: 1992
- Managed by: HM Prison Services
- Governor: Cathy James

HM Prison Wolds was a Category C men's prison, located south-west of Everthorpe, (near Brough) in the East Riding of Yorkshire, England. The prison was operated by G4S, and was situated next to HMP Everthorpe. The two neighbouring prisons were merged in 2014, and renamed HM Prison Humber.

== History ==
In 1991, G4S won the first prison management contract to be operated by the private sector in the United Kingdom, and all of Europe. HMP Wolds opened in April 1992 as a remand prison and in 1993 was re-rolled to a local Category B prison holding sentenced prisoners. In 2001, HMP Wolds was subject to a competitive re-bid. G4S was the successful bidder for the contract to run HMP Wolds, however the jail was re-rolled again to a Category C training prison.

On 13 July 2011, it was announced that HMP Wolds would be put out to tender in the autumn, accepting bids from private companies and HM Prison Service for the management of the establishment after the current contract with G4S expires. In November 2012 it was announced that the G4S contract would be allowed to expire in July 2013 and the prison would then revert to the public sector.

== The prison ==
Wolds was a Category C prison for adult males (including prisoners serving second stage life sentences). Accommodation at the prison consisted of six units of single and double cells (some single cells have been doubled up to accommodate extra prisoners).

The regime at the prison included education (full-time, evening classes and residential college), workshops, gardens and a works department. Other facilities at the prison included a gym and multi-faith chaplaincy.
