= All Saints' Church, North Cave =

Church in North Cave, East Riding of Yorkshire, England

Coordinates: 53°46′59″N 0°38′26″W

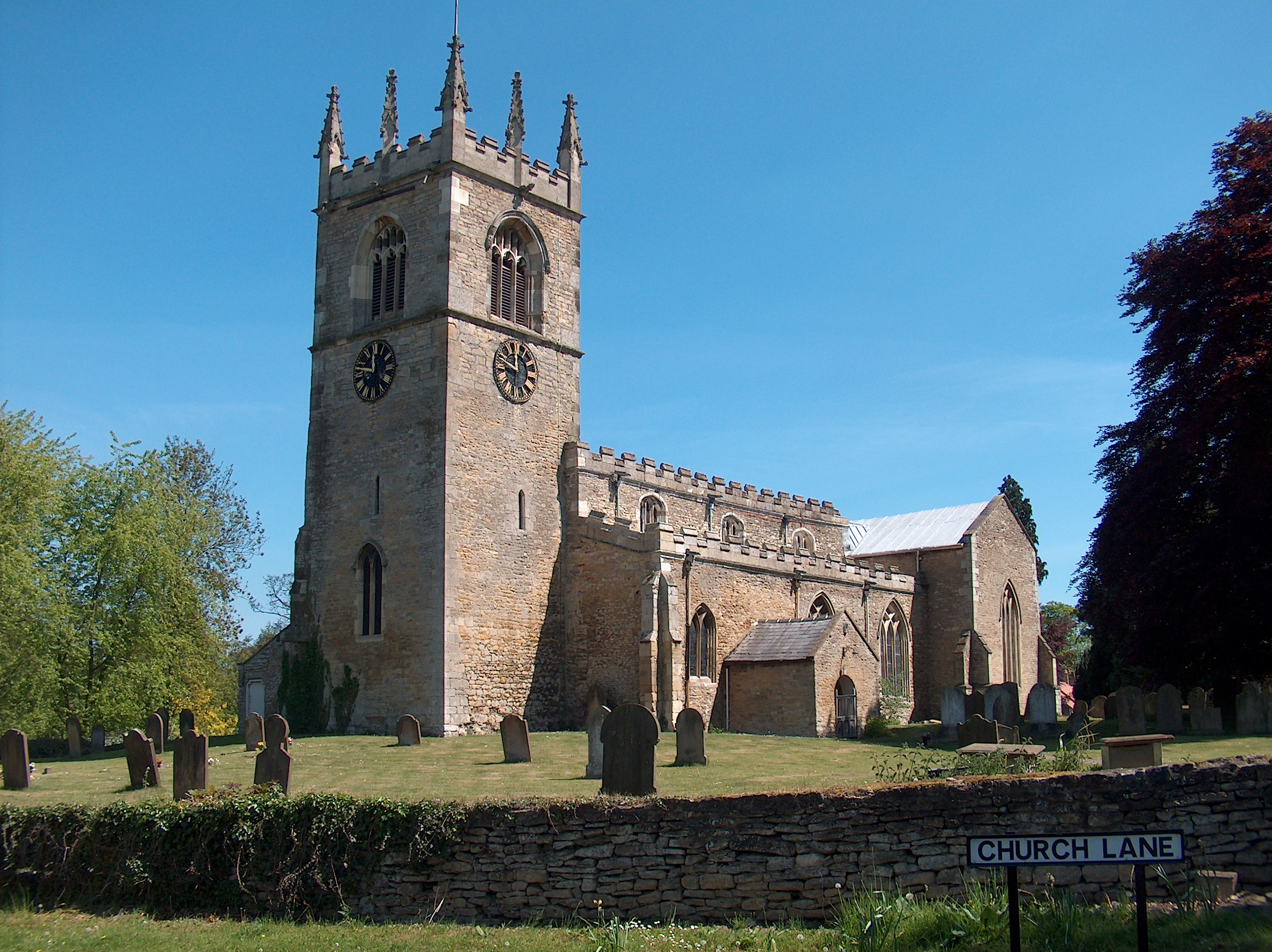
The church, in 2010

All Saints' Church is the parish church of North Cave, a village in the East Riding of Yorkshire, in England.

The church was built in the late 12th century, from which period the lower part of the tower survives. The nave and chancel were constructed late in the 13th century, followed in the 15th century by the clerestory and the upper part of the tower. A porch was added in 1753, and the church was restored in 1892. The building was grade I listed in 1966.

The chancel

The church is built of limestone with a Welsh slate roof, and consists of a nave with a clerestory, north and south aisles, a south porch, north and south transept chapels, a chancel, and a west tower. The tower has two stages, and the lower part is Norman. It has a two-light west window with Y-tracery, a lancet window above, a diagonal buttress on the left, and a lean-to boiler house. Above are clock faces, a coved band, three-light bell openings, a coved band with gargoyles, and an embattled parapet with eight crocketed pinnacles. The nave and aisles also have embattled parapets. Inside, there are various monuments, including recumbent figures of a knight and a lady in recesses on opposite sides of the chancel.

== See also ==
- Grade I listed buildings in the East Riding of Yorkshire
- Listed buildings in North Cave
