= HM Prison Everthorpe =

Former prison in the East Riding of Yorkshire, England

Coordinates: 53.7682°N 0.6351°W

HMP Everthorpe
- Interactive map of HMP Everthorpe
- Location: Everthorpe, East Riding of Yorkshire
- Security class: Adult Male/Category C
- Population: 689 (December 2007)
- Opened: 1958
- Managed by: HM Prison Services
- Governor: Marcella Goligher
- Website: Everthorpe at justice.gov.uk

HM Prison Everthorpe was a Category C men's prison, located to the south-west of Everthorpe, (near Brough) in the East Riding of Yorkshire, England. The prison was operated by Her Majesty's Prison Service, and was situated next to HMP Wolds.

In 2014, HM Prison Everthorpe was merged with HM Prison Wolds, and renamed HM Prison Humber.

== History ==
Originally a borstal at its creation in 1958 to replace Dartmoor Prison, in 1991 Everthorpe Prison was converted to house male convicts.

During the Christmas and New Year period of 1995/1996, Everthorpe experienced some prisoner unrest that resulted in a large, two-day prison riot. According to investigators, the unrest was caused by official steps to eliminate drug use by inmates and also by shortages of tobacco and phonecards, which had run out over the holiday period. The prison was criticised for its lack of security, bad management and the deployment of inexperienced staff during the riot.

An inspection report from Her Majesty's Chief Inspector of Prisons in July 2004 praised Everthorpe Prison for its education and training programmes, but warned that Everthorpe needed to ensure that all inmates at the prison benefitted from these programmes.

The prison was substantially expanded in 2005. In an inspection report a year later, Everthorpe was criticised by the Chief Inspector of Prisons because places on resettlement and offending behaviour programmes had "failed to keep pace" with the increased number of prisoners held at the prison. The report also highlighted problems with bullying amongst inmates.

In January 2008 it emerged that inmates at Everthorpe had been regularly smuggling drugs, mobile phones and women's clothing into the prison. A ladder had been used by an accomplice on the outside to scale the 20-foot perimeter wall of the prison to supply these items, with the racket reportedly continuing for at least six months.

== The prison ==
Everthorpe was a Category C training prison with a strong emphasis of on education and training. Education at Everthorpe was provided by The Manchester College and East Riding College with courses including Literacy, Numeracy, Art and Design, Information Technology, Business, wall and floor tiling, Painting and Decorating, Bricklaying, Industrial cleaning, and Computer Aided Design. The PE department at the prison also ran various Physical Education courses as well as recreational gym.

It was announced in June 2013 that HM Prisons Everthorpe and Wolds would merge into one larger prison under a new name: HM Prison Humber.
