= North Cave Wetlands =

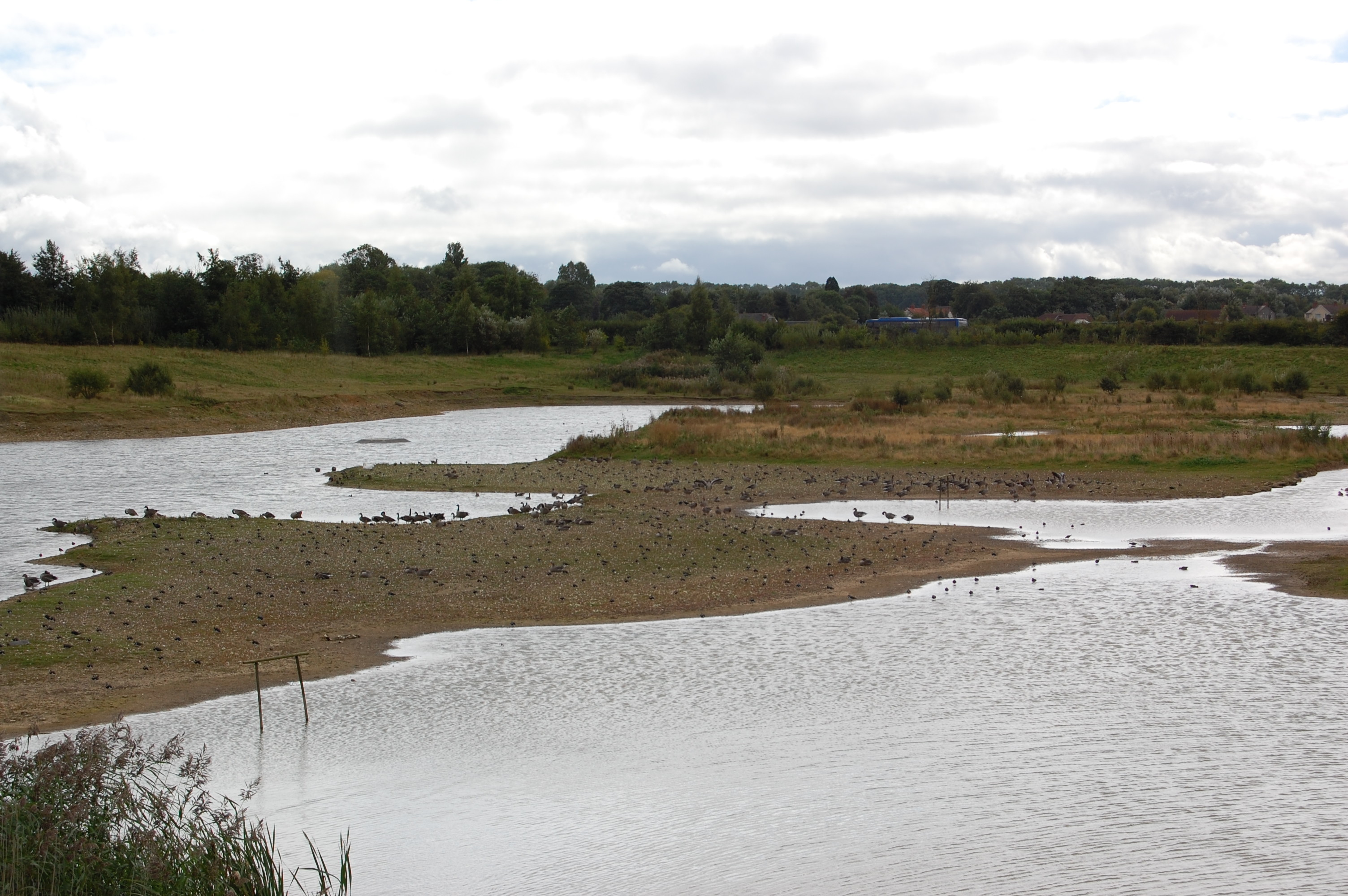
- View south from Turret Hide
- Interactive map of North Cave Wetlands
- Location: North Cave, East Riding of Yorkshire, England
- Coordinates: 53.786995°N 0.65889°W
- Operator: Yorkshire Wildlife Trust
- Website: www.ywt.org.uk/north_cave_wetlands.php

North Cave Wetlands is a nature reserve at North Cave, East Riding of Yorkshire, England, managed by the Yorkshire Wildlife Trust.

The reserve based at Dryham Lane is 40 hectares (99 acres) in size and comprises six lakes, restored from a former sand and gravel quarry. There are five bird hides. Expansion is eventually planned, onto additional pits, which are currently still being quarried.
