= The Buccaneer, Brough =

Pub in the East Riding of Yorkshire, England

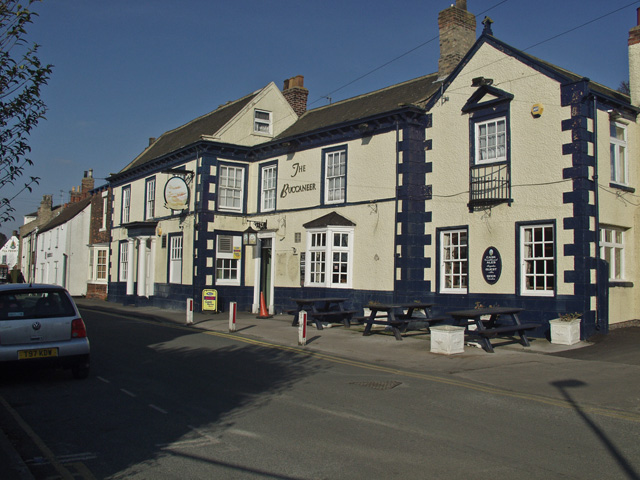
The pub, in 2008

The Buccaneer is a historic pub in Brough, East Riding of Yorkshire, a town in England.

The pub lies on Station Road and was built in the mid or late 18th century. It was extended to the right in the early 19th century, and further to the right late in the century. It was originally named "The Tavern", then when Brough railway station opened nearby in 1840, it was renamed the "Railway Tavern". In 1962, it was renamed "The Buccaneer", in reference to the Blackburn Buccaneer plane, which was built nearby. It was grade II listed in 1988. In 2020, the pub was owned by Star Pubs & Bars when it closed due to reports of anti-social behaviour. It was refurbished at a cost of £226,000, and reopened in 2022.

The pub is roughcast and colourwashed, on a plinth, with stone dressings, rusticated quoins, sill bands, modillion eaves cornices, and slate roofs with coped gables on brick kneelers. The original block has two storeys and three bays. In the centre is a porch with unfluted Doric columns, and a doorway with a fanlight in panelled reveals and soffit. The windows are sashes in architraves. The first extension contains a doorway with a fluted surround and paterae, and a canted bay window. The further extension is gabled with a poppyhead finial, and the upper floor window has a wrought iron balcony and a pediment.

== See also ==
- Listed buildings in Elloughton-cum-Brough
