= Hotham Hall =

House in North Cave, East Riding of Yorkshire, England

Coordinates: 53.7920°N 0.6407°W

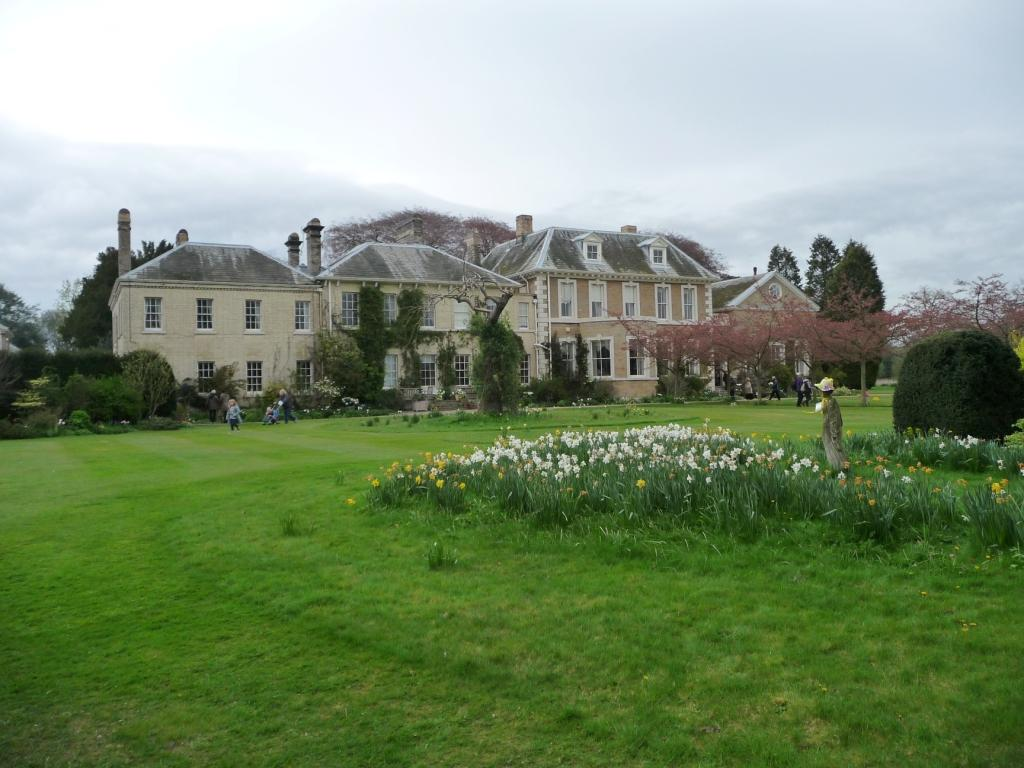
The building, in 2014

Hotham Hall is a historic building in North Cave, a village in the East Riding of Yorkshire, in England.

The house was built around 1720 for William Burton. A pavilion was added in 1772, its design possibly by Thomas Atkinson. In 1773, the Burton family purchased the neighbouring North Cave Manor House, incorporating its grounds into their parkland. Two ranges were added to the house in 1871, designed by William Moseley. The house was grade II* listed in 1966. The house remained with relatives of the Burton family until 1984. In 2020, it was purchased by David and Linda Kilburn, who lived in the building while converting it into an events venue.

== Architecture ==
=== House ===
The house is built of limestone with roofs of Westmorland and Welsh slate. It consists of a main block with a pavilion to the left and two later ranges to the right. The main block has two storeys and attics, and five bays. It is on a plinth, and has rusticated quoins, sill bands, a modillion cornice, and a hipped roof. The central doorway has a moulded surround, a triple keystone, and a pediment on consoles. The windows are sashes with triple keystones, and above are gabled roof dormers. On the garden front is a semicircular bay window. The house is linked to the pavilion by a two-storey bay, and has two storeys and an attic and three bays, and a gable end at the front. The ranges on the left have two storeys, the first has five bays, the second has six bays, and both have hipped roofs.

== Stable block ==
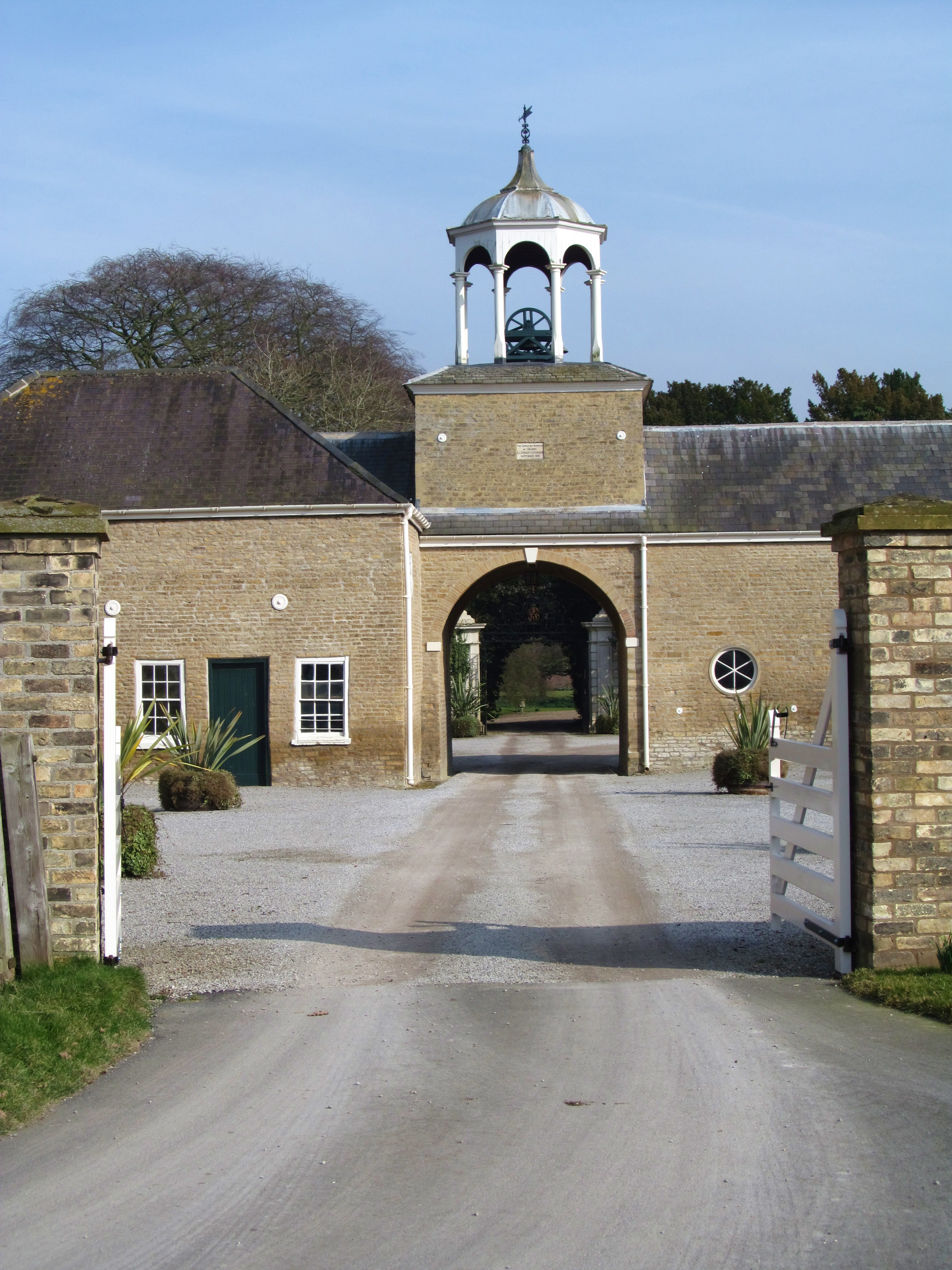
The stable block

The stable block was completed in 1769 and is also grade II* listed. It is built of stone with a Westmorland slate roof. There is a U-shaped plan with a 20th-century rear extension used as garaging. The main block has two storeys and seven bays, at the rear is a five-bay extension, and it is flanked by two-storey five-bay wings. The middle bay of the main range projects and contains a two-story carriage arch with imposts and a keystone. Above is a broad pediment containing a clock face and a datestone reading "GMM 1683", relocated from the demolished North Cave Manor House. On the roof is an open cupola with an ogee lead roof and a weathervane with the date. The outer bays contain elliptical-arched carriage openings, doorways, and sash windows. On each gable end is a Venetian window and a Diocletian window above.

The piers flanking the entrance to the stable yard are in rusticated stone, they have a cruciform plan, and are about 4 metres (13 ft) in height. Each pier has an entablature, panelled pilasters, and a moulded cornice surmounted by an urn. The gates are in wrought iron and above is an elaborate overthrow. The gates and gate piers are collectively grade II listed.

== See also ==
- Grade II* listed buildings in the East Riding of Yorkshire
- Listed buildings in North Cave
