= Everthorpe =

Hamlet in the East Riding of Yorkshire, England

Coordinates: 53.775533°N 0.624051°W

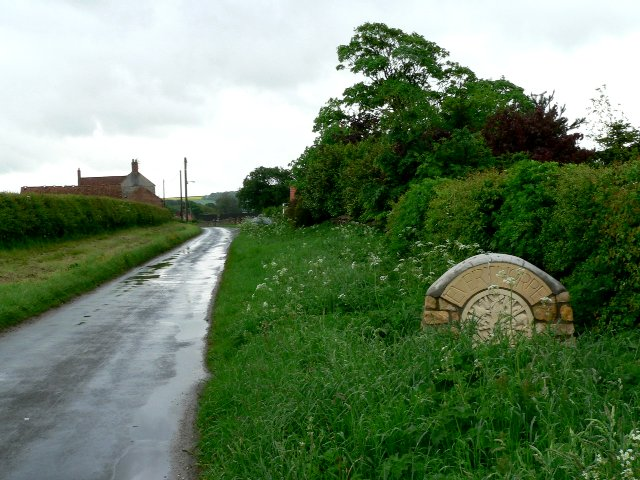
- Low Road, Everthorpe

- Location within the East Riding of Yorkshire
- OS grid reference: SE 907 319
  - London: 160 mi (260 km) S
- Civil parish: North Cave
- Unitary authority: East Riding of Yorkshire
- Ceremonial county: East Riding of Yorkshire
- Region: Yorkshire and the Humber
- Country: England
- Sovereign state: United Kingdom
- Post town: BROUGH
- Postcode district: HU15
- Dialling code: 01430
- Police: Humberside
- Fire: Humberside
- Ambulance: Yorkshire
- UK Parliament: Goole and Pocklington

Everthorpe is a hamlet in the East Riding of Yorkshire, England. It is situated approximately 11 miles (18 km) west of Hull city centre and 10 miles (16 km) east of the market town of Howden, midway between North Cave and South Cave. It lies 1 mile (1.6 km) north of the A63 road and 1 mile west of the A1034 road. Everthorpe forms part of the civil parish of North Cave.

In 1823, Everthorpe was in the parish of North Cave and in the wapentake of Harthill. Population was 177, which included Drewton, a hamlet less than 1 mile to the north-east. Occupations included three farmers, a corn miller, and the landlord of Duke of York pub.

The area was home to two prisons: HM Prison Everthorpe and HM Prison Wolds. In 2014, they merged into HM Prison Humber.

The name Everthorpe derives from the Old English uferra meaning 'higher' and the Old Norse þorp meaning 'secondary settlement'.
