= Listed buildings in Elloughton-cum-Brough =

Elloughton-cum-Brough is a civil parish in the county of the East Riding of Yorkshire, England. It contains twelve listed buildings that are recorded in the National Heritage List for England. Of these, one is listed at Grade II*, the middle of the three grades, and the others are at Grade II, the lowest grade. The parish contains the town of Brough, the village of Elloughton and the surrounding area. The listed buildings include houses and associated structures, a church and a cross base in the churchyard, a farmhouse, a public house, a war memorial and a telephone kiosk.

== Key ==
Grade	Criteria
II*	Particularly important buildings of more than special interest
II	Buildings of national importance and special interest

== Buildings ==
Name and location	Photograph	Date	Notes	Grade
St Mary's Church; 53.74205°N 0.56973°W		15th century	The oldest part of the church is the tower, with the rest largely rebuilt in 1844–45 by J. L. Pearson, re-using some older material. The tower is in stone, the rest of the church in limestone with freestone dressings and slate roofs. The church consists of a nave, a south porch, north and south transepts, a chancel and a west tower. The tower has two stages, a plinth, diagonal buttresses, slit windows, a chamfered floor band, two-light pointed bell openings with Y-tracery, an eaves string course, and an embattled parapet with crocketed corner pinnacles. The south doorway dates from the 13th century, it has a pointed head and three moulded orders, and a hood mould.	II*
Cross base, St Mary's Church; 53.74195°N 0.57001°W	—	Late medieval	The cross base is in the churchyard to the southwest of the church. It is in white limestone, and consists of a square plinth, with spurs carrying a chamfered cross base, with a socket for the shaft.	II
Church Farmhouse; 53.74174°N 0.56964°W	—	18th century	The farmhouse, which incorporates earlier features, is in limestone, with brick dressings, and a pantile roof with a raised coped gable on the left and plain close verges on the right. There are two storeys and five bays. The doorway has a timber architrave, and the windows are sashes. Inside, there is a large inglenook fireplace with a cambered timber bressumer.	II
The Buccaneer Public House; 53.72825°N 0.58049°W		Mid to late 18th century	The public house was twice extended to the right in the 19th century. It is roughcast and colourwashed, on a plinth, with stone dressings, rusticated quoins, sill bands, modillion eaves cornices, and slate roofs with coped gables on brick kneelers. The original block has two storeys and three bays. In the centre is a porch with unfluted Doric columns, and a doorway with a fanlight in panelled reveals and soffit. The windows are sashes in architraves. The first extension contains a doorway with a fluted surround and paterae, and a canted bay window. The further extension is gabled with a poppyhead finial, and the upper floor window has a wrought iron balcony and a pediment.	II
35 Church Lane; 53.74179°N 0.56862°W		Late 18th century	The house is in limestone, with a stepped brick eaves cornice, and a pantile roof with tumbled-in brick to the raised gables. There are two storeys and three bays. The central doorway has pilasters and a pediment. The ground floor windows are sashes, on the upper floor they are casements, and all have wedge lintels.	II
4 Main Street and outbuilding 53.73685°N 0.56962°W	—	Late 18th century	The house is rendered, and has a pantile roof with rendered gable copings. There are two storeys and three bays. In the centre is a porch with Doric columns and an entablature, and the doorway has a fanlight. It is flanked by canted bay windows with casements, and on the upper floor are sash windows. The outbuilding attached to the right has one storey and three bays. It contains board doors and a segmental-headed casement window.	II
Elloughton Garth; 53.73944°N 0.56902°W	—	Late 18th century	The house is in limestone, with red brick dressings, a cogged and stepped brick eaves cornice, and a pantile roof with tumbled-in brick to the raised gables on brick kneelers. There are two storeys and five bays, and a rear range. The doorway has pilasters, a fanlight, a pulvinated frieze and a dentilled pediment. The windows are sashes, in the ground floor with gauged brick arches, and on the upper floor with timber lintels. The right return contains casement windows.	II
Outbuilding, Elloughton Garth; 53.73908°N 0.56903°W	—	Late 18th century	The outbuilding to the south of the house is in limestone, with brick dressings, and a pantile roof with a raised coped gable on the right. There are two storeys and a single bay. The right gable has pigeon holes with alighting slabs.	II
Manor House; 53.74165°N 0.56497°W	—	Late 18th or early 19th century	The house is pebbledashed and colourwashed, and has a slate roof with raised coped gables. There are two storeys and four bays. The doorway has pilasters, a fanlight, and panelled reveals and a soffit, and the windows are sashes.	II
Castle House; 53.73761°N 0.57413°W		1886	A house in the form of a castle, it is stuccoed, and has a lead roof, embattled parapets, and a square plan. The main front has two storeys flanked by octagonal corner towers, and the rear has a single storey flanked by smaller octagonal towers. On the main front is a doorway with a segmental head, a moulded surround, decorated spandrels and a hood mould. The windows are a mix of lancets and segmental-arched sashes.	II
Elloughton and Brough War Memorial; 53.72981°N 0.57297°W		c. 1920	The war memorial, standing near a crossroads, is in limestone. It consists of a cross on a tapering octagonal shaft, on a square moulded base with chamfered corners, on three square steps. On the cross is a laurel wreath and a sword in relief, and on the base is an inscription. Behind the cross is a coped limestone wall with angled corners on a chamfered plinth. On the wall are bronze plaques with inscriptions and the names of those lost in the two World Wars.	II
K8 Telephone Kiosk; 53.72978°N 0.57310°W	—	1966	The telephone kiosk is of the K8 type. It was designed by Bruce Martin and is painted cream. The kiosk has a square plan on a concrete base, and is in cast iron with an aluminium door. All sides contain toughened glass, and on top are rectangular framed signage panes and a flat dome.	II
