= Myton Swing Bridge =

Road bridge in Hull, Yorkshire, England

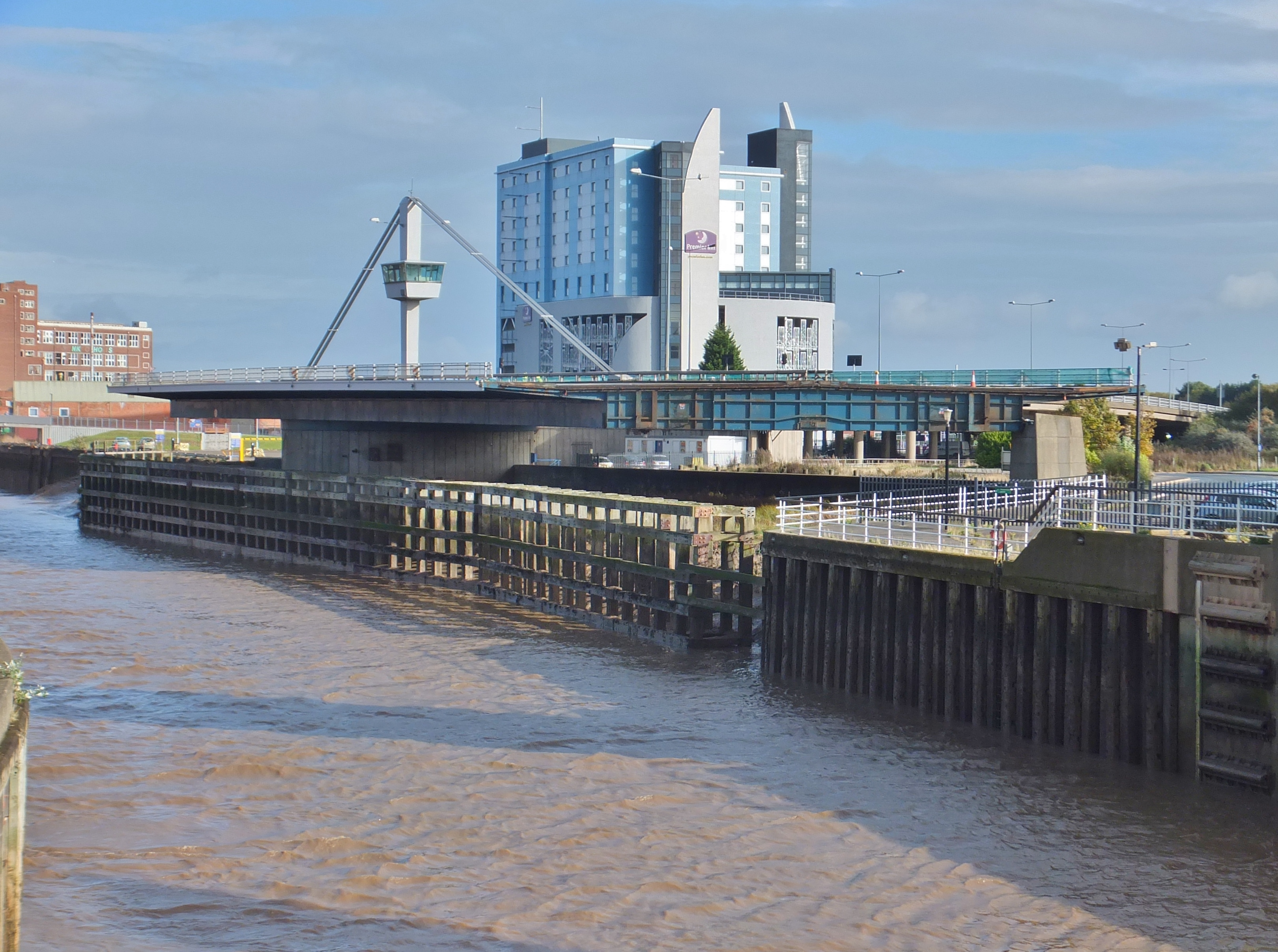
- Myton Swing Bridge in the open position
- Coordinates: 53.7408°N 0.3304°W
- OS grid reference: TA102284
- Carries: A63 road
- Crosses: River Hull
- Locale: Kingston upon Hull
- Owner: National Highways
- Maintained by: Hull City Council
- Next upstream: Scale Lane Footbridge
- Next downstream: River Hull tidal surge barrier

Characteristics
- Design: Box girder
- Material: Steel; Concrete; Asphalt
- Piers in water: 2

History
- Designer: Bernard Wex
- Engineering design by: Cleveland Bridge
- Construction start: 1979
- Construction cost: £8 million (1981)
- Opened: December 1980

Location
- Interactive map of Myton Swing Bridge

Myton Swing Bridge is a road bridge over the River Hull, in the city of Kingston upon Hull, Yorkshire, England. The bridge carries the A63 road through the south of the city connecting the west and east regions of Hull. Designed by the firm of Freeman Fox and Partners, with engineering undertaken by Cleveland Bridge, it was the largest swing bridge in Britain when it was opened in 1980. The bridge was expected to carry 30,000 vehicles a week, but by 2004, it was carrying 40,000 vehicles a day.

== History ==
The bridge, which was opened to traffic in December 1980 is an asymmetric cable-stayed box girder swing bridge, located 350 metres (1,150 ft) north of the mouth of the River Hull into the Humber Estuary, Kingston upon Hull. The bridge was tendered at £5.5 million in 1977, but its eventual cost was £8 million (equivalent to £30,841,000 in 2025) when it was opened to traffic as part of the A63 Garrison Road in 1981. The A63 road connects Hull with the M62 in the west, and the bridge enabled the docks areas of Hull to connect into the dual carriageway network avoiding the city centre. The road the bridge carries was renamed in 2018 to the Roger Millward Way, after a local sporting hero. Initially it was maintained by Humberside County Council, but after its abolition in March 1993, the bridge has been looked after by Hull City Council. Upon approval of the bridge as part of the south orbital road, it was known as south bridge, with the A165 road having North Bridge as its name. However, since the bridges were not adjacent, to avoid confusion to motorists, it was named Myton Bridge after the historic Myton area of the city that it was in.

The bridge, which was designed by Bernard Wex of Freeman Fox and Partners, stretches for 83 metres (272 ft) across the river, and swing section weighs 800 tonnes (880 tons). Over 900 tonnes (990 tons) of steel and more than 630 tonnes (690 tons) of concrete were used in the building of the entire structure which includes piers both in and out of the water, and a resting pier for when the bridge is swung open. Engineering of the structure was undertaken by Cleveland Bridge. A tower with a control cabin, also built of steel, is placed in the centre median of the roadway which traverses the bridge. Initially the bridge was built with three lanes in either direction, and a pedestrian walkway on the outer edges. Currently the bridge only has two lanes in either direction, with the outermost lane on each side being a hatched area for emergency situations. The swing section measures 32 metres (105 ft) wide, by 83 metres (272 ft) long. The bridge is actually two distinct spans of 55 metres (180 ft) on the eastern side of the control tower, and 28 metres (92 ft) west of the tower. Due to this, much of the extra concrete and steel was used on the back of the shorter span to balance out the weight and provide ballast for the swing operation as a kentledge.

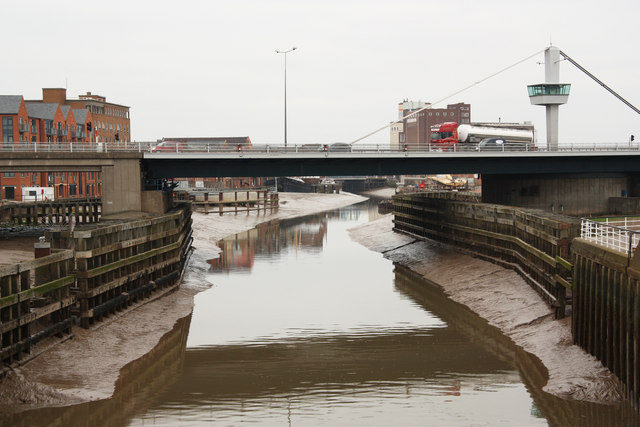
Myton Bridge closed with road traffic upon it. This is looking upstream at low water

In addition to the measures for the bridge, additional works were undertaken in the river, providing piling along the approaches to the bridge not only to prevent damage to ships, but also to prevent shipping hitting the two concrete piers which supported the bridge in the water. The design was envisaged with vessels to a maximum gross weight of 1,500 tonnes (1,700 tons) and no more than 60 metres (200 ft) in length. It also required a headroom of 30 metres (98 ft). Due to these constraints and associated additional city centre infrastructure, it was decided that a swing span would be better than a lifting bridge. A high level bridge was also ruled out due to a road junction within 200 metres (660 ft) of the bridge, and also aesthetic concerns as the bridge was in the old town area of Hull.

Upon opening to traffic in 1980, it was known as the widest and longest swing bridge in Britain. The bridge was swung open at least two times per day (on average 60 times per month). These timings were normally associated with high tide as most vessels were unable to pass underneath the bridge. The mechanism to swing the bridge open takes 150 seconds, creating a clear passage of 98 feet (30 m) for river vessels. Closure takes 30 seconds less than opening. Initial estimates were of 30,000 vehicles using the bridge every week. By 2004, it was carrying about 40,000 vehicles a day, and was required to open to river traffic on average ten times per month. By 2010, it was opening 200–300 times per year (around 16–25 times per month). Hull City Council encouraged businesses to move away from the River Hull, and as a result, since 2011, openings of the bridge have averaged 20–30 times a month, and are coordinated to be when the traffic flow is at a minimum. Access underneath the approach ramps to each bridge provides routes for vehicles and pedestrians; on the west side this is High Street, on the east side, the road provides access to The Deep.

A year after opening, the bridge was given an award in the 1981 Structural Steel Design Awards for its "imaginative Design". Throughout the 1980s, the bridge was known to break down, causing tailbacks on either side of the bridge. New motors, pumps and a drive system were installed in 1990 at a cost of £700,000 (equivalent to £1,731,000 in 2025). The bridge was extensively renovated in the summer of 2023. This involved whole weekend closures with diversions around the city. Whilst these renovations were underway, the repair team needed seven days notice for any vessels which required the bridge to be swung open as this would involve moving plant machinery and enabling the balance to be correct.

== See also ==
- River Ouse swing bridge
