= Elloughton =

Village in the East Riding of Yorkshire, England

Coordinates: 53°44′24″N 0°34′19″W

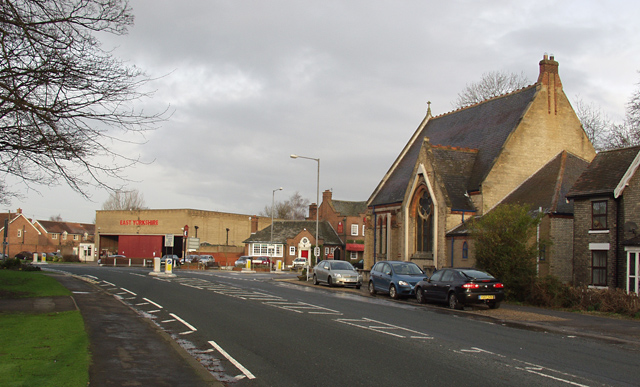
- Welton Low Road, Elloughton

- Location within the East Riding of Yorkshire
- OS grid reference: SE942280
  - London: 155 mi (249 km) S
- Civil parish: Elloughton-cum-Brough
- Unitary authority: East Riding of Yorkshire
- Ceremonial county: East Riding of Yorkshire
- Region: Yorkshire and the Humber
- Country: England
- Sovereign state: United Kingdom
- Post town: BROUGH
- Postcode district: HU15
- Dialling code: 01482
- Police: Humberside
- Fire: Humberside
- Ambulance: Yorkshire
- UK Parliament: Goole and Pocklington

Elloughton is a village in the East Riding of Yorkshire, England. It is situated approximately 12 miles (19 km) to the west of Hull to the south of the A63 road. It lies on the southern end of the Yorkshire Wolds. It is conjoined with Brough that lies to the south-east, with which it forms the civil parish of Elloughton-cum-Brough. Elloughton lies within the Parliamentary constituency of Goole and Pocklington.

The name Elloughton possibly derives from the Old Norse elgr meaning 'heathen temple', or the personal name Helgi, and the Old English dūn meaning 'hill'.

Elloughton Primary School is an integral part of the village.

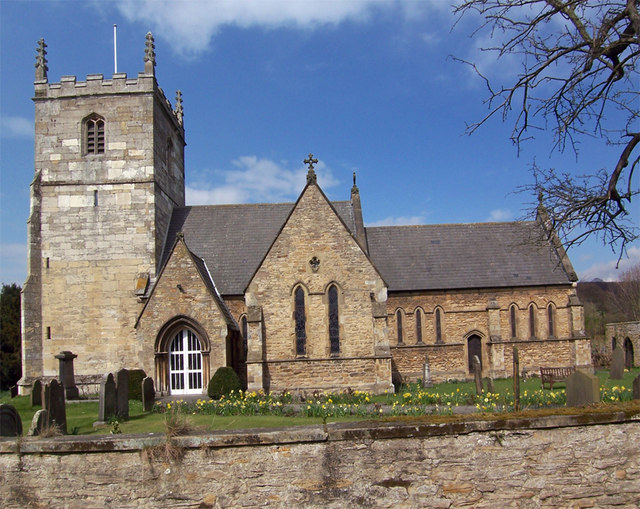
St Marys Church

St Mary's Church, Elloughton was designated a Grade II* listed building in 1968 and is now recorded in the National Heritage List for England, maintained by Historic England.

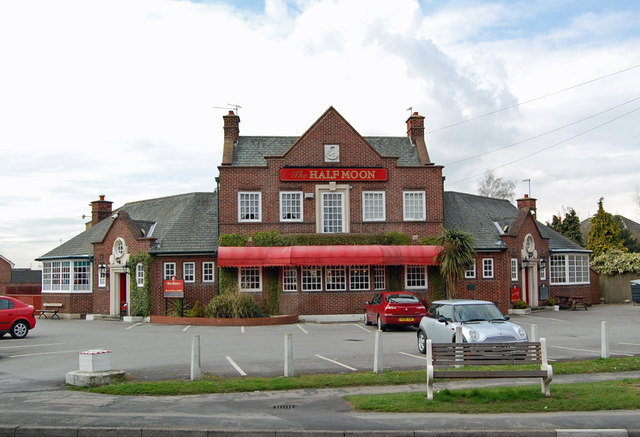
The Half Moon Inn

In 1823, Elloughton was in the Wapentake of Harthill, a part of the Liberty of St Peter's. The patron of the Church of St Mary was the York Minster prebendary of Wetwang. Within the village was a Methodist and a Calvinist chapel. The village had a population of 318, with occupations including six farmers, two carpenters, two tailors, a blacksmith, a shoemaker, and a bricklayer. Also directory-listed were three yeomen, a school master, a gentlewoman, and a curate. Once a week two carriers operated between the village and Hull.

== See also ==
- Listed buildings in Elloughton-cum-Brough
