= St Mary's Church, Elloughton =

Church in Elloughton, East Riding of Yorkshire, England

Coordinates: 53°44′31″N 0°34′11″W

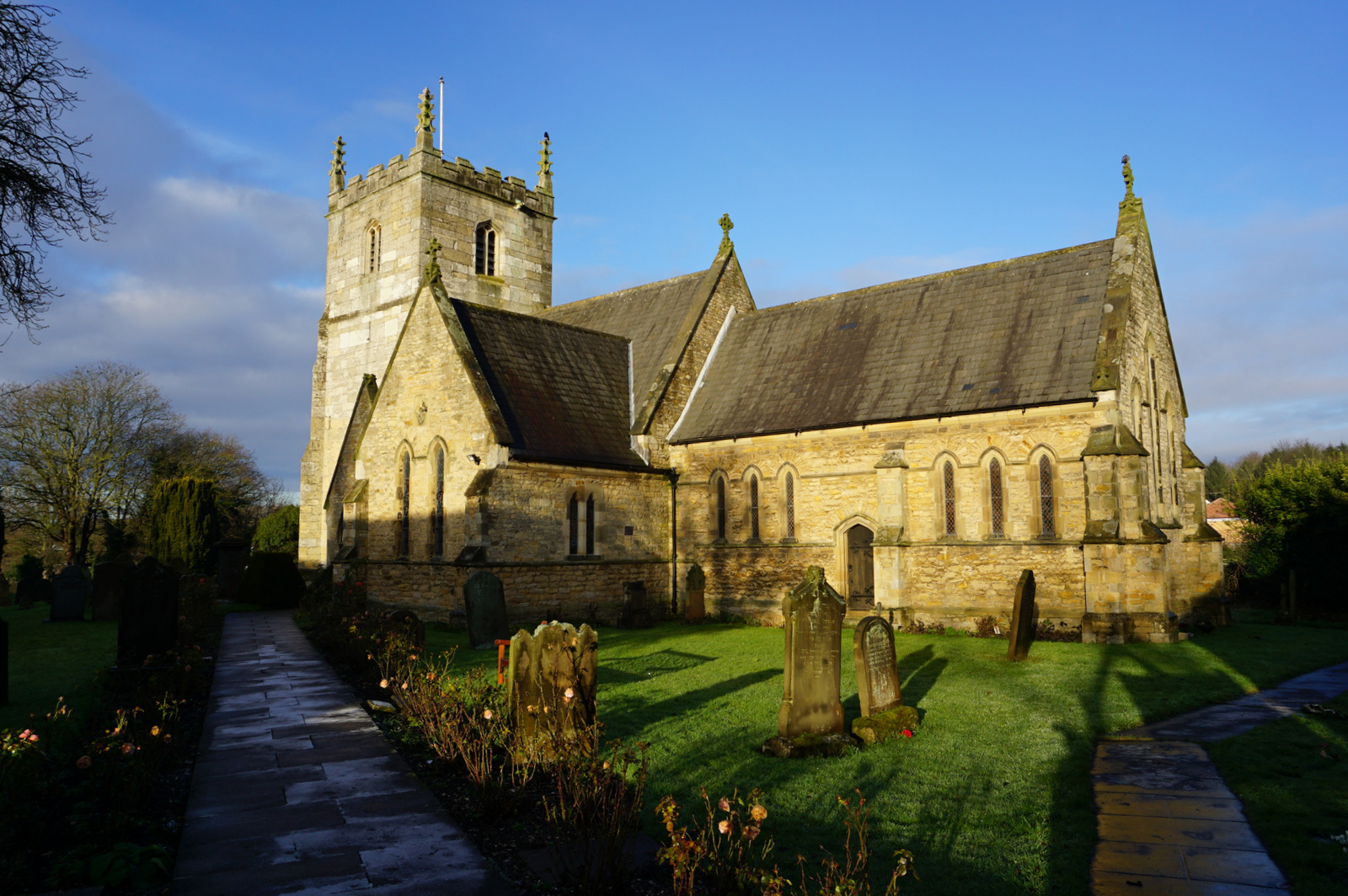
The church, in 2017

St Mary's Church is the parish church of Elloughton, a village in the East Riding of Yorkshire, in England.

A church in Elloughton was recorded in the Domesday Book. The oldest part of the current building is the tower, which was built in the 15th century. The nave and chancel collapsed in 1843 and were rebuilt between 1884 and 1845, using some of the original material. The new work is in the Early English style, and was designed by John Loughborough Pearson. The church suffered a major fire in 1964, following which it was again restored. The building was grade II* listed in 1968.

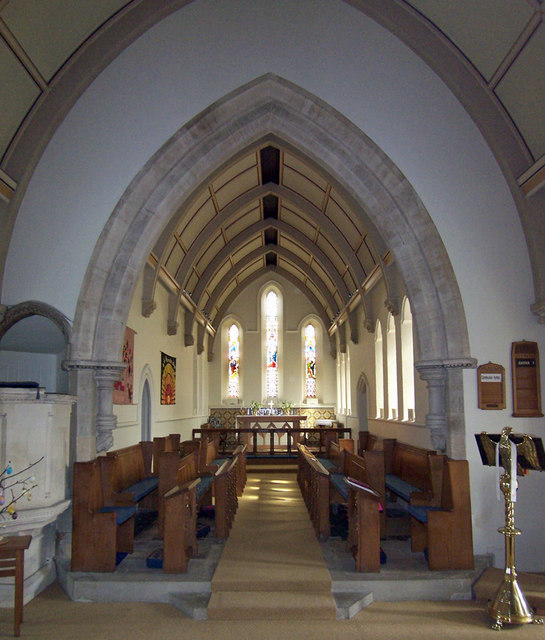
Interior view of the chancel

The tower is in stone, the rest of the church in limestone with freestone dressings and slate roofs. The church consists of a nave, a south porch, north and south transepts, a chancel and a west tower. The tower has two stages, a plinth, diagonal buttresses, slit windows, a chamfered floor band, two-light pointed bell openings with Y-tracery, an eaves string course, and an embattled parapet with crocketed corner pinnacles. The south doorway dates from the 13th century, it has a pointed head and three moulded orders, and a hood mould. Inside, there are three stained glass windows including one designed by A. L. Moore, a stone pulpit designed by Pearson, and a 1928 brass memorial to victims of the R38-class airship crash.

== See also ==
- Grade II* listed buildings in the East Riding of Yorkshire
- Listed buildings in Elloughton-cum-Brough
