= Bernard Wex =

English civil engineer (1922–1990)

Bernard Patrick J. Wex OBE (24 April 1922 – 31 July 1990) was an English civil engineer particularly associated with the design of bridges.

== Early life and education ==
Wex was born on 24 April 1922 in Acton, Middlesex, son of Julius Ernest Peter Wex, a German lace merchant of Regent Street, who had immigrated in 1911, and wife Gertrude. He attended Acton Grammar School, and graduated from Sandhurst in 1942.

Wex wanted to become a pilot, but a minor eye defect precluded him from the RAF; he was commissioned in 1943 and spent the next four years as a tank commander with the 23rd Hussars. He married a Ms. Lambert in 1945, by whom he had two sons.

== Career ==
Wex graduated with first-class honors in civil engineering from London's Imperial College in 1951, then joined the firm of Freeman Fox, working under the bridge designer Gilbert Roberts. Wex was involved in the design of several important bridges under the guidance of Roberts and, later, Oleg Kerensky. He contributed during his career in the design of the Auckland Harbour, Forth, Severn, Ganga and Brahmatputra bridges. He also helped to design High Marnham Power Station.

He is best known as the civil engineer who in 1964 designed the Humber Bridge, which was opened by Queen Elizabeth in 1981 as the world's then longest single-span bridge. He also designed the Myton Swing Bridge in Hull and the Foyle Bridge in Derry.

He was honoured in 1982 by the Queen, who made him an officer of the Order of the British Empire. In 1985 Wex was awarded the Telford Medal by the Institution of Civil Engineers.

Wex chaired the Committee of Enquiry into the March 1969 collapse of the Emley Moor television mast, and helped to found the Steel Construction Institute, of which he was the first chairman in 1986. He was UK chairman of the International Association of Bridge and Structural Engineers.

== Death ==
Wex died on 31 July 1990 of leukaemia.

== Publications ==
B. P. Wex, B.Sc., A.M.I.C.E., M.1nst.W., D. F. McIntosh, A.M.1.Struct.E. (1967). The design of a high pressure pipe bridge over the river Sutlej in West Pakistan. Proceedings of the Institution of Civil Engineers.

B. P. Wex, C. W. Brown. (1981). Existing bridges or new rules— which is right? BRIDGE AERODYNAMICS. Institution of Civil Engineers.

DW SMITH, CD BROWN, RJ BRIDLE, AF GEE, JB DWIGHT, DI BLOCKLEY, CR NEILL, RE MELCHERS, PSA BERRIDGE, JGM WOOD, MF PARSONS, MA CRISFIELD, BP WEX, HJ HOPKINS, T BLENCH, RF BELL, JE DIBLEY, SH WEARNE, SR. (1977). DISCUSSION: BRIDGE FAILURES. Proceedings of the Institution of Civil Engineers. Volume 62 Issue 2, MAY 1977, pp. 257–281.

Wex, B.P. (1979). Case study: the Humber Bridge. IABSE reports of the working commissions.

KR MOFFATT, GL HARGREAVES, S CHATTERJEE, MJ BAKER, PJ DOWLING, ER BRYAN, SJ MATHEWS, MA CRISFIELD, PB KENYON, FH NEEDHAM, GM ROSE, BP WEX, PR BARTLE, PTK LIM (1981). HOW SHOULD RULES OF STRUCTURAL DESIGN BE CODIFIED? Proceedings of the Institution of Civil Engineers. Volume 70 Issue 3, AUGUST 1981, pp. 523–556.

B P WEX, N M GILLESPIE, J KINSELLA. (1984). FOYLE BRIDGE: DESIGN AND TENDER IN A DESIGN AND BUILD COMPETITION. Proceedings of the Institution of Civil Engineers. Volume 76 Issue 2, MAY 1984, pp. 363–386. .

Thorburn, S., Burland, J.B., Cooke, R.W., Gould, H.B., Larnach, W.J. & Wex, B.P. (1989). Soil-structure interaction. The real behaviour of structures. London: The Institution of Structural Engineers.
