= North Cave =

Village and civil parish in the East Riding of Yorkshire, England

Coordinates: 53°46′53″N 0°38′42″W

- Village and civil parish
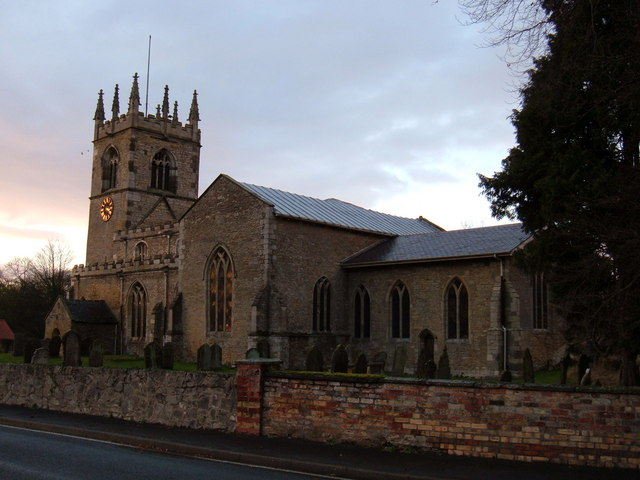
- All Saints Church, North Cave

- Location within the East Riding of Yorkshire
- Population: 1,667 (2011 census)
- OS grid reference: SE894325
  - London: 160 mi (260 km) S
- Civil parish: North Cave
- Unitary authority: East Riding of Yorkshire
- Ceremonial county: East Riding of Yorkshire
- Region: Yorkshire and the Humber
- Country: England
- Sovereign state: United Kingdom
- Post town: BROUGH
- Postcode district: HU15
- Dialling code: 01430
- Police: Humberside
- Fire: Humberside
- Ambulance: Yorkshire
- UK Parliament: Goole and Pocklington

North Cave is a village and civil parish in the East Riding of Yorkshire, England. It is situated 15 miles (24 km) to the west of Hull city centre on the B1230 road. South Cave is approximately 2 miles (3 km) to the south-east.

The civil parish is formed by the village of North Cave and the hamlet of Everthorpe. The 2011 UK census states that North Cave parish had a population of 1,667, a reduction on the 2001 UK census figure of 1,943. North Cave lies within the Parliamentary constituency of Goole and Pocklington.

Baines' History, Directory and Gazetteer of the County of York, stated that William the Conqueror gave the lordship of both North and South Cave to Jordayne, who took the surname 'Cave'. This anecdote is not supported by evidence in Domesday Book, however. which does not list any landholder named "Jordayne". The book identifies several lords and tenants-in-chief for both North and South Cave; beside King William himself, Robert Malet appears to be the primary landholder in 1086, but William I died in 1087, Leaving William II as successor, and so, some land may have transferred after 1086, but more evidence is required to lend credence to this family origin story.

In 1823 North Cave was a civil parish in the Wapentake of Harthill and the Liberty of St Peter's. The Metham family of Metham had at North Cave a house which had been demolished. Existing at the time was a Methodist and a Quaker chapel. Population was 783, with occupations including seven farmers, two butchers, two corn millers, four shoemakers, five shopkeepers, two tailors, two wheelwrights, a blacksmith, two butchers, a paper maker, a bricklayer, two surveyors, one for highways the other for taxes, a schoolmaster, a gardener who was also the parish clerk, and the landlords of The White Horse and Black Swan public houses. Resident were three yeomen, a surgeon, a vicar, a gentleman and two gentlewomen. A carrier operated between the village and Hull twice a week. A Hull to London coach passed through the village twice a day.

The Metham family held the old North Cave Manor house and built Hotham Hall as their new residence on the same estate. The grounds of North Cave manor house were landscaped by Sir George Montgomery Metham, owner 1763–1773. The Hotham estate was sold to Robert Burton in 1773, who incorporated the grounds of the manor house into those of Hotham Hall. The Metham family retained North Cave Manor, which later passed through inheritance to the Carver family who still own the site today, part of which operates as the Williams Den adventure playground.

The Quaker preacher John Richardson was born in North Cave in 1667.

== Community ==
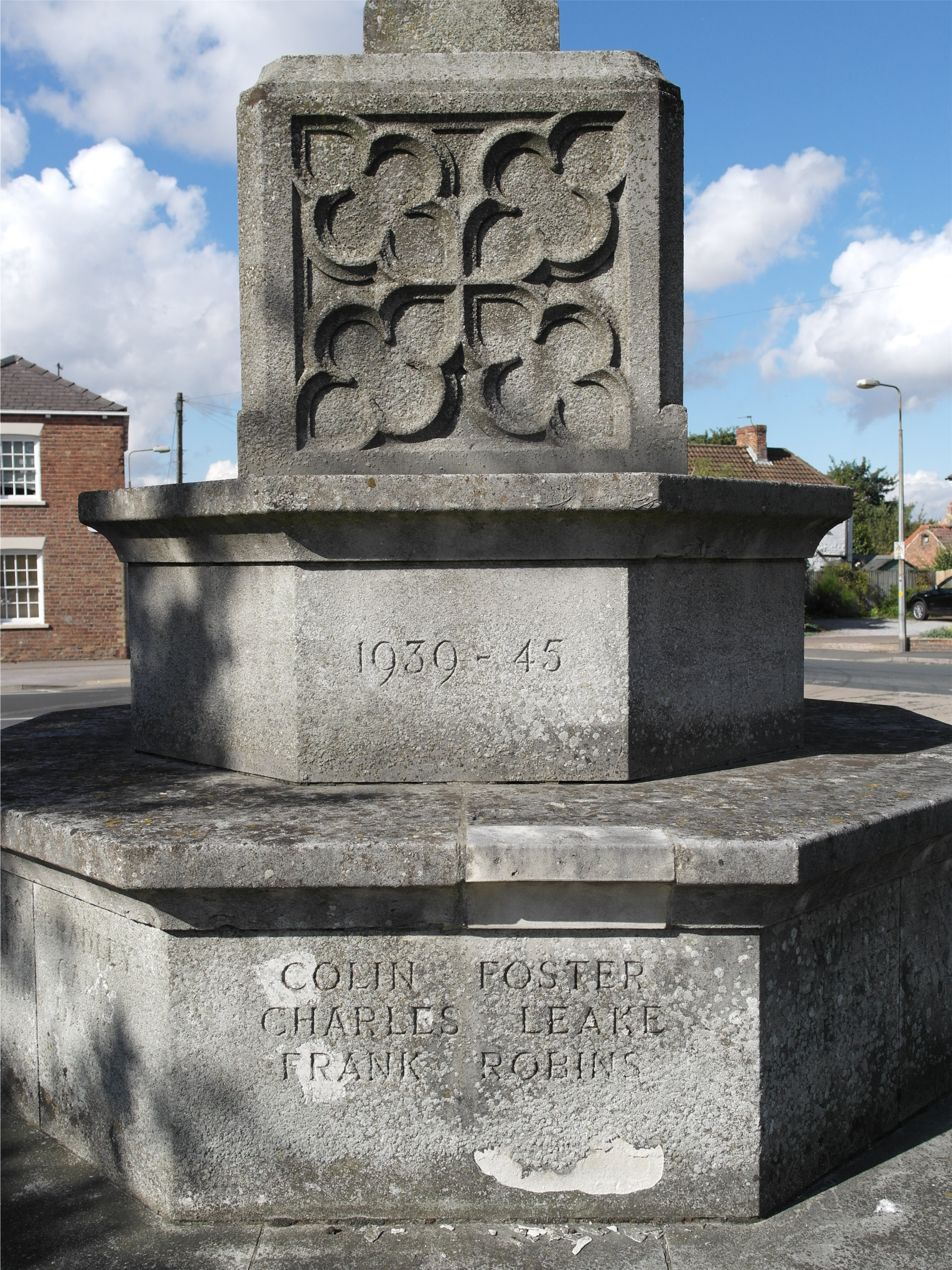
North Cave War Memorial

All Saints' Church, North Cave was designated a Grade I listed building in 1966 and is now recorded in the National Heritage List for England, maintained by Historic England.

North Cave has a public house and a Church of England primary school. Its Sports and Social Club holds an annual Gala Day in June, Bonfire night in November and other events throughout the year. It has an equipped and safe play area for younger children.

The village hall has undergone recent improvements and holds events and a play group for toddlers. It is the location for a local amateur dramatic group, the Cave Players, established for over 25 years, with pantomime and May productions.

To the north of the village is Hotham Hall that was designated a Grade II* listed building in 1966 and is now recorded in the National Heritage List for England, maintained by Historic England. The stable block at the hall is also listed as Grade II*.

Many village shops have closed over the last twenty years in the face of competition from supermarkets, although a newsagent remains.

The village and surrounding area magazine is Village Link, produced by a team of volunteers and distributed free. The web site, although no longer maintained, gives Parish Council and Sports and Social Committee information.

North Cave Wetlands is a nature reserve of regional and national significance, containing a wide biodiversity. It attracts visitors from across the region.

North Cave was served by North Cave railway station on the Hull and Barnsley Railway between 1885 and 1955.

A Quaker meeting house was built, in 1788, next to a holy well that had previously been dedicated to St Helen; the spring soon became known as Quaker Well.

== See also ==
- Listed buildings in North Cave
