= Elloughton-cum-Brough =

Civil parish in the East Riding of Yorkshire, England

Coordinates: 53.7335°N 0.5673°W

- Civil parish
- Population: 10,075 (2011 census)
- OS grid reference: SE945273
- Civil parish: Elloughton-cum-Brough
- Unitary authority: East Riding of Yorkshire
- Ceremonial county: East Riding of Yorkshire
- Region: Yorkshire and the Humber
- Country: England
- Sovereign state: United Kingdom
- Post town: BROUGH
- Postcode district: HU15
- Dialling code: 01482
- Police: Humberside
- Fire: Humberside
- Ambulance: Yorkshire
- UK Parliament: Goole and Pocklington

Elloughton-cum-Brough is a civil parish in the East Riding of Yorkshire, England. It is situated 12 miles (19 km) to the west of Hull city centre and covering an area of 975.545 hectares (2,410.62 acres).

It comprises the town of Brough and the village of Elloughton.

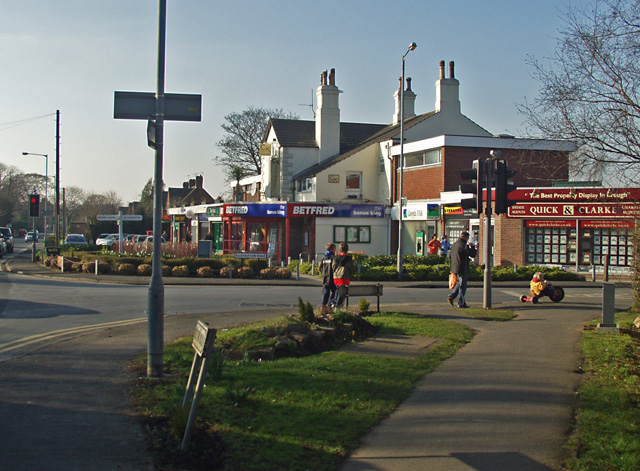
Brough

According to the 2011 UK census, Elloughton-cum-Brough parish had a population of 10,075, an increase on the 2001 UK census figure of 7,388.

== History ==
On 1 April 1935 the parish was renamed from "Elloughton with Brough" to "Elloughton". On 1 April 1984 the parish was renamed to "Elloughton cum Brough". In 2011, the parish council resolved to be called the Elloughton-cum-Brough Town Council.

== See also ==
- Listed buildings in Elloughton-cum-Brough
