= Brough, East Riding of Yorkshire =

Town in the East Riding of Yorkshire, England

Coordinates: 53°43′47″N 0°34′01″W

Brough
- Sunflower sculpture

- Location within the East Riding of Yorkshire
- Population: 13,331 (2021 Census)
- OS grid reference: SE942266
  - London: 155 mi (249 km) S
- Civil parish: Elloughton-cum-Brough
- Unitary authority: East Riding of Yorkshire
- Ceremonial county: East Riding of Yorkshire
- Region: Yorkshire and the Humber
- Country: England
- Sovereign state: United Kingdom
- Post town: BROUGH
- Postcode district: HU15
- Dialling code: 01482
- Police: Humberside
- Fire: Humberside
- Ambulance: Yorkshire
- UK Parliament: Goole and Pocklington

Brough (/ˈbrʌf/ BRUF, locally /ˈbrʊf/) is a town in the East Riding of Yorkshire, England. It is part of the civil parish of Elloughton-cum-Brough with the neighbouring village of Elloughton. Brough is situated on the edge of the Yorkshire Wolds and the town serves as a gateway to the rolling hills of the Wolds. The Yorkshire Wolds Way National Trail also passes by the eastern end of Brough. At the 2021 census, Brough had a population of 13,331.

Brough has a long association with BAE Systems. Brough has been recognised as one of the most desirable and affluent places to live in Yorkshire, with a rising affluent population and a growing reputation for prestige, quality of life, and thriving communities such as Elloughton-cum-Brough In Bloom.

== History ==
The town was known as Petuaria during the Roman period, and served as the capital of the Celtic tribe of the Parisi. Petuaria marked the southern end of the Roman road known now as Cade's Road which ran roughly northwards for a hundred miles to Pons Aelius (modern day Newcastle upon Tyne).

The town's name is from the Old English burh meaning "fortification" and is related to the terms borough and burgh.

Brough was created a town by the Archbishop of York in 1239 and granted the same liberties as Beverley. There is no record of these liberties having been employed, and the settlement operated as a village for further centuries.

The town is associated with the highwayman Dick Turpin. About June 1737 Turpin boarded at the Ferry Inn at Brough, under the alias of John Palmer (or Parmen). Turpin travelled to and from and resided in Brough, until his capture and execution for horse theft in 1739.

== Demographics ==
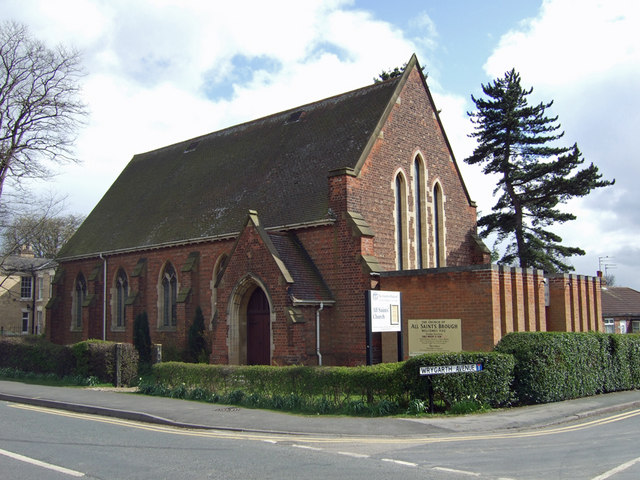
All Saints' Church, Brough

There has been a shift in the socio-economic group of people living in Brough because of improved rail links and new housing developments including the Brough South development. This change has brought more money into the area. As a result, the average wage rate and amount of spending has increased significantly.

== Amenities ==
Brough has a range of shops and takeaways, and two supermarkets: Morrisons, Aldi, Sainsbury's Local, Lidl. There are two dentists, two vets, hairdressers, a medical centre, a private hearing aid audiologist, a post office. Brough also has a couple of public houses, including The Buccaneer and The Red Hawk.

== Education ==
Education at Brough is provided by Brough Primary School and Hunsley Primary School. The nearest secondary school is South Hunsley School and Sixth Form College, approximately 2 miles (3 km) to the east in Melton.

== Media ==
Local news and television programmes are provided by BBC Yorkshire and Lincolnshire and ITV Yorkshire. Television signals are received from the Belmont TV transmitter.

Local radio stations are BBC Radio Humberside, Greatest Hits Radio East Yorkshire, Nation Radio East Yorkshire and Capital Yorkshire.

The town is served by the local newspaper, Hull Daily Mail.

== Transport ==
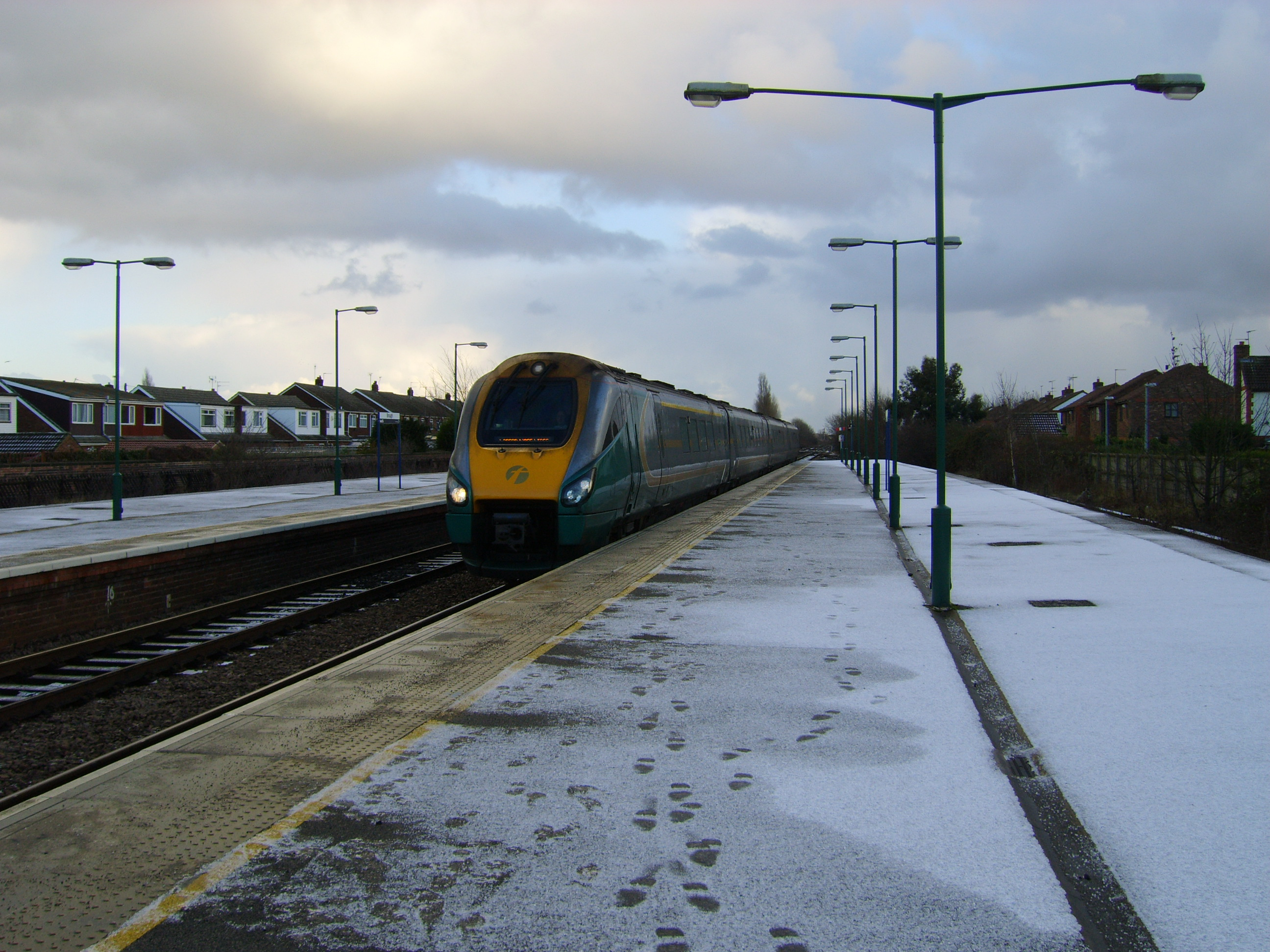
Hull Trains Class 222 Pioneer train arriving at Brough railway station

The town is served by Brough railway station on the Hull to Selby and Doncaster railway line. Direct rail services to London are provided by Hull Trains and London North Eastern Railway. Other services are TransPennine Express trains running west to Leeds, Manchester Piccadilly, Liverpool, and Northern to York, Doncaster and Sheffield. All east-bound trains run to Hull: some then run north to Cottingham, Beverley, Driffield, Bridlington, Filey and Scarborough.

Most local bus services are provided by East Yorkshire Motor Services. The services run to Hull as well as other towns and villages in the East Riding such as Goole, Howden, North Ferriby and Beverley. National Express also stop at Brough.

The town lies 1 mile (1.6 km) south of the main A63 from Hull to the M62. It is about 1 mile (1.6 km) to the A63 junction east, 2 miles (3.2 km) to the junction west (and then a further 4 miles (6.4 km) to the M62 motorway). Humberside Airport is 19 miles (31 km) to the south-east (reached by driving across the Humber Bridge), and overnight ferry services by P&O Ferries sail to Rotterdam and Zeebrugge from King George Dock, Hull (about 13 miles (21 km) away).

== BAE Systems ==
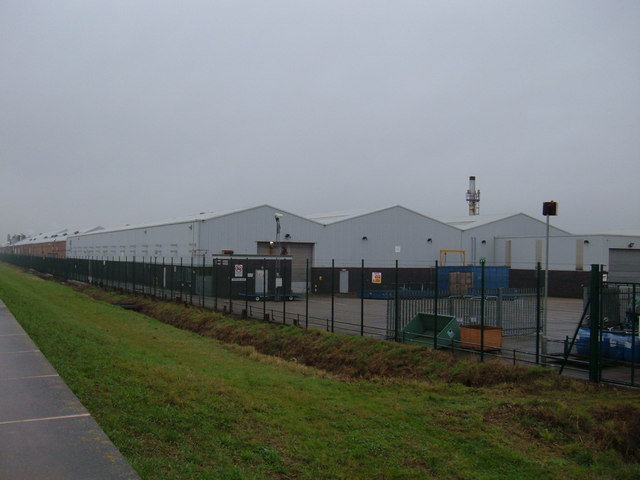
BAE Systems factory in Brough.

BAE Systems (formerly British Aerospace), Brough, manufactured the Hawk Advanced Jet Trainer aircraft at Brough Aerodrome. BAE provided apprenticeships to local school leavers. The runway at the site was re-opened for a while for occasional use solely by Hawk aircraft taking off after manufacture to transfer by air to Warton near Preston in Lancashire for final flight testing and painting though the former Air Traffic Control building has now been transformed into the Brough Business Centre.

On 3 April 2008 BAE Systems announced it would be losing 450 jobs from the Brough site. On 1 March 2012 BAE Systems announced it would be ending manufacturing at its site in Brough with 845 employees to be made redundant. Manufacturing at the plant ceased on Christmas Eve 2020. There are now proposals to build over much of the airfield – including the runway. As of 2020, construction on the runway has started with phase two of the Brough South development (Brough Relief Road).

== Notable people ==
- Robert Stephenson (1906–1942), first-class cricketer and Royal Navy officer
- Keir Mather, Labour MP for Selby in North Yorkshire
- Jess Park, Manchester United and England footballer

== See also ==
- Listed buildings in Elloughton-cum-Brough
