= Hensall =

Hensall may refer to:

- Hensall, North Yorkshire, a village and civil parish in North Yorkshire, England
- Hensall railway station, which serves the village of Hensall, North Yorkshire
- Hensall, Ontario, a community in Huron County, Ontario, Canada
