= The Red House, Hensall =

Historic house in Hensall, England

Coordinates: 53°41′47″N 1°07′10″W

The Red House is a historic building in Hensall, North Yorkshire, a village in England.

The house was built in 1854 by William Butterfield, as part of a group with St Paul's Church, Hensall and Hensall Primary School. It was constructed as the vicarage for the church, but later became a private house. Peter Ferriday sees the house as presaging arts and crafts architecture, saying that it "could easily be mistaken for a house by Philip Webb, and challenges the Red House [in Bexleyheath] as the first example of a conscious Victorian return to an honest unpretentious style of house-building". It is a grade II* listed building.

The house is built of pinkish-brown brick with a grey slate roof. There are two storeys, three bays, and a single-story rear range. The doorway has a pointed fanlight under a pointed arch. The windows are sashes, some tripartite, those in the ground floor under header arches and pointed relieving arches, and there is a half-hipped roof dormer. Inside, there are numerous original features, including the bookshelves and fireplace in the library; fireplace and panelling in the dining room; and the staircase. There are also many original doors and some window shutters.

== See also ==
- Grade II* listed buildings in North Yorkshire (district)
- Listed buildings in Hensall, North Yorkshire
