= Rawcliffe railway station =

Railway station in the East Riding of Yorkshire, England

Rawcliffe
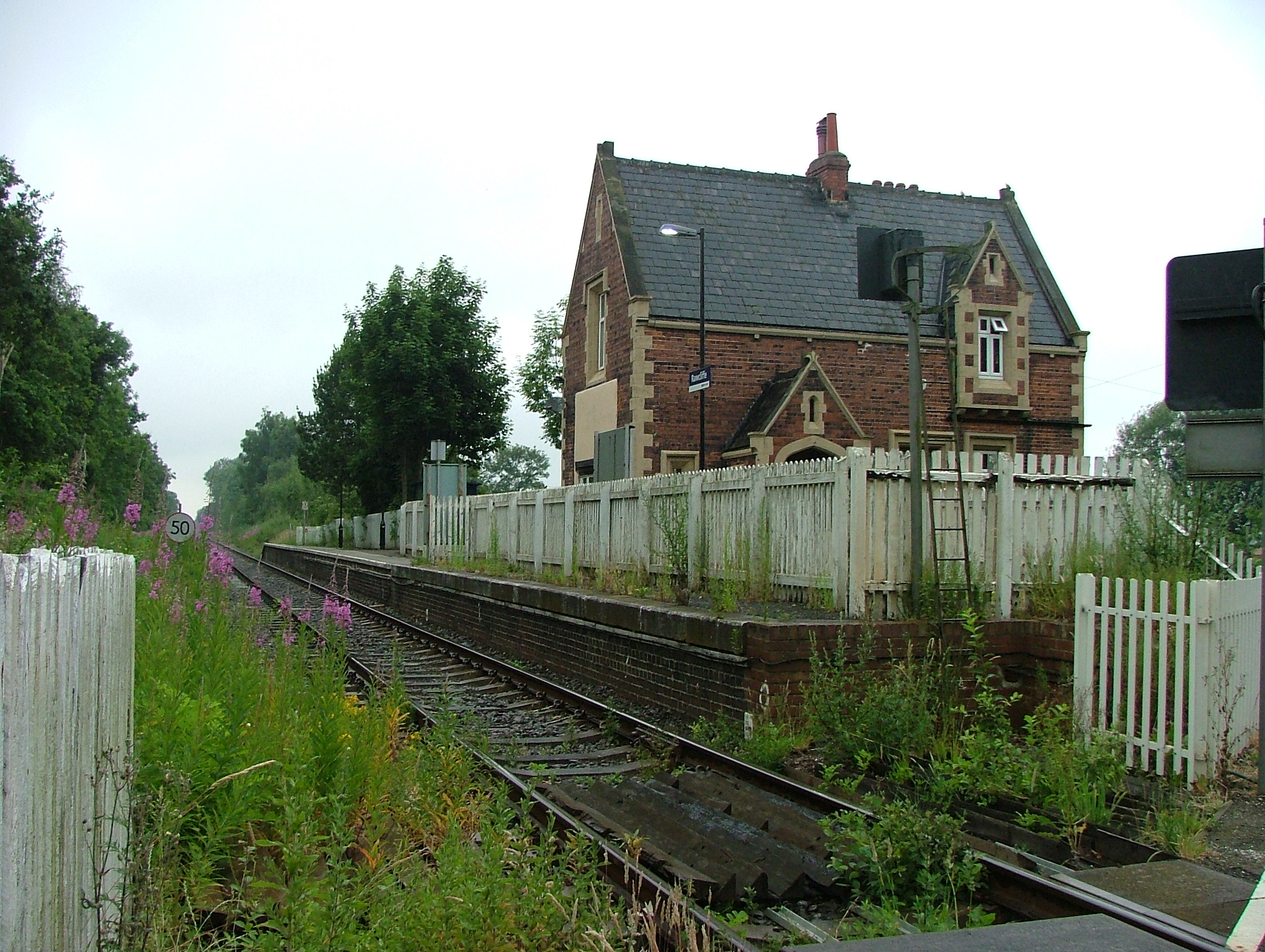

General information
- Location: Rawcliffe, East Riding of Yorkshire; England
- Coordinates: 53.68902°N 0.95900°W
- Grid reference: SE687218
- Manager: Northern Trains
- Platforms: 1

Other information
- Station code: RWC
- Classification: DfT category F2

History
- Opened: 1 April 1848

Passengers
- 2021/22: ▲218
- 2022/23: ▲442
- 2023/24: ▲498
- 2024/25: ▼412
- 2025/26: ▲442
Location
Notes
- Passenger statistics from the Office of Rail and Road

Rawcliffe railway station is a railway station that serves the village of Rawcliffe in the East Riding of Yorkshire, England. The station is located on the Pontefract Line.

The line passing through here was once a busy passenger and freight link to the inland port of Goole (the line and station first being opened by the Lancashire and Yorkshire Railway on 1 April 1848) but since the mid-1980s much of the traffic that once used this route has disappeared. The route is single track between Hensall and Goole, the level crossing here has been automated and the rail-served freight terminal in Goole docks sees little use. The station has also been downsized and its signal box demolished.

The former five trains each way per day service of the late 1980s (see British Rail National Passenger Timetables from May 1988–90) was cut in half in 1991 (due to shortage of rolling stock) and again in 2004, leaving only a residual "Parliamentary" minimum timetable in operation east of Knottingley to avoid the need for statutory closure proceedings – a situation that remains unchanged to this day.

== Facilities ==
The station is unstaffed with only part of the one remaining platform in use (though the defunct station building still stands and is used as a private residence). A single waiting shelter, timetable poster board and public telephone are the only facilities provided. Tickets can only be purchased in advance or on the train, as there is no ticketing provision. Step-free access is available between the car park and platform.

== Services ==
Rawcliffe is served by a limited service of 3 trains per day Monday-Saturday only. There are 2 trains per day to Leeds (1 in the morning and 1 in the evening) and 1 train per day to Goole (in the evening only). The station is not served on Sundays.

Preceding station	National Rail	Following station
Snaith	Northern Trains Pontefract line Limited Service	Goole
