= Snaith railway station =

Railway station in the East Riding of Yorkshire, England

Snaith
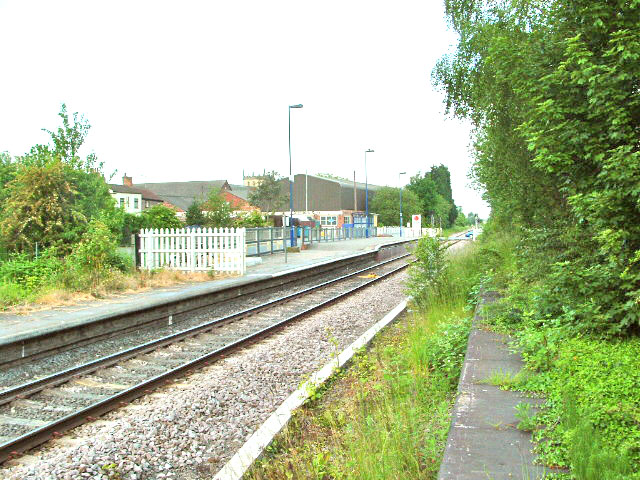

General information
- Location: Snaith, East Riding of Yorkshire; England
- Coordinates: 53.69279°N 1.02600°W
- Grid reference: SE643222
- Manager: Northern Trains
- Platforms: 1

Other information
- Station code: SNI
- Classification: DfT category F2

History
- Opened: 1 April 1848

Passengers
- 2021/22: ▲736
- 2022/23: ▲1,510
- 2023/24: ▼1,482
- 2024/25: ▼1,254
- 2025/26: ▲1,744
Location
Notes
- Passenger statistics from the Office of Rail and Road

Snaith railway station serves the market town of Snaith in the East Riding of Yorkshire, England. It is located 26 miles (42 km) east of Leeds railway station on the Pontefract Line, between Knottingley and Goole.

The station is managed by Northern Trains and is classified by the Department for Transport as category F2.

The former five trains each way per day service of the late 1980s (see British Rail National Passenger Timetables from May 1988–90) was cut in half in 1991 (due to shortage of rolling stock) and again in 2004, leaving only a residual "Parliamentary" minimum timetable in operation east of Knottingley to avoid the need for statutory closure proceedings - a situation that remains unchanged to this day.

== History ==
The station opened with the Wakefield, Pontefract and Goole Railway in 1848. The line had been authorised in 1845 and was taken over by the Manchester and Leeds Railway before opening, that company became the Lancashire and Yorkshire Railway in 1847.

Snaith originally had two platforms and a signal box for the adjacent sidings and level crossing. Following the singling of the Gowdall Junction to Goole section in the 1980s, only one platform remains in use and the signal box was later demolished, with the crossing automated.

Through later ownership changes the station passed from the L&YR to the London and North Western Railway then to the London, Midland and Scottish Railway at the 1923 Grouping, and to British Railways on nationalisation in 1948.

== Facilities ==
The station is unstaffed and has no ticket office or ticket machines, so tickets are bought in advance or on the train. There are no toilets, waiting room or customer help points. The single platform has step-free access from the entrance, and ramps are available from train staff for boarding.

Cycle stands are on the platform and a small car park adjoins the station. In February 2025 the town council announced that parking charges at the station car park had been withdrawn under an agreement with Northern. Rail-replacement buses use the pick-up and set-down point by the adjacent level crossing.

== Services ==
All services at Snaith are operated by Northern Trains. The station has an extremely limited timetable: on Mondays to Saturdays three trains call each day, with two services to Leeds and one to Goole. There is no Sunday service.

Preceding station	National Rail	Following station
Hensall	Northern Trains Pontefract line Limited Service	Rawcliffe
