= Airmyn railway station =

Disused railway station in the East Riding of Yorkshire, England

Airmyn

General information
- Location: Airmyn, East Riding of Yorkshire; England
- Coordinates: 53.706°N 0.938°W
- Grid reference: SE702238
- Platforms: Originally 2, 1 from about 1923

Other information
- Status: Disused

History
- Original company: North Eastern Railway
- Pre-grouping: North Eastern Railway
- Post-grouping: London and North Eastern Railway

Key dates
- 1 May 1912: Opened as Airmyn and Rawcliffe
- 12 June 1961: Renamed Airmyn
- 15 June 1964: Closed to passengers
- 7 December 1964: Closed completely
Location

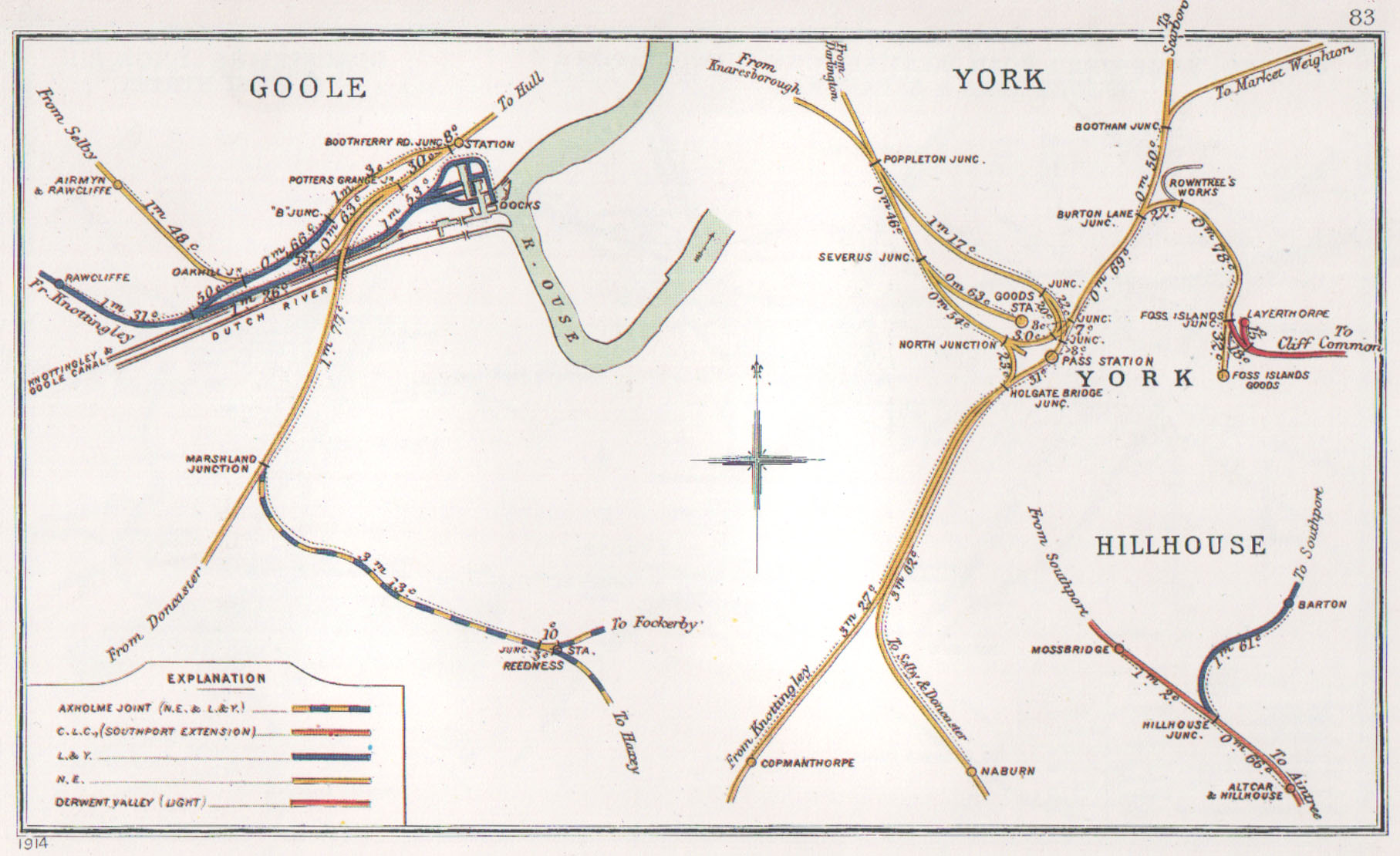
A 1914 Railway Clearing House Junction Diagram showing the station and its link to Goole

Airmyn railway station was on the Selby to Goole Line. It served the village of Airmyn in the East Riding of Yorkshire, England.

== History ==
The station was opened by the North Eastern Railway on 1 May 1912 as Airmyn and Rawcliffe. It became part of the London and North Eastern Railway under the Grouping of 1923. The station then passed on to the Eastern Region of British Railways on nationalisation in 1948. It was renamed on 12 June 1961 to Airmyn.

The single storey station and platforms were built entirely of wood. Two sidings led off the through line behind the main station building.

The line and station were built with double tracks and platforms, but most of the route, including Airmyn and Rawcliffe, was reduced to single track around 1923. The passenger service was withdrawn by the British Railways Board on 15 June 1964, the goods service followed on 7 December of that year. The tracks and associated infrastructure were subsequently lifted.

== The site today ==
There is a large building on the platform which still exists.

== Sources ==
- Butt, R. V. J. (October 1995). The Directory of Railway Stations: details every public and private passenger station, halt, platform and stopping place, past and present (1st ed.). Sparkford: Patrick Stephens Ltd. ISBN 978-1-85260-508-7. OCLC 60251199. OL 11956311M.
- Chapman, Stephen (2002). Selby & Goole. Railway Memories. Todmorden: Bellcode Books. ISBN 978-1-871233-14-8. 14.
- Fell, Mike G (2016). An Illustrated History of the Port of Goole and its Railways. Clophill: Irwell Press. ISBN 978-1-906919-82-5.
- Goode, C. T. (1976). The Goole and Selby Railway. Blandford: The Oakwood Press. ISBN 978-0-85-361205-6. 100.
- Jowett, Alan (2000). Jowett's Nationalised Railway Atlas (1st ed.). Penryn, Cornwall: Atlantic Transport Publishers. ISBN 978-0-906899-99-1. OCLC 228266687.
- Jowett, Alan (March 1989). Jowett's Railway Atlas of Great Britain and Ireland: From Pre-Grouping to the Present Day (1st ed.). Sparkford: Patrick Stephens Ltd. ISBN 978-1-85260-086-0. OCLC 22311137.
- Smith, Paul; Turner, Keith (2012). Railway Atlas Then and Now. Shepperton: Ian Allan Publishing. ISBN 978-0-7110-3695-6.
- The Goole and Selby Railway

== Service ==
Preceding station	Disused railways	Following station
Drax Hales; Line and station closed	Selby to Goole Line (NER)	Goole; Line closed, station open
