= Barlow Church =

Church building in Barlow, North Yorkshire, England

Coordinates: 53°45′12″N 1°01′23″W

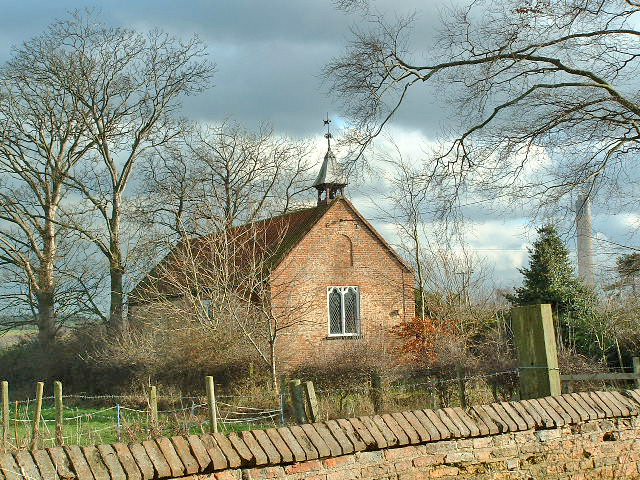
The building in 2006, while in use as a church

Barlow Church is a former parish church in Barlow, North Yorkshire, a village in England.

There was a chapel of ease in the village, dependent on St Wilfrid's Church, Brayton, recorded in 1649. The chapel appears to have become disused following the English Restoration, but the current building was constructed before the end of the century. It was restored and altered in 1774, and again in the 19th century. In the 1970s, it was reordered, and more of the interior was given over to the chancel. It was Grade II listed in 1998. The church closed in 2012, and was converted into a house.

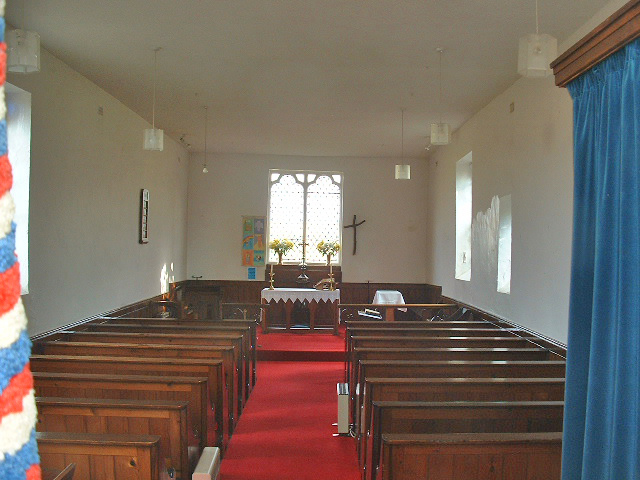
Interior, before conversion

The three-bay building is constructed of brick, with a pantile roof. There is a small wooden bellcote atop the south gable, with a lead roof and ornate weathervane. The south, west and north facades each have one two-light window, while the east facade has the entrance door and two windows. Before its conversion, there were 19th century pews, and a lectern and altar of similar date, and a brass war memorial plaque dating to about 1920. The Church of England describes it as "a simple, charming building".
