= Barlow railway station =

Disused railway station in North Yorkshire, England

Barlow
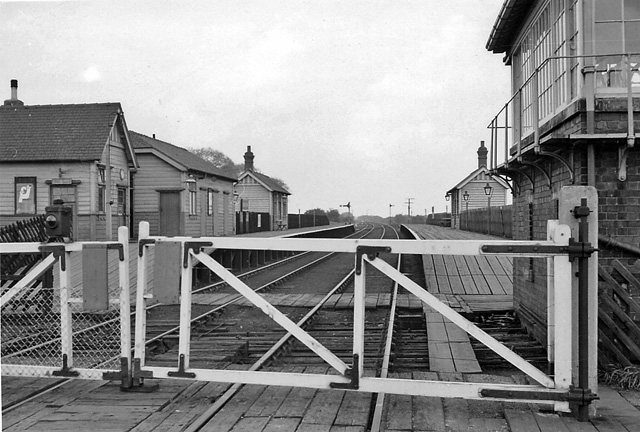
- The former station in 1961

General information
- Location: Barlow, North Yorkshire; England
- Coordinates: 53.746108°N 1.034731°W
- Grid reference: SE645285
- Platforms: 2

Other information
- Status: Disused

History
- Original company: North Eastern Railway
- Pre-grouping: North Eastern Railway
- Post-grouping: London and North Eastern Railway

Key dates
- 1912: Station opened
- 1964: Station closed to passengers and goods
- 1980: Line closed to depot traffic
- 1983: Line dismantled
Location

Barlow railway station was a railway station that served the village of Barlow in North Yorkshire, England from 1912 to 1964 via the Selby to Goole line. The area is now known as the site of Barlow Common Nature Reserve.

== History ==
Construction of the Selby to Goole line began in 1907 and it was decided that one of the intermediate stations would be placed at Barlow. The line opened for freight traffic in December 1910, and the station opened to passengers in May 1912.

The station enabled the construction of an airship production factory in Barlow and later an ordnance depot, both of which used a branch from the station.

The station closed to passengers in June 1964 and was later completely demolished. Although much of Selby to Goole line was dismantled, the track from Brayton junction to the munitions depot in Barlow remained opened. The branch to the depot was later extended 1/2 mile (0.8 km) in October 1966 to provide connection to Drax Power Station when it was being built.

Barlow ordnance depot closed in 1981, and the branch of line to the site was dismantled. By 1983, much of the line from the Brayton junction was also dismantled.

=== Barlow Common ===
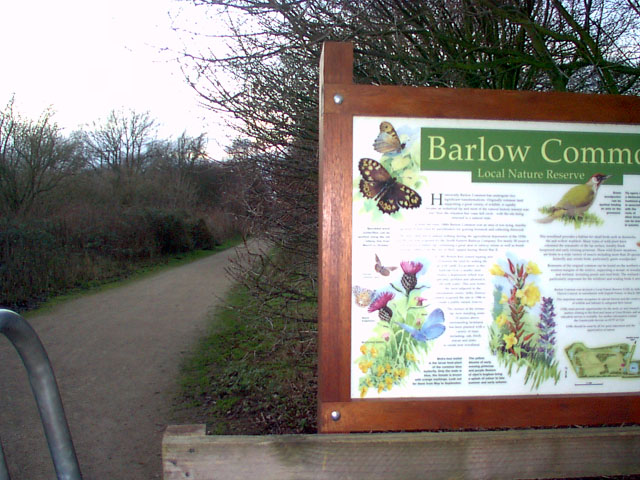
Entrance to Barlow Common in 2007

Before the site was purchased by the NER company, Barlow Common was used as an area for pasturing livestock.

In the 1940s, the area beside the station began to be used as a railway refuse and ballast tip, however this ceased in 1983 after asbestos was discovered. British Rail later reclaimed the land and covered the ground with soil.

In 1986, Selby District Council acquired the land and converted it into a nature reserve. It has since seen the return of many species of flora and fauna. It was declared a local nature reserve in March 2002.

Barlow Common is also used as a scout campsite.

Preceding station	Disused railways	Following station
Selby	Selby to Goole Line (NER)	Drax Hales
