= Drax Hales railway station =

Disused railway station in North Yorkshire, England

Drax Hales
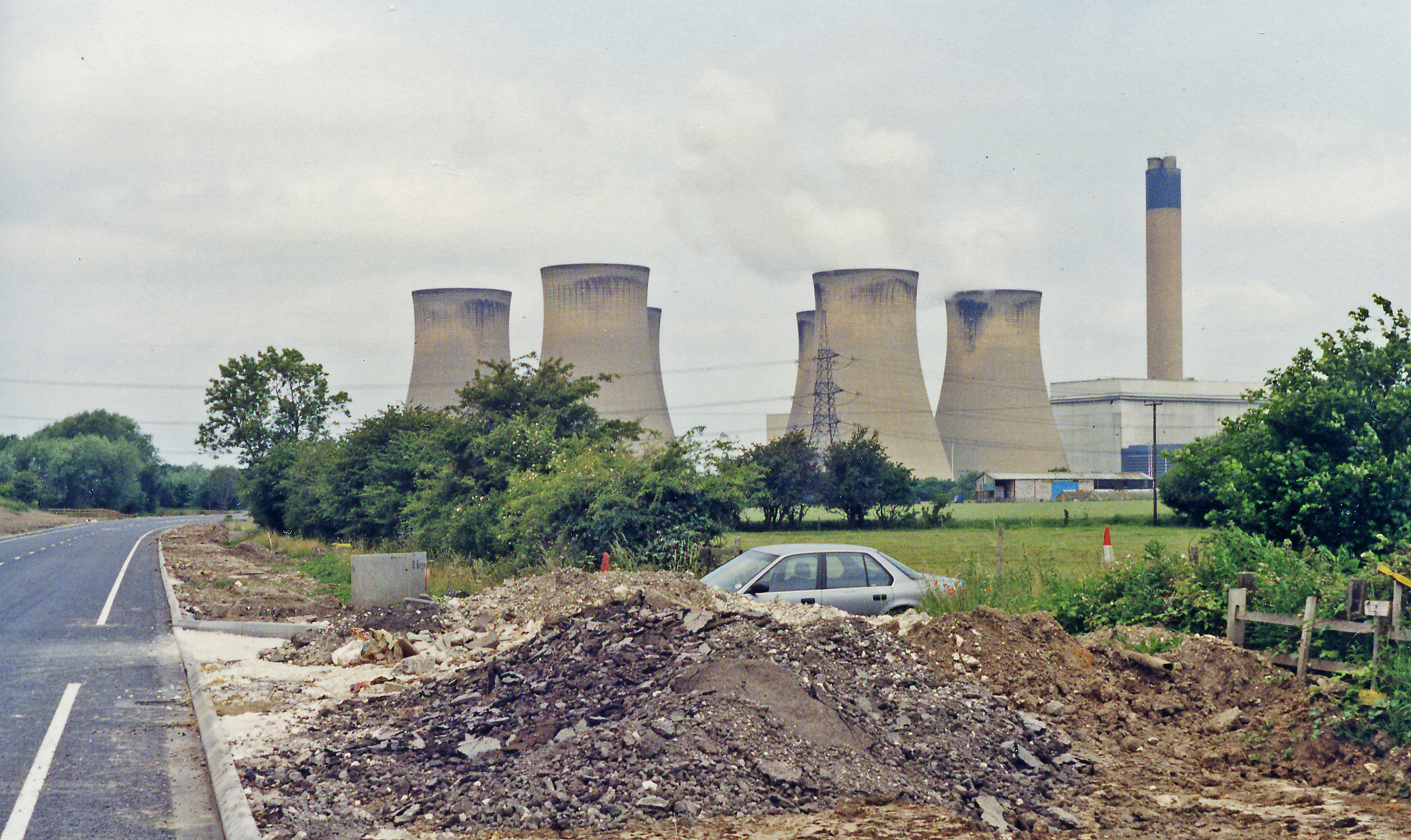
- The site of the station in 1992 during construction of the A645 road.

General information
- Location: Drax, North Yorkshire; England
- Coordinates: 53.724354°N 0.985981°W
- Grid reference: SE667284
- Platforms: 2

Other information
- Status: Disused

History
- Original company: North Eastern Railway
- Pre-grouping: North Eastern Railway
- Post-grouping: London and North Eastern Railway

Key dates
- 1912: Station opened
- 1964: Station closed to passengers and goods
Location

Drax Hales railway station was one of two railway stations that served the village of Drax in North Yorkshire, England. It opened to passengers and goods in 1912 as part of the Selby to Goole line and later closed in 1964 as part of the Beeching cuts. The area is now occupied by the A645 road.

== History ==
Construction of the Selby to Goole line began in 1907 and one of the intermediate stations was placed at Drax. The line opened for freight traffic in December 1910, and the station opened to passengers in May 1912. Before Drax Hales opened, the village was served by Drax Abbey railway station. Much of the station, including the platforms were of timber construction.

The station closed to passengers in June 1964 and has since been completely demolished. In the early 1990s, the A645 road was constructed on the former track-bed of the Selby to Goole line.

== Service ==
Preceding station	Disused railways	Following station
Barlow	Selby to Goole Line (NER)	Airmyn
