= Barlow, North Yorkshire =

Village and civil parish in North Yorkshire, England

Coordinates: 53°45′01″N 1°01′15″W

Barlow
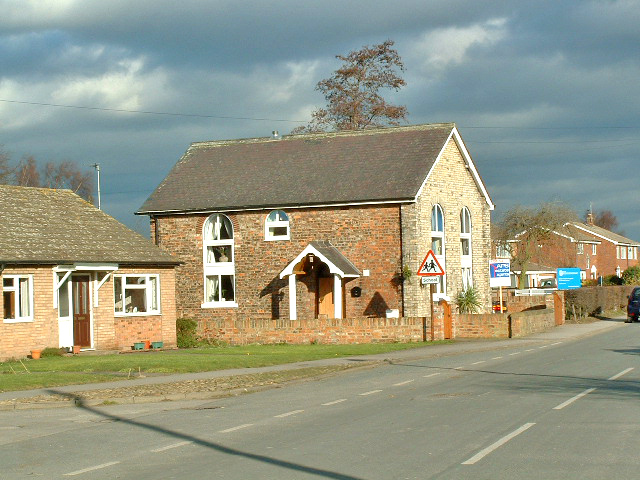
- Old Methodist Chapel, Barlow

- Location within North Yorkshire
- Population: 753 (2011 census)
- OS grid reference: SE645285
- Unitary authority: North Yorkshire
- Ceremonial county: North Yorkshire
- Region: Yorkshire and the Humber
- Country: England
- Sovereign state: United Kingdom
- Post town: SELBY
- Postcode district: YO8
- Dialling code: 01757
- Police: North Yorkshire
- Fire: North Yorkshire
- Ambulance: Yorkshire

Barlow is a small village and civil parish located in the county of North Yorkshire, England, about 16 miles south of York. In the 2011 census, it had around 290 houses and a population of 753. As of recent updates it has a population of around 800 to 900 and roughly 300 houses.

The village has very few amenities, but there is a primary school and a licensed social club run by a committee of members. There are three entrances to the village, two of which lead from the A1041 road between Selby and Camblesforth. The other entrance is a single-track road leading from the Selby bypass. The village's two nature reserves offer a network of paths and bridleways for woodland walks but neither allows horse riding. Barlow common also has a private fishing area and information centre.

Before the 19th century, Barlow was usually known as 'Berlay' or 'Barley'. The village was historically part of the West Riding of Yorkshire until 1974. From 1974 to 2023 it was part of the Selby District, it is now administered by the unitary North Yorkshire Council.

== Overview ==
Barlow is an essentially rural village, situated about three miles from the town of Selby and from the motorway network. More recently the village could best be described as a dormitory village for commuters to Selby, York and Leeds. At the very end of the village is a roundabout, and beyond this the gated entrance can be found to the Skylark Nature Reserve and Education Centre. Also operating from the reserve is the Yorkshire Swan & Wildlife Rescue Hospital, a local registered charity where many thousands of injured animals are treated and rehabilitated back to the wild each year.

The services of the village are limited, with only the primary school and social club being the main amenities. Formally the village had a Post Office and Public House, although both of these ceased to operate in the last century. The village has a mixed-use hall near the social club, being prominently used as a daytime nursery and gym.

Barlow Church held weekly services and as well as services for the Primary school. It was closed by the parish of Brayton in 2012, due to the very small congregation coming to the weekly services. The vicar however still makes visits to the primary school, to celebrate important events in the Christian calendar.

== History ==
Evidence of Barlow was first recorded in 1020, in a survey of the estates of the Archbishop of York. After the Norman Conquest, it was part of an estate centred on Drax manor. The only physical evidence of medieval settlement in Barlow is the earthworks around the present Barlow Hall farm. The furrow fields suggest that the area was in use around the time of the Norman Conquest, as the settlement was recorded in the Domesday Book as 'Berlai'.

In 1520, London gentry family the Thompsons purchased the lands and built Barlow Hall and later the village chapel in the 16th century. The population grew during the industrial period and the main layout of Barlow was erected around this time. Much of the present housing was built in the last century.

The village was the site of an airship production factory in the early part of the 20th century. Established by Whitworth & Co Ltd, it was responsible for the construction of the 25r, R29 and R33 during the First World War. However, in the aftermath of the war, the site became disused and the factory closed being replaced by a munitions depot in 1930. When Drax power station began construction in 1967 the supply depot was discontinued by the Ministry of Defence. The site had been mostly demolished by the late 1970s and all remains of now lie under the ash tip of Barlow Mound.

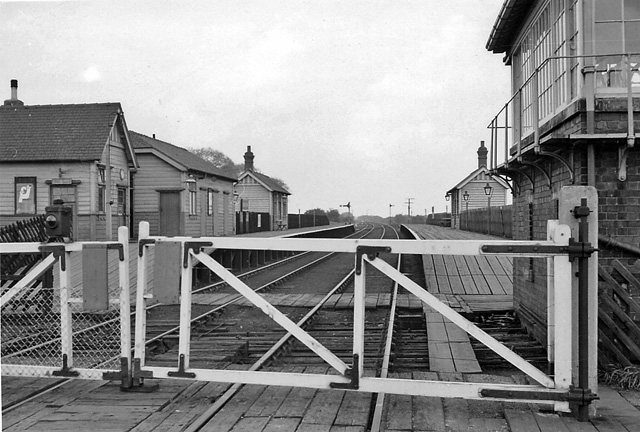
Barlow Railway Station facing west c. 1961

In 1912, the NER established the Selby-Goole railway line which ran through the current nature reserve down to the merry-go-rounds at Drax. It enabled the construction of the airship factory and later the ordnance depot. The station closed to passengers in 1964 but the line was still used by the depot; and for construction on Drax power station until 1983. The line was completely dismantled by 1986 and the nearby ballast tip was replaced by Barlow Common. It was declared a local nature reserve in March 2002.

== See also ==
- Barlow railway station
