= Arram railway station =

Railway station in the East Riding of Yorkshire, England

Arram
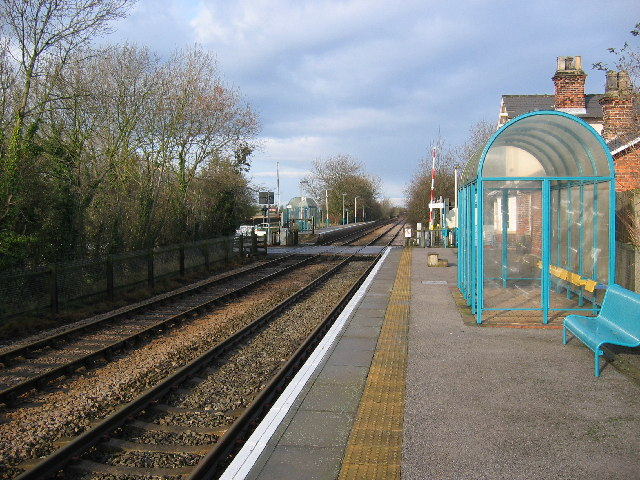

General information
- Location: Arram, East Riding of Yorkshire; England
- Coordinates: 53.884000°N 0.425000°W
- Grid reference: TA035442
- Manager: Northern
- Platforms: 2

Other information
- Station code: ARR
- Classification: DfT category F2

History
- Opened: 1853

Passengers
- 2021/22: ▲738
- 2022/23: ▼598
- 2023/24: ▲1,790
- 2024/25: ▼1,030
- 2025/26: ▲1,310
Location
Notes
- Passenger statistics from the Office of Rail and Road

Arram railway station serves the small village of Arram in the East Riding of Yorkshire, England. It is located on the Yorkshire Coast Line and is operated by Northern who provide all passenger train services. It is mentioned in the song "Slow Train" by Flanders and Swann.

== History ==
Opened by the York and North Midland Railway, then by the North Eastern Railway, it became part of the London and North Eastern Railway during the Grouping of 1923. The station then passed on to the North Eastern Region of British Railways on nationalisation in 1948.

When Sectorisation was introduced in the 1980s, the station was served by Regional Railways until the Privatisation of British Railways.

== Facilities ==
The station is unstaffed and has very basic facilities (the station house is privately owned and all the other buildings have been demolished, leaving only waiting shelters on each platform). The platforms are staggered, either side of a half-barrier level crossing and each has level access from the road. No ticket machine is provided, so passengers must buy tickets in advance or on the train.

== Services ==
The station has a limited service compared with others on the route due to the rural nature of the area it serves - in the May 2025 timetable, six northbound (all to Bridlington) and five southbound services (to Hull and York) call on Mondays to Saturdays.

On Sundays, there is just one northbound train that calls at 08:53 (to Scarborough), along with two southbound trains. The first is a through service to Sheffield at 10:11 and the second is to Hull at 18:50. Arram is known as a "ghost station" due to the small number of passengers using it annually (only 598 in the year ending March 2023).

== Routes ==
Preceding station	National Rail	Following station
Beverley	Northern Yorkshire Coast Line	Hutton Cranswick
Historical railways
Beverley	Y&NMR Hull and Scarborough Line	Lockington Station closed; Line open
