= Armley Moor railway station =

Disused railway station in West Yorkshire, England

Armley Moor
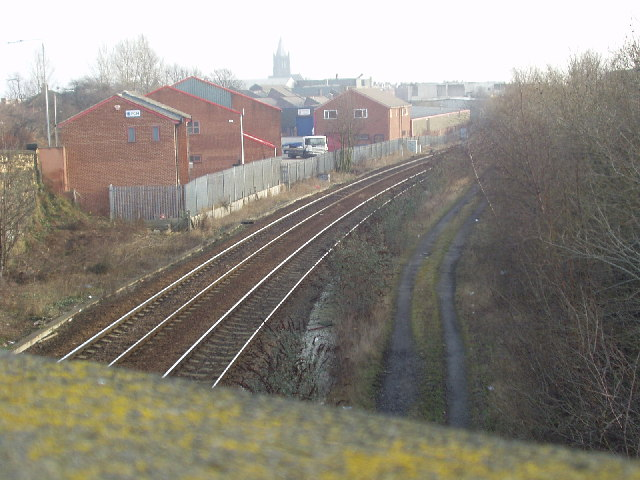
- Site of Armley Moor railway station in 2006

General information
- Location: Armley, City of Leeds; England
- Coordinates: 53.7950°N 1.5958°W
- Grid reference: SE267332
- Platforms: 2

Other information
- Status: Disused

History
- Original company: Leeds, Bradford and Halifax Junction Railway
- Pre-grouping: Great Northern Railway
- Post-grouping: London and North Eastern Railway

Key dates
- 1 August 1854: Station opens as Armley and Wortley
- 25 September 1950: Station renamed Armley Moor
- 4 July 1966: Station closes
Location

Armley Moor railway station was a station on the former Great Northern Railway between Leeds and Bramley. The location was between Carr Crofts and Wortley Road bridges, accessed via Station Road.

It served the Leeds suburb of Armley in West Yorkshire, England until closure in July 1966 due to the Beeching Axe. The station was immortalised in 1964 in the song "Slow Train" by Flanders and Swann.

== History ==
Opened by the Leeds, Bradford and Halifax Junction Railway, then absorbed by the Great Northern Railway, it became part of the London and North Eastern Railway during the Grouping of 1923. The station then passed on to the Eastern Region of British Railways on nationalisation in 1948 and was then closed by the British Railways Board.

== The site today ==
Trains still pass the site on what is now known as the Caldervale Line, but all of the structures (platforms & buildings) have been demolished.

| Preceding station | Disused railways | Following station |
|---|---|---|
| Bramley | London and North Eastern Railway; Great Northern Railway | Holbeck (high level) |
| Bramley | London and North Eastern Railway; Great Northern Railway | Beeston |
