= Listed buildings in Hensall, North Yorkshire =

Hensall is a civil parish in the county of North Yorkshire, England. It contains five listed buildings that are recorded in the National Heritage List for England. Of these, two are at Grade II*, the middle of the three grades, and the others are at Grade II, the lowest grade. The parish contains the village of Hensall and the surrounding area, and the listed buildings consist of a church, its former vicarage, a school and master's house, another house, and a railway signal box.

== Key ==
Grade	Criteria
II*	Particularly important buildings of more than special interest
II	Buildings of national importance and special interest

== Buildings ==
Name and location	Photograph	Date	Notes	Grade
Hensall House; 53.70326°N 1.10130°W		Late 18th century	The house is in pinkish-red brick, with a dentilled eaves cornice, and a grey slate roof with a stone ridge and coping, and tumbled-in brick work in the gable ends. There are two storeys, an L-shaped plan, and a front range of three bays. In the centre is a porch, and a doorway with a fanlight under a segmental arch. The windows are sashes, those in the ground floor with segmental arches, and in the upper floor with elliptical arches.	II
St Paul's Church; 53.69659°N 1.11861°W		1853–54	The church, designed by William Butterfield, is built in pinkish-red brick with stone dressings and a grey slate roof. It consists of a nave, narrow north and south aisles, a southwest porch, a chancel with a south chapel and a north vestry, and a northwest tower. The tower has a doorway with a pointed arch, a gabled stair turret, slit windows, two-light bell openings, a cogged eaves band, and a pyramidal roof.	II*
School and master's house 53.69618°N 1.11871°W		1854	The school and schoolmaster's house, which were designed by William Butterfield, have been extended. They are in pinkish-red brick, partly rendered, and have a grey slate roof. The house has two storeys and two bays, and contains a mullioned window and a tripartite window, both in a long raking dormer. The schoolroom has a single storey and two bays, and contains three casement windows and two dormers.	II
The Red House; 53.69627°N 1.11929°W	—	1854	A vicarage, later a private house, designed by William Butterfield, it is in pinkish-brown brick with a grey slate roof. There are two storeys, three bays, and a single-story rear range. The doorway has a pointed fanlight under a pointed arch. The windows are sashes, some tripartite, those in the ground floor under header arches and pointed relieving arches, and there is a half-hipped roof dormer.	II*
Signal box 53.69842°N 1.11507°W		1875	The signal box, designed and built by E S Yardley and Company, is in red brick with a hipped Welsh slate roof. There is a rectangular plan and two storeys, much of the upper storey with continuous glazing. The doorway is at the east end and is approached by steel steps. In the ground floor are two windows under red brick segmental arches with black headers.	II
