= Rawcliffe, East Riding of Yorkshire =

Village and civil parish in the East Riding of Yorkshire, England

Coordinates: 53.699718°N 0.965053°W

Rawcliffe
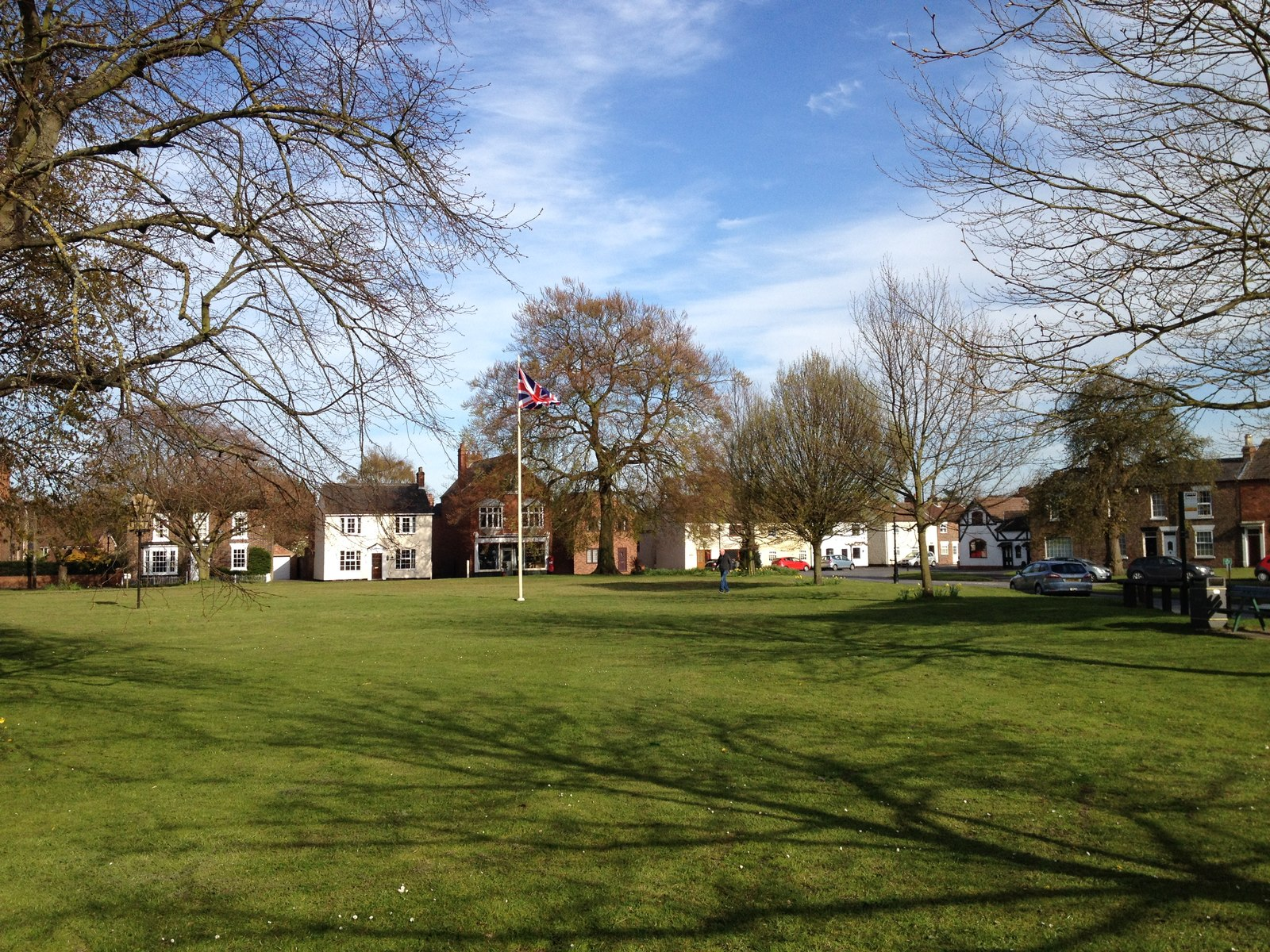
- The Green, Rawcliffe

- Location within the East Riding of Yorkshire
- Population: 2,379 (2011 census)
- OS grid reference: SE684230
- Civil parish: Rawcliffe
- Unitary authority: East Riding of Yorkshire
- Ceremonial county: East Riding of Yorkshire
- Region: Yorkshire and the Humber
- Country: England
- Sovereign state: United Kingdom
- Post town: GOOLE
- Postcode district: DN14
- Dialling code: 01405
- Police: Humberside
- Fire: Humberside
- Ambulance: Yorkshire
- UK Parliament: Goole and Pocklington

Rawcliffe (or Rawcliffe in Snaith) is a village and civil parish in the East Riding of Yorkshire, England on the border with North Yorkshire. It is situated approximately 4 miles (6.4 km) west of Goole and 17 miles (27 km) south of York. It lies on the banks of the River Aire just north of the M62 and on the A614 road. Rawcliffe, along with nearby Airmyn, was the location of one of the first reliable reports of the practice of warping in agriculture in the 1730s.

== Overview ==
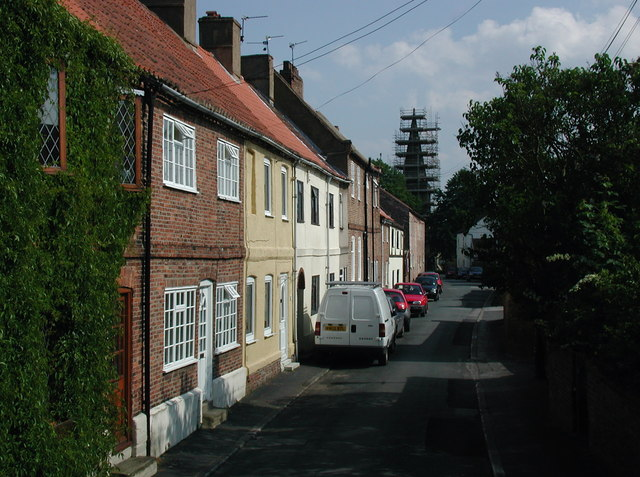
Chapel Lane, Rawcliffe

The name Rawcliffe derives from the Old Norse rauðrklif meaning 'red cliff'.

The civil parish is formed by the village of Rawcliffe and the hamlet of Rawcliffe Bridge which lies just to the south-east of the village. According to the 2011 UK census, Rawcliffe parish had a population of 2,379, an increase on the 2001 UK census figure of 2,087.

The village is served by a railway station on the Pontefract Line railway, originally part of the Lancashire and Yorkshire Railway route to nearby Goole.

The parish was part of the Goole Rural District in the West Riding of Yorkshire from 1894 to 1974, then in Boothferry district of Humberside until 1996.

The Anglican St James' Church, Rawcliffe was designated a Grade II listed building in 1986.

A 20 acres (8 ha) Local Nature Reserve, Sugar Mill Ponds, has been created on the site of an old sugar factory at Rawcliffe Bridge.

== See also ==
- Listed buildings in Rawcliffe, East Riding of Yorkshire

== Gallery ==
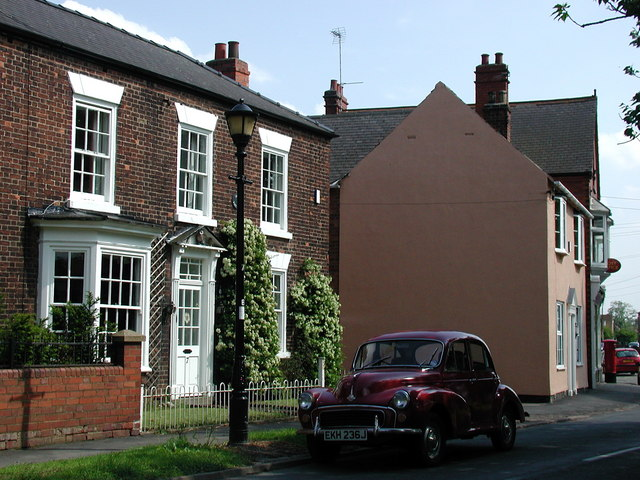
House on The Green

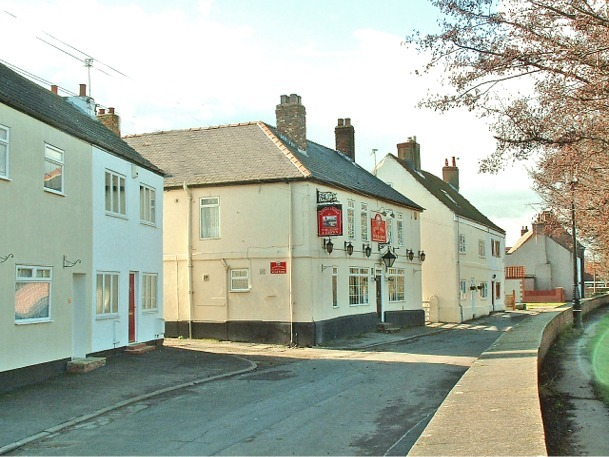
Jemmy Hirst at the Rose and Crown

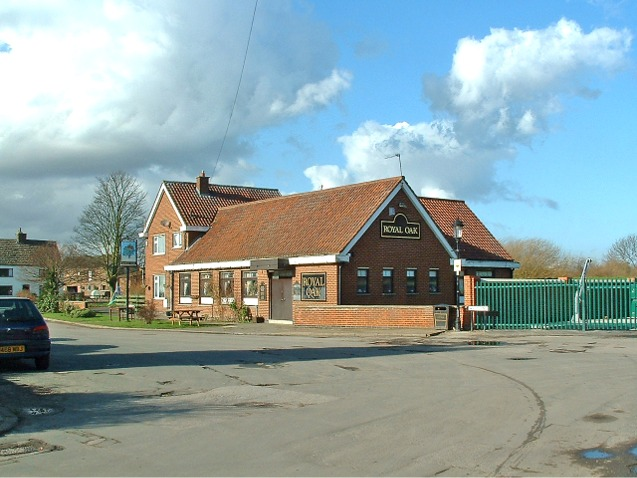
The Royal Oak

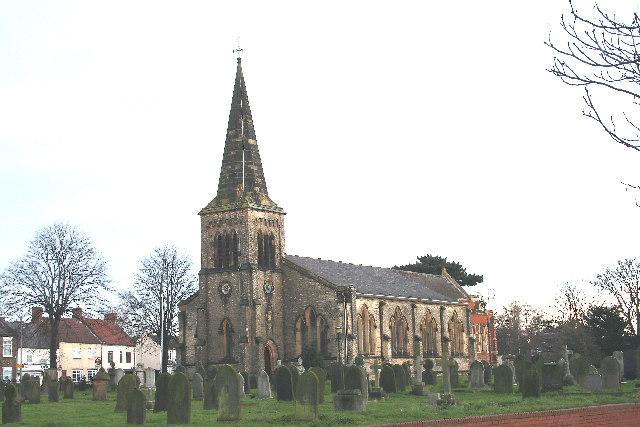
St James' Church, Rawcliffe
