= Slow Train (Flanders and Swann song) =

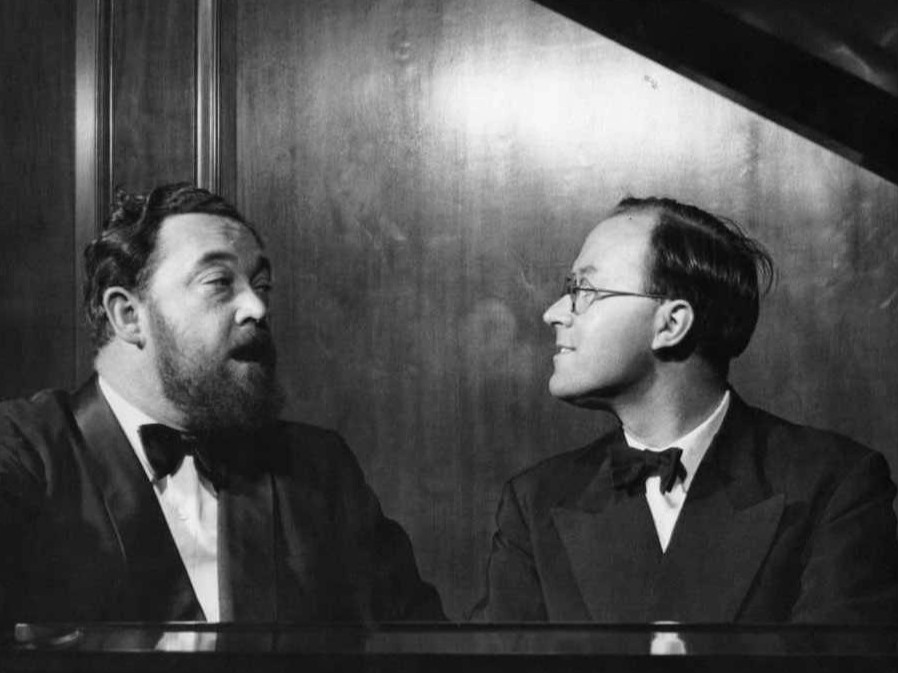
- Flanders and Swann in 1959

Song by Flanders and Swann
- Written: 1963
- Genre: List song; Train song
- Composer: Donald Swann
- Lyricist: Michael Flanders

Official audio
- "Slow Train" on YouTube

"Slow Train" is a song by British duo Flanders and Swann, written in July 1963. It laments the closure of railway stations and lines brought about by the Beeching cuts in the 1960s, and also the passing of a way of life. Written by Swann in F Major, its slow 6/8 rhythm evokes a steam train slowing and finally stopping.

Swann recalls in his preface to The Songs of Michael Flanders & Donald Swann that he originally assumed it was in 4/4 time and that it was only in 1977 when Gordon Langford made his arrangement for the King's Singers he realised "that the train runs in 6/8...and the train rolled for the first time evenly over its sleepers".

== Lyrics ==
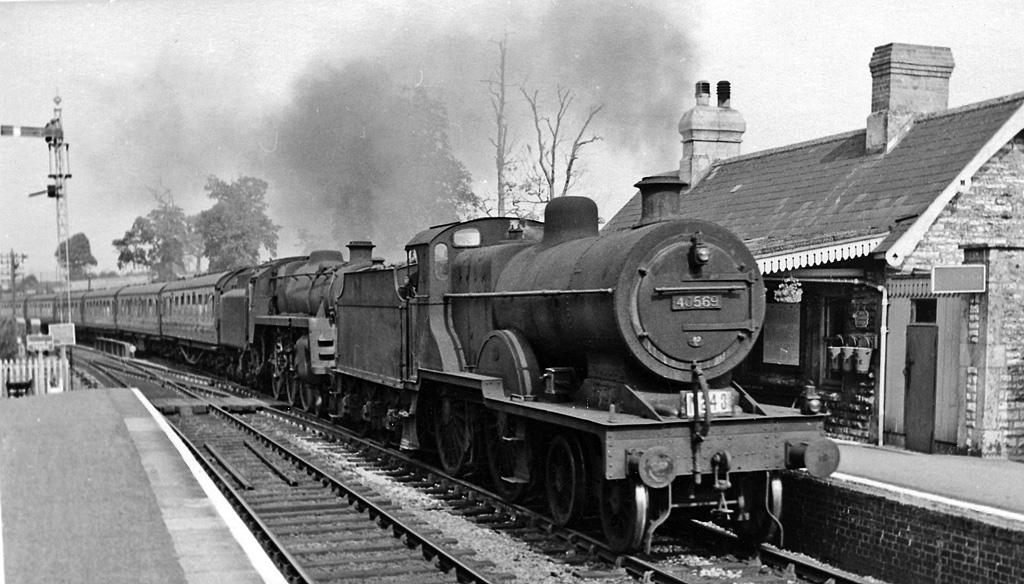
Midsomer Norton, a typical country station, whose closure was lamented by the song "Slow Train".

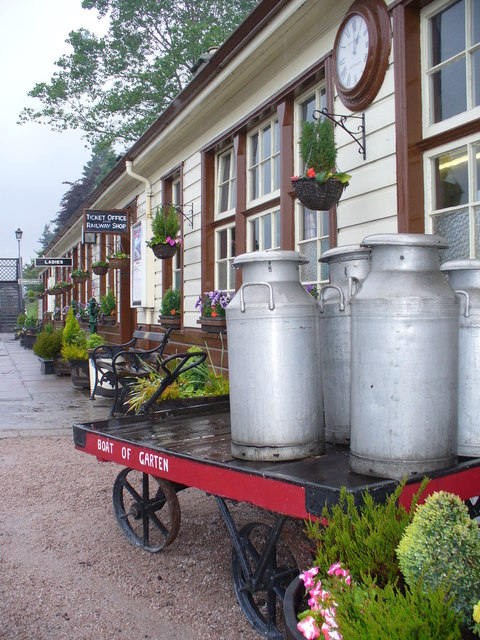
The song features idealised scenes such as milk churns on a railway platform.

"Slow Train" takes the form of an elegiac list song of railway stations, which has been likened to a litany. The song is introduced by lyricist Michael Flanders in the recording of At the Drop of Another Hat recorded live at the Haymarket Theatre on 2 October 1963 thus:

Unusual song this for us perhaps, as it's really quite a serious song and it was suggested by all those marvellous old local railway stations with their wonderful evocative names, all due to be axed and done away with one-by-one.

Its evocation of quiet, rural stations is highly romanticised and uses imagery such as the presence of a station cat or milk churns on a platform to express a "less hurried way of life" that is about to vanish:

No churns, no porter, no cat on a seat,
At Chorlton-cum-Hardy or Chester-le-Street.

The appeal of "Slow Train" is considered to lie in its list of "achingly bucolic" names of rural halts. The nostalgically poetic tone of Flanders's lyrics has been likened to Edward Thomas's 1914 poem "Adlestrop", which wistfully evokes a fleeting scene of Adlestrop railway station in Gloucestershire.

== Stations named in the lyrics ==
Although most of the stations mentioned in Flanders's song were earmarked for closure under the Beeching cuts, a number of the stations were ultimately spared closure: Chester-le-Street, Formby, Ambergate and Arram stations all remain open, and Gorton and Openshaw also survives, now renamed Gorton. Selby and Goole stations were not threatened by Beeching, though the line "from Selby to Goole" mentioned in the song was closed to passengers. The other line mentioned, "from St Erth to St Ives" in Cornwall stayed open. (Note: While St Ives in Cornwall was the one to which Flanders is referring, another station named St. Ives, on the Great Eastern Railway between Cambridge and Huntingdon, was closed in 1970.)

Some stations referred to in the song have since been re-opened, notably Chorlton-cum-Hardy. It had closed in January 1967, but re-opened in July 2011 as Chorlton tram stop on the Manchester Metrolink network.

As of 2012, ten of the 31 stations mentioned were open, with five other closed stations located on lines that were still open.

The song mentions two stations that have never existed, treating Formby Four Crosses and Armley Moor Arram as station names. Leon Berger, archivist of the estate of Donald Swann, has said that Flanders had used an alphabetical list of stations that had been published in The Guardian, and this was the source of some of the discrepancies between the names in the songs and the historic names of the stations. Flanders mistakenly combined two pairs of consecutive names from this list, namely those of Formby, Four Crosses, Armley Moor and Arram.

=== List of stations ===
Below are listed the stations named in "Slow Train", in the order that they appear in the lyrics. Where appropriate, the correct name of the station is shown in brackets.

Station	Railway	Between	Coordinates	Grid reference	Opened	Closed
Millers Dale for Tideswell (Millers Dale)	Midland Railway	Buxton and Matlock	53.2561°N 1.7948°W	SK135733	1863	1967
Kirby Muxloe	Midland Railway	Leicester and Burton upon Trent	52.627°N 1.232°W	SK521035	1848	1964 (Note: Kirby Muxloe is closed but lies on the Ivanhoe line, which remains open for freight only. Re-opening of the station has been deemed unlikely.)
Mow Cop and Scholar Green	North Staffordshire Railway	Stoke-on-Trent and Congleton	53.11844°N 2.23537°W	SJ844580	1848	1964
Blandford Forum	Somerset & Dorset Joint Railway	Templecombe and Broadstone Junction	50.85970°N 2.16050°W	ST888067	1863	1966
Mortehoe (Mortehoe and Woolacombe)	London and South Western Railway	Barnstaple and Ilfracombe	51.173232°N 4.169598°W	SS483438	1874	1970
Midsomer Norton	Somerset & Dorset Joint Railway	Bath Green Park and Shepton Mallet	51.281°N 2.483°W	ST664537	1874	1966
Mumby Road	Great Northern Railway	Willoughby and Mablethorpe	53.25447°N 0.24017°E	TF494754	1888	1970
Chorlton-cum-Hardy	Cheshire Lines Committee joint railway	Manchester Central and Stockport Tiviot Dale	53.444°N 2.273°W	SJ818942	1880	1967 (Note: Re-opened in July 2011 as Chorlton, on Manchester Metrolink.)
Chester-le-Street	North Eastern Railway	Durham and Newcastle	54.855°N 1.578°W	NZ271512	1868	Remains open
Littleton Badsey (Littleton and Badsey)	Great Western Railway	Evesham and Honeybourne	52.1024°N 1.8934°W	SP073448	1853	1966 (Note: Littleton and Badsey, Chittening Platform and Armley Moor stations are all closed stations on lines that are still open. Chittening and Armley have been proposed for re-opening.)
Openshaw (Gorton and Openshaw)	Great Central Railway	Manchester London Road and Guide Bridge	53.469007°N 2.167942°W	SJ889969	1906	Remains open
Long Stanton	Great Eastern Railway	Cambridge and Huntingdon	52.2932°N 0.0496°E	TL399680	1847	1970
Formby	Lancashire and Yorkshire Railway	Liverpool Exchange and Southport	53.5535°N 3.0708°W	SD291069	1848	Remains open
Four Crosses	Cambrian Railways	Oswestry and Buttington	52.757528°N 3.082023°W	SJ270183	1860	1965
Dunstable Town	Great Northern Railway and London & North Western Railway joint line	Hatfield and Leighton Buzzard	51.8866°N 0.5106°W	TL024219	1860	1965
Dogdyke	Great Northern Railway	Boston and Lincoln	53.08285°N 0.19580°W	TF210554	1849	1963
Tumby Woodside	Great Northern Railway	Firsby and Lincoln	53.10229°N 0.10452°W	TF270578	1913	1970
Trouble House Halt	British Railways	Kemble and Tetbury	51.656870°N 2.124995°W	ST914953	1959 (Note: Trouble House Halt opened in 1959, shortly before Beeching became BR chairman, and closed soon after.)	1964
Audlem	Great Western Railway	Market Drayton and Nantwich	52.98300°N 2.51680°W	SJ653430	1863	1963
Ambergate	Midland Railway	Derby and Chesterfield/Matlock	53.061°N 1.481°W	SK348516	1840	Remains open on the Matlock branch
Chittening Platform	Great Western Railway	Filton and Avonmouth	51.525°N 2.675°W	ST535813	1917	1964
Cheslyn Hay (Wyrley and Cheslyn Hay)	London and North Western Railway	Walsall and Rugeley Town	52.66633°N 2.02438°W	SJ983076	1858	1965 (Note: The line through Cheslyn Hay remained open for frieght, and re-opened to passengers in 1989. Cheslyn Hay remained closed, and was replaced by a new Landywood station, half a mile (0.80 km) to the south.)
Selby	North Eastern Railway	Doncaster and York	53.783000°N 1.063440°W	SE618322	1834	Remains open (Note: Both Selby and Goole remain open, but the line between them, referred to in the song, closed in 1964.)
Goole	North Eastern Railway	Doncaster and Hull	53.705124°N 0.872000°W	SE744237	1869	Remains open
St Erth	Great Western Railway	Truro and Penzance	50.170767°N 5.443686°W	SW541357	1852	Remains open
St Ives	Great Western Railway	Terminus of the branch from St Erth	50.209265°N 5.477691°W	SW519401	1877	Remains open
Cockermouth for Buttermere (Cockermouth)	London and North Western Railway	Workington and Keswick	54.660096°N 3.366355°W	NY119303	1865	1966
Armley Moor	Great Northern Railway	Leeds and Bramley	53.7950°N 1.5958°W	SE267332	1854	1966
Arram	North Eastern Railway	Driffield and Beverley	53.884000°N 0.425000°W	TA035442	1853	Remains open
Pye Hill and Somercotes	Great Northern Railway	Kimberley and Pinxton	53.069900°N 1.340934°W	SK442527	1877	1963
Windmill End	Great Western Railway	Dudley and Old Hill	52.49079°N 2.06873°W	SO957874	1878	1964

=== Map of stations ===
Locations mentioned in the lyrics of Slow Train by Flanders and Swann

== Other versions ==
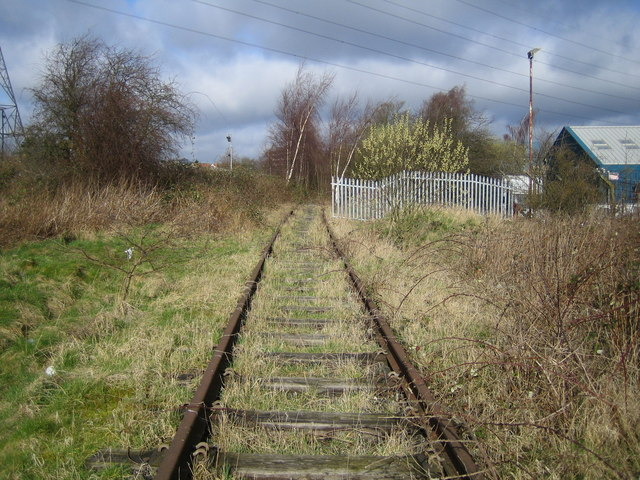
"On the mainline and the goods siding the grass grows high": the Beeching cuts closed many rural lines, such as the Dunstable Branch Lines serving Dunstable Town.

Gordon Langford arranged the song for six voices for The King's Singers and it appeared on their 1977 album Flanders and Swann and Noël Coward. Langford, a railway enthusiast, put a handwritten note on the score saying "Effigies of Dr Beeching (complete with box of pins) available upon request".

In 2004, Canadian classical quartet Quartetto Gelato released a themed album called Quartetto Gelato Travels the Orient Express, celebrating the original journey of Orient Express and featuring music from London to Istanbul. The album begins with a rendition of "Slow Train", with the final lines changed to reflect the route of the Orient Express.

A version of "The Slow Train" by the King's Singers is on electronica duo Lemon Jelly's track "'76 aka The Slow Train", combined with a cover of the Albert Hammond song "I'm a Train" also performed by the King's Singers. A live version by Stackridge was included in their 2009 DVD 4x4.

Michael Williams' book On the Slow Train takes its name from the song. It celebrates twelve of the most beautiful and historic journeys in Britain that were saved from the Beeching cuts, including famous routes such as the Settle–Carlisle line and less well-known pleasures, such as the four-hour Lancaster–Carlisle route along the remote Cumbrian coastline.

English punk and folk singer-songwriter Frank Turner included a version of the song on his 2011 compilation album The Second Three Years.

== See also ==
- Abandoned railway station
- List of closed railway stations in Britain
- List of train songs

== Bibliography ==
- British Railways Pre-grouping Atlas and Gazetteer. Ian Allan. 1988. ISBN 0-7110-0320-3.
- Dewick, Tony. Rail Atlas 1890.
- Jowett, Alan (1989). Jowett's Railway Atlas of Great Britain & Ireland. Patrick Stephens Ltd. ISBN 1-85260-086-1.
