= Hensall, North Yorkshire =

Village and civil parish in North Yorkshire, England

Coordinates: 53°42′13″N 1°06′17″W

Hensall
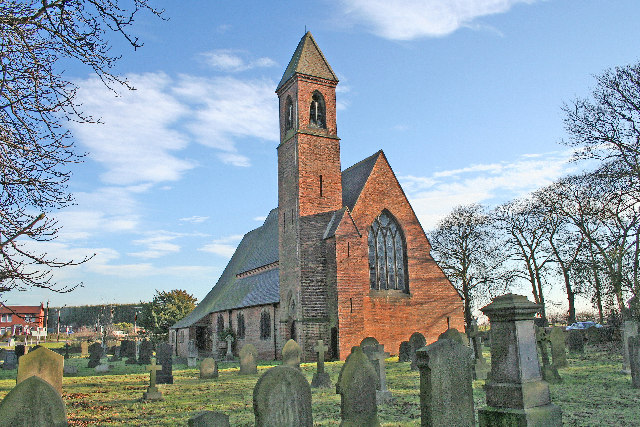
- St Paul's Church, Hensall

- Location within North Yorkshire
- Population: 852 (2011 census)
- OS grid reference: SE591234
- Civil parish: Hensall
- Unitary authority: North Yorkshire
- Ceremonial county: North Yorkshire
- Region: Yorkshire and the Humber
- Country: England
- Sovereign state: United Kingdom
- Post town: GOOLE
- Postcode district: DN14
- Dialling code: 01977
- Police: North Yorkshire
- Fire: North Yorkshire
- Ambulance: Yorkshire
- UK Parliament: Selby

Hensall is a village and civil parish in the English county of North Yorkshire.

== History ==
Hensall can trace its roots back at least as far as the 1086 Domesday Book, in which it is listed as Edeshale. The name of Edeshale is said to derive from Aedan's, or Edan's, Nook of land.

The largest building in the village is the Anglican St Paul's Church, Hensall, which was commissioned by the Viscount Downe in 1843, and is now grade II* listed, as is its former vicarage, The Red House.

For most of its history the people of Hensall were employed in agricultural industries, with some cottage industries also present. Today the village is largely a dormitory settlement, with inhabitants commuting to nearby towns and cities for work; however, there are a number of light industries based in Hensall.

== Geography ==
=== Location ===
The village of Hensall is located just south of the River Aire, and lies in an area known as the Humberhead Levels. The Levels cover a large area, and are characterised by flat, low-lying land, formed at the end on the Ice Age.

Due to its proximity to a river, and the flat land it occupies, Hensall has long been suited to arable farming. Having once been home to several farms only a few remain in the village today, and though some livestock is kept, crops are the main agricultural output.

Hensall lies on rich sand deposits, which have in the past been quarried. As a result of the quarrying a number of former quarries puncture the otherwise flat landscape. In recent years these have become important habitats for wildlife, and are home to species such as sand martins, buzzards and marsh orchids.

During the Autumn 2000 UK Floods the village was affected by flooding from the River Aire, though was spared the worst of the flooding that affected the neighbouring village of Gowdall, two miles away. Following the flooding in 2000 flood defenses in the area were dramatically improved, and defended the village when they were put to their first major test, during flooding over the winter of 2015.

=== Layout ===
Hensall is a detached village, meaning that as well as the principal settlement there are a number of separate areas to the community. The core of the village is built around Main Street, while three outlying parts of Hensall are separated from the centre by farmland.

As the name suggests, Main Street is the principle thoroughfare of Hensall. With Field Lane and Finkle Street, Main Street forms a loop that makes up the village core. The area contains a number of the village's amenities including the Post Office (which also acts as the village store), the Methodist Church and the local Italian restaurant; La Anchor. Several other residential streets are connected to this part of the village. One of these streets, Bird Lane, leads to a sports field, home of Hensall's cricket and football clubs. Adjacent to the cricket pavilion is one of the village's two playgrounds.

Station Road acts as a corridor connecting the heart of the village to Weeland Road. Weeland Road is the main road in and out of the village. A number of homes can be found along Station Road, as well as Hensall Station, and the village pub; the Railway Tavern. Station Road is also home to the village's other playground. Where Station Road meets Weeland Road there is a crossroads, from which Church Lane emerges on the other side. Church Lane connects Hensall to the neighbouring village of Great Heck, which is a mile to the south. Church Lane is home to its namesake, St. Paul's Church, and the village school.

Main Street becomes Wand Lane as it exits the core part of Hensall to the north-west. About a quarter of a mile along the route is Dene Close, a collection of post-war homes, built in the 1950s.

Half a mile west along Weeland Road from the Station Road crossroads is a small collection of homes in an area known as Eggborough Ings. The homes in this area connect with Wand Lane to the north, and the core part of the village, via Hazel Old Lane.

== Governance ==
Hensall was historically part of the West Riding of Yorkshire. From 1938 to 1974 the village was part of the Osgoldcross Rural District. Following the Local Government Act 1972 Hensall became part of the ceremonial, and non-metropolitan, county of North Yorkshire. The same act saw local administration transferred to the District of Selby. In 2023 Selby district was abolished and the village is now administered by North Yorkshire Council.

Hensall is in the UK parliamentary seat of Selby.

North Yorkshire Police serve the village from their local base in Selby.

== Transport ==
By road Hensall lies on the A645, which is known as Weeland Road in the village. The A645 connects with the A19 a mile west of Hensall, providing connections to Selby and York to the north, and Doncaster to the south. The A19 connects with Junction 34 of the M62 just south-west of the village, providing good connections to Goole and Kingston upon Hull to the east, and Leeds, Pontefract and Wakefield to the west.

In December 1973 a service area nearby on the M62 was proposed, of 40 acres. There would be a transport cafe, with a separate cafeteria on each side. It would cost £700,000.

By rail Hensall is located on the Pontefract Line of the West Yorkshire Metro. From Monday to Saturday the village is served by three trains a day, with one train terminating in Goole, and two trains terminating in Leeds. The East Coast Main Line (that connects Edinburgh to London) passes Hensall just a quarter of a mile east of the village, though the nearest stations to Hensall on that line are at Doncaster, which is sixteen miles south of the village, and York, twenty one miles to the north.

By bus Hensall has a limited service, operated by Arriva Yorkshire. There are a number of bus stops placed in the village along a route that goes from Selby to Wakefield, and back, between Monday and Saturday.

== Amenities ==
For a village of its size Hensall is served by a relatively good number of community amenities and services.

Hensall Community Primary School takes children from the age of four to eleven. The Snaith School offers secondary education to children aged eleven to sixteen, and is located just four miles away. The Snaith School is connected to the village by a purpose run bus. There are two children's playgrounds in the village.

Hensall is also served by a post office, which doubles as the village store.

The flat landscape and numerous country lanes around Hensall lend themselves to cycling, there are also a number of public footpaths around the village. Hensall is home to both a cricket club and a football club.

The Anglican St. Paul's Church, and a Methodist church, can both be found in the village.

== Hensall on screen ==
On 20 January 2015 Hensall was featured on the popular BBC television show Great British Railway Journeys. The programme is presented by former MP Michael Portillo. During the episode "Boston to Hensall", during the sixth season of the show, Portillo boarded a Goole bound train at Knottingley Station and travelled on one of the least used passenger railway routes in the country, a so-called "Parliamentary Train". While he was in Hensall Portillo took a ride through the village on a road going steam engine.

In late 2018 filming took place on the outskirts of the village for the Universal Pictures film Fast & Furious Presents Hobbs & Shaw. Eggborough Power Station, the location of the shoot, and which borders the village, was able to be used as a location, having been decommissioned earlier that year.

During the 2019 UCI Road World Championships Hensall was one of the host towns and villages along two of the races. The two races to visit Hensall were staged on Friday 27 September 2019, and included the junior women's race and the under 23 men's race. The junior women's race was won by American cyclist Megan Jastrab. The men's under-23 race was won by the Italian Samuele Battistella, while Tom Pidcock, who is from Yorkshire, took the bronze. Both of these races took place on a course that began in Doncaster and finished in Harrogate, and both races were broadcast live on BBC Sport.

== Hensall, Canada ==
In 1851 two Hensall villagers, the brothers George and James Petty, founded the community of Hensall in the Canadian province of Ontario. The settlement is located in Huron County, and is roughly nine miles east Lake Huron, one of the Great Lakes.

== Notable people ==
- Anne Greaves (1889–1971), was the first woman to become a member of the Institute of Quarrying, and created artificial stone through her quarrying company.

== See also ==
- Listed buildings in Hensall, North Yorkshire
