= St James' Church, Rawcliffe =

Church in Yorkshire, England

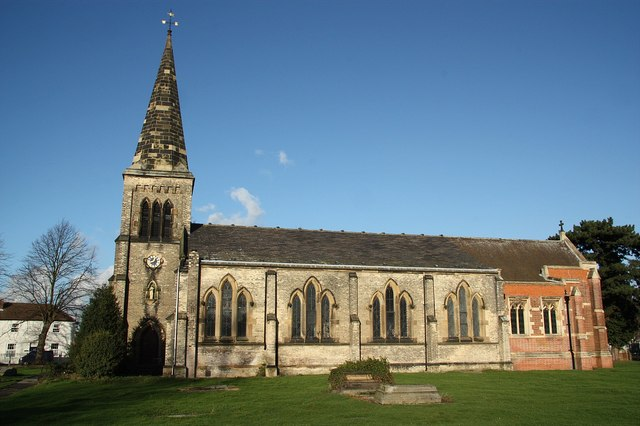
The church, in 2009

St James' Church is an Anglican church in Rawcliffe, East Riding of Yorkshire, a village in England.

Rawcliffe was long in the parish of Snaith Priory. By 1829, it had a chapel of ease, described as "small" and "neat". A new church was built in 1842, to a design by William Hurst and William Lambie Moffatt. The chancel and vestry were constructed between 1906 and 1908, to a design by Walter Brierley. The church was grade II listed in 1966.

The original part of the church is built in grey brick with sandstone dressings and a slate roof, and the chancel is in red brick with limestone dressings and a tile roof. The church consists of a nave, a chancel with a south chapel and a north organ chamber and vestry, and a west steeple. The steeple has a tower with two stages, angle buttresses, doorways with hood moulds, niches with statues, a west lancet window, clock faces, string courses, triple-lancet bell openings, and a corbel table. It is surmounted by an octagonal broach spire with a finial and a weathervane. Inside, there is a piscina, an octagonal font and an octagonal pulpit.

== See also ==
- Listed buildings in Rawcliffe, East Riding of Yorkshire
