= Institute of Quarrying =

International professional body

- Abbreviation: IQ
- Formation: 1917; 109 years ago
- Type: Professional body
- Legal status: Company limited by guarantee
- Purpose: Quarrying international professional association
- Headquarters: McPherson House, 8a Regan Way, Chetwynd Business Park, Chilwell, Nottingham NG9 6RZ
- Region served: Worldwide
- Members: Over 6,000 members in some 50 countries of the world
- Executive Director: Phil James
- Website: www.quarrying.org

The Institute of Quarrying is the international professional body for quarrying, construction materials and the related extractive and processing industries. The Institute's long-term objective is to promote progressive improvements in all aspects of operational performance of the extractives industry through education and training. The Institute has been supporting the extractives industry and associated sectors since 1917.

== History ==
The Institute was founded on 19 October 1917 from a meeting of “The Association of Quarry Managers” in Caernarfon in North Wales. Anne Greaves was the first woman to become a member of the Institute of Quarrying in 1925. Gradually expanding over the years, IQ now has affiliate organisations in Australia, New Zealand, Malaysia, Southern Africa and Hong Kong.

In September 2012 the Institute moved to its new premises at McPherson House, named after its founder Simon McPherson, in Chilwell, Nottingham.

== Structure ==
The largest membership group remains in the UK, where the Institute was founded in 1917. Australia constitutes the largest group in the Pacific region and close ties are maintained with their neighbours in New Zealand and Malaysia. To the north, members are based in Hong Kong, operating both in the territory and China. The Institute's activities in Southern Africa are centred on South Africa which provides support for members in other countries of the region.

=== UK ===
It has thirteen regional branches in the UK.

=== International ===
- The Institute of Quarrying Australia
- The Institute of Quarrying New Zealand
- The Institute of Quarrying Hong Kong
- The Institute of Quarrying Southern Africa
- The Institute of Quarrying Malaysia

== Function ==
It regulates the quarrying industry, providing training and consultation for standards in the industry, similar to other engineering professional bodies.

== Arms ==
Coat of arms of Institute of Quarrying

Crest
On a wreath Argent and Azure on top of a quarry face Proper a lion sejant erect Or the head and mane Gules supporting between the forelegs a key erect wards outwards Argent.
Escutcheon
Azure an octagonal tower of Caernarvon Castle with two turrets Proper on a chief Or between two quarryers' jads Sable a coronet composed of wattle flowers and trefoils alternately set upon a rim Vert.

== See also ==
- Mineral Products Association
- Quarry Products Training Council, on Crendon Street in High Wycombe, and at Gerrards Cross, formed in 1982, it became the Extractive, Processing and Industry Council. Its qualifications are now set by the Mineral Products Qualifications Council at the National Stone Centre in Wirksworth
