= Listed buildings in Brayton, North Yorkshire =

Brayton is a civil parish in the county of North Yorkshire, England. It contains five listed buildings that are recorded in the National Heritage List for England. Of these, one is listed at Grade I, the highest of the three grades, and the others are at Grade II, the lowest grade. The parish contains the village of Brayton and the surrounding area. The listed buildings consist of a church and its vicarage, a milestone, and a bridge and tunnel on the Selby Canal.

== Key ==
Grade	Criteria
I	Buildings of exceptional interest, sometimes considered to be internationally important
II	Buildings of national importance and special interest

== Buildings ==
Name and location	Photograph	Date	Notes	Grade
St Wilfrid's Church; 53.77185°N 1.08474°W		12th century	The church has been altered and extended during the centuries, including a restoration in 1877–78 by J. L. Pearson. It is built in magnesian limestone with a slate roof, and consists of a nave with a clerestory, north and south aisles, a south porch, a chancel, a north vestry, and a west steeple. The steeple has a tower with three stages, a string course, a frieze at impost level, a corbel table, and an embattled parapet. On the tower is an octagon with two-light bell openings, surmounted by a spire. The south doorway is Norman, and has four orders of arches with beakhead, medallion and chevron ornament and roll moulding, and three orders of decorated nook shafts.	I
Brayton Bridge; 53.76546°N 1.07574°W		Late 18th century	The bridge carries Brayton Lane over the Selby Canal. It is in stone and consists of a single segmental arch. The bridge has a band, a solid parapet and capping, and curved splayed ends with round piers at the ends.	II
Brayton Tunnel; 53.76084°N 1.08199°W		1778	The tunnel consists of a culvert carrying a stream under the Selby Canal, flanked by sumps to reduce the risk of flooding. It is built in limestone and gritstone, with some engineering brick, on timber foundations.	II
The Vicarage; 53.77237°N 1.08529°W	—	Early to mid 19th century	The vicarage is in reddish-brown mottled brick, rendered and whitewashed on the front, with stone dressings, and a hipped Welsh slate roof. There are two storeys and four bays. On the front is a trellis porch, and the windows are sashes.	II
Milestone; 53.76889°N 1.08848°W		19th century	The milestone on the northwest side of Doncaster Road (A19 road) consists of a stone about 1 metre (3 ft 3 in) high with a pointed head. It is inscribed with the distances to Doncaster, Askern, Selby and York.	II
