= Brayton, North Yorkshire =

Village and civil parish in North Yorkshire, England

Coordinates: 53.768231°N 1.090675°W

Brayton
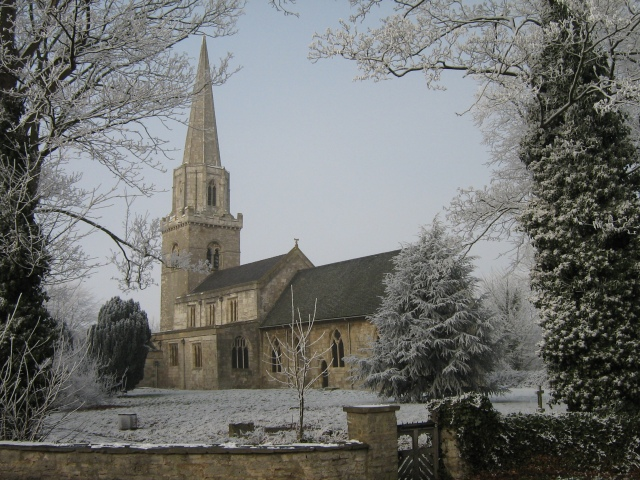
- St Wilfrid's Church, Brayton

- Location within North Yorkshire
- Population: 5,299 (2011 Census)
- OS grid reference: SE600305
  - London: 160 mi (260 km) S
- Civil parish: Brayton
- Unitary authority: North Yorkshire
- Ceremonial county: North Yorkshire
- Region: Yorkshire and the Humber
- Country: England
- Sovereign state: United Kingdom
- Post town: SELBY
- Postcode district: YO8
- Dialling code: 01757
- Police: North Yorkshire
- Fire: North Yorkshire
- Ambulance: Yorkshire
- UK Parliament: Selby

Brayton is a village and civil parish in North Yorkshire, England. The village is situated approximately 1 mile (1.6 km) south from Selby. The parish includes some of south-western Selby, as well as the village of Brayton.

The 2011 Census stated the population of the parish of Brayton to be 5,299, a decrease from 5,514 at the 2001 Census.

Brayton was part of the West Riding of Yorkshire until 1 April 1974. From 1974 to 2023 it was part of the Selby District. It is now administered by the unitary North Yorkshire Council.

The name Brayton either derives from the Old Norse breiðr meaning 'broad', or the personal name Breithi, and the Old English tūn meaning 'settlement'.

== Overview ==
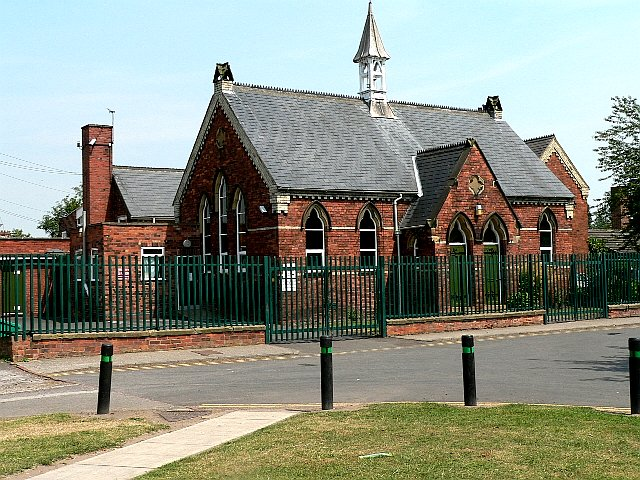
Brayton Church of England Infant School

Brayton is almost entirely residential with the exception of a few local shops, including a butchers and a post office.

Village schools are Brayton Academy, Brayton Juniors, and Brayton C of E Infants. The Infant School is one of the oldest buildings in the village. The school house was once home to the headmistress of Brayton school, and lessons were taken in a smaller building. The house is now a private residence, and the old school room is now a small part of the extended building.

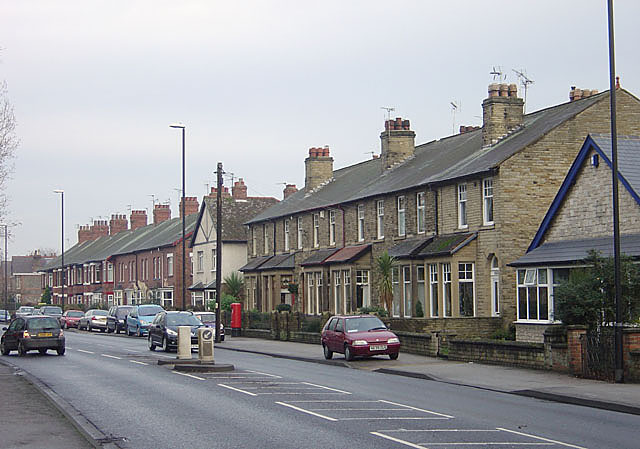
Doncaster Road, Brayton

Brayton Methodist Church and St Wilfrid's Church are the two religious buildings. The Methodist chapel was built in 1844, extended in 1961 and the 1961 extension re-developed in 1994. It is reputed that John Wesley, the founder of Methodism who travel widely throughout the country, preached on the original Village Green (the triangle adjacent to the chapel) but there is no documentary evidence to prove this. Being a small person, it is also reputed that he stood on a chair in order to be seen. That chair (?) with an appropriate plaque has been the pulpit chair in the chapel since the chapel was built.

The Grade I listed Church of England parish church, dedicated to St Wilfrid, dates from the 12th to the 15th centuries with 19th-century alterations and stained glass. Within the church is a tomb to Lord D'Arcy (died 1558), and his wife, its effigies damaged during the 17th-century Interregnum.

== Governance ==
An electoral ward in the same name exists. This ward stretches to Barlow with a total population of 6,052.

== See also ==
- Listed buildings in Brayton, North Yorkshire
