= Brayton Academy =

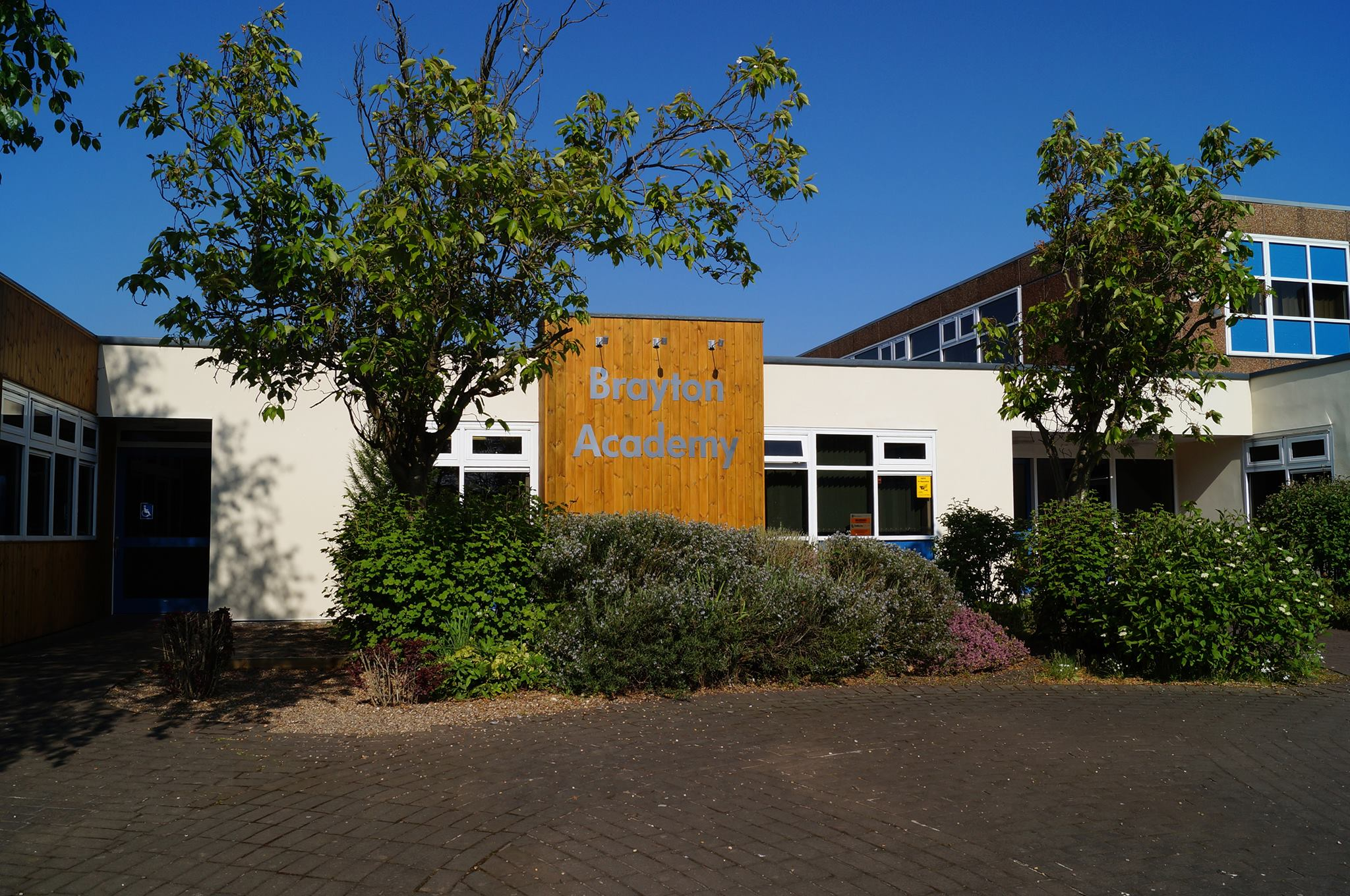
- Brayton Academy in 2018

Location
- Doncaster Road; Brayton; Selby, North Yorkshire, YO8 9QS; England; 53.774270°N 1.083780°W

Information
- Type: Academy
- Established: 1979
- Local authority: North Yorkshire
- Department for Education URN: 143138 Tables
- Ofsted: Reports
- Principal: Paul Carney
- Age: 11 to 16
- Enrolment: 500
- Website: https://www.braytonacademy.org.uk/

Brayton Academy, formerly Brayton High School (previously to that, Brayton College) is a medium-sized high school located in Brayton (near Selby) North Yorkshire, England. The school provides for approximately 590 pupils ages 11 to 16, while being able to accommodate up to 1,280.

The school is located within the parish boundaries of Brayton, although its catchment area also covers other local villages and extends into parts of Selby.

Brayton High School opened in 1979 and was awarded Technology College status in 2001. It was renamed Brayton College in line with the Technology specialism, but in 2009 reverted to its original name and a new uniform. The school was re-designated as a lead specialist technology school in the Selby area again in 2009.

The school joined the Rodillian Multi Academy Trust in 2016, being re-named as Brayton Academy after it was found to fail its students (based on exam results).

In the school's first Ofsted Inspection since joining the Rodillian Multi Academy Trust it was graded as 'Outstanding' in all areas by Ofsted when inspected in June 2019.This was the first time the school sited here has ever been granted outstanding, reflecting the improvements that were significantly lacking since its first opening.

One subject the school focuses on in KS3 is resilience, having 5 resilience lessons a week in y7 and 3 ‘applied resilience’ lessons, a chance to try something new, like animation, gardening, skiing or golf for example, in y8 and y9
