= Listed buildings in Rawcliffe, East Riding of Yorkshire =

Rawcliffe is a civil parish in the county of the East Riding of Yorkshire, England. It contains ten listed buildings that are recorded in the National Heritage List for England. All the listed buildings are designated at Grade II, the lowest of the three grades, which is applied to "buildings of national importance and special interest". The parish contains the village of Rawcliffe and the surrounding countryside. Most of the listed buildings are houses and farmhouses, and the others consist of a bridge, a monumental arch, a church and war memorial.

== Buildings ==
Name and location	Photograph	Date	Notes
1 and 2 Post Office Row; 53.69837°N 0.96861°W		Mid to late 17th century	A house, later divided into two, in red brick, rendered on the left return, on a stepped plinth, with a floor band, a modillion brick eaves cornice, and a tile roof with raised verges and brick coped gables. There are two storeys, five bays divided by pilasters, and a left outshut. On the front is a doorway under a soldier arch, a blocked doorway, and a post box, and the windows are casements.
110 and 112 High Street; 53.69863°N 0.96839°W		c. 1700	A house, later divided into two, in red brick, rendered on the front, on a plinth, with a floor band, corbelled eaves, and a pantile roof with raised brick coped gables. There are two storeys and three bays. On the front are two doorways, and the windows are casements.
Field House Farmhouse; 53.69198°N 0.96105°W	—	Late 17th to early 18th century	A farmhouse that was later extended and divided into two houses. The earlier part is in brown brick, the later part is in red brick with yellow brick dressings, the roof is in Welsh slate, and there are two storeys. It consists of a north range with a lean-to containing an entrance, and a south range with a projecting porch. The north range has three bays, and a single-storey extension to the right. There is a stepped and cogged brick eaves cornice, and moulded stone coping to the right gable. In the centre of each floor is a Venetian window, and the outer bays contain sash windows, some horizontally sliding. The south front has three bays, the middle bay projecting as a two-storey pedimented porch, on a plinth, with quoins. The entrance has a yellow brick surround, an incised stucco cambered arch, a fanlight and sidelights. The windows are sashes under rubbed brick flat arches.
45 and 47 The Green; 53.69828°N 0.96300°W	—	Early 18th century	A house, later divided into two, in rendered brick, with a moulded plinth on the left, a modillion brick eaves cornice, and a pantile roof with stone coped gables. There are two storeys and three bays. On the front are two doorways, the windows are sashes, and all the openings have channelled wedge lintels with fluted keystones.
15–19 High Street; 53.69799°N 0.96642°W	—	Early to mid 18th century	A row of three houses in brown brick, with a floor band, a stepped and cogged brick eaves cornice, and a pantile roof with tumbled-in brick to the raised right gable. There are two storeys and attics, and three bays. On the front are three doorways under segmental brick arches. The windows are sashes, those on the lower floor under segmental brick arches, and on the upper floor with flat brick arches.
Turn Bridge; 53.68539°N 0.98967°W	—	18th century	The bridge carries the A1041 road over the Old River Don. It is in sandstone, and consists of three arches with splayed-out abutments. The central arch is round and rusticated with a keystone. There is a band at the original road level, and a coped parapet between cylindrical piers with square bases, a raised band and domed caps.
Hirst Farmhouse; 53.69995°N 0.96523°W	—	Mid to late 18th century	The farmhouse is in brown brick, with a floor band and a Welsh slate roof. There are two storeys, a double depth plan, and three bays. The doorway has pilasters, an entablature, a fanlight and a hood. Above it is a blind panel, and the windows are casements under rubbed brick segmental arches with keystones.
Monumental arch 53.69932°N 0.95998°W	—	Late 18th to early 19th century	The arch stands over a pathway to a former walled garden. It is in sandstone and in Classical style. It consists of a Doric arch with paired columns, the outer square and the inner round, on pedestals, carrying an entablature with a plain frieze, a cornice and a blocking course. On the returns are single round columns. The arch is about 5 metres (16 ft) in height, 5 metres (16 ft) in width, and 1 metre (3 ft 3 in) in depth.
St James' Church; 53.69864°N 0.96398°W		1841–42	The chancel, designed by Walter Brierley, was added in 1906–08. The original part is built in grey brick with sandstone dressings and a slate roof, and the chancel is in red brick with limestone dressings and a tile roof. The church consists of a nave, a chancel with a south chapel and a north organ chamber and vestry, and a west steeple. The steeple has a tower with two stages, angle buttresses, doorways with hood moulds, niches with statues, a west lancet window, clock faces, string courses, triple-lancet bell openings, and a corbel table. It is surmounted by an octagonal broach spire with a finial and a weathervane.
War memorial 53.68952°N 0.96109°W		1921	The war memorial stands on a triangular area in a road junction. It is in Portland stone, and consists of a cenotaph with a stepped capstone, on a large plinth with a moulded cornice and foot, on a base, on a platform of two steps. On the east and west faces are pilasters, and between the pilasters on the east face is a panel with an inverted sword and a wreath in relief above an inscription. The plinth has an inset panel with an inscription and the names of those lost in the First World War. On the base is a plaque with the names of those lost in the Second World War, and a separate plaque with the names of two lost during National Service. The memorial is enclosed by metal railings with fleur-de-lys finials and a gate.
