= Anne Greaves =

First woman to become a member of the Institute of Quarrying

- Born: Anne Harris; 1889; Goole, Yorkshire
- Died: 1971 (aged 81–82)
- Known for: Quarrying and artificial stone

Anne Greaves (1889–1971) was the first English and British woman to become a member of the Institute of Quarrying. She created artificial stone through her quarrying company.

== Early life ==
Born Annie Harris in Goole, Yorkshire in 1889 to musician John Harris, Greaves married shipbroker Somerton Greaves when she was 20. They had two sons, Eric and Raymond. Sometime after the children were born, Greaves and her husband were no longer living together. His business had suffered badly due to the war.

== Business career ==
Although in 1911 Greaves worked as a confectioner, by 1925 she was a quarry manager, and that year became the first woman to be a member of the Institute of Quarry Managers (now the Institute of Quarrying). The land Greaves quarried was leased, and in 1926, she had 9,130 acres of land at Weeland, Hensall, North Yorkshire. It was leased from Robert de Yarburgh-Bateson, 3rd Baron Deramore and the Church Commissioners for fifty pounds a year.

Greaves ran a quarrying company called Weeland Sand Company. It became a Limited company in 1933. The produce was used in the road-building industry and was known as ‘Addingham Edge Grit’ in the British Geological Survey, which described it. Greaves closed that company in 1948, but another called Weeland Sand Co. (Leeds) Ltd. continued to trade. A second business, which Greaves established in 1934, with her brother, Charles Harris, CF Harris Ltd also continued to trade. This was initially also a quarry company, but it moved into transport. Greaves retired from the business in about 1948.

Greaves created an artificial stone which she called " Betna Cast Stone", as it was made using a combination of crushed stone and cement. Artificial stone on the market was often coated with a layer of stone over a cement block. Greaves marketed her product on the grounds that it was superior, as the outer layer could not simply wear off or be damaged. Use of this stone allowed it to be created in any shape needed thus eliminating the need for stone masons who were in short supply after the First World War. Greaves conducted the experimentation necessary to identify the best recipe for the stone.

Anne Greaves moved with one of her sons to Salisbury, Rhodesia, now Harare, Zimbabwe, where she lived until 1971.

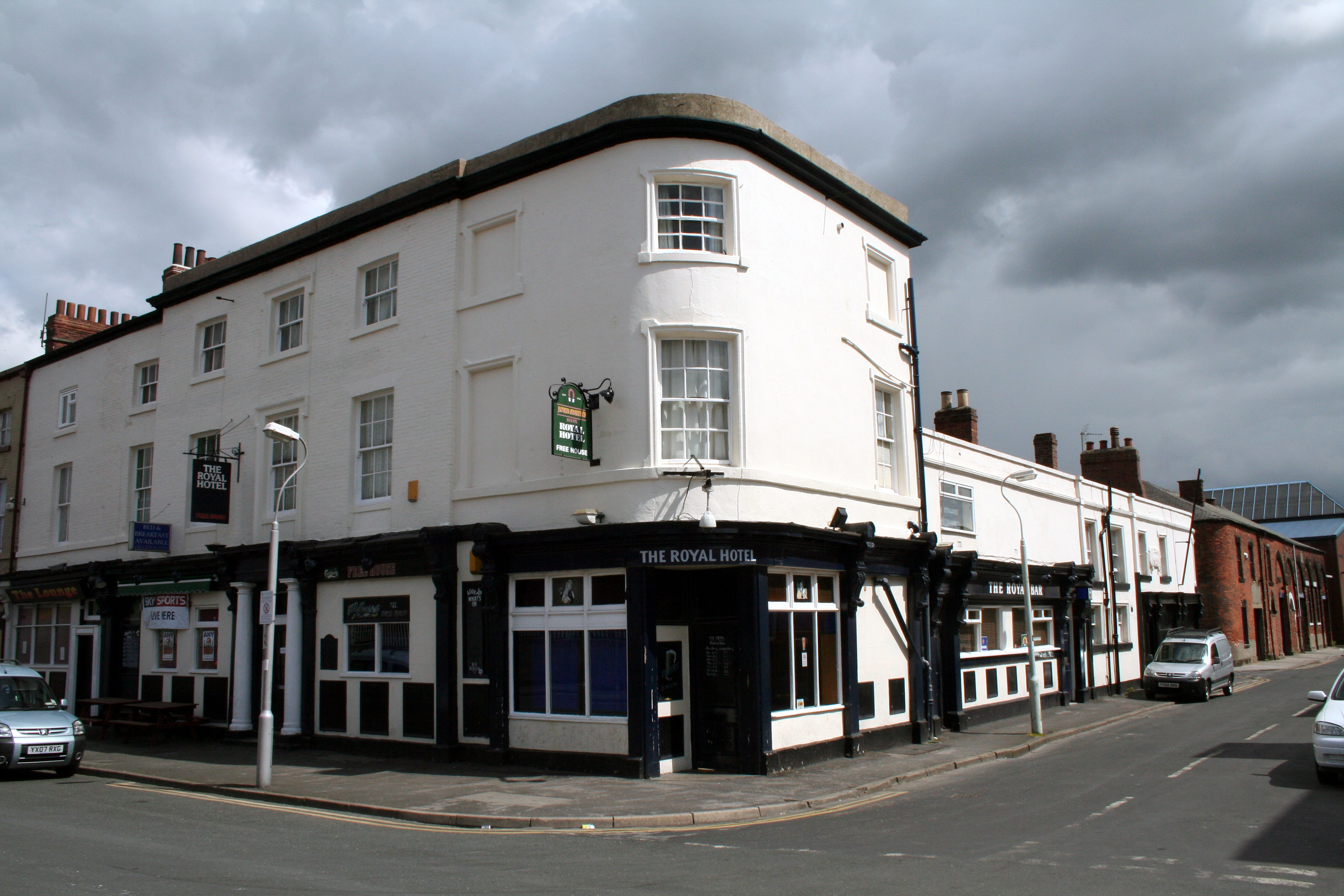
Goole, The 'Royal Hotel', Aire Street

== Commemoration ==
On 30 April 2022 a blue plaque was installed on the side of the Royal Hotel, 9 Aire Street in Goole where the family had their confectionery business, the home Anne Greaves grew up in.

The plaque was installed by the Goole Civic Society.
