= St Wilfrid's Church, Brayton =

Church in North Yorkshire, England

Coordinates: 53°46′19″N 1°05′05″W

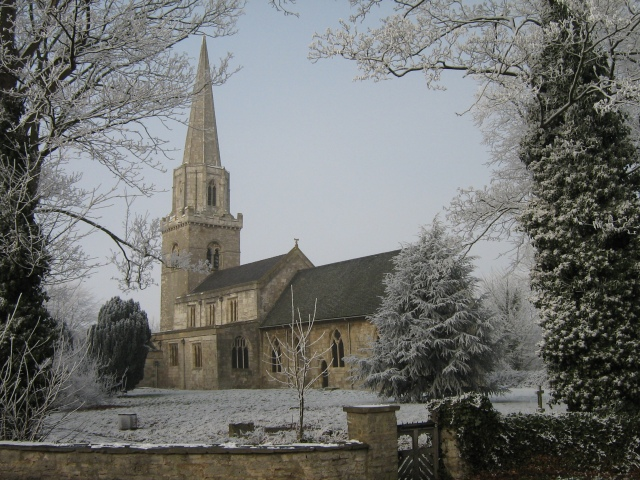
The church from the south-east, in 2008

St Wilfrid's Church is the parish church of Brayton, North Yorkshire, immediately south-west of Selby in England.

== History ==
The oldest parts of the church date from the 12th century; these include the tower, the chancel arch, and the south doorway. The chancel was rebuilt and enlarged in the early 14th century, and aisles were added to the nave at the same time. The nave and aisles were rebuilt later in the century, although the arcades survive, and the south doorway was moved. A lantern was added to the tower in the 15th century, and it was perhaps at this time that a spire was added, although this was shortened in 1766.

From 1873 to 1884, the church was restored by John Loughborough Pearson, with work including altering the floor levels, rebuilding the south porch and some roofs, and adding a vestry. The lantern and spire were repaired by Ronald Sims in 1963 and 1964, and from 1991 to 1993, Peter Pace oversaw repairs including underpinning the nave. The lead roof was replaced with Welsh slate in 1995. In 1966, the church was Grade I listed.

The church is surrounded by green space, some of which floods after heavy rain. This has led to problems with damp in the church.

== Architecture ==
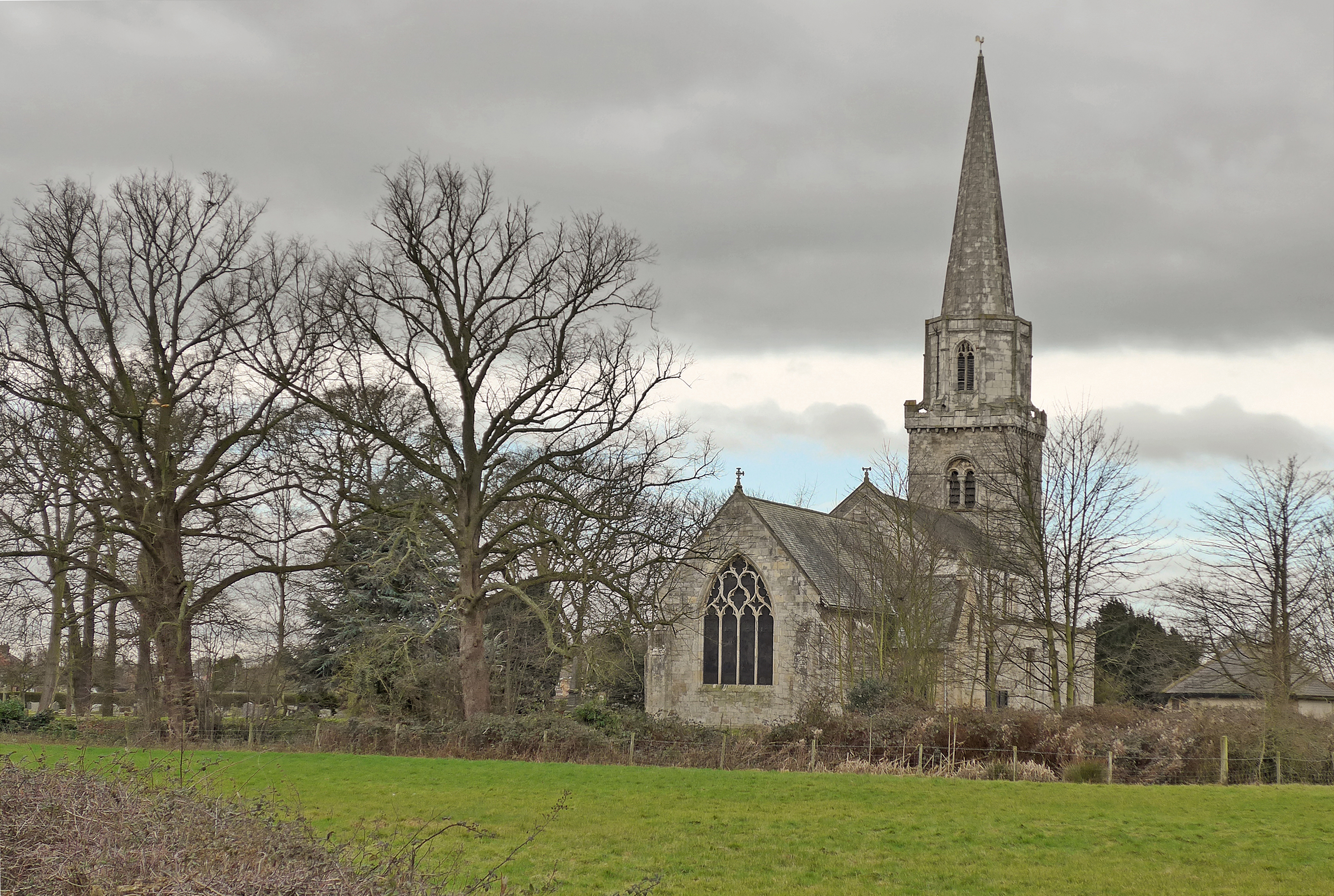
The church from the north-east, in 2015

The church is built of Magnesian Limestone. It has a three-bay nave, and a four-bay chancel, which is longer than the nave. There is a south porch, and a tower at the west end. There are lancet windows on the north and south sides, alongside various larger windows in later styles, including a four-light east window, added in 1895 with stained glass designed by Heaton, Butler and Bayne. The south door is round-headed and has four orders of arches.

Inside, the church has a 14th-century sedilia which has been partly recut, and the tomb of George Darcy, 1st Baron Darcy of Aston and his wife Dorothea, dating from 1558.

== See also ==
- Grade I listed buildings in North Yorkshire (district)
- Listed buildings in Brayton, North Yorkshire
