= Hensall railway station =

Railway station in North Yorkshire, England

Hensall
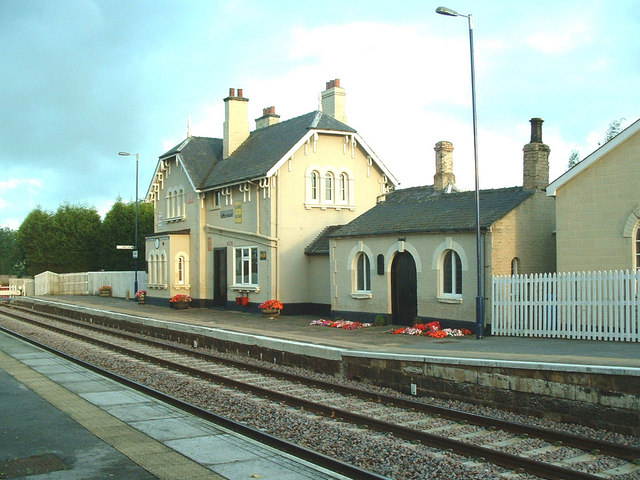

General information
- Location: Hensall, North Yorkshire; England
- Coordinates: 53.698500°N 1.114500°W
- Grid reference: SE585228
- Manager: Northern Trains
- Platforms: 2

Other information
- Station code: HEL
- Classification: DfT category F2

History
- Opened: 1 April 1848

Passengers
- 2021/22: ▲150
- 2022/23: ▲376
- 2023/24: ▲802
- 2024/25: ▼580
- 2025/26: ▼470
Location
Notes
- Passenger statistics from the Office of Rail and Road

Hensall railway station serves the village of Hensall in North Yorkshire, England. It is located on the Pontefract Line and is 22 miles (35 km) east of Leeds. The line is used regularly by the freight companies GB Railfreight, Freightliner and DB Cargo UK that transport biomass to Drax power station. The branch line to the power plant diverges just to the east of the station and was formerly supervised from the nearby signal box, but is now remotely controlled from Ferrybridge signalling centre (see below).

== History ==
The station was built by the Wakefield, Pontefract and Goole Railway, a constituent company of the Lancashire and Yorkshire Railway; the route through here opening to traffic on 1 April 1848. Later in its history the station was absorbed into the LMSR London Midland and Scottish Railway before it became part of the British Railways network in 1948. Today the station is operated by Northern. The station was until 2014 home to one of the last sets of electrical wheel boom level crossing gates in the world; Castleford Cutsyke Junction, Urlay Nook (near Darlington) and Hensall were the final serving gates after the removal of the gates at Brough and Redcar Central. Hensall Signal box (located adjacent the south platform) has recently been awarded grade II listing status along with 25 other historical signal boxes. The list, announced by the Department for Culture, Media and Sport, includes signal boxes dating from late-Victorian times. Despite its listed status, it was taken out of operational use in May 2014, when control of signalling in the area passed to the signalling centre at Ferrybridge. The boom gates were also replaced by standard automatic lifting barriers as part of the project.

Hensall station was also the site of a small collision in 1949 between a British Railways freight engine and a lorry after failure of a crossing keeper to acknowledge the train and brake van approaching, however it was argued that the signal man never gave the crossing the approaching train signal. It is unknown who caused the incident.

The station featured on an episode of the BBC documentary series Great British Railway Journeys in 2015 (series six, episode 12), which saw presenter Michael Portillo travel on the daily parliamentary train from Knottingley to Goole and alight there.

== Facilities ==
The station is unstaffed and has only basic amenities, though the main buildings are still present (they are now privately owned and feature a number of heritage railway signs). Tickets must be bought in advance or on the train, as there are no ticketing facilities. Only the part of the eastbound platform is used, as the section next to the station house is below standard height (the other is full height for its entire length). A public telephone, two waiting shelters and timetable poster boards are the only other amenities present. Step-free access is available on both platforms.

== Services ==
Hensall has only a limited service - Monday to Saturdays, one train a day goes to Goole and two per day go to Leeds. There is no Sunday service. This service is operated by Northern and is booked to be run with class 150 Diesel Multiple Units.

There was a more frequent service in place in the 1970s and 1980s (5-6 trains per day each way - see Table 32 of the 1979, 1985 & 1988 National Passenger timetables for more details), but the timetable was cut in half in 1991 due to a rolling stock shortage and to the present minimal level in 2004. The remaining trains are operated primarily to meet Northern's franchise commitments and to avoid the need for both the station and the Knottingley to Goole line to be put through the formal closure process.

Preceding station	National Rail	Following station
Whitley Bridge	Northern Trains Pontefract Line Mondays-Saturdays only	Snaith
