= St Paul's Church, Hensall =

Church in Hensall, North Yorkshire, England

Coordinates: 53°41′48″N 1°07′07″W

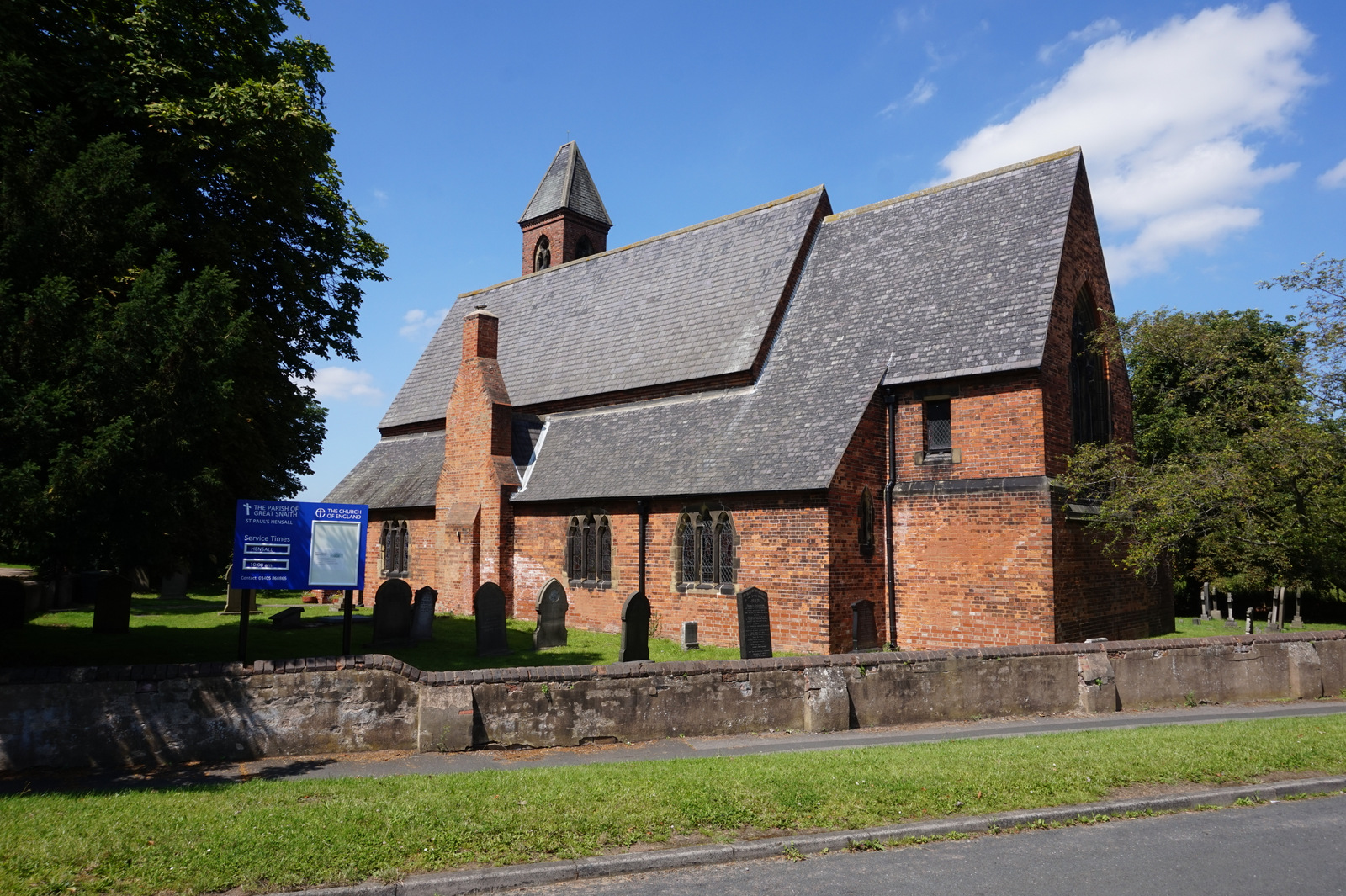
The church, in 2019

St Paul's Church is the parish church of Hensall, North Yorkshire, a village in England.

Until the mid-19th century, Hensall formed part of the parish of St Laurence's Church, Snaith. In 1854, St Paul's Church was completed, having been commissioned by William Dawnay, 7th Viscount Downe and designed by William Butterfield. Butterfield also designed the nearby Red House and Hensal Primary School. The church was given its own parish in 1855. Paul Thompson describes the church as "a compromise between Cowick and Pollington", both churches Butterfield completed in the same year for the same benefactor. Nikolaus Pevsner describes it as "very plain". The church was grade II* listed in 1967.

The church is built of pinkish-red brick with stone dressings and a grey slate roof. It consists of a nave, narrow north and south aisles, a southwest porch, a chancel with a south chapel and a north vestry, and a northwest tower. The tower has a doorway with a pointed arch, a gabled stair turret, slit windows, two-light bell openings, a cogged eaves band, and a pyramidal roof. Inside, most original features survive, including the pews, chapel screen, piscina, Mintons floor tiles, organ, octagonal pulpit and font, and mosaic reredos, which was restored in 1970.

== See also ==
- Grade II* listed churches in North Yorkshire (district)
- Listed buildings in Hensall, North Yorkshire
