= Selby–Goole line =

Railroad line connecting Selby and Goole, Yorkshire, England (1910-1960s)

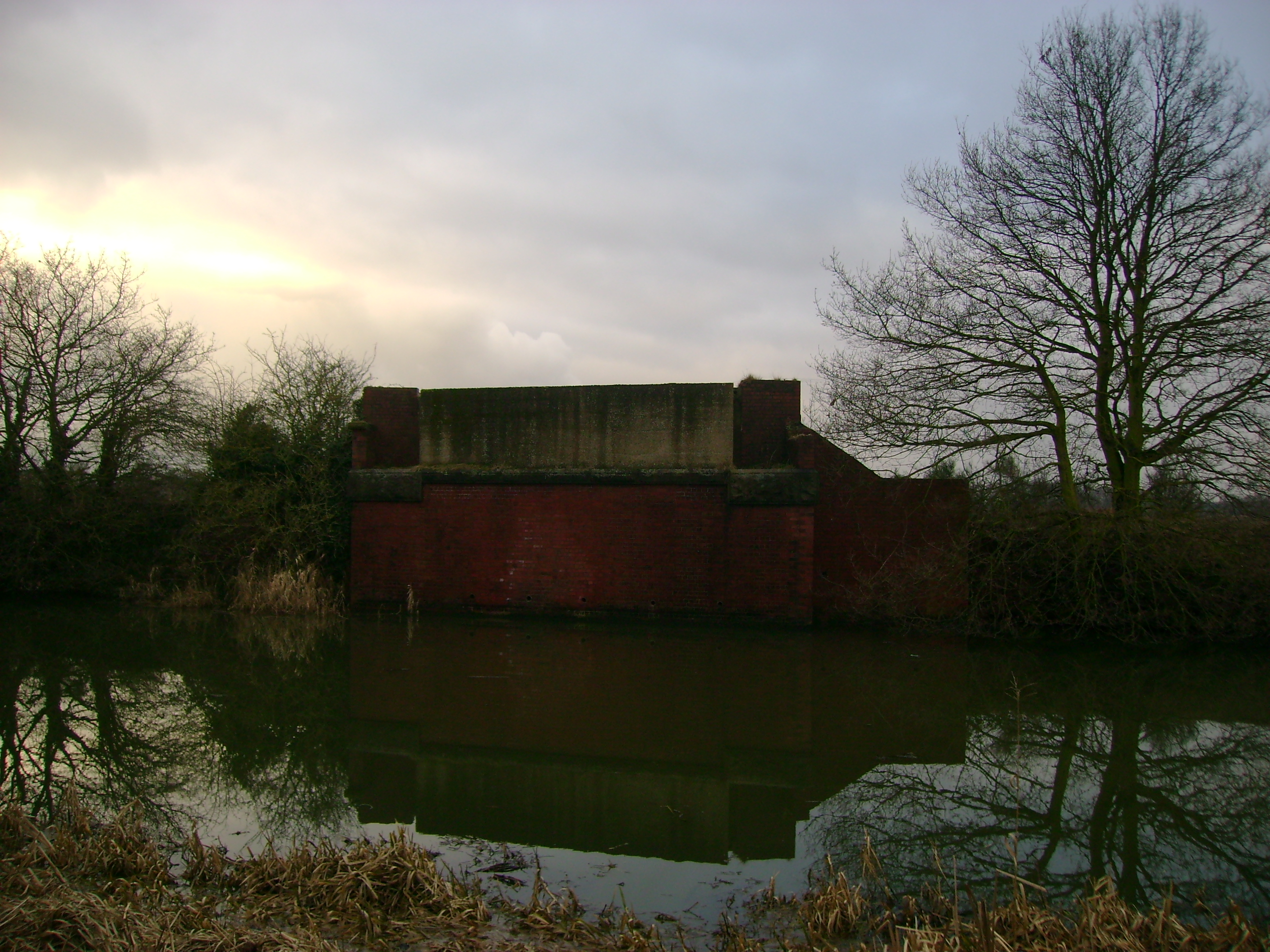
Dismantled bridge across Selby Canal

The Selby–Goole line was a standard gauge branch line connecting Selby and Goole, built in 1910 by the North Eastern Railway. The line closed in the 1960s as part of the Beeching cuts.

== History ==
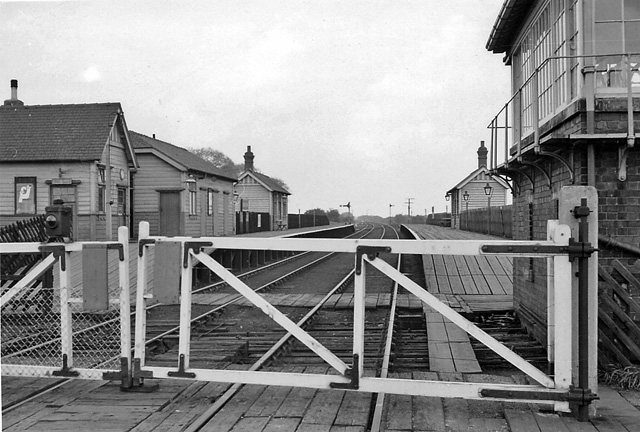
Barlow station (1961)

A line connecting Goole to the rail network via Selby (Brayton) was put before Parliament in 1845 ("Brayton and Goole Railway"), proposed by George Hudson and the York and North Midland Railway (Y&NMR); the line was rejected and another rival scheme, the Wakefield, Pontefract and Goole Railway (later part of the L&YR) was accepted by parliament in the same year, becoming Goole's first rail link.

At the time of the branch's construction Goole was served by the Lancashire and Yorkshire Railway (L&YR), Selby by the North Eastern Railway, and Drax by the Hull and Barnsley Railway. However a bottleneck at the two-track Selby swing bridge on the already busy East Coast Main Line from London to Scotland meant that freight trains were often delayed, the building of the line was therefore desirable since it offered another path to the port of Hull via Goole for the coal and other freight that was exported via the port at that time.

Construction of the railway began in 1907, with Baldry & Yerburgh chosen as contractors, and A. C. Mitchell and W. J. Cudworth acting as the NER's engineers. The line was built as a doubled tracked railway, with much of it being built on embankments.

Freight traffic did not meet expectations and the line was reduced to single track after 1923. The line was closed in 1964. (Note: The track from Brayton junction as far as Barlow station remained open, serving a railway tip, and later being used for training track maintenance vehicle operators. Source Railway Memories No. 14 Selby and Goole. Stephen Chapman)

=== Route ===
The line can be considered to begin at Thorpe Gates Junction Signal box; where the new line branches off to the right from the line of the former Leeds and Selby Railway when approaching from the west towards Selby, it then crossed over the former East Coast Main Line by an overhead bridge. A branch from Selby then met the line from the north; somewhere east of Brayton.

Three intermediate stations were served Barlow station, Drax Hales station, (Note: The village of Drax now having two stations until 1923 with Drax Abbey railway station) and Airmyn and Rawcliffe station.

The line reached Goole via a junction onto the 1910 diversion of the original L&YR line. The Selby and Goole joined at Oakhill junction and then ran on the line, where it joined the NER's "Loop line" section of the Hull and Doncaster Branch (1869) at Potter's Grange junction just west of Goole station.

=== Rolling stock ===
Initially passenger services railway was operated with steam railcars consisting of tank engine and carriage couple, the engine being designed by Edward Fletcher, later LNER Class G5s were used. Later Sentinel railcars were used, and Diesel multiple units operated the line before closure.

== Line following closure ==
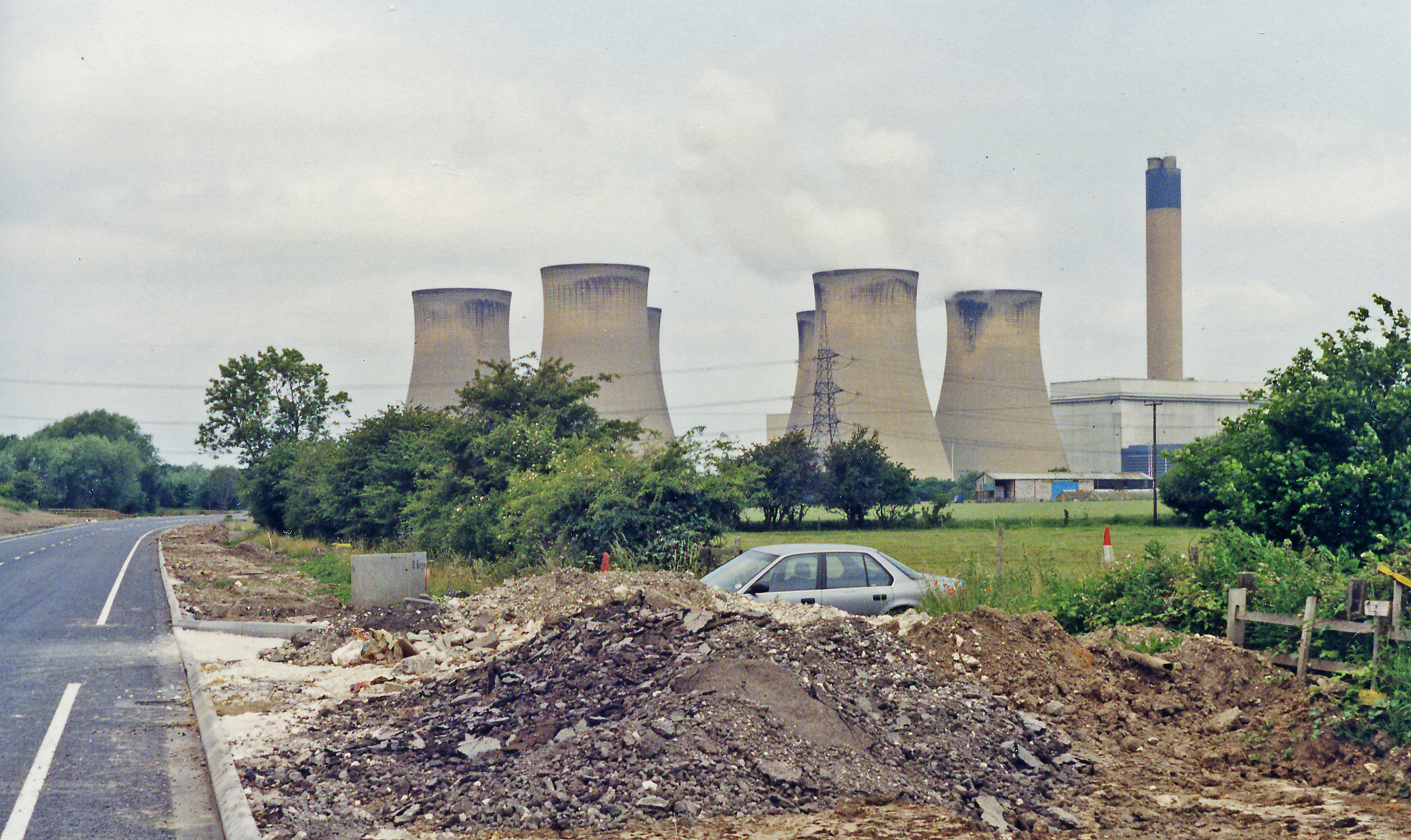
Site of Drax Hales station (1992)

North-west of the crossing with the Hull and Barnsley Railway only parts of the embanked trackbed remain, the bridges and track having been removed. The line to Barlow continued to be used to the WD depot and was extended 1/2 mile (0.8 km) in October 1966 to provide connection to Drax Power Station when it was being built. That section became Barlow Common nature reserve in 1986. The crossing with the Hull and Barnsley now forms the southern perimeter of Drax Power Station, which is fed from the H&BR. South-east of the crossing little remains – the route of the line is now mostly replaced by the A645 road.

== In popular culture ==
The line is one of the examples of the Beeching Axe mentioned in the Flanders and Swann song "The Slow Train".

No one departs, no one arrives, From Selby to Goole, from St Erth to St Ives.
