= Goole railway station =

Railway station in the East Riding of Yorkshire, England

Goole
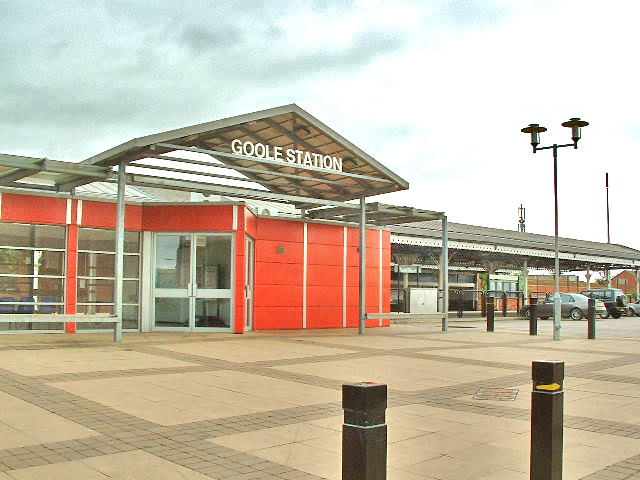

General information
- Location: Goole, East Riding of Yorkshire, England
- Coordinates: 53.705124°N 0.872000°W
- Grid reference: SE744237
- Managed by: Northern Trains
- Platforms: 2

Other information
- Station code: GOO
- Classification: DfT category E

History
- Opened: 1 October 1869

Passengers
- 2020/21: ▼68,586
- 2021/22: ▲0.233 million
- 2022/23: ▲0.261 million
- 2023/24: ▲0.278 million
- 2024/25: ▲0.325 million
Location
Notes
- Passenger statistics from the Office of Rail and Road

Goole railway station is a stop on the Hull and Doncaster Branch; it serves the port town of Goole, in the East Riding of Yorkshire, England. The station is managed by Northern Trains, which also operates all passenger services. Lines from Goole run north to the Hull and Selby Line at Gilberdyke (formerly Staddlethorpe); south to the South Humberside Main Line near Thorne; there is also a westward line to Knottingley mostly used by freight, with an infrequent passenger service.

== History ==
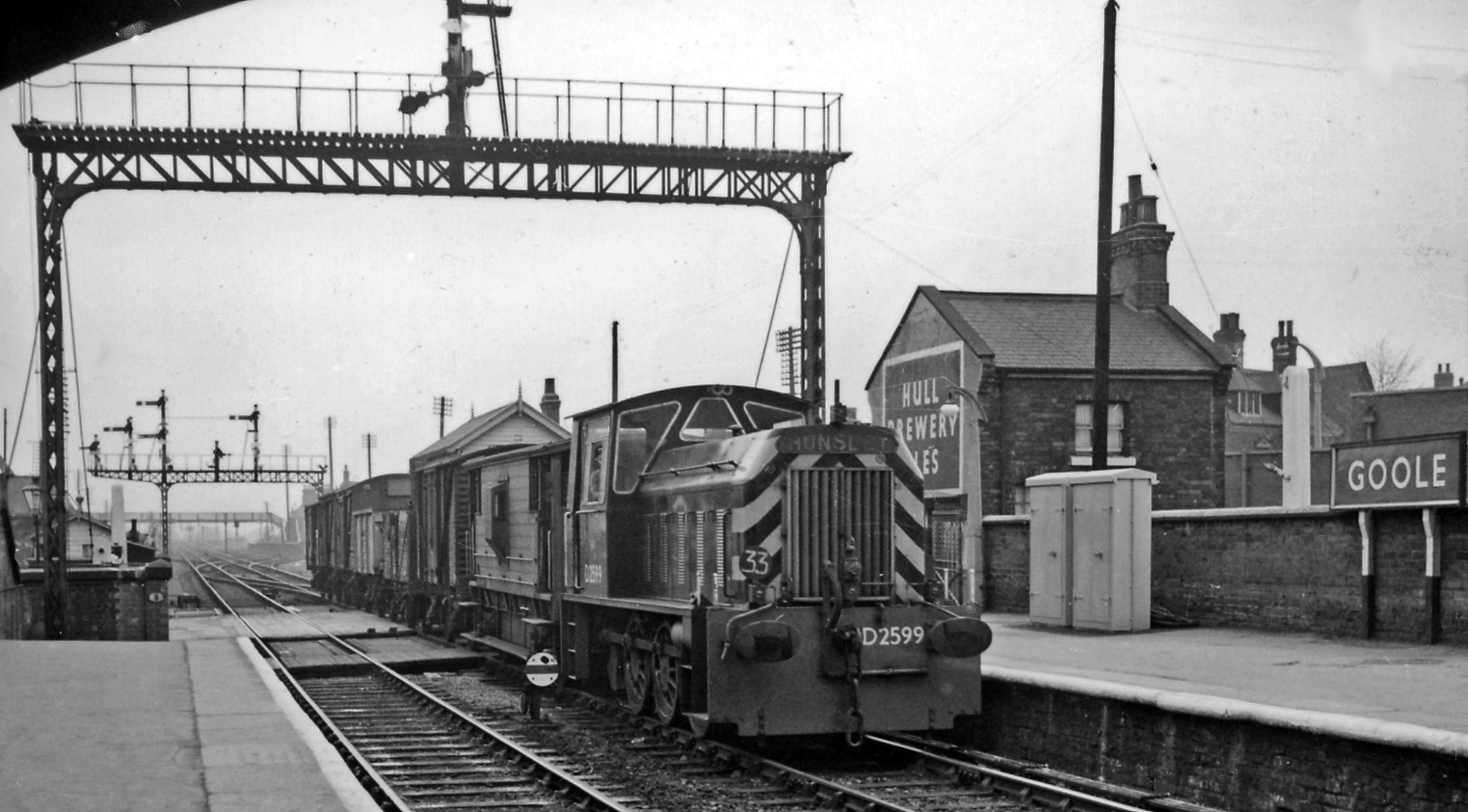
Diesel-hauled goods trip, April 1961

The Wakefield, Pontefract and Goole Railway obtained authorisation in 1845 to build a railway to Goole, as well as building a pier and improving the harbour. However, it was amalgamated before construction with the Manchester and Leeds Railway in 1846. In 1847 the Manchester and Leeds Railway was authorised to change its name to the Lancashire and Yorkshire Railway, and in 1848 the L&YR was Goole's first connected railway.

The current station was opened by the NER on 1 October 1869, along with their line from Thorne Junction to Gilberdyke. Passenger trains from the Knottingley direction initially ran to a terminus station next to the docks but this was closed when the NER station opened, trains then using a short curve to join the main line at Potter's Grange Junction 440 yards (400 m) south of the new station. The former L&Y line into the docks remained a busy freight route for many years afterwards, but has now been lifted (though access to the remaining dock sidings is still possible from the main line).

Goole station is mentioned in the song "Slow Train" by Flanders and Swann about various closed lines on the British railway network.

No one departs, no one arrives, from Selby to Goole, from St Erth to St Ives.

The Selby to Goole Line which opened in 1910, ran via the villages of Rawcliffe, Drax and Barlow until its closure in 1964.

There was a small buffet run by the Kitwood family on the up platform and a small office on the down platform serving a wholesale newspaper business run by Joe Kelbrick; nearby there is a small goods yard used by DB Cargo UK steel trains. The station saw heavy redevelopment in the 1970s.

== Facilities ==
The station has a ticket office on platform 2 (southbound), which is staffed part-time (07:00 – 13:30) on weekdays and Saturdays only. A self-service ticket machine is available for use outside of these times and for collecting pre-paid tickets. A waiting room and vending machine are provided on platform 2 and a shelter on platform 1, along with extensive canopies on each side. Digital display screens, timetable posters and automated announcements are used to give train running information. Step-free access is available to both platforms via the ramped subway linking them. There are no toilet facilities at the station.

== Services ==
Northern Trains operates services on the following two routes:

- On Monday to Saturday daytimes, two trains an hour eastbound to Hull; one of which continues to Scarborough, via the Yorkshire Coast Line, and towards Doncaster southbound. One of the latter runs fast through to Meadowhall and Sheffield, whilst the other stops at all stations and terminates at Doncaster. On Sundays, there are two trains per hour each to Hull and Doncaster, with hourly extensions to Sheffield and Bridlington/Scarborough.
- The Pontefract Line has a Parliamentary train service level of just two trains per day (Monday to Saturday) to Knottingley and Leeds. Only one train runs in the opposite direction; the other early morning one runs empty from Leeds to take up its return working. The service was more frequent in the 1980s, but was reduced in 1991 (due to a DMU shortage) and again in 2004 (when the mid-day service was curtailed at Knottingley). It continues to run mainly so that the TOC meets its statutory franchise requirements and avoids the need for the line to be put through the formal closure process.

Preceding station	National Rail	Following station
Thorne North	Northern Trains Hull and Doncaster Branch	Saltmarshe
Thorne North	Northern Trains Hull and Doncaster Branch	Gilberdyke
Rawcliffe	Northern Trains Pontefract Line Mondays-Saturdays only	Terminus
	Disused railways	
Airmyn; Line and station closed	Selby to Goole Line (NER)	Terminus
Terminus	Axholme Joint Railway	Reedness Junction; Line and station closed
