= All Saints' Church, Barlby =

Church in Barlby, North Yorkshire, England

Coordinates: 53.7988°N 1.0416°W

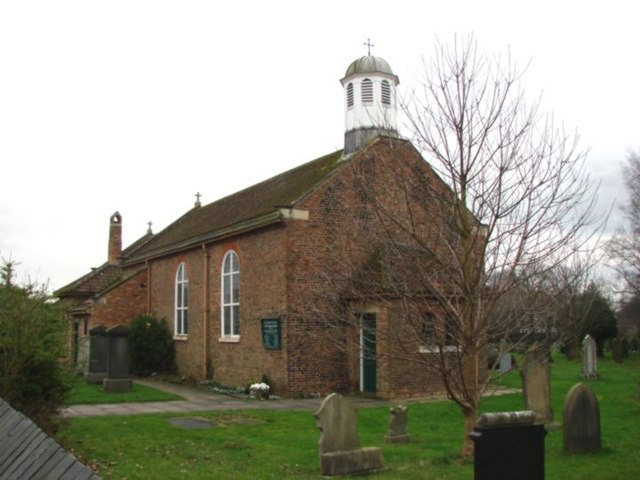
The church, in 2007

All Saints' Church is the parish church of Barlby, a village in North Yorkshire in England.

A chapel was constructed in Barlby by 1481, dependent on St Mary the Virgin, Hemingbrough. By the late 18th century, the chapel was in ruins, and it was demolished. A replacement church was built between 1779 and 1780, a rectangular structure with an apse at the east end, an octagonal bellcote, and a vestry on the north side. A gallery at the west end was added in 1811, followed in the 1840s by two projections on the north side to house additional pews. The vestry was rebuilt in 1866.

The church was rebuilt and extended in 1895, when it was given its own parish. The northern extensions were removed, and a chancel, porch and new vestry added. The interior was entirely reconstructed, and the gallery was removed. The church was Grade II listed in 1986.

The church is built of brick, and has a two-level roof of pantiles and stone slates. There is a three-bay nave and a two-bay chancel. The windows have round heads, and that at the east end has 19th-century stained glass. The octagonal wooden bellcote survives, and the chancel has a brick bell turret.

== See also ==
- Listed buildings in Barlby with Osgodby
