= Hemingbrough =

Village and civil parish in North Yorkshire, England

Coordinates: 53.767°N 0.979°W

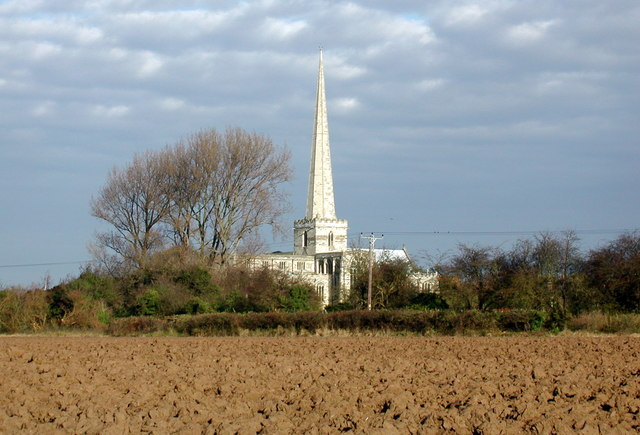
- St Mary's Church

- Location within North Yorkshire
- Population: 2,020 (2011 census)
- OS grid reference: SE674306
- Civil parish: Hemingbrough
- Unitary authority: North Yorkshire
- Ceremonial county: North Yorkshire
- Region: Yorkshire and the Humber
- Country: England
- Sovereign state: United Kingdom
- Post town: SELBY
- Postcode district: YO8
- Police: North Yorkshire
- Fire: North Yorkshire
- Ambulance: Yorkshire
- Website: Parish Council

Hemingbrough is a village and civil parish in North Yorkshire, England, approximately 5 miles (8 km) from Selby and 4 miles (6.4 km) from Howden on the A63. It was in the historic East Riding of Yorkshire, but since 1974 has come under North Yorkshire. The village has a 12th-century former collegiate church (Hemingbrough Minster), a Methodist chapel and shops. There is a primary school and nursery. The surrounding area makes up part of the Humberhead Levels and is flat land, mainly used for mixed agriculture. In 2011 the parish had a population of 2020.

== History and overview ==
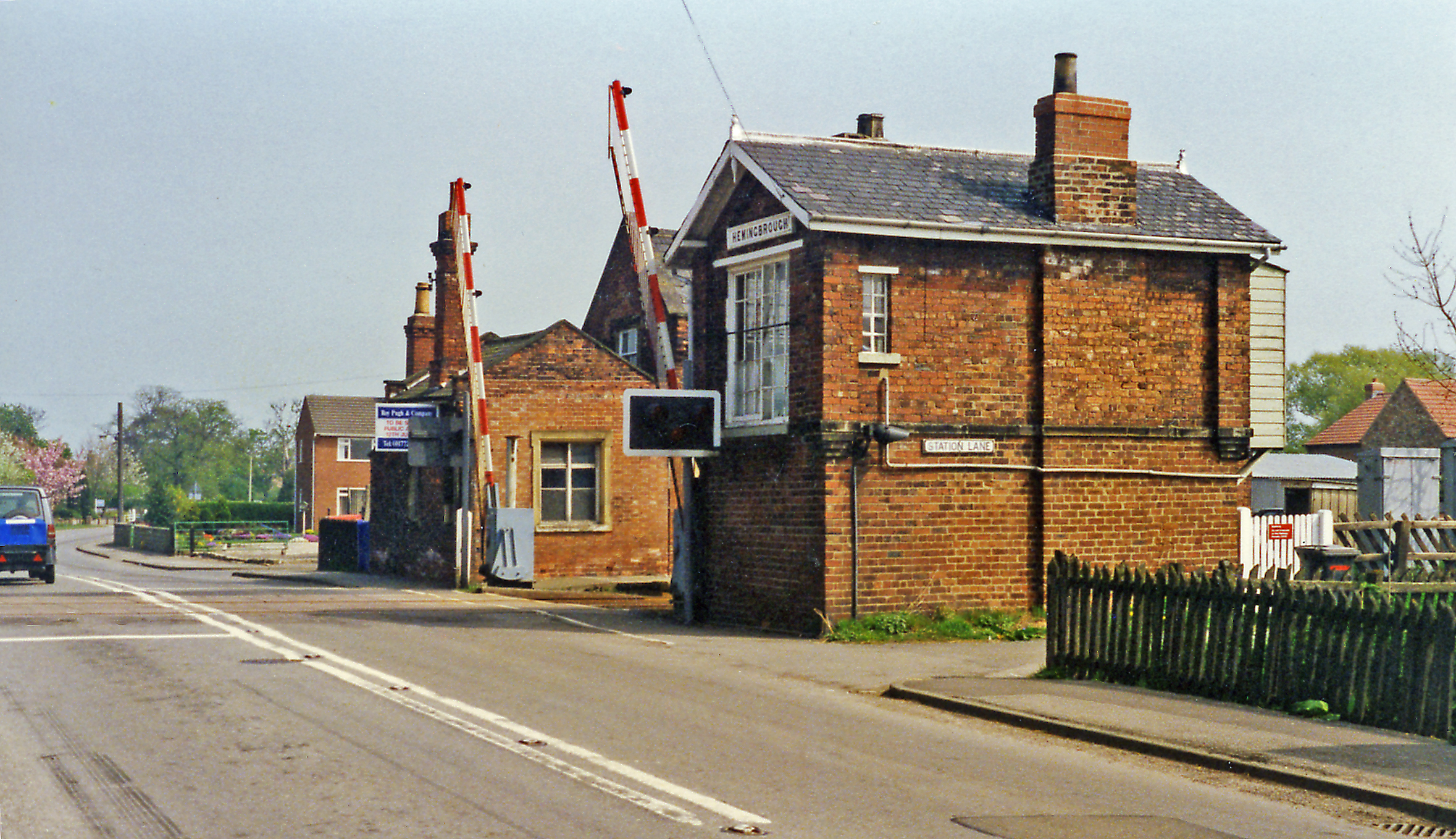
Hemingbrough station

The toponym is of uncertain origin. The place is mentioned in the Knýtlinga saga, and the name may be the burh of a Viking named Hemingr. Alternative explanations are that it was the burh of the followers of a man called Hema, or the burh by the fish-weir (Old English hemming).

It is thought that from this village came Walter of Hemingbrough, one of Britain's early chroniclers. Writing in the 14th century, he gave us a history beginning with the Norman Conquest, now in the British Museum.

In the Middle Ages the village was in the Ouse and Derwent wapentake of the East Riding of Yorkshire. At that time the village was on the River Ouse, but at some point the river broke through a meander leaving the village some distance from the river. Hemingbrough was a large parish, and included the townships of Barlby, Osgodby, Cliffe with Lund, South Duffield, Brackenholme with Woodhall and Menthorpe with Bowthorpe. All these townships became separate civil parishes in 1866. In 1935 the civil parish of Hemingbrough absorbed the civil parish of Brackenholme with Woodhall.

In 1974 Hemingbrough was transferred from the East Riding to the new county of North Yorkshire. From 1974 to 2023, the parish was in the Selby District of the shire county of North Yorkshire. In 2023 the district was abolished and North Yorkshire became a unitary authority.

The village holds a summer fete, replete with floats on lorries and tractor trailers. There is a memorial garden which the Archbishop of York Dr John Sentamu visited in April 2016.

In February 2014, Hemingbrough Parish Council were awarded funds from the Heritage Lottery Fund to help raise awareness of the historical heritage within Hemingbrough Parish to benefit the local community.

== Parish church ==
The village has a 12th-century church dedicated to St Mary the Virgin, which served as a minster to this area until the dissolution of the monasteries. It has a 120-foot (37 m) spire, added in the 15th century, which allows it to dominate the plain. The church is Grade I listed; its importance lies in the woodwork and carvings in the church and it has oldest recorded misericord in the country.

== Notable residents ==
- Robert de Hemmingburgh, a royal clerk who became Master of the Rolls in Ireland, was born here in the late thirteenth century.
- Nicholas Bubbewyth, a chancery clerk who became successively Master of the Rolls, Keeper of the Privy Seal, Lord High Treasurer of England, and Bishop of London, Bishop of Salisbury and Bishop of Bath and Wells, was born in Menthorpe.
- Blessed Robert Dalby – Catholic priest and martyr
- The Kirlew family were influential in Hemingbrough for many centuries. George Kirlew of this family was a big slave owner in Jamaica and ended up owning what is now the Mount Royale Hotel in York.
- Jeremiah Smith (Royal Navy officer) (died 1675)

== See also ==
- Listed buildings in Hemingbrough
