= Barlby with Osgodby =

Civil parish in North Yorkshire, England

Coordinates: 53.80031°N 1.02369°W

Barlby with Osgodby is a civil parish in the county of North Yorkshire, England, just to the north of Selby.

The parish covers Barlby and Osgodby and had a population of 4,533 according to the 2001 census, increasing to 4,974 at the 2011 Census. From 1974 to 2023 it was part of the Selby District, it is now administered by the unitary North Yorkshire Council.

== See also ==
- Listed buildings in Barlby with Osgodby
