= Robert de Hemmingburgh =

English-born Irish judge, and priest

Robert de Hemmingburgh (died 1349) was an English-born judge and priest, who held office as Master of the Rolls in Ireland, and possibly as Lord Chancellor of Ireland.

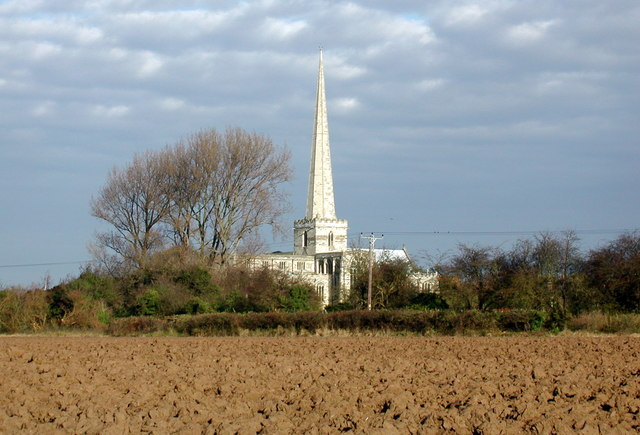
St Mary's Church, Hemingbrough, which was Robert's birthplace

He took his name from his birthplace, Hemingbrough, in North Yorkshire. William de Hemmingborough, who died in Hemingborough in 1410, may have been a relative of Robert, or may simply, like Robert, have taken his name from his homeplace. Nor is it clear if he was related to the later Robert de Hemynborough, who was appointed Attorney-General for Ireland in 1385.

Robert became a clerk of the English Chancery about 1319. He is said to have been a valued royal servant, who was highly regarded by both Edward II and Edward III. He was a noted religious pluralist, acquiring numerous livings in England, Scotland and Ireland, though we know the names of only two of these livings, Glasgow and Antingham, Norfolk, which had previously been held by a relative who had given good service to the Crown. In Ireland he continued his career of pluralism, and we are told that he and his assistant acquired numerous other livings, the names of which are not recorded.

In 1337 he was sent to Ireland in the entourage of the new Lord Chancellor of Ireland, Thomas Charlton, Bishop of Hereford. He was appointed Master of the Rolls - only the third holder of the office - and served as Master until 1346. According to some sources, he was briefly Lord Chancellor of Ireland himself. He died in 1349.
