= Listed buildings in Hemingbrough =

Hemingbrough is a civil parish in the county of North Yorkshire, England. It contains 16 listed buildings that are recorded in the National Heritage List for England. Of these, one is listed at Grade I, the highest of the three grades, and the others are at Grade II, the lowest grade. The parish contains the village of Hemingbrough and the surrounding countryside. Most of the listed buildings are houses and associated structures, and the others are a church and a school.

== Key ==
Grade	Criteria
I	Buildings of exceptional interest, sometimes considered to be internationally important
II	Buildings of national importance and special interest

== Buildings ==
Name and location	Photograph	Date	Notes	Grade
St Mary's Church; 53.76759°N 0.97965°W		Late 12th century	The church has been altered and extended through the centuries, including restorations in 1885–86 by Ewan Christian and in 1893 by Walter Brierley. The church is built in magnesian limestone with a lead roof. There is a cruciform plan, consisting of a nave, north and south aisles, a south porch, north and south transepts, a chancel with a south aisle and a chapter house and a vestry to the north, and a steeple at the crossing. The steeple as a tower containing two-light bell openings with Y-tracery, an embattled parapet, and a tall octagonal spire. The body of the church also has an embattled parapet.	I
Church Farmhouse; 53.76777°N 0.97889°W		Mid 18th century	The house is in reddish-pink brick with dressings in red brick, floor bands, an eaves cornice, and a swept pantile roof with stone coping and kneelers. There are two storeys and an attic, and five bays. The windows are sashes, those in the ground floor with flat rubbed red brick arches. In the right gable end is a partly blocked pitching door.	II
Derwent View; 53.76224°N 0.93646°W	—	Mid 18th century	The house, later divided into two, is in pinkish-brown brick, with a floor band, a cogged eaves band and a pantile roof. There are two storeys, a double depth plan and three bays. The central doorway has pilasters and a hood on decorative brackets, and the windows are sashes with painted wedge lintels.	II
Hagthorpe Hall; 53.76341°N 0.93750°W	—	Mid 18th century	The house on a moated site, with earlier origins, has been divided into two. It is in orange and pinkish-brown brick, with a floor band, and a pantile roof with stone coping. There are two storeys and six bays. The doorway has a fanlight, and the windows are sashes, most under painted flat arches of red gauged brick.	II
Hoton House; 53.77030°N 0.97878°W	—	1751	The house is in pinkish-brown brick, with dressings in red brick and stone, a three-course floor band, a modillion eaves cornice, and a swept tile roof with stone coping and kneelers, one kneeler dated. There are two storeys, a double depth plan, and three bays. The central doorway has a fanlight, and the windows are sashes under cambered heads of red gauged brick with keystones.	II
The Hollies; 53.77057°N 0.97894°W	—	1763	The house is in pinkish-brown brick on a plinth, with stone dressings, a dentilled eaves cornice, sprocketed eaves, and a pantile roof with stone coping and kneelers. There are two storeys and four bays. The doorway in the third bay has a blind round-arched fanlight with a keystone, and above it is a blind Venetian window. The other windows are sashes with wedge lintels.	II
The Orchard; 53.76723°N 0.97895°W	—	Mid to late 18th century	The house is in colourwashed rendered brick, with a floor band, dentilled eaves, and a swept pantile roof with rendered coping and kneelers. There are two storeys and three bays. The central doorway has a fanlight, above it is a blocked window with an elliptical-arched head, and the windows are casements.	II
Tythe Farm; 53.76836°N 0.97909°W	—	Mid to late 18th century	The house is in reddish-pink brick on a plinth, with stone dressings, a three-course floor band, and a pantile roof with brick coping and kneelers. There are two storeys and four bays. The doorway is in the third bay, and the windows are casements, all with wedge lintels.	II
Stables, Hagthorpe Hall; 53.76330°N 0.93803°W	—	Late 18th century (probable)	The stables with haylofts are in pinkish-brown brick, with red brick dressings and a hipped asbestos roof. There are two storeys and four bays, the middle two bays projecting. The buildings contain three stable doors and a double door in the ground floor, and casement windows above, all under flat arches of gauged brick.	II
Hawthorn House; 53.76884°N 0.97873°W		Late 18th century	The house, which was later extended, is in pinkish-brown brick, the extension is in pinkish-yellow brick, and it has a three-course floor band, a dentilled eaves band, and a pantile roof with stone coping and kneelers. There are two storeys, the original part has three bays, and the extension has two. The original part has a central doorway and casement windows, all under flat arches of rubbed brick. The extension contains sash windows with wedge lintels, and one horizontally-sliding sash window.	II
Coach house and stables, Tythe Farm; 53.76822°N 0.97921°W	—	Late 18th century	The coach house and stables are in reddish-pink brick, with dressings in red brick, a stepped eaves band, and a pantile roof hipped on the left. There are two storeys and seven bays. The ground floor contains two stable doors, one blocked, a cart opening, and blind openings, all with cambered heads of red rubbed brick, and inserted casement windows. In the upper floor is a central Venetian window and oculi.	II
The Old Hall; 53.76893°N 0.97914°W		c. 1800	The house, later divided, is in pinkish-brown brick, with stone dressings, brick quoins, floor bands, a modillion eaves cornice, a frieze, a pediment containing a semicircular recess, and a Welsh slate roof. There are two storeys, a double depth plan, and three bays, the middle bay recessed and taller. The central doorway is in a round-arched recess, and has a dentilled frieze, an open pediment, and side windows. Above the doorway and in the ground floor of the outer bays are sash windows under painted flat arches. The outer bays in the upper floor contain Diocletian windows with rubbed brick architraves.	II
Cowshed and granary, The Old Hall; 53.76900°N 0.97920°W	—	Early 19th century	The cowshed and granary are in pinkish-brown brick, with two storeys and a single bay. In the centre is a blocked entrance with a cambered arch. The later entrance is on the side, and in the gable end is a pitching door.	II
The Villa; 53.77149°N 0.97935°W	—	Early 19th century	The house is in pinkish-brown brick on a plinth, with stone dressings, and a tile roof with stone coping and kneelers. There are two storeys and three bays, and a later extension to the right. Three steps lead up to a doorway with engaged columns, a radial fanlight with decorative glazing, a frieze and a hood. The windows are pivoting with twelve panes and wedge lintels. At the rear is a round-arched stair window with imposts and a keystone.	II
Wood Hall; 53.77750°N 0.94287°W	—	Early to mid 19th century	The house is in gault brick, the service wing is in red brick, and the house has stone dressings, an overhanging cornice, a low parapet, and a Welsh slate roof. The main block has two storeys and three bays. The doorway has a Roman Doric doorcase, a radial fanlight, a frieze and an open pediment, and above it is a stair Venetian window. The other windows are sashes in architraves. On the left side is a full-height canted bay window, and the service wing has two storeys and two bays.	II
Old Village School; 53.76702°N 0.97728°W	—	1847	The school is in pinkish-brown brick, with stone dressings, bracketed overhanging eaves and a hipped Welsh slate roof. There is a single storey, an oblong plan, and three bays. On the front are three round-arched windows with imposts, keystones, and moulded mullions. The middle window is larger, it contains Y-tracery, and around it is an inscription and the date.	II
