= Russell Howarth =

English association football player (born 1982)

Personal information
- Full name: Russell Michael Howarth
- Date of birth: 27 March 1982 (age 44)
- Place of birth: York, England
- Height: 6 ft 2 in (1.88 m)
- Position: Goalkeeper

Youth career
- 1996–1999: York City

Senior career*
Years	Team	Apps	(Gls)
1999–2002	York City	8	(0)
2002–2005	Tranmere Rovers	12	(0)
2005–2007	Bradford City	11	(0)
Total		31	(0)

International career
1999	England U16	2	(0)
2000–2001	England U18	4	(0)
2001–2002	England U20	4	(0)
- * Club domestic league appearances and goals

Russell Michael Howarth (born 27 March 1982) is an English former professional footballer who played as a goalkeeper. He played in the Football League for York City, Tranmere Rovers and Bradford City.

Howarth started his career in the youth system of hometown club York City in 1996 while a schoolboy, before becoming a trainee in 1998. He made his first-team debut aged 17, playing in the first six matches of the 1999–2000 season. During this run in the team, he signed a professional contract with the club. However, he was unable to play regularly for York because of the form of Bobby Mimms and Alan Fettis. After having trials with Premier League and First Division clubs, Howarth left York in November 2002 to sign for Tranmere Rovers for a five-figure fee. Here, he again played sporadically, only having runs in the team when first-choice goalkeeper John Achterberg was unavailable. After being released by Tranmere in 2005, Howarth signed for Bradford City. However, he was unable to dislodge Donovan Ricketts in goal and was released in 2007. He retired from football and started working as a paramedic.

While at York, Howarth played for England at a number of youth levels. He was capped twice at under-16 level in 1999, while still a trainee at York. He competed with Chelsea's Rhys Evans for a starting place in the under-18 team, playing for them in 2001 UEFA European Under-18 Championship qualifying. After making four under-18 appearances from 2000 to 2001, he progressed to the under-20 team, competing with Evans, Stephen Bywater and Boaz Myhill for a place in the team. He was capped four times for the team from 2001 to 2002 before being given a late call-up to the under-21 squad for the 2002 UEFA European Under-21 Championship. He was still included in under-21 squads after moving to Tranmere, but failed to be capped at that level.

== Early life ==
Howarth was born in York to Michael and Lyn Howarth (née Hammond). He was baptised in Riccall, North Yorkshire and attended Barlby High School. As a youth, he played as a goalkeeper for Olympia Station FC, before representing York and District Schools aged 12. In one season, however, he played as a left winger and scored 29 goals. He soon returned to playing in goal and impressed Huntington School teacher Alan Whitehead, a former York City player, who ran the York and District team.

== Club career ==
=== York City ===
Howarth started his career with hometown club York City in their youth system, joining in 1996 on schoolboy terms. In the summer of 1998, he signed a three-year academy scholarship at York and became a first-year trainee. During May 1999, he played for York in the Candia-66 International Under-20s Tournament, a youth tournament hosted in Europe. York won the tournament after defeating Trenkvin Slowakigie in the final, in which Howarth saved two penalty kicks in the 4–2 penalty shoot-out victory. Aged 17, he made his first-team debut for Third Division York in a 1–0 victory at home to Swansea City in the opening match of the 1999–2000 season on 7 August 1999. He started the season as York's first-choice goalkeeper ahead of the experienced Bobby Mimms, keeping clean sheets in the first three matches. On 26 August 1999, two days after making his fifth successive appearance, Howarth signed a three-year professional contract with York. However, after conceding 11 goals in three matches, and having played in York's first six matches of the season, manager Neil Thompson dropped him for the more experienced Mimms. York's management team insisted Howarth's exclusion was to safeguard him, and was not based on merit. His next appearance came as a 72nd-minute substitute in York's 2–0 defeat away to Plymouth Argyle on 19 February 2000, following an injury to Mimms. Howarth was favoured over Mimms for the following match, a 0–0 draw at home to Exeter City on 26 February 2000. However, following the signing of Northern Ireland international Alan Fettis, Howarth was once again restricted to the substitutes' bench. His first season in senior football finished with eight appearances.

In May 2000, Howarth played for Premier League club Leeds United in a seven-a-side tournament in Singapore, because their own goalkeepers were unavailable. He also represented York in the Candia-66 International Under-20s Tournament for a second successive summer, although he only played one match as he was being rested after playing for Leeds. His first appearance of 2000–01 came 22 August 2000, in York's 5–1 defeat at home to Stoke City in the League Cup first round first leg. During the match, he fumbled a Graham Fenton cross, and Stoke opened the scoring from the error. He garnered praise from York's part-time goalkeeping coach and former Everton player Neville Southall, who Howarth held as a boyhood hero, saying: "Russ can be as good as he wants to be. He works hard and has a great attitude when a lot of youngsters today at big clubs don't have such a good attitude. He will succeed. Even if it is in three, five or even ten years, he will succeed." With Fettis rested, Howarth made his second appearance of the season on 9 January 2001, starting in a 4–0 defeat at home to Darlington in the Football League Trophy Northern Section first round. Despite conceding four goals, he was the only player to escape criticism from manager Terry Dolan, who said: "He was let down by everyone else around him. He had no protection whatsoever. His kicking was excellent and he did everything else he had to do without a problem." Due to the good form of Fettis, Howarth finished the season with only two appearances.

Howarth made his first appearance of 2001–02 in the 2–0 defeat away to Notts County on 16 October 2001 in the Football League Trophy Northern Section first round. Having made a number of fine saves, he was named man of the match, and Dolan remarked that: "he is playing as well as I have seen him and he is putting real pressure on Alan Fettis." Despite not featuring regularly for York, he spent four days on trial with Premier League club Sunderland, training with the team for three days and playing 45 minutes of a practice match against Huddersfield Town. Howarth then spent a brief period on trial with Wolverhampton Wanderers (Wolves) of the First Division in January 2002. He played for the reserve team against Huddersfield and reportedly impressed manager Dave Jones. Howarth made his first league appearance for York in over two years as a 65th-minute substitute for an injured Fettis a 3–0 home win over Bristol Rovers on 17 April 2002. Two days later, he was offered a new contract by York. With Fettis still injured for the following match, Howarth started for the first time since February 2000 in a 1–0 defeat away to Scunthorpe United on 20 April 2002, York's final match of the season. He finished the season with three appearances.

Larger clubs became interested in buying him during the summer of 2002 and he decided to consider his options before deciding on his future. He trialled with Everton in May 2002, and played in a friendly against Falkirk in the Alex Scott Memorial Trophy, keeping a clean sheet. He revealed he was interested in a move to Everton, and due to Fettis' good form for York, he decided to pursue a move. After his contract expired on 30 June 2002, Howarth joined Wolves for a second trial in July for a two-week period. After playing in Wolves' opening pre-season friendly against Morecambe, he was invited to join them for their pre-season tour of Portugal. Despite being out of contract at York, the club was entitled a fee as he was under 24 years of age, but a bid of £60,000 from Wolves was rejected. He was recalled by York to take part in a pre-season friendly against Sunderland, although he refused to participate. Howarth told Dolan he did not want to play for the club, as any potential injury could have ended his proposed transfer. His proposed move to Wolves continued until August 2002, and late that month he trained with Premier League club Tottenham Hotspur. He played in a practice match for Tottenham, but after they failed to follow up their interest in him Wolves made a bid to sign him on loan, which York rejected. After Marlon Beresford left York, and Howarth's proposed moves elsewhere fell through, he re-signed for the club in September 2002 on a week-to-week contract. Despite this, he spent two days on trial with Premier League club Newcastle United in late September 2002. Howarth's first appearance of 2002–03 came in a 4–3 away defeat to Lincoln City on 22 October 2002 in the Football League Trophy Northern Section first round, after Fettis was rested due to injury.

=== Tranmere Rovers ===
Howarth left York on 5 November 2002, signing for Second Division club Tranmere Rovers for an undisclosed five-figure fee. York chairman John Batchelor later revealed the transfer fee was an initial figure of £25,000. After signing, Howarth said: "I felt I had gone a little bit stale at York and the time was right to move on". He made his debut three weeks later in a 2–1 defeat away to Cardiff City in an FA Cup first-round replay, entering as a 72nd-minute substitute after John Achterberg was sent off. Tranmere did not concede during Howarth's 18 minutes on the pitch, and his performance was positive. However, with Achterberg established in the Tranmere goal, Howarth had to wait until 4 February 2003 to make his league debut away to Cheltenham Town, coming on as a substitute in the 57th minute after Achterberg sustained an injury. He conceded twice as Tranmere lost 3–1. Howarth returned to the substitutes' bench for the following match against Swindon Town on 8 February 2003, as Achterberg had recovered from injury. His first start for Tranmere came over two months later in a 0–0 draw away to Luton Town on 5 April 2003, after Achterberg picked up an injury in training the previous day. He kept his starting place for the following match, a 1–0 victory at home to Wycombe Wanderers on 12 April 2003. Despite keeping clean sheets in both matches, he was dropped for the next match against Notts County on 19 April 2002. He finished 2002–03 with four appearances for Tranmere.

Howarth continued to be kept out of the team in 2003–04, only making his first appearance after Achterberg was injured during the warm-up away to Swindon on 3 March 2004. Tranmere lost 2–0, although his performance was positive, making a number of good saves. However, Achterberg was declared fit for the following match against Millwall on 7 March 2004, and Howarth returned to the substitutes' bench. He did not play another match for Tranmere that season. Howarth's first appearance of 2004–05 came as a 20th-minute substitute after Achterberg was injured away to Hull City on 18 December 2004. After conceding a goal scored by Ian Ashbee in the 34th minute, Howarth was injured in a challenge with Stuart Elliott, and was substituted at half-time. He was available for Tranmere's next match against Barnsley on 26 December 2004, and with Achterberg ruled out for the Christmas period with a knee injury, he started in a 1–1 home draw. This meant Howarth had a run of nine consecutive matches in goal for Tranmere, with an appearance against Oldham Athletic in the Football League Trophy Northern semi-final on 25 January 2005 being his last before Achterberg returned against Luton on 29 January. He failed to play again that season, and was released by Tranmere on 24 May 2005.

=== Bradford City ===
On 8 June 2005, Howarth signed a two-year contract with League One club Bradford City. He was signed to provide competition for Donovan Ricketts, manager Colin Todd saying: "It was a position we needed filling badly. I am delighted to have got a keeper of Russell's calibre". Despite having the chance to affirm himself in pre-season with Ricketts away on international duty, it was Ricketts who started 2005–06 as first-choice goalkeeper. Howarth made his debut away to Rotherham United on 20 August 2005, coming on as a 27th-minute substitute after Ricketts was injured. The match finished a 1–1 draw. He made his first start in the subsequent 5–0 away victory over League Two club Rochdale in the League Cup first round on 23 August 2005. These were the first two appearances of a 12-match run in the team, before being dropped after nearly two months when Ricketts returned from injury against Port Vale on 15 October 2005. His last two appearances for Bradford that season, which came when Ricketts was suspended, were a 5–3 defeat at home to Barnsley in an FA Cup second-round replay on 13 December 2005 and a 2–1 defeat at home to Rotherham four days later. Howarth finished his first season at Bradford with a career-record 15 appearances.

After starting 2006–07 as second-choice to Ricketts, Howarth sought a loan away from Bradford for first-team football, saying: "It is approaching make or break in terms of my career. I need to start playing regularly again as soon as possible". Former club York, by this time playing in the Conference National, made a failed bid to sign him on loan in September 2006. Howarth's first and only appearance of the season, a 2–1 defeat at home to Scunthorpe in the Football League Trophy Northern Section first round on 17 October 2006, proved to be the last of his career. He was released by Bradford on 9 May 2007 and subsequently retired from professional football aged 25.

== International career ==
=== England under-16 ===
Howarth received his first international call-up when he was included in the England national under-16 team to play Turkey on 12 January 1999. He was the only player with a club from below the top two divisions to have been selected. He made his debut in the match as a 70th-minute substitute for Chelsea's Rhys Evans, with England winning 2–0. His second cap and first start came two months later in a 1–0 victory at home to Turkey on 30 March 1999. Following the match, Sky Sports commentator Brian Marwood described his performance as "outstanding".

=== England under-18 ===
Howarth's next international call-up came over a year later when being selected for the under-18s for a match against Luxembourg on 27 April 2000, this time being one of two players with clubs below the top two divisions. He debuted after coming on as a 60th-minute substitute for Evans, in a 2–0 victory for England. Howarth was then called up for a friendly with Israel on 1 September, although he did not feature as Evans was chosen to start. In September 2000, he was named in the team that would participate in a 2001 UEFA European Under-18 Championship qualifying mini-tournament hosted in Ancona, Italy. He failed to appear in the first match against Andorra on 7 October 2000, but made his first start in the next match, a 5–0 victory over the Faroe Islands on 9 October. Howarth was excluded from the line-up for the final match against Italy, which England won to progress to the intermediate qualifying round.

Howarth was called up for a friendly at home to Belgium on 16 November 2000, which he started as England won 3–2, despite Evans having seemingly established himself as the first-choice goalkeeper for the under-18s. He was included in the squad for another friendly against the Netherlands on 1 March 2001, although Evans was chosen to play ahead of Howarth. He was called into the squads to play Poland in the intermediate qualifying round, although he failed to play a part in either leg of the tie, as Evans started in both the 1–0 home loss on 22 March 2001 and the 0–0 away draw on 26 April. With Evans omitted from the squad to play away against Switzerland in a friendly on 30 May 2001, Howarth started in a 1–0 defeat. The match, in which he was substituted for Boaz Myhill of Aston Villa, proved to be his final appearance for the under-18s.

=== England under-20 ===
Howarth was ineligible to play for the under-19 team due to an alteration to the England set-up, and was subsequently called up for the under-20 match against Portugal at home on 21 November 2001. The match was England's first at under-20 level since the 1999 FIFA World Youth Championship. He started the match and was substituted for Myhill at half-time, with the team winning 1–0. Howarth came on for England as a half-time substitute for Evans in a 3–0 home victory over Finland on 13 March 2002, in their penultimate friendly ahead of the 2002 Toulon Tournament. A call-up came for the final friendly away to Portugal on 10 April 2002, and he entered as a half-time substitute, this time for Myhill.

After originally being left out the squad, he was given a last-minute call-up to play at the Toulon Tournament in May 2002, after Stephen Bywater was called up for the under-21 team. Howarth did not play in the first group match against Poland on 10 May 2002 as Bywater started, but in the second match against Portugal he was chosen ahead of Evans in a 1–0 victory over Portugal on 12 May. However, he was dropped for the final group match against Brazil on 14 May 2002 to make way for Evans, who also played in England's final match in the tournament against Japan on 17 May.

=== England under-21 ===
Shortly after the under-20s' elimination from the Toulon Tournament, Howarth was called up for the under-21 team playing in the 2002 UEFA European Under-21 Championship after Bywater and Evans picked up injuries. He was an unused substitute for England's final two group matches against Italy and Portugal, and after losing both of these matches the team was eliminated. He was recalled by the under-21s for a match against Yugoslavia on 6 September 2002, although Liverpool's Chris Kirkland started. He was included in the squad for the under-21s' next match against Slovakia on 11 October 2002 in qualification Group 7 of the 2004 UEFA European Under-21 Championship and, despite Kirkland being injured, failed to play as Wolves' Matt Murray was selected. For the following qualifier against Macedonia on 15 October 2002, Howarth failed to make the substitutes' bench. Following his move to Tranmere his international call-ups continued, and he was selected for a get-together of the under-21s in November 2002, ahead of their 2004 UEFA European Under-21 Championship qualifiers against Portugal and Turkey in March and April 2003. However, he did not play in either match, with Bywater and Murray starting. He was given a late call-up to the squad for qualifiers against Macedonia and Portugal in September, but did not eventually meet up with the team as an agreement was reached that he would only be on standby.

== Post-football ==
Following his retirement from football, Howarth became a paramedic. He became a coach for City Football Development in August 2009, which was set up to offer coaching to youngsters in York.

== Personal life ==
Howarth has been an Everton supporter since the early 1990s. His girlfriend Victoria worked as a deputy head teacher and while Howarth was a Tranmere player the couple lived on the Wirral. Their daughter, Georgia May, was born in late 2004. After signing for Bradford in 2005, Howarth briefly lived with his parents in Riccall before purchasing a second home in Halifax, West Yorkshire to live in with his partner.

== Career statistics ==
Appearances and goals by club, season and competition
Club	Season	League			FA Cup		League Cup		Other		Total	
Club	Season	Division	Apps	Goals	Apps	Goals	Apps	Goals	Apps	Goals	Apps	Goals
York City	1999–2000	Third Division	6	0	0	0	2	0	0	0	8	0
York City	2000–01	Third Division	0	0	0	0	1	0	1 (Note: Appearance in Football League Trophy)	0	2	0
York City	2001–02	Third Division	2	0	0	0	0	0	1	0	3	0
York City	2002–03	Third Division	0	0	—		0	0	1	0	1	0
York City	Total		8	0	0	0	3	0	3	0	14	0
Tranmere Rovers	2002–03	Second Division	3	0	1	0	—		—		4	0
Tranmere Rovers	2003–04	Second Division	1	0	0	0	0	0	0	0	1	0
Tranmere Rovers	2004–05	League One	8	0	0	0	0	0	1	0	9	0
Tranmere Rovers	Total		12	0	1	0	0	0	1	0	14	0
Bradford City	2005–06	League One	11	0	1	0	2	0	1	0	15	0
Bradford City	2006–07	League One	0	0	0	0	0	0	1	0	1	0
Bradford City	Total		11	0	1	0	2	0	2	0	16	0
Career total			31	0	2	0	5	0	6	0	44	0
