= Osgodby, Barlby with Osgodby =

Village and civil parish in North Yorkshire, England

Coordinates: 53.793823°N 1.022339°W

Osgodby
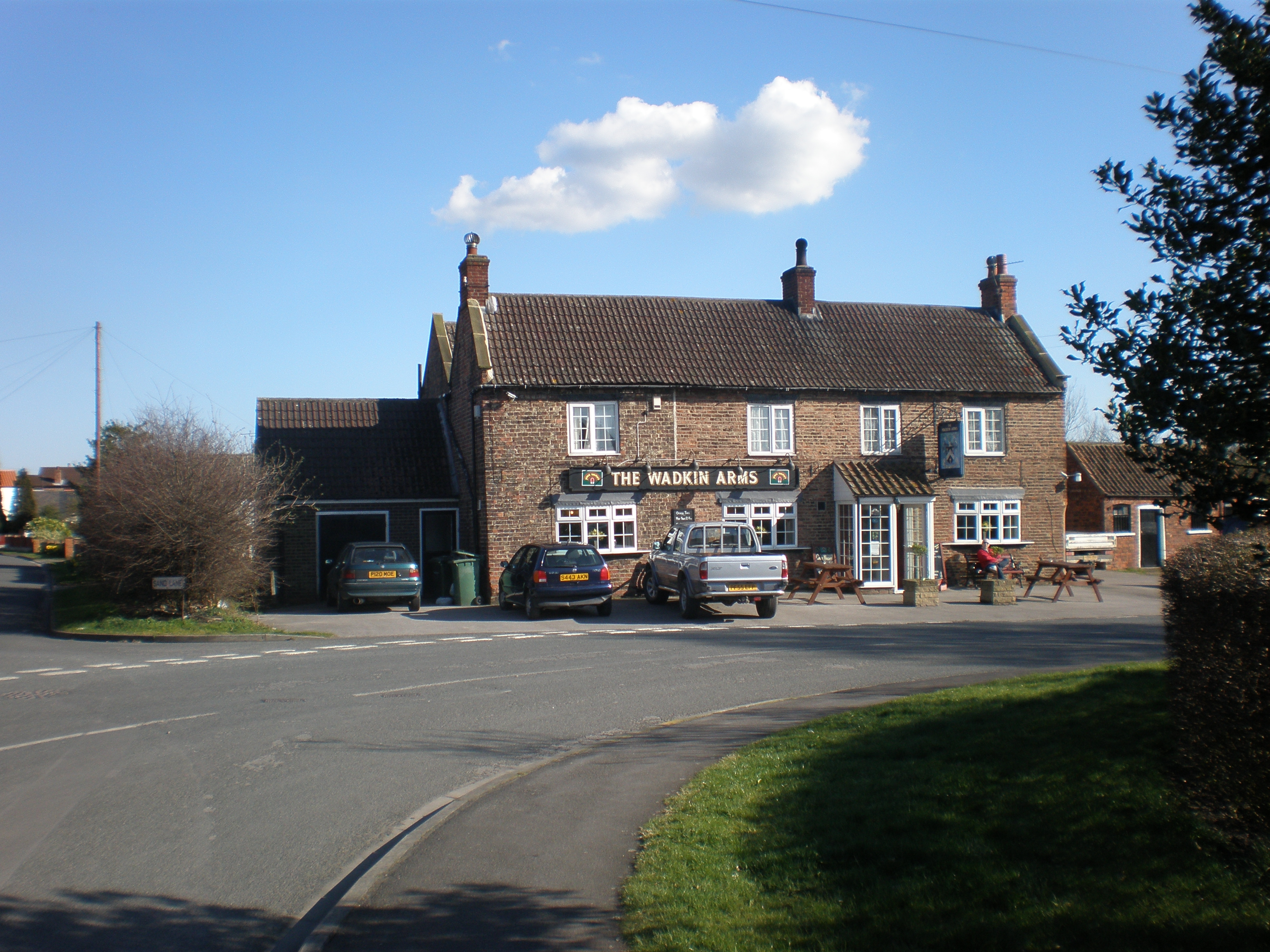
- The Wadkin Arms, Osgodby

- Location within North Yorkshire
- OS grid reference: SE645335
- Civil parish: Barlby with Osgodby
- Unitary authority: North Yorkshire
- Ceremonial county: North Yorkshire
- Region: Yorkshire and the Humber
- Country: England
- Sovereign state: United Kingdom
- Post town: SELBY
- Postcode district: YO8
- Police: North Yorkshire
- Fire: North Yorkshire
- Ambulance: Yorkshire

Osgodby is a village in the civil parish of Barlby with Osgodby, in North Yorkshire, England, 2 miles (3.2 km) from Selby.

Its neighbouring village is Barlby, which lies directly to the west. The village play area has climbing frames, swings, a slide and a football pitch. There is an Indian takeaway, a builder's merchant, and hairdressing salon. It also has a large garden centre and a country pub called 'The Wadkin Arms'.

There is a pond opposite the village play area. It has a bench and a balcony. There is currently a family of moorhens that inhabit the village pond.

Osgodby used to have a village shop, near the Barlby junction, but this is now a residential property

The hamlet of Osgodby Common lies due north at grid reference SE646354.

== History ==
The toponym is from an Old Norse personal name Asgaut, with the Old Danish suffix -by ("farm" or "village"), thus "Asgaut's farm". The place is mentioned in the Domesday Book.

In the Middle Ages the village was in the Ouse and Derwent wapentake of the East Riding of Yorkshire, and a township in the large ancient parish of Hemingbrough. It became a separate civil parish in 1866. On 1 April 1935 the civil parish was abolished and merged with the parish of Barlby. In 1931 the parish had a population of 294.

In 1974 Osgodby was transferred from the East Riding to the new county of North Yorkshire. From 1974 to 2023 it was part of the Selby District, it is now administered by the unitary North Yorkshire Council.

== See also ==
- Listed buildings in Barlby with Osgodby
