= Listed buildings in Barlby with Osgodby =

Barlby with Osgodby is a civil parish in the county of North Yorkshire, England. It contains eight listed buildings that are recorded in the National Heritage List for England. All the listed buildings are designated at Grade II, the lowest of the three grades, which is applied to "buildings of national importance and special interest". The parish contains the village of Barlby, the smaller village of Osgodby, and the surrounding area. The listed buildings consist of houses, farmhouses, a church, a former vicarage, a railway swing bridge, and a former munitions depot.

== Buildings ==
Name and location	Photograph	Date	Notes
Bank View Farmhouse; 53.78605°N 1.06500°W	—	Early 18th century	The house, later divided into three dwellings, is in a reddish-brown brick on a rendered plinth, with a floor band, and a roof in pantile and stone slate with stone coping and kneelers. There are two storeys, three bays, and a rear range. On the front is a round-arched porch, and the windows are sashes, in the ground floor they have soldier and header arches, and in the upper floor they are horizontally-sliding with elliptical and cambered heads.
Church Farm; 53.79955°N 1.04191°W		Early 18th century (probable)	The house is in pinkish-brown brick with a pantile roof, hipped on the left. There are two storeys and an L-shaped plan, with a front range of five bays. The doorway is in the centre, and the windows are sashes, with wedge lintels in the ground floor, and with flat rubbed brick arches in the upper floor.
Barlby Hall; 53.80034°N 1.04342°W		Mid 18th century (probable)	The house is in brick, red at the front and reddish-brown elsewhere, with stone dressings, a floor band, a moulded cornice, and a hipped Welsh slate roof. There are two storeys and three bays, the middle bay projecting under a moulded pediment. Steps lead up to the central doorway that has a reeded architrave, a decorative fanlight and a keystone. The windows are sashes with wedge lintels and keystones.
All Saints' Church; 53.79881°N 1.04165°W		Mid to late 18th century	The church is in pinkish-brown brick with red brick dressings, and has a roof of pantile and stone slate. It consists of a three-bay nave with a west porch, and a recessed two-bay chancel with a north vestry. At the west end is an octagonal wooden bell turret with ogee-headed openings, a dentilled cornice and a domed lead roof, and on the chancel is a brick bell turret. Most of the windows have round-arched heads.
The Old Vicarage; 53.80185°N 1.03931°W	—	Mid to late 18th century	The vicarage, later a private house, is in pinkish-brown brick with dressings in red brick and stone, a stripped and dentilled eaves band, and a pantile roof with stone coping and kneelers. There are two storeys and four bays. On the front is a porch, and the windows are casements, those in the ground floor with red rubbed brick arches and stone keystones, and in the upper floor with header arches.
Grove Farmhouse; 53.80241°N 1.03932°W		Early to mid 19th century	A farmhouse later used for other purposes, it is in rendered brick, with overhanging eaves on wooden brackets, and a hipped Welsh slate roof. There are two storeys and three bays, the middle bay slightly recessed. In the centre is a doorcase with pilasters, a frieze and a pediment, and a door with a blocked fanlight. The windows are sashes in moulded architraves, the window above the doorway with a pediment.
Selby Railway Swing Bridge; 53.78418°N 1.06227°W		1888–91	The bridge was built by the North Eastern Railway to carry its line over the River Ouse. It consists of a swing bridge in wrought iron, and a hydraulic accumulator tower and engine house in brick with Welsh slate roofs. The bridge has two river spans, two smaller spans to the south and one to the north, and in the centre is a pair of tubular piers with cutwaters. The tower has two storeys and is about 7.6 metres (25 ft) high, and the engine house has a single storey and a basement, and five bays.
Former War Department munitions depot 53.78953°N 1.03817°W		1889	A group of buildings in brick with sandstone dressings and roofs in corrugated sheeting. The oldest building is a gunpowder magazine in a walled enclosure. The other buildings include a guard block, a transhipment shed, other sheds and stores, and a terrace of three houses. The houses are in brick, partly pebbledashed, with courses in blue engineering brick, including a dentilled eaves course. The gables have stone coping and kneelers, and the windows are sashes.
