= Barlby High School =

Community school in North Yorkshire, England

Coordinates: 53°48′13.8″N 1°02′23.1″W

Location
- York Road; Barlby; North Yorkshire, YO8 5JP; England

Information
- Type: Academy
- Established: 1960
- Local authority: North Yorkshire Council
- Trust: Hope Sentamu Learning Trust
- Department for Education URN: 144929 Tables
- Ofsted: Reports
- Headteacher: Anouska Gardner
- Gender: Mixed
- Age: 11 to 16
- Enrolment: 543
- Capacity: 750
- Website: http://bhs.hslt.academy

Barlby High School is a mixed secondary school located in Barlby, North Yorkshire, England. The school opened in 1960.

Previously a community school administered by North Yorkshire County Council, in September 2017 Barlby High School converted to academy status and is now sponsored by the Hope Sentamu Learning Trust.

The school offers GCSEs and BTECs as programmes of study for pupils.

== Notable former pupils ==
- Russell Howarth, former footballer
