= Barlby =

Village in North Yorkshire, England

Coordinates: 53°48′02″N 1°02′22″W

- Village
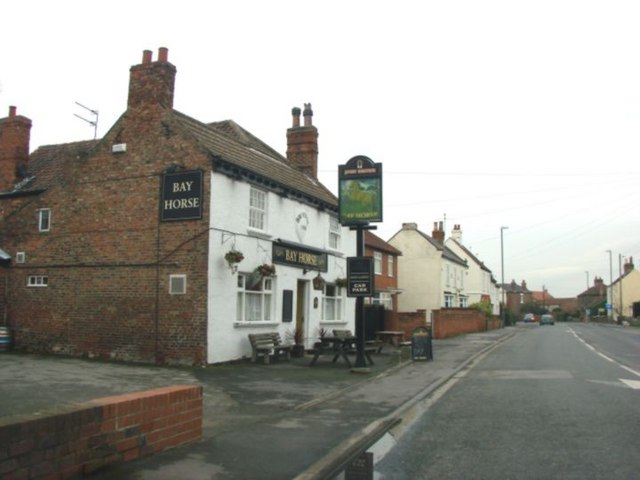
- York Road

- Location within North Yorkshire
- OS grid reference: SE635344
  - London: 160 mi (260 km) SE
- Civil parish: Barlby with Osgodby
- Unitary authority: North Yorkshire
- Ceremonial county: North Yorkshire
- Region: Yorkshire and the Humber
- Country: England
- Sovereign state: United Kingdom
- Post town: SELBY
- Postcode district: YO8
- Dialling code: 01757
- Police: North Yorkshire
- Fire: North Yorkshire
- Ambulance: Yorkshire
- UK Parliament: Selby

Barlby is a village in the civil parish of Barlby with Osgodby, in North Yorkshire, England. It lies on the east bank of the River Ouse, opposite Selby, within the Vale of York, a flat and low-lying landscape shaped by rivers and arable farming. Since 1 April 2023 the area has been administered by the unitary North Yorkshire Council.

Barlby was recorded in the Domesday Book of 1086. The parish contains several listed buildings, including All Saints’ Church and Barlby Hall, and it also includes the Selby Railway Swing Bridge and the former War Department munitions depot at Magazine Farm. The village and surrounding area experienced major flooding in November 2000 during widespread floods on the lower Ouse.

For Westminster elections Barlby is in the Selby constituency created for the 2024 general election.

== Geography and environment ==
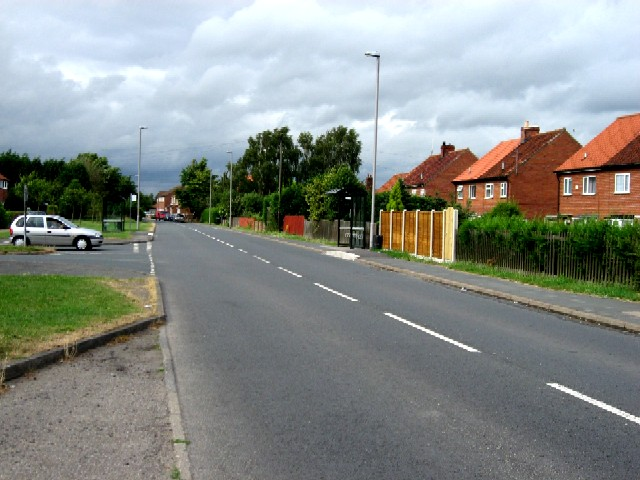
York Road, Barlby

Barlby is located on the east bank of the River Ouse opposite Selby, in the flat, low-lying landscape of the Vale of York. The surrounding countryside has fertile soils and is largely in arable use, with rivers draining south towards the Humber basin.

The village has a linear form focused on Barlby Road along the former A19 corridor, with the Barlby Bridge area laid out as a grid of Edwardian terraces beside the river. Employment uses lie south of the main road, reflecting long-standing riverside industry and storage.

Much of the parish lies on functional floodplain and managed low ground. Drainage is aided by local internal drainage boards, including the Ouse and Derwent Internal Drainage Board. Strategic flood risk assessments identify high-risk zones along the Ouse, and the Environment Agency maintains a flood warning area covering parts of Selby and Barlby from Landing Lane to the A19 bridge.

== History ==
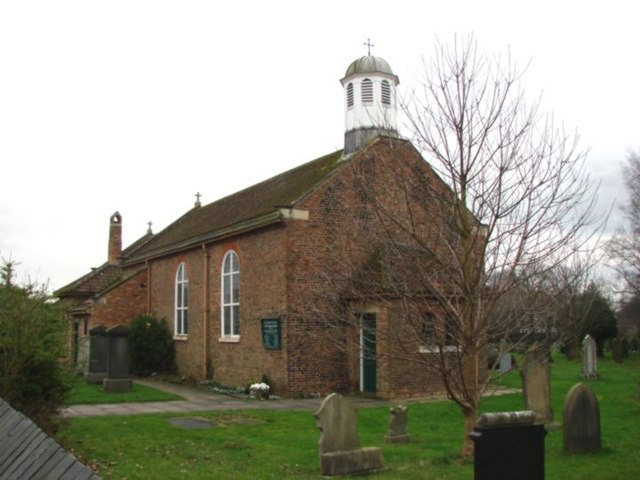
The Church of All Saints

=== Origins and name ===
Barlby was recorded in the Domesday Book as a small settlement in the hundred of Howden. The entry notes two tenurial holdings in 1086. The place-name is explained by the University of Nottingham’s Key to English Place-Names as an Old Norse personal name plus the Old Danish suffix ‘‘-by’’, meaning a farm or village.

=== Medieval township and parish ===
In the Middle Ages Barlby was a township and chapelry within the large ancient parish of Hemingbrough, in the Ouse and Derwent wapentake. Vision of Britain summarises that administrative relationship and the later emergence of a separate civil parish in the nineteenth century.

=== Eighteenth century church and village focus ===
The present parish church of All Saints’ dates from 1779 to 1780 and became a local landmark beside the road to Selby.

=== Military and wartime ===
The parish includes a former War Department munitions depot at Magazine Farm on Magazine Road. It was built in 1889 as a gunpowder magazine and linked by a siding to the Selby to Market Weighton railway, then expanded in 1890. Early Ordnance Survey mapping shows a central magazine within a walled enclosure, a rail transhipment shed, a guard block and a terrace of three houses for Metropolitan Police officers who guarded the site.

By 1905 the complex had an internal tramway and additional storehouses. Buildings mapped in 1938 and surviving painted signage, including markings for small arms ammunition, indicate Second World War use. The depot remained in Ministry of Defence hands into the 1970s and was later sold and adapted for agricultural purposes. During the First World War a nearby chemical works on Barlby Road operated as a Trench Warfare Filling Factory and may have used the magazine for storage.

=== Riverside mills and food manufacturing ===
From the early twentieth century the riverside at Barlby developed as an industrial corridor. Aerial photographs from September 1932 show the large Olympia Oil and Cake Mills complex on the east bank of the Ouse beside Barlby Road. The works later traded as British Oil & Cake Mills and then BOCM Pauls, and planning papers in 2012 still referred to the “existing BOCM Pauls Ltd Olympia Mill” on Barlby Road, confirming continued use of the site. The firm’s workforce is commemorated on a company war memorial recorded by the Imperial War Museums.

Food manufacturing also took root along the same corridor. The local plan identified a Hazlewood Foods factory at Barlby near the A19 roundabout, next to the BOCM site, and described established employment uses south of the main road. In January 2001 Greencore completed the acquisition of Hazlewood Foods, with trade press later that year reporting Hazlewood moving bottling of sauces and dressings to its Selby site. Greencore now lists a Selby facility on Barlby Road that produces ambient grocery products such as sauces and pickles.

From 1953 British Oil and Cake Mills also ran a research and testing centre at Barlby Farm on the edge of the village. The station carried out dairy bull progeny testing and later sire performance trials, with geneticist Pat Bichan as its first manager. BOCM issued a series of technical bulletins under the title “Bull progeny test, Barlby farm, Selby, Yorks”, and a 1967 multi-centre study of pig feeding lists “Barlby Farm, Selby, Yorks (B.O.C.M.)” among the participating sites.

=== Railways ===
To the west of the village the Selby Railway Swing Bridge carries the Hull–Selby line across the River Ouse. The present wrought-iron swing bridge with a hydraulic tower and engine house was completed in 1891 for the North Eastern Railway and is listed at Grade II on the National Heritage List for England.

East of the village a branch diverged towards Market Weighton from the Selby area. The line from Selby to Market Weighton opened on 1 August 1848 and closed to regular passenger services on 20 September 1954, with closure to goods following in the 1960s.

Main line trains between York and Doncaster were diverted away from the Selby route in 1983 when the Selby Diversion opened to avoid mining subsidence risks from the developing Selby Coalfield. The diversion was promoted through Parliament and authorised by British Railways private legislation, with the need and route discussed in Commons debates in 1978.

=== Administrative changes and recent events ===
Barlby became a separate civil parish in 1866, on 1 April 1935 the civil parish of Osgodby was abolished and merged with Barlby, on 2 March 1999 the merged parish was renamed "Barlby with Osgodby". In 1931 the parish of Barlby (prior to the merge) had a population of 2627. The area experienced major flooding in November 2000 during widespread floods on the lower Ouse. A new roundabout at the A19 and A63 junction at Barlby opened in May 2013, replacing the former crossroads and linking to the Selby bypass.

== Governance ==
Barlby forms part of the civil parish of Barlby with Osgodby. Local services at the first tier of government are provided by Barlby and Osgodby Town Council, which meets at the Barlby Library and Community Hub. Since 1 April 2023 the area has been administered by the unitary North Yorkshire Council.

For national representation Barlby lies in the Selby constituency created for the 2024 general election following the 2023 boundary review. Within North Yorkshire Council the parish falls across electoral divisions that include Barlby and Riccall, Cliffe and North Duffield, and Selby East.

== Demography ==
At the 2021 Census the civil parish of Barlby with Osgodby had 5,566 usual residents, up from 4,974 in 2011 and 4,533 in 2001. The 2021 age profile included 1,086 people aged under 18 and 1,021 aged 65 and over. For earlier census series see the parish profiles published by the Office for National Statistics.

== Economy ==
Barlby’s economy is closely linked to nearby Selby, with employment focused along Barlby Road beside the river. Planning documents describe the Barlby Bridge area as a grid of housing with established employment uses to the south of the main road, and identify riverside land at Magazine Road and adjacent plots for employment development.

Food manufacturing is a feature of the local corridor. Greencore operates a site on Barlby Road that produces ambient grocery products such as cooking sauces and pickles. The company lists the Selby business unit at Barlby Road, YO8 5BJ, and describes its focus on ambient grocery lines.

Riverside industry has a longer history. Aerial photography from September 1932 shows the Olympia Oil and Cake Mills complex at Barlby on the east bank of the Ouse. The site later formed part of British Oil & Cake Mills and BOCM Pauls, with planning papers in 2012 referring to the “existing BOCM Pauls Ltd Olympia Mill” on Barlby Road.

== Transport ==
Barlby stands on the junction of the A19 and A63 at the Barlby Roundabout, which opened in May 2013 to replace the former at-grade crossroads. The junction links the village with the Selby bypass and routes towards York and Howden.

The nearest railway station is Selby, which has services on routes to York, Hull and Leeds.

Local buses connect Barlby with Selby and York. Arriva Yorkshire operates service 415 between Selby, Barlby, Riccall and York, with route and timetable information published by the operator and by North Yorkshire Council.

The diversion of the East Coast Main Line in 1983 moved long-distance services off the former route through Selby, following authorisation in the late 1970s to protect planned coal extraction in the Selby area.

== Landmarks and heritage ==
The parish contains a number of listed buildings. The parish church of All Saints’ dates from 1779 to 1780 and is listed at Grade II on the National Heritage List for England.

Domestic buildings include Barlby Hall on York Road, a mid eighteenth-century house listed at Grade II. The Old Vicarage on York Road and Abbey Lea on the same road are also listed at Grade II.

Agricultural buildings reflect the surrounding farmland. Bank View Farmhouse on Bank Road and Church Farm on York Road are both listed at Grade II.

Transport and defence structures form a second strand of local heritage. The Selby Railway Swing Bridge of 1891, with its hydraulic tower and engine house, is listed at Grade II for its engineering interest. On Magazine Road the former War Department munitions depot at Magazine Farm, established in 1889 and disused in the 1970s, is listed at Grade II.

== Education ==
Primary education in the village is provided by Barlby Community Primary School on Hilltop, which caters for pupils aged 3 to 11. The most recent full inspection by Ofsted took place in October 2023, with the report published on 16 November 2023.

Secondary education is provided by Barlby High School on York Road, a mixed 11 to 16 academy within the Heartwood Learning Trust. Ofsted carried out a full inspection in April 2023 and a follow-up monitoring visit was published in September 2024. The school does not have a sixth form.

Post-16 education is available locally at Selby’s further education college, commonly known as Selby College, which offers A levels, T Levels, vocational courses and apprenticeships. Since March 2022 the college has formed part of the Heart of Yorkshire Education Group.

== Flooding ==
Barlby lies on functional floodplain beside the River Ouse, and parts of the parish fall within an Environment Agency flood warning area that covers Selby and Barlby from Landing Lane to the A19 bridge. Strategic assessments for the former Selby district identify high-risk zones along the Ouse and set out planning guidance for managing development in areas at risk.

In November 2000 the lower Ouse catchment experienced very high river levels after prolonged rainfall. The Environment Agency recorded major flooding in Barlby, and a House of Commons debate the following January reported that defences were over-topped in Selby and Barlby and that about 300 properties were flooded. National press at the time described evacuations in Barlby and widespread disruption to power and transport locally.

Following the 2000 floods the Environment Agency published a formal post-incident review. Local mapping prepared in 2008 notes that substantial flood defences were in place on the banks of the Ouse at Barlby. The area remains covered by an Environment Agency flood warning service for future incidents.

== See also ==
- Listed buildings in Barlby with Osgodby

== Gallery ==
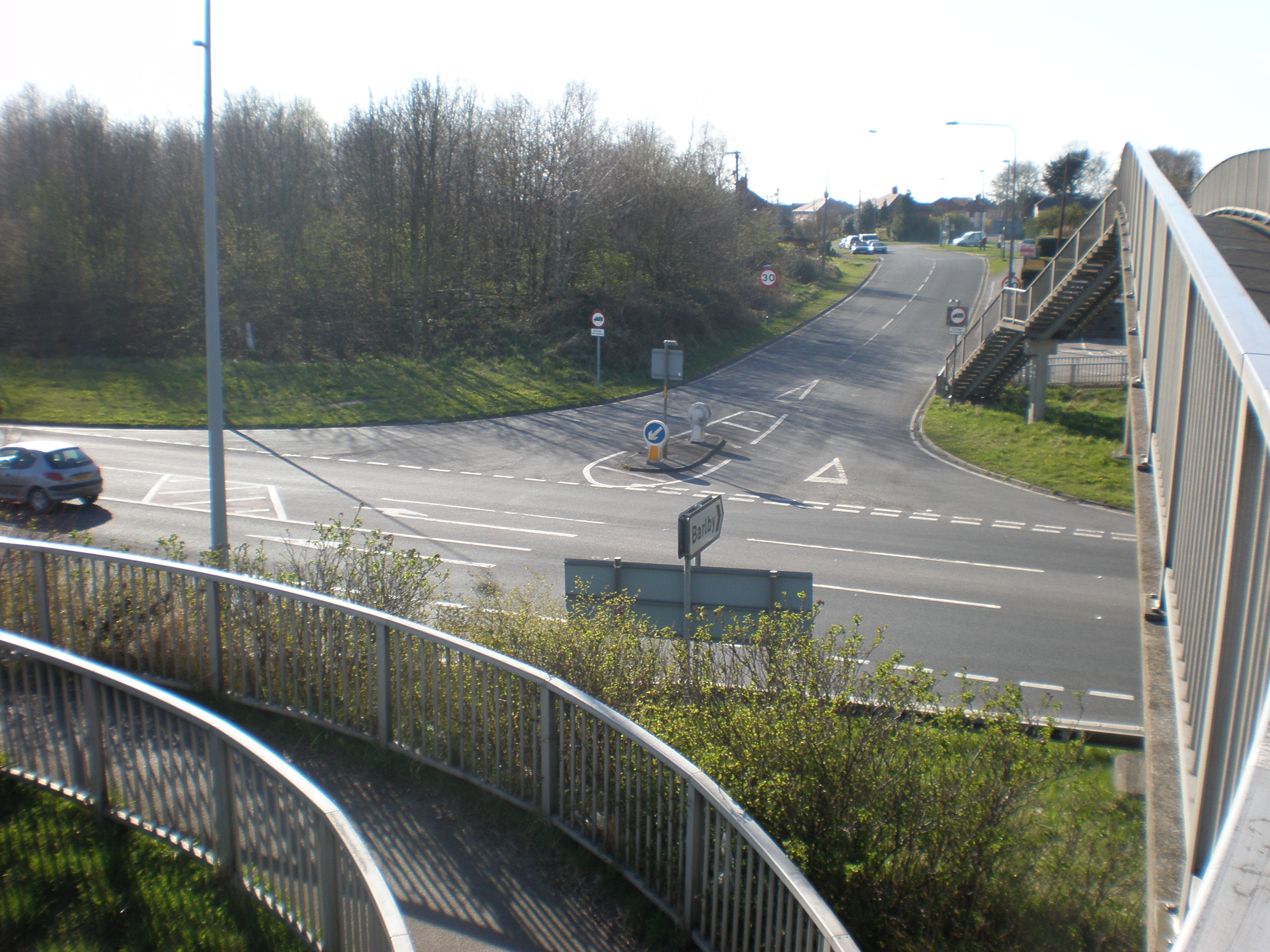
The access bridge over the A19 to Osgodby

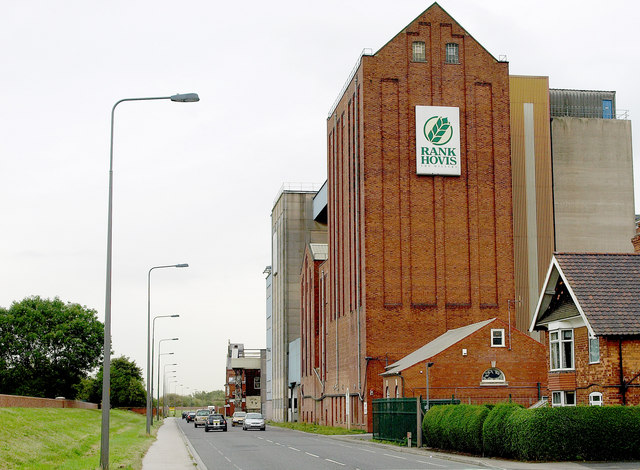
Rank Hovis Mill

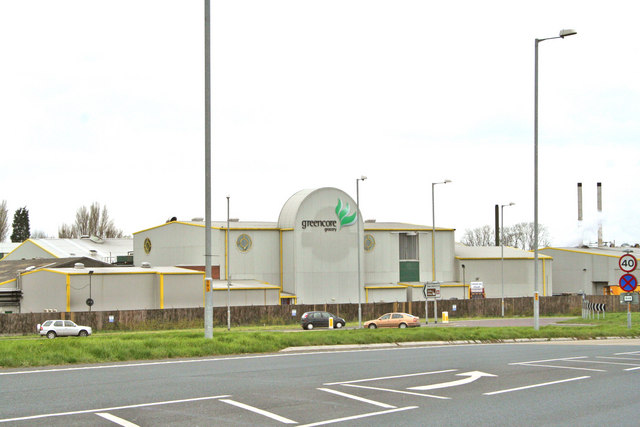
Selby Pickle Factory
