= Misericord =

Wooden shelf on the underside of a folding seat in a church

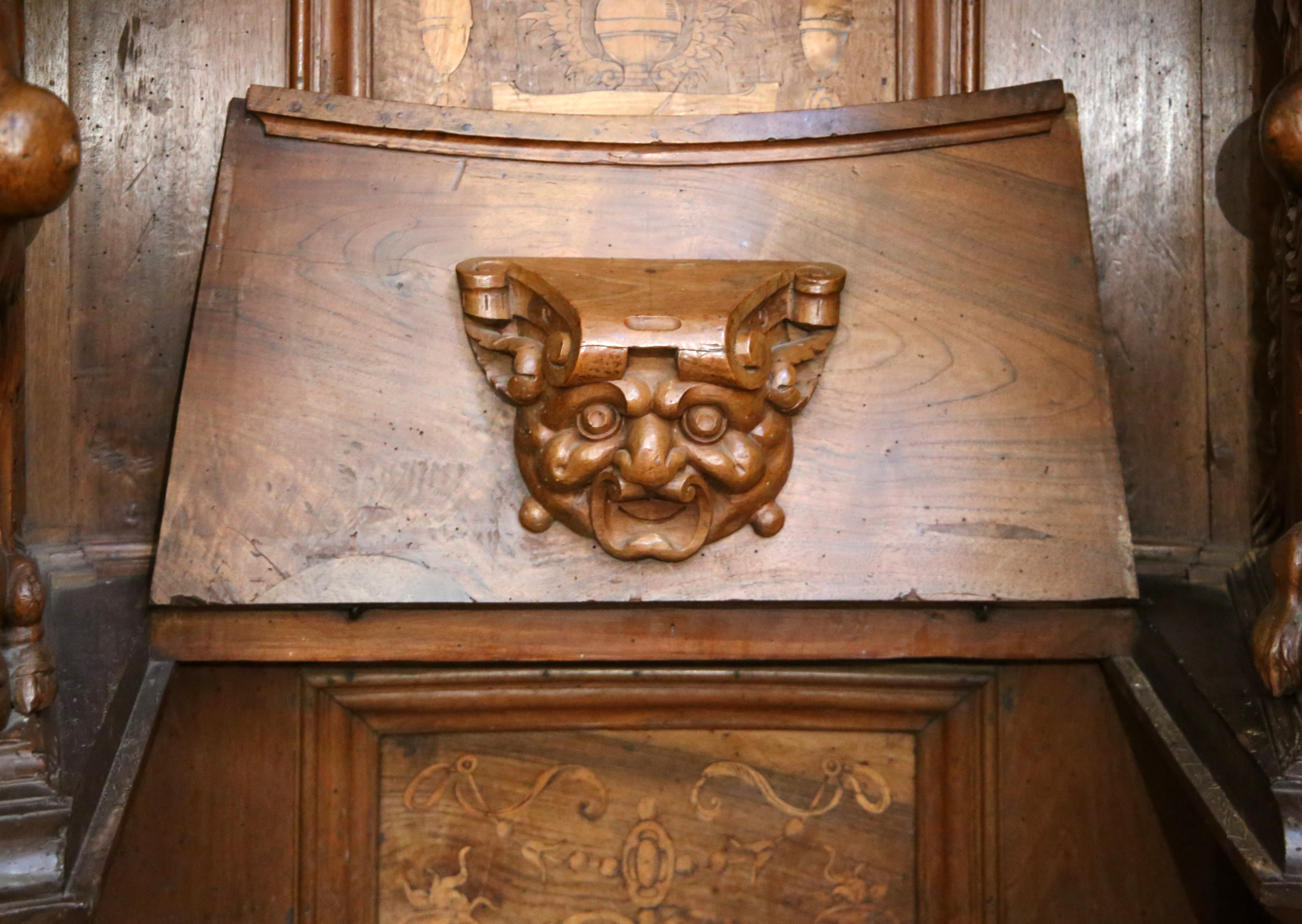
Misericord from the Charterhouse of Florence (Tuscany, Italy), depicting a mascaron (a decorative face)

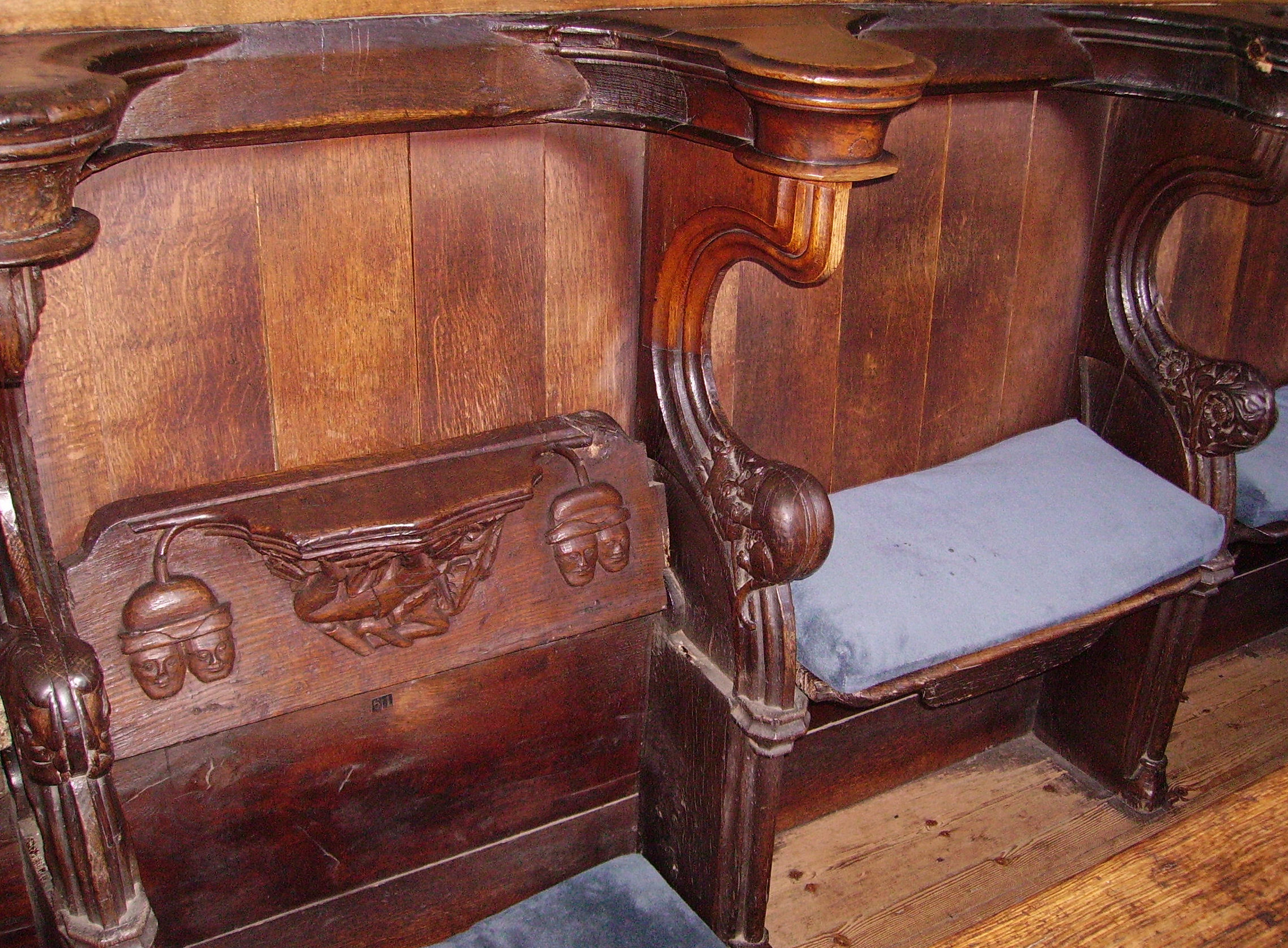
With the seat lifted (as at left), the misericord provides a ledge to support the user.

A misericord (sometimes named mercy seat, like the biblical object, sometimes misericordia) is a small wooden structure (a sort of shelf) on the underside of a hinged folding seat in a church which, when the seat (or 'stall') is folded up, is intended to act as a ledge to support a person leaning against it in a partially standing position during long periods of prayer. They are usually wooden, often intricately and artistically carved, and have been created and used since at least the 11th century AD. Misericords are most often found under the stalls in the part of a church named the 'choir', close to the altar, as well as in the churches of or attached to monastic communities.

== Origins ==
Prayers in the early medieval church at the daily divine offices (i.e. Matins, Lauds, Prime, Terce, Sext, None, Vespers, and Compline) were said standing with uplifted hands. The old or infirm could use crutches or, as time went on, a misericordia (literally 'pity of the heart', to create an act of mercy). For these times of required standing, seating was constructed so that the seats could be turned up. However, the undersides sometimes had a small shelf, a misericord, allowing the user to lean against it, slightly reducing their discomfort. Like most other medieval woodwork in churches, they were usually skillfully carved and often show detailed scenes, even though they were hidden underneath the seats, especially in the choir stalls of the choir around the altar. Despite being located in churches, it was not considered appropriate for these sculptures to portray religious motifs, as people rested their buttocks against them. As such, misericords portrayed a wide range of subjects from secular life and folklore unrelated to the Bible.

== History ==
The earliest mention of the misericord dates to the 11th century. Surviving misericords in English churches date from the start of the 13th century right up until the 21st century, although after the beginning of the 17th century they are viewed as modern copies with little or no historical importance. Remnant's 1969 catalogue dismisses everything after that date as "modern", rarely even affording it a description, but there are many wonderful carvings from the Victorian era, and even the modern day. The earliest set of misericords can be found in the choir stalls of Exeter Cathedral and date from the middle of the 13th century. Slightly earlier individual examples are present at Christchurch Priory and St Mary the Virgin, Hemingbrough in North Yorkshire. The vast majority of English misericords date from the 14th and 15th centuries and are most often depictions of secular or pagan images and scenes, entirely at odds with the Christian iconography and aesthetic that surround them.

Many stalls with misericords were once part of monastic or collegiate churches, but during the English Reformation and the dissolution of the Catholic monasteries, many were either destroyed or broken up to be dispersed amongst now protestant parish churches. Those that survived were further depleted by 17th-century iconoclasts and Victorian reformers. One set at Chester was destroyed by Dean Howson because he deemed it improper, although 43 of the original medieval scenes remain. The woodcarvers came from Lincoln in the late 14th century and moved on to Westminster Hall when they had finished the choir, three years later. It is said that it was the apprentices who were allowed to carve the seats, while the masters did the more impressive works.

== Eastern Orthodox use ==
Misericords are found to this day on kathismata, the choir stalls used by Eastern Orthodox monastics. These tend to be much simpler than their Western counterparts, usually being a simple strip of rounded wood with little or no ornamentation. Their use is very common in the Greek Orthodox Church, though Russian Orthodox monasteries tend not to have individual choir stalls, but simple benches for the brethren to sit on. Orthodox Christians stand throughout the long divine services, rather than sit or kneel, though some seating is provided for the elderly and infirm. Whereas Greek monks will tend to lean in their stalls during the services, Russian monks usually stand upright.

== Misericord (room) ==
A distinct (but related) use of the word is to denote a room in a medieval Benedictine monastery where some part of the community, especially those who were sick or infirm, would eat on any given day. The Rule of Saint Benedict included strict rules on the food allowed for monks in the refectory: for example, it provided for a complete ban on the meat of four-legged animals except for the sick. In a late medieval monastery, a schedule would send half of all monks to dine in the refectory, and the other half to the misericord, where the refectory rules were not in effect and they could indulge in meat. At Westminster Abbey, which began its life as part of a large Benedictine monastery, the misericord was constructed sometime between 1230 and 1270.

== Cultural impact ==
As the 'hidden' position and 'vernacular' iconography of misericords have prompted them to be seen as a subversive art-form, they have re-appeared as motifs in modern art and literature.

== Gallery ==
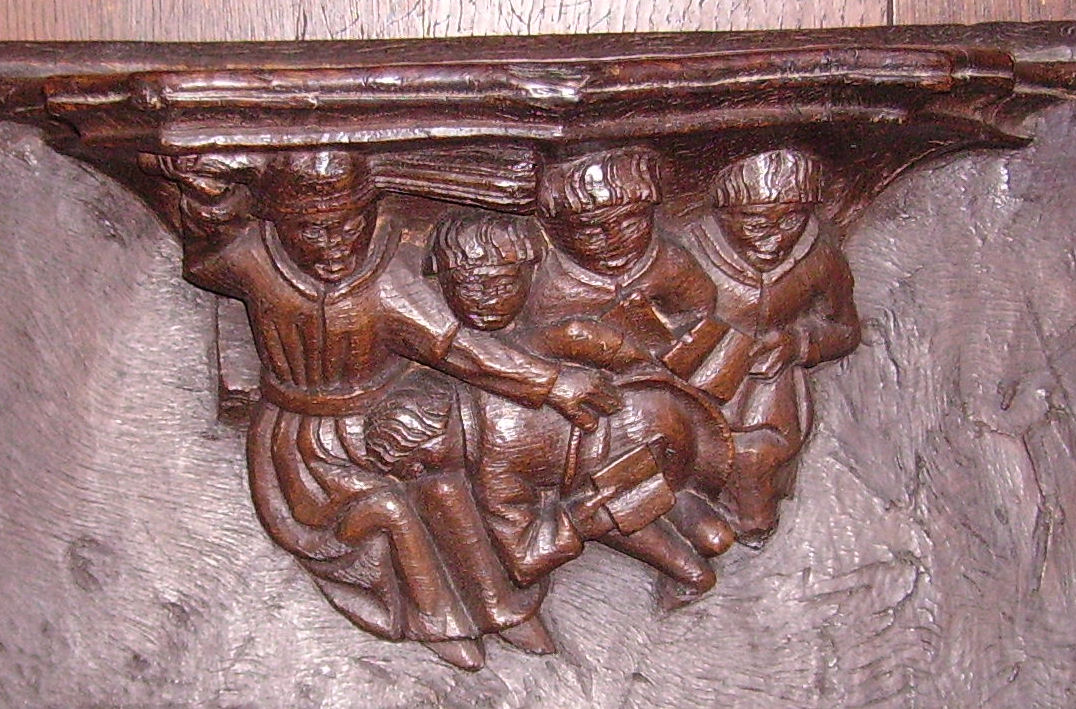
St Botolph's Church, Boston, Lincolnshire: a school-master thrashing a pupil

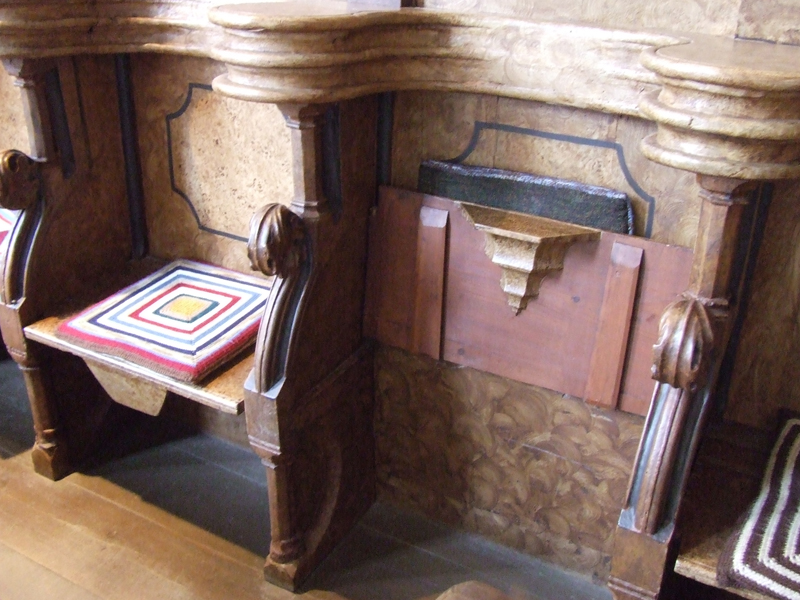
A simple bracket-like misericord, Bechtolsheim, Germany

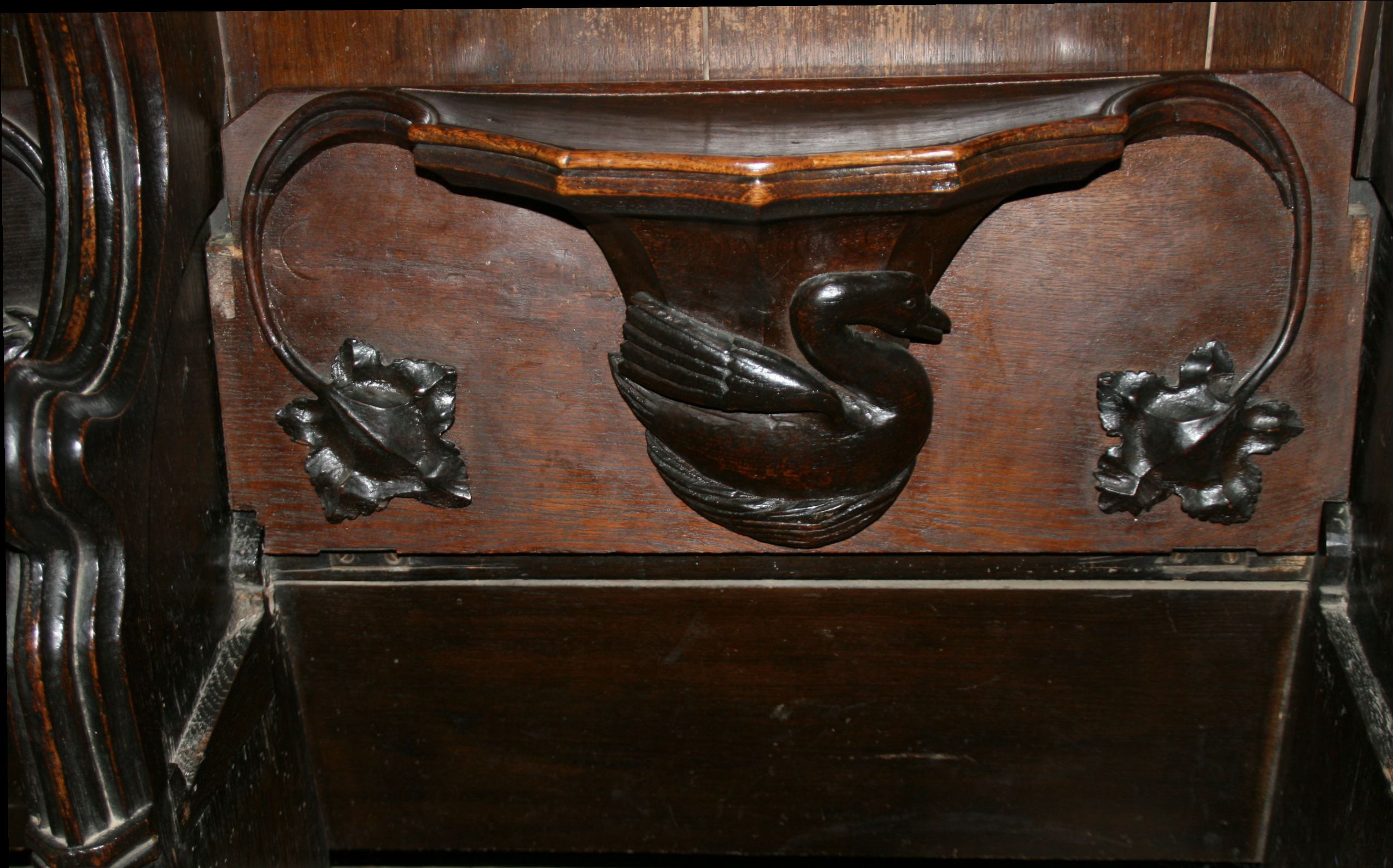
Magdalen College, Oxford: a swan, flanked by foliate "supporters"

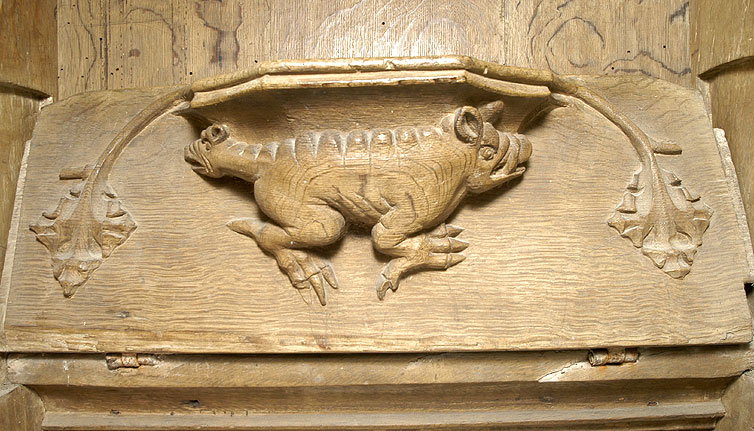
St Mary's Church, Edlesborough, Buckinghamshire, showing an amphisbaena

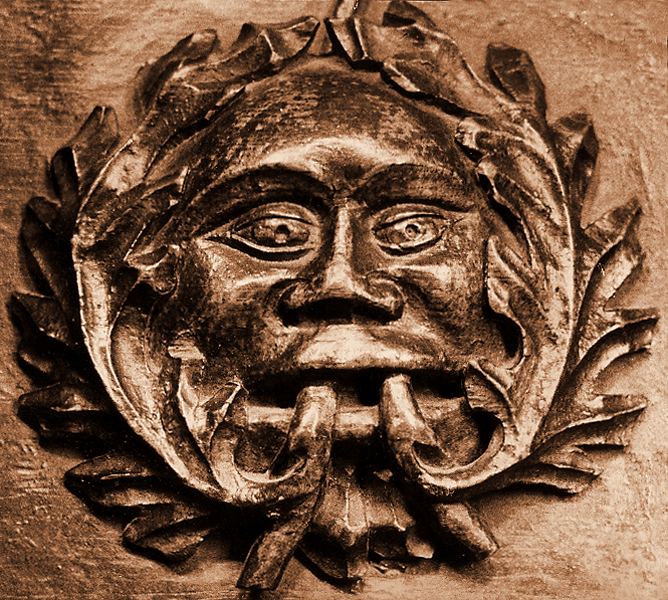
Detail of a misericord from St Laurence Church, Ludlow, Shropshire, showing a Green Man

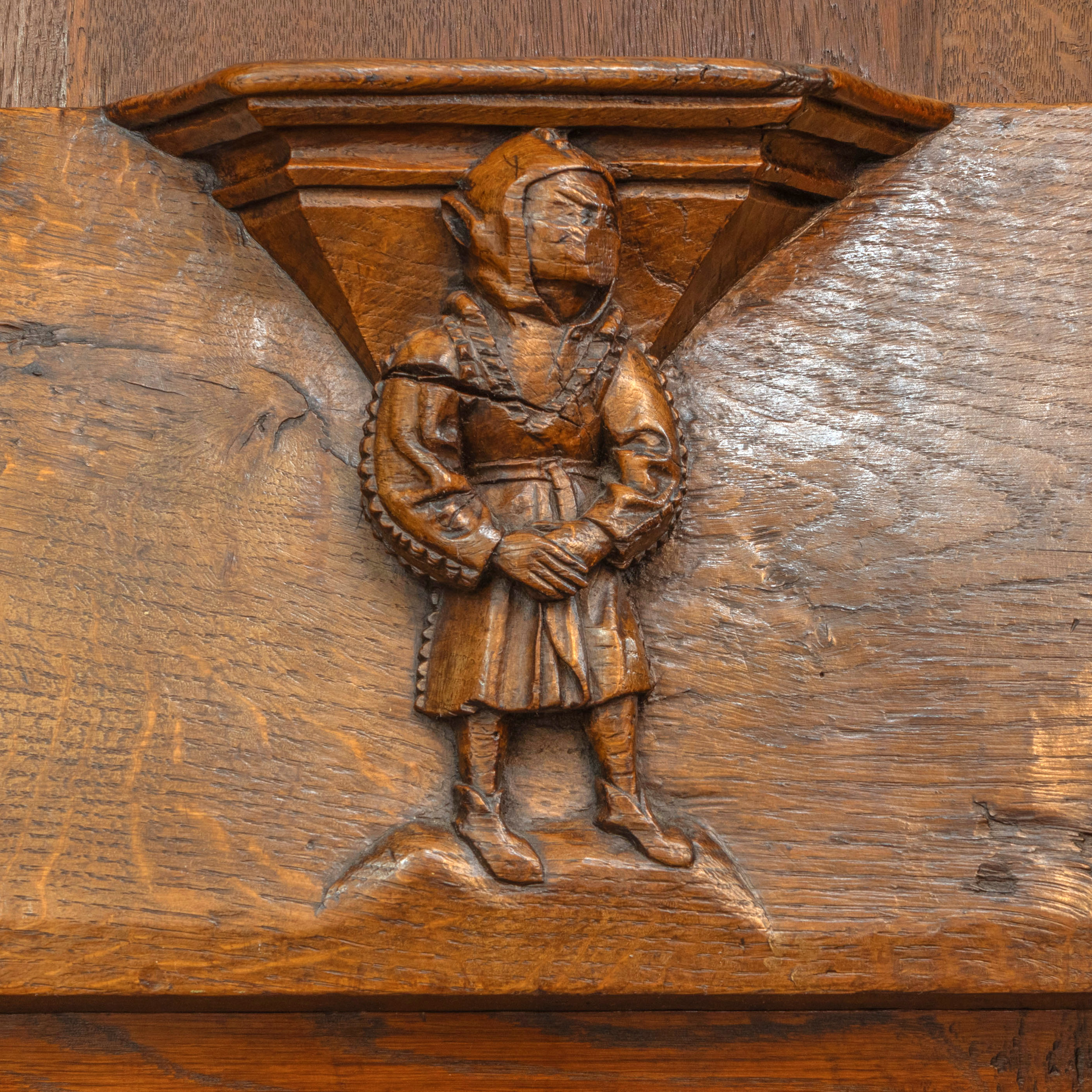
Detail of a misericord from the Great Church of Breda, carved in the 15th century, and defaced during the Great Iconoclasm.

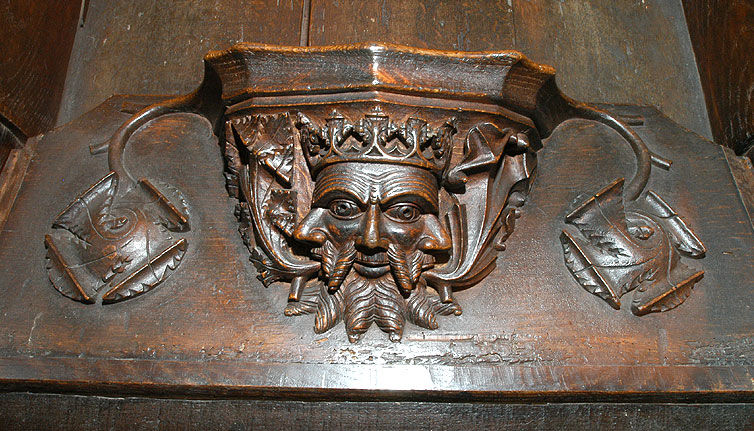
A triple-faced Green Man, Cartmel Priory, Cumbria

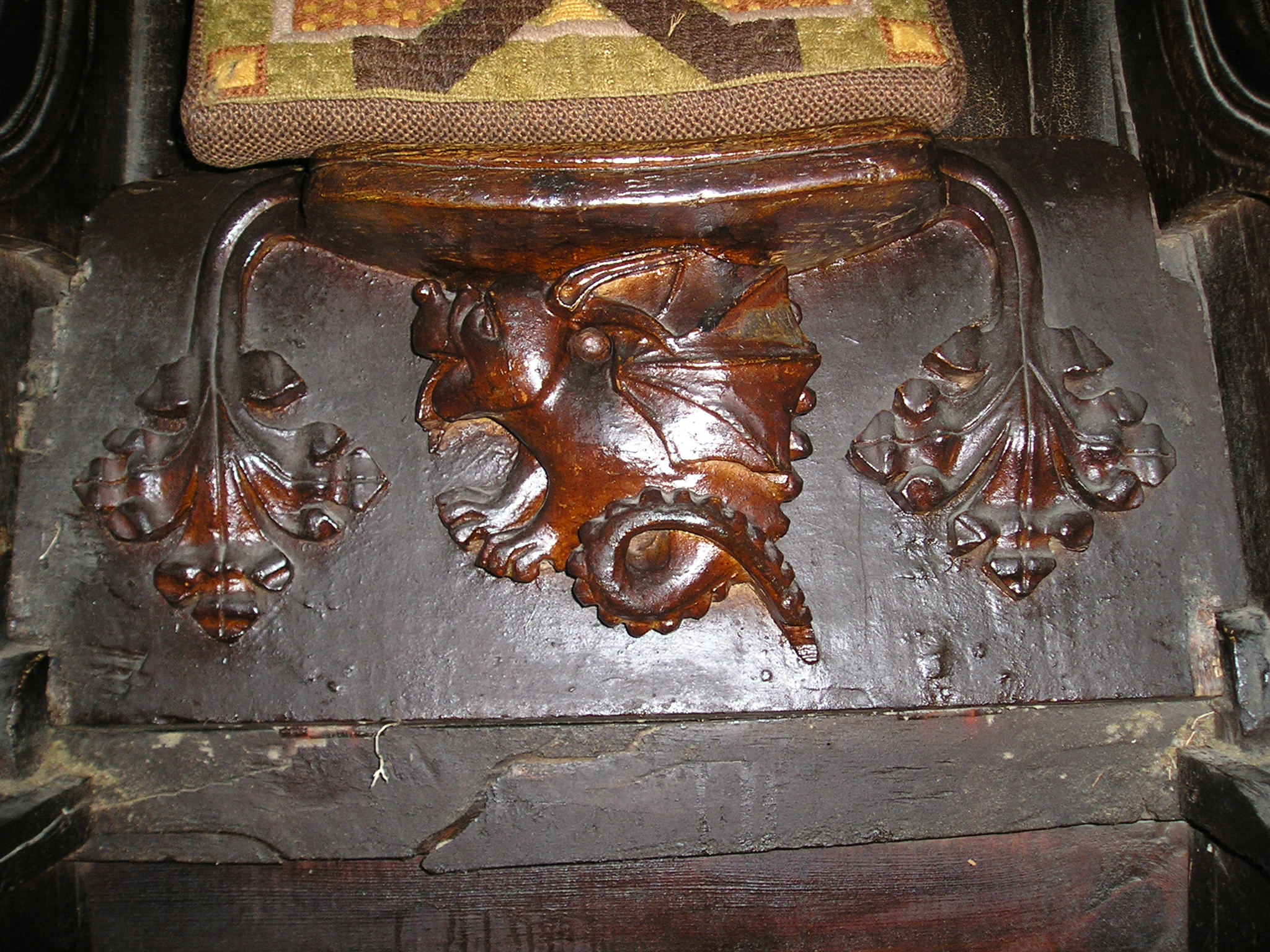
A wyvern, at Great Malvern Priory, Worcestershire

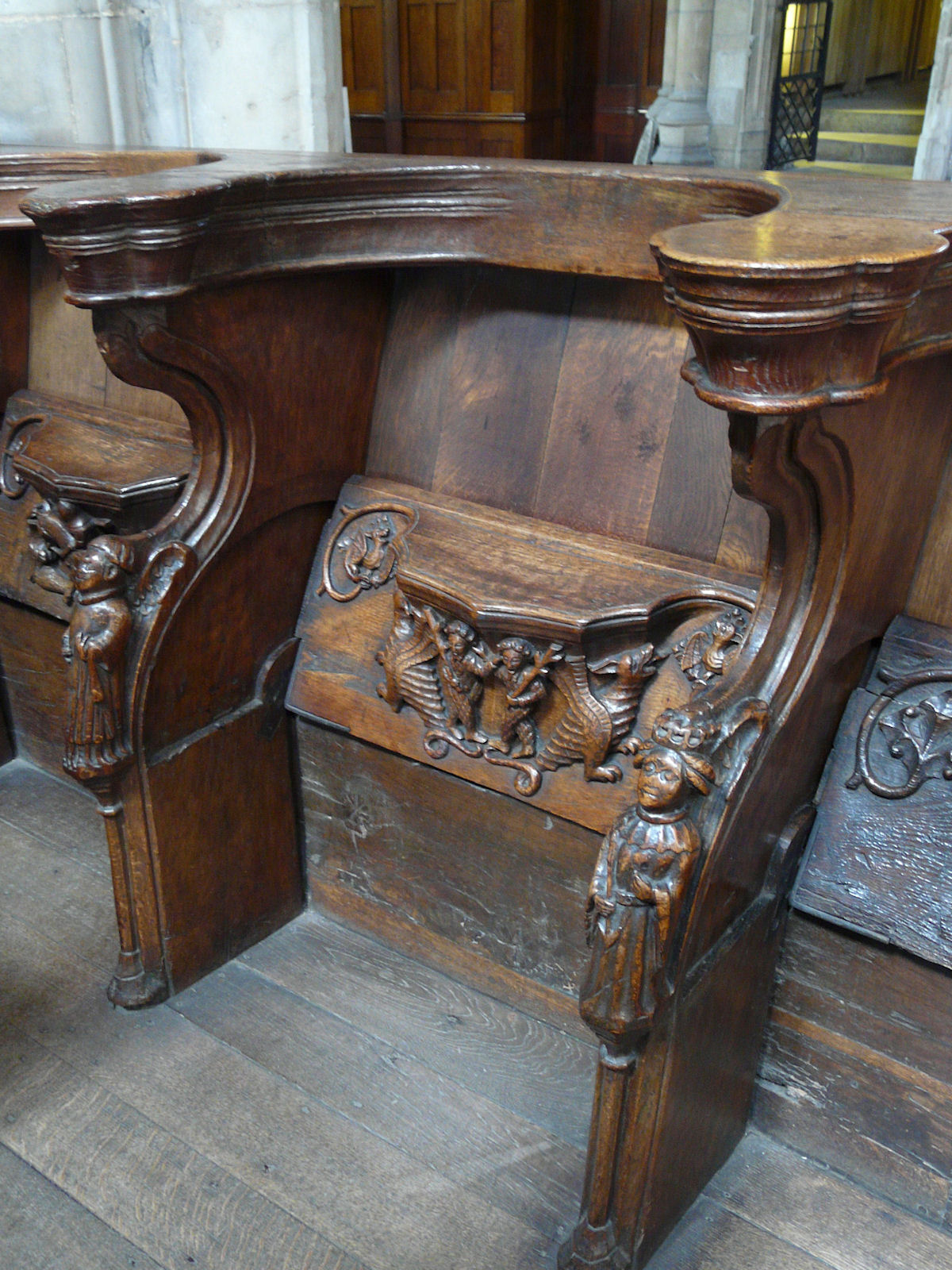
Beverley Minster, East Yorkshire: Wild men and wyverns

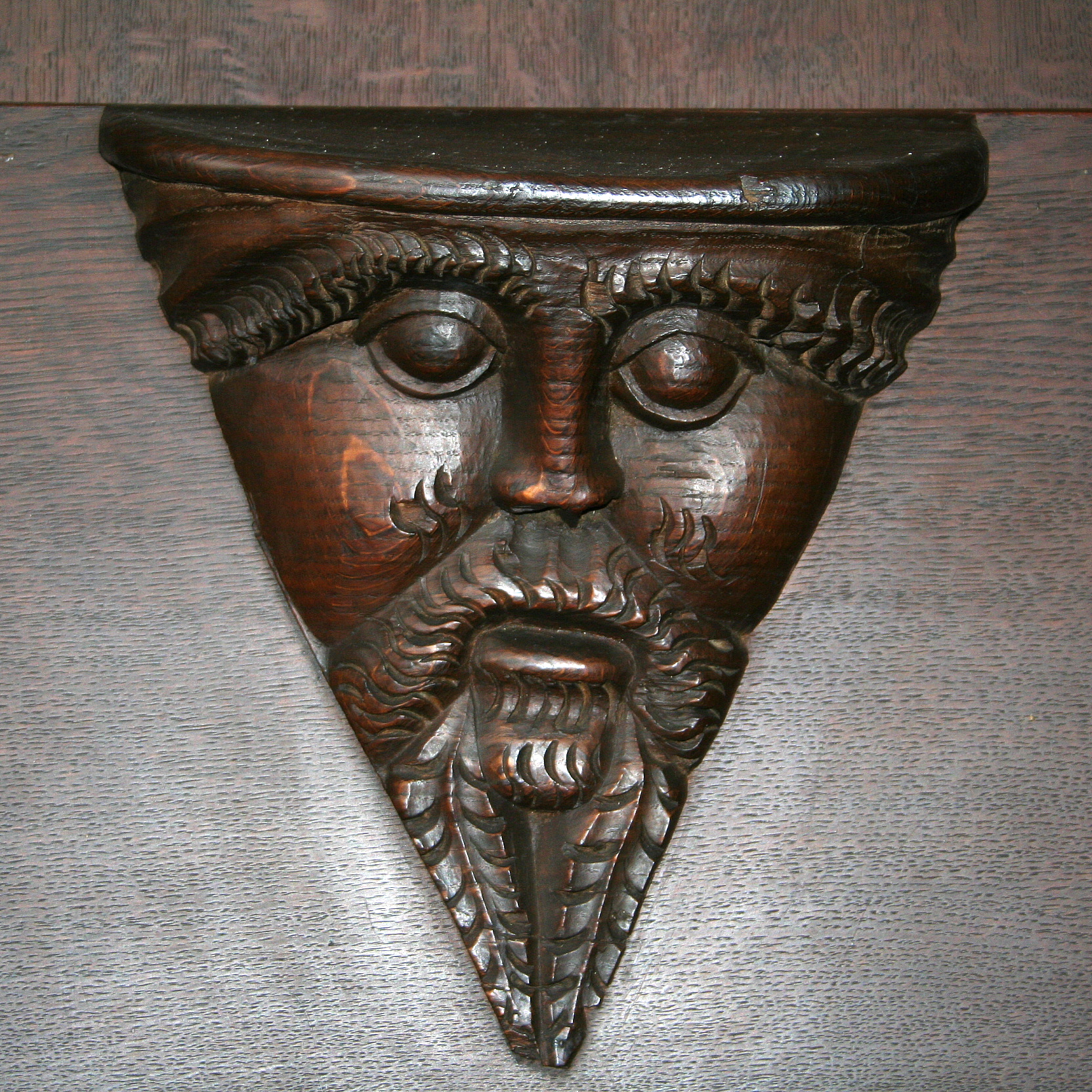
13th-century misericord, St Hadelin Abbey church, Hastière-par-delà, Belgium: a feudal lord

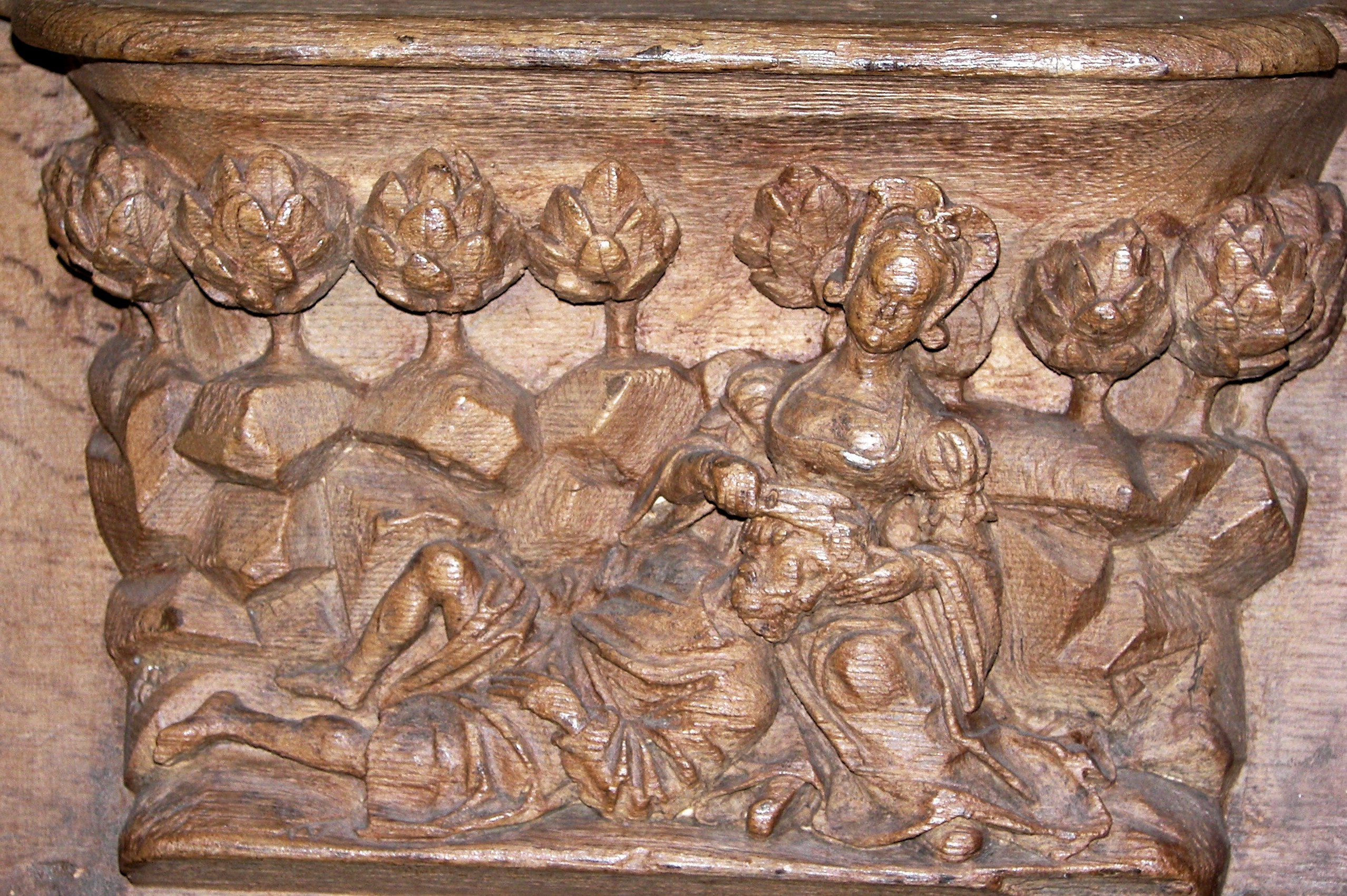
St Marcel, Villabé, France: Samson and Delilah

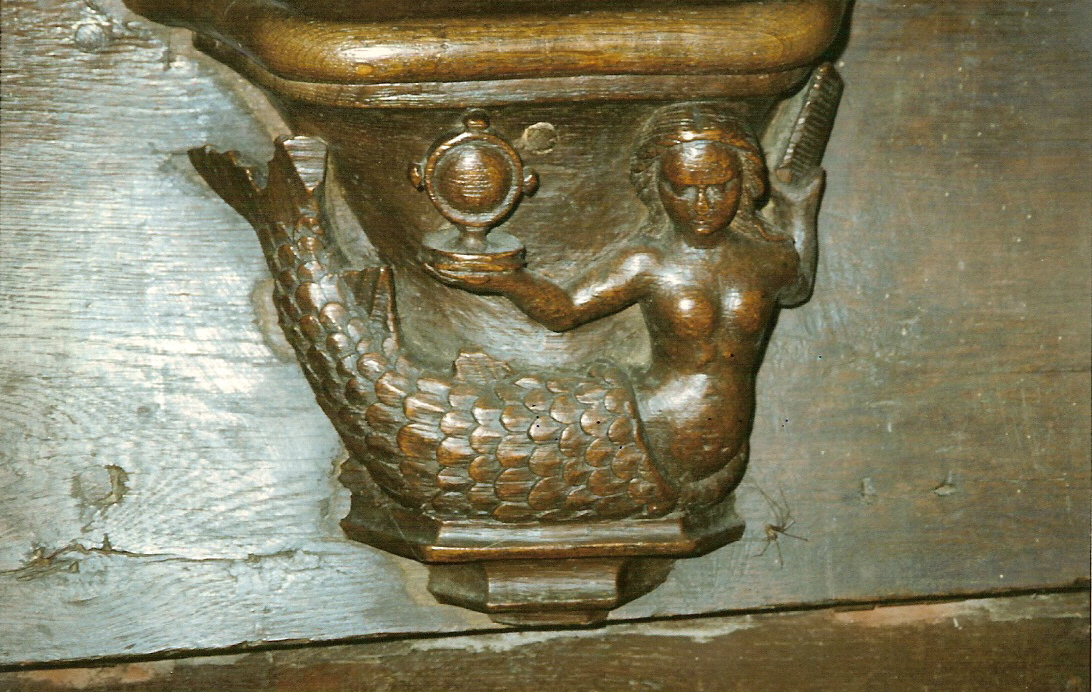
Les Andelys, Eure, France: mermaid, symbol of vanity

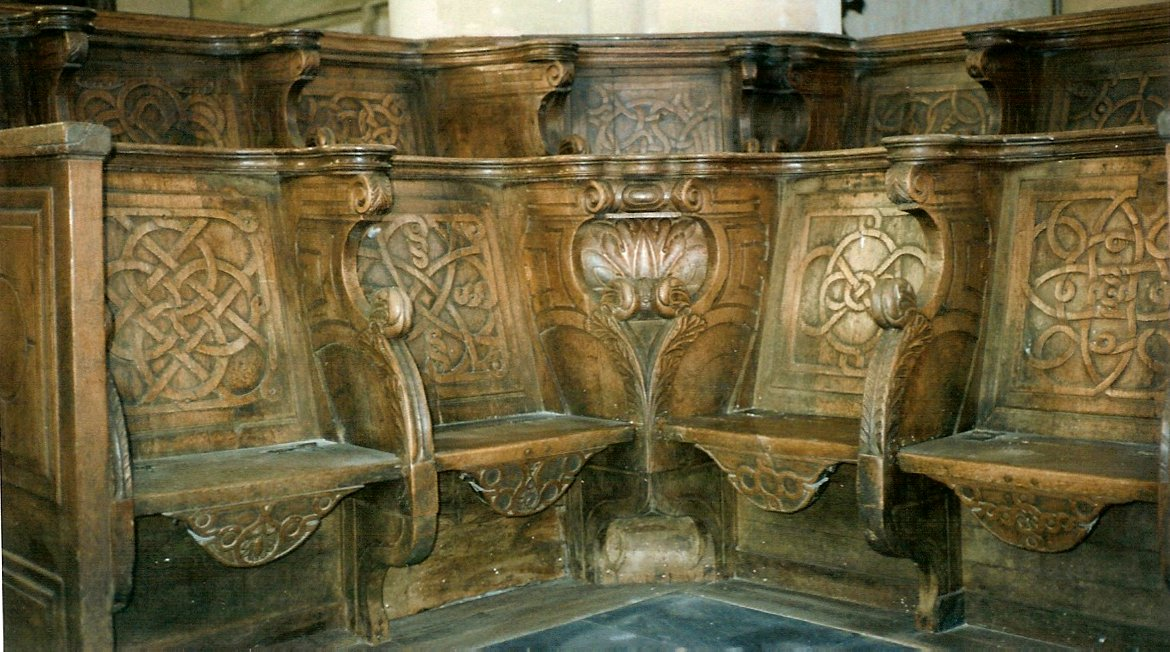
Choir stalls in the church of St. Pierre, Coutances, France, with the seats down

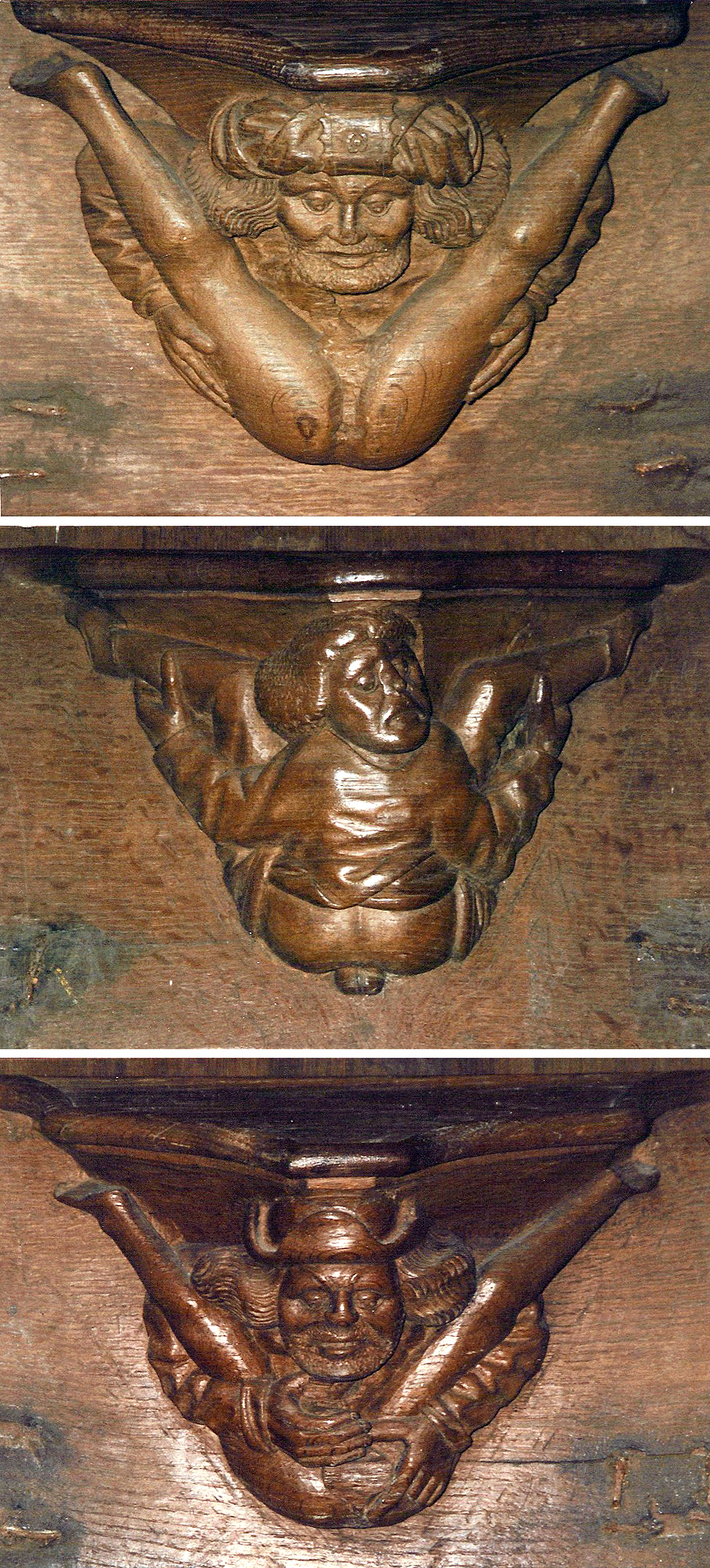
Exhibitionist subjects from Tréguier cathedral, Brittany, France

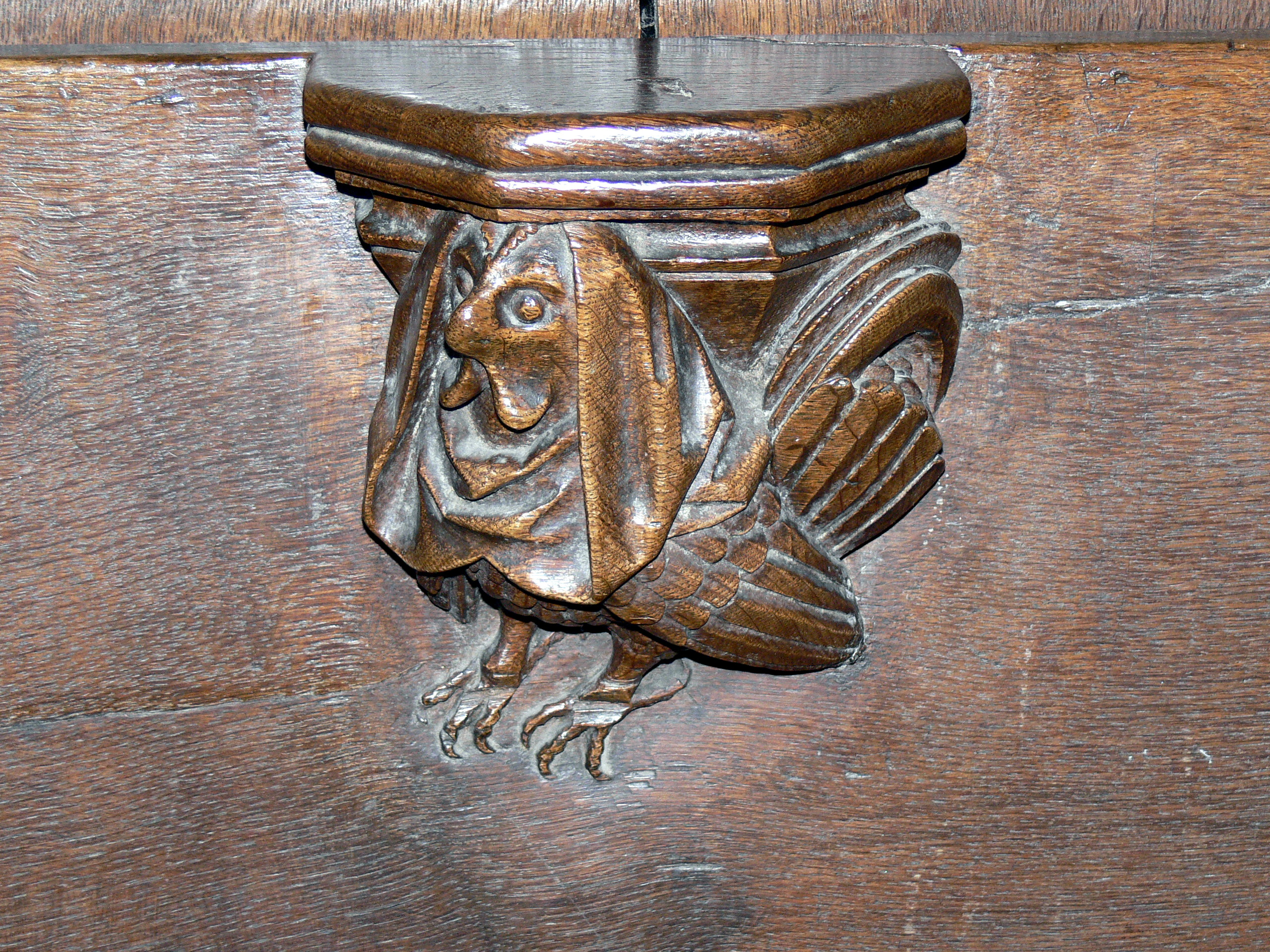
Ulm minster, Germany: a harpy

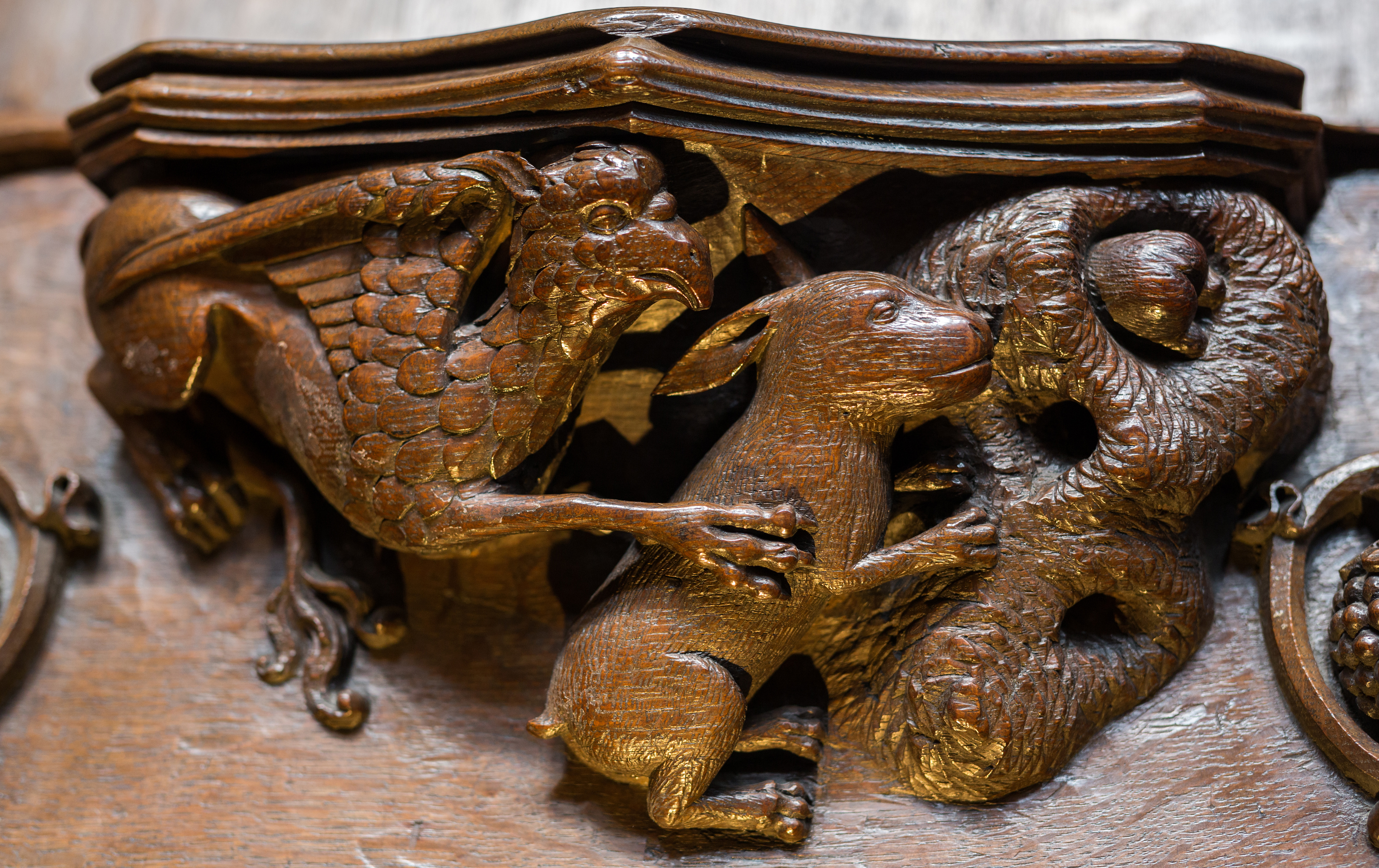
A misericord in Ripon Cathedral, allegedly the inspiration for the griffin and rabbit hole in Lewis Carroll's Alice in Wonderland

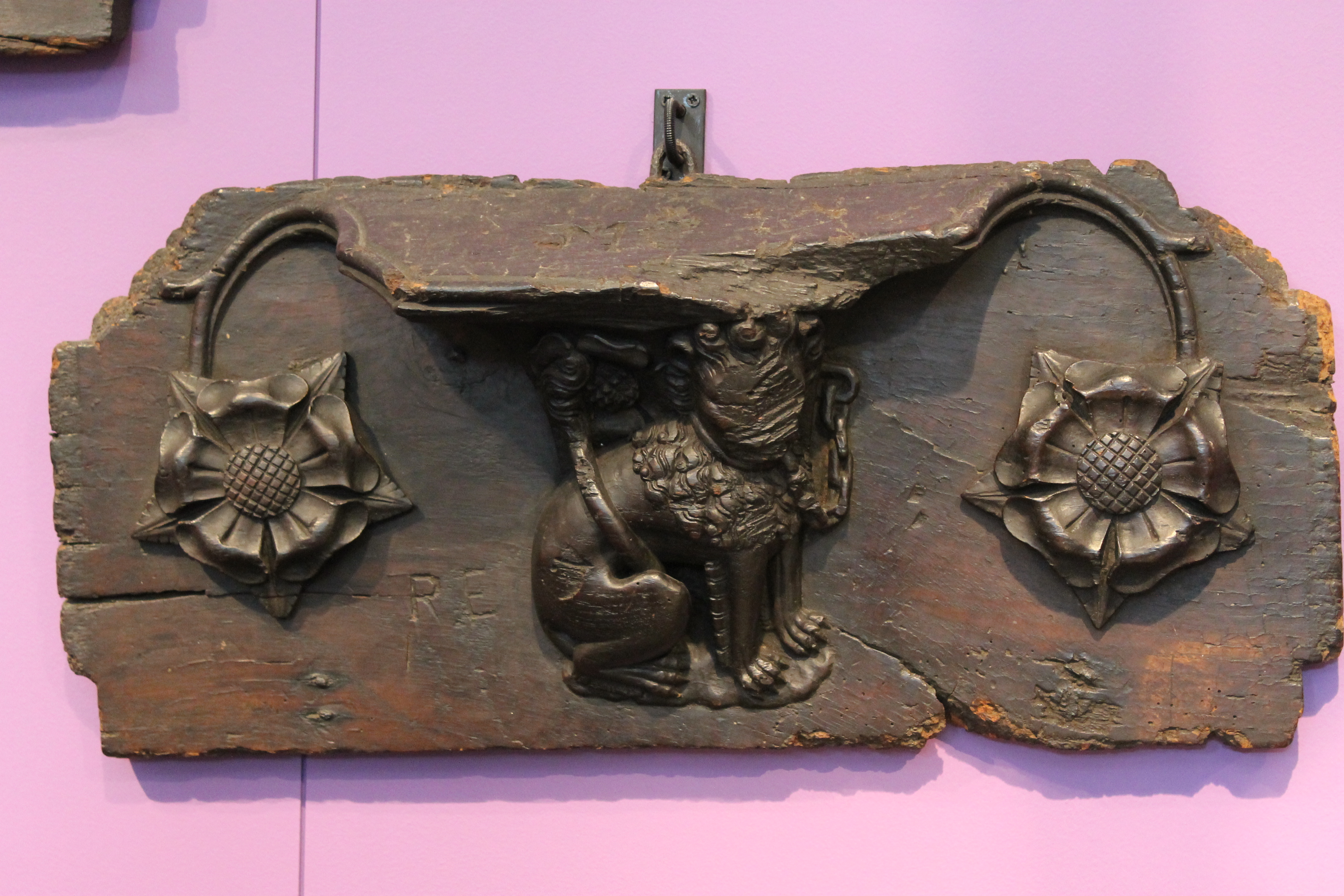
A misericord from Whitefriars in Coventry featuring the Tudor Rose, on display at Herbert Art Gallery and Museum

== See also ==
- Mourner's bench
- Prie-dieu
