= St Mary the Virgin, Hemingbrough =

Church in North Yorkshire, England

Coordinates: 53.7676°N 0.9797°W

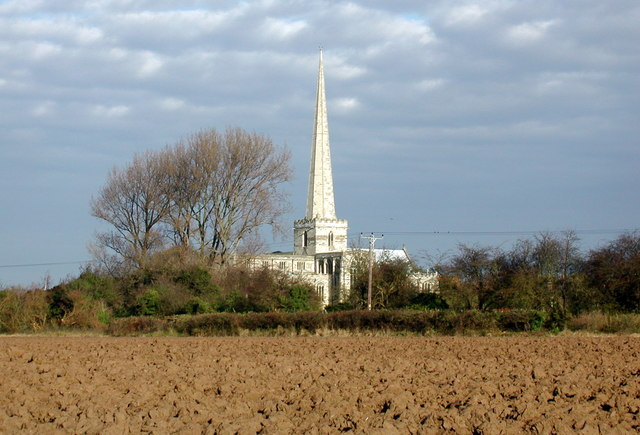
View from the southwest

St Mary the Virgin, Hemingbrough, also known as Hemingbrough Minster, is a church in Hemingbrough, which is near Selby in North Yorkshire, England. It is a Grade I listed building.

== History ==
The building originates from the late 12th century AD, additions were made in the 13th, 14th, and 15th centuries. William the Conqueror gave the church to the prior and convent of Durham. On 26 October 1426 Henry VI gave licence to convert it into a collegiate church with residentiary canons whose period of residence was thirteen weeks each. From 1479 this also applied to the provost who until then was compelled to be resident for the greater part of the year. There were also three prebendaries, six vicars, and six clerks. The college was suppressed in 1545.

The church is home to one of the UK's oldest surviving Misericords (a type of carved wooden seat) dating to the first part of the 13th century.

== Architecture ==
The church is of a cruciform layout and is built in the Decorated and later English style, although the windows in the north transept and the nave are Perpendicular. The tower is square and carries battlements and an octangular spire. The tower was added in the 13th century, and the spire, which reaches a height of 191 feet (58 m), was between 1416 and 1446. The nave is aisled and has four bays, as has the south aisle of the chancel. The chapter house has three bays. The vestry lies to the north. North and south transepts have two bays each.

== See also ==
- Grade I listed buildings in North Yorkshire (district)
- Listed buildings in Hemingbrough
