= Temple Hirst Preceptory =

Former priory in North Yorkshire, England

Coordinates: 53.719267°N 1.097202°W

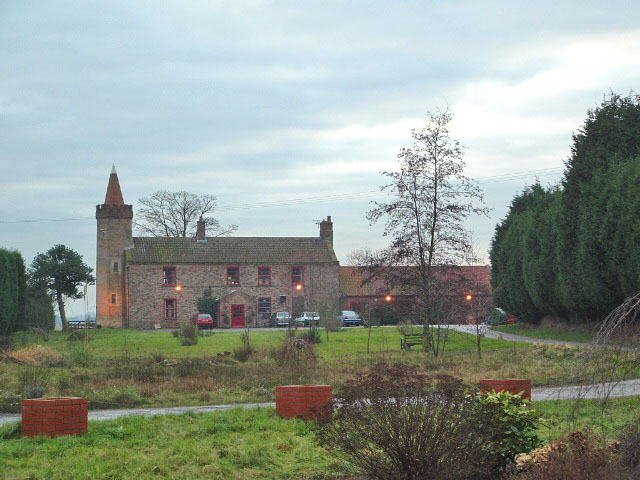
Temple Manor, incorporating remains of the preceptory

Temple Hirst Preceptory was a priory in North Yorkshire, England.

== History and overview ==
The Knights Templar established a preceptory at Temple Hirst. Other Yorkshire preceptories included Temple Newsam, Cowton, Westerdale, Ribston Hall, Faxfleet, Foulbridge, Wetherby and Weedley.

Ralph and William Hastings gave Temple Hirst to the Templars in 1152, and the grant was confirmed, probably in 1155 by Henry de Lacy. There appears to have been a preceptory established by 1160, when Robert Pirou was described as preceptor of Temple Hirst.

The preceptory became the administrative centre for a significant estate, as the Templars at Hirst received land grants in Norton (1160–70), Eggborough (c. 1161–77 and c. 1175–7) and the Templars’ Inquest of 1185 records lands in Kellington, Fenwick, Norton, Fairburn, Burghwallis, the church of Kellington and two mills at Hirst. During the thirteenth century, the preceptory acquired properties in Hirst Courtney, East, Chapel and West Haddlesey, Osgodby, Thorne and Fishlake, and by 1308 also held lands in Hensall, Smeaton and Burn.

An inventory of the goods at Temple Hirst in 1308 lists a hall or treasury, chapel, kitchen and larder, brewhouse, bakehouse, and dovecot, while another made in 1312 adds a dormitory, dairy, granary and forge. The chapel had an altar to the Blessed Virgin Mary. There was also a grange just across the river at Potterlawe in Eggborough, later known as Sherwood Hall. Sherwood Hall was demolished in the 1960s to construct Eggborough Power Station.

At the trial of the Templars, the archbishop’s official claimed that Sir Miles Stapleton and Sir Adam Everingham had told him that they were once invited with other knights to a banquet at Temple Hirst where they were told that many of the brethren were accustomed to worship a calf.

=== Later history ===
The estate remained with the Darcy family until Thomas, lord Darcy, was executed in 1537 for his role in the Pilgrimage of Grace.

==== Templestowe ====
The remains of the preceptory may have provided the inspiration for the preceptory called Templestowe in Sir Walter Scott’s novel, Ivanhoe. The bell of the church of St Michael described in the novel has been identified as belonging to the Templar’s church at Kellington. Scott’s friend, Mr Morritt of Rokeby, owned Sherwood Hall, the former grange of Potterlawe held by the preceptory at Temple Hirst.

== Temple Manor ==
The remains of the preceptory were incorporated into a manor house in the 15th or 16th century. In the 17th century, the manor house was demolished other than its tower, which was incorporated into a new house, known as "Temple Manor". The house was grade II listed in 1966, and was renovated and altered in 1980 as part of conversion into a public house. The building was later converted into a nursing home.

The tower is built of reddish-orange brick on a plinth, it is octagonal and has three storeys. It contains a doorway and chamfered windows, and at the top is an embattled parapet and a tiled conical roof. The house is built of pinkish-brown brick with dressings in magnesian limestone, a plinth, and a pantile roof. It has two storeys and four bays. On the front is a two-storey gabled porch with quoins, a dentilled band, and dentilled parapets on the sides. The inserted Norman doorway, from the preceptory, has a moulded arch and a hood mould. Most of the windows are sashes, and there is a French window. Inside the tower is a partially-collapsed oak spiral staircase.

== See also ==
- Listed buildings in Temple Hirst

== External sources ==
- John S. Lee, ‘Landowners and landscapes: the Knights Templar and their successors at Temple Hirst, Yorkshire’, The Local Historian, 41 (2011), 293–307.
- The Corpus of Romanesque Sculpture in Britain & Ireland, Temple Hirst, Yorkshire, West Riding
