= Selby District Council elections =

Local government elections in North Yorkshire, England

Selby District Council was the local authority for the district of Selby in North Yorkshire, England, from 1974 to 2023. It was elected every four years.

== Political control ==
The first election to the council was held in 1973, initially operating as a shadow authority alongside the outgoing authorities until it came into its powers on 1 April 1974. Political control from 1974 until its abolition in 2023 was as follows:

Party in control	Years
No overall control	1974–1979
Conservative	1979–1991
No overall control	1991–1995
Labour	1995–1999
No overall control	1999–2003
Conservative	2003–2023

=== Leadership ===
The leaders of the council from 2003 until the council's abolition were:

Councillor	Party	From	To
Arthur Cawood	Conservative		May 1995
Geoff Lynch	Labour	May 1995	November 2000†
Dean Howson	Labour	November 2000	May 2003
Mark Crane	Conservative	May 2003	Mar 2023

== Council elections ==
- 1973 Selby District Council election
- 1976 Selby District Council election
- 1979 Selby District Council election (New ward boundaries)
- 1983 Selby District Council election
- 1987 Selby District Council election (District boundary changes took place but the number of seats remained the same)
- 1991 Selby District Council election (District boundary changes took place but the number of seats remained the same)
- 1995 Selby District Council election (District boundary changes took place but the number of seats remained the same)
- 1999 Selby District Council election
- 2003 Selby District Council election (New ward boundaries)
- 2007 Selby District Council election
- 2011 Selby District Council election
- 2015 Selby District Council election (New ward boundaries)
- 2019 Selby District Council election

== Council composition ==
Year	Conservative	Labour	Liberal Democrats	Yorkshire	Independent	Council control after election
1995	9	26	1	0	5	Labour
1999	15	20	1	0	5	No overall control
2003	23	14	1	0	3	Conservative
2007	29	9	0	0	3	Conservative
2011	29	10	0	0	2	Conservative
2015	22	8	0	0	1	Conservative
2019	16	8	0	4	3	Conservative

== Results maps ==
2003 results map

2007 results map

2011 results map

2015 results map

2019 results map

== By-election results ==
=== 1995-1999 ===
Cawood with Wistow By-Election 30 January 1997 replacing Archie Paton (resigned)
Party	Candidate	Votes	%	±%
Labour	Kevin Aston	408	48.2	
Conservative	John Cattanach	395	46.7	
Liberal Democrats	John Eastwood	43	5.1	
Majority		13	1.5	
Turnout		846	44.0	
Labour hold		Swing		

Camblesforth By-Election 17 July 1997
Party	Candidate	Votes	%	±%
Labour	John Bedworth	317	59.7	−0.7
Conservative	Ann Spetch	180	33.9	−6.0
Liberal Democrats	John Eastwood	34	6.4	+6.4
Majority		137	25.8	
Turnout		531	31.8	
Labour hold		Swing		

Tadcaster West By-Election 30 April 1998 replacing William Parnaby (deceased)
Party	Candidate	Votes	%	±%
Labour	David Wilson	205	30.0	+7.7
Independent	Richard Sweeting	204	29.9	+0.3
Conservative	Terry Welsh	172	25.2	+9.8
Liberal Democrats	Roderic Parker	102	14.9	−17.3
Majority		1	0.1	
Turnout		683		
Labour gain from Independent		Swing		

Hambleton By-Election 7 January 1999
Party	Candidate	Votes	%	±%
Conservative	Chris Pearson	278	52.3	+18.1
Labour	J. Sutcliffe	254	47.7	+5.2
Majority		24	4.6	
Turnout		532	29.5	
Conservative gain from Labour		Swing		

=== 1999-2003 ===
Fairburn & Brotherton By-Election 25 January 2001 replacing Geoff Lynch (deceased)
Party	Candidate	Votes	%	±%
Labour	Roy Wilson	239	80.2	+2.9
Conservative	Keith Bradley	59	19.8	−2.9
Majority		180	60.4	
Turnout		298	26.4	
Labour hold		Swing		

Carlton By-Election 15 November 2001
Party	Candidate	Votes	%	±%
Labour	Rod Price	282	46.6	−6.6
Conservative	Margaret Hulme	211	34.9	−11.9
Independent	Maria Morris	112	18.5	+18.5
Majority		71	11.7	
Turnout		605	34.9	
Labour hold		Swing		

=== 2003-2007 ===
North Duffield By-Election 14 September 2006 replacing Maurice Patrick (deceased)
Party	Candidate	Votes	%	±%
Conservative	William Inness	316	79.0	
Labour	Jean Bills	84	21.0	
Majority		232	58.0	
Turnout		400	28.4	
Conservative gain from Independent		Swing		

=== 2015-2019 ===
Byram and Brotherton By-Election 14 July 2016 replacing Jack Crawford (deceased)
Party	Candidate	Votes	%	±%
Conservative	Bryn Sage	251	44.3	+11.7
Labour	Steven Shaw-Wright	224	39.6	−4.4
Yorkshire First	Chris Whitwood	91	16.1	+16.1
Majority		27	4.8	
Turnout		566		
Conservative gain from Labour		Swing		

=== 2019-2023 ===
Camblesforth and Carlton By-Election 6 May 2021 replacing Paul Welburn (resigned)
Party	Candidate	Votes	%	±%
Conservative	Charles Richardson	996	66.4	+42.2
Labour	David Bowgett	342	22.8	−0.1
Green	Barry Jones	162	10.8	+10.8
Majority		654	43.6	
Turnout		1,500		
Conservative gain from Yorkshire		Swing		

Byram and Brotherton By-Election 20 January 2022 replacing Eleanor Jordan (resigned)
Party	Candidate	Votes	%	±%
Conservative	Georgina Ashton	215	48.1	+13.4
Labour	Matthew Burton	207	46.3	+26.2
Green	Cherry Waters	25	5.6	+5.6
Majority		8	1.8	
Turnout		447		
Conservative hold		Swing	▼6.4	
