= Chapel Haddlesey =

Village and civil parish in North Yorkshire, England

Coordinates: 53°43′43″N 1°07′12″W

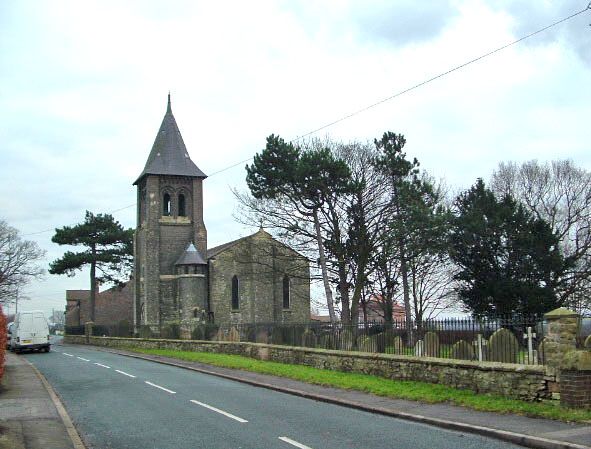
- St John the Baptist's parish church, Hirst Road, Chapel Haddlesey, seen from the northwest

- Location within North Yorkshire
- Population: 202 (2011)
- OS grid reference: SE581452
- Unitary authority: North Yorkshire
- Ceremonial county: North Yorkshire
- Region: Yorkshire and the Humber
- Country: England
- Sovereign state: United Kingdom
- Post town: Selby
- Postcode district: YO8
- Police: North Yorkshire
- Fire: North Yorkshire
- Ambulance: Yorkshire

Chapel Haddlesey is a village and civil parish in the county of North Yorkshire, England. The village is just east off the A19 road, which crosses the River Aire on Haddlesey Bridge.

The village used to be in the Barkston Ash Wapentake and up until 1974, it was in the West Riding of Yorkshire. From 1974 to 2023 it was part of the Selby District, it is now administered by the unitary North Yorkshire Council.

== Overview ==
At the west end of the village is the Church of England primary school, which has an age range of 4–11, and an average of 50 pupils on the roster. St John the Baptist's Church, Haddlesey is at the east end of the village. The church was built in 1836 on the site of a previous religious house that dated back to the 14th century. Originally the church was a chapel of ease, as it was part of the parish of Birkin. It formed its own parish, along with the nearby villages of Temple Hirst and Hirst Courtney in 1873.

Boats used to travel up the River Aire to the south of the village and a weir and lock (Haddlesey Old Lock) were constructed in 1702. The lock became redundant upon the opening of the Selby Canal in 1778, but the weir was kept in place to allow headwaters to build up and keep the mouth from the canal at Selby in deep water. The canal mouth is at West Haddlesey, which is just 0.62 miles (1 km) to the west of Chapel Haddlesey.

In 2016, Haddlesey Old Lock was converted into a hydro power station to generate enough electricity for 440 homes. The bottom of the lock is also the normal tidal limit for the River Aire.

== See also ==
- Listed buildings in Chapel Haddlesey
