= Listed buildings in Gateforth =

Gateforth is a civil parish in the county of North Yorkshire, England. It contains ten listed buildings that are recorded in the National Heritage List for England. Of these, one is listed at Grade II*, the middle of the three grades, and the others are at Grade II, the lowest grade. The parish contains the village of Gateforth and the surrounding countryside. The most important building in the parish is Gateforth Hall, which is listed, and most of the other listed buildings are associated with it or in its grounds. The Selby Canal runs through the parish, and the listed buildings on it are two bridges and two culvert tunnels.

== Key ==
Grade	Criteria
II*	Particularly important buildings of more than special interest
II	Buildings of national importance and special interest

== Buildings ==
Name and location	Photograph	Date	Notes	Grade
Burton Bridge; 53.75397°N 1.11403°W		1775–78	An accommodation bridge crossing the Selby Canal, it is in sandstone, and consists of a single hump-backed semicircular arch. The bridge has voussoirs, chamfered plinths, a projecting string course, and a low slightly cambered solid parapet in millstone grit, curving and ending in round capped piers. On the northwest corner is an iron rope roller.	II
Paper House Bridge; 53.74116°N 1.13248°W		Late 18th century	The bridge carries a track over the Selby Canal, it is in millstone grit, and consists of a humpbacked bridge with one round arch. The bridge has a low parapet with splayed ends, ending in round-capped piers.	II
Lund Tunnel; 53.74694°N 1.12797°W		1778	A culvert tunnel designed by William Jessop and constructed by the Aire and Calder Navigation Company to reduce the risk of flooding. It is in limestone and gritstone, and consists of a sump on each side of the canal, linked by a culvert tunnel passing under the canal, and is built on timber foundations.	II
Paper House Tunnel; 53.74128°N 1.13246°W		1778	The canal culvert on the Selby Canal was built by the Aire and Calder Navigation Company. The walls and culvert are in gritstone and limestone on timber foundations. They consist of a pair of semicircular sumps linked by walls linked by four culvert channels. The channel walls play out at the northern end to form a wine-glass plan.	II
Gateforth Hall; 53.75951°N 1.15807°W		1814	A country house, later a hotel, in gault brick, with dressings in magnesian limestone, the basement in red brick, with a cornice, a low parapet, and a hipped grey slate roof. There are two storeys and a basement, a main block with a square plan and three bays, and an entrance hall and a service wing to the right. In the centre is a full-height bow approached by curved steps, with a portico of four giant Ionic columns, a frieze, a cornice and a low parapet. In the centre, steps lead to a doorway with fluted jambs and a rectangular fanlight. The windows on the front are sashes, those in the ground floor with aprons. The service wing has two storeys, seven bays, and modillion eaves brackets.	II*
Church Lodge, gates and piers 53.76096°N 1.15656°W		c. 1814	The lodge at the entrance to the grounds of Gateforth Hall is in gault brick with stone dressings, embattled parapets, and a hipped grey slate roof. There is a single storey, a single bay flanked by single bay wings projecting at angles, and a rear range. Steps lead up to a trellised porch with canted sides, and a recessed doorway with an arched lintel. The windows are sashes. At the entrance are decorative wrought iron gates and stone gate piers.	II
The Coach House and Hall Cottages; 53.76036°N 1.15755°W		c. 1814	The coach house, stables and dovecote of Gateforth Hall have been converted into three houses. In the centre is a bay with one storey and an attic, flanked by two single-story bays, and projecting wings with two storeys and three bays. There are floor bands and bracketed eaves throughout, and hipped roofs. The main range has a central round arch, above which is a radial window, and in the outer bays are segmental-arched carriage entrances. The left wing has been converted into two cottages, rendered and whitewashed. The right wing contains two wide carriage arches with segmental heads, and 20th-century windows.	II
West Lodge; 53.75584°N 1.16316°W		c. 1814	The lodge at the west entrance to the grounds of Gateforth Hall is in gault brick, with stone dressings, moulded eaves, a cornice, a low parapet, and a hipped slate roof. There is a single storey and three bays, the middle bay projecting under a pediment. Steps lead up to a central doorway with a rectangular fanlight, and a flat hood on moulded consoles. The windows are sashes with cambered gauged brick arches.	II
Ha-ha, Gateforth Hall; 53.75938°N 1.15744°W		Early 19th century	The ha-ha to the southeast of the house is in red brick with stone coping. It has a curved plan, and is about 1.75 metres (5 ft 9 in) high.	II
Gates and piers, The Coach House; 53.76078°N 1.15683°W		19th century	The gates are in wrought iron, and have standards and decorative scrollwork. The gate piers are in stone, and have a square plan.	II
