= Huddleston with Newthorpe =

Civil parish in North Yorkshire, England

Coordinates: 53.7909°N 1.2932°W

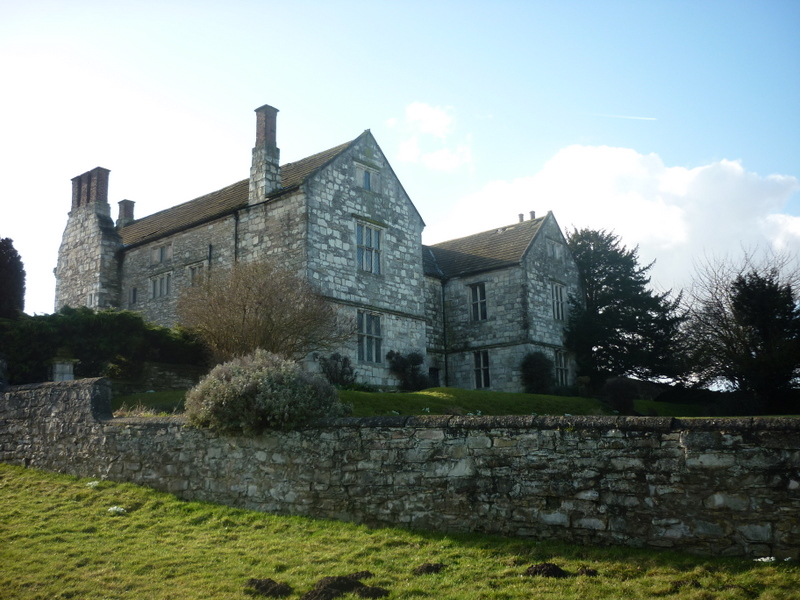
- Huddleston Hall

- Location within North Yorkshire
- Population: 88 (2021 census)
- Civil parish: Huddleston with Newthorpe
- Unitary authority: North Yorkshire
- Ceremonial county: North Yorkshire
- Region: Yorkshire and the Humber
- Country: England
- Sovereign state: United Kingdom
- Police: North Yorkshire
- Fire: North Yorkshire
- Ambulance: Yorkshire

Huddleston with Newthorpe is a civil parish in North Yorkshire, in England.

The parish includes the hamlet of Newthorpe alongside the B1222 road, a short section of the A1(M) motorway and Great North Road, and an area of countryside in which Huddleston Hall lies.

Huddleston is a rural locality to the north of the railway line from Micklefield to Church Fenton. Another line from Micklefield, which is across the county boundary in West Yorkshire, also passes through the parish, just south of Newthorpe, on its way to Selby.

The parish was created on 1 April 1937, when the parish of Newthorpe was merged with the parish of Huddleston cum Lumby. In 2015, the parish had an estimated population of 140 people.

Until 1974 it was part of the West Riding of Yorkshire. From 1974 to 2023 it was part of the Selby District, it is now administered by the unitary North Yorkshire Council.

== See also ==
- Listed buildings in Huddleston with Newthorpe
