= Hirst Courtney =

Village and civil parish in North Yorkshire, England

Coordinates: 53.713°N 1.073°W

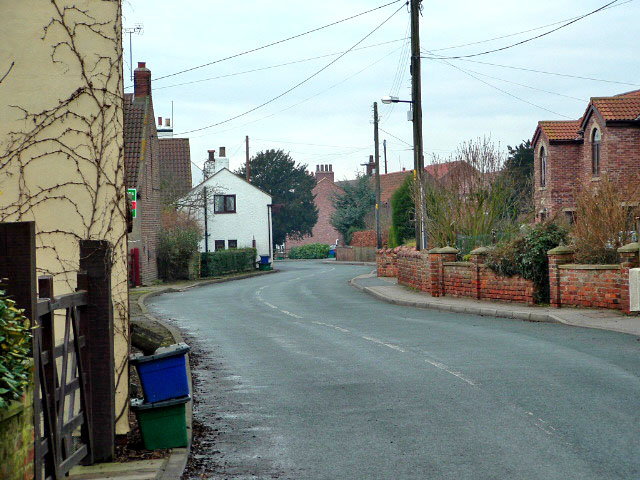

- Location within North Yorkshire
- Population: 287 (2011)
- Civil parish: Hirst Courtney
- Unitary authority: North Yorkshire
- Ceremonial county: North Yorkshire
- Region: Yorkshire and the Humber
- Country: England
- Sovereign state: United Kingdom
- Post town: Selby
- Postcode district: YO8
- Police: North Yorkshire
- Fire: North Yorkshire
- Ambulance: Yorkshire

Hirst Courtney is a village and civil parish in the county of North Yorkshire, England.

The name derives from Old English Hyrst (wooded hill) and possession by the Courtney family in the thirteenth century. In 1825 the population was 144, in 23 households. In 2011 the population was 287.

The village was historically part of the West Riding of Yorkshire until 1974. From 1974 to 2023 it was part of the Selby District, it is now administered by the unitary North Yorkshire Council.

The village formally had a public house called the Royal Oak Inn. It closed in 2015. In November 2022, an application to demolish the pub and replaced it with housing was approved after previously being rejected by Selby District Council in April.

Until 2014, Hirst Courtney shared a community primary school with neighbouring village Temple Hirst. In 2012 the school received a requires improvement rating from Ofsted. In November 2013, the school had less than 14 pupils enrolled, a decrease from the previous inspection when there was 26. The school closed on 22 April 2014, and the remaining pupils were transferred to Chapel Haddlesey CE VC School.

In February 2020, parts of the village were evacuated during flooding from the River Aire.
