= Newthorpe =

Newthorpe may refer to:

- Newthorpe, Nottinghamshire
- Newthorpe, North Yorkshire
