= Listed buildings in Temple Hirst =

Temple Hirst is a civil parish in the county of North Yorkshire, England. It contains two listed buildings that are recorded in the National Heritage List for England. Both the listed buildings are designated at Grade II, the lowest of the three grades, which is applied to "buildings of national importance and special interest". The parish contains the village of Temple Hirst and the surrounding countryside, and the listed buildings consist of a house and a farmhouse.

== Buildings ==
Name and location	Photograph	Date	Notes
Temple Manor; 53.71916°N 1.09676°W		17th century	The house incorporates earlier material, including a late 12th-century doorway from Temple Hirst Preceptory, and a tower from a fortified manor house, dating from about 1500. The tower is in reddish-orange brick on a plinth, it is octagonal and has three storeys. It contains a doorway and chamfered windows, and at the top is an embattled parapet and a tiled conical roof. The house is in pinkish-brown brick with dressings in magnesian limestone, a plinth, and a pantile roof. There are two storeys and four bays. On the front is a two-storey gabled porch with quoins, a dentilled band, and dentilled parapets on the sides. The inserted Norman doorway has a moulded arch and a hood mould. Most of the windows are sashes, and there is a French window.
Manor Farmhouse; 53.71815°N 1.08558°W	—	Late 17th to early 18th century	The farmhouse is in rendered reddish-brown brick, with stone dressings, quoins, a floor band, and a swept pantile roof with stone coping. There are two storeys and three bays, and extensions to the rear on the right. The central doorway has a doorway with a fanlight, and the windows are sashes, one tripartite.
