= Listed buildings in Chapel Haddlesey =

Chapel Haddlesey is a civil parish in the county of North Yorkshire, England. It contains four listed buildings that are recorded in the National Heritage List for England. All the listed buildings are designated at Grade II, the lowest of the three grades, which is applied to "buildings of national importance and special interest". The parish contains the village of Chapel Haddlesey and the surrounding countryside. The Selby Canal passes through the parish, and three listed buildings are associated with it, a bridge and two culvert tunnels, and the other listed building is a milestone.

== Buildings ==
Name and location	Photograph	Date	Notes
Paper House Bridge; 53.74116°N 1.13248°W		Late 18th century	The bridge carries a track over the Selby Canal, it is in millstone grit, and consists of a humpbacked bridge with one round arch. The bridge has a low parapet with splayed ends, ending in round-capped piers.
Paper House Tunnel; 53.74130°N 1.13254°W		1778	The canal culvert on the Selby Canal was built by the Aire and Calder Navigation Company. The walls and culvert are in gritstone and limestone on timber foundations. They consist of a pair of semicircular sumps linked by walls linked by four culvert channels. The channel walls play out at the northern end to form a wine-glass plan.
Tankard's Culvert; 53.73350°N 1.13461°W		1778	The canal culvert on the Selby Canal was built by the Aire and Calder Navigation Company. The walls and culvert are in gritstone and limestone on timber foundations. They consist of a pair of sumps with an inverted horseshoe plan, lined by walls linked by two culvert channels. The channel walls have depressed angled U-plans, with straight lengths of wall that are splayed out at either end.
Milestone; 53.73029°N 1.12220°W		1833–34	The milestone is on the northwest side of the A19 road, and is in magnesian limestone. It consists of a pillar with a rectangular section and a gabled head. On the front is a chamfered plinth, above which are inscribed the distances to Doncaster, Askern, Selby and York.
