= Selby and District DIAL =

- Formation: 1 July 1988
- Founder: Margaret Hewer
- Dissolved: 30 March 2018; 8 years ago
- Legal status: Charity
- Purpose: Help and advice for disabled people
- Location: 12 Park Street, Selby YO8 4PW, England
- Region served: Selby and district, North Yorkshire, England
- Services: Welfare rights advice, form filling, benefit checks, signposting, short-term wheelchair hire, activities group, support group, disability awareness
- Website: web.archive.org/web/20180811163712/http://selbyanddistrictdial.co.uk/ (now archived)

Selby and District DIAL was an independent, regional charity which offered help and advice to people with disabilities, caregivers, family and concerned professionals. Based in the town of Selby, its remit covered the Selby District of North Yorkshire in England, with a population of 83,449 at the 2011 Census.

Selby and District DIAL was founded on 1 July 1988 and opened after volunteer training around May 1989. Its registered charity number was 1058185.

Initially the charity was run entirely by volunteers. Later, with the aid of lottery, council and other funding, it was able to move into larger premises, take on more volunteers, employ paid staff, and expand its services.

Due to a lack of funding, DIAL had to close its offices at the end of March 2018, and the trustees began the task of officially winding up the charity which was completed on 5 March 2019.

== History ==
Originally named Selby and District Disability Information and Advice Line (D.I.A.L.), the charity at first operated as a part-time telephone helpline, staffed entirely by volunteers.

On 16 November 2001, Selby and District DIAL received £219,273 in funding from the National Lottery's Community Fund. This three-year award made it possible for DIAL to move in 2002 into larger premises at 12 Park Street, Selby where they set up a "one stop shop" for people with disabilities, and a display area for aids and equipment.

In September 2010 – after a major funding crisis – the charity received a further major five-year funding boost of £344,445 from the Big Lottery Fund. This funding enabled Selby and District DIAL to take on paid staff and expand its services to include welfare rights advice, form-filling, benefit checks, representation at tribunal, home visits, outreach sessions, activity and support groups, signposting to other agencies, information, and short-term wheelchair hire.

In April 2015, an application for a grant of £12,661.77 from Selby Town Council – seeking continued funding for a specialist disability welfare rights advisor – reported that "The funding of this post during 2014 enabled £2,121,108.98 of previously unclaimed benefits to be secured for disabled people in Selby District and in excess of £1,000,000 of this was secured for people within Selby Town area."

In January 2018, two years after their Big Lottery money ran out, it was announced that due to a lack of funding, Selby and District DIAL would have to close by the end of March 2018. The service would instead become a project of Age UK Selby District, operating a part-time telephone help line, with form-filling being carried out over the phone and through home visits. Due to Age UK's constitution, the service would also only be able to help clients aged fifty years or over, and others would be signposted to organisations such as Citizens Advice which would be able to help. The future of its Disability Awareness project, which it ran in local schools and would require a new home, was uncertain at this point.

Selby and District DIAL has now been officially wound-up and was removed from the Charity Commission's register on 5 March 2019 as it had ceased to exist.
