= St John the Baptist's Church, Haddlesey =

Church in Chapel Haddlesey, North Yorkshire, England

Coordinates: 53.7279°N 1.1183°W

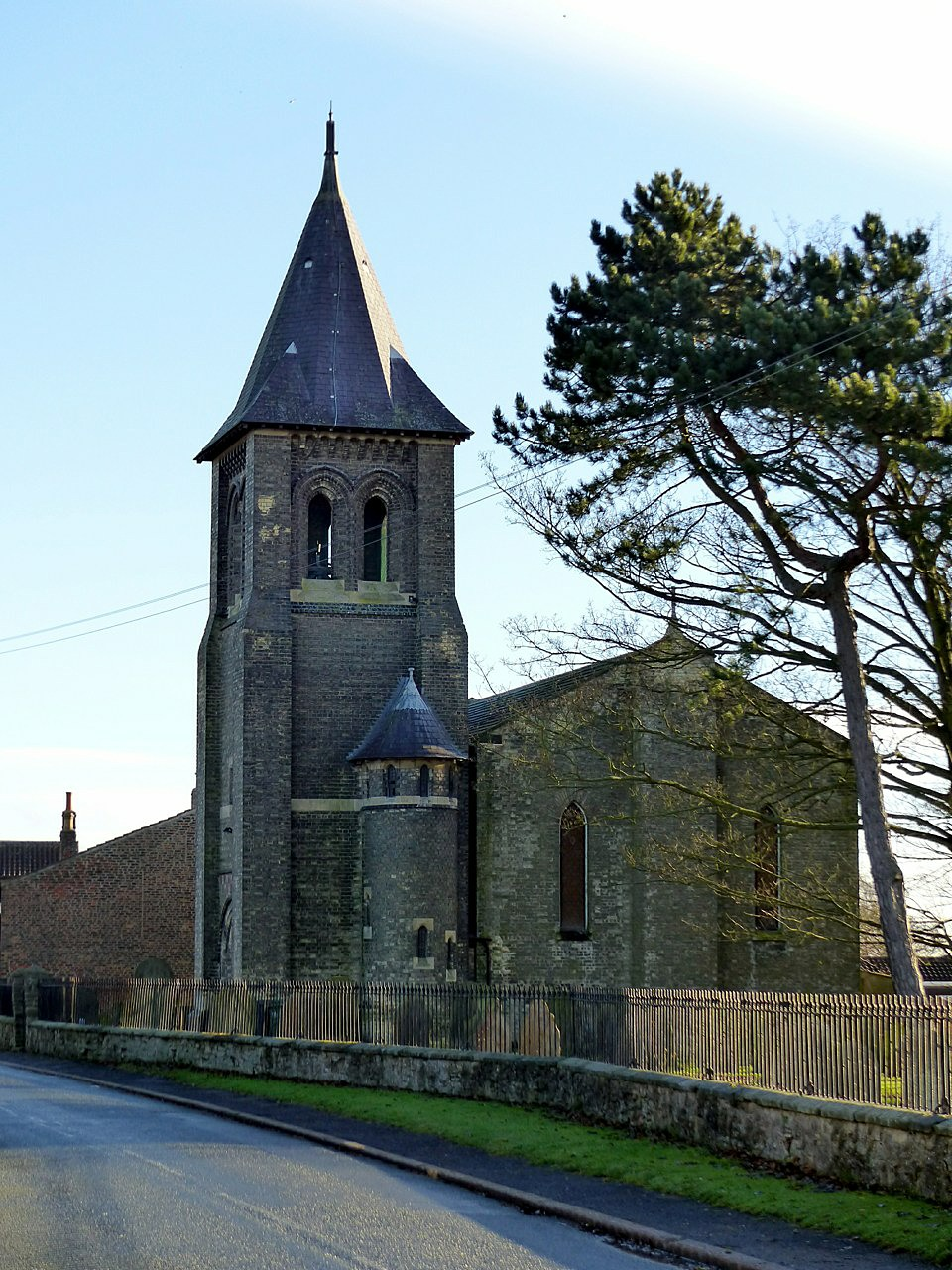
The church, in 2018

St John the Baptist's Church is an Anglican church in Chapel Haddlesey, a village in North Yorkshire, in England.

The first church in Haddlesey was consecrated by Walter de Gray in 1237. It is recorded as having been rebuilt in 1312, and there is evidence that up to three chantry chapels were added to the building. In 1658, it was given its own parish, but in about 1660 that was merged into the parish of St Mary's Church, Birkin.

The church was entirely rebuilt in 1836 and enlarged, to provided seating for 250 worshippers, at a cost of £700. In 1873, it was once again given its own parish. The church was enlarged in 1878 with the addition of a chancel and a vestry, to a design by William Milford Teulon. In 1884 the wooden font was replaced by a stone font. In 1891, a tower and spire were erected, along with a porch, and the interior was rearranged.
