= Huddleston Hall =

Manor house in North Yorkshire, England

Coordinates: 53°48′00″N 1°17′35″W

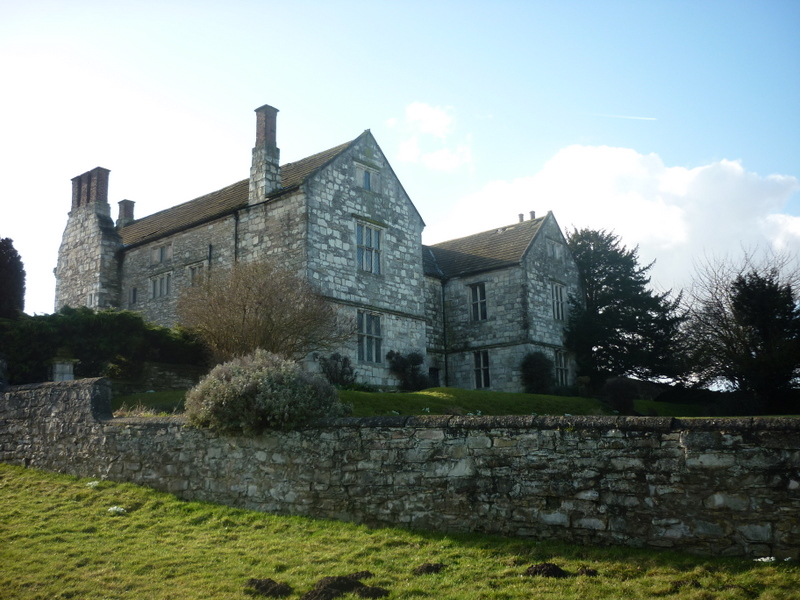
The building, in 2011

Huddleston Hall is a historic building in Huddleston with Newthorpe, a civil parish in North Yorkshire, in England.

The manor house was constructed around 1700, for the Hungate family, with stables being constructed at the same time. However, the 15th-century former chapel survives from an earlier hall built by the Langton family, having later been converted into a barn. The hall was later converted into a farmhouse. It was altered in about 1912, when an additional entrance was inserted. The hall, chapel, and stables, are all separately grade II* listed. The hall was placed on the Heritage at Risk Register due to the poor condition of its roofs, although some emergency work was undertaken, and a plan put in place to fully restore them.

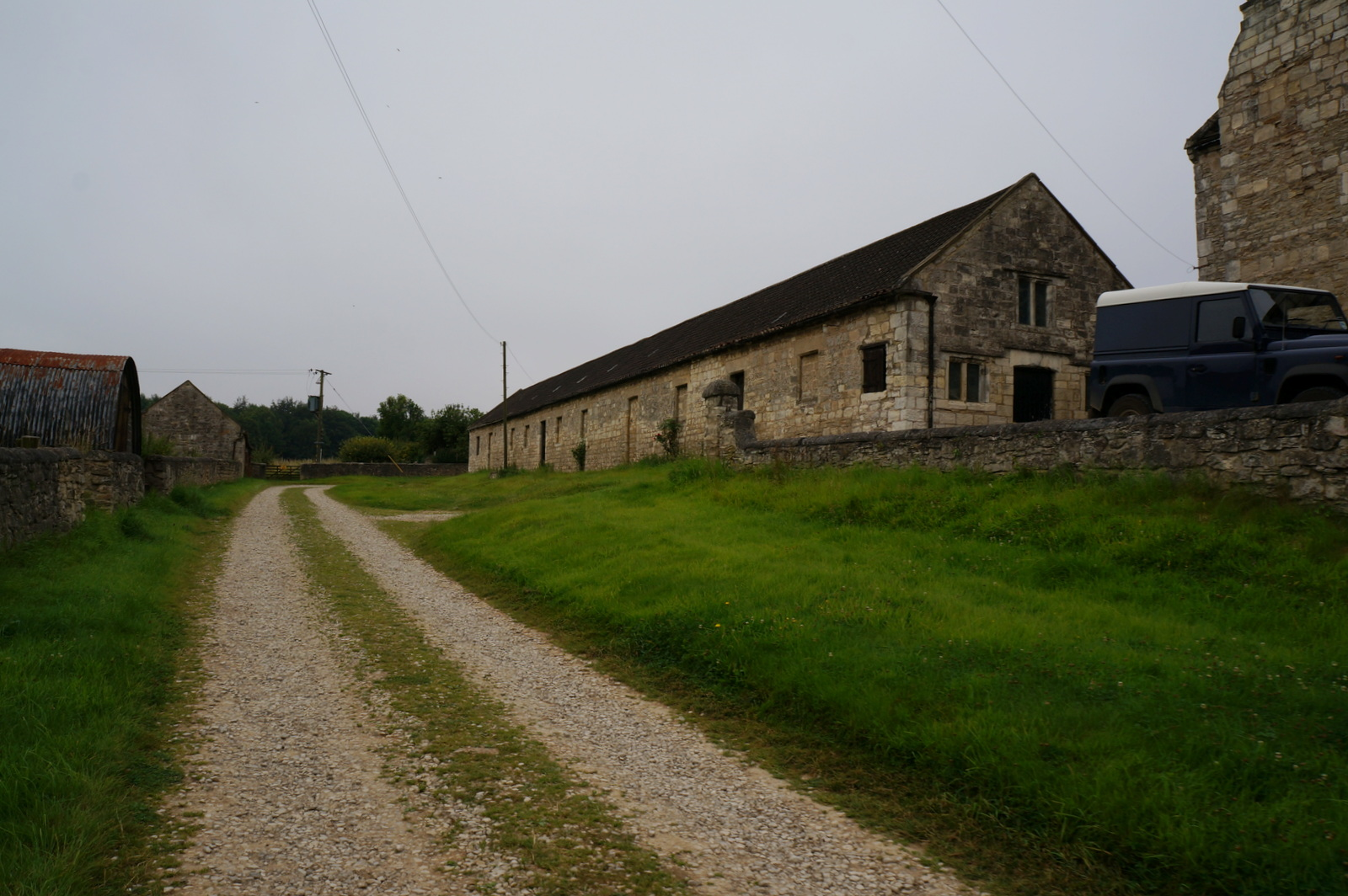
The stables

The hall is built of limestone on a plinth, with quoins, a floor band, and a stone slate roof with shaped kneelers and stone coping. There are two storeys and attics and a cellar to the right, and an H-shaped plan consisting of a single bay flanked by single-bay gabled cross-wings. In the centre are two Tudor arched entrances with quoined and chamfered jambs. The windows are mullioned, and most also have transoms, with those on the upper floors being smaller than those on the ground floor. Inside, there is a hall with a great chamber above. Few historic features survive inside, but both the main and service staircases are early, and originally had large turned balusters.

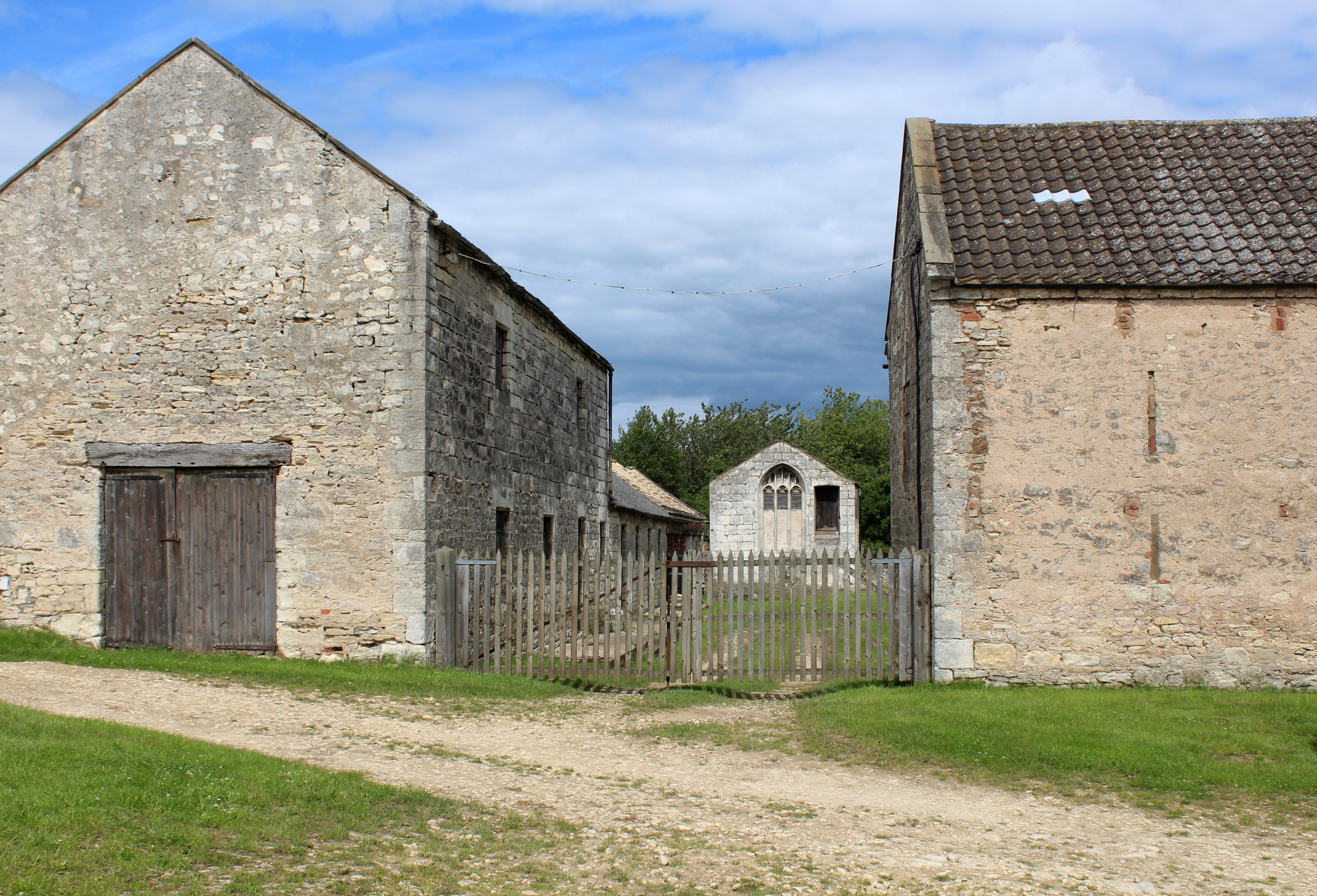
The chapel

The chapel is built of magnesian limestone with a stone slate roof. The openings include a doorway with a moulded surround, a three-light window with a pointed head containing Perpendicular tracery, and a doorway with a Tudor arched lintel.

The stables are also built of magnesian limestone and have a pantile roof with stone coping. There is a single storey and twelve bays. The south gable end contains a doorway with a chamfered surround and a Tudor arch, flanked by two-light mullioned windows under a continuous stepped hood mould. On the sides are stable doors and windows, some with Tudor-arched lintels and some with chamfered surrounds.

== See also ==
- Grade II* listed buildings in North Yorkshire (district)
- Listed buildings in Huddleston with Newthorpe
