= 2015 Selby District Council election =

2015 UK local government election

2015 Selby District Council Council election
- 7 May 2015

All 31 seats to Selby District Council 16 seats needed for a majority
	First party	Second party	Third party
	Con	Lab	Ind
Leader	Mark Crane	Steven Shaw-Wright
Party	Conservative	Labour	Independent
Leader's seat	Brayton	Selby West (defeated)
Last election	29 seats, 53.2%	10 seats, 37.6%	2 seats, 7.9%
Seats won	22	8	1
Seat change	▼7	▼2	▼1
Popular vote	22,275	14,966	2,220
Percentage	49.5%	33.0%	7.1%
Swing	▼6.8%	▼4.3%	▼0.8%
Council control before election
Conservative
Council control after election
Conservative

The 2015 Selby District Council election took place on 7 May 2015 to elect members of the Selby District Council in England. It was held on the same day as other local elections.
