= Gateforth Hall =

House in Gateforth, North Yorkshire, England

Coordinates: 53°45′34″N 1°09′29″W

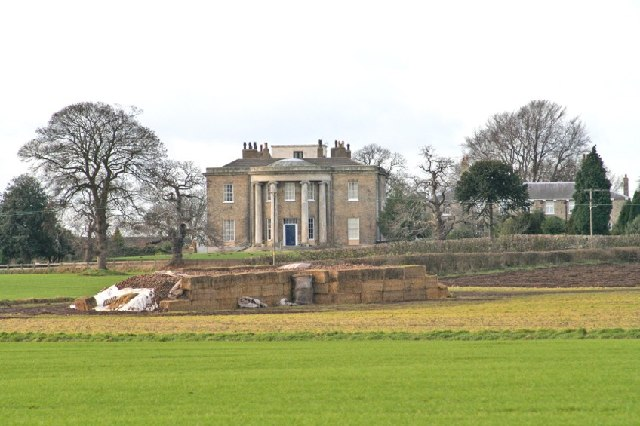
The building, in 2006

Gateforth Hall is a historic building in Gateforth, a village in North Yorkshire, in England.

The building was constructed between 1812 and 1814 for Humphrey Osbalderston. His main home was Hunmanby Hall, so Gateforth was only occupied for part of the year, and was effectively used as a hunting lodge. In 1897, Osbalderston's descendents sold the house to Leeds City Council, which converted it into a hospital for people with tuberculosis. In 1977, it was converted into a nightclub, and then became a hotel, before being converted back into an eight-bedroom house. In 2015, the house was put up for sale, with an asking price of £1.35 million. It has been grade II* listed since 1978.

The house is built gault brick, with dressings in magnesian limestone, the basement in red brick, with a cornice, a low parapet, and a hipped grey slate roof. It has two storeys and a basement, a main block with a square plan and three bays, and an entrance hall and a service wing to the right. In the centre is a full-height bow approached by curved steps, with a portico of four giant Ionic columns, a frieze, a cornice and a low parapet. In the centre, steps lead to a doorway with fluted jambs and a rectangular fanlight. The windows on the front are sashes, those in the ground floor with aprons. The service wing has two storeys, seven bays, and modillion eaves brackets. Inside, there are a full-height entrance hall with a moulded ceiling and roof light, an oak staircase with an iron balustrade, and various marble fireplaces.

== See also ==
- Grade II* listed buildings in North Yorkshire (district)
- Listed buildings in Gateforth
