= Newthorpe, North Yorkshire =

Village in North Yorkshire, England

Coordinates: 53.78403°N 1.29120°W

Newthorpe
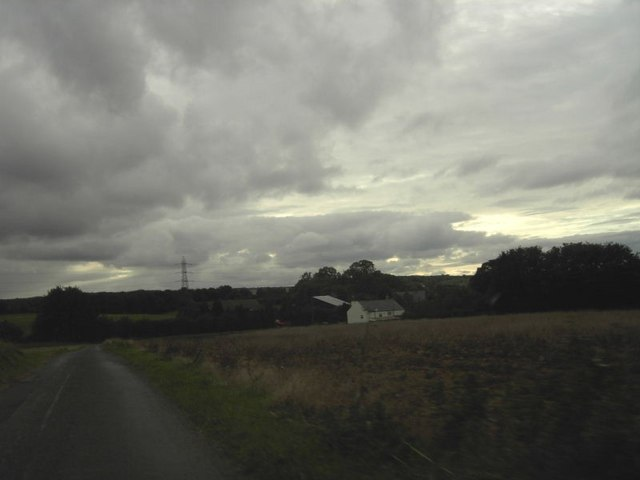
- View of Newthorpe from Gorse Lane

- Location within North Yorkshire
- OS grid reference: SE468322
- Civil parish: Huddleston with Newthorpe
- Unitary authority: North Yorkshire
- Ceremonial county: North Yorkshire
- Region: Yorkshire and the Humber
- Country: England
- Sovereign state: United Kingdom
- Post town: LEEDS
- Postcode district: LS25
- Police: North Yorkshire
- Fire: North Yorkshire
- Ambulance: Yorkshire
- UK Parliament: Selby

Newthorpe is a settlement lying alongside the B1222 road, in the civil parish of Huddleston with Newthorpe, to the west of Sherburn in Elmet village and stretching across to the A1(M) Motorway in the English county of North Yorkshire.

Until 1974 it was part of the West Riding of Yorkshire. From 1974 to 2023 it was part of the Selby District, it is now administered by the unitary North Yorkshire Council.

Newthorpe was formerly a township in the parish of Sherburn, in 1866 Newthorpe became a separate civil parish, on 1 April 1937 the parish was abolished and merged with Huddleston cum Lumby to form "Huddleston with Newthorpe". In 1931 the parish had a population of 111.

== See also ==
- Listed buildings in Huddleston with Newthorpe
