= 2019 Selby District Council election =

2019 UK local government election

- 2 May 2019

All 31 seats to Selby District Council 16 seats needed for a majority
	First party	Second party
	Con	Lab
Leader	Mark Crane	Robert Packham
Party	Conservative	Labour
Leader's seat	Brayton	Sherburn in Elmet
Last election	22 seats, 54.7%	8 seats, 33.0%
Seats won	16	8
Seat change	▼6	Steady
Popular vote	15,156	10,496
Percentage	47.7%	33.0%
Swing	▼7.0%	±0.0%
	Third party	Fourth party
	YP	Ind
Leader	Michael Jordan
Party	Yorkshire	Independent
Leader's seat	Camblesforth and Carlton
Last election	Did not stand	1 seat, 4.5%
Seats won	4	3
Seat change	▲4	▲2
Popular vote	3,023	2,764
Percentage	9.5%	8.7%
Swing	▲9.5%	▲4.2%
- Map showing the results of the 2019 Selby District Council elections. Blue showing Conservative, Red showing Labour, Light Blue showing the Yorkshire Party and Grey showing Independents. Striped wards have mixed representation.
Council control before election
Conservative
Council control after election
Conservative

The 2019 Selby District Council election was held on 2 May 2019 to elect members of Selby District Council in England. It was the final election to the authority before its dissolution in 2023, and subsequent subsumption into the unitary North Yorkshire Council.

The election saw the Conservative Party maintain overall control of the District Council with a reduced majority.

The election was noted for the surprise success of the Yorkshire Party, who won four seats on the council, which remains their best performance to date in a local authority election. However, two of the four councillors elected for the party would rejoin the Conservative Party the following year, a third would resign with their seat being won by the Conservatives in the ensuing by-election, while the fourth would eventually join the Labour Party, leaving the Yorkshire Party with no representation on the council by 2022.

== Background ==
At the previous Selby District Council election, 22 seats were won by the Conservative Party, 8 seats were won by the Labour Party, and one independent candidate, Mary McCartney, was elected in the Eggborough ward. Over the next four years, the following seat changes occurred:

- Jack Crawford, elected as a Labour Party councillor for Byram and Brotherton, died in early 2016. The resulting by-election was won by Bryn Sage of the Conservative Party.
- Donald Bain-Mackay, elected as a Conservative Party councillor for Tadcaster, resigned from the Conservatives early in 2017 in order to run as an independent candidate for North Yorkshire County Council at that year's election.
- Michael Jordan, elected as a Conservative Party councillor for Camblesforth and Carlton, defected to the Yorkshire Party in July 2018.

== Results summary ==
Selby District Council election, 2019
Party	Candidates						Votes		
Party	Stood	Elected	Gained	Unseated	Net	% of total	%	No.	Net %
Conservative	26	16			▼6	51.6%	47.7%	15,156	▼7%
Labour	24	8			Steady	25.8%	33.0%	10,496	±0.0%
Yorkshire	5	4			▲4	12.9%	9.5%	3,023	N/A
Independent	3	3			▲2	9.7%	8.7%	2,764	▲4.2%
Socialist Labour	1	0	0	0	Steady	0%	0.7%	216	N/A
UKIP	1	0	0	0	Steady	0%	0.3%	106	▼5.2%

== Results by Ward ==
=== Appleton Roebuck and Church Fenton ===
Appleton Roebuck and Church Fenton (2 seats)
Party	Candidate	Votes	%	±%
Conservative	Richard Musgrave	1,072	64.6	
Conservative	Keith Ellis	1,036	62.4	
Labour	Andrew Lowe	489	29.5	
Labour	John Rushby	465	28.0	
Majority		547	33.0	
Registered electors		4,585		
Turnout		1,729	37.71	
Rejected ballots		70	4.0	
Conservative hold		Swing		
Conservative hold		Swing		

=== Barlby Village ===
Barlby Village
Party	Candidate	Votes	%	±%
Labour	Stephanie Duckett	295	52.7	−0.6
Conservative	Ian Lawton	265	47.3	+0.6
Majority		30	5.4	
Registered electors		2,396		
Turnout		589	24.58	
Rejected ballots		29	4.9	
Labour hold		Swing		

=== Brayton ===
Brayton (2 seats)
Party	Candidate	Votes	%	±%
Conservative	Mark Crane	898	61.2	
Conservative	Ian Chilvers	879	59.9	
Labour	Eva Lambert	553	37.7	
Majority		326	22.2	
Registered electors		4,882		
Turnout		1,506	30.85	
Rejected ballots		38	2.5	
Conservative hold		Swing		
Conservative hold		Swing		

=== Byram and Brotherton ===
Byram and Brotherton
Party	Candidate	Votes	%	±%
Yorkshire	Eleanor Jordan	320	45.3	N/A
Conservative	Bryn Sage	245	34.7	+2.1
Labour	Craig Laskey	142	20.1	−23.9
Majority		75	10.6	
Registered electors		2,269		
Turnout		719	31.69	
Rejected ballots		12	1.7	
Yorkshire gain from Labour		Swing		

=== Camblesforth and Carlton ===
Camblesforth and Carlton (2 seats)
Party	Candidate	Votes	%	±%
Yorkshire	Paul Welburn	799	55.3	
Yorkshire	Michael Jordan	702	48.6	
Conservative	Craig Blakey	365	25.3	
Labour	David Leake	345	23.9	
Conservative	Connor Brocklesby	330	22.8	
Majority		337	23.3	
Registered electors		4,612		
Turnout		1,469	31.85	
Rejected ballots		25	1.7	
Yorkshire gain from Conservative		Swing		
Yorkshire gain from Conservative		Swing		

=== Cawood and Wistow ===
Cawood and Wistow
Party	Candidate	Votes	%	±%
Conservative	John Cattanach	582	75.1	+2.7
Labour	Susan Andrew	193	24.9	−2.7
Majority		389	50.2	
Registered electors		2,435		
Turnout		805	33.06	
Rejected ballots		30	3.7	
Conservative hold		Swing		

=== Derwent ===
Derwent (2 seats)
Party	Candidate	Votes	%	±%
Conservative	Christopher Topping	781	64.2	
Conservative	Karl Arthur	657	54.0	
Labour	Neal Seargent	407	33.5	
Majority		250	20.6	
Registered electors		4,359		
Turnout		1,276	29.27	
Rejected ballots		60	4.7	
Conservative hold		Swing		
Conservative hold		Swing		

=== Eggborough ===
Eggborough
Party	Candidate	Votes	%	±%
Independent	Mary McCartney	673	84.2	+23.2
Conservative	Alexander Bruce	124	15.5	−6.7
Majority		549	68.7	
Registered electors		2,363		
Turnout		815	34.49	
Rejected ballots		16	2.0	
Independent hold		Swing		

=== Escrick ===
Escrick
Party	Candidate	Votes	%	±%
Conservative	Neil Reader	471	67.1	−2.6
Labour	Kevin Riley	231	32.9	+15.1
Majority		240	34.2	
Registered electors		1,919		
Turnout		731	38.09	
Rejected ballots		29	4.0	
Conservative hold		Swing		

=== Hambleton ===
Hambleton
Party	Candidate	Votes	%	±%
Conservative	Christopher Pearson	383	49.4	−19.5
Yorkshire	Scott Conor	277	35.7	N/A
Labour	Anne Riley	116	14.9	−16.2
Majority		106	13.7	
Registered electors		2,146		
Turnout		779	36.30	
Rejected ballots		3	0.4	
Conservative hold		Swing		

=== Monk Fryston ===
Monk Fryston
Party	Candidate	Votes	%	±%
Conservative	John Mackman	590	77.5	+8.9
Labour	Claire Stephenson	171	22.5	−8.9
Majority		419	55.1	
Registered electors		2,357		
Turnout		788	33.43	
Rejected ballots		27	3.4	
Conservative hold		Swing		

=== Riccall ===
Riccall
Party	Candidate	Votes	%	±%
Labour	John Duggan	357	50.3	+24.7^{1}
Conservative	Charles Richardson	353	49.7	+8.6
Majority		4	0.6	
Registered electors		1,977		
Turnout		731	36.98	
Rejected ballots		21	2.9	
Labour gain from Conservative		Swing		

^{1} - Swing is compared to the Labour Party's performance in 2015, rather than Duggan's performance as an independent candidate that year.

=== Selby East ===
Selby East (3 seats)
Party	Candidate	Votes	%	±%
Labour	Wendy Nichols	570	58.3	
Labour	Steven Shaw-Wright	529	54.1	
Labour	Paul Welch	520	53.2	
Conservative	Joshua Crane	365	37.4	
Conservative	Conor Dickinson	355	36.3	
Majority		155	15.9	
Registered electors		5,407		
Turnout		1,032	19.09	
Rejected ballots		55	5.3	
Labour hold		Swing		
Labour hold		Swing		
Labour hold		Swing		

=== Selby West ===
Selby West (3 seats)
Party	Candidate	Votes	%	±%
Conservative	Judith Chilvers	875	49.6	
Labour	Jennifer Shaw-Wright	847	48.0	
Labour	Keith Franks	798	45.2	
Labour	Malik Mohd Rofidi	677	38.4	
Socialist Labour	Ian Wilson	216	12.2	
Majority		121	6.9	
Registered electors		7,427		
Turnout		1,833	24.68	
Rejected ballots		68	3.7	
Conservative hold		Swing		
Labour hold		Swing		
Labour hold		Swing		

=== Sherburn In Elmet ===
Sherburn In Elmet (3 seats)
Party	Candidate	Votes	%	±%
Yorkshire	David Brook	925	52.4	
Conservative	David Buckle	816	46.3	
Labour	Robert Packham	769	43.6	
Conservative	Alexander Tant-Brown	682	38.7	
Labour	Dennis Baillie	521	29.5	
Majority		87	4.9	
Registered electors		5,970		
Turnout		1,778	29.78	
Rejected ballots		14	0.8	
Yorkshire gain from Conservative		Swing		
Conservative hold		Swing		
Labour hold		Swing		

=== South Milford ===
South Milford
Party	Candidate	Votes	%	±%
Conservative	Timothy Grogan	426	67.4	+7.5
Labour	Tracey Woods	206	32.6	+6.2
Majority		220	34.8	
Registered electors		2,054		
Turnout		666	32.42	
Rejected ballots		34	5.1	
Conservative hold		Swing		

=== Tadcaster ===
Tadcaster (3 seats)
Party	Candidate	Votes	%	±%
Independent	Donald Bain-Mackay	1,526	72.7	
Conservative	Richard Sweeting	1,056	50.3	
Conservative	Andrew Lee	801	38.2	
Labour	Stephen Cobb	611	29.1	
Labour	David Bowgett	454	21.6	
Majority		190	9.1	
Registered electors		5,931		
Turnout		2,108	35.54	
Rejected ballots		10	0.5	
Independent gain from Conservative		Swing		
Conservative hold		Swing		
Conservative hold		Swing		

=== Thorpe Willoughby ===
Thorpe Willoughby
Party	Candidate	Votes	%	±%
Conservative	Clifford Lunn	480	67.6	+4.7
Labour	Gavin Harding	230	32.4	−4.7
Majority		250	35.2	
Registered electors		2,493		
Turnout		742	29.76	
Rejected ballots		32	4.3	
Conservative hold		Swing		

=== Whitley ===
Whitley
Party	Candidate	Votes	%	±%
Independent	John McCartney	565	60.1	+19.6
Conservative	Laura Watkinson-Teo	269	28.6	−15.2
UKIP	Neil Lockwood	106	11.3	N/A
Majority		296	31.5	
Registered electors		2,352		
Turnout		940	39.97	
Rejected ballots		0	0.0	
Independent gain from Conservative		Swing		

== Changes 2019–2023 ==
- Eleanor Jordan and Michael Jordan, elected as Yorkshire Party councillors for Byram and Brotherton and Camblesforth and Carlton respectively, both defected to the Conservative Party in August 2020.
- John Cattanach, elected as a Conservative Party councillor for Cawood and Wistow, was expelled from the party in April 2022 for declaring as an independent candidate at the 2022 North Yorkshire Council election, and subsequently sat as an independent.
- Neil Reader, elected as a Conservative Party councillor for Escrick, resigned from the party in May 2022, and subsequently sat as an independent.
- David Brook, elected as a Yorkshire Party councillor for Sherburn in Elmet, defected to the Labour Party in May 2022.
- In the second half of 2022, Labour councillor Robert Packham ceased to be a councillor for Sherburn in Elmet; the seat remained vacant until the council was abolished.
- On 1 April 2023, Selby District Council was abolished and its functions passed to the unitary North Yorkshire Council.

=== By-elections ===
==== Camblesforth and Carlton ====
The Camblesforth and Carlton by-election was triggered by the resignation of Yorkshire Party councillor Paul Welburn.

Camblesforth and Carlton by-election, 6 May 2021
Party	Candidate	Votes	%	±%
Conservative	Charles Richardson	996	66.4	+42.2
Labour	David Bowgett	342	22.8	−0.1
Green	Barry Jones	162	10.8	N/A
Majority		654	43.6	
Turnout		1,511	32	
Rejected ballots		11	0.7	
Registered electors		4,727		
Conservative gain from Yorkshire		Swing		

==== Byram and Brotherton ====
The Byram and Brotherton by-election followed the resignation of Conservative councillor Eleanor Jordan, who had been elected for the Yorkshire Party in 2019 before joining the Conservatives.

Byram and Brotherton by-election, 20 January 2022
Party	Candidate	Votes	%	±%
Conservative	Georgina Ashton	215	48.1	+13.4
Labour	Matthew Burton	207	46.3	+26.2
Green	Cherry Waters	25	5.6	N/A
Majority		8	1.8	
Turnout		448	19.42	
Rejected ballots		1	0.2	
Registered electors		2,307		
Conservative hold		Swing	▼6.4	
