= West Haddlesey =

Village and civil parish in North Yorkshire, England

Coordinates: 53.733185°N 1.144462°W

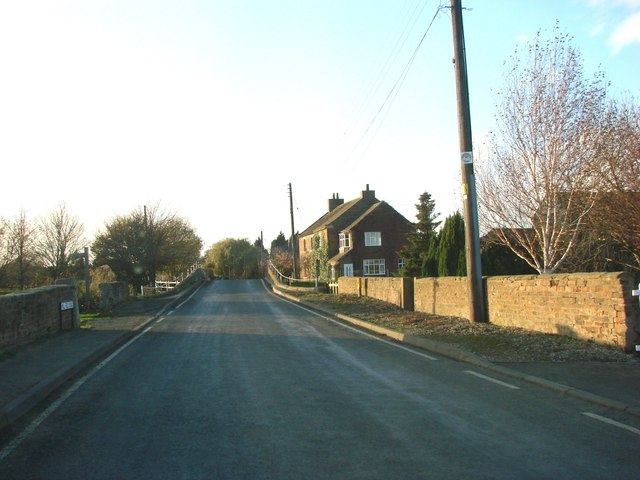
- The Canal Bridge, West Haddlesey

- Location within North Yorkshire
- Population: 214 (2011 census)
- Unitary authority: North Yorkshire
- Ceremonial county: North Yorkshire
- Region: Yorkshire and the Humber
- Country: England
- Sovereign state: United Kingdom
- Post town: Selby
- Postcode district: YO8
- Police: North Yorkshire
- Fire: North Yorkshire
- Ambulance: Yorkshire

West Haddlesey is a village and civil parish in the county of North Yorkshire, England. In the 2011 census, it had about 78 houses and a population of 214. The mouth of the Selby Canal lies to the south of the village and joins onto the River Aire.

The village was historically part of the West Riding of Yorkshire until 1974. From 1974 to 2023 it was part of the Selby District. It is now administered by the unitary North Yorkshire Council.

The village formally had a public house called the George and Dragon Inn, but this was closed due to a 'deliberate' fire in March 2019. It has now been converted into an Indian restaurant. The village shares a primary school with the neighbouring village of Chapel Haddlesey.
