= Listed buildings in Huddleston with Newthorpe =

Huddleston with Newthorpe is a civil parish in the county of North Yorkshire, England. It contains nine listed buildings that are recorded in the National Heritage List for England. Of these, three are at Grade II*, the middle of the three grades, and the others are at Grade II, the lowest grade. The most important building in the parish is Huddleston Hall, which is listed. Apart from a railway underbridge, all the other listed buildings are structures associated with the hall and in its surroundings.

== Key ==
Grade	Criteria
II*	Particularly important buildings of more than special interest
II	Buildings of national importance and special interest

== Buildings ==
Name and location	Photograph	Date	Notes	Grade
Former chapel west of Huddleston Hall; 53.80000°N 1.29331°W		15th century	The chapel, later converted into a barn, is in magnesian limestone with a stone slate roof. The openings include a doorway with a moulded surround, a three-light window with a pointed head containing Perpendicular tracery, and a doorway with a Tudor arched lintel.	II*
Gate piers east of Huddleston Hall; 53.80005°N 1.29263°W	—	Late 16th century (probable)	The gate piers are in magnesian limestone, with a square plan, and are about 2.5 metres (8 ft 2 in) high. Each pier has a moulded cornice, and a ball finial on a moulded base.	II
Stables southeast of Huddleston Hall; 53.79972°N 1.29285°W		Late 16th century (probable)	The stables are in magnesian limestone and have a pantile roof with stone coping. There is a single storey and twelve bays. The south gable end contains a doorway with a chamfered surround and a Tudor arch, flanked by two-light mullioned windows under a continuous stepped hood mould. On the sides are stable doors and windows, some with Tudor-arched lintels and some with chamfered surrounds.	II*
Huddleston Hall; 53.80002°N 1.29294°W		Early 17th century (probable)	A manor house in limestone on a plinth, with quoins, a floor band, and a stone slate roof with shaped kneelers and stone coping. There are two storeys and attics and a cellar to the right, and an H-shaped plan consisting of a single bay flanked by single-bay gabled cross-wings. In the centre are two Tudor arched entrances with quoined and chamfered jambs. The windows are mullioned, and most also have transoms.	II*
Stables south of Huddleston Hall; 53.79992°N 1.29297°W	—	17th century (probable)	The stables are in magnesian limestone, with rebuilding in brick, and a pantile roof. There is a single storey and eight bays. The building contains three stable openings, and other openings, some blocked.	II
Stables with hayloft southwest of Huddleston Hall; 53.79979°N 1.29361°W	—	17th century (probable)	The building is in magnesian limestone, with additions in brick, and a roof of pantile and asbestos. There is a single storey and eight bays, and an additional storey on the four east bays. The building contains alternate stable entrances with Tudor arches, and the other openings have chamfered lintels.	II
Gate piers north of Huddleston Hall; 53.80036°N 1.29241°W	—	c. 1700	The gate piers are in magnesian limestone, they have an approximately square plan, and are about 2.5 metres (8 ft 2 in) high. Each pier has a stepped and moulded cornice with a frieze, and a further cornice with a ball finial on a shaped base.	II
Newthorpe Cattle Creep Bridge; 53.78694°N 1.31144°W	—	c. 1830–34	The accommodation bridge was built by the Leeds and Selby Railway to allow the movement of livestock. It is an underbridge in limestone and consists of a single semicircular arch carrying four railway tracks. The arch springs from an impost band with voussoirs and a keystone. The sides are coped and chamfered. On the south side is a pair of pyramidal buttresses, and on the north face is a pair of curving abutment walls.	II
Barn south of Huddleston Hall; 53.79952°N 1.29342°W	—	19th century (probable)	The barn is in magnesian limestone with a pantile roof. There are two storeys and three bays. It contains a central segmental-arched cart entrance, flanked by stable doorways each with a chamfered Tudor arched lintel, block slit vents, and a cart entrance at the rear.	II
