= Gateforth =

Village and civil parish in North Yorkshire, England

Coordinates: 53°45′03″N 1°09′08″W

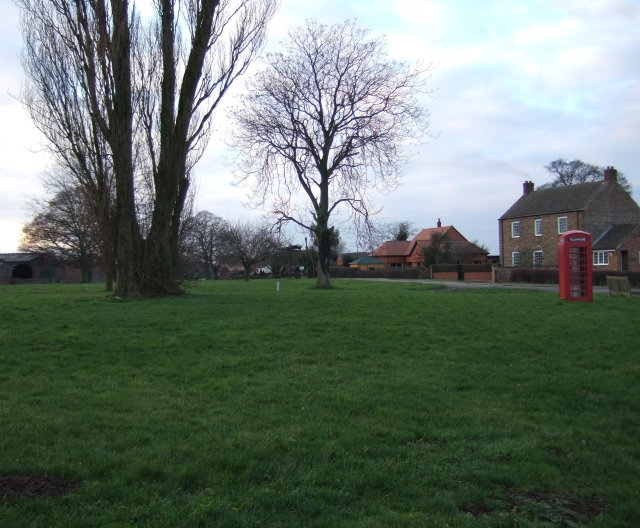
- Gateforth Village Green

- Location within North Yorkshire
- Population: 240 (2011 census)
- OS grid reference: SE557286
- Civil parish: Gateforth
- Unitary authority: North Yorkshire
- Ceremonial county: North Yorkshire
- Region: Yorkshire and the Humber
- Country: England
- Sovereign state: United Kingdom
- Post town: SELBY
- Postcode district: YO8
- Dialling code: 01757
- Police: North Yorkshire
- Fire: North Yorkshire
- Ambulance: Yorkshire

Gateforth is a small village and civil parish located in North Yorkshire, England. The village is 4 miles (6 km) south west of the town of Selby and 1.4 miles (2 km) south of the village of Hambleton, where a shop a hotel and one pub are located. Gateforth is approximately 20 miles (32 km) east of Leeds. According to the 2011 UK census, the village had a population of 240 with 94 households. The village was historically part of the West Riding of Yorkshire until 1974. From 1974 to 2023 it was part of the Selby District, it is now administered by the unitary North Yorkshire Council.

== Notable buildings ==
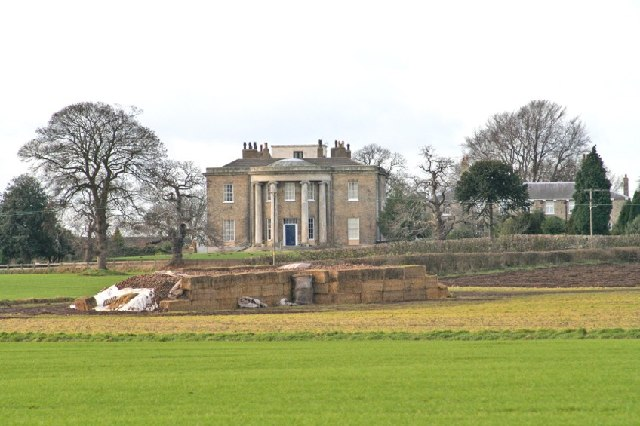
Gateforth Hall

Gateforth Hall was built in 1812 by influential local landowner Sir Humphrey Brooke Osbaldeston – at one time sheriff of York – and used as a meet for Bramham Moor Hunt. Subsequently it was used as a hospital for tuberculosis patients and later a restaurant. As of 2013, it was for sale as a house. It is a Grade II* listed building. Other notable listed buildings on the former Gateforth Hall estate include a ha-ha (landscape feature) in the grounds and the coach house. Selby Golf Club is located 2 miles (3 km) north east of Gateforth. The 71 par course was established as a club in 1907.
