= Temple Cowton Preceptory =

Former religious house in North Yorkshire, England

Coordinates: 54.424°N 1.534°W

Temple Cowton Preceptory was a priory in North Yorkshire, England. The preceptory was in the village of East Cowton, 5 miles (8 km) north west of Northallerton. Temple Cowton was founded in c. 1142 by the Knights Templar and was regarded as an important location on account of Edward I starting there in 1300, and at its suppression in 1308, various documents relating to all their possessions and estates in England and Scotland, were found at Temple Cowton.

As with other sites owned by the Knights Templar, after the order was suppressed, their estates were given to the Knights Hospitaller.
