= Selby Canal =

Canal with 2 locks in Yorkshire, England

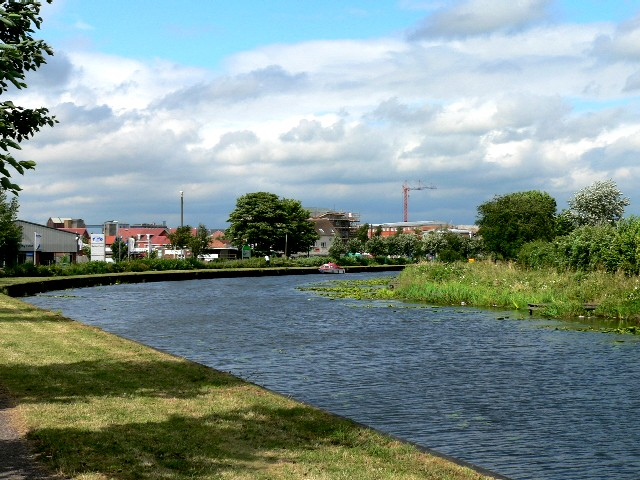
- The canal approaching the River Ouse

Specifications
- Length: 6 miles (9.7 km)
- Maximum boat length: 78 ft 6 in (23.93 m)
- Maximum boat beam: 16 ft 6 in (5.03 m)
- Locks: 2
- Status: navigable
- Navigation authority: Canal and River Trust

History
- Original owner: Aire and Calder Navigation
- Principal engineer: William Jessop
- Other engineer: John Gott
- Date of act: 14 June 1774
- Date completed: 29 April 1778

Geography
- Start point: West Haddesley
- End point: Selby
- Connects to: Aire and Calder Navigation, River Ouse

The Selby Canal is a 6-mile (9.7 km) canal with two locks, which bypasses the lower reaches of the River Aire in Yorkshire, England, from the village of West Haddlesey to the town of Selby, where it joins the River Ouse. It opened in 1778, and provided the main outlet for the Aire and Calder Navigation until 1826, when it was bypassed by a new cut from Ferrybridge to Goole. Selby steadily declined after that, although traffic to York still used the canal.

Powers to increase its depth were obtained in 1828, and the residents of Selby used legal action to ensure that the company complied with its own act of Parliament. The locks were enlarged in 1885. Its subsequent history was uneventful, until the canal came under the control of British Waterways in 1962. When British Waterways also took control of the River Ouse, the canal was marketed as part of a through route to York, and the number of boats using it have steadily increased. Although not originally part of the canal, the section of the Aire from Dole Bank Lock to Haddlesey Flood Lock is usually considered to be part of the modern Selby Canal, making it 11.7 miles (18.8 km) long with four locks.

== History ==
In the late 1760s, there was dissatisfaction with the state of the Aire and Calder Navigation, and there were several schemes to bypass part or all of it. John Longbotham was employed by some of the backers for the Leeds and Liverpool Canal to survey a route from Leeds to Selby, although the Leeds and Selby Canal was not officially supported by the Leeds and Liverpool undertaking. The canal would have been just over 23 miles (37 km) long, with ten locks, a ten-arched aqueduct over the River Aire at Hunslet, and a 400-yard (370 m) tunnel at Fairburn. The estimated cost of £59,468 was raised in two months, and a bill was presented to Parliament in December 1772, as was another by the Aire and Calder Navigation for improvements to the Aire below Haddlesey. The parliamentary committee found a number of issues with the Leeds and Selby scheme, and generally favoured improvements to the Aire, but no decision was made on either proposal.

Aire and Calder Navigation Act 1774
- Act of Parliament
- Parliament of Great Britain
- Long title: An Act to amend an Act, passed in the Tenth and Eleventh Years of the Reign of King William the Third, intituled, "An Act for the making and keeping navigable the Rivers of Aire and Calder, in the County of York;" and for improving the Navigation of the said River Aire, from Weeland to the River Ouze; and for making a navigable Canal from the said River Aire, at or near Haddlesey, to the River Ouze, at the Old Brick Garth at Ouze Gate End, within the Township of Selby, in the said County; and for other Purposes.
- Citation: 14 Geo. 3. c. 96
- Territorial extent: Great Britain

Dates
- Royal assent: 14 June 1774
- Commencement: 13 January 1774 (Note: Start of session.)
Other legislation
Amends	Aire and Calder Navigation Act 1698
Amended by	Aire and Calder Navigation Act 1820; Aire and Calder Navigation Act 1889; British Transport Commission Act 1962

Status: Amended

Text of statute as originally enacted

Following the impasse, the Aire and Calder decided that a route to Selby might be a better solution than improvements to the lower Aire, and William Jessop, working for John Smeaton, surveyed a route that ran from Haddlesey to Selby, which would require a lock at Selby, where the canal joined the River Ouse, and floodgates at Haddlesey. By the spring of 1774, the Leeds and Selby Canal was supported by the Leeds and Liverpool company, and rival bills were presented to Parliament. The Leeds and Selby proposal was defeated, but the Aire and Calder bill became an act of Parliament, the Aire and Calder Navigation Act 1774 (14 Geo. 3. c. 96) on 14 June 1774.

The company employed Jessop as engineer on a part-time basis, with John Gott acting as the resident engineer. James and John Pinkerton were the main contractors, and construction began in early 1775. A great celebration was held at Selby on 29 April 1778, when the canal opened, having cost £20,000. The town of Selby flourished following the opening, with a custom house which enabled traffic to proceed straight to the North Sea without stopping at Hull. While the canal was fairly successful, there were some problems. There was a 2-mile (3.2 km) section where the banks consisted of loose sand, which had to be regularly dredged to prevent the sand blocking it, and Elias Wright, who was the engineer in 1797, complained that the depth of only 3.5 feet (1.1 m) was too shallow, and that extra boards had to be kept on Haddlesey weir to maintain the water levels. As cargoes increased the canal became too shallow for the larger barges.

=== Development ===
The new route provided a better route from Leeds and Wakefield to Hull, although it was a similar length to the route via the lower Aire, but considerably reduced the distance from Leeds to York. The port at Airmyn on the lower Aire closed in early 1779, and 8 acres (3.2 ha) of land were leased at Selby, on which to build port facilities and warehouses. Staithes were built in 1781 and 1782, and 1782 also saw the construction of a counting house, a warehouse, a rigging house, a tarring house, a sailmaker's shop, a crane and a repository for old ropes. Two cranes were erected in 1787, one on the canal and the other on the river, while an extra lock-keeper had to be employed in 1788 because of the volume of trade. Ten years later, John Foster built a private dry dock at Selby, where many of the boats of the Aire and Calder were repaired.

Before the building of the canal, Selby had been the furthest point upstream on the Ouse which could be reached by seagoing ships. Although some of the barges which used the canal travelled up the Ouse to York or down to the Humber Ports and the River Trent, this traffic was mainly restricted to coal, and other cargoes were transhipped at Selby. The larger Humber keels, sloops, schooners and brigs, some of 200 tons, carried the goods further afield. By 1800, some 369,780 tons were being handled, and industries such as ropemaking, sailmaking and shipbuilding thrived. In the twenty years from 1801 to 1821, the population of Selby increased from 2,861 to 4,097. Dividends paid by the Aire and Calder Navigation showed a large increase, from £11,625 in 1777 to £32,000 in 1791, much of which was funded by the increase in miscellaneous goods, including wool, bales of cloth and groceries, which the Selby Canal had promoted.

Of the trade above Haddlesey, around four-fifths travelled via Selby, with the rest using the lower Aire. The engineer George Leather, writing in 1822, noted that the route to Goole via Selby was much better than the lower Aire, but that it still suffered from problems. These included the size and depth of the canal, the provision of only one lock between the canal and the river, and that there were no docks at Selby, suitable for the brigs and other vessels that used the river. Meanwhile, the Aire and Calder were facing the prospect of rival schemes to provide canals parallel to the rivers. The Aire and Dun Canal was proposed in 1817, to run from Knottingley to Newbridge on the Dutch River, with a branch to Doncaster on the River Don Navigation, while the Went and Wakefield Canal would join the Barnsley Canal at Cold Hiendley to the River Don above Newbridge. To head off the competition, the Aire and Calder proposed a new cut from Knottingley to Goole, which included the provision of a cut at Bank Dole to maintain the connection to the Selby Canal. A petition was presented to Parliament in late 1819, and as a result of opposition, clauses were inserted to maintain the lower Aire and the Selby Canal, and to ensure parity of tolls on the new cut and the old routes.

=== Competition ===
Aire and Calder Navigation Act 1820
- Act of Parliament
- Parliament of the United Kingdom
- Long title: An Act to enable the Undertakers of the Navigation of the Rivers Aire and Calder, in the West Riding of the County of York, to make a Navigable Cut or Canal from and out of the said Navigation at Knottingley, to communicate with the River Ouze, near Goole, with Two Collateral Branches, all in the said Riding; and to amend the Acts relating to the said Navigation.
- Citation: 1 Geo. 4. c. xxxix
- Territorial extent: United Kingdom

Dates
- Royal assent: 30 June 1820
- Commencement: 30 June 1820 (Note: The Acts of Parliament (Commencement) Act 1793.)
Other legislation
Amends	Aire and Calder Navigation Act 1774
Amended by	Aire and Calder Navigation Act 1828; Aire and Calder Navigation Act 1889; Aire and Calder Navigation Act 1929; Aire and Calder Navigation Act 1934
Relates to	York and North Midland Railway Act 1836; North Midland Railway Act 1836; Manchester and Leeds Railway Act 1836; Wakefield, Pontefract and Goole Railway and Port of Goole Act 1846

Text of statute as originally enacted

An act of Parliament to authorise the new route and other works, the Aire and Calder Navigation Act 1820 (1 Geo. 4. c. xxxix) was obtained on 30 June 1820. The plans developed, with a basin and locks at Goole being added in 1821, and an increase in the navigable depth from 6 feet (1.8 m) to 7 feet (2.1 m) soon afterwards. John Rennie, the engineer for the project, died in 1821, and the following year George Leather, who took over this role, revealed plans for a ship dock at Goole, while in 1824 the start of the new cut was moved to Ferrybridge. Although a boat carrying directors travelled from Ferrybridge to Goole on 28 July 1825, the canal was not then complete. Opening eventually took place on 20 July 1826, partly due to a drought which delayed the filling of the cut. Boats could still reach the Selby Canal by using the Dole Bank Lock. The Aire and Calder company began to use Goole rather than Selby as the destination for all of their craft, and gradually hauliers and boat captains moved to the new location, resulting in a steady decline at Selby.

Further improvements to the Calder route to Wakefield were designed by Thomas Telford, while George Leather redesigned the Aire route to Leeds. The changes would allow 100-ton boats to reach both destinations, and became part of the Aire and Calder Navigation Act 1828 (9 Geo. 4. c. xcviii) which was obtained on 19 June 1828. This act included a provision to increase the navigable depth of the Selby Canal to 5 feet (1.5 m), which the company hoped to achieve by raising the dam boards on the weirs at Haddlesey and Beal. They knew that this was not actually legal, and a case brought before the Quarter Sessions upheld this position, so they started to make the channel wider and deeper. However, the residents of Selby were not satisfied, and further legal action by them resulted in the company having to carry out additional work in 1832 and 1833. The work included the provision of a new lock into the Ouse, as the old one was in a poor state of repair. Traders at Malton and York petitioned for the canal to be made deeper still in 1833, but their request was turned down. The partially derelict wharf wall at Selby was replaced in 1836, allowing fully laden ships to moor alongside it.

=== Decline ===
Although most traffic on the Aire and Calder now passed through Goole, trade with York continued to use the Selby Canal. The town of Selby declined, although there was a brief upturn in its fortunes in 1834, following the opening of the Leeds and Selby Railway, which lasted until 1840, when the railway from Selby to Hull opened. Lengthening of the locks on the main Aire and Calder lines to take compartment boats was completed by 1873, and the locks on the Selby line were rebuilt between 1885 and 1886. This work included Dole Bank Lock and Beal Lock, on the old course of the Aire, as well as Haddlesey Flood Lock and Selby Lock. The locks were made 78.5 by 16.5 feet (23.9 by 5.0 m), and the navigable depth was increased to 6 feet (1.8 m). The Aire and Calder remained highly successful, although little is heard of the Selby Canal after 1900.

In January 1948, private ownership of the canal ceased, when it was taken over by the British Transport Commission, as part of the post-war nationalisation. Several changes followed, until the British Waterways Board took control in 1962, later to become British Waterways, and now the Canal & River Trust.

== Leisure age ==
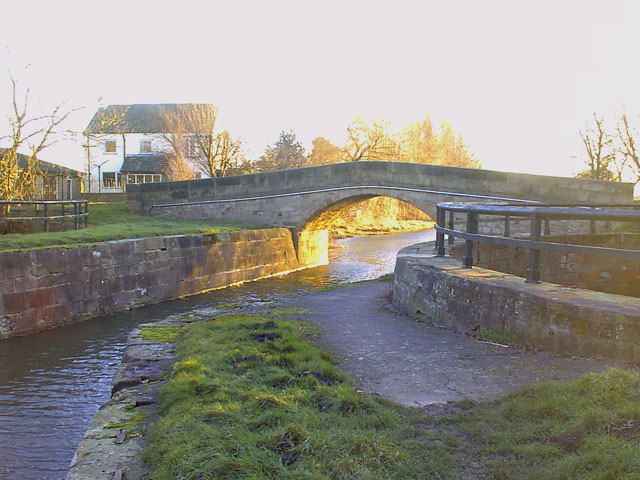
Paper House Bridge over the Selby Canal

Before 1985, the River Ouse between Goole and above York was managed by the Ouse and Foss Navigation Trust, but was later transferred to British Waterways. The Selby Canal was then promoted as part of a through route to York, and by 2006, over 2,000 boats were using Selby Lock each year, more than double the number recorded in 1988. Today the canal is used almost entirely by leisure boats. Part of the towpath has been included in the Selby Horseshoe Walk.

The canal takes boats with a maximum length of 78.5 feet (23.9 m), a beam of 16.5 feet (5.0 m), a draught of 4 feet (1.2 m) and an air draught of 9.7 feet (3.0 m). Although not historically part of the Selby Canal, the former section of the River Aire from Bank Dole Junction through Bank Dole Lock and Beal Lock to the flood lock at West Haddlesey is now normally considered to be part of the canal, giving it a total length of 11.7 miles (18.8 km) and four locks. Because the River Ouse at Selby is tidal, the lock can only be used at certain states of the tide, and a lockkeeper is in attendance when a transit into the river is possible. Operation of the lock is fully mechanised.

== Route ==
From the main Ferrybridge to Goole cut on the Aire and Calder Canal, a short branch leaves the main channel near Knottingley, and a lock drops the level by 7 feet (2.1 m) into the River Aire, which flows in a big loop at this point. The river follows a meandering course to Beal, where a bridge carries Intake Lane over it, and a large weir drops the level by another 8 feet (2.4 m). Beal Lock is to the right of the weir, and is 2.8 miles (4.5 km) from the start of this section. After a further 3.7 miles (6.0 km), the Aire continues straight ahead, and there is a sharp left turn into Haddlesey Flood Lock and the start of the Selby Canal. The river section is marked by high flood banks. Haddlesey Lock is normally open unless there are high volumes of water passing down the Aire.

Shortly after the lock, the canal is crossed by Tankard's Stone Bridge, which dates from the construction of the canal and is grade II listed. It is a humpbacked bridge, built of sandstone ashlar, and is topped by a cast iron balustrade. Just before Paper House Bridge, a drain enters the canal on the west bank. The bridge is a late-eighteenth century single arched humpback bridge, made of millstone grit, and is again grade II listed. There are two semi-circular ponds, one on either side of the channel to the north of the bridge, a feature known as a 'Lund Tunnel' which serves to carry a drain under the canal. The East Coast Main Line crosses next, after which comes Burton Hall Bridge, an accommodation bridge designed by William Jessop, and constructed when the canal was built. It is made of millstone grit, and retains an iron roller on the north-west corner of the arch, to protect the structure from towing ropes.

The A19 road crosses at Burn Bridge, and another drain passes under the canal before the site of a dismantled railway bridge. which used to cross just to the south of the A63 road bridge. Immediately afterwards, another original bridge carries Brayton Lane across the canal. Then the Doncaster to Selby railway line crosses at Brayton Railway Bridge, and the A1041 road at Bawtry Road Bridge. The only swing bridge is situated just before the final lock, and is operated by boaters. A wider section marks the point at which the wharves and dry dock turned along the quayside. Both the lock, which retains some paddle mechanisms from 1828 and the adjacent lock house, which has six bays and a hipped pantile roof, are grade II listed structures.

== Points of interest ==
Point	Coordinates (Links to map resources)	OS Grid Ref	Notes
Selby Lock	53.7828°N 1.0574°W	SE622322	Junction with River Ouse
Brayton Railway Bridge	53.7705°N 1.0717°W	SE612308	Doncaster to Selby Line
East Coast Main Line bridge	53.7524°N 1.1245°W	SE578288	
West Haddlesey Flood Lock	53.7315°N 1.1360°W	SE571264	
Beal Lock	53.7236°N 1.1905°W	SE535255	
Bank Dole Lock	53.7097°N 1.2270°W	SE511239	

== See also ==
- Canals of the United Kingdom
- History of the British canal system

== Bibliography ==
- Cumberlidge, Jane (2009). Inland Waterways of Great Britain (8th Ed.). Imray Laurie Norie and Wilson. ISBN 978-1-84623-010-3.
- Edwards, Lewis A (1985). Inland Waterways of Great Britain (6th Ed). Imray Laurie Norie and Wilson. ISBN 978-0-85288-081-4.
- Hadfield, Charles (1972). The Canals of Yorkshire and North East England (Vol 1). David and Charles. ISBN 978-0-7153-5719-4.
- Hadfield, Charles (1973). The Canals of Yorkshire and North East England (Vol 2). David and Charles. ISBN 978-0-7153-5975-4.
- Nicholson (2006). Nicholson Guides Vol 6: Nottingham, York and the North-East. Harper Collins. ISBN 978-0-00-721114-2.
- Priestley, Joseph (1831). "Historical Account of the Navigable Rivers, Canals, and Railways of Great Britain". Archived from the original on 3 March 2016.
