= River Aire =

River in Yorkshire, England

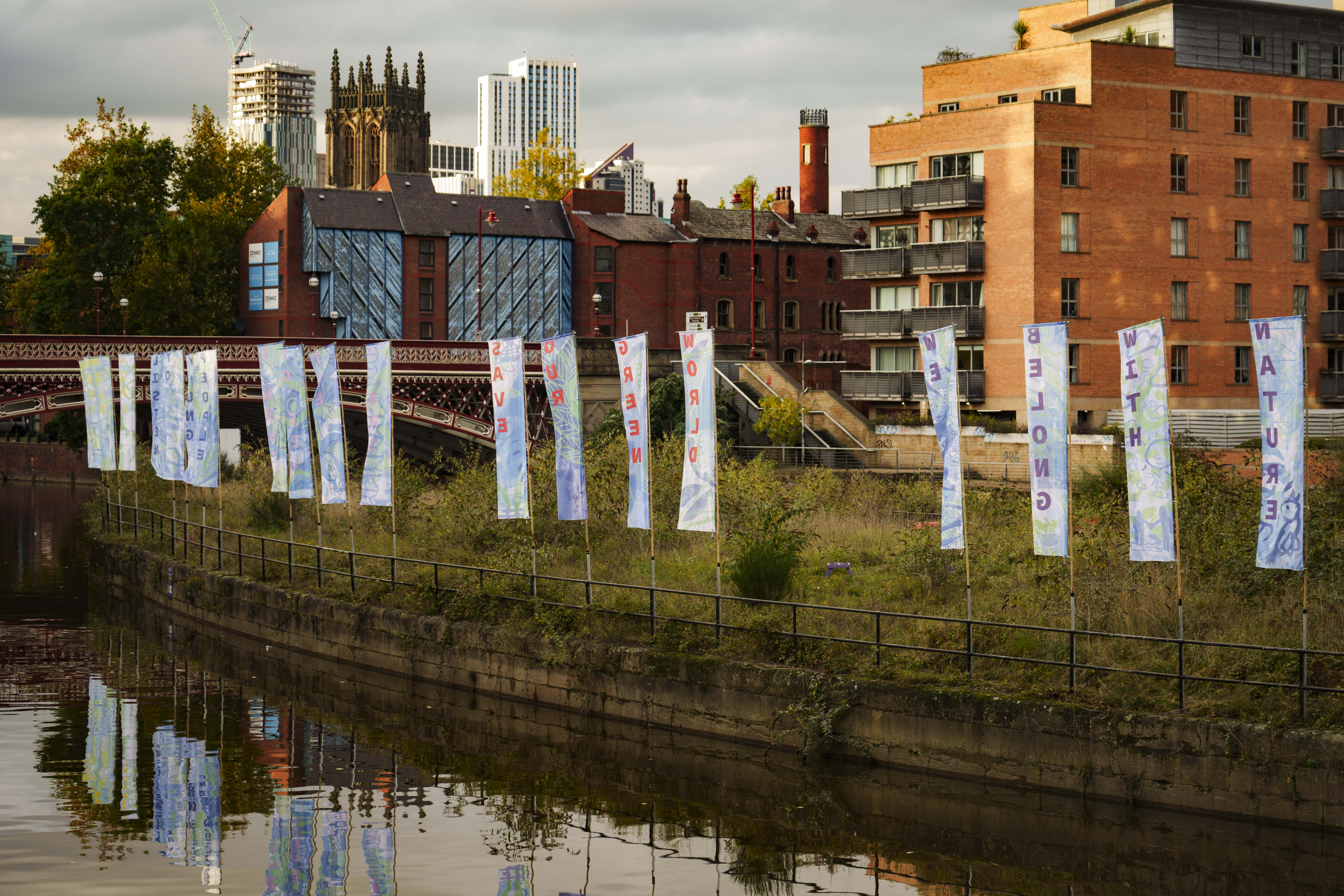
- Art installation of flags on Aire in Leeds

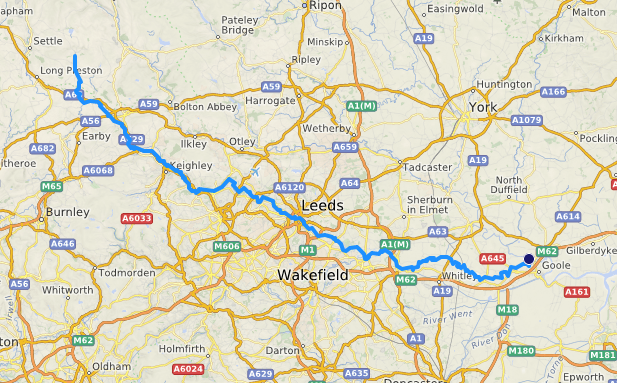
- Course of the Aire

Location
- Country: England
- Counties: North Yorkshire, West Yorkshire, East Riding of Yorkshire
- District: Craven
- City: Leeds

Physical characteristics
- Source
  - location: streams above Malham Tarn, North Yorkshire
  - coordinates: 54.0969°N 2.1907°W
  - elevation: 1,329 ft (405 m)
- Mouth: River Ouse
  - location: Airmyn, East Riding of Yorkshire
  - coordinates: 53.7272°N 0.9067°W
  - elevation: 16 ft (5 m)
- Length: 92 mi (148 km)
- Basin size: 388 sq mi (1,004 km^{2})
- Discharge
  - location: River Ouse
  - average: 1,261 cu ft/s (35.72 m^{3}/s)

Basin features
- Tributaries
  - left: Gordale Beck, Eshton Beck, Eller Beck, Silsden Beck
  - right: Ickornshaw Beck Otterburn Beck, Broughton Beck, Eastburn Beck, River Worth, Harden Beck, Bradford Beck, River Calder

The River Aire is a major river in Yorkshire, England, 92 miles (148 km) in length. Part of the river below Leeds is canalised, and is known as the Aire and Calder Navigation.

The Handbook for Leeds and Airedale (1890) notes that the distance from Malham to Howden is 58 miles (93 km) direct, but the river's meanderings extend that to 90 miles (140 km). Between Malham Tarn and Airmyn, the river drops 1,300 feet (400 m).

== Course ==
The Aire starts at Malham Tarn and becomes a subterranean stream at 'Water Sinks' about one mile (1.6 km) before the top of Malham Cove, it then flows underground to Aire Head, just below Malham, in North Yorkshire, and then flows through Gargrave and Skipton. After Cononley, the river enters West Yorkshire where it passes through the former industrial areas of Keighley, Bingley, Saltaire and Shipley. It then passes through Leeds and on to Swillington and Woodlesford. At Castleford is the confluence of the Aire and Calder; just downstream of the confluence was the ford where the ancient British road, used by the Romans, crossed on its way north to York. The river re-enters North Yorkshire near Knottingley and in its lower reaches forms part of the boundary between North Yorkshire and the East Riding of Yorkshire.

Tests have been conducted to authenticate the actual source of the Aire. The tarn at Malham was dammed and allowed to flood. Observers noted that whilst water surged at Aire Head, it also surged at the bottom of Malham Cove. A significant difference of 30 minutes was noted between the surges with Malham Cove being slower to react to the floodwater.

The section between Malham Tarn and the confluence of the becks at Aire Head is known as Malhamdale. Thereafter the valley is known as Airedale and encompasses Bradford, (even though the river bypasses the city) and by the time it reaches Leeds, the term Airedale is rarely applied.

The River Aire empties into the River Ouse at Airmyn, 'myn' being an old English word for 'river mouth'.

== Settlements ==
From source

- Malham
- Hanlith
- Airton
- Bell Busk
- Gargrave
- Skipton
- Low Bradley
- Cononley
- Kildwick
- Silsden
- Steeton
- Utley
- Keighley
- Riddlesden
- Crossflatts
- Bingley
- Saltaire
- Shipley
- Charlestown
- Esholt
- Guiseley
- Apperley Bridge
- Horsforth
- Kirkstall
- Leeds city centre
- Holbeck
- Knowsthorpe
- Allerton Bywater
- Castleford
- Brotherton
- Ferrybridge
- Knottingley
- Beal
- West Haddlesey
- Chapel Haddlesey
- Temple Hirst
- Hensall
- Gowdall
- Snaith
- Rawcliffe
- Newland
- Airmyn

(Joins River Ouse)

== Toponymy ==
The name of the Aire is first attested as Yr in a charter from 959 AD (as edited in Gray's Cartularium Saxonicum). The river is named as darcy and ðarcy (with the ancient eth) in a thirteenth-century transcription of a charter of 963. It is Eyr’ in 1135 in The Coucher Book of Selby and other sources up to 1298. Eir is given in 1175–7 in one of the Dodsworth Manuscripts in Farrer's Early Yorkshire Charters. A range of other spellings are attested, among them Air from c. 1160 to 1577 and John Cossins' 1775 Plan of the Town of Leedes, and Air’ from the thirteenth century to the fourteenth.

The etymology of the name is obscure. Two Celtic etymologies have been proposed. In 1857 it was suggested that Aire may come from Common Brittonic *Isarā ('the strong one'), in which case Aire originally meant 'strong river'. An alternative Celtic etymology suggests that the word is related to Welsh aer ('slaughter').

However, the name could also come from Old Norse eyjar ('islands'), which might in turn have been inspired by an earlier Old English name ēg ('island').

== History ==
Leeds Bridge by John Atkinson Grimshaw, 1880

The deposit of silt by two tributaries close together, the Meanwood Beck from the north and the Hol Beck from the south, created a crossing place and a settlement that became the town of Leeds. The Romans forded the Aire by a paved way at Castleford on the road connecting Doncaster with York, which went north through the town near to the church. At this time, the River Don emptied into the Aire at Snaith, but the Dutch engineer, Cornelius Vermuyden, changed the course of the Don in the 1630s so that it flows into the Ouse after its confluence with the Aire.

During the Great Frost of 1683–84 the river froze solid for a month in Leeds allowing a fair with an ox-roast and sports to take place, as described by Ralph Thoresby.

An Act of Parliament was passed in 1699 to make the river downstream of Leeds navigable (the Aire and Calder Navigation) and a second act extended the navigable river upstream to Bingley. The second act formed the basis of the Leeds and Liverpool Canal.

Between the mid 19th century and the late 20th, the River Aire was devoid of fish life downstream of Shipley because of pollution. Efforts have been made to return the river to a good wildlife status and fish and other wildlife exist all along the course of the river.

== Power stations ==
There are three thermal power stations alongside the River Aire east of Castleford: Ferrybridge C, Eggborough and Drax. Drax takes its cooling water from the Ouse, but both Ferrybridge and Eggborough drew their water from the Aire. Both of the latter plants stopped generating in 2016, with Eggborough being a stand-by for capacity problems until March 2017.

A hydroelectric power station was installed on Brotherton Weir at Knottingley in November 2017. This £7.5 million project was expected to deliver 500 kilowatts and be operational for 100 years.

== Ecology ==
Because the Aire flows through the former industrial landscape of West Yorkshire, it was heavily polluted. In 2007, Yorkshire Water carried out improvements to Esholt Sewage Works at a cost of £110 million under the EU's Fresh Water Fish Directive. Whilst Trout are prevalent above Keighley, the river is host to others such as Chub, Dace, Barbel & Grayling, whilst Sea Trout have been noted as far upriver as Shipley. Work is also being undertaken to make some weirs easier for fish to negotiate. Improvements have allowed Eurasian otters and European water voles to return to the river as the water and food quality is far superior to that when the river was polluted. In the upper reaches of the river around Bell Busk and Malham, white-clawed crayfish are present in the tributaries.

A joint project between the Environment Agency and The Aire Rivers Trust will instal four fish passes on the last four high weirs on the river, with the intent of allowing salmon to return to Skipton for the first time since the Industrial Revolution. The project will also benefit eels, lamprey and other coarse fish. The project is expected to be complete by early 2021.

Castleford Wastewater Treatment Works has had £16 million of investment between 2013 and 2015. The improvements to this plant, which discharges water directly into the Aire, has improved water quality downstream.

Rodley Nature Reserve, Kirkstall Valley Nature Reserve, St Aidans and Fairburn Ings RSPB reserve all lie alongside the Aire.

== Navigation ==
The Aire is navigable upstream to Leeds and downstream has a navigable section into the Aire & Calder Navigation, with navigable access to other canals and waterways. Crown Point in Leeds is listed as the furthest west that can be reached by boat, though the limit is a headroom of 11 feet 11 inches (3.62 m). The weir that straddles Crown Point is a listed structure that was constructed in medieval times and first documented in 1636.

Canoeing and rowing are popular sports on the river with two clubs (the Bradford and Bingley Canoe Club and the Bradford Amateur Rowing Club) having landings on the river. Canoeing can be carried out on most parts of the river, with the two clubs having navigable sections protected by weirs next to their landings.

== Leeds flood alleviation scheme ==
In October 2017 at Crown Point near Leeds city centre and Knostrop two movable weirs, the first in the UK, were installed in the first phase of a two phase plan to reduce floods. Reducing the height of the weir, by deflating a 'bladder' has the potential to reduce flood levels by up to one metre upstream. The Knostrop weir was operated during the 2019 England floods. A 600m stretch of land, Knostrop Cut island, was removed allowing the river and canal to merge creating additional flood water capacity. Adrian Gill, area flood risk manager at the Environment Agency said, "The scheme has reduced the risk of flooding to 3,000 homes, 500 business and 300 acres of development land south-east of Leeds Train Station to Woodlesford".

Phase two will use natural flood management techniques to help slow the flow, helping to protect a further 1,048 homes and 474 businesses. Work on phase two, designed to provide a one-in-100 year level of protection, will take place on an 8 km stretch upstream of Leeds station starting in late 2019. A pilot scheme, costing £500,000 is underway (in November 2019). If additional funding can be secured the flood plain near Calverley will be used for water storage providing a one-in-200 year level of protection.

== Gallery ==
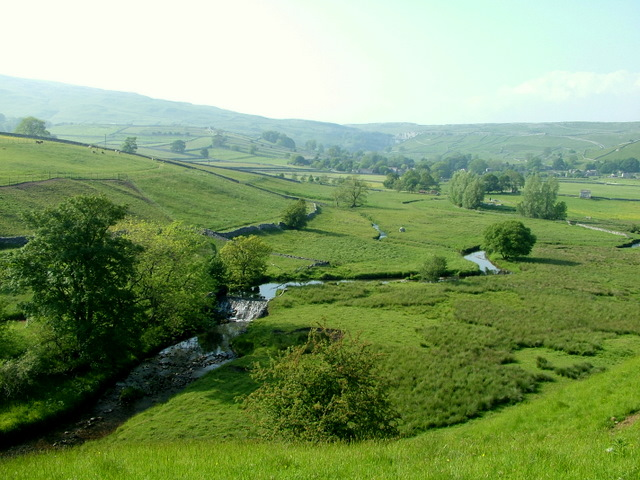
South of Malham

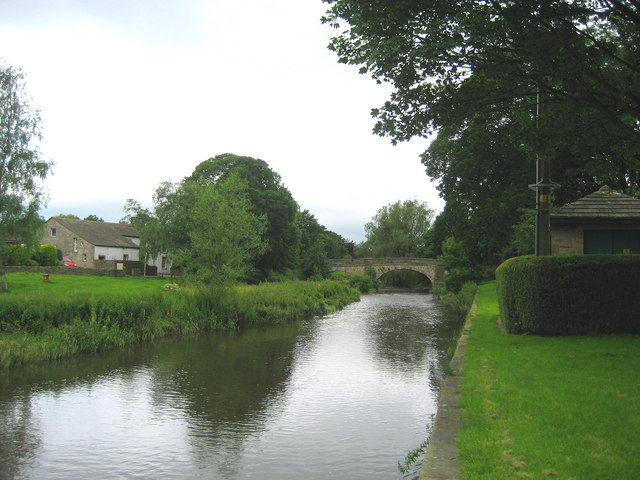

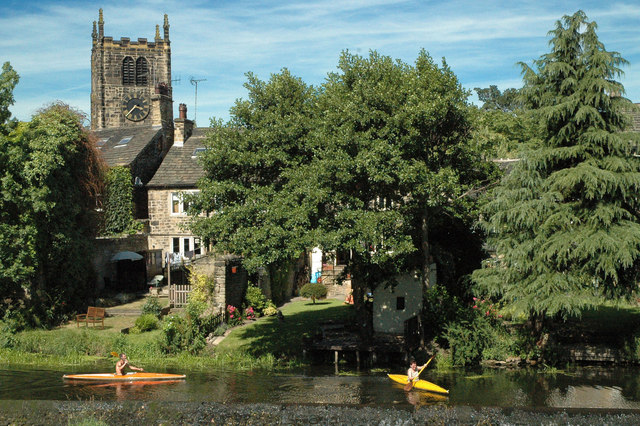
Bingley

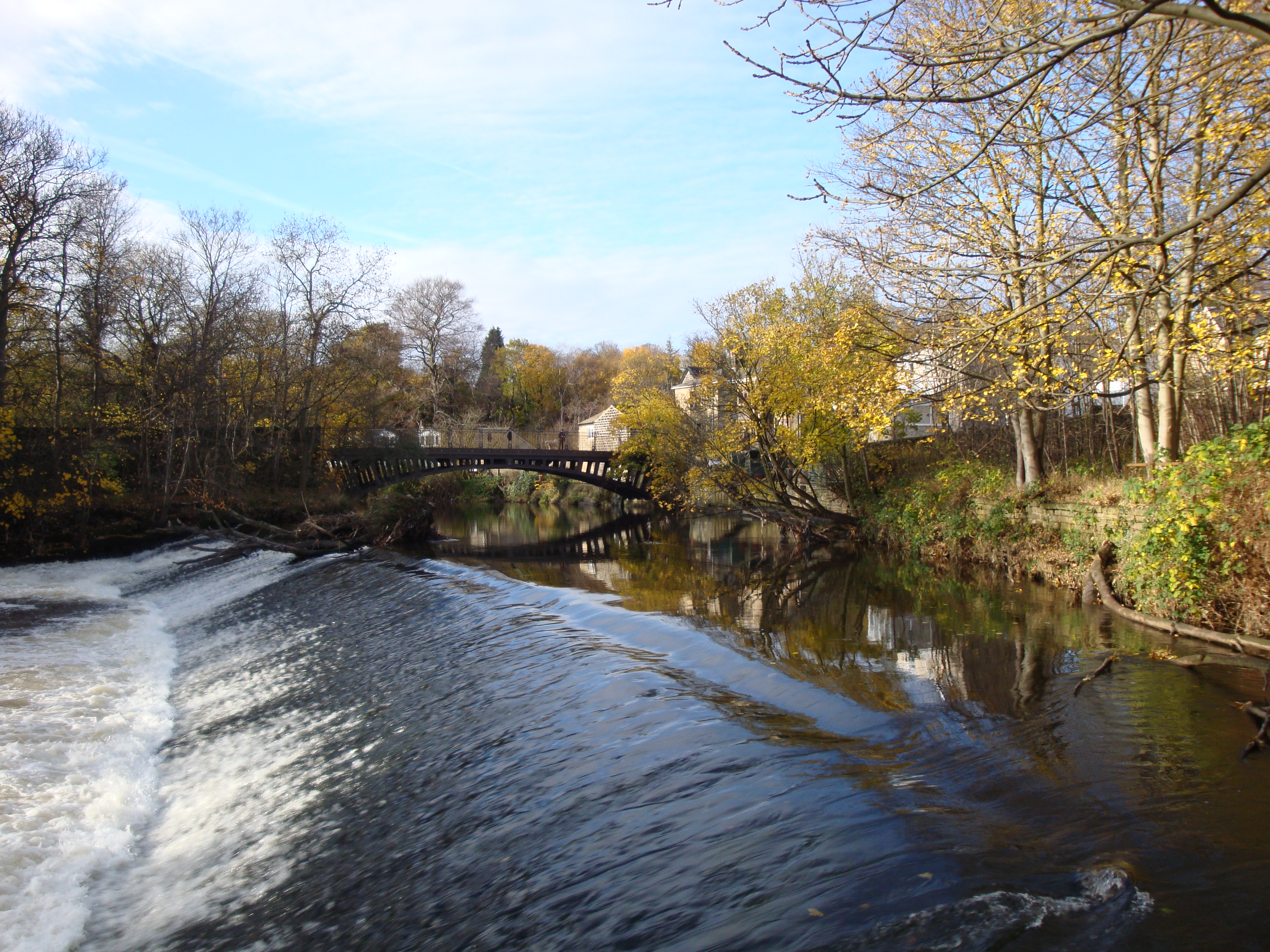
Pollard Bridge, Newlay near Leeds

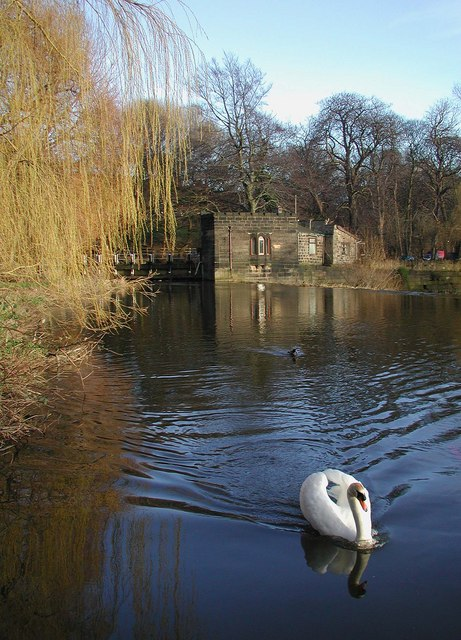
Kirkstall Abbey

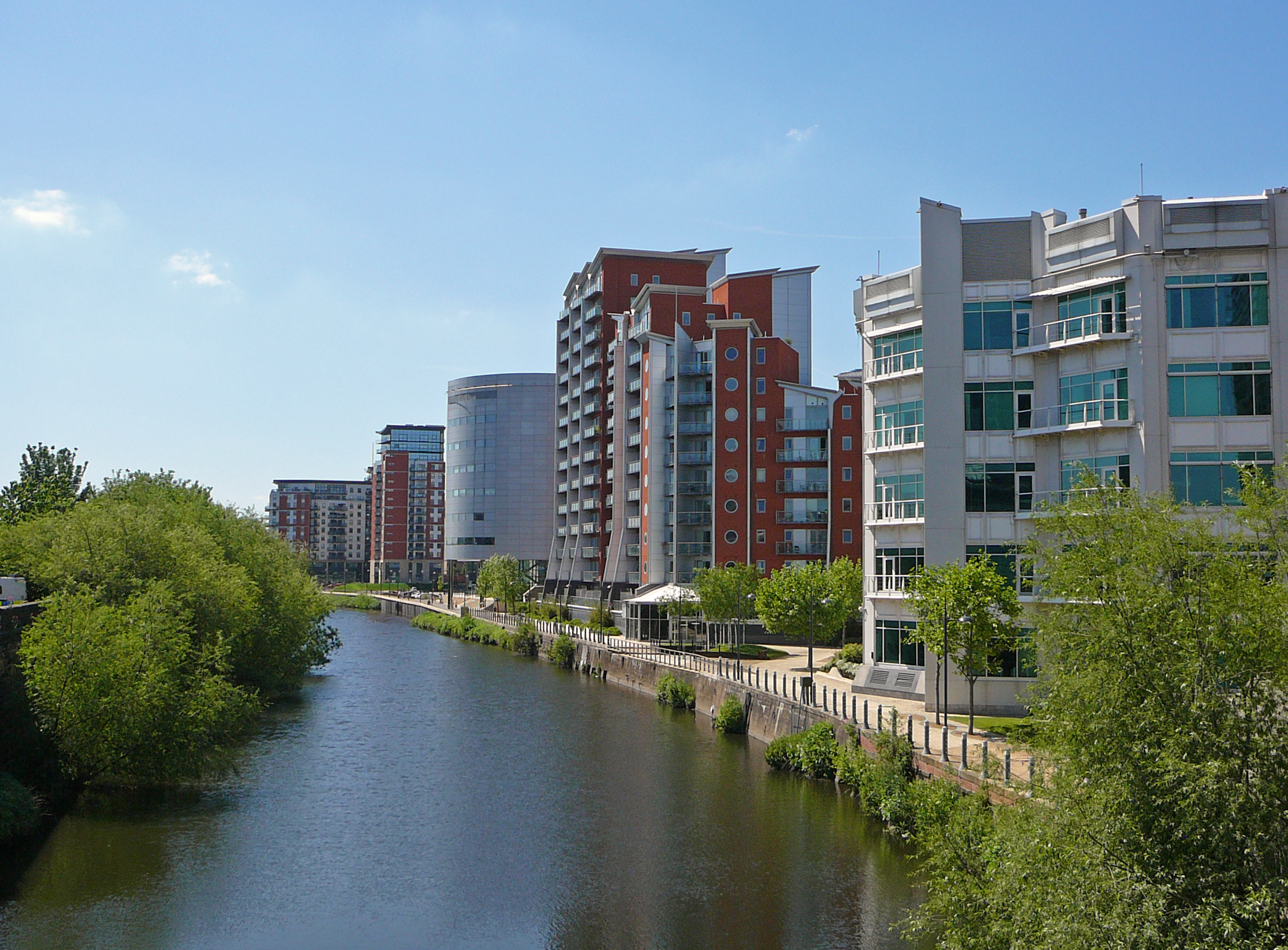
River Aire at Leeds

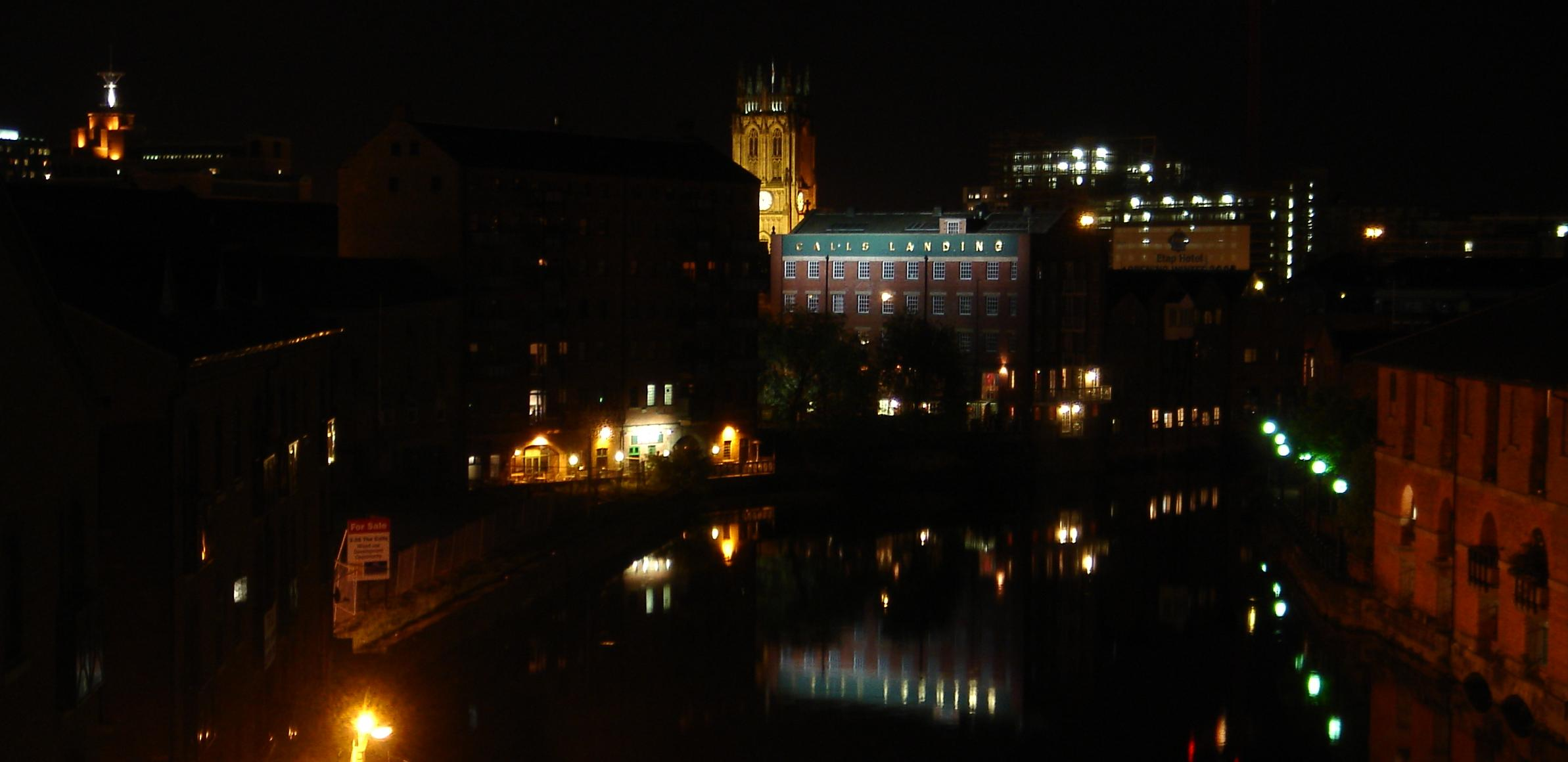
Leeds city centre

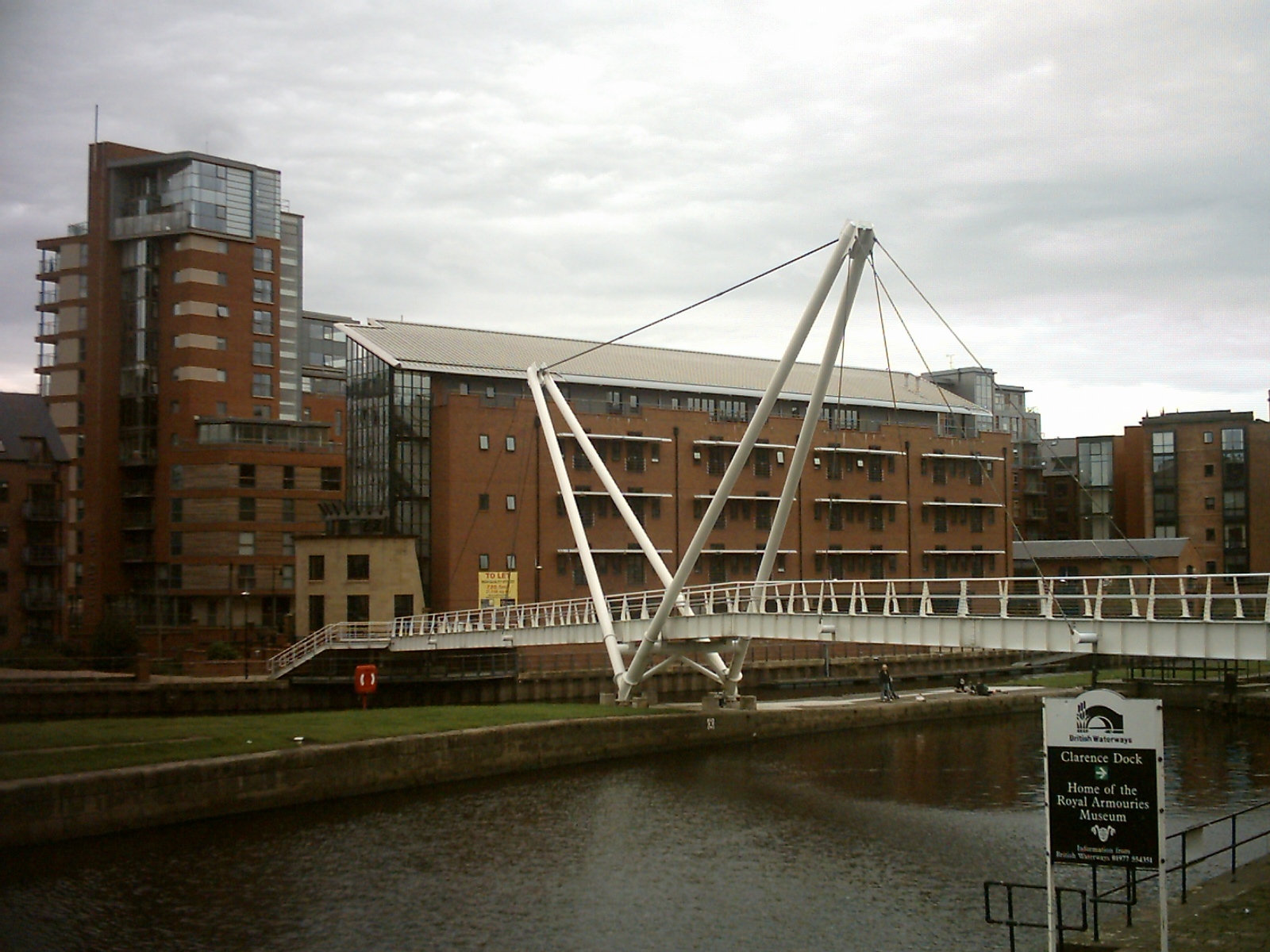
Clarence Dock, Leeds

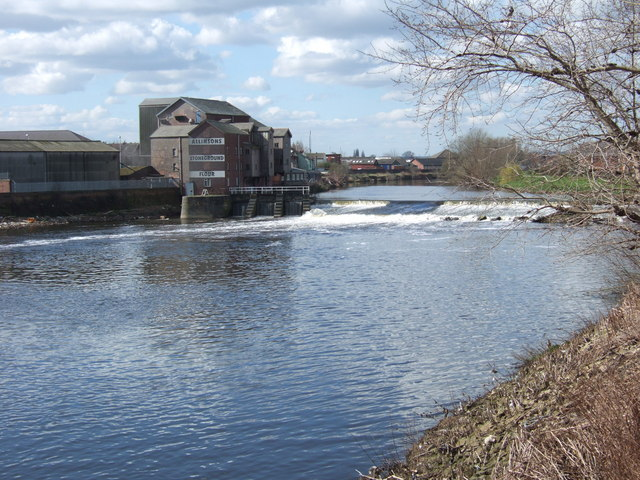
Castleford

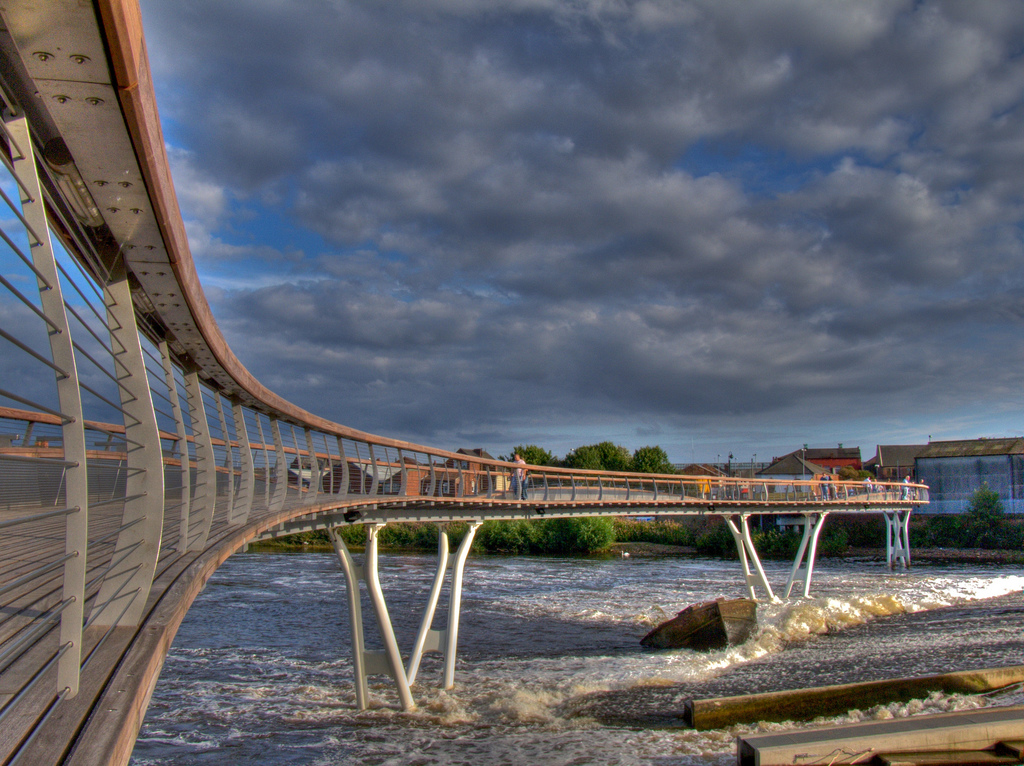
The 2008 bridge over the River Aire at Castleford

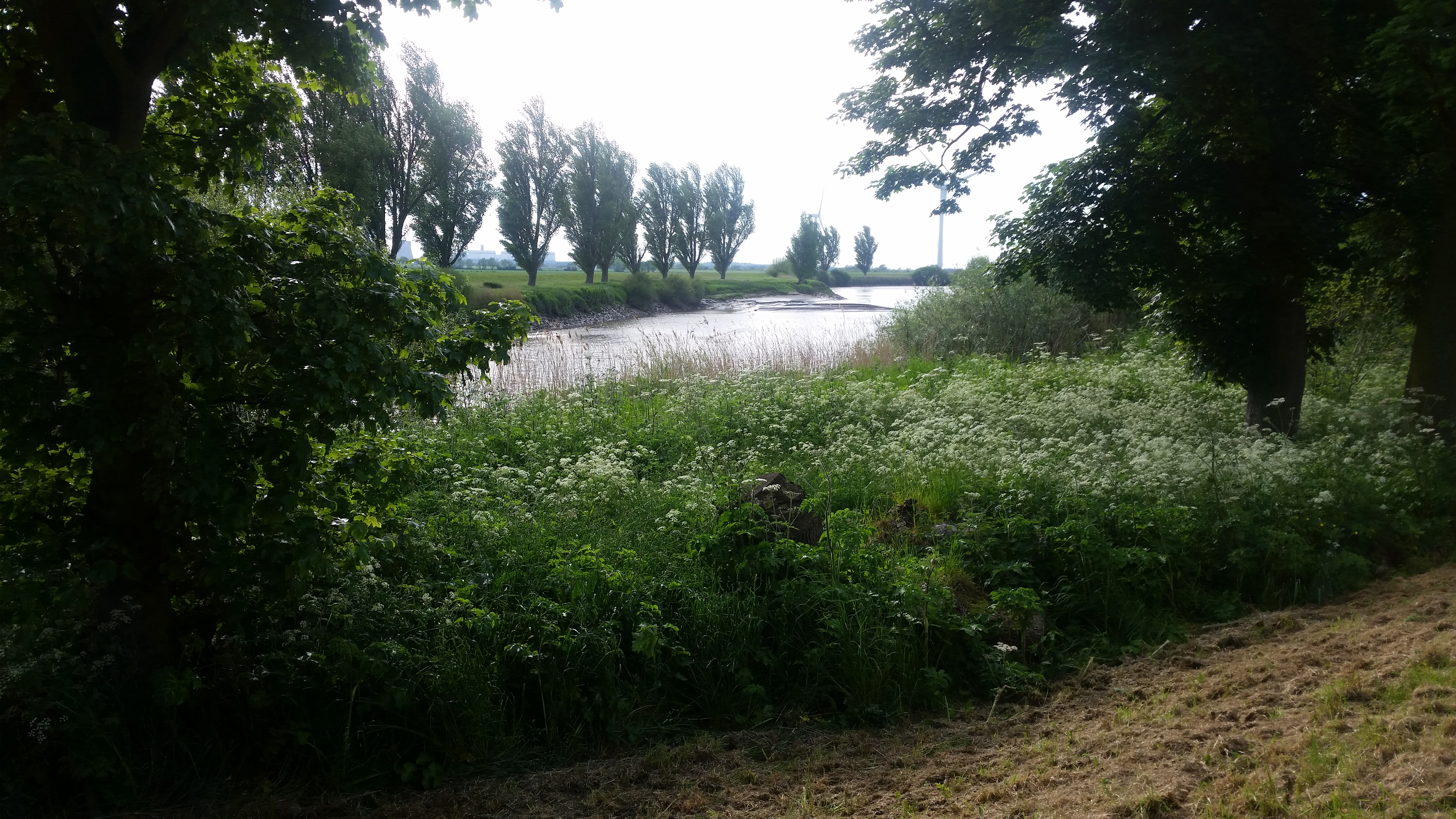
The River Aire as it approaches the River Ouse at Airmyn

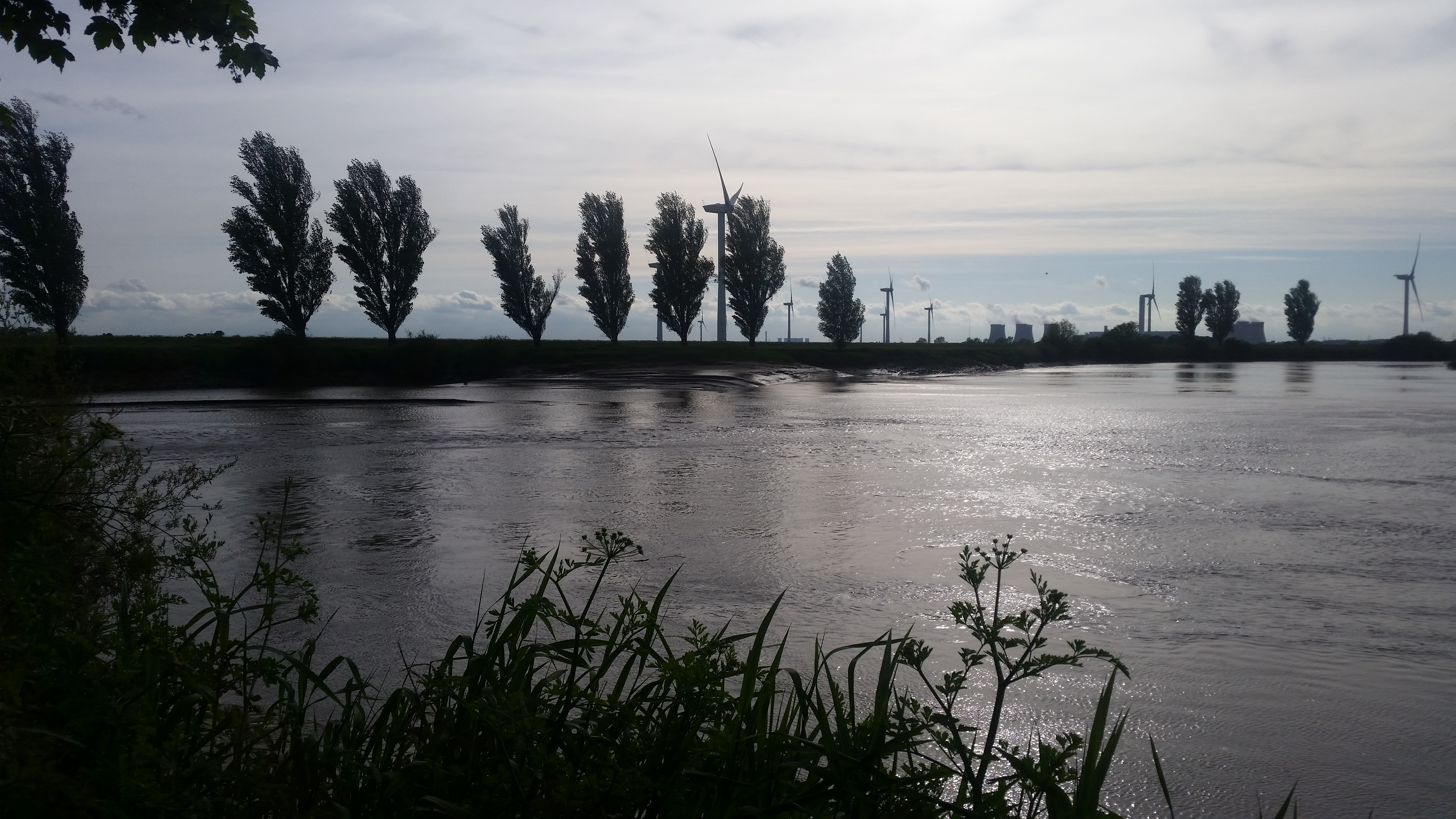
The confluence of the River Aire and River Ouse. The Aire emerges from the left.

== See also ==
- List of crossings of the River Aire
- Rivers of the United Kingdom
