= Selby District =

Former local government district in England

Coordinates: 53.777°N 1.079°W

- Non-metropolitan district
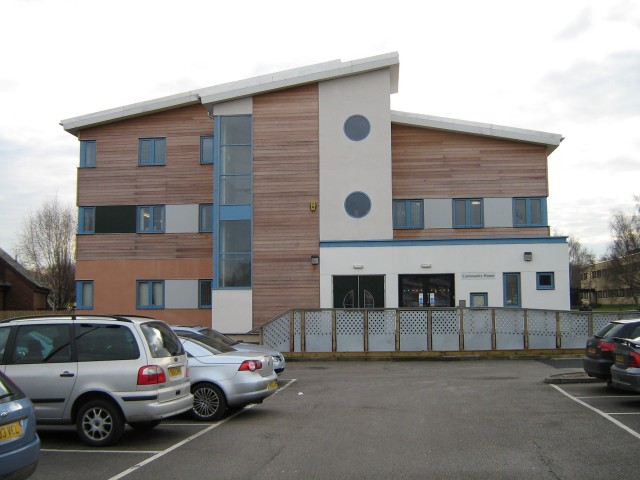
- Selby District Community House

- Coat of Arms

- Shown within North Yorkshire
- Sovereign state: United Kingdom
- Constituent country: England
- Region: Yorkshire and the Humber
- Shire county: North Yorkshire
- Admin. HQ: Selby

Government
  - Type: Selby District Council
  - Leadership: Leader and Executive
  - Executive

Area
  - Total: 231.4 sq mi (599.3 km^{2})

Population (2021)
  - Total: 92,401
  - Density: 399.3/sq mi (154.2/km^{2})
- Time zone: UTC+0 (Greenwich Mean Time)
  - Summer (DST): UTC+1 (British Summer Time)
- ONS code: 36UH (ONS); E07000169 (GSS)
- Ethnicity: 92.3% White
- Website: selby.gov.uk

Selby District was a local government district of North Yorkshire, England, from 1974 to 2023. Its council was based in the town of Selby. The district had a population of 83,449 at the 2011 Census. The southernmost district of North Yorkshire, it bordered the City of York unitary authority, the Borough of Harrogate in North Yorkshire, the City of Leeds and City of Wakefield districts in West Yorkshire, the City of Doncaster in South Yorkshire, and the ceremonial county of the East Riding of Yorkshire.

== History ==
The district was formed on 1 April 1974 by the merger of Selby Urban District, Selby Rural District and parts of Derwent Rural District, Hemsworth Rural District, Osgoldcross Rural District and Tadcaster Rural District. Of them, Derwent Rural District was in the historic East Riding of Yorkshire, while the rest were in the West Riding of Yorkshire.

On 1 April 1996, the parishes of Acaster Malbis, Askham Bryan, Askham Richard, Bishopthorpe, Copmanthorpe, Deighton, Dunnington, Elvington, Fulford, Heslington, Kexby, Naburn and Wheldrake were all transferred from the district to form part of the new City of York unitary authority area. According to the 2001 census, those parishes had a population of 22,873.

== Towns and villages ==
Settlements in the district of Selby included:

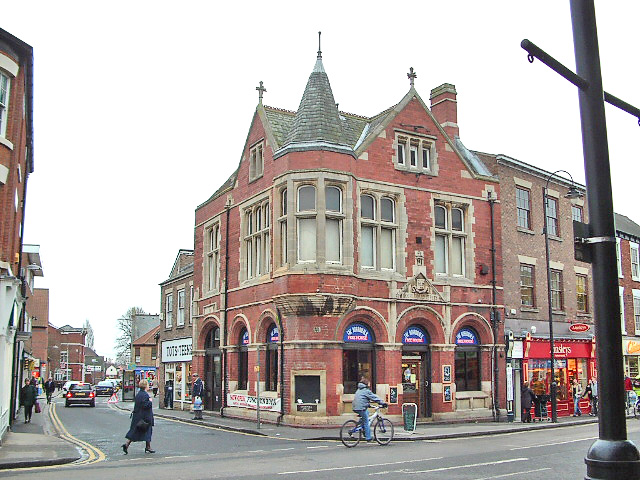
Selby

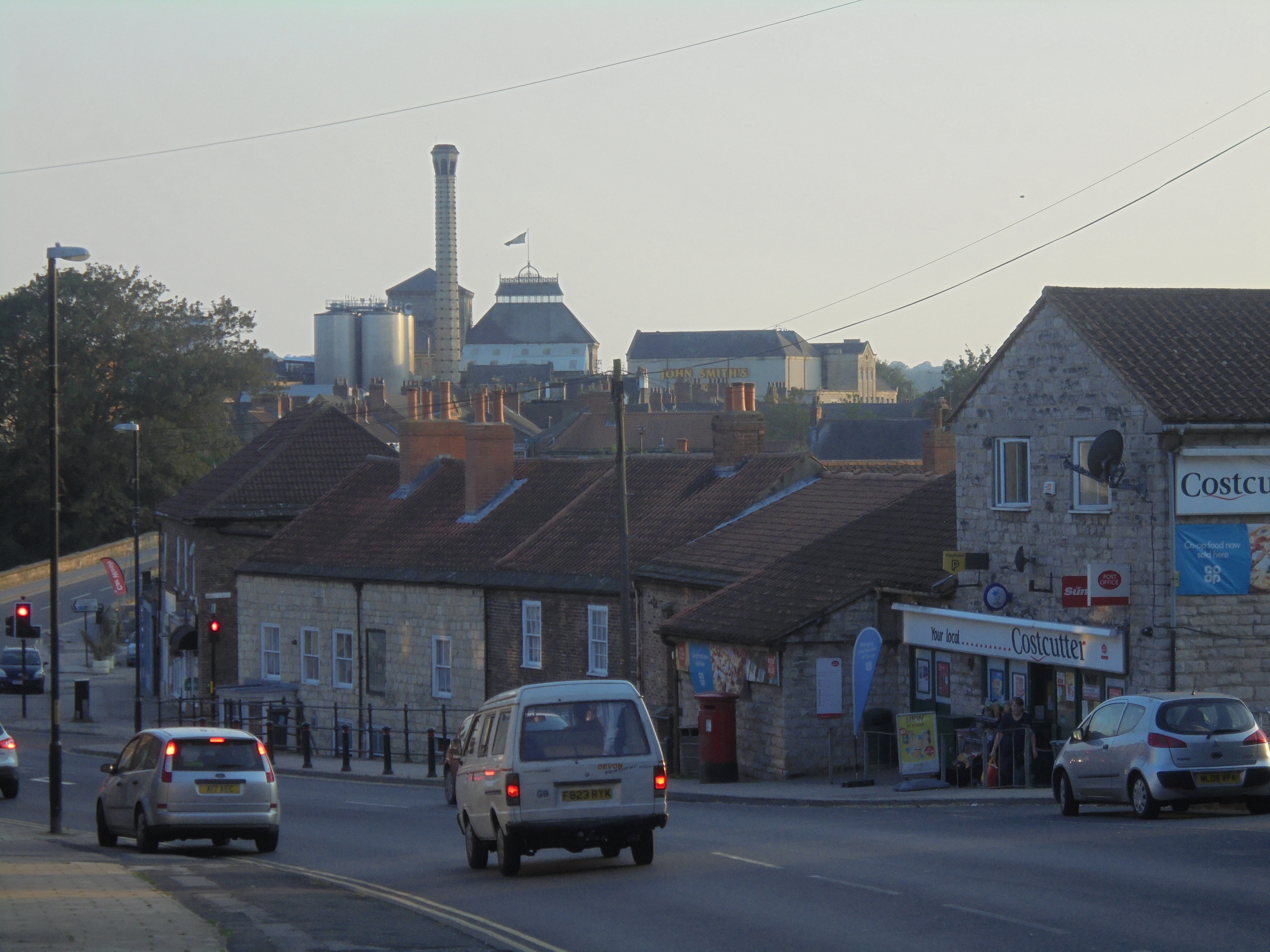
Tadcaster

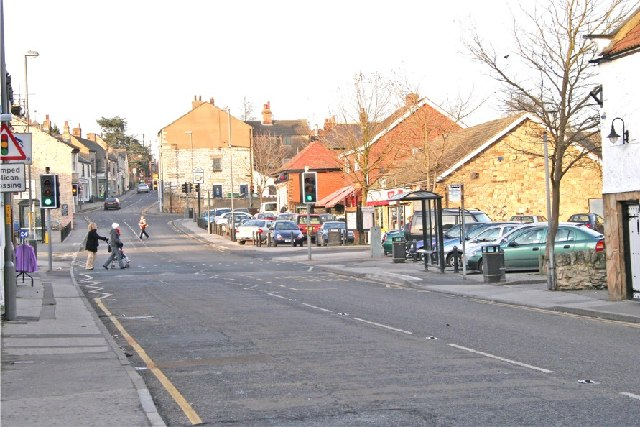
Sherburn in Elmet

Balne, Barlby, Barlow, Biggin, Bilbrough, Bolton Percy, Burn, Burton Salmon, Brayton, Brotherton
Camblesforth, Carlton, Cawood, Church Fenton, Cliffe, Chapel Haddlesey, Cridling Stubbs
Drax
Eggborough, Escrick
Fairburn
Gateforth
Hambleton, Hemingbrough, Hensall, Hillam, Hirst Courtney
Kelfield, Kellington, Kirk Smeaton
Long Drax, Lumby
Monk Fryston
Newthorpe, North Duffield
Osgodby
Riccall
Selby, Sherburn in Elmet, Skipwith, Stutton, South Milford, Stillingfleet
Tadcaster, Temple Hirst, Thorganby, Thorpe Willoughby, Towton
Ulleskelf
Walden Stubbs, West Haddlesey, Whitley, Wistow, Womersley

== Council ==
In the final elections to the council in 2019, the Conservative Party held a majority on the council, with Labour in opposition.

=== Abolition ===
In July 2021 the Ministry of Housing, Communities and Local Government announced that in April 2023, the non-metropolitan county would be reorganised into a unitary authority. Selby District Council was abolished and its functions were transferred to a new single authority for the non-metropolitan county of North Yorkshire.

== See also ==
- Selby and District DIAL
