= Temple Hirst =

Village and civil parish in North Yorkshire, England

Coordinates: 53.718905°N 1.092118°W

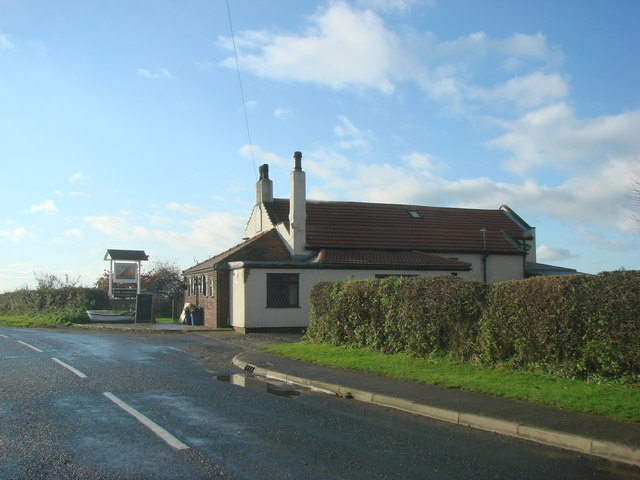
- The Sloop Inn, Temple Hirst

- Location within North Yorkshire
- Population: 117 (2011 census)
- OS grid reference: SE600251
- Unitary authority: North Yorkshire
- Ceremonial county: North Yorkshire
- Region: Yorkshire and the Humber
- Country: England
- Sovereign state: United Kingdom
- Post town: SELBY
- Postcode district: YO8
- Police: North Yorkshire
- Fire: North Yorkshire
- Ambulance: Yorkshire

Temple Hirst is a village and civil parish in the county of North Yorkshire, England. The village is located on the north bank of the River Aire. In the 2011 census the population was 117.

It was formerly in the wapentake of Barkston Ash in the West Riding of Yorkshire. From 1974 to 2023 it was part of the Selby District. It is now administered by the unitary North Yorkshire Council.

== Naming ==
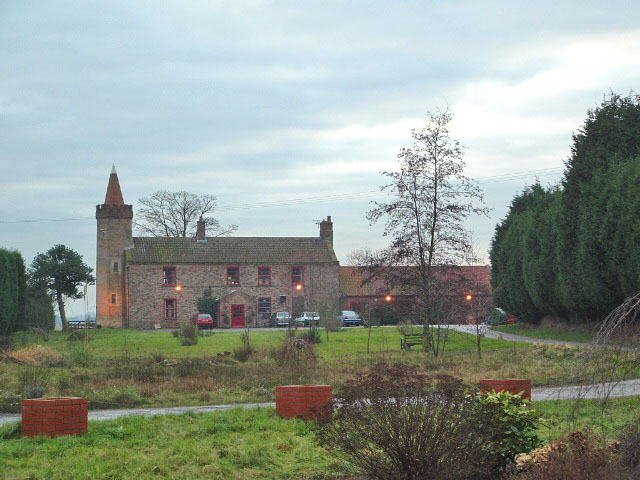
Temple Manor

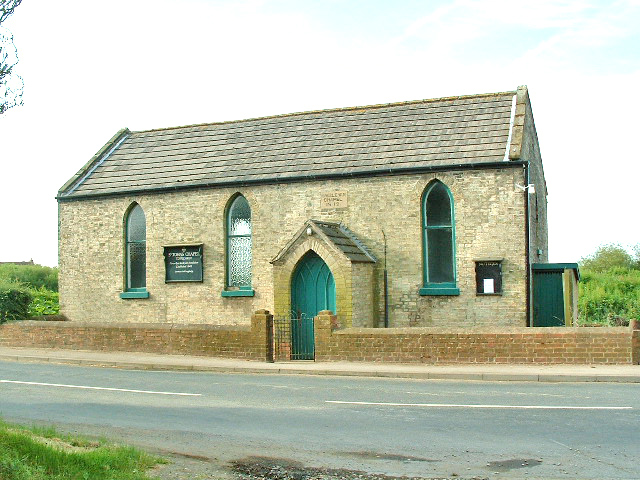
St John's Chapel

'Temple' marks a former estate of the Knights Templar, and is found in other parts of the country, such as Cressing Temple, Essex, Temple Balsall, Warwickshire, Temple Bruer, Lincolnshire, Templecombe, Somerset, Temple Cowley, Oxfordshire, Temple Dinsley, Hertfordshire, Temple Ewell, Kent, Temple Guiting, Gloucestershire, and Temple Newsam, Yorkshire.

'Hirst' is from the Old English for copse or wooded hill, suggesting a patch of slightly higher ground in this low-lying landscape.

== History ==
Temple Hirst was held by the Knights Templar from around 1152, who established Temple Hirst Preceptory.

In 1871, North Eastern Railway established a railway station at Temple Hirst as part of the East Coast Main Line. It closed to passengers in 1961.

In 2001, the population of the parish was 133, which had fallen at the 2011 Census to 117. In 2015, North Yorkshire County Council estimated that the population was 120.

=== Notable buildings ===
Temple Manor is a 17th-century house which includes a late 15th- or early 16th-century tower from the house of the Darcy family, and a stone doorway from Temple Hirst Preceptory. It was extensively renovated and altered around 1980 to become a public house. It is now Temple Manor Care Home.

St John's Chapel is a former Wesleyan Methodist Chapel which was built in 1842. From 1976 to 2018 the chapel was used by the Church of England.

The Sloop Inn is a public house. The name reflects the type of boat – the sloop – which used to travel along the river.
