= Osgoldcross Rural District =

Former local government area in the UK

Coordinates: 53.744°N 1.310°W

Osgoldcross
- History
  - Created: 1938
  - Abolished: 1974
  - Succeeded by: Selby District; City of Wakefield
- Status: Rural district
  - HQ: Pontefract

Osgoldcross Rural District was a rural district in the West Riding of Yorkshire, England. It was created in 1938 from 19 remaining parishes of the disbanded Pontefract Rural District, after three-quarters of its population (but only a small fraction of the area) had been transferred to surrounding authorities, namely Castleford (which took 14,145 of the 23,981 in the district in 1931), Knottingley, and Pontefract.

It was named after the Wapentake of Osgoldcross and administered from Pontefract.

Since 1 April 1974, it has formed part of the District of Selby and the City of Wakefield.

At the time of its dissolution it consisted of the following 19 civil parishes.

- Balne
- Beal
- Birkin
- Brotherton
- Burton Salmon
- Byram cum Sutton
- Cridling Stubbs
- Darrington
- East Hardwick
- Eggborough
- Fairburn
- Heck
- Hensall
- Hillam
- Kellington
- Monk Fryston
- Stapleton
- Whitley
- Womersley

Darrington and East Hardwick went to the City of Wakefield in West Yorkshire. The other 17 parishes went to Selby District in North Yorkshire, which itself was abolished in 2023.

== See also ==
- Osgoldcross (UK Parliament constituency)
