= Ferry Bridge =

Ferry Bridge is the name of:

- Ferry Bridge, Brotherton in Yorkshire, England
- Ferry Bridge, Burton in Staffordshire, England
- Ferry Bridge, Dorset in England

== See also ==
- Ferrybridge
