= Osgoldcross =

Osgoldcross may refer to:

- Osgoldcross (UK Parliament constituency)
- Osgoldcross Wapentake
- Osgoldcross Rural District
