= St Edward's Church, Brotherton =

Church in Brotherton, North Yorkshire, England

Coordinates: 53°43′33″N 1°16′15″W

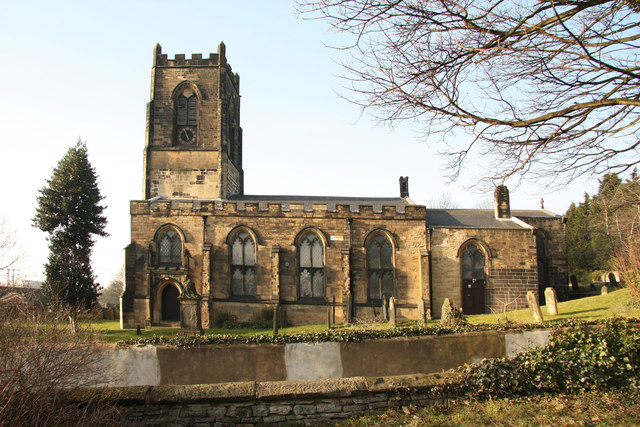
The church, in 2013

St Edward's Church is the parish church of Brotherton, a village in North Yorkshire, in England.

The first church on the site was constructed in about 1300, but it was rebuilt in 1842 and 1843, at a cost of £3,250. Of this, £2,000 was donated by the Ramsden family, to whom there are several memorials within the church. The church was Grade II listed in 1967. By this time, the church was overshadowed by the cooling towers of one of the Ferrybridge power stations, a view illustrated in one of Eric de Maré's most famous photographs. The cooling towers were later demolished.

The church is built of millstone grit with a Welsh slate roof, and is in Gothic Revival style. It consists of a nave, north and south aisles, a chancel with a north aisle and a south vestry, and a west tower. The tower has two stages, diagonal buttresses rising to pinnacles, two-light bell openings with hood moulds, and an embattled parapet. The aisles also have embattled parapets, and the windows are in Perpendicular style with hood moulds. Inside, the nave has two galleries, and there are assorted wall monuments, the earliest dating from 1686. The east window of the north aisle has stained glass manufactured by William Holland in 1858.

== See also ==
- Listed buildings in Brotherton
