= Listed buildings in Brotherton =

Brotherton is a civil parish in the county of North Yorkshire, England. It contains four listed buildings that are recorded in the National Heritage List for England. Of these, one is listed at Grade I, the highest of the three grades, and the others are at Grade II, the lowest grade. The parish contains the villages of Brotherton and Byram, and the surrounding area. The listed buildings consist of a house, a bridge, a church and a milestone.

== Key ==
Grade	Criteria
I	Buildings of exceptional interest, sometimes considered to be internationally important
II	Buildings of national importance and special interest

== Buildings ==
Name and location	Photograph	Date	Notes	Grade
The Manor House; 53.72748°N 1.27230°W	—	1664–66	Originally the wing of a larger house, later demolished, it was extended in the 18th century. The house is in magnesian limestone, with brick dressings, quoins, and a stone slate roof with gable copings and kneelers. There are two storeys, six bays, a rounded corner in the ground floor on the right, and a rear outshut. On the front is a porch, and two doorways with fanlights, and the windows are sashes, some with quoined surrounds, and others with brick surrounds. In the left gable end is a blocked opening containing a carved figure.	II
Ferry Bridge; 53.71589°N 1.26943°W		1797	The bridge, which was designed by John Carr, carries the former Great North Road over the River Aire. It is in millstone grit, and consists of eight round-headed arches, three over the river, one over the land on the Brotherton side, and four over the land on the Ferrybridge side. The arches over the river have volute keystones and hood moulds, canted cutwaters rising to pedestrian refuges, a dentilled cornice, and a parapet with a vase balustrade. Flanking these arches are piers containing a niche with a quoined surround. The outer arches have a band, two have plain keystones and the others have rusticated surrounds. The parapet has splayed ends and rounded caps on three ends.	I
St Edward's Church; 53.72573°N 1.27088°W		1842	The church is in millstone grit with a Welsh slate roof, and is in Gothic Revival style. It consists of a nave, north and south aisles, a chancel with a north aisle and a south vestry, and a west tower. The tower has two stages, diagonal buttresses rising to pinnacles, two-light bell openings with hood moulds, and an embattled parapet. The aisles also have embattled parapets, and the windows are in Perpendicular style with hood moulds.	II
Milestone; 53.72494°N 1.26426°W		19th century	The milestone on the east side of the Old Great North Road (A162 road), is in stone with a cast iron front, and has a triangular plan and a semicircular top. The top is inscribed "TADCASTER & DONCASTER ROAD" and "BROTHERTON", on the left side are the distances to Doncaster, Ferrybridge and Pontefract, and on the right side to Boroughbridge, York and Tadcaster.	II
