= Heck, North Yorkshire =

Civil parish in North Yorkshire, England

Coordinates: 53°41′N 1°07′W

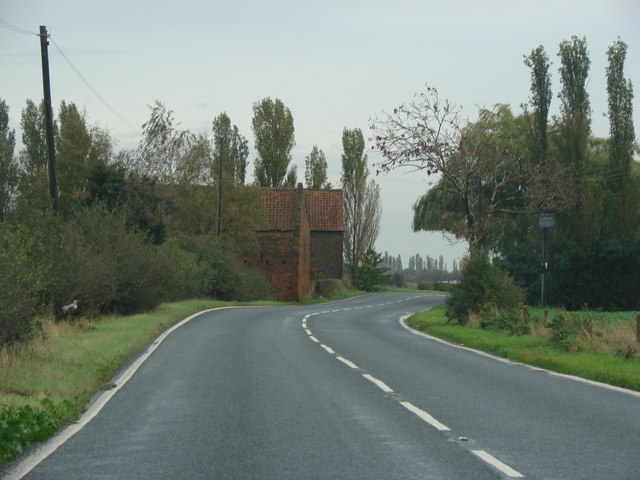
Farm Buildings on either side of the A645, near Little Heck

Heck is a civil parish in the English county of North Yorkshire. The population of this civil parish at the census 2011 was 201, a slight drop on the 2001 census figure of 209.

The main settlement is Great Heck, there is also Little Heck at grid reference SE599220. Before April 1974 it was part of Osgoldcross Rural District and the West Riding of Yorkshire. From 1974 to 2023 it was part of the Selby District, it is now administered by the unitary North Yorkshire Council.

It was the location of the fatal Selby rail crash in February 2001.
