= Great Heck =

Village in North Yorkshire, England

Coordinates: 53.682°N 1.103°W

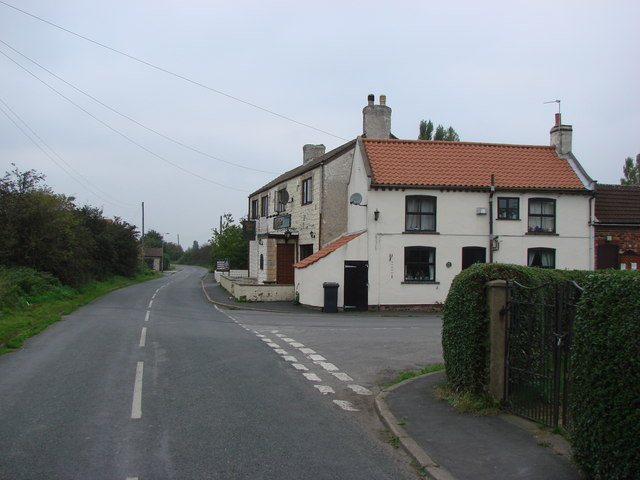
- The New Inn at Great Heck

- Location within North Yorkshire
- Population: 201 (2011 census)
- OS grid reference: SE593210
- Civil parish: Heck
- Unitary authority: North Yorkshire
- Ceremonial county: North Yorkshire
- Region: Yorkshire and the Humber
- Country: England
- Sovereign state: United Kingdom
- Post town: GOOLE
- Postcode district: DN14
- Police: North Yorkshire
- Fire: North Yorkshire
- Ambulance: Yorkshire
- UK Parliament: Selby

Great Heck is a small village in Heck parish, about 7 miles (11 km) south of Selby, North Yorkshire, England. The population of the parish was 201 at the 2011 census.

Until 1974 it was part of the West Riding of Yorkshire. From 1974 to 2023 it was part of the Selby District, it is now administered by the unitary North Yorkshire Council. The village was the site of the Great Heck rail crash in 2001.

The name Heck derives from the Old English hæcc meaning 'hatch'.

== Village ==
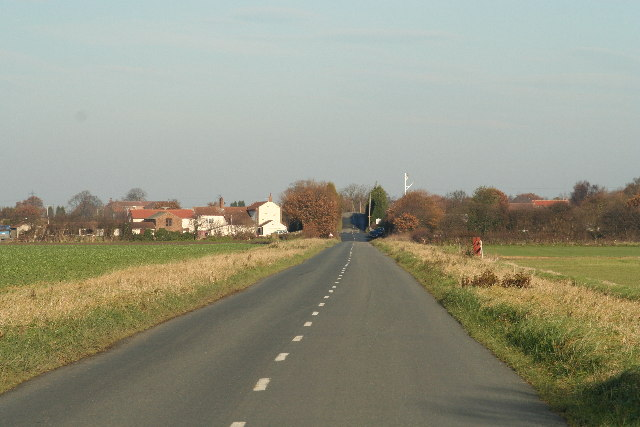
Heck Lane

The village of Great Heck is a rural community. It consists mainly of detached residential housing and small companies such as Great Heck Brewery. There are a number of farms and a nursery.

== Demographics ==
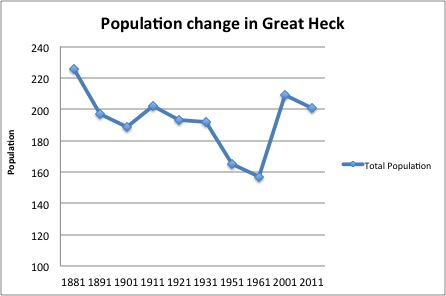
Population of Great Heck from 1881 to 2011

=== Population ===
The first recorded census occurred in 1841. A census was carried out every ten years up until 1961. Information and statistics were available on total population, population change, gender and area throughout the time the census were being carried out. There are no census records for 1941 due to the Second World War. There is no great change in population from 1881 to 1961, although in 1931 the census data showed a population of 192 and in 1951 it had decreased to 165. This may have been the result of the Second World War. From 1961 the census data began gathering information from some places by wards and no longer by parishes.

The 2011 census showed a population of 201, with the male:female ratio as even as possible with 101 females and 100 males living in 80 households. The census shows that Great Heck consists mainly of families, with 43 people aged 5 – 19 and 93 people aged 30 – 59. Out of 201 people, 193 were born in England.

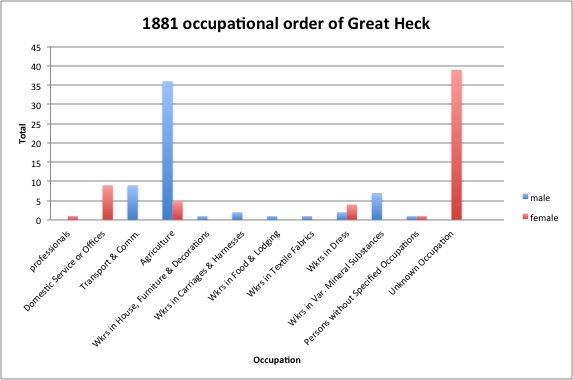
Occupation data for Great Heck in 1881

=== Occupational structure ===
The 1881 census provides information on the occupational category the population fall into. The data shows that 36 of the 116 males worked in agriculture while the other male workers were spread out in categories including transport, food and lodging and textile fabrics. Contrastingly, the female data shows that 39 of 110 women had unknown occupations. Other women worked in occupational categories such as agriculture and domestic services.

According to the 2011 census there were 111 people employed out of 201 people. Out of the 111, 57 were male and 54 female. The most popular categories of employment were wholesale and retail trade, construction and manufacturing.

== Transport ==
Great Heck is accessible through a number of lanes such as Heck and Pollington Lane, Heck Lane and Long Lane. Following Heck Lane and then taking a right turning into Balne Moor Road, you will eventually meet the A19 Road or Selby Road. This road joins up with the M62 motorway. There are 3 bus routes serving the parish Great Heck. The 486 bus travels from Selby to Hut green, stopping at five other locations in between including Great Heck. The 488 travels from Hut Green to Goole before stopping at seven other destinations including Great Heck. The 019s bus is a school service bus taking pupils to and from Holy Family RC School and The Snaith School. The nearest coach stop is Goole: Airmyn Road.

The nearest railway station is Hensall which is 1.2 miles (1.9 km) away. Whitley Bridge and Snaith stations are also nearby.

== Incidents ==
=== Great Heck rail crash ===
The Great Heck rail crash, also known as the Selby rail crash, was a high speed train accident that occurred on the morning of 28 February 2001. Ten people were killed, including the drivers of both trains, while a further 82 people suffered serious injuries. The crash occurred when a Land Rover towing a loaded trailer swerved off the M62 motorway just before a bridge over the East Coast Main Line. The vehicle then ran down an embankment and onto the southbound track. The driver of the Land Rover tried to reverse the car off the track but failed. After he exited the vehicle and called the emergency services, his Land Rover was hit by a southbound GNER InterCity 225 en route from Newcastle to London King's Cross. The train was travelling at over 120 miles per hour (190 km per hour).

The InterCity 225 was propelled by a Class 91 locomotive (No.91023) and led by a Driving Van Trailer (DVT). After striking the Land Rover, the leading bogie of the DVT derailed but the train stayed upright. Points to nearby sidings then deflected it into the path of an oncoming Freightliner freight train carrying coal from Immingham to Ferrybridge. The freight train hit the wreckage, resulting in severe to moderate damage to all nine of the InterCity 225's coaches.

Just before the impact of the two trains, the speed of the InterCity 225 was estimated at 88 mph (142 km/h) while the freight train was travelling at an estimated speed of 54 mph (87 km/h). The closing speed was said to be 142 mph (229 km/h) making it the highest speed railway incident in the UK.

=== 2015 refuse fire ===
Great Heck was affected for several months by a massive refuse fire in a privately owned waste tip that resisted attempts to extinguish it. The tip first combusted in May 2015 and continued to catch fire up until December 2015, by which time firefighters from North Yorkshire, South Yorkshire and Humberside had responded 385 times to the smouldering tip. In November 2015, local authorities, including Selby District Council, aided by North Yorkshire Fire and Rescue Service and the Environment Agency, started a clean-up effort intended to extinguish the fire. By January 2016, the contents were cleared and taken to a landfill site at Welbeck in West Yorkshire.
