= Listed buildings in Kellington =

Kellington is a civil parish in the county of North Yorkshire, England. It contains six listed buildings that are recorded in the National Heritage List for England. Of these, one is listed at Grade I, the highest of the three grades, and the others are at Grade II, the lowest grade. The parish contains the village of Kellington and the surrounding area. The listed buildings consist of a church, a cross in the churchyard and the gate piers at its entrance, a separate pair of gate piers, a windmill and a milestone.

== Key ==
Grade	Criteria
I	Buildings of exceptional interest, sometimes considered to be internationally important
II	Buildings of national importance and special interest

== Buildings ==
Name and location	Photograph	Date	Notes	Grade
St Edmund's Church; 53.71464°N 1.17124°W		c. 1100	The church has been altered and extended through the centuries, and was restored in 1867–69 by W. H. Crossland. It is built in magnesian limestone, and consists of a nave with a clerestory, a north aisle, a south porch, a chancel with a north chapel, and a west tower. The tower has three stages, stepped angle and diagonal and angle buttresses, a west window, bands, two-light bell openings, and an embattled parapet.	I
Churchyard cross 53.71449°N 1.17113°W		Late 13th century	The cross is in the churchyard of St Edmund's Church to the south of the church. It is in magnesian limestone, and is about 1.5 metres (4 ft 11 in) high. The cross consists of the remains of an octagonal shaft on an octagonal plinth with spurred corners.	II
Gate piers, St Edmund's Churchyard; 53.71441°N 1.17062°W		1698	The gate piers flanking the entrance to the churchyard of St Edmund's Church are in magnesian limestone and sandstone, and are about 2 metres (6 ft 7 in) high. They have a square plan, each pier has a cornice, a frieze and a ball finial, and the right pier is dated.	II
Gate piers, Roall House; 53.71614°N 1.13886°W	—	c. 1700	The gate piers are in magnesian limestone, they have a square plan, and are about 2.5 metres (8 ft 2 in) high. The piers are rusticated, with the remains of engaged Doric pilasters on the front. Each pier has a full entablature, an architrave, a frieze and a cornice.	II
Kellington Windmill; 53.71127°N 1.17428°W		Late 18th to early 19th century	The windmill is in magnesian limestone with some rendering and brick infill. It contains doorways and casement windows, all under segmental arches.	II
Milestone; 53.71679°N 1.13379°W		1832	The milestone on the east side of the A19 road is in magnesian limestone, and has a rectangular section and a gabled head. It is inscribed with the distances to Doncaster. Askern, Selby and York.	II
