= Beal, North Yorkshire =

Village and civil parish in North Yorkshire, England

Coordinates: 53.723°N 1.194°W

Beal
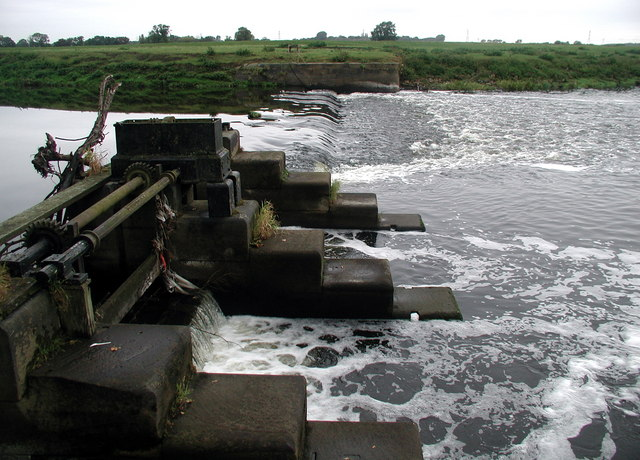
- Weir on the River Aire

- Location within North Yorkshire
- Population: 738 (2011 census)
- OS grid reference: SE5325
- Civil parish: Beal
- Unitary authority: North Yorkshire
- Ceremonial county: North Yorkshire
- Region: Yorkshire and the Humber
- Country: England
- Sovereign state: United Kingdom
- Post town: GOOLE
- Postcode district: DN14
- Dialling code: 01977
- Police: North Yorkshire
- Fire: North Yorkshire
- Ambulance: Yorkshire
- UK Parliament: Selby

Beal is a village and civil parish in North Yorkshire, England. It is situated on the River Aire, 3.5 miles (6 km) north-east of Knottingley, 8 miles (13 km) south-west of Selby, and 21 miles (34 km) south of York. The parish includes the village of Kellingley, and borders the City of Wakefield in West Yorkshire. At the 2001 census it had a population of 720, increasing to 738 at the 2011 census.

== Overview ==
The name "Beal" is of Old English origins and means "Nook of land in a river-bend". It is composed of the elements bēag ("river-bend") and halh ("nook of land"). The village was recorded as Begale in the Domesday Book of 1086.

Kellingley Colliery, the last operating deep coal mine in the United Kingdom, was located in the parish until its closure in December 2015.

Fishing on the River Aire is controlled by Leeds and District Amalgamated Society of Anglers. The main catches are roach and bream.

Bus service 476 operated by Arriva Yorkshire, connects the village with Pontefract, Ferrybridge, Knottingley, Kellingley, Beal, Kellington, Eggborough, Burn, Brayton and Selby.

== Governance ==
The village of Beal was a township in the ancient parish of Kellington in the wapentake of Osgoldcross and liberty of Pontefract in the West Riding of Yorkshire. It became a separate parish in 1866, and was incorporated into Pontefract poor law union in 1869. In 1875, the area of the poor law union became a rural sanitary district, which in 1894 was superseded by Pontefract Rural District. The rural district was abolished in 1938, and Beal became part of Osgoldcross Rural District, which was itself abolished under local government reorganisation in 1974, with the eastern part incorporated into the District of Selby in the new county of North Yorkshire. In 2023 the district councils in North Yorkshire were abolished and the village is now administered by the unitary North Yorkshire Council.
