= Kellington Windmill =

Windmill in Kellington, North Yorkshire, England

Coordinates: 53°42′41″N 1°10′28″W

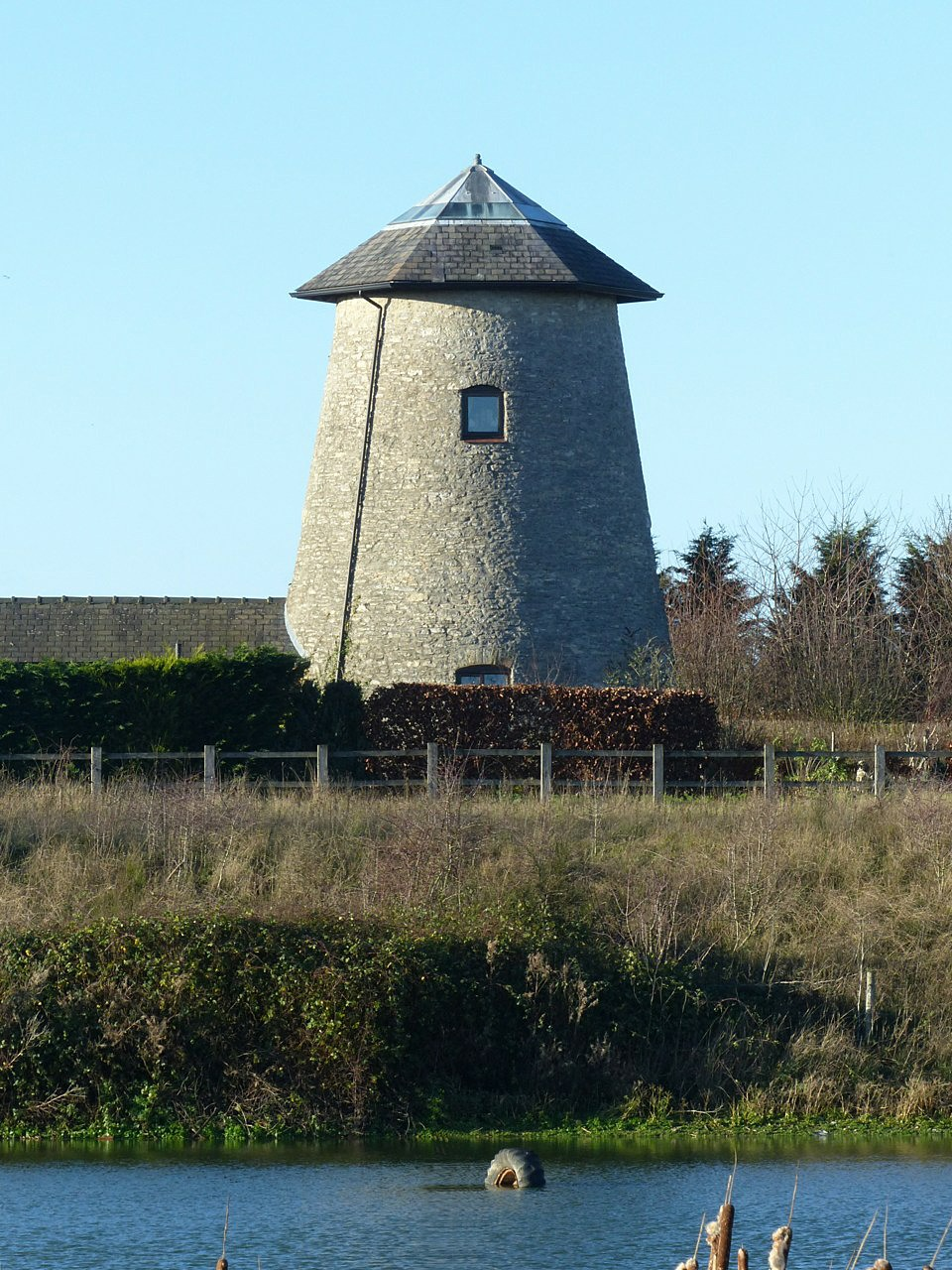
The windmill, in 2018

Kellington Windmill is a historic building in Kellington, a village in North Yorkshire, in England.

The windmill was built in about 1800, to grind corn. It originally had four floors and was powered solely by wind, but a paraffin engine was added so it could be used during calm periods, and after the First World War the sails were no longer in use. Milling ended in 1927, and the building was disused until the Second World War, when it was used as a look out post by the Home Guard. It was converted into a house, but then became derelict. For a short time it was used to grow mushrooms, but was then reconverted into a house.

The windmill was grade II listed in 1987. It is built of magnesian limestone with some rendering and brick infill. It contains doorways and casement windows, all under segmental arches. It originally had a cap, which is now missing.

== See also ==
- Listed buildings in Kellington
