= Listed buildings in Stapleton, Selby =

Stapleton, Selby is a civil parish in the county of North Yorkshire, England. It contains two listed buildings that are recorded in the National Heritage List for England. Of these, one is listed at Grade II*, the middle of the three grades, and the other is at Grade II, the lowest grade. The parish contains the village of Stapleton and the surrounding countryside, and the listed buildings consist of a former coach house and stables, and a farmhouse.

== Key ==
Grade	Criteria
II*	Particularly important buildings of more than special interest
II	Buildings of national importance and special interest

== Buildings ==
Name and location	Photograph	Date	Notes	Grade
Old Stable Court, Stapleton Park; 53.66775°N 1.23449°W		c. 1762	The coach house and stables, later used for other purposes, are in magnesian limestone on a plinth, with a hipped stone slate roof. They form an almost square plan with four ranges around a courtyard. The main north range has five bays, the middle three bays projecting, with two storeys and a pediment, and the outer bays have one storey. In the centre is a round-arched coach entrance with a moulded surround. On the outer bays are stable doors with fanlights and voussoir arches, and the windows are sashes with voussoir arches. There is a continuous impost band, and a moulded cornice. On the roof is an ornamental cupola, with a clock, an arcaded top, and a domed roof with a dated weathervane. The other ranges have a single storey, the side ranges have seven bays, and the south range, which is open, has three bays.	II*
Castle Farmhouse; 53.66051°N 1.21790°W		Mid to late 18th century	The farmhouse has a pebbledashed front, stone dressings, embattled parapets and a tile roof, and is in Gothic style. There are two storeys and four bays, the middle two bays projecting. The central doorway has a fanlight with a pointed head. The windows are sashes with pointed arches, some of which are blind.	II
