= Listed buildings in Birkin =

Birkin is a civil parish in the county of North Yorkshire, England. It contains five listed buildings that are recorded in the National Heritage List for England. Of these, one is listed at Grade I, the highest of the three grades, and the others are at Grade II, the lowest grade. The parish contains the village of Birkin and the surroundings area. All the listed buildings are in the village, and consist of a church, a coffin in the churchyard, a pair of gate piers, and two houses.

== Key ==
Grade	Criteria
I	Buildings of exceptional interest, sometimes considered to be internationally important
II	Buildings of national importance and special interest

== Buildings ==
Name and location	Photograph	Date	Notes	Grade
Coffin; 53.73252°N 1.19770°W	—	Roman	The coffin with a lid is in the churchyard of St Mary's Church, to the north of the tower. It dates from the Roman era and is in millstone grit. The coffin is about 2 metres (6 ft 7 in) long and 1 metre (3 ft 3 in) high, and has tooling on the sides and a shaped top.	II
St Mary's Church; 53.73246°N 1.19748°W		12th century	The church has been altered and extended through the centuries, including a restoration by John Oldrid Scott in 1882. It is built in magnesian limestone with a stone slate roof, and consists of a nave, a south aisle, a chancel with an apse, and a west tower. The tower has two stages, slits in the lower stage, bands, the upper one with gargoyles, two-light bell openings, and an embattled parapet with pinnacles. On the south front is a later timber porch, and a Norman doorway of four orders with various carvings, and three colonnettes with capitals decorated with interlace and scallops. The nave has an embattled parapet, and around the body of the church is a corbel table with a variety of carvings.	I
Gate piers, Birkin Hall; 53.73226°N 1.19682°W		c. 1700	The gate piers surviving from the demolished Birkin Hall are in magnesian limestone, they are approximately square, and 3.75 metres (12.3 ft) high. Each pier has a plinth, a plain shaft, a pulvinated frieze, a stepped cornice, and a base for a ball finial.	II
Birkin Grange; 53.73452°N 1.19843°W		Late 17th to early 18th century	A rectory, later a private house, it was altered in 1767, it is rendered and colourwashed, and has hipped stone slate roofs. There are two storeys, an H-shaped plan, and a front of three bays. The central doorway has pilasters, a fanlight, a frieze, a cornice, and a pediment. Most of the windows are sashes.	II
Birkin House; 53.73850°N 1.19254°W		Mid to late 18th century	The house is in pinkish-brown brick, with dressings in red brick, and a hipped stone slate roof. There are three storeys and five bays. The central doorway has a fanlight and a pediment on consoles. The windows are sashes, those on the front with flat heads, and some on the returns with cambered heads.	II
