= St Mary's Church, Birkin =

English church

Coordinates: 53°43′57″N 1°11′51″W

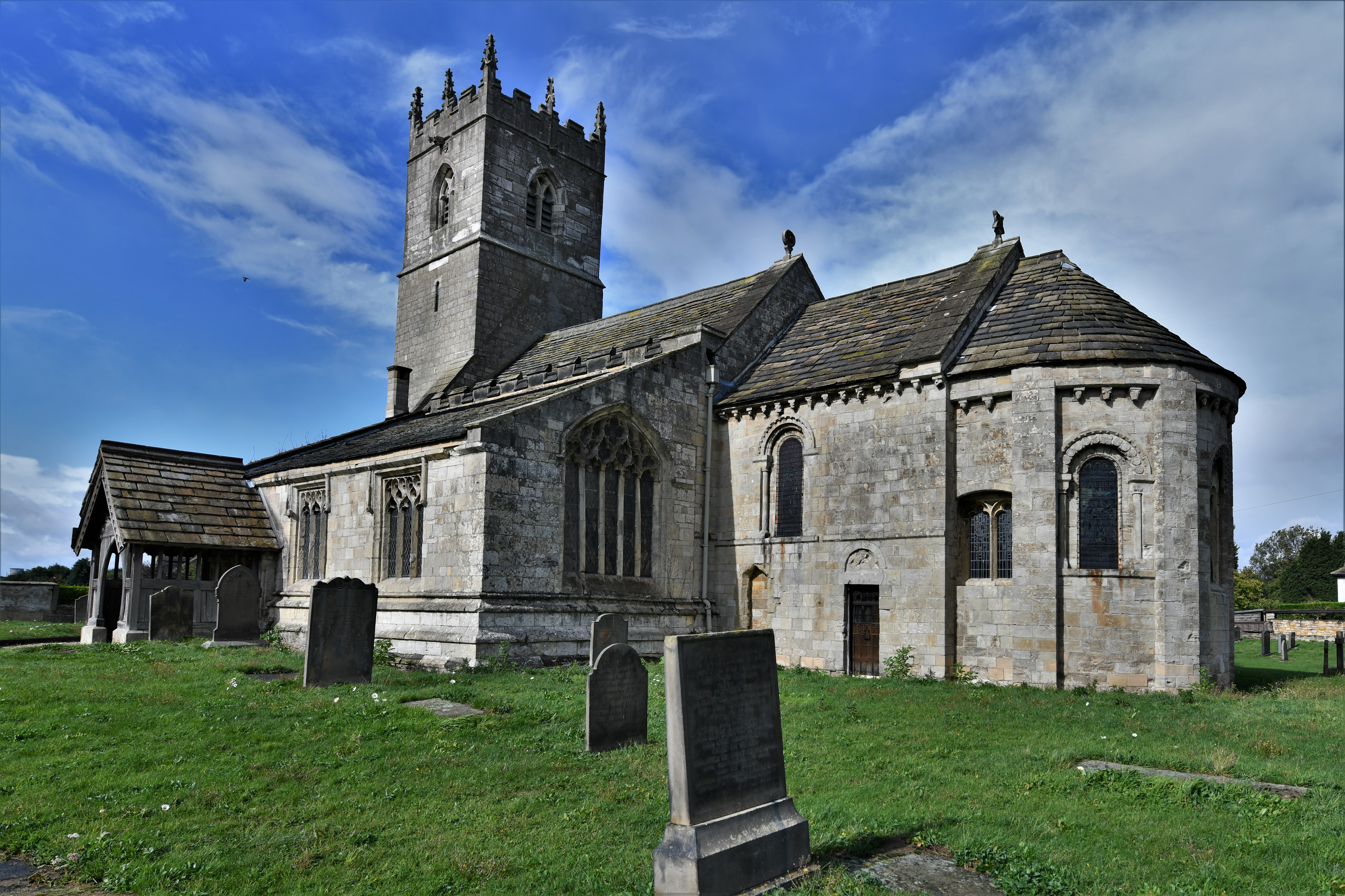
The church, in 2018

St Mary's Church is the parish church of Birkin, a village in North Yorkshire, in England.

The church was built in the 12th century, and survives largely intact from the period. A south aisle was added in the 14th century, when the top stage of the tower was also added. The church was restored in 1882 by John Oldrid Scott. It was Grade I listed in 1967.

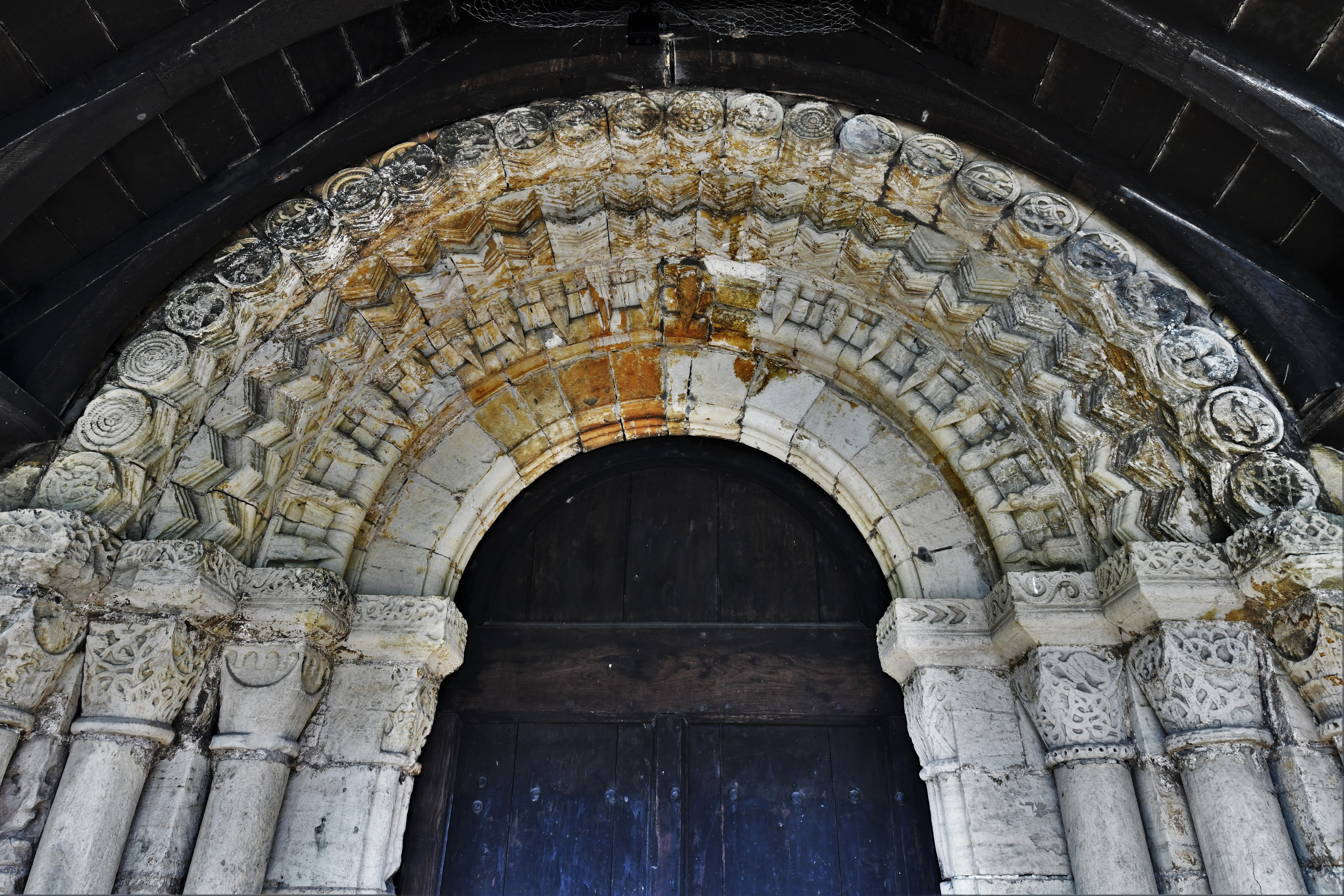
The 12th century doorway

The church is built of limestone with a stone slate roof, and has a wooden porch. It consists of a two-bay nave with a south aisle, a chancel and apse, and a west tower. The tower has two stages, slits in the lower stage, bands, the upper one with gargoyles, two-light bell openings, and an embattled parapet with pinnacles. On the south front is a later timber porch, and a Norman doorway of four orders with various carvings, and three colonnettes with capitals decorated with interlace and scallops. The nave has an embattled parapet, and around the body of the church is a corbel table with carvings including humans, masks, and animals. There are a variety of windows, some square headed, some round headed, and the east window has three lights and tracery. The east window of the south aisle has some 14th century stained glass.

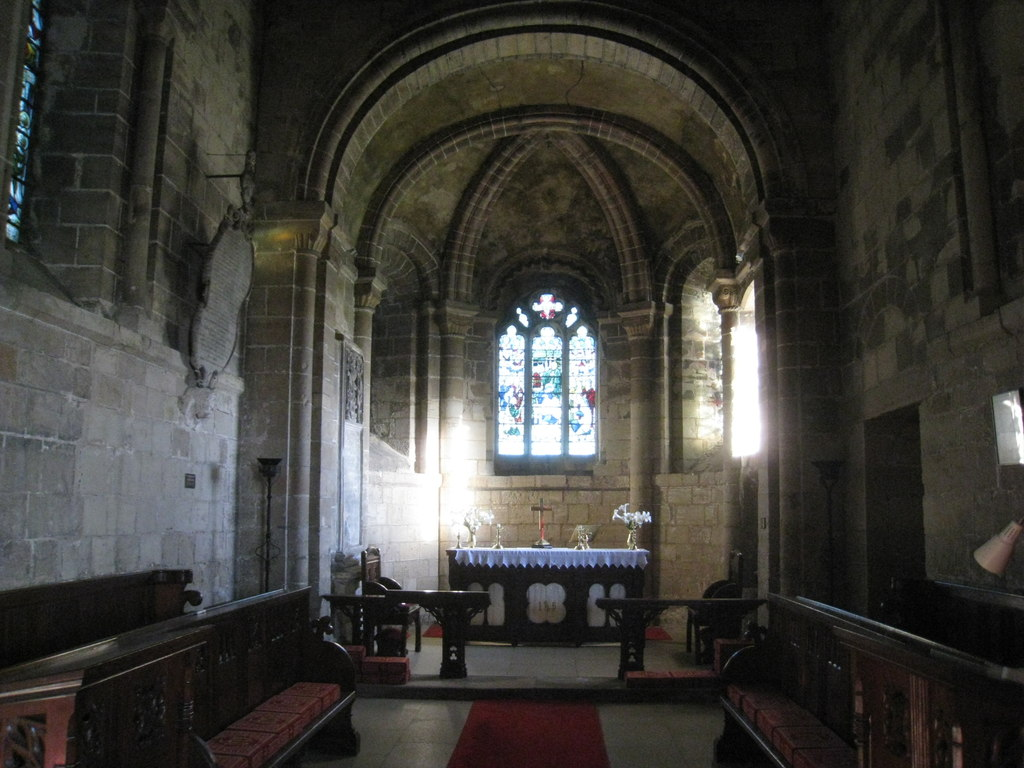
View from the choir into the apse

Inside the church is a 14th-century effigy of a man holding his heart in his hand. There is a 14th-century grave slab in the south aisle, and some 17th and 18th century monuments. There is a piscina in the south aisle with an ogee arch, and the font is dated 1663, but on an earlier base. In the churchyard is a Roman coffin, which is Grade II listed.

== See also ==
- Grade I listed buildings in North Yorkshire (district)
- Listed buildings in Birkin
