= Ferrybridge Henge =

Neolithic henge monument

Coordinates: 53.7124°N 1.2824°W

Map showing the location of Ferrybridge Henge within West Yorkshire

Ferrybridge Henge is a Neolithic henge near Ferrybridge, West Yorkshire (grid reference SE47462424). It is close to the A1 and M62 and Ferrybridge power station. Ferrybridge Henge is the furthest south of Yorkshire's henges, and is the only one in West Yorkshire. The site is of national importance and is protected from unauthorised change as a Scheduled Ancient Monument; despite this it is under threat from ploughing.

== History ==
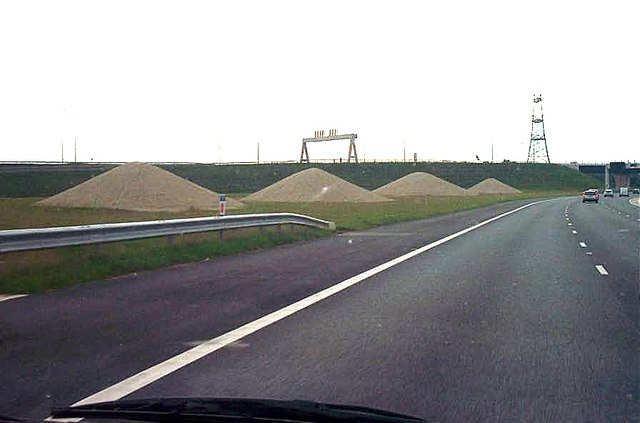
The location in 2006

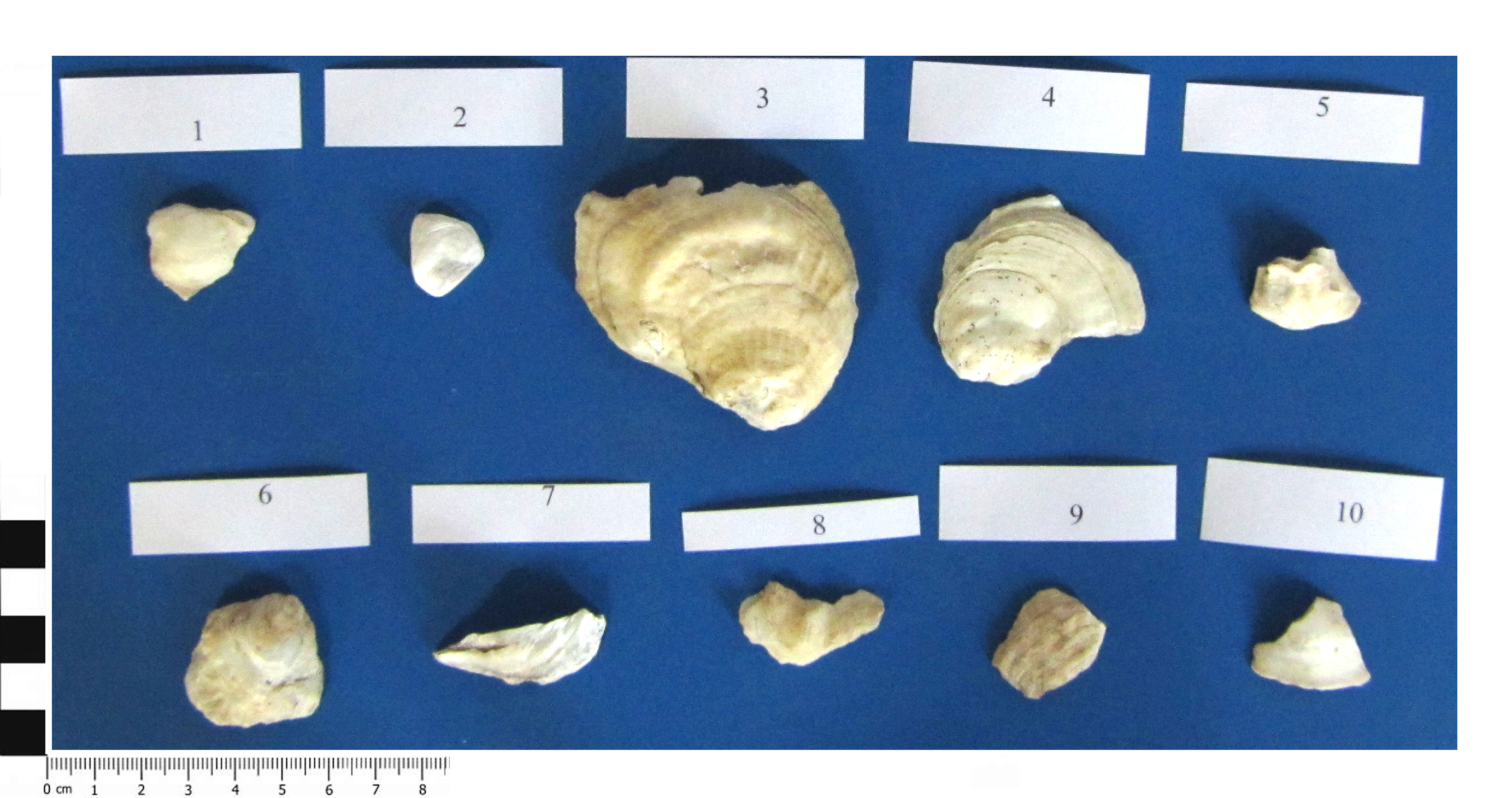
Animal remains found near Ferrybridge Henge

There was activity on the site before the current henge in the form of circular monuments and hengiform monuments dating from 3500 BC to 3000 BC. Ferrybridge Henge dates from 3000 BC to 2500 BC. Around 2000 BC–1500 BC, during the early Bronze Age, barrow burials were performed on the site. The inhumations were discovered with grave goods such as ceramic pots and flint tools. The area was probably abandoned from about 1500 BC to 500 BC when there was some reoccupation by Iron Age farmers. The henge was not cultivated and may have been retained as a shrine for the Iron Age people of the area and later during the Romano-British period. An Iron Age sword scabbard was discovered in the inner henge ditch as well as a Roman coin. That burials continued in the area around the henge in the Saxon period despite the presence of a Christian cemetery nearby has been taken as evidence of pagan beliefs prevailing in the area. Ferrybridge Henge and its surrounding area was used as farmland during the medieval period.

The site was excavated by West Yorkshire Archaeological Services in 1991. In 2007 a suspected extension of the henge was unearthed near Pontefract. The site consists of a field system and drainage ditches thought to date to the Iron Age or Romano-British periods. It was discovered when archaeologists were investigating a site intended for the construction of a row of houses; once the archaeological survey was complete, the construction went ahead.

== Layout ==
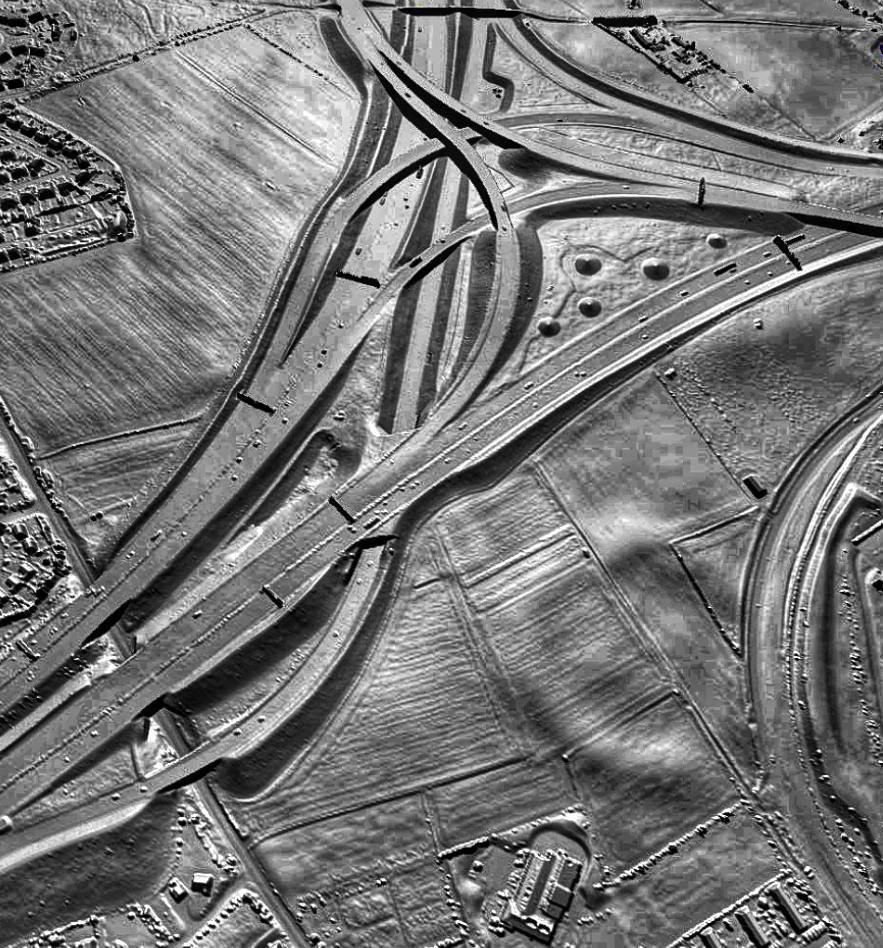
A lidar view of Ferrybridge Henge

Ferrybridge Henge is a circular site and is about 180 metres (590 ft) in diameter. The henge is surrounded by two ditches and a bank. The inner ditch is 10 metres (33 ft) wide and 2.5 metres (8.2 ft) deep. There is a 15-metre (49 ft) wide berm between the inner ditch and a 15-metre (49 ft) wide limestone bank. Separating the bank from the outer ditch is another berm, also 15 metres (49 ft) wide; the outer ditch is 12 metres (39 ft) wide and 1.5 metres (4.9 ft) deep. This layout is typical of other henges. The site has two entrances, one in the north east and one in the south west.
