= Birkin, North Yorkshire =

Village and civil parish in North Yorkshire, England

Coordinates: 53°44′07″N 1°11′49″W

Birkin
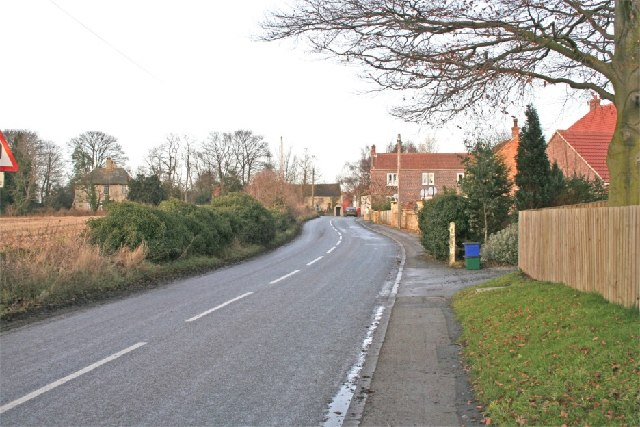
- Main street, Birkin

- Location within North Yorkshire
- Population: 141 (2011 census)
- OS grid reference: SE530268
- Civil parish: Birkin
- Unitary authority: North Yorkshire
- Ceremonial county: North Yorkshire
- Region: Yorkshire and the Humber
- Country: England
- Sovereign state: United Kingdom
- Post town: KNOTTINGLEY
- Postcode district: WF11
- Police: North Yorkshire
- Fire: North Yorkshire
- Ambulance: Yorkshire

Birkin is a village and civil parish in the south-west of the county of North Yorkshire, England. It is north of the River Aire, near Beal, North Yorkshire. The closest town is Knottingley, in West Yorkshire, 4 miles (6 km) to the south-west. The parish had a population of 146 at the 2001 census, which fell to 141 at the 2011 census. Until 1974, it was part of the West Riding of Yorkshire. From 1974 to 2023 it was part of the Selby District, it is now administered by the unitary North Yorkshire Council.

== History ==
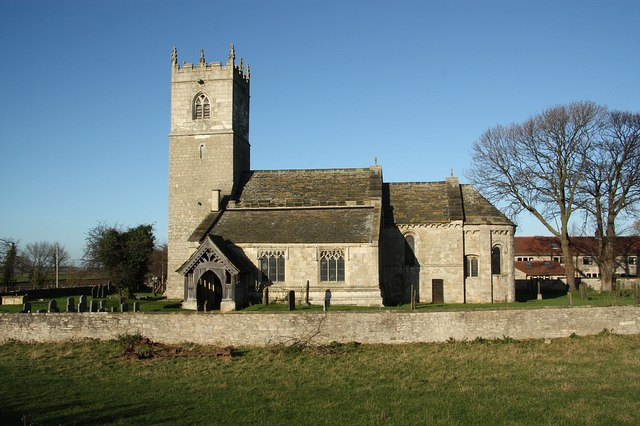
St Mary's Church, Birkin

Birkin is recorded in the Domesday Book as 'Birchinge'. This and the present name suggest that, when the village was first established, it was in an area heavily laden with birch trees. The village's St Mary's Church, built around 1150, is a Grade I listed building. The village is also notable as the birthplace of the 19th-century political philosopher Thomas Hill Green (b. 1836.)

The 2016 Tour de Yorkshire passed through Birkin in its second stage (Otley to Doncaster).

Birkin has two lakes east of the village that are used for public fishing. It also has a tea room.

=== St Mary's Church ===
St Mary's Church, situated at the southern end of Birkin, dates from around 1150. Descriptions of the church refer to a number of monuments. One is a cartouche for the Thornton family: During the 17th century, several successive generations of this family were rectors of the church. Another is an 18th-century wall monument dedicated to the wife of one of the rectors. It includes an inscription by Poet Laureate William Whitehead. In the 1830s, the father of the political philosopher Thomas Hill Green was the rector of the church.

In 2008, it was reported that the church had been damaged after the roof was targeted by lead thieves.

== See also ==
- Listed buildings in Birkin
