= Church of St Edmund King and Martyr, Kellington =

Grade I listed church in North Yorkshire, England

St Edmunds' Church
- Church of St Edmund King and Martyr, Kellington
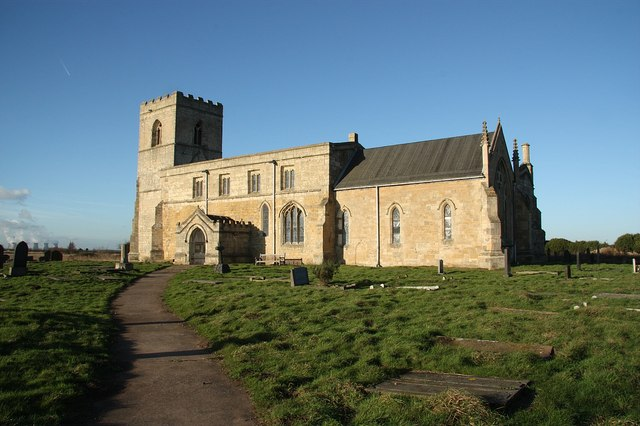
- St Edmund's Church

- Location within North Yorkshire
- 53.7146°N 1.1712°W
- OS grid reference: SE 54792 24561
- Location: Kellington, North Yorkshire
- Country: England
- Denomination: Church of England
- Website: Official website

History
- Status: Active

Architecture
- Architectural type: Norman; Early English; Decorated

Specifications
- Height: 54 feet (16 m) (tower)

Administration
- Diocese: Leeds
- Archdeaconry: Pontefract
- Deanery: Pontefract
- Benefice: Knottingley and Kellington with Whitley
- Parish: Kellington

Listed Building – Grade I
- Designated: 11 December 1967
- Reference no.: 1148402

The Church of St Edmund King and Martyr, Kellington, is a grade I listed 12th century church in the village of Kellington, North Yorkshire, England. Excavations at the site have revealed the 14th century tomb related to the Knights Templar, and in the 1990s, the foundations of the church were underpinned because of possible subsidence effects from the nearby Kellingley Colliery.

Its separation from the village upon elevated land, makes it a local landmark and it has been commented upon throughout history. A stone with Medieval carvings upon it was found in the church and has given rise to a legend attached to it about a shepherd fighting a snake. The Kellington Serpent-Stone is one of the attractions of the church.

== History ==
The church is located 0.25 miles (0.40 km) outside of the village to the west on elevated ground. Excavations detailed the possibility that the low hill that the church sits on had earlier religious significance, with the belief that a Saxon church once stood on the site. The English antiquary, Roger Dodsworth, stated that the church was in "splendid isolation" from the village. Likewise, the local plan as created by Selby District Council states "St Edmund's Church, to the west of Kellington, dominates the skyline when viewed from the village and is a particularly fine Grade I listed building."

The church was recorded in the late 12th century when the Knights Templar appointed John de Kellington as the rector. At that time, the Knights Templar had possession of a great acreage of land in the immediate area. The church is believed to have been in existence before 1177, as it had been granted to the Knights Templar by Henri de Lacy, who died in 1177 whilst on a Crusade. A vicarage was first recorded in 1291, and a survey conducted in 1307 stated that "The templars also hold the church at Kelyngton[sic] for their own use...", though in 1308, Sir John Crepping, the sheriff of the area, seized the lands of the Templars, which included the church at Kellington. It is known that many Templars were buried at Kellington, though some graves have been lost through restoration.

In 1310, it was given to Sir Miles de Stapleton, who retained it for only three years before giving it up. By 1342, St Edmund's was in the hands of the Knights Hospitaller. After the Hospitallers, ownership and advowson of the church passed to Trinity College in Cambridge.

As the church has Norman origins, the main part of the church is in this style, though the tower was added later. Renovations and refurbishments over the years have also led to other architectural styles, most notably Early English and Decorated.

In 1548, the Kellington Serpent-Stone was removed from a recess in the north wall of the chantry chapel. The stone, which is magnesian limestone, has an ornately carved sword down the middle with a human figure on the left and a "grotesque" figure on the right. The stone was placed in the churchyard, but due to the effects of weather, it was returned to the church in the 1920s. The best description of the stone before it was weathered was by Roger Dodsworth who visited in 1621. Dodsworth described the grotesque figure as a "flying serpent", and alluded the stone to a local story where a shepherd killed the serpent but died in the struggle.

The vicar of Kellington in the late 1850s, Joseph Mann, helped raise money for a chapel-of-ease at nearby Whitley. This became All Saints' Parish Church, which was a daughter church of St Edmund's, and as such had no burial ground. Both churches held joint worship with the local Methodist congregations in the 1960s and in the 2000s.

Due to the risk of subsidence that might be caused by the proposed extension of the workings of the nearby Kellingley Colliery, underpinning of the church was deemed necessary. An archaeological excavation was undertaken from October 1990 to April 1991 to excavate the burials within the church and within the footprint of the proposed underpinning. The excavation was run by York University, under the direction of Richard Morris, Julie Dunk and Ian Lawton, with Warwick Rodwell recording the tower. Part of the renovation of the church meant storing many of the disinterred skeletons in an ossuary that was built beneath the tower. The underpinning venture was then undertaken. British Coal spent £1 million in 1991, (Note: This was the cost as listed in 1991) making sure that the church would not collapse. The tower was dismantled and when the underpinning work was finished, was rebuilt exactly as it was before. Further renovations were carried out in the 21st century. The earlier renovations revealed that the original floor of the church was made up of limestone rubble, with mortar used in the spaces.

== Listed structures ==
Besides the church itself, which is grade I listed, there are a further two structures within the churchyard that are listed with Historic England;

- The gate piers to the churchyard, which are dated to 1698.
- The churchyard cross

Additionally, the churchyard is registered with the Commonwealth War Graves Commission.

== See also ==
- Grade I listed buildings in North Yorkshire (district)
- Listed buildings in Kellington
