= Stapleton Park =

Country estate in North Yorkshire, England

Coordinates: 53°39′59″N 1°14′01″W

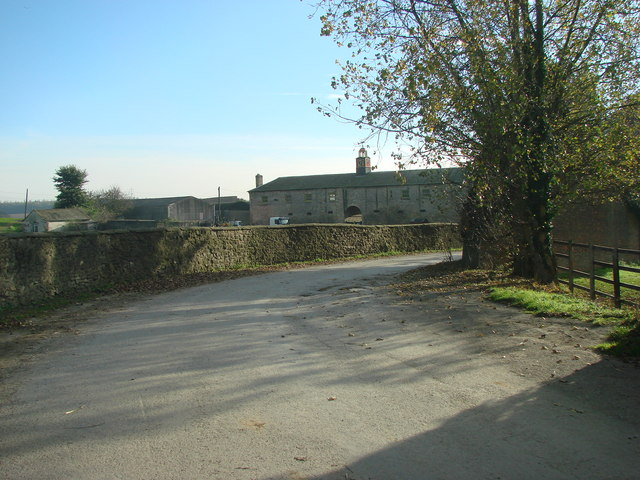
The former stable block

Stapleton Park is a country estate in Stapleton, a village near Selby in North Yorkshire, in England.

The manor of Stapleton was recorded in the Domesday Book and passed through numerous owners before Edward Lascelles purchased it in 1762. He commissioned John Carr to design a new house, and Richard Woods to lay out a park and gardens. In 1782, Capability Brown was commissioned to undertake further design work in the park, followed in 1783 and 1784 by Thomas White; it is unknown how much influence either had on the landscape. The house was partly dismantled in 1921. In 1937, the West Riding Mental Hospital Board purchased the estate, with the intention of converting the house into housing for patients, but finding it unsuitable, it instead demolished the house. It sold the estate in 1958, and much of the estate was converted into farmland, with some areas of woodland retained.

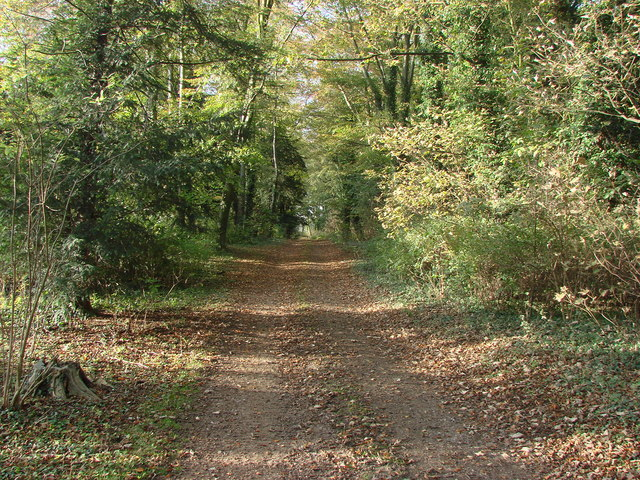
Track through woodland on the estate

The former coach house and stables, built around the same time as the house, survives. The building is grade II* listed. It is constructed of magnesian limestone on a plinth, with a hipped stone slate roof. It forms an almost square plan with four ranges around a courtyard. The main north range has five bays, the middle three bays projecting, with two storeys and a pediment, and the outer bays have one storey. In the centre is a round-arched coach entrance with a moulded surround. On the outer bays are stable doors with fanlights and voussoir arches, and the windows are sashes with voussoir arches. There is a continuous impost band, and a moulded cornice. On the roof is an ornamental cupola, with a clock, an arcaded top, and a domed roof with a dated weathervane. The other ranges have a single storey, the side ranges have seven bays, and the south range, which is open, has three bays.

== See also ==
- Grade II* listed buildings in North Yorkshire (district)
- Listed buildings in Stapleton, Selby
