= Brotherton =

Village and civil parish in North Yorkshire, England

Coordinates: 53°43′42″N 1°16′19″W

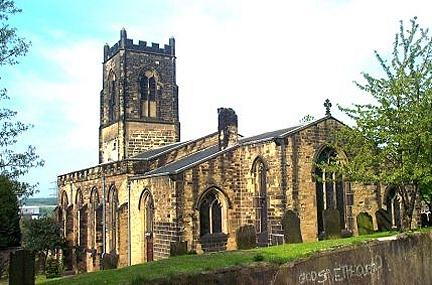
- Church of St Edward the Confessor

- Location within North Yorkshire
- Population: 728 (2011 census)
- OS grid reference: SE481259
  - London: 160 mi (260 km) SSE
- Civil parish: Brotherton
- Unitary authority: North Yorkshire
- Ceremonial county: North Yorkshire
- Region: Yorkshire and the Humber
- Country: England
- Sovereign state: United Kingdom
- Post town: KNOTTINGLEY
- Postcode district: WF11
- Police: North Yorkshire
- Fire: North Yorkshire
- Ambulance: Yorkshire
- UK Parliament: Selby

Brotherton is a village and civil parish in the county of North Yorkshire, England. The village is on a border with the City of Wakefield and West Yorkshire (here formed by the River Aire).

== History ==
The name Brotherton derives from the Old English brōðor meaning 'brother' or the Old Norse personal name Brothir, and the Old English tūn meaning 'settlement'.

Brotherton was historically part of the West Riding of Yorkshire until 1974. From 1974 to 2023 it was part of the Selby District. It is now administered by the unitary North Yorkshire Council.

The village was on the A1 road 2 miles (3 km) north of Knottingley, before the road was relocated. It was linked to Ferrybridge, across the River Aire, by the grade I listed Ferry Bridge. It is now on the A162, south of Fairburn. Brotherton is often mistaken as being in West Yorkshire; it is a North Yorkshire village.

According to the 2001 census Brotherton civil parish had a population of 672, rising to 728 at the 2011 Census.

Brotherton is the birthplace of Thomas of Brotherton, Earl of Norfolk, son of King Edward I and Margaret of France. Notable Brotherton residents include Ken Wharton (b 1950), a writer of Military History books, who lived in the village between 2005 and 2009.

Brotherton Church of England parish church, dedicated to Edward the Confessor, is in the Diocese of Wakefield.

== Governance ==
Brotherton is part of Fairburn with Brotherton electoral ward. The total population of this ward as measured at the 2011 Census was 3,538.

== See also ==
- Listed buildings in Brotherton
