= Stapleton, Selby =

Village in North Yorkshire, England

Coordinates: 53°40′14″N 1°13′28″W

Stapleton
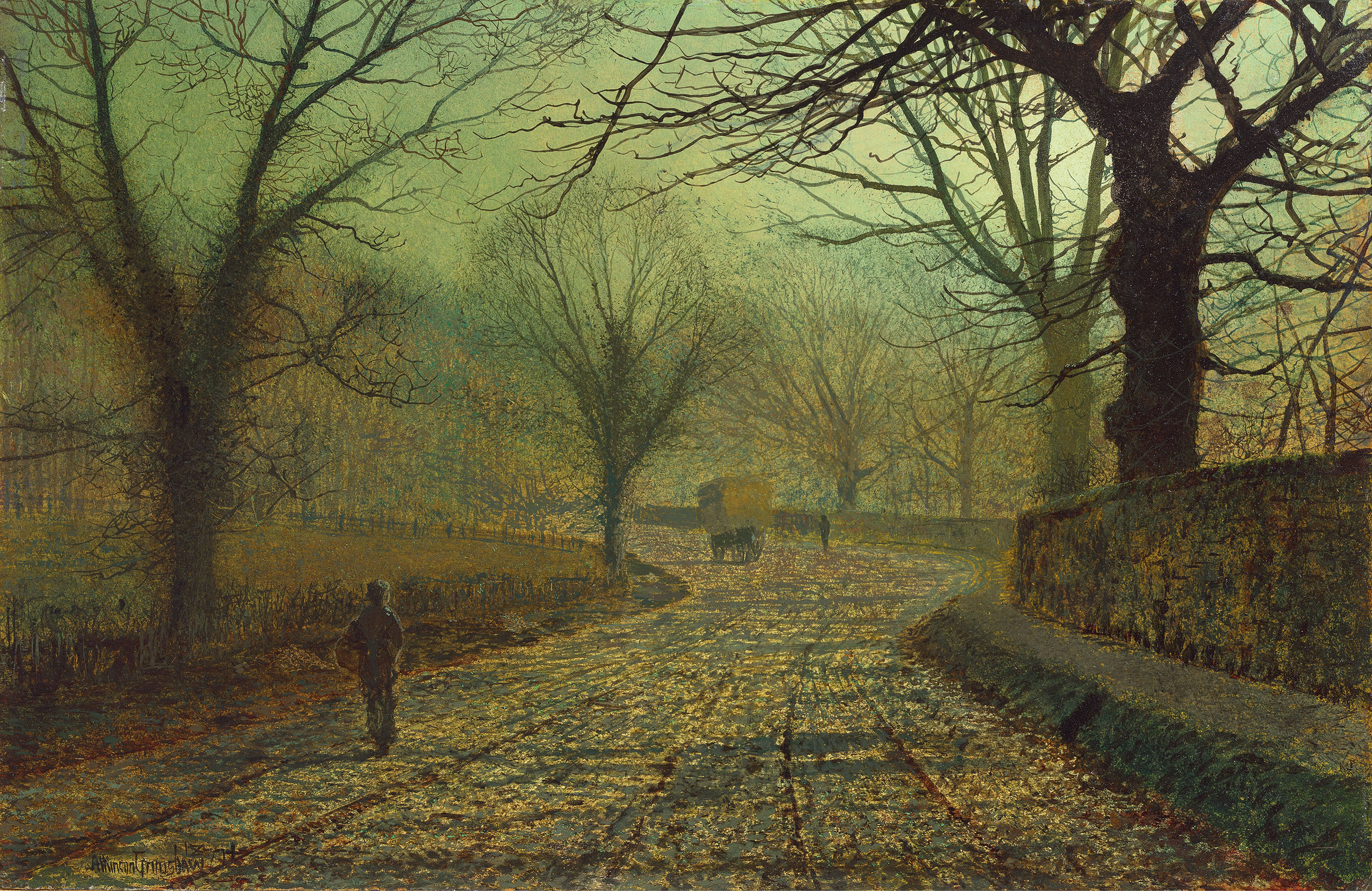
- View by Grimshaw 1877 in what is still a rural area

- Location within North Yorkshire
- Population: 59 (2001 census)
- OS grid reference: SE513196
  - London: 155 mi (249 km) SSE
- Civil parish: Stapleton
- Unitary authority: North Yorkshire
- Ceremonial county: North Yorkshire
- Region: Yorkshire and the Humber
- Country: England
- Sovereign state: United Kingdom
- Post town: PONTEFRACT
- Postcode district: WF8
- Dialling code: 01977
- Police: North Yorkshire
- Fire: North Yorkshire
- Ambulance: Yorkshire
- UK Parliament: Selby

Stapleton is a village and civil parish in North Yorkshire, England. In 2001 the parish had a population of 59. The population taken at the 2011 Census was less than 100. Details are included in the civil parish of Womersley. It is situated approximately 3 miles (5 km) south-east from the towns of Pontefract and Knottingley.

From 1974 to 2023 it was part of the Selby District, it is now administered by the unitary North Yorkshire Council.

The name Stapleton derives from the Old English stapoltūn meaning 'post settlement'.

Stapleton Park was the subject of a well-known painting of the Victorian era by John Atkinson Grimshaw.

Stapleton is home to the Stapleton Colony of the Brotherhood Church.

== See also ==
- Listed buildings in Stapleton, Selby

== Gallery ==
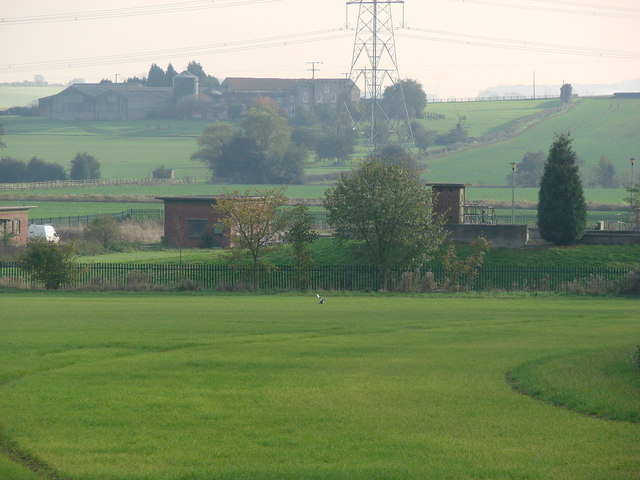
The sewage works, New Lane, Stapleton

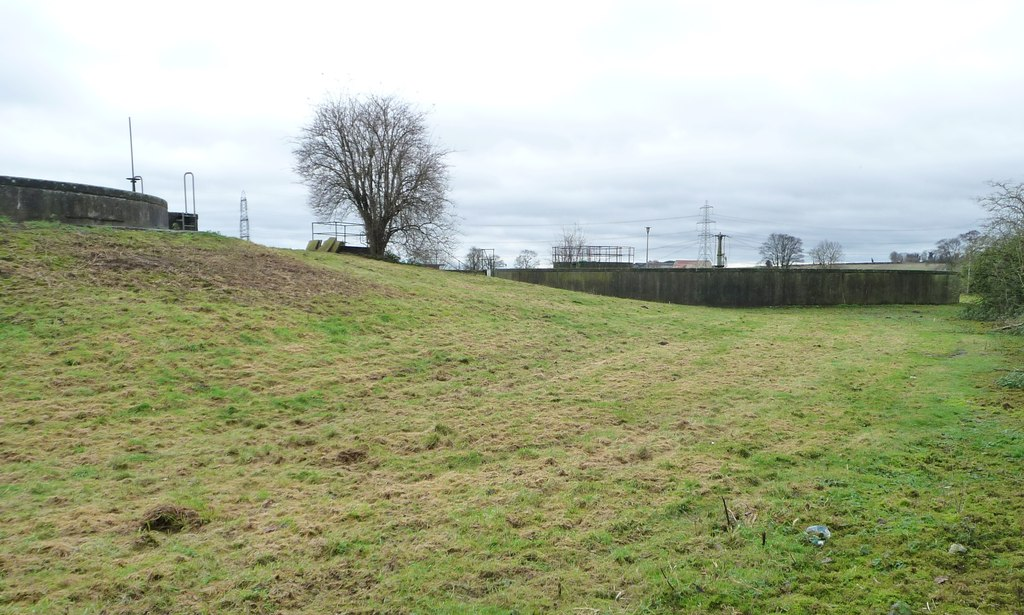
Sedimentation tank, New Road sewage works, Stapleton

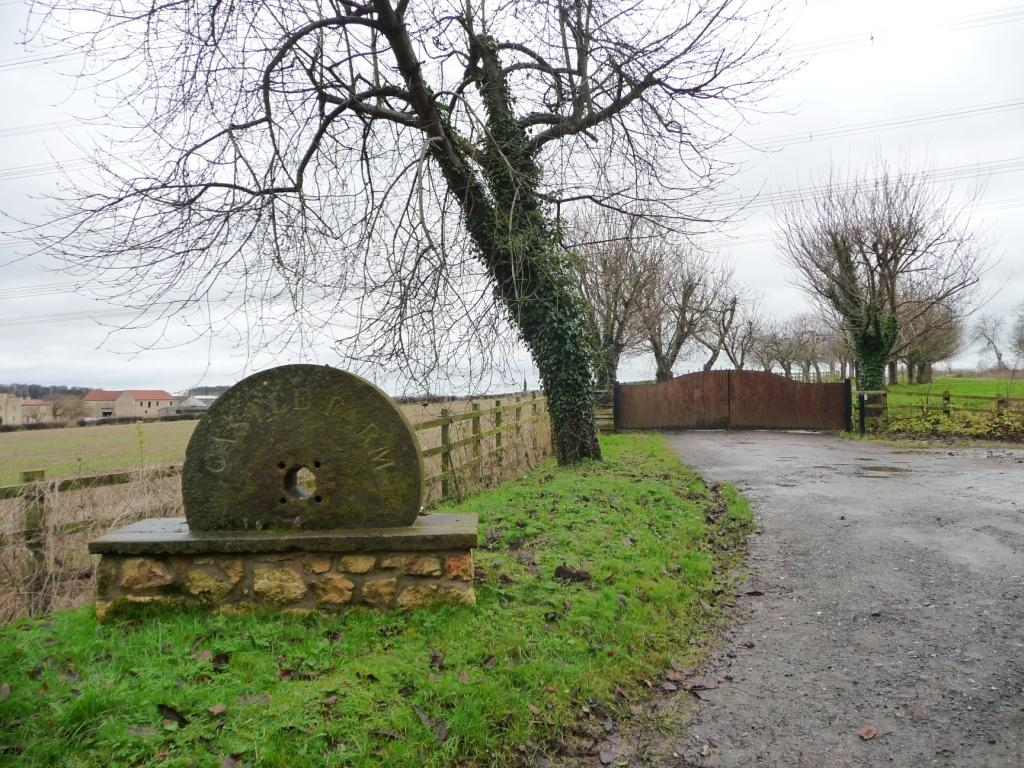
Gated entrance to Castle Farm, off New Road

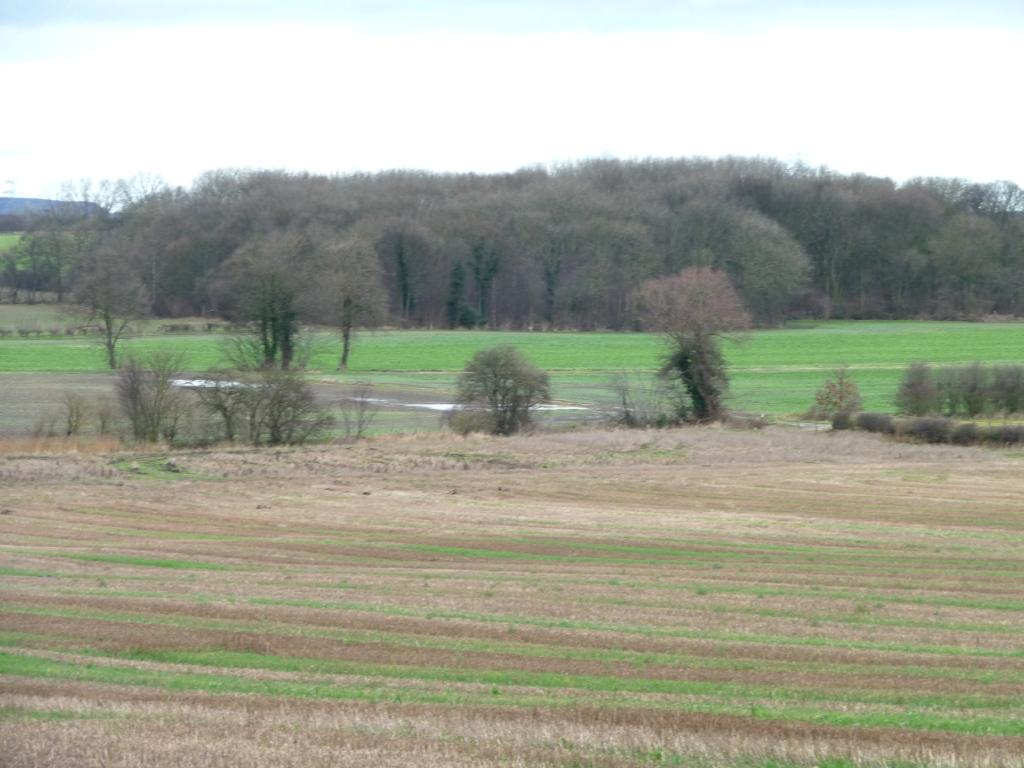
Waterlogged land between two parallel drains, Stapleton

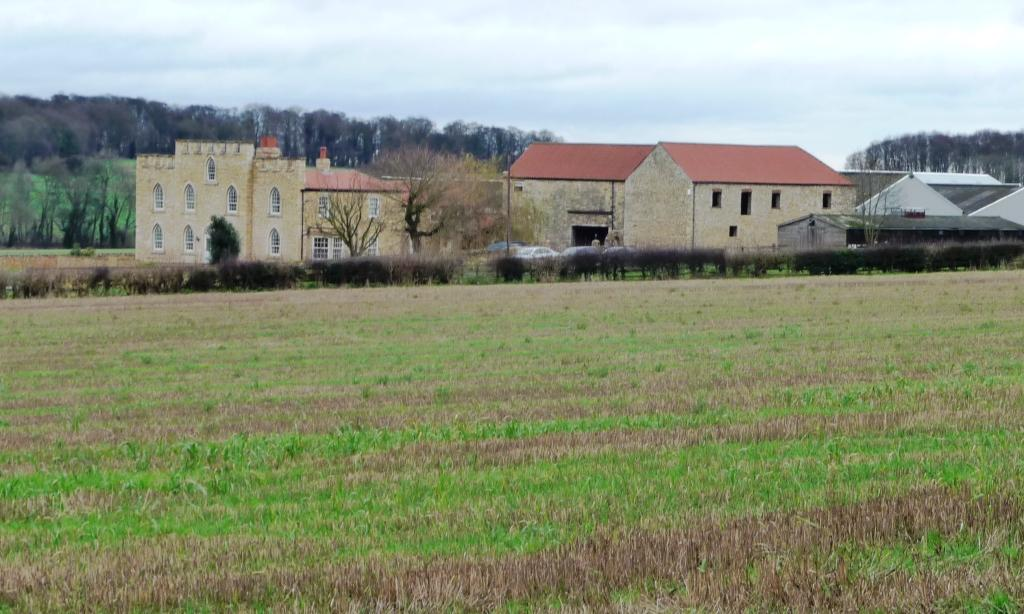
Castle Farm Stapleton with distinctive castle building
