= Kellington =

Village and civil parish in North Yorkshire, England

Coordinates: 53°43′04″N 1°09′55″W

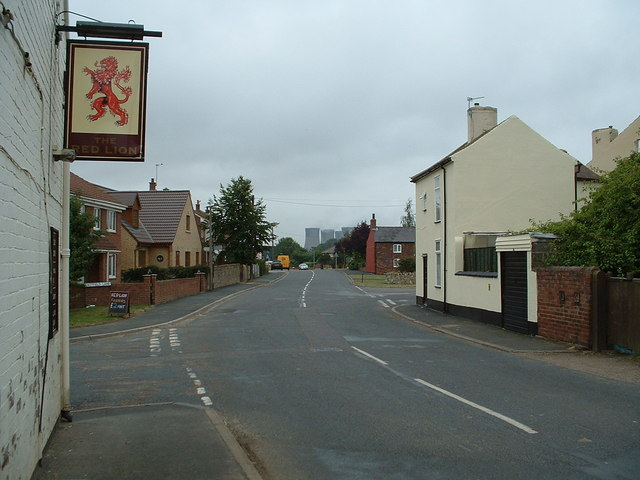
- Kellington centre

- Location within North Yorkshire
- Population: 991 (2011 census)
- OS grid reference: SE551249
- Civil parish: Kellington
- Unitary authority: North Yorkshire
- Ceremonial county: North Yorkshire
- Region: Yorkshire and the Humber
- Country: England
- Sovereign state: United Kingdom
- Post town: GOOLE
- Postcode district: DN14
- Police: North Yorkshire
- Fire: North Yorkshire
- Ambulance: Yorkshire

Kellington is a small village and civil parish in the county of North Yorkshire, England, on the banks of the River Aire. Situated almost equidistant between the towns of Pontefract and Selby, the village dates back to at least the 11th century when it was listed in the Domesday Book (as Chelinctone). The semi-rural community grew in size with the advent of local mining as housing was built to accommodate the workers of nearby Kellingley Colliery.

The village was historically part of the West Riding of Yorkshire until 1974. From 1974 to 2023 it was part of the Selby District, it is now administered by the unitary North Yorkshire Council.

Due to its location at the southernmost tip of North Yorkshire, the village is close to the borders of West, East and South Yorkshire. Its proximity to both the A19 and M62 major roads has resulted in a steady population growth, although to a lesser extent than its neighbour, Eggborough.

The low-lying ground that separates the village from the River Aire has given rise to a history of flooding the surrounding farmland, most recently in 2000.

== Governance ==
The village was represented on the former Selby District Council by husband-and-wife couple John and Mary McCartney. John is also the North Yorkshire County Councillor for the division of Osgoldcross, which includes Kellington.

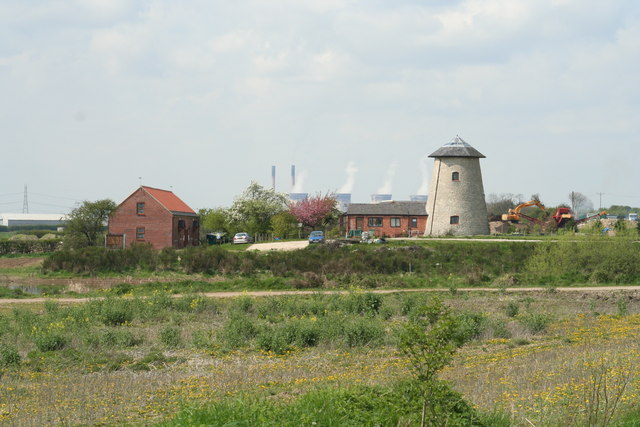
Kellington Windmill, now converted into a house

In 2008 the continuation of Kellington as a separate village was put at risk because of a proposal to turn it, along with neighbouring Beal and Eggborough, into a new town, under a scheme being promoted by the then Labour government of building so-called eco-towns around the country. This specific proposal was put in by a Leeds-based developer, GMI. A protest led by John and Mary McCartney against the proposal saw all three villages being opposed to the development. Selby councillors voted to not allow the project to proceed in June 2008.

== Amenities ==
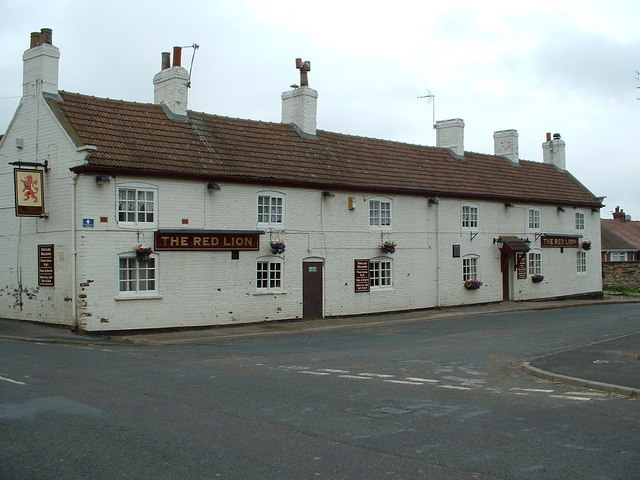
The Red Lion

Kellington has a variety of housing, with traditional country cottages, council housing and modern housing estates. The village is served by a pub, hotel and restaurant, Kellington Manor Hotel, which was previously known as Tree Tops and also as Squires, a small public house, The Red Lion. The small convenience store and the village Post Office have now both closed and the old Vicarage which was a guesthouse was demolished. There is a care / retirement home in the village. The majority of local children attend Kellington County Primary School, which as of January 2018 was serving 117 pupils.

=== Notable places ===
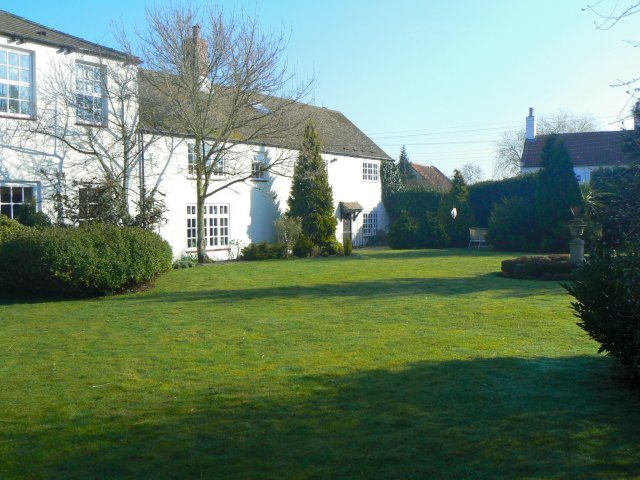
The old vicarage of Kellington

Of interest in Kellington is the local parish church, St Edmunds, dating back to at least 1177, its gate posts were built in 1698 and are grade II listed.

Located just inside the village boundary is Beal Carrs, a watered area formed in 1999 as a result of extensive flooding. Popular with birdwatchers, the Carrs are visited by Kestrels, Grey Herons and other birds and wildfowl.

Blackburn and Scotland Under 21 Tom Cairney grew up in Kellington.

=== HMS Kellington ===
The Ton-class minesweeper Kellington was named after the village.

== See also ==
- Listed buildings in Kellington
