= Selby rail crash =

2001 rail crash in North Yorkshire, England

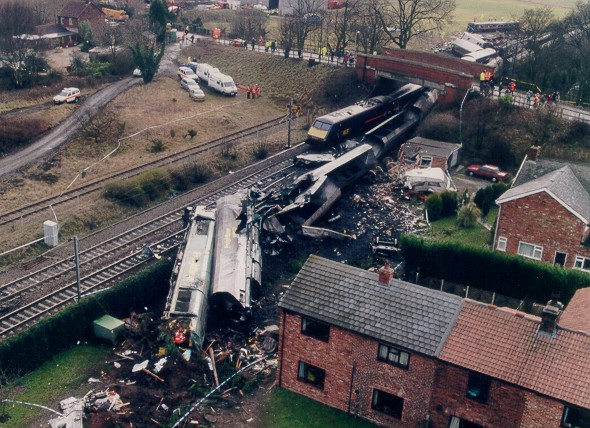
- The aftermath of the crash, with the front of the freight train in the foreground and the rear of the passenger train in the background

Details
- Date: 28 February 2001; 06:13 UTC
- Location: Great Heck, Selby, North Yorkshire
- Coordinates: 53°41′14″N 1°05′53″W
- Country: England
- Line: East Coast Main Line
- Operator: Great North Eastern Railway; Freightliner
- Service: 04:45 Newcastle to London King's Cross; 05:00 Immingham Docks to Ferrybridge power station
- Cause: Obstruction on line

Statistics
- Trains: 2
- Vehicles: 1 (car)
- Passengers: 97
- Crew: 5 (3 passenger train, 2 freight train)
- Deaths: 10 (9 passenger train, 1 freight train)
- Injured: 82

The Selby rail crash (also known as the Great Heck rail crash) was a railway accident that occurred on 28 February 2001 near Great Heck, Selby, North Yorkshire when a passenger train collided with a car which had crashed down a motorway embankment onto the railway line. The passenger train then collided with an oncoming freight train. Ten people died, including the drivers of the two trains, and 82 were injured. It remains the worst rail disaster of the 21st century in the United Kingdom.

The driver of the car, Gary Hart, was convicted of ten counts of causing death by dangerous driving and sentenced to five years in prison after a jury found that he had fallen asleep while driving. Hart's insurers paid out £30 million in claims. The Health and Safety Executive investigated the accident, and made several recommendations, including research into the crashworthiness of rail vehicles. The Health and Safety Commission and Highways Agency created working groups to investigate the risks of road vehicle incursions onto railways. The Department for Transport issued a report containing guidance for assessing and mitigating the risks identified by the working groups.

== Background ==
The passenger train was an InterCity 225 operating as 1F23, the Great North Eastern Railway (GNER) 04:45 service from Newcastle to London King's Cross with 99 occupants onboard. It consisted of a leading Driving Van Trailer (DVT), nine Mark 4 coaches, and a trailing Class 91 locomotive. The InterCity 225 operates in a push-pull configuration; in normal operations, the DVT is the lead vehicle for southbound services such as this one, remotely controlling the pushing Class 91 locomotive at the rear. The freight train was operating 6G34, the Freightliner 05:00 service from Immingham Docks to Ferrybridge power station. It consisted of a leading Class 66 locomotive, and sixteen fully laden coal wagons.

The car was a Land Rover Defender, which was towing a trailer loaded with a Renault Savanna estate car. It was being driven by 36-year-old Gary Hart on a 145 mi (233 km) journey from his home in Strubby, Lincolnshire, which he left at 04:40, to his work in Wigan.

The accident occurred on a section of the East Coast Main Line. The line speed for this section is 125 mph (201 km/h) and passes under the M62 motorway. In the southbound direction, there is a trailing set of points connecting a freight yard to the Up line.

== Events ==
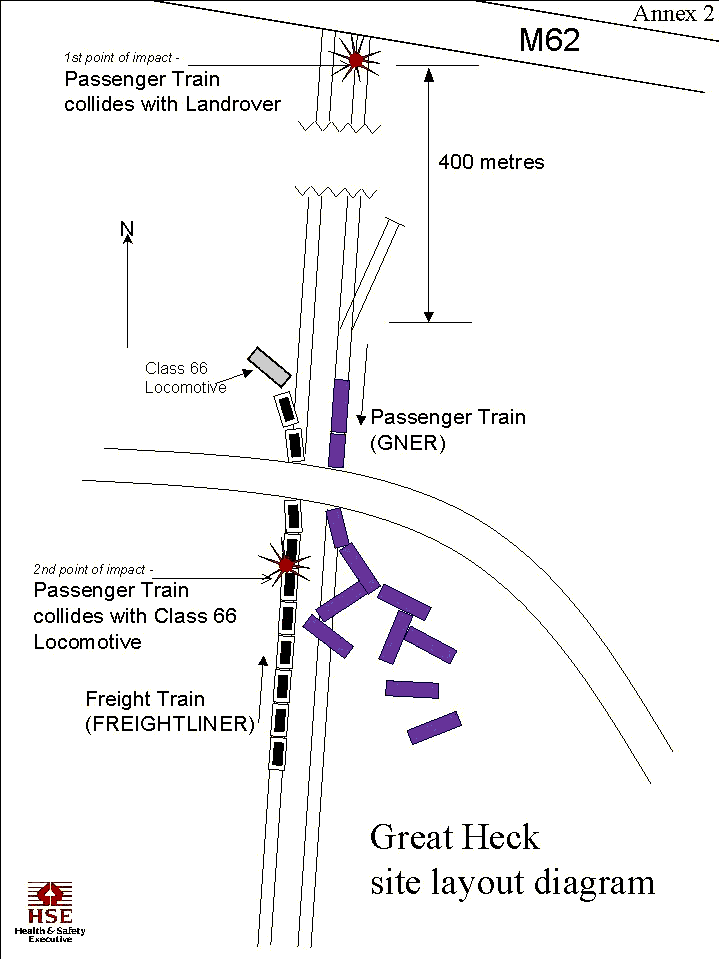
A diagram showing the events of the crash

The accident sequence began at approximately 06:13 on 28 February 2001, when the car left the westbound carriageway of the motorway just before the bridge over the rail line. The vehicle travelled down an embankment and onto the southbound railway track. After a failed attempt to reverse off the track, Hart exited the vehicle and called the emergency services using his mobile telephone. While he was on the phone, the Land Rover was hit by the InterCity 225. The sound of the train's horn and the collision with the car was captured on the call.

After striking the Land Rover, the leading bogie of the DVT derailed, but the train stayed upright. The set of trailing points from the freight yard then deflected it into the path of the oncoming freight train. The freight train and the InterCity 225 collided approximately 2,106 feet (642 m) from the InterCity 225's impact with the Land Rover, resulting in the near-total destruction of the DVT and moderate to severe damage to all nine of the InterCity 225's coaches. Most of the coaches overturned and came to rest down an embankment to the east side of the track, in a field adjacent to the railway line just south of another bridge. The trailing locomotive of the InterCity 225 was derailed but remained upright and suffered only minor damage. The freight locomotive lost its bogies after impact, with debris from the DVT jammed underneath, rupturing its fuel tank. It overturned onto its left side, coming to rest in the garden of a house next to the line, north of the bridge. The first nine wagons following it were derailed and damaged to varying extents. Two wagons that left the line with the freight locomotive flattened a caravan and garage on the grounds of the house all three came to rest in, but stopped short of striking the house itself.

Ten people were killed, including both train drivers, and 82 were injured, all as a result of the collision between the freight train and the InterCity 225. Survivors of the crash included a train driver who was travelling in the cab of the freight train, supervising the experienced driver who was learning a new route.

== Investigation ==
Her Majesty's Railway Inspectorate, part of the Health and Safety Executive (HSE), was notified of the crash at 06:55, and four inspectors arrived at the scene at 09:24. Another four inspectors arrived shortly thereafter. The HSE released an interim report on 6 March 2001. It was conducted with the assistance of several entities, including GNER and Freightliner, the operators of the trains; Railtrack, the owner of the railway infrastructure; both South and North Yorkshire Police, the British Transport Police, and the Highways Agency. Investigators recovered the data recorder of the freight locomotive, but the InterCity 225 had not yet been fitted with one under GNER's rolling programme of installation.

=== Health and Safety Executive report ===
The HSE released their final report into the accident on 4 December 2002. It stated that no defects were found with any of the railway infrastructure that could have contributed to the outcome of the crash, and that the motorway complied with the standards at the time.

At the time of the impact with the car, the InterCity 225 was estimated to have been travelling at a speed of 120–125 mph (193–201 km/h; 54–56 m/s). After the initial collision, the train then slowed to an estimated speed of 88 mph (142 km/h; 39 m/s) prior to the impact with the freight train, which was estimated to have been travelling at 54 mph (87 km/h; 24 m/s). With an estimated closing speed of 142 mph (229 km/h; 63 m/s), the collision between the trains is the highest-speed railway incident that has occurred in the UK.

The HSE report considered the crashworthiness of the trains. The InterCity 225 had 99 occupants at the time, out of a total seating capacity of 544. The DVT suffered major damage, which included the cab being separated from the underframe. This was due to it being more lightweight, and having a lower ride height than the freight locomotive it collided with. 45 of the 52 seriously injured passengers, and all eight fatalities, were travelling in the first five coaches. These coaches were noted for having the most damage, with their survival space reduced due to several impacts. Overall, the report noted that the coaches performed well in the crash, considering the high speeds involved.

The front and right side of the freight locomotive suffered heavy damage as a result of the impact with the DVT. Though the locomotive's body had a robust construction, which meant it only suffered relatively minor structural damage compared to the other vehicles involved in the accident, its design meant that it did not have any energy absorbing features. The report added "Its design does not appear to complement the crashworthy considerations that guide the construction of passenger vehicles that use the same rail network." Some freight wagons impacted the passenger train's coaches, causing extensive damage. This was partially due to the angular design of the wagons, which was also noted in the Southall rail crash investigation.

Overall, the HSE report recommended that further research be conducted on how derailments occur and how the vehicles behave during them. This research should consider several factors, such as vehicle construction and safety features such as obstacle deflectors and bogie retention. It raised concerns relating to the design of freight trains as a whole, and mentioned that future designs should include features such as energy absorption functionality and bogie retention. It also stated that freight vehicles should avoid aggressive corners at possible interfaces with passenger trains in the event of a crash. Tripwires similar to those already used close to airport runways were mentioned as potentially warranting further research. These could detect the incursion of a road vehicle onto railway property, and interface with different train control systems. Although this may not help when a train is already close to the incident, it could provide an early warning to the incursion in other cases.

=== Health and Safety Commission and Highways Agency reports ===
In response to the crash, the Health and Safety Commission (HSC) and Highways Agency (HA) created working groups to look into the risk of incursions onto railway property. The HSC reviewed previous incidents of road vehicles entering railway property other than at level crossings, and the HA reviewed the use of safety barriers on the nearside of major roads. Both groups published their reports on 25 February 2002.

The HSC identified that of the ~50 vehicles that incur onto railway property each year, ~5 are hit by a train. The working group stated that they expected a derailment to occur every one to two years, and that around one in a hundred of these derailments would then involve a collision with another train. They calculated that a similar event on the scale of the Selby rail crash would occur every 300–400 years. This resulted in a risk of ~0.1 deaths per year for occupants in trains, and ~0.4 deaths per year for occupants in road vehicles.

The HSC working group compared the ~0.5 deaths per year previously calculated to the ~600 deaths per year in accidents where road vehicles leave the carriageway in general, and the ~20 deaths per year in general rail accidents. The working group concluded that the risk was tiny in comparison to other road risks, and small in comparison to other rail risks. They stated that considerations should still be made to reduce the rail risk, but that these should not outweigh other projects tackling higher risks to road and rail.

Several methods of reducing risk were considered by the HSC working group. These included publicity campaigns to educate drivers, and tackling vandalism and careless behaviour. The report also included methods for reducing the severity of incursions onto railway property. These included measures in preventing incursions from reaching a point where a line is obstructed, preventing trains from hitting vehicles on the line, and reducing the severity of train collisions if they did occur. Overall, the report made recommendations including enabling and carrying out risk assessments; appropriately responding to those risk assessments; and implementing improvements where necessary.

The HA working group reviewed historical data for road vehicles leaving the carriageway towards the nearside, using police-submitted accident reports. These reports were only completed where injuries occurred, and the working group found that non-fatal accidents were under-reported to the police. From the data, they found that such accidents only accounted for 5% of all road accidents, but for 11% of annual road fatalities. They calculated that around 0.4 vehicles a year would leave a major road to the nearside, and reach a rail line without being stopped by either a safety barrier or hazard. They found that unprotected nearside road hazards carry a higher economic risk than the hazard associated with a vehicle reaching a rail line, mainly due to the much lower likelihood of the latter occurring.

The HA working group found no risk assessment process in place for providing safety barriers at specific sites. A standard did exist for where to place safety barriers. This standard was risk assessed at the design stage. Overall, the HA working group found that the existing standards for the provision of safety barriers were sufficient, but made recommendations including further research to protect against collisions with nearside hazards; further developing risk assessments for providing safety barriers; and improving the collection of accident data, including accidents without any injuries.

=== Department for Transport report ===
The Department for Transport (DfT) released a report in February 2003 outlining steps to manage the risk of future railway incursions by road vehicles, in response to the recommendations in the HSC and HA reports. It stated that all sites where vehicles could enter railway property, such as at bridges and parallel roads (but excluding level crossings) should be given a risk score. Forms and detailed criteria for different types of carriageways, and example cases for specific sites were included, and a mitigation spreadsheet was provided to choose cost-effective methods of reducing risks at identified sites. The spreadsheet calculates the cost-effectiveness of each option, but the report noted that engineers should still use their judgement on the suitability of the options at each site. The DfT has since updated the report in September 2020 with improved guidance for risk assessing a road vehicle striking a bridge, and debris subsequently landing on the railway.

An increase in the score by two points doubles the risk. For example, a score of 90 has around a million times greater risk compared with a score of 50. Mitigations should be considered for sites with a score above 90, and the practicality of mitigations should be considered for scores between 70 and 90.

An excerpt from Form 1a Single carriageway road vehicle incursion risk ranking
Factor	Options	Score
f1 (Note: Score f1 on the basis of the corner of the bridge with the least containment.)	Road Approach Containment: Score 1 for acceptable (safety fence and/or heavily wooded side approaches, buildings or brick wall thicker than 450mm); Score 12 for inadequate (imperfect fencing and/or medium/lightly wooded approaches, 225mm thick brick wall); Score 24 for non-existent (No fencing, or only post and rail/wire, no significant vegetation)	—
f2	Road Alignment (Horizontal): Score 1 for straight road with at least 7.3m carriageway; Score 3 for straight less than 7.3m carriageway or curved at least 7.3m carriageway; Score 7 for curved road less than 7.3m carriageway; Score 10 for reverse curves less than 7.3m carriageway	—
		Total
		—

An excerpt from Form 3 Example mitigation spreadsheet
Measure	Approx cost per item (2002 prices)	Approx max cost (£ per site)	Estimated average effectiveness	Suitable for site (Y/N)	Approx. cost of measure for this site	Estimated effectiveness of measure for this site	cost-effectiveness (b/1000e) measure alone	Selection order	cost-effectiveness of measure given others selected	Cost of selected measures
Low level safety barrier	£100+/linear m	40,000	-95%	Y	15,000	−95%	−16	1		£15,000
High level safety barrier	£500+/linear m	200,000	-95%	Y	15,000	−50%	−30		−1,319	
Rumble strips	£5/lin. m or £25/strip	250	−35%	Y	250	−35%	−1	2		£250
									Total cost of selected measures	£15,250

The Rail Accident Investigation Branch (RAIB) referenced the DfT report in its report into a road vehicle incursion onto railway property in Aspatria, Cumbria in October 2013. In this incident, an unattended vehicle from a side road rolled down a hill, crossed a main road, and broke through a wooden fence surrounding the railway. The vehicle then rolled down a cutting and stopped across two tracks. The RAIB report stated that the DfT report did not take into account how the risk of an incursion from a runaway vehicle travelling downhill from a side road would be combined with the risk from the neighbouring main road. This could lead to the risk at some sites being underestimated. It made a recommendation to the DfT to review and amend its report to make sure that this risk is considered. The DfT reported that it had implemented actions in response to this recommendation. It updated the report in July 2017 to include guidance for risk assessing side roads joining neighbouring roads to the railway.

== Aftermath ==
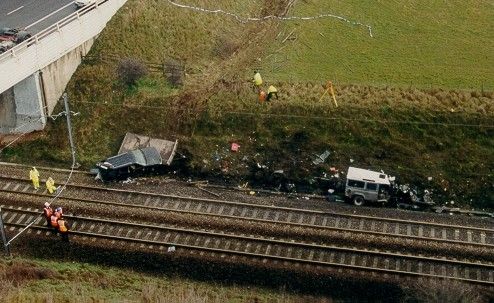
The wreckage of the car and trailer

Hart was tried at Leeds Crown Court on ten counts of causing death by dangerous driving. He pleaded not guilty. The prosecution alleged that Hart had fallen asleep while driving, after having spent five hours the previous night on the phone to a woman he had met through an advert on an internet dating agency. He had been on the phone call from 21:48 to 02:58, and sent text messages between 03:11 and 03:57. He did not get any sleep before leaving his house and starting his journey 90 minutes after the end of the phone call. As part of their investigation, the police tried to replicate the drive, which was 65 miles (105 km) in 70 minutes, an average speed of 56 mph (90 km/h). With a police escort, and after going like a "bat out of hell", they completed the journey with two minutes to spare.

Hart denied the allegations, saying that he did not fall asleep while driving, and he would have pulled over if he was tired. He said that he could go 36 hours without sleep, and that he heard a loud bang before the car left the road, and thought it could have been a puncture. Hart initially told the police on the day of the crash that he had slept for two-and-a-half to three hours that night. However, he later said that he had not slept because he was "buzzing with excitement" ahead of planning to meet the woman later that day, and that he was in shock when he gave his initial account to the police.

Hart was found guilty on 13 December 2001. On 11 January 2002, he was sentenced to five years in prison and given a five-year driving ban after the jury found that he had fallen asleep while driving. He was released from prison in July 2004 after serving half of his sentence, which is normal practice in the United Kingdom for this kind of sentence. An inquest into the deaths of the ten victims opened on 8 September 2003 in Harrogate. On 12 September 2003, the jury decided that all ten people who died in the accident were unlawfully killed.

In total, Hart's insurers, Fortis, who provided him with an unlimited liability third-party fire and theft policy, paid out £30 million as a result of the crash. In October 2003, Fortis was a party in a legal case in the High Court, to try to recover some of the funds it had paid out. They alleged that the safety barrier was too short, and in a statement said that if it had been longer, the crash would not have happened. On 30 October 2003, the judge ruled that negligence on behalf of the Highways Agency had not been established, and that Hart was the precipitating cause of the accident. Fortis held a reinsurance policy, so only had to pay the first £1.5 million themselves, with the remainder being paid by Munich Re, up to the threshold of their reinsurance policy.

=== Memorials ===
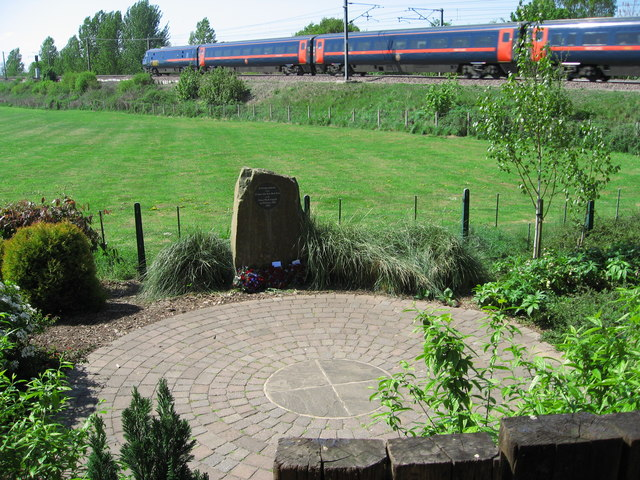
The memorial garden, with the East Coast Main Line in the background, in May 2007

Freightliner named a locomotive "Driver Steve Dunn (George)" in memory of the freight train driver killed in the collision. GNER honoured the InterCity 225's driver, John Weddle, by naming a new driver-training school in his home city of Newcastle upon Tyne after him. On 10 July 2002, in a ceremony attended by members of his family, his 16-year-old daughter Stephanie unveiled a plaque dedicating the school to his memory.

Seventeen books of condolences were created and put out at GNER stations for the public to sign. These were damaged by a flood while in storage, but were later restored and put into a collection by the National Railway Museum. A stone memorial garden was created close to the crash site, with a plaque which was unveiled a year on from the crash, by the first person on scene after the accident.

== See also ==
- List of rail accidents in the United Kingdom
- Nocton rail crash – in similar circumstances, a year to the day after the Selby rail crash
- Ufton Nervet rail crash – a car parked on a level crossing by a suicidal man was struck by an InterCity 125, killing seven people
- Polmont rail accident – a train propelled from the rear by a locomotive struck a cow on the railway
- Oxshott rail crash – a concrete mixer lorry fell from a bridge onto a train
- 2005 Glendale train crash – also involving a car on the track and collisions with other trains

== Sources ==
- Train collision at Great Heck near Selby, 28 February 2001 – HSE interim report (PDF) (Report). Health and Safety Executive. March 2001 – via Railways Archive.
- The track obstruction by a road vehicle and subsequent train collisions at Great Heck 28 February 2001 (PDF) (Report). Health and Safety Executive. February 2002. ISBN 0-7176-2163-4 – via Railways Archive.
- Obstruction of the railway by road vehicles - Report of the Working Group set up by the Health and Safety Commission (PDF) (Report). Health and Safety Commission. February 2002. ISBN 0-7176-2294-0 – via Railways Archive.
- Report of the Highways Agency Working Group to Review the Standards for the Provision of Nearside Safety Fences on Major Roads (Report). Highways Agency. February 2002. Archived from the original on 8 April 2002.
- Managing the accidental obstruction of the railway by road vehicles (PDF) (Report). Department for Transport. February 2003 – via Railways Archive.
- Road vehicle incursion onto the railway at Aspatria, Cumbria – 26 October 2013 (PDF) (Report). Rail Accident Investigation Branch. June 2014.
- Recommendation(s) Status: Road vehicle incursion onto the railway at Aspatria, Cumbria, 26 October 13 (PDF) (Report). Rail Accident Investigation Branch. 17 April 2018.
