= Ferry Bridge, Brotherton =

Historic bridge in West Yorkshire, England

Coordinates: 53.7159°N 1.2695°W

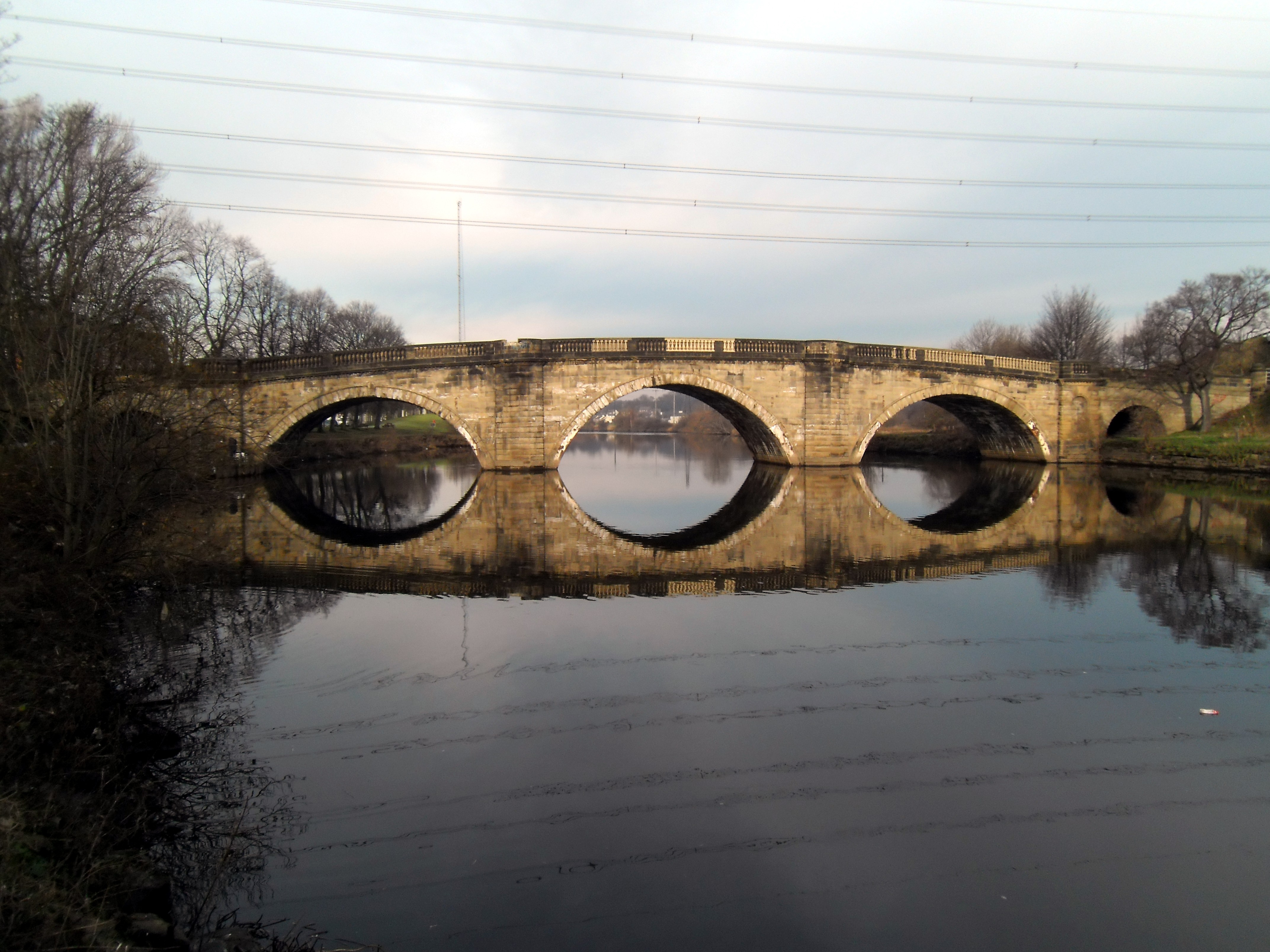
The bridge, in 2012

Ferry Bridge is a historic bridge, connecting Ferrybridge in West Yorkshire with Brotherton in North Yorkshire, in England.

There may have been a bridge over the River Aire at this location in the Anglo-Saxon period, which has been supposed to have been destroyed in 1070. The first bridge known definitely to have existed was built in the late 12th century, but it collapsed in 1228, killing a group of Crusaders who were crossing. That year, pontage was granted, a toll for crossing the bridge, to fund repairs.

A replacement bridge was built in about 1290, with a bridge chapel completed by 1306. In 1461, during the War of the Roses, the Lancastrian Army partly destroyed the bridge, but the Yorkist Army was still able to cross, on its way to the Battle of Towton. The bridge was restored, and it was described by John Leland in 1538 as being built of stone and having seven or eight arches. Four small arches at its north end took the road across swampy ground. This route became part of the Great North Road in the early Georgian period, with coaching inns established on each riverbank. The bridge was Grade I listed in 1967.

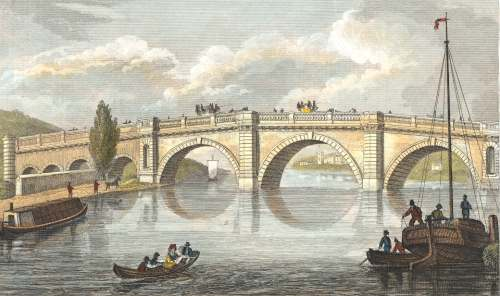
Engraving of the bridge from around 1850

The bridge was damaged by storms in 1795, and in 1797 John Carr of York designed a replacement, on a new alignment. Bernard Hartley constructed the bridge, which was completed in 1804. It is carried by eight round-headed arches: three to cross the river, four over land on the Ferrybridge side, and one over land on the Brotherton side. The piers have cutwaters and the bridge has a parapet, with refuges over each pier, and a vase balustrade in the central section.

== See also ==
- Grade I listed buildings in North Yorkshire (district)
- Listed buildings in Brotherton
