= Osgoldcross Wapentake =

Coordinates: 53.744°N 1.310°W

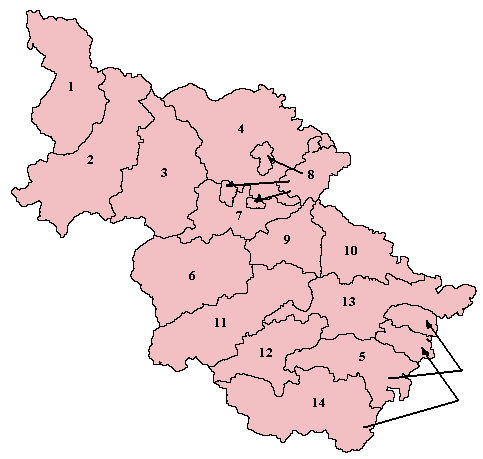
Wapentakes of the West Riding. Osgoldcross is labelled 13 on the map.

Osgoldcross was a wapentake of the West Riding of Yorkshire, England. It included the parishes of Adlingfleet, Badsworth, Burghwallis, Campsall, Castleford, Darrington, Kellington, South Kirkby, Owston, Pontefract, Whitgift, Womersley, Ferry Fryston and parts of Featherstone, Snaith and Wragby.

The original meeting place of the wapentake was the area which later became Pontefract Market Place.
