= Kellingley Colliery =

Former coal mine in North Yorkshire, England (1965–2015)

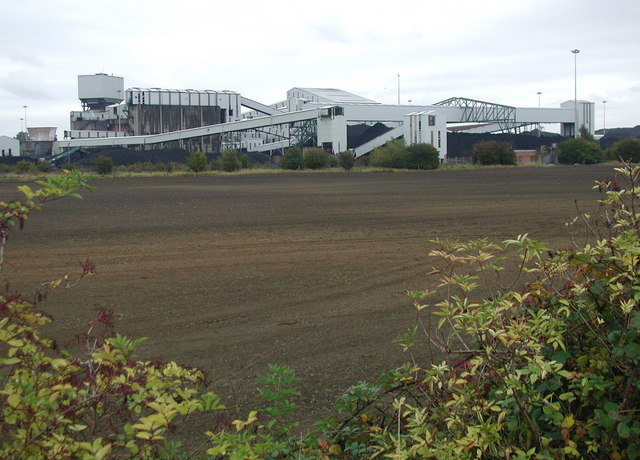
- Kellingley Colliery

- Location in North Yorkshire
- Location: Beal, North Yorkshire, Selby, England; 53°42′19″N 1°12′24″W
- Products: Coal
- Opened: 1965
- Closed: 2015
- Company: UK Coal
- Acquired: 1994

Kellingley Colliery, known affectionately as the 'Big K', was a deep coal mine in North Yorkshire, England, 3.6 miles (5.8 km) east of Ferrybridge power station. It was owned and operated by UK Coal.

The colliery closed on 18 December 2015, marking the end of deep-pit coal mining in Britain. The site is earmarked for commercial development.

== History ==
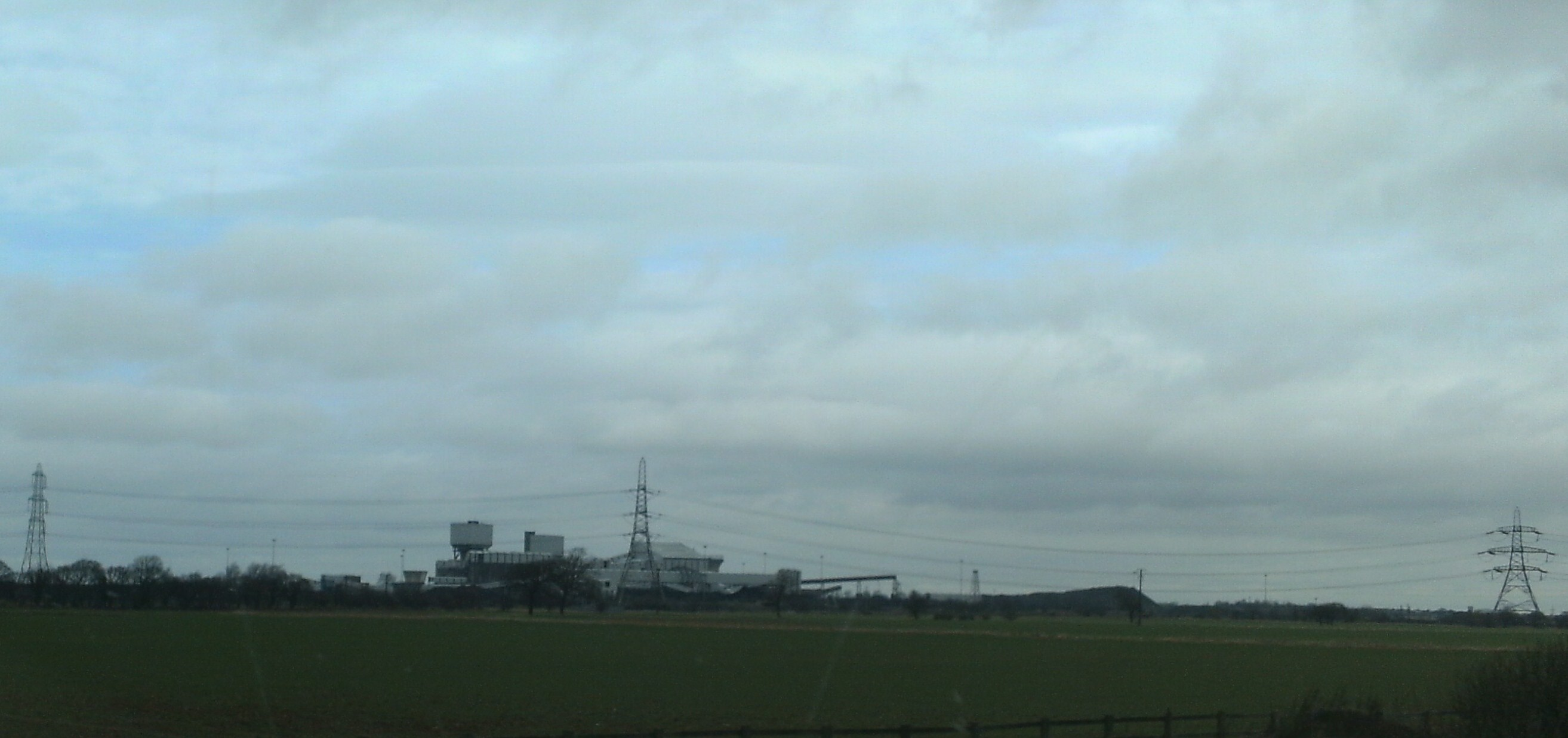
Kellingley Colliery from the M62

Exploratory boreholes sunk in the 1950s established that there were up to seven workable seams of coal at Kellingley. The sinking of its two shafts started in 1960. Its sandy and porous geology down to about 600 feet (180 m) was waterlogged. Boreholes drilled around each shaft position had sub-zero-temperature brine pumped through them to freeze the ground down to about 640 feet (200 m). The sinking personnel had to work in sub-zero temperatures until the shafts were below this frozen ground. The shafts were eventually sunk to a depth of around 870 yards (800 m).

After a concrete lining sealed the shafts, the cooling brine was stopped and the frozen ground allowed to thaw. Grout, a thin cement mixture, was pumped at high pressure through holes bored through the shaft's concrete lining into the water-bearing strata. When it set, most of the water leaking into the shafts was stopped and the ground around the upper part of the shafts was stabilised.

The pressure needed to pump in the mixture caused the ground above to heave, causing the winding engine towers mounted above the shafts to tilt slightly. This had been anticipated and provision had been made to jack up the four legs that each tower stood on. The procedure was done regularly during the pumping phase to bring the towers into alignment. To keep the shafts to the correct alignment, plumb lines were used. Four steel lines, evenly spaced, were suspended around the inside of each shaft, all the way to the bottom.

The colliery began production in April 1965. During planning and building the surface infrastructure for the new colliery, employment of 3,000 mineworkers was expected at completion. Because of updated methods and machinery, only about 2,000 men were employed there at any one time. Many of the miners relocated from Scotland to work at the colliery, having lost their jobs at Scottish pits that closed in the 1960s. In March 2004, the pit received £7.2 million from the Coal Investment Aid Scheme.

== Operations ==
Kellingley’s two main shafts were each almost 870 yards (800 m) deep. One was used to move men and materials, and the second to move coal from the Beeston seam, at a rate of up to 900 tonnes an hour. Kellingley primarily supplied local power stations. It also produced some housecoal-quality coal: larger-sized coals of higher calorific value.

The Beeston seam was accessed after a £55 million investment programme undertaken by UK Coal. It was expected to extend the life of the colliery until at least 2015. Coal reserves accessible in the Silkstone seam were anticipated to extend its life to 2019.

Miners took part in the 1984 miners' strike, although there was a higher number opposed to the strike at Kellingley than in most other pits in Yorkshire. A miner from Kellingley, Joe Green, was killed after being hit by a lorry on 15 June 1984. A sit-in was held by 200 striking men on 26 September 1984. From January 1985 onwards, some miners returned to work, with the first coal since the strike began produced on 8 January 1985, and the strike formally ended on 3 March 1985.

In 1990 and 1991, the proposed extension to the colliery necessitated the excavation and underpinning of the nearby Church of St Edmund King and Martyr, Kellington. The church tower was dismantled, and rebuilt after the underpinning was completed.

From March to June 2004, workers took sporadic strike action.

== Accidents ==
On 30 September 2008 miner Don Cook died in a rock fall. Miner Ian Cameron died after equipment fell on him on 18 October 2009.

On 30 November 2010, 200 workers were evacuated from the pit following a methane explosion underground. On 27 September 2011, Gerry Gibson was killed and another miner injured after an underground roof collapse.

As of 31 October 2015, 17 people were listed on the memorial to those who died during the operation of the mine.

== Closure ==
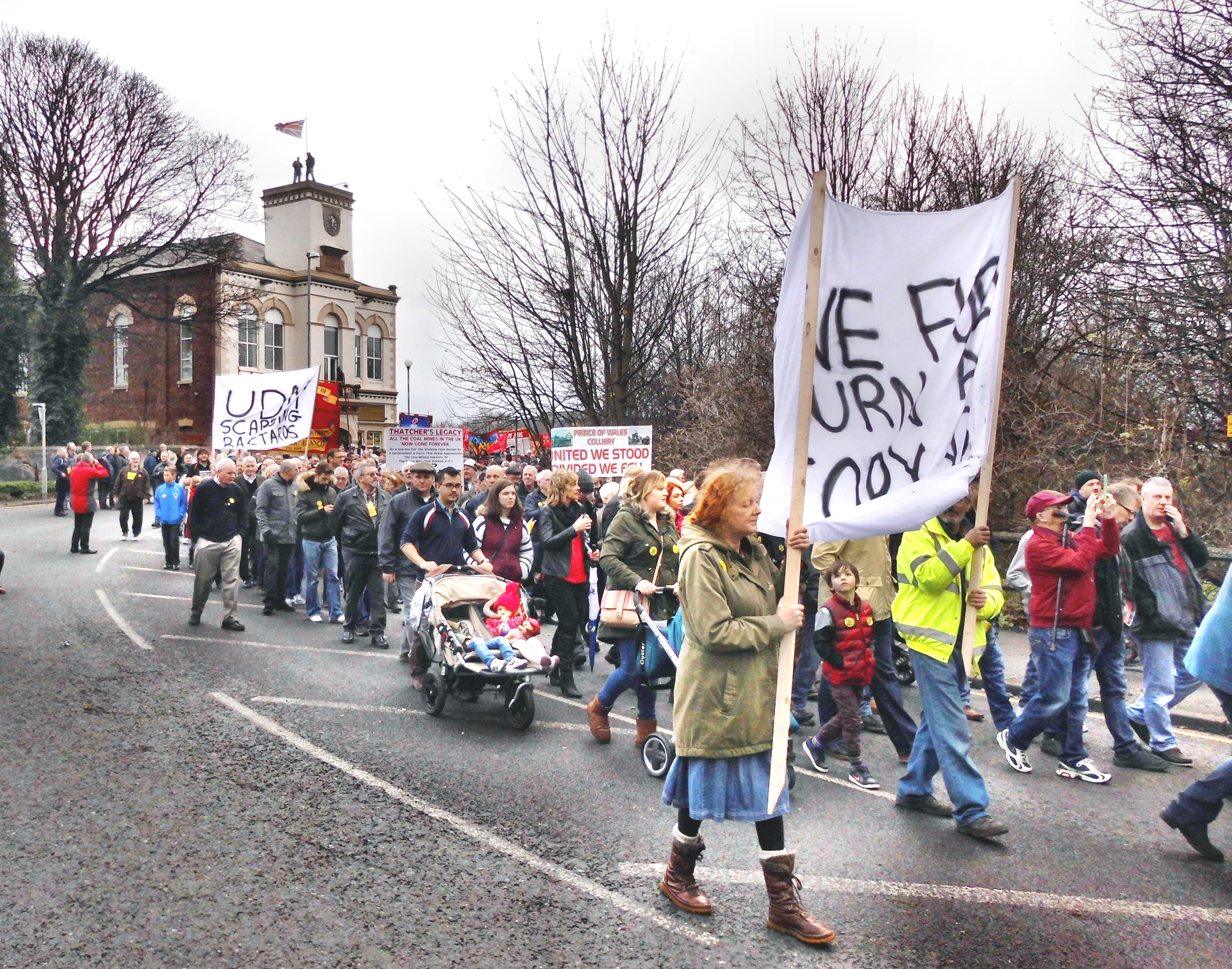
The march to mark the closure

Kellingley Colliery closed on 18 December 2015, marking the end of deep mining in the United Kingdom. UK Coal had first proposed its extension by three years, alongside a similar extension to the life of Thoresby Colliery in Nottinghamshire, which closed in July 2015, but business minister Matthew Hancock argued that the £338 million said to be required for this plan "does not represent value for money".

With the closure of Kellingley, the company made 450 miners redundant. Energy minister, Andrea Leadsom, said all miners at Kellingley would receive from UK Coal "the same severance package as miners at Thoresby".

The shafts of the colliery were emptied of cables and ropes and then filled with a concrete block about 10 metres deep. Demolition started on the surface buildings and the site was levelled out before ownership is transferred to Harworth Estates for future redevelopment.

On Saturday 19 December 2015, thousands of people turned out for a march in Yorkshire to commemorate the end of deep coal mining in the UK and, specifically, Kellingley's last shift the day before. Starting at Knottingley Town Hall the last miners, their families and many former miners marched to the Social Club.

In late-November 2016, a two-part television programme based on the last weeks of the colliery was broadcast with the name The Last Miners.

== Site redevelopment ==
The site is intended for future phased development over a 10-year plan into commercial units to nurture employment opportunities.

== See also ==
- List of collieries in Yorkshire (1984–2015)
