= Ferrybridge =

Village in West Yorkshire, England

Coordinates: 53.714°N 1.281°W

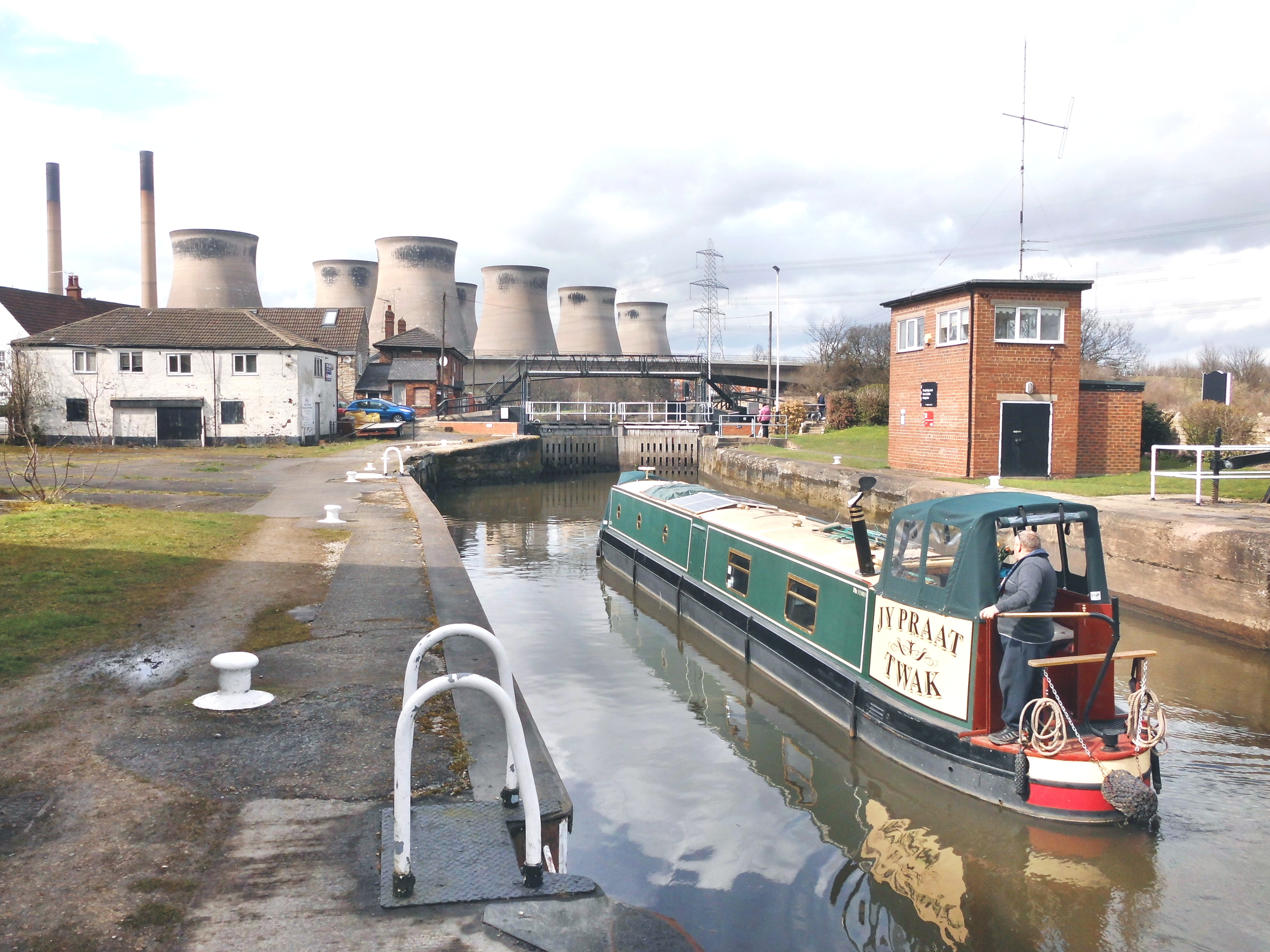
- Ferrybridge Locks

- Location within West Yorkshire
- Population: 1,491 (2001)
- OS grid reference: SE475245
- Metropolitan borough: City of Wakefield
- Metropolitan county: West Yorkshire
- Region: Yorkshire and the Humber
- Country: England
- Sovereign state: United Kingdom
- Post town: KNOTTINGLEY
- Postcode district: WF11
- Dialling code: 01977
- Police: West Yorkshire
- Fire: West Yorkshire
- Ambulance: Yorkshire
- UK Parliament: Normanton, Pontefract and Castleford

Ferrybridge is a village in West Yorkshire, England. Ferrybridge lies at a historically important crossing of the River Aire which borders the North Yorkshire village of Brotherton. It is linked to other communities by the A1, which follows the route of the Great North Road. The village falls within the Knottingley ward of Wakefield City Council.

The origin of the place-name is from Old Norse and means bridge by the ferry. It appears as Ferie in the Domesday Book of 1086 and as Ferybrig in 1198.

== Geography and geology ==
Geologically, Ferrybridge and Knottingley are located on rich soil, over a bed of Magnesian Limestone.

The area is close to junctions of the M62 and A1(M) motorways, as well as junctions on the rail network, which runs northward to York, south to Pontefract (and Rotherham), west to both Wakefield and Leeds, east to Goole, and south-east to the East Coast Main Line. The River Aire meets the Aire and Calder navigation close to the east of the town.

The area is famous for the Ferrybridge power stations and the M62 services which offers eateries and lodging.

The Ferrybridge power stations to the north dominated the skyline around the village prior to their demolition.

=== The village ===
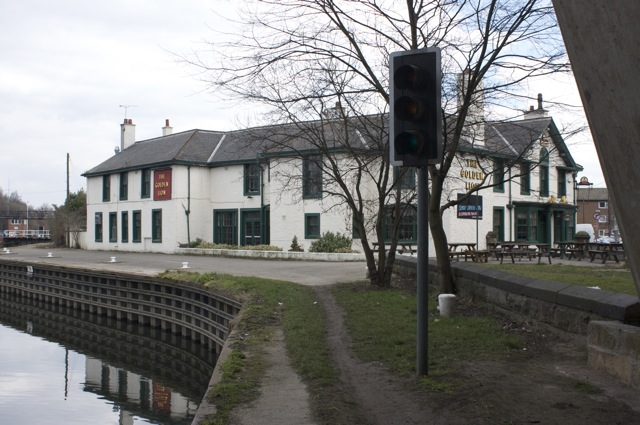
The Golden Lion Pub

The village has two public houses, "The Golden Lion", which sits by Ferrybridge lock and is steeped in colourful history during its time as a coaching inn, and "The Magnet Inn".

The village has two primary schools, one of which is in the top 250 schools in the country: the Vale Academy was described as "outstanding" in a 2013 Ofsted report. The other is Willow Green Academy, previously known as Roundhill Junior School and Ferrybridge Infant School.

== History ==
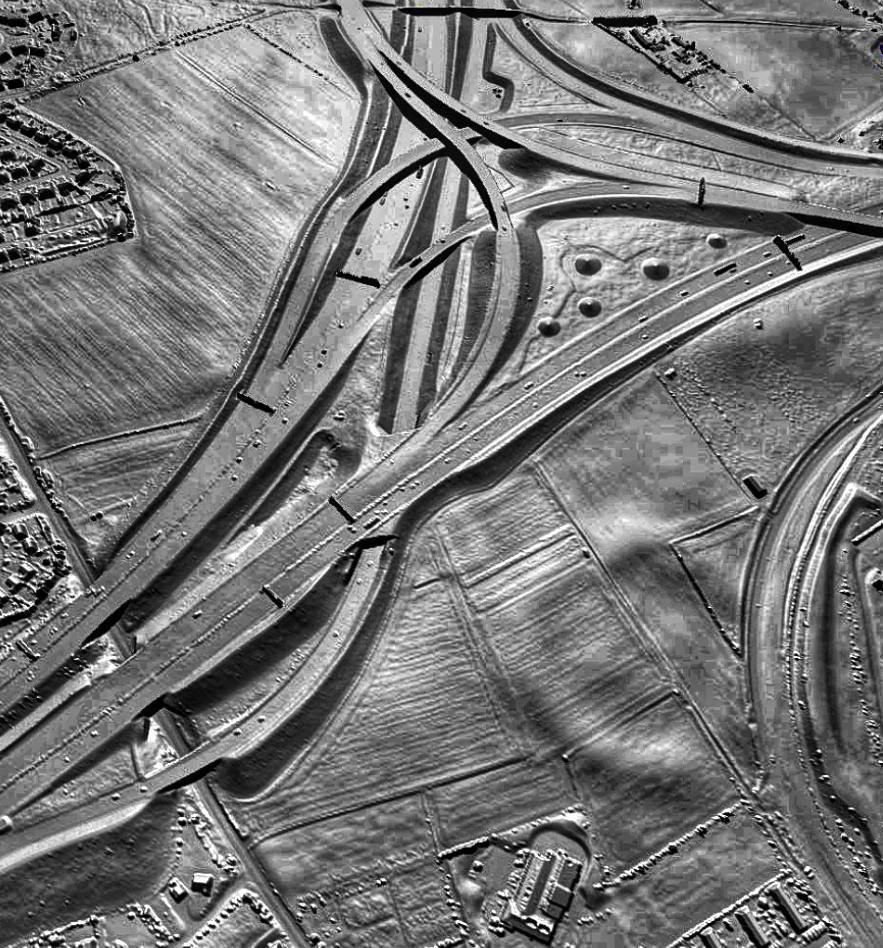
A lidar view of Ferrybridge Henge

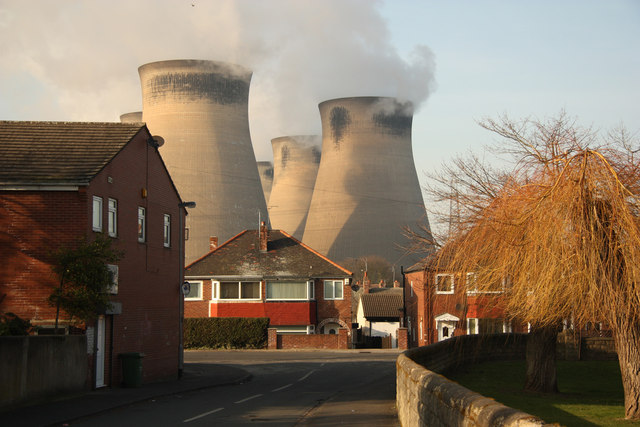
Housing in Ferrybridge

An archaeological feature at Ferrybridge is Ferrybridge Henge, a prehistoric ceremonial monument dating back to the Neolithic period, constructed during the period 4,500-1,500 BC, additionally a 2,400-year-old chariot burial has been discovered in the area.

The history of Ferrybridge - and its neighbour, Knottingley - dates back to the establishment of Anglo-Saxon settlements along this stretch of the river. The respective histories of the two settlements of Ferrybridge and Knottingley are closely linked, bringing glassmaking, shipbuilding, brewing and potteries to the area.

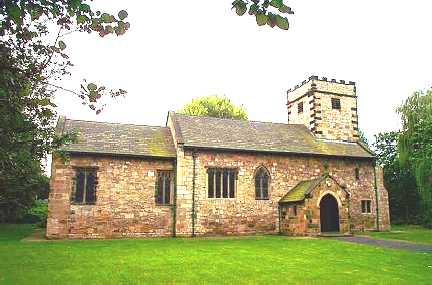
St Andrew's Church, Ferrybridge

Ferrybridge stands where the Great North Road crosses the River Aire. Ferry Bridge is a Grade I listed building, and was designed by John Carr of York in 1797 and built by Bernard Hartley of Pontefract in 1804. Until 1810, a toll was payable to cross the bridge.

In March 1461, on the eve of the battle of nearby Towton, an engagement between the Lancastrians and Yorkists ended in a Lancastrian victory, and Lord Fitzwalter, the Yorkist leader was killed. This is known as the Battle of Ferrybridge.

Up to the end of the 17th century, Knottingley was an important inland port in the West Riding as the River Aire was not navigable beyond it. The construction of the Aire and Calder Navigation Canal (by the Aire and Calder Navigation Act 1698 (10 Will. 3. c. 25) in 1699; the first navigation scheme authorised by an act of Parliament) diminished Knottingley's importance as a port by allowing barges on the river to navigate further upstream to Leeds.

Parliament authorized a new canal in 1820. Cutting through the centre of Knottingley, the new Aire and Calder Navigation Canal was opened in 1826 and connected the new port of Goole with the River Aire at Ferrybridge. The lock at Ferrybridge opened at 10 a.m. on 20 July 1826.

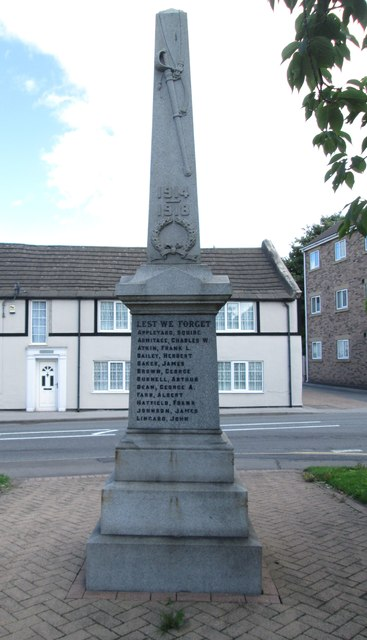
The War Memorial, Ferrybridge

By the end of the Industrial Revolution, Ferrybridge had become a centre for glass production. The Ferrybridge railway station opened in 1882 on the Swinton and Knottingley Joint Railway (1879) and closed in 1965.

In the 20th century, three power stations were built, all on the same site—Ferrybridge A in 1926–1927, Ferrybridge B in 1957–1959, and Ferrybridge C in 1961–1968. Three of Ferrybridge C's cooling towers collapsed during construction in high winds in 1965. A fourth natural gas power station was expected to be built but because of soaring gas prices this did not go ahead.

== See also ==
- Listed buildings in Knottingley and Ferrybridge
- Kellingley Colliery, situated at the other side of Knottingley, West Yorkshire's last operational colliery.
