= Selby Almshouses =

Building in Selby, North Yorkshire, England

Coordinates: 53°46′56″N 1°04′33″W

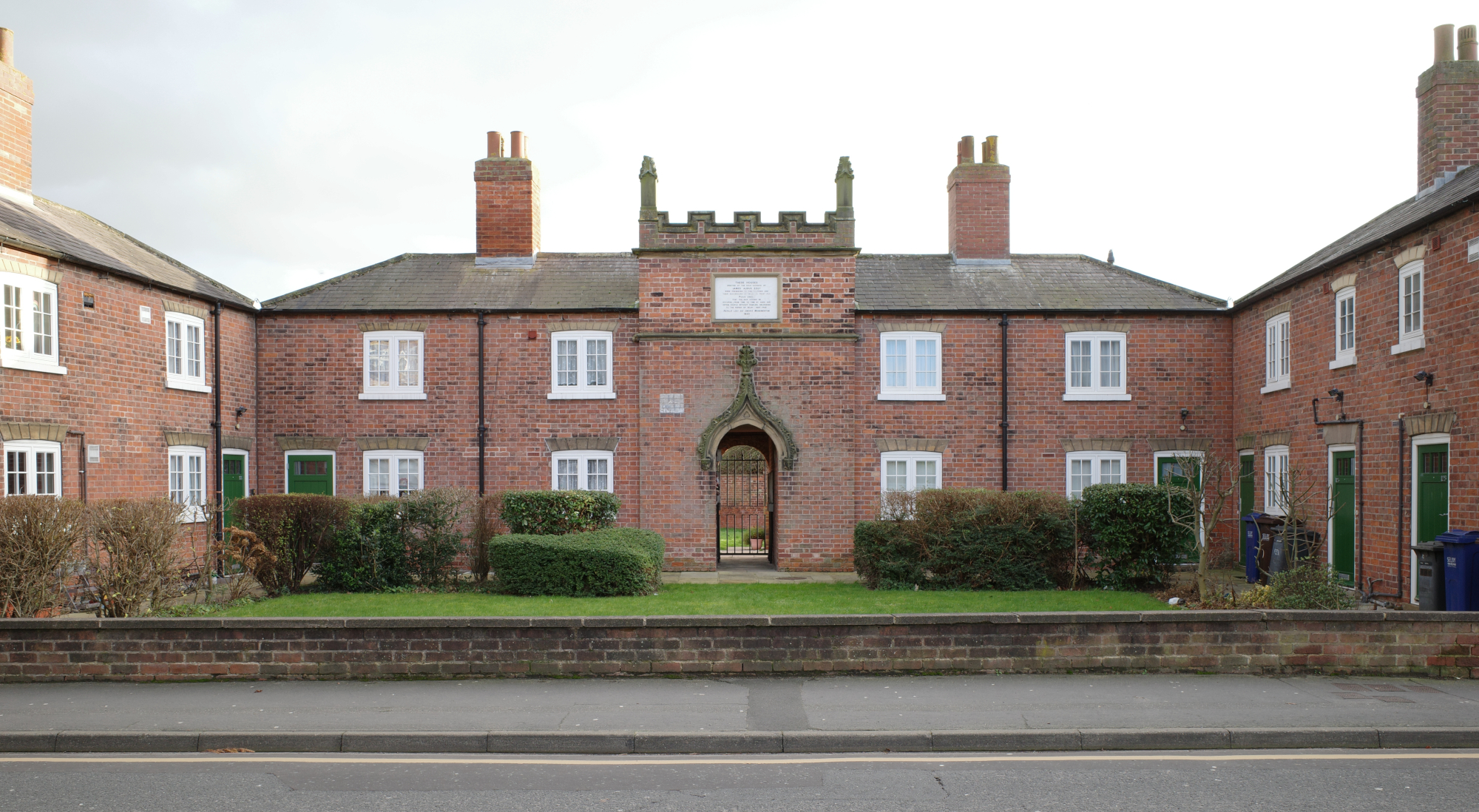
The building, in 2023

Selby Almshouses are a historic building in Selby, a town in North Yorkshire, in England.

The building, comprising ten houses in three ranges around a courtyard, was constructed to house poor widows or elderly people. They were designed and funded by James Audus and were completed in 1833. The building was grade II listed in 1980, and is now run by the Audus charity.

The almshouses are built of brown brick with hipped slate roofs. They have two storeys, three bays on the east side, and four on the west and south sides. The windows are casements with channelled voussoirs. In the middle of the south range is a low tower with an embattled parapet and crocketed corner pinnacles. It contains an entrance with a pointed head, a moulded surround, a crocketed ogee head, and an elaborate finial. Above the entrance is an inscribed and dated plaque.

== See also ==
- Listed buildings in Selby
