= Selby Museum Hall =

Building in Selby, North Yorkshire, England

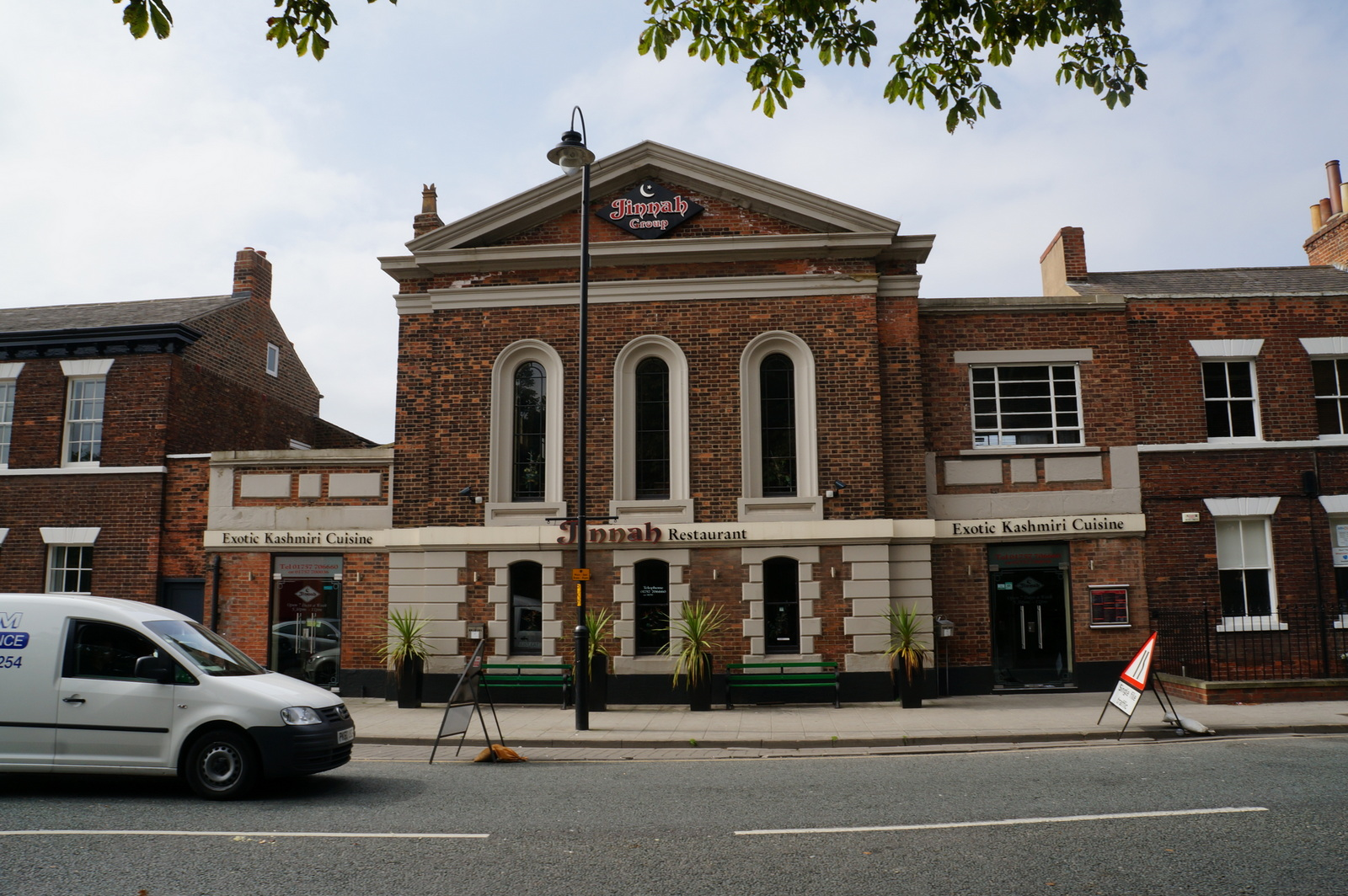
The building, in 2013

Selby Museum Hall is a historic building in Selby, a town in North Yorkshire, in England.

The building was constructed on Park Street in 1839, as the Public Rooms. In 1861, it was converted to become the town's mechanics' institute, then around the end of the century, Jonathan Hutchinson established a museum in the building. This operated until the 1970s, when the newly-formed Selby District Council decided not to fund the institution. It closed, and its contents were redistributed to other museums. The building became a Salvation Army citadel, then in 2008 was converted into a restaurant, part of the Jinnah chain. The building has been grade II listed since 1968.

The building is constructed of brown brick with stucco dressings, rusticated quoins on the ground floor, a floor band, and a pediment. There are two storeys and three bays. The ground floor contains segmental-headed sash windows with rusticated surrounds, and on the upper floor are tall round-headed windows with moulded surrounds and panelled aprons.

== See also ==
- Listed buildings in Selby
