= The George Inn, Selby =

Hotel in Selby, North Yorkshire, England

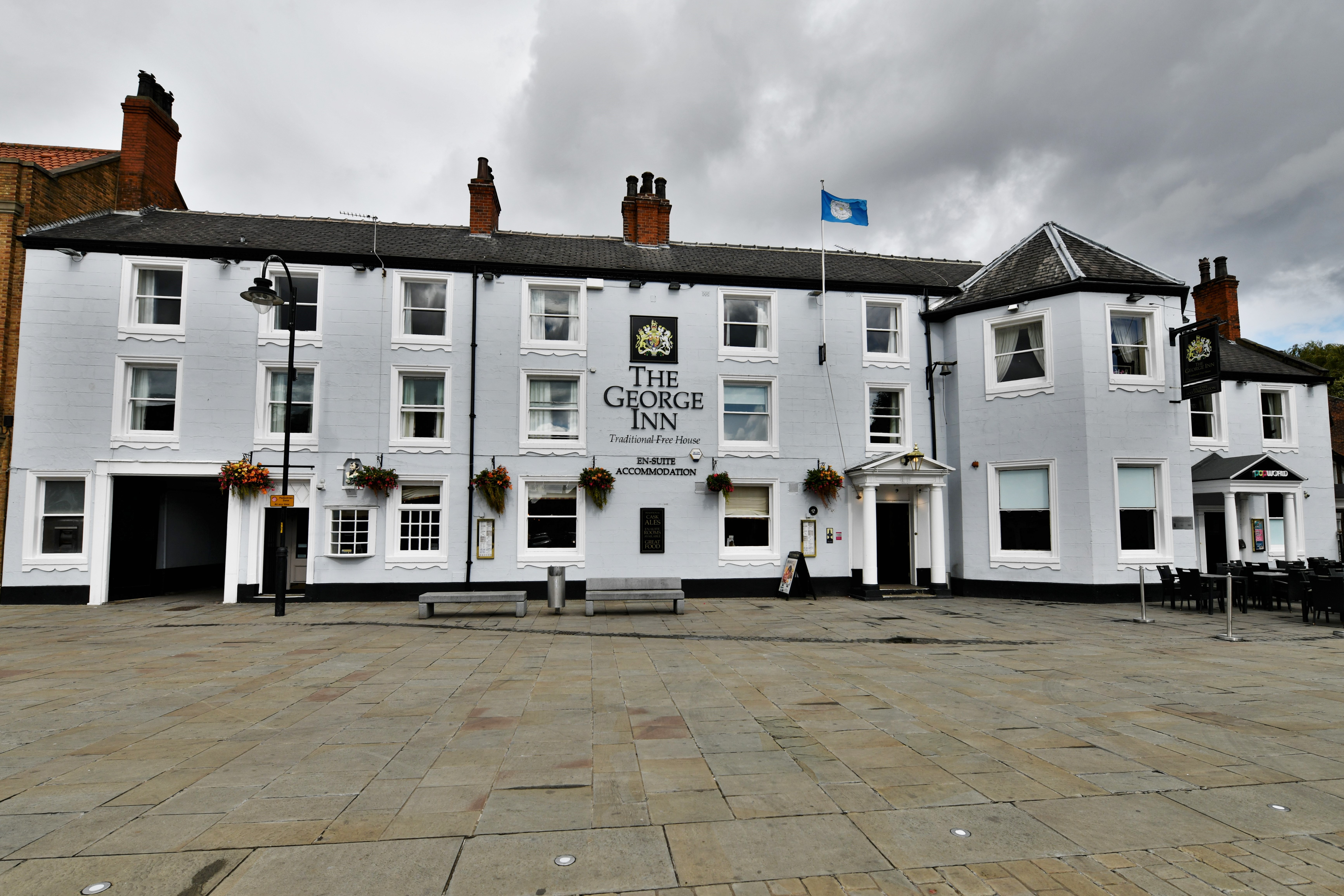
The pub, in 2018

The George Inn is a historic hotel in Selby, a town in North Yorkshire, in England.

The hotel was constructed in the mid 18th century, on the town's Market Place. It was altered in the early 19th century, when it was externally altered to fit the style of the time. In 1896, the decision to found the British Mycological Society was taken at a meeting at the hotel. The building was grade II listed in 1968. It was long known as the Londesborough Hotel, but in 2017, the Stonegate Pub Company renamed it after the George Washington Window in Selby Abbey in an attempt to appeal to American tourists.

The hotel is stuccoed, and has a modillion eaves cornice and a slate roof. There are three storeys and eleven bays, the right three bays projecting and canted. On the front is a porch with Tuscan columns and pilasters, and a pediment. In the left bay is a carriage entrance, and the windows are sashes with moulded architraves. Inside, there is an early staircase, and a chimneypiece made of marble.

== See also ==
- Listed buildings in Selby
