= Abbot's Staith =

Historic building in Selby, England

Coordinates: 53°47′09″N 1°04′00″W

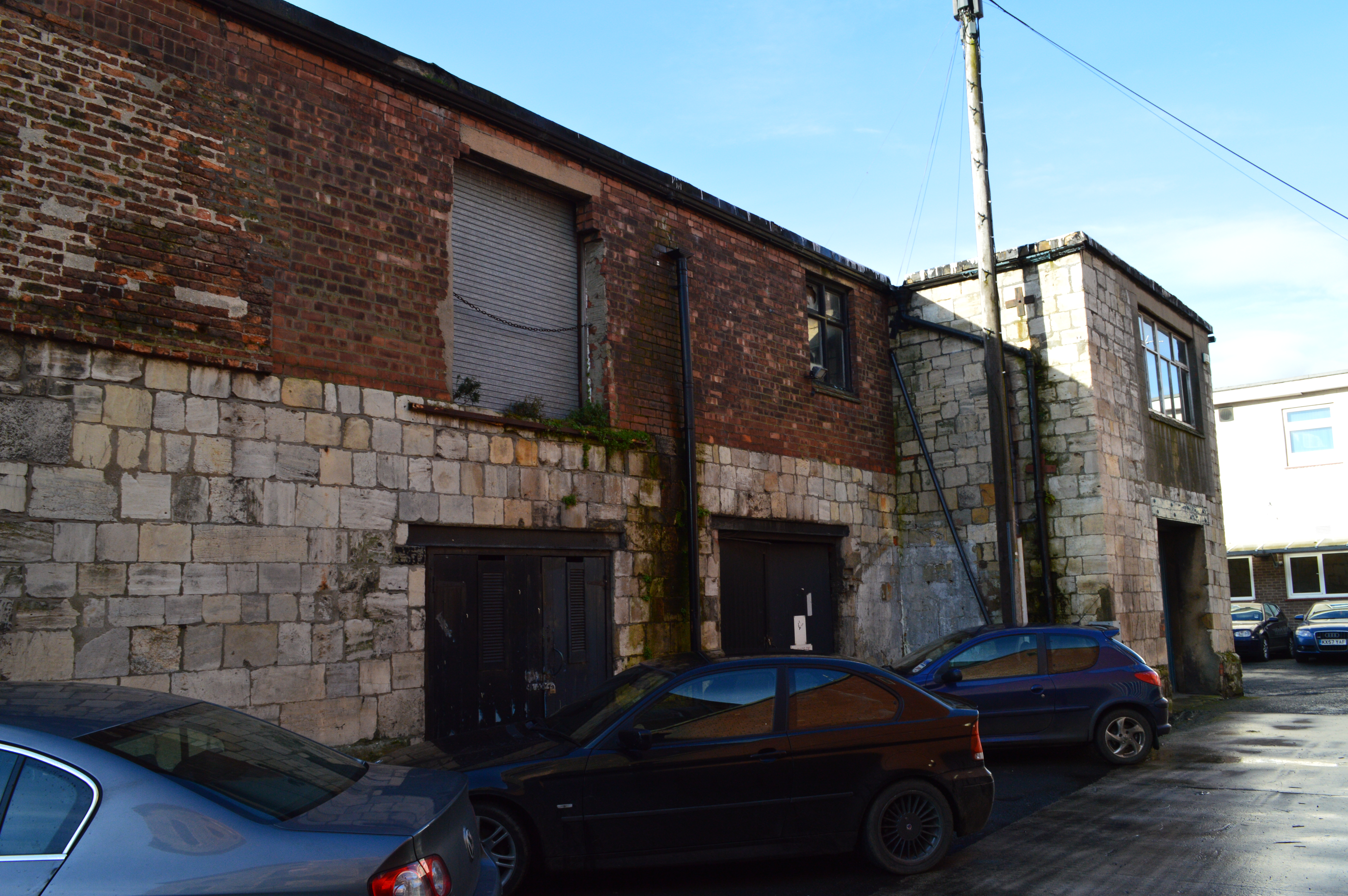
The building, in 2014

Abbot's Staith is a historic building in Selby, a town in North Yorkshire in England.

The building was constructed in about 1500, probably as a warehouse. It is generally thought to have been constructed on behalf of the monks of Selby Abbey. The Oxford Handbook of Later Medieval Archaeology in Britain describes it as "Selby Abbey's quay and timber yard". Writing in the 1750s, Richard Pocock stated that "near the river is a large store house of hewn stone, which served for their cloth before the Aire was made navigable". In 1911, the building was purchased by the Woodhead family, which used it for their seed business. However, it was disused from about 1990, and fell into poor repair. In 2015, the Save the Abbot's Staith group began fundraising to restore the building, for community use. In 2019, Historic England supported the cost of roof repairs.

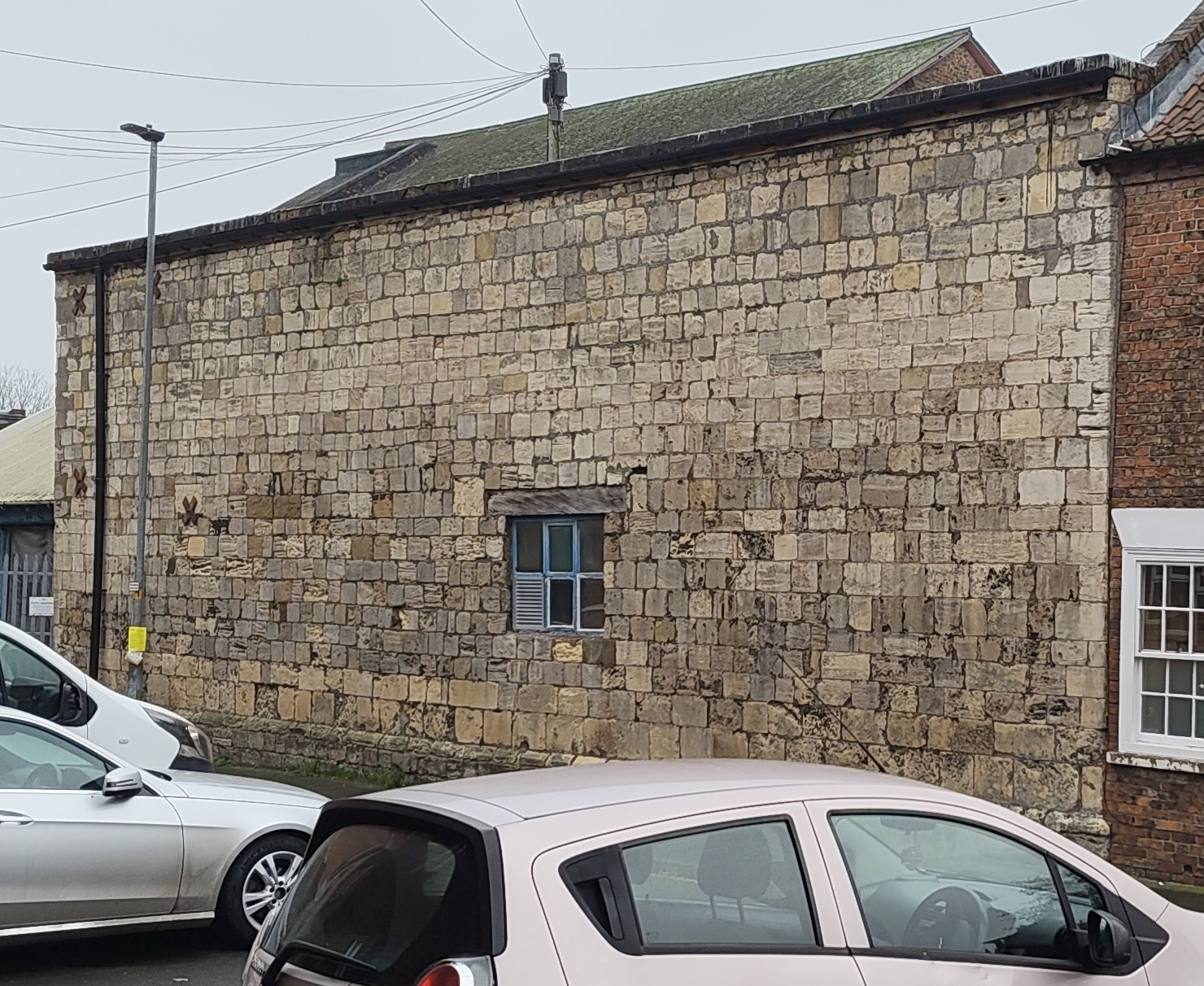
Northwest wall

The building is two storeys high, H-shaped in plan, and is largely built of limestone. The north side of the upper storey of the central section was rebuilt in brick in about 1700, possibly replacing timber-framing. The southern side of the upper storey of the east wing was rebuilt in brick in the 19th century. Five first floor windows on the south side are original, as are two doors on the north side, with their original ironwork. Inside, the building is divided by thick stone walls.

The building is grade II* listed and is also a scheduled monument.

== See also ==
- Grade II* listed buildings in North Yorkshire (district)
- Listed buildings in Selby
