= St James' Church, Selby =

Church in Selby, North Yorkshire, England

Coordinates: 53°46′57″N 1°04′17″W

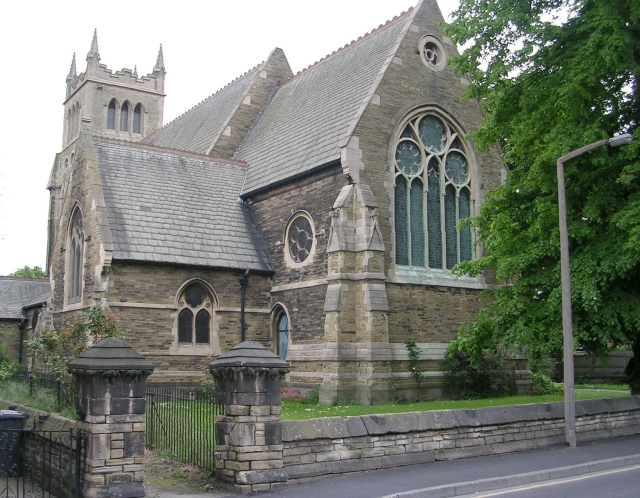
The church, in 2009

St James' Church is a parish church in Selby, a town in North Yorkshire, in England.

The church was paid for by James Audus. He may have had a role in its design, which is also ascribed to Newstead and Low. It was completed in December 1867, and was given its own parish later in the month. In May 1944, a Handley Page Halifax crashed into the spire, the crew and eight people in nearby houses being killed. The tower was rebuilt, but the spire was not. The building was grade II listed in 1980.

The church is built of stone and has a slate roof with tile cresting. It consists of a nave with a clerestory, north and south aisles, north and south porches, north and south transepts, a chancel with a vestry, and a west tower. The tower has five stages, buttresses, string courses, an arcade of four pointed arches in the fourth stage with circular windows above, three-light bell openings, and a stepped embattled parapet with corner crocketed pinnacles. Inside, there is a wood and brass lectern described by Historic England as "exceptional", a marble reredos, extensive 19th-century woodwork, and an iron communion rail.

== See also ==
- Listed buildings in Selby
