= Jack Byers =

English footballer

Personal information
- Full name: John Edwin Byers
- Date of birth: 1897
- Place of birth: Selby, England
- Date of death: 1931 (aged 33–34)
- Height: 5 ft 8 in (1.73 m)
- Position: Outside left

Senior career*
Years	Team	Apps	(Gls)
- Knaresborough
–1921	Selby Town		
1921–1922	Huddersfield Town	12	(4)
1922–1923	Blackburn Rovers	27	(2)
1923–1928	West Bromwich Albion	104	(11)
1928–1929	Worcester City		
1929	Torquay United	0	(0)
- Kidderminster Harriers
- * Club domestic league appearances and goals

John Edwin Byers (1897–1931) was a professional footballer who played for Selby Town, Huddersfield Town, Blackburn Rovers, West Bromwich Albion, Worcester City, Torquay United and Kidderminster Harriers.
