= Selby Market Cross =

Structure in Selby, North Yorkshire, England

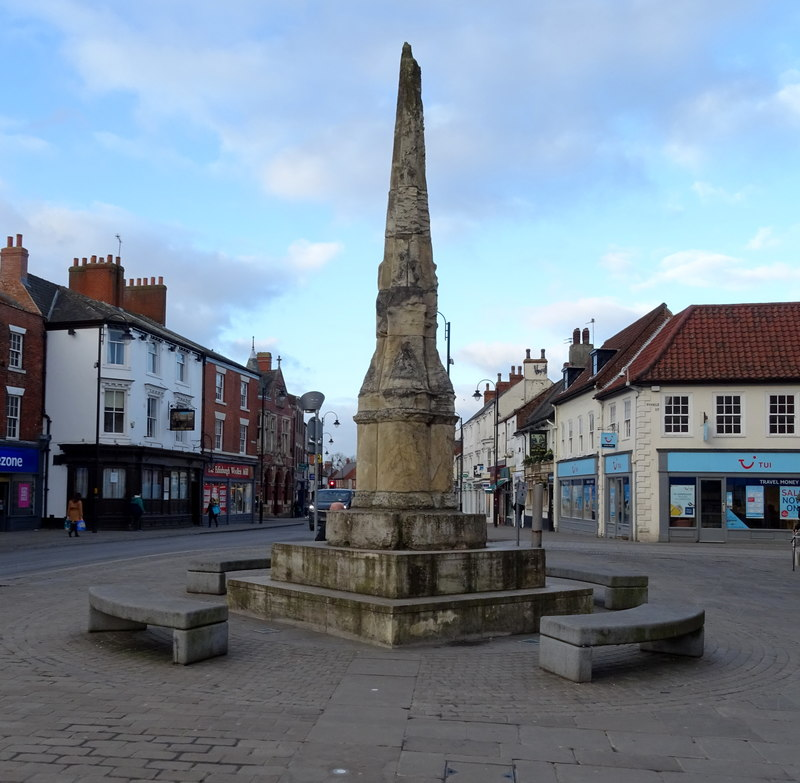
The structure, in 2020

Selby Market Cross is a historic structure in Selby, a town in North Yorkshire, in England.

Selby received a market charter in 1324, and a market grew up in front of Selby Abbey. A market cross was erected in the Mediaeval period, but was demolished in or before the late 18th century. The current cross was erected as a replacement, probably around 1790, although a modern plaque on it states that it was erected in 1775. The work was funded by Robert Petre, 9th Baron Petre. The structure was grade II listed in 1952. However, it became seen as an obstacle to motor vehicles, and in 1968, it was dismantled, and re-erected in Selby Park. In 1986, it was returned to the Market Square, about 59 feet (18 m) to the east of its original location, and was placed on a new stone plinth.

The market cross is constructed of stone, and stands on three square steps. The pedestal, on a shallow plinth, has a quatrefoil plan, and above it is an octagonal tapering shaft. This contains eroded gables and gargoyles, and ends in an eroded top.

== See also ==
- Listed buildings in Selby
