= The Crescent, Selby =

Street in Selby, North Yorkshire, England

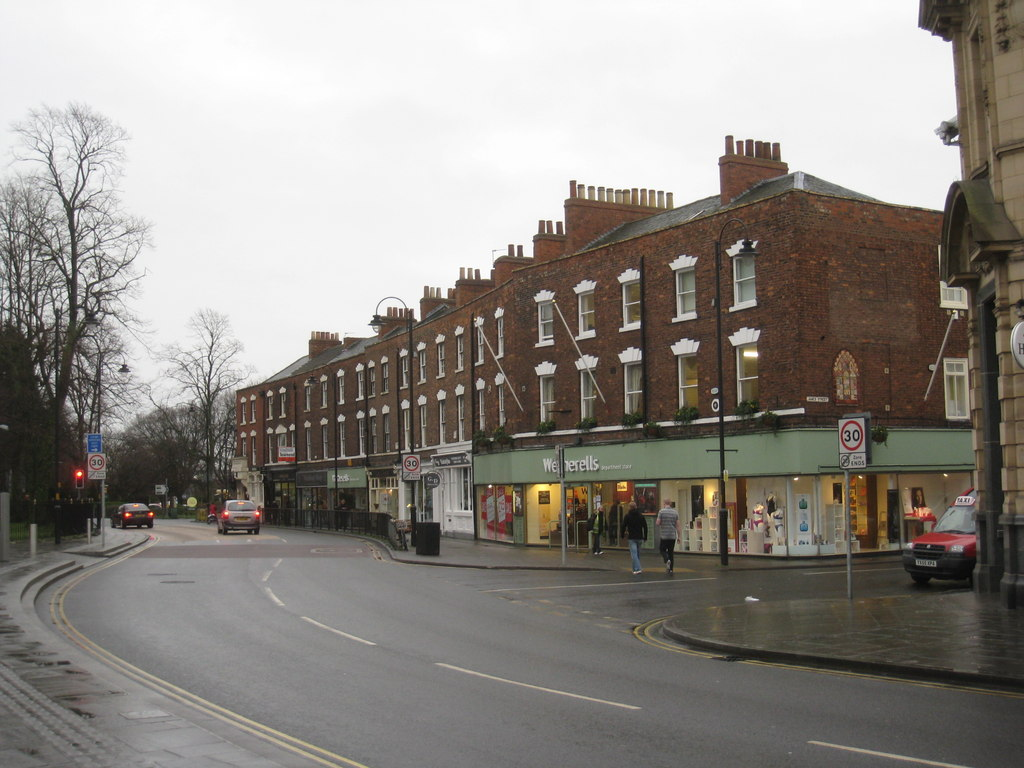
Northern part of The Crescent, in 2012

The Crescent is a terrace of buildings in Selby, a town in North Yorkshire in England.

The terrace was built by John Audus, who was inspired by Lansdown Crescent, Bath. He obtained a 99-year lease on the site from Robert Petre, 9th Baron Petre, and demolished the gateway of Selby Abbey and some monastic remains, to clear the site. Audus died in 1809, and his son, of the same name, completed work on the terrace.

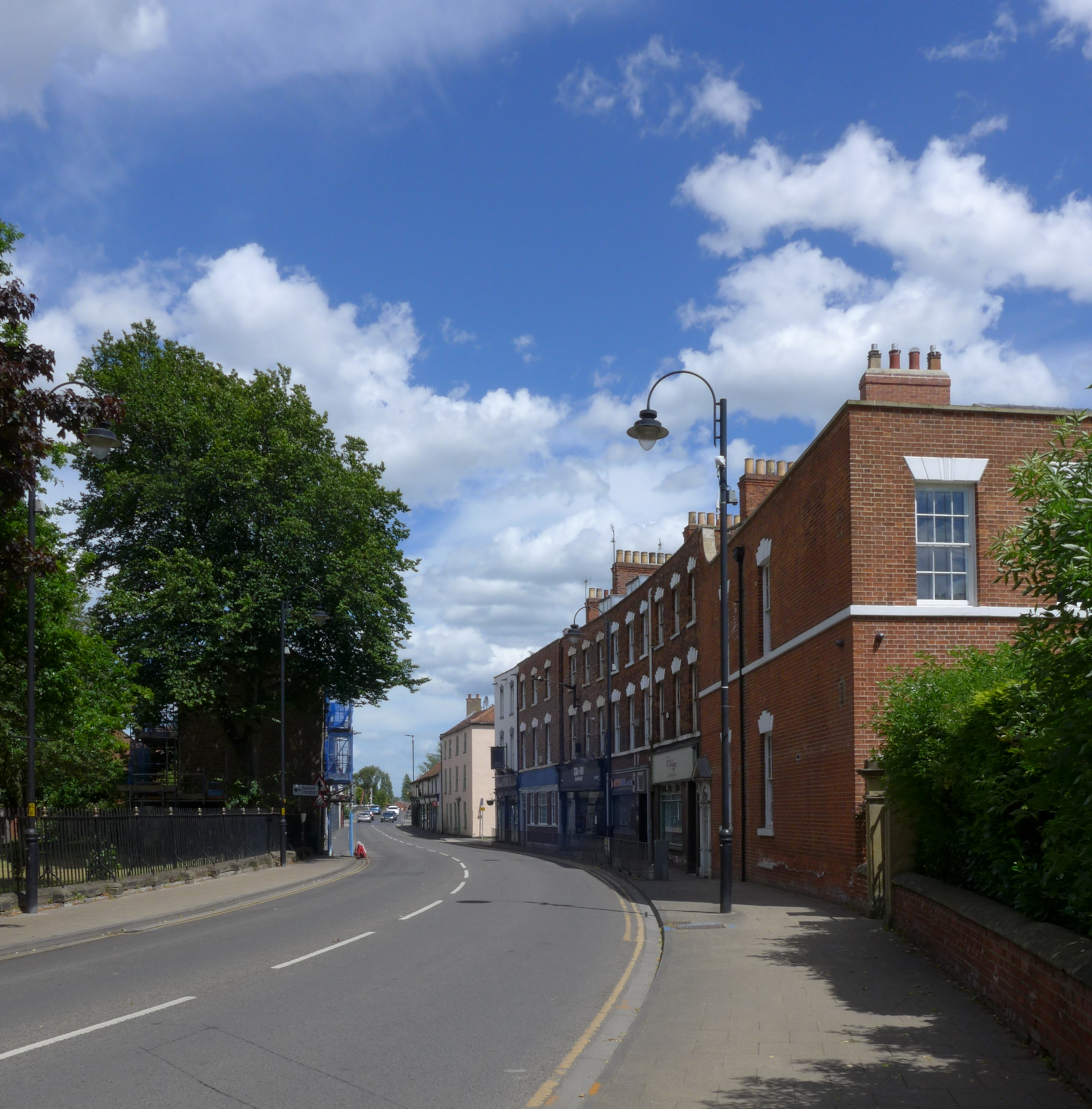
Southern part of The Crescent

The crescent consists of fourteen properties, all of which are grade II listed buildings. They are built of brick, and are three storeys high. 1 The Crescent is rendered and was later converted into the Albion Vaults pub. It was purchased by the Old Mill Brewery in 1991, and now operates under its street address. 2 to 5 have shop fronts at ground level; that of 3 The Crescent is late 19th century and has Art Nouveau details. 6 The Crescent, also known as Park House, is only two bays wide, but its principal front is to the right, and is of five bays. 7 to 14 The Crescent also has shop fronts, some dating from the 19th century, and includes a former bank. The bank and Park House were both restored in 2022.

== See also ==
- Listed buildings in Selby
