= Listed buildings in Selby =

Selby is a civil parish in the county of North Yorkshire, England. It contains about 130 listed buildings that are recorded in the National Heritage List for England. Of these, one is listed at Grade I, the highest of the three grades, two are at Grade II*, the middle grade, and the others are at Grade II, the lowest grade. The parish contains the market town of Selby and the surrounding countryside. Most of the listed buildings are houses, cottages and associated structures, shops and offices, hotels and public houses, restaurants and cafés. The others include churches, structures associated with the Selby Canal, farmhouses and farm buildings, former schools, former almshouses, a railway station, former ironworks, public buildings, a former armoury, and a telephone kiosk.

== Key ==
| Grade | Criteria |
|---|---|
| I | Buildings of exceptional interest, sometimes considered to be internationally important |
| II* | Particularly important buildings of more than special interest |
| II | Buildings of national importance and special interest |

== Buildings ==
| Name and location | Photograph | Date | Notes | Grade |
|---|---|---|---|---|
| Selby Abbey; 53.78410°N 1.06707°W | | 12th century | The church of the abbey is now a parish church. It has been altered and extended through the centuries, including restorations from 1852 by George Gilbert Scott, and later alterations by John Oldrid Scott. It consists of a nave with a clerestory, two towers at the west end, north and south aisles, north and south transepts, a choir, a north chapel, a south sacristy, and the main tower at the crossing. All the towers have corner pinnacles, the main tower has a parapet pierced by quatrefoils, and the parapets of the west towers are embattled. The west portal is Norman, with five orders of slim shafts and highly decorated arches. | I |
| Abbot's Staith; 53.78584°N 1.06670°W | | 15th or early 16th century | The building, probably originally a warehouse, is in magnesian limestone on a chamfered plinth, with rebuilding in brick. There are two storeys, and an H-shaped plan, with a long central range and taller wings at the ends. Some windows and doors are original, and others are replacements. | II* |
| 42 Gowthorpe; 53.78381°N 1.07189°W | — | 17th or early 18th century | The building, at one time the Crown and Anchor public house, was refronted in the 19th century. It is in brick, with long and short quoins, and a sprocketed pantile roof. There are two storeys and two bays. The ground floor contains a modern shopfront, and above are sash windows. | II |
| 66 and 68 Ousegate; 53.78439°N 1.06456°W | | Early 18th century (probable) | A pair of shops in colourwashed brick, with a modillion eaves cornice and a pantile roof. There are two storeys and two bays. The ground floor contains two mid-19th-century shopfronts with pilasters and an entablature, and on the upper floors are sash windows. | II |
| Corunna House; 53.78482°N 1.06549°W | | Early 18th century (or earlier) | The house is in brown brick on a moulded plinth, with rusticated quoins, a moulded eaves cornice, and a hipped pantile roof with some lead. There are two storeys and eight bays. The doorway has a shell hood on moulded acanthus consoles ith drop finials, an acanthus moulded architrave, and an eight-light oblong fanlight. To the right is a basket-arched carriage entrance, and the windows are sashes with rubbed brick lintels. | II* |
| 8, 10 and 12 Finkle Street; 53.78443°N 1.06894°W | | Early to mid-18th century | A row of three houses, later shops, in brown brick with a floor band, an eaves band, and a pantile roof with coped gables and shaped kneelers on the left. There are two storeys, and each shop has two bays. The ground floor has three shopfronts, the right one dating from the late 19th century, with a central splayed and recessed entrance and a door with a fanlight. It is flanked by windows with panelled stall risers, and pilasters with fluted consoles. The other shopfronts have been altered, and between them are passage entrances. On the upper floor are sash windows; a window above the left shop is blind. | II |
| 2 Gowthorpe; 53.78407°N 1.06952°W | | Early to mid-18th century | The shop is in painted brick, with quoins on the right, deep eaves with stepped brick brackets, and a pantile roof. There are two storeys and four bays. The ground floor contains a modern shopfront, on the upper floor are segmental-headed sash windows, and above are two flat-roofed dormers with casements. | II |
| 6 Gowthorpe; 53.78407°N 1.06974°W | | Early or mid-18th century | The shop is roughcast, and has a modillion eaves cornice and a sprocketed pantile roof. There are two storeys and one bay. The ground floor contains a modern shopfront, and on the upper floor are a sash window, and to its left is a blind window. | II |
| 98 and 100 Gowthorpe; 53.78301°N 1.07468°W | — | Early or mid-18th century | The building is in brick, with a floor band, and a pantile roof with coped gables. There are two storeys and one bay, the other bay removed to make a lorry entrance. On the upper floor is a sash window in a moulded frame. | II |
| The New Inn; 53.78407°N 1.06963°W | | Early to mid-18th century | The public house is stuccoed, on a rendered plinth, and has stone dressings, and a sprocketed roof in grey-green slate. There are two storeys and five bays. The ground floor has a public house front containing a doorway with a four-centred arched head and a narrow oblong fanlight under a lettered lintel. It is flanked by stone mullioned and transomed windows, to the right is a passageway, and above all is a stone fascia with a moulded cornice and raised lettering. On the upper floor are five segmental-headed sash windows with keystones. | II |
| 92 and 94 Gowthorpe; 53.78312°N 1.07431°W | — | 18th century | The house is roughcast, and has a pantile roof with coped gables. There are two storeys and four bays. The doorway has an oblong fanlight, and the windows are sashes. | II |
| 39 Micklegate; 53.78516°N 1.06836°W | | 18th century | A pair of stuccoed shops with a modillion eaves cornice, a pantile roof and two storeys. The ground floor contains two 19th-century shopfronts and a passage door to the left, and on the upper floor are three sash windows. | II |
| 46 Micklegate; 53.78527°N 1.06736°W | | 18th century | The building is stuccoed, with a modillion eaves cornice, and a sprocketed pantile roof with a coped gable. There are two storeys and two bays. The ground floor has a shop window flanked by doorways, the right with a moulded cornice, and on the upper floor are sash windows. | II |
| Cygnet House; 53.78471°N 1.06680°W | | Mid-18th century | The earliest part is the rear range, with the main front block added in the early 19th century. It is in brick, partly rendered, with pantile roofs. The main block has two storeys and three bays. The doorway in the right bay has chamfered jambs. a fanlight and a moulded cornice. The windows are sashes with moulded surrounds and wedge lintels. On the right return is a painted terracotta plaque. | II |
| Station Houses; 53.78360°N 1.06261°W | — | 18th century | The houses are in brown brick, and have a slate roof with coped gables. There are two storeys and four bays. On the west front is a two-storey canted bay window, the other windows are sashes, and on the south front is an arcade of three blind arches. | II |
| The George Inn; 53.78417°N 1.06854°W | | Mid-18th century | The hotel is stuccoed, and has a modillion eaves cornice and a slate roof. There are three storeys and eleven bays, the right three bays projecting and canted. On the front is a porch with Tuscan columns and pilasters, and a pediment. In the left bay is a carriage entrance, and the windows are sashes with moulded architraves. | II |
| Former Royal Oak Public House; 53.78435°N 1.06446°W | | 18th century | The public house is in colourwashed brick, with a sill band, a modillion and dentilled eaves cornice, and a slate roof. There are two storeys and three bays. The right bay contains a segmental-headed carriage entrance with rusticated voussoirs and a carved keystone. The windows are sashes with wedge lintels and keystones. | II |
| 1 Finkle Street; 53.78410°N 1.06941°W | | Late 18th century | A shop on a corner site, it is stuccoed, and has rusticated quoins, and a sprocketed and hipped pantile roof. There are two storeys, five bays on the front, and two on the left return. The ground floor contains modern shopfronts, and on the upper floor are sash windows. | II |
| 82 and 84 Gowthorpe; 53.78322°N 1.07398°W | — | Late 18th century | A pair of rendered houses with a pantile roof and coped gables. There are two storeys and four bays. In the centre are paired doorways with moulded pilasters, oblong fanlights and dentilled cornices. To the left is a shop window, and above it are casement windows. The windows in the right house are sashes. | II |
| 108 and 110 Gowthorpe; 53.78282°N 1.07524°W | | Late 18th century | A pair of houses in pink brick, with modillion eaves, a cornice, and a sprocketed pantile roof with coped gables, There are two storeys and three bays. In the centre are paired doorways with oblong fanlights, reeded cornices, scrolled consoles, and entablatures with a dentilled cornice. The windows are sashes in moulded frames, three of them tripartite. | II |
| 10–16 Market Place; 53.78379°N 1.06913°W | | Late 18th century | A terrace of seven shops with accommodation above, in brown brick, with a sill band, a coped parapet and slate roofs. There are three storeys and each shop has two bays. The ground floor contains shopfronts of differing styles, some dating from the 19th century, and others modern. On the ground floor is a passageway, the flanking shopfronts are canted. On the upper floor are sashes with wedge lintels. The left house is taller and has a modillion eaves cornice and a gable. | II |
| 1 The Crescent; 53.78404°N 1.06566°W | | Late 18th century | A public house on a corner site, later used for other purposes, it is in stuccoed brick and has a hipped slate roof. There are three storeys, two narrow bays on the front and two wider bays on the left return, a rear range and a former stable block. The ground floor contains a central doorway with a fanlight, flanked by plate glass windows and pilasters, above which is a dentilled cornice on moulded console brackets, a fascia board, and a sill band. On the upper floors are sash windows with raised voussoirs, and the left return contains sash windows with plain surrounds. | II |
| 2, 3, 4 and 5 The Crescent; 53.78390°N 1.06585°W | | Late 18th century | A row of four shops with accommodation above, in brick, with a sill band and a parapet, and brick and rendered rear ranges. There are three storeys, the left building projects slightly, and each building has three bays. The ground floor contains differing shopfronts, and on the upper floors are sash windows with raised voussoirs. | II |
| Masonic Hall; 53.78532°N 1.06622°W | | Late 18th century | A pair of houses converted for other purposes in yellow brick, the right house rendered, with a slate roof at the front, and pantile roofs at the rear. There are three storeys, the left house has two bays, and the right house has three. At the centre are paired doorways, each with pilasters on a moulded base, feather capitals, a semicircular fanlight in an architrave, a frieze with husk festoons, and a pediment. The windows are sashes with wedge lintels and fluted keystones. | II |
| Selby Lock; 53.78230°N 1.05745°W | | 1775–78 | The lock is at the north end of the Selby Canal, linking it with the River Ouse. It has massive kerbstones and retaining walls, splayed at the ends, iron bollards and mooring irons. The lock gates are wooden. | II |
| Market Cross; 53.78401°N 1.06910°W | | c. 1790 | The market cross is in stone, and stands on three square steps. The pedestal, on a shallow plinth, has a quatrefoil plan, and above it is an octagonal tapering shaft. This contains eroded gables and gargoyles, and ends in an eroded top. | II |
| Railings, Selby Abbey; 53.78371°N 1.06743°W | | 1793 | The railings enclosing the churchyard on the north, west and south sides of the churchyard are in wrought iron, on a low stone wall. On the west and south sides are gateways with square sandstone piers on chamfered plinths, with panels, and pyramidal tops with crocketed gablets and carved heads. The north gateway has octagonal stone piers with moulded conical caps. On Abbey Place, the gateway has tapered cylindrical cast iron posts with urn finials, and an overthrow with a lantern. | II |
| Wall, piers, gate and railings, 6 The Crescent; 53.78364°N 1.06655°W | | After 1793 | The garden wall extends along the south side of The Crescent. It is in brown brick with stone coping, and is slightly curved. The wall contains five stone panelled piers with moulded cornices and shallow conical caps. On the wall are a few cast iron railings with spear finials, and there is a gate, also with spear finials. | II |
| Abbey House; 53.78464°N 1.06699°W | | c. 1800 | The house is in grey brick, with a dentilled eaves cornice and a slate roof. There are three storeys and three bays. In the centre is a projecting porch with square columns, surmounted by a balcony, and a doorway with a semicircular fanlight and a dentilled cornice. This is flanked by canted bay windows. Above the doorway is a French window, and the other windows are sashes, the openings in the middle floor with wedge lintels. | II |
| Thorpe Hall; 53.77785°N 1.12487°W | — | c. 1800 | The house is in yellow brick with coved eaves and a slate roof. There are two storeys and three bays, and a single-bay extension. The doorway has panelled pilasters, an oblong fanlight, scrolled consoles and a dentilled pediment. The windows are sashes with channelled voussoirs, the middle one gadrooned. | II |
| 24–28 Gowthorpe; 53.78396°N 1.07115°W | | Late 18th to early 19th century | The shops are in painted stuccoed brick, the left shop has a pantile roof with a coped gable and moulded kneelers, and the roof of the right shop is slated. There are three storeys, the left shop has a modillion eaves cornice and three bays, and the right shop is higher, with a coped parapet, and two bays. On the right of the ground floor is an open passageway, to its left is a shopfront with panelled stall boards, and fluted pilasters with square panelled capitals, and further to the left is a double shopfront with similar features. The upper floors of both shops contain sash windows. | II |
| 136 Gowthorpe and barn 53.78230°N 1.07668°W | — | 18th or early 19th century (probable) | The barn is the older part, and is in brown brick with a modillion eaves cornice and a pantile roof with coped gables. The house dates from the middle of the 19th century, and is in brown brick with an eaves cornice on paired brackets, and a slate roof. There are two storeys and two bays. The doorway in the right bay has panelled reveals, panelled pilasters, an oblong fanlight, and a moulded cornice. To its left is a modern window, and on the upper floor are sash windows. | II |
| 65 Micklegate; 53.78567°N 1.06757°W | | Late 18th or early 19th century | The office is in brown brick, and has a pantile roof with a coped gable. There are two storeys and an attic, and three bays. On the ground floor is a modern shopfront, the upper floor contains sash windows, and above is a dormer. | II |
| 12 New Street; 53.78417°N 1.06554°W | | Late 18th to early 19th century | A public house and hotel on a corner site, later converted into flats, it is stuccoed, in brick at the rear, and has a pantile roof. There are three storeys, an L-shaped plan, five bays on the front, and three on the right return. In the centre of the front is a doorway with pilasters, an oblong fanlight and a moulded cornice. There is a doorway with a plain surround and an oblong fanlight on the right return. The windows on both fronts are sashes and on the right bay of the front are blind windows. | II |
| 50 Ousegate; 53.78468°N 1.06520°W | | Late 18th or early 19th century | A shop in red brick with a pantile roof and a coped gable. There are two storeys and attics, and five bays. On the ground floor is a 19th-century shopfront with a fascia on moulded consoles, and above are sash windows. | II |
| 120 and 122 Ousegate; 53.78295°N 1.06011°W | | Late 18th to early 19th century | A pair of houses in brown brick, the left return stuccoed, with an impost band, and a pantile roof with coped gables. There are two storeys and four bays. Each house has a doorway on the left in a recessed arch with a blind semicircular fanlight, and above is a circular window. On the right of each house is a full height round-headed arch containing windows, sashes on the left and modern windows on the right. | II |
| 4–12 Park Street; 53.78304°N 1.06722°W | | Late 18th or early 19th century | A row of five houses, some used for other purposes, in brown brick, with a sill band, a parapet and a slate roof. There are three storeys and each house has three bays. The doorways have round-arched heads, semicircular fanlights, and panelled pilasters. At the top, there is some variation; two houses have plain cornices, two have modillion pediments, and one has a flat hood on scrolled brackets. Most of the windows are sashes with rusticated stucco voussoirs, and there is one canted bay window and one bow window. | II |
| 6 The Crescent; 53.78374°N 1.06609°W | | Late 18th to early 19th century | The house is in brick, with dressings in stucco and stone, a sill band, a coped parapet and a Welsh slate roof. There are two storeys, the main range has a front of five bays and two bays on the left return, and a lower two-bay extension to the right. In the centre of the main range is a porch with Tuscan fluted columns and plain pilasters, and an entablature, and the doorway has an oblong fanlight. The windows are sashes, those on the front with stucco voussoirs and gadrooned keystones, and those on the right return with raised voussoirs. On the extreme left is a passage doorway with panelled pilasters, fluted consoles, a dentilled pediment and a blind semicircular fanlight. | II |
| 7–14 The Crescent and former bank 53.78358°N 1.06800°W | | Late 18th to early 19th century | A terrace of eight shops with accommodation above, and a former bank at the east end, in brick with a hipped Welsh slate roof and three storeys. The terrace has 22 bays, a sill band and a coped parapet. The ground floor contains modern shopfronts, and on the upper floors are sash windows with canted voussoirs and raised keystones. The former bank is on a corner, and dates from 1900. There are two bays on the front, three on the left return, and a two-storey four-bay range beyond. On the front is a bank front including a doorway with Ionic pilasters, a parapet hood on fluted consoles, and a panel depicting dolphins, and to the right are two segmental-headed windows. On the return is a canted bay window. | II |
| Barn, Elfhole Farm; 53.80105°N 1.10727°W | | Late 18th or early 19th century | The barn is in brown brick, and has a pantile roof with brick tumbled gable ends. On the north side is an extension with a catslide roof. The barn contains various openings, and external steps lead up to a door on the north side. | II |
| Flaxley Lodge Farmhouse; 53.79121°N 1.10484°W | — | Late 18th or early 19th century | The farmhouse is in brown brick, with a modillion eaves cornice, and a slate roof with coped gables on cut kneelers. There are two storeys and three bays, the middle bay slightly projecting under a pediment containing an oculus. The doorway has flanking half-columns, a semicircular fanlight with imposts and moulded voussoirs, and a pediment. On the ground floor are two semicircular bay windows, and the other windows are sashes with keystones. | II |
| Spark Hagg Farmhouse; 53.79950°N 1.11132°W | — | Late 18th or early 19th century | The farmhouse is roughcast, and has a pantile roof with coped gables on cut kneelers, There are two storeys and three bays. The central doorway has an oblong fanlight, and the windows are sashes. | II |
| Principal barn, Spark Hagg Farm; 53.79952°N 1.11094°W | — | Late 18th or early 19th century | The barn is in brown brick, with a modillion eaves cornice, and a pantile roof with coped gables and cut kneelers. There are two storeys, and it contains an open cartshed with cylindrical brick piers, and paired slit vents. | II |
| Wall and railings, Spark Hagg Farmhouse; 53.79938°N 1.11133°W | — | Late 18th or early 19th century | In front of the farmhouse is a dwarf brick wall with stone coping and cast iron railings. The principal posts have finials. | II |
| King's Church; 53.78314°N 1.07038°W | | 1809 | Originally a Congregational Church, it was refronted in 1865–66. The church has a front of polychrome brick with stone dressings, it is rendered elsewhere, and has a Welsh slate roof with grey ridge tiles. The main block has three bays divided and flanked by stock brick piers, on a chamfered and rendered plinth. The middle block is gabled, and contains an arcade of four round arches with colonnettes, and above is a large rose window with a central quatrefoil. Each outer bay contains a round-arched doorway with colonnettes, and above is an oculus. To the left is the former schoolroom, with a three-bay arcade on the ground floor and a two-bay arcade above. | II |
| 19 and 21 Gowthorpe; 53.78374°N 1.07091°W | | 1810 (probable) | Two shops on a corner site, in whitewashed brick, with a slate roof, hipped on the corner, and with a coped gable on the right. There are two storeys, two bays on the front, one on the left return, and a curved corner between. The ground floor contains modern shopfronts, and on the upper floor are horizontally sliding sash windows. | II |
| Adult learning centre 53.78161°N 1.07161°W | | 1811 | Originally a subscription school, it is in brown brick, with a modillion eaves cornice and a hipped pantile roof. There are two storeys, the entrance front has one bay, and there are five bays on the sides. On the entrance front are two round-headed doorways with semicircular fanlights, and above is a Venetian window, under which is an inscribed and dated plaque. Along the sides are sash windows with segmental heads. | II |
| 105, 109-119 and 123 Gowthorpe; 53.78245°N 1.07552°W | | 1822 | Originally almshouses, these are ten houses in three ranges around a courtyard. They are in brown brick with hipped slate roofs. There are two storeys, and each range has four bays. In the centre of the main range is a round-arched entrance, above which is a pediment-shaped gable containing an oval stone plaque with an inscription and the date. Most of the windows are horizontally-sliding sashes. The doorways and the lower floor windows have segmental-arched heads. | II |
| 1, Abbey Place; 53.78420°N 1.06821°W | | Early 19th century | The house is in brown brick with a pantile roof. There are two storeys and two bays. In the centre is a porch with two Tuscan columns and pilasters, and a pediment. The windows are sashes. | II |
| 2, 3 and 4 Abbey Place; 53.78426°N 1.06806°W | | Early 19th century | The buildings are in brown brick, partly on a plinth, with a pantile roof. There are two storeys and four bays. On the front are two doorways with oblong fanlights, the left with a segmental head, and the right with a wedge lintel. The windows are sashes, those on the ground floor with wedge lintels. | II |
| 19–22 Abbey Yard; 53.78313°N 1.06830°W | — | Early 19th century | A terrace of cottages in red brick with a pantile roof. There are two storeys and each cottage has one bay. The doorways, on the right, have blocked oblong fanlights, the windows are sashes, and all the openings have wedge lintels. | II |
| 3–9 Finkle Street; 53.78425°N 1.06933°W | | Early 19th century | A row of four shops in brown brick, with moulded eaves cornices, most dentilled, and a pantile roof with coped gables. There are three storeys, and each shop has one bay. On the ground floor are four shopfronts, two dating from the mid 19th century, with moulded pilasters and a moulded cornice. The upper floors contain sash windows. | II |
| 15–17 Finkle Street; 53.78455°N 1.06909°W | — | Early 19th century | A pair of shops in brown brick, with paired eaves brackets and a pantile roof. There are two storeys and four bays. The ground floor contains two shopfronts, the left is contemporary and has moulded pilasters, an entablature with consoles, a dentilled cornice and a recessed doorway with a fanlight. Between the shopfronts is a round-arched passage doorway and a sash window. On the upper floor are sash windows with segmental heads and keystones. | II |
| 53 and 55 Gowthorpe; 53.78346°N 1.07246°W | | Early 19th century | A pair of shops in brown brick with a pantile roof. There are two storeys and two bays. On the ground floor is a round-arched passage entry flanked by modern shopfronts, and above are segmental-headed casement windows. | II |
| 73 Gowthorpe; 53.78324°N 1.07322°W | — | Early 19th century | A restaurant in brown brick, with a modillion cornice and a pantile roof. There are two storeys and three bays. On the ground floor is a modern shopfront, and to the left is a round-arched passage entrance. The upper floor contains sash windows. | II |
| 97 and 99 Gowthorpe; 53.78266°N 1.07529°W | — | Early 19th century | A pair of houses in brown brick with a pantile roof and coped gables. The right house has a modillion cornice. There are two storeys and each house has one bay. The windows are sashes, and all the openings have wedge lintels. | II |
| 98A Gowthorpe; 53.78298°N 1.07477°W | — | Early 19th century (probable) | The building is in painted brown brick with a pantile roof. There are two storeys and one bay, and it contains sash windows. | II |
| 101 Gowthorpe; 53.78263°N 1.07531°W | — | Early 19th century | A house in a terrace in brown brick with a pantile roof. There are two storeys and one bay. On each floor is a sash window, and to the right is a blocked doorway. | II |
| 102 Gowthorpe; 53.78295°N 1.07483°W | — | Early 19th century (probable) | The house is stuccoed and has a pantile roof. There are two storeys and two bays. The right bay contains a garage opening, and elsewhere there are sash windows. | II |
| 103 Gowthorpe; 53.78261°N 1.07537°W | — | Early 19th century | A house at the end of a terrace in brown brick with a pantile roof. There are two storeys and one bay. On each floor is a sash window, and to the left is a doorway with an oblong fanlight, and a flat hood on triple consoles. | II |
| 122 Gowthorpe; 53.78266°N 1.07567°W | — | Early 19th century (probable) | A cottage at the end of a row, it is rendered, and has a pantile roof. There are two storeys, and one bay on the front and one on the side. On the front are casement windows, and the door is on the side. | II |
| 79 Micklegate; 53.78574°N 1.06706°W | | Early 19th century | The shop on a corner site is in brown brick with a modillion eaves cornice and a hipped pantile roof. Thee are two storeys and two bays. The ground floor contains a modern shopfront, and the windows on the upper floor and on the return are sashes. | II |
| 24, 26 and 28 Millgate; 53.78655°N 1.06835°W | | Early 19th century | A row of houses in brown brick with a modillion eaves cornice and a pantile roof. There are three storeys and four bays. The right bay contains a segmental-arched carriage entrance, and to the left is a doorway with a semicircular fanlight and a pediment on console brackets. The windows in the lower two floors are sashes with wedge lintels, the top floor contains casement windows, and there are two gabled dormers. | II |
| 74–84 Millgate; 53.78713°N 1.07050°W | | Early 19th century | A terrace of six houses in brown brick with a modillion eaves cornice and a pantile roof. There are two storeys, and each house has one bay. All the houses have a doorway in a moulded surround, and to its right is a sash window in each floor. | II |
| 1–13 and 13A New Street; 53.78419°N 1.06579°W | | Early 19th century | A row of seven shops in brown brick, some rendered, with a modillion eaves cornice and a pantile roof. There are three storeys, and each shop has two bays. The ground floor contains shopfronts, some contemporary, some later, and one shop has an oriel bow window. On the upper floor is a mix of sash and later windows. | II |
| 16–28 New Street; 53.78437°N 1.06538°W | | Early 19th century | A row of seven shops in rendered brown brick, with bracketed eaves cornices and a pantile roof. There are two storeys and each shop has one bay. On the ground floor are shopfronts that have recessed doorways with oblong fanlights and inclined fascias with scroll consoles. The upper floor contains three-pane casement windows. | II |
| 19–25 New Street; 53.78450°N 1.06538°W | | Early 19th century | A row of four shops, all stuccoed, the right two also with applied timber framing, and a pantile roof with a coped gable and cut kneeler on the left. There are two storeys and six bays. The ground floor contains shopfronts dating from the late 19th-century. On the upper floor are three sash windows on the left and three casement windows on the right. | II |
| 46 and 48 Ousegate; 53.78475°N 1.06530°W | | Early 19th century | A public house, later two shops, in colourwashed brick, with a modillion eaves cornice, and a Welsh slate roof with coped gables on cut kneelers. There are three storeys and three bays. In the centre of the ground floor is a carriage entrance with a depressed arch, flanked by shopfronts, the right with pilasters, a moulded cornice and a framed fascia board. The upper floor contains sash windows with wedge lintels. | II |
| 13-17 Park Row; 53.78350°N 1.06559°W | | Early 19th century | A terrace of five houses in brown brick, with a pantile roof and coped gables. There are two storeys and each house has one bay. The houses have a doorway on the left with an oblong fanlight, and a sash window in each floor on the right, and all the openings have wedge lintels. | II |
| Outhouses and privies, 13-17 Park Row; 53.78341°N 1.06548°W | | Early 19th century | The buildings are in whitewashed brick with a pantile roof. They have one storey, and contain horizontally sliding sash windows. | II |
| Dobsons Row; 53.78774°N 1.07287°W | | Early 19th century | A terrace of seven cottages in brown brick with a pantile roof. There are two storeys and each cottage has one bay, with a doorway on the right, and a horizontally sliding sash window in each floor on the left. All the openings have segmental heads. | II |
| Principal barn, Flaxley Lodge Farm; 53.79129°N 1.10511°W | — | Early 19th century | The barn is in brown brick with a modillion eaves cornice, and a pantile roof with coped gables on cut kneelers. There are two storeys, and it contains a series of two-centred relieving arches surrounding ventilation holes. | II |
| Gowthorpe House; 53.78136°N 1.07765°W | | Early 19th century | The house is in stone, with a modillion eaves cornice and a hipped slate roof. There are two storeys, three bays on the front and seven on the side. In the centre is a Roman Doric porch, and a doorway with an oblong fanlight, and the windows are sashes. To the east is a six-bay extension containing a doorway with a Tuscan surround and a doorway with an oblong fanlight, and the ground floor windows have panelled aprons. | II |
| Hempbridge Farmhouse; 53.78921°N 1.08608°W | — | Early 19th century | The farmhouse is in brown brick, with a modillion eaves cornice, and a pantile roof with coped gables. There are two storeys and three bays, and the windows are sashes. | II |
| Barn north of Hempbridge Farmhouse; 53.78941°N 1.08607°W | — | Early 19th century | The barn is in brown brick, and has a pantile roof with coped gables. There are two storeys, and it has various openings, including vents. | II |
| Stable and cartshed, Hempbridge Farm; 53.78948°N 1.08583°W | — | Early 19th century | The building is in brown brick, and has a pantile roof with coped gables. The stable is in the form of a tower with two storeys, and to the north is an open cartshed range with brick piers. | II |
| Lock House and Bridge House; 53.78216°N 1.05719°W | | Early 19th century | A pair of houses adjacent to Selby Lock on the Selby Canal, they are in brown brick, with an oversailing course at the eaves, and a hipped pantile roof. There are two storeys and six bays. On the front are two porches, and the windows are sashes, two of which in the upper floor are blocked. | II |
| Outwoods House; 53.79488°N 1.11487°W | — | Early 19th century | The house is in brown brick, and has a pantile roof with coped gables on cut kneelers. There are two storeys and three bays, and a single-bay extension to the south. The doorway is in the centre, the windows are sashes, and all the openings have segmental heads. | II |
| Principal barn west of Outwoods House; 53.79500°N 1.11536°W | — | Early 19th century | The barn is in brown brick, with buttresses, and a pantile roof with coped gables in long stone kneelers, and it contains ventilation holes in lozenge-shaped patterns. To the northwest is a two-storey outhouse with external brick stairs and a horizontally sliding sash window. On the west side is a single-storey outshut, to the north is an open cartshed, and along the road are brick piers. | II |
| The Blackamoor Public House; 53.78430°N 1.06902°W | | Early 19th century | The public house is in brown brick with a modillion eaves cornice. There are three storeys and three bays. The central doorway has Tuscan pilasters and an entablature, and the windows are sashes with wedge lintels. | II |
| The Nelson Inn; 53.78264°N 1.05926°W | | Early 19th century | The public house is in brown brick, with floor bands, an eaves cornice, and a roof of slate and pantile with coped gables on stone kneelers. There are three storeys and three bays, and rear extensions. On the ground floor are two canted bay windows, between which is a doorway with a Tuscan surround and a blocking course, and to the right is a passageway. Most of the windows on the upper floors are sash windows, and above the passageway are blind panels. | II |
| Range opposite Thorpe Hall; 53.77848°N 1.12584°W | — | Early 19th century | The range of farm buildings contains stables, a cart shed, a barn, a wall, a pump and a basin. They are in brown brick, with pantile roofs and coped gables. At the south end are two two-storey stable buildings, the cartshed is open and has cylindrical brick piers, and there is a low wall containing a lead pump with a stone basin. | II |
| Railway Goods Shed; 53.78339°N 1.06223°W | | 1830–34 | This was originally the terminus station of the Leeds and Selby Railway. It was closed in 1840 and used as a railway goods shed, and it has since been used for other purposes. It was designed by James Walker, and is in brown brick with a triple-pitched roof. The entrance front has four bays, the outer bays projecting slightly and containing segment-headed doorways. The sides have two storeys, and windows with splayed reveals and almost flat lintels of finely gauged brickwork. | II |
| 39 Gowthorpe; 53.78366°N 1.07170°W | | 1832 | The shop is in brown brick with a pantile roof. There are two storeys and two bays. The ground floor contains a modern shopfront, and above are sash windows with stucco voussoirs and fluted keystones. | II |
| Audus charity 53.78232°N 1.07587°W | | 1833 | Originally almshouses, these are ten houses in three ranges around a courtyard. They are in brown brick with hipped slate roofs. There are two storeys, three bays on the east side, and four on the west and south sides. The windows are casements with channelled voussoirs. In the middle of the south range is a low tower with an embattled parapet and crocketed corner pinnacles. It contains an entrance with a pointed head, a moulded surround, a crocketed ogee head, and an elaborate finial. Above the entrance is an inscribed and dated plaque. | II |
| 32 Church Hill; 53.78508°N 1.06583°W | | Early to mid-19th century | A shop with accommodation above, it is in brick with a slate roof at the front, and a pantile roof on the rear range. There are three storeys, two bays, and a long rear range. The ground floor contains a double-fronted shopfront with fluted and panelled pilasters, consoles with gabled caps, a canted fascia, and a billeted cornice. On the upper floors are casement windows in moulded surrounds with wedge lintels. | II |
| 7 and 9 Gowthorpe; 53.78383°N 1.07020°W | | Early to mid-19th century | A pair of shops with living accommodation in brown brick, with a roof of slate at the front and pantile at the rear. There are three storeys and four bays, and rear ranges with one and two storeys. On the left of the ground floor is a shopfront in late 19th-century style, and to the right is a modern shopfront, both with a plain fascia. The upper floors contain sash windows with wedge lintels. | II |
| 12–14 Gowthorpe; 53.78402°N 1.07001°W | | Early to mid-19th century | Originally a coaching inn, later the George Hotel, and subsequently converted into three shops, in brick, stuccoed and colourwashed on the front, with a modillion eaves cornice and a Welsh slate roof. There are three storeys and five bays. The ground floor contains shopfronts that have Tuscan piers with moulded capitals, an entablature and a frieze, and the doorways have oblong fanlights. There is a former carriage entrance with chamfered moulded piers and imposts. The right bay is canted, with a shopfront in the ground floor and a bay window above with a moulded cornice on moulded scroll console brackets. The other windows on the upper floors are sashes in architraves. | II |
| 17–19 Gowthorpe; 53.78377°N 1.07067°W | | Early to mid-19th century | A shop with accommodation above on a corner site, it is stuccoed, and has a half-hipped tile roof on the corner, and a coped gable and kneeler at the rear. There are two storeys, two bays on each front, and a rounded corner. The ground floor contains a modern shopfront, the windows on the front are casements, and on the side they are sashes. | II |
| 18 Gowthorpe; 53.78402°N 1.07034°W# | | Early to mid-19th century | A public house later used for other purposes, its carriage entrance converted into a pedestrian entrance to a shopping centre. It is stuccoed, with sandstone door surrounds, quoins, a sill band, a moulded eaves cornice, and a pantile roof. There are two storeys and two bays. The passageway has a moulded four-centred arch with a keystone and an architrave. It is flanked by shopfronts, that on the right partly recessed. The left part of the upper floor contains two windows in architraves, one a sash, the other a casement. | II |
| 19 Market Place; 53.78384°N 1.06960°W | | Early to mid-19th century | Two shops combined into one on a corner site, with accommodation above, in red brick, with dressings in painted stone and stucco, a sill band, a moulded eaves cornice, and a hipped slate roof. There are three storeys, two bays on each front, a curved bay on the corner, and rear ranges. The ground floor contains a shopfront with its doorway in the corner bay, and on the return is a doorway with an oblong fanlight and a flat hood on brackets. The windows are sashes with painted wedge lintels. | II |
| 61–73 Millgate; 53.78707°N 1.07019°W | | Early or mid-19th century | A terrace of seven houses on a curved plan in brown brick with a pantile roof. There are two storeys, and most houses have one bay. Each house has a doorway on the left and a window with a segmental head in both floors to the right. The windows are a mix of sashes and casements, and at the extreme right is a flat-headed vehicle opening. | II |
| Mount Pleasant; 53.79291°N 1.07640°W | | Early or mid-19th century | The house is in brown brick, with a modillion eaves cornice and a hipped pantile roof. There are two storeys and three bays, and a single-storey outhouse at the rear. The central doorway has a semicircular fanlight, and the windows are sashes. | II |
| The Cricketers Arms public house 53.78384°N 1.06950°W | | Early to mid-19th century | The public house is in stuccoed brick, with a modillion eaves cornice on consoles, and a partly hipped slate roof with orange and grey ridge tiles. There are three storeys and three bays, the left bay canted, and a long rear range. The ground floor contains a public house front with a full entablature, and a recessed doorway with an oblong fanlight. On the upper floors are sash windows in moulded architraves, those in the middle floor with modillion cornices on consoles. | II |
| Former Museum Hall; 53.78282°N 1.06702°W | | 1839 | Built as the Public Rooms, at one time a museum, and later used for other purposes, the building is in brown brick with stucco dressings, rusticated quoins on the ground floor, a floor band, and a pediment. There are two storeys and three bays. The ground floor contains segmental-headed sash windows with rusticated surrounds, and on the upper floor are tall round-headed windows with moulded surrounds and panelled aprons. | II |
| 14–24 Park Street and The Lodge; 53.78248°N 1.06679°W | | After 1839 | A terrace of houses in brown brick, with a sill band, a bracketed eaves cornice and a slate roof. There are two storeys and 17 bays. Most of the houses have porches with panelled square columns and an entablature with triglyphs, and doorway with a semicircular fanlight. The windows are sashes with rusticated stucco voussoirs. The Lodge, at the south end, has a twin-gabled front. | II |
| 5, 6 and 7 Abbey Place; 53.78437°N 1.06786°W | | Mid-19th century | The houses are in brown brick, with a sill band and a hipped slate roof. There are three storeys, two bays facing the Abbey, and six bays facing east. The doorway, facing the Abbey, has pilasters, an oblong fanlight and a moulded cornice. The windows are sashes, one of them tripartite. | II |
| 30 and 30a Church Hill; 53.78508°N 1.06590°W | | Mid-19th century | The shop is in brown brick with a pantile roof. There are three storeys and two bays. The ground floor contains a contemporary shopfront with a fascia on scrolled consoles. On the upper floors are sash windows with wedge lintels. | II |
| 19, 21 and 23 Finkle Street; 53.78467°N 1.06897°W | | Mid-19th century | A row of shops in brown brick with paired gutter consoles and a slate roof. There are three storeys and five bays. In the centre is an elliptical-headed carriage entrance with a mask keystone. The ground floor contains shopfronts, and on the upper floors are sash windows with gadrooned keystones. | II |
| 27 and 29 Finkle Street; 53.78483°N 1.06882°W | | Mid-19th century | A pair of stuccoed shops, with a modillion eaves cornice and a slate roof. There are three storeys and two bays. The ground floor contains two shopfronts, the left modern, the right contemporary, with panelled pilasters, a fascia on moulded consoles, and a door with a fanlight, and to the left is a passage doorway. On the middle floor are canted oriel windows with moulded cornices and angle colonnettes, and the top floor has sash windows. | II |
| 31 Finkle Street; 53.78489°N 1.06875°W | — | Mid-19th century | The shop is in brown brick, with a moulded modillion eaves cornice. moulded consoles, and a slate roof. On the ground floor is a panelled shopfront, and a doorway to the left with an oblong fanlight. The upper floors contain sash windows with wedge lintels and triple keystones. | II |
| 72 Gowthorpe; 53.78346°N 1.07321°W | | Mid-19th century | An office with stucco dressings, a diagonally-placed brick eaves cornice and a slate roof. There are two storeys and three bays. The central doorway has an oblong fanlight, panelled reveals, panelled pilasters and a modillion cornice. On the right is a round-arched passage entrance with a blind semicircular fanlight and a keystone, and the windows are sashes with fluted keystones. | II |
| 106 Gowthorpe; 53.78288°N 1.07511°W | | Mid-19th century | A house at the end of a terrace, in red brick on a plinth, with a slate roof. There are two storeys and three bays. On the right is a doorway with panelled reveals, an oblong fanlight, and an entablature with moulded consoles. In the left bay is a carriage entrance with an arched head and gauged brick voussoirs. Elsewhere, there are sash windows, and on the right return is a round-arched window. | II |
| 48 and 50 Micklegate; 53.78534°N 1.06721°W | | Mid-19th century | A pair of shops in chequer brick with a modillion eaves cornice and a slate roof, hipped at the north end. There are three storeys and four bays. The ground floor contains modern shopfronts, and on the upper floor are sash windows with wedge lintels. | II |
| 61 and 63 Micklegate; 53.78562°N 1.06764°W | | Mid-19th century (probable) | The building is in brown brick, and has a slate roof with tile cresting. There are two storeys and six bays. The ground floor contains two shopfronts, and on the upper floor are sash windows with voussoirs. | II |
| 20 and 22 Millgate; 53.78644°N 1.06822°W | | Mid-19th century | A pair of houses in brown brick with a pantile roof and coped gables on cut stone kneelers. There are three storeys and four bays. In the centre are paired doorways with Tuscan pilasters, panelled reveals, oblong fanlights, and a moulded cornice. The windows are sashes with fluted keystones. | II |
| 83 Millgate; 53.78692°N 1.07092°W | — | Mid-19th century | The house is in brown brick and has a slate roof with coped gables. There are two storeys and three bays. The central doorway has a Tuscan surround and an oblong fanlight. The windows are sashes, those in the ground floor with wedge lintels. | II |
| 85 Millgate; 53.78697°N 1.07103°W | — | Mid-19th century | The house is in brown brick with a hipped pantile roof. There are two storeys and two bays. The left bay contains a large carriage entrance with a depressed arched head. On the right bay is a shopfront with pilasters and a moulded cornice, and a doorway with an oblong fanlight. The upper floor has a small two-light window on the left and a sash window with a segmental head on the right. | II |
| 15 New Street; 53.78435°N 1.06559°W | | Mid-19th century | A pair of shops in brown brick with a slate roof. There are three storeys and three bays. The ground floor contains shopfronts with fluted pilasters, and above are sash windows with wedge lintels. | II |
| 34 and 36 Ousegate; 53.78503°N 1.06571°W | | Mid-19th century | A pair of commercial properties with accommodation above in red brick, with a roof of Welsh slate at the front, orange tile at the rear, and coped gables and shaped kneelers. There are three storeys and three bays. The ground floor contains two shopfronts, the left in late 19th-century style, the right with plate glass windows, and between them is a passage doorway with an oblong fanlight. On the upper floor are sash windows with wedge lintels. | II |
| 38 Ousegate; 53.78496°N 1.06562°W | | Mid-19th century | An office in red brick with paired eaves brackets and a slate roof. There are two storeys and four bays. On the ground floor is a shopfront with Tuscan pilasters, an entablature and a dentilled cornice, and to the right is a recessed doorway. The upper floor contains windows with moulded lintels. | II |
| 64 Ousegate; 53.78442°N 1.06465°W | | Mid-19th century | A restaurant in painted brown brick with a slate roof. There are three storeys and two bays. On the ground floor is a late 19th-century shopfront and a round arched doorway to the right. The upper floors contain sash windows with wedge lintels. | II |
| 98–104 Ousegate; 53.78323°N 1.06108°W | | Mid-19th century | A terrace of four houses in brown brick with a modillion eaves cornice, and a slate roof with coped gables on cut stone kneelers. There are three storeys, the left house has three bays, and the others have one each. The left doorway has an oblong fanlight and a deep moulded cornice on gadooned consoles, and the other doorways have plain surrounds and oblong fanlights. The windows are sashes, and all the openings, apart from the left doorway, have gadrooned keystones. | II |
| Brooklands; 53.78114°N 1.08204°W | | Mid-19th century | A large house, later used for other purposes, in red brick, with some grey brick, stone dressings and a slate roof with shaped gables and finials. There are two storeys and attics. Over the entrance is a three-storey tower with a balustraded parapet, and lions on the corner piers. On the ground floor are canted bay windows with balustraded parapets, and the other windows are round-arched sashes with keystones and hood moulds. On the garden front is an arcaded loggia. | II |
| Former Ironworks (north); 53.78415°N 1.06392°W | | Mid-19th century | The building is in red brick, with sill bands, a moulded modillion eaves cornice, and a roof with coped gables on elaborate moulded kneelers. There are two storeys and nine bays. On the ground floor is a carriage entrance and windows, all with segmental heads. On the upper floor are round-headed sash windows, most in pairs and one triple. All the openings have moulded keystones. | II |
| Former Ironworks (south); 53.78399°N 1.06343°W | | Mid- 19th century | The building is in red brick, with moulded sill bands, string courses, impost bands, and an eaves cornice. There are three storeys and seven bays. On the ground floor is a segmental-arched carriage entrance, the windows in the ground and top floors have segmental heads, and those in the middle floor have round-arched heads. The doors have cast iron ornamental grilles in the upper part. | II |
| Former Pendulum Club; 53.78566°N 1.06687°W | | Mid-19th century | The building is in whitewashed brick, with a sill band and a slate roof. There are three storeys and four bays, the right bay slightly angled. On the ground floor is a doorway on the left, and a segmental-arched opening. The windows are sashes with gadooned keystones. | II |
| Former Jolly Sailor Inn; 53.78334°N 1.06146°W | | Mid-19th century | The public house is in whitewashed brick with a modillion eaves cornice and a slate roof. There are three storeys and three bays. The ground floor contains a bow window, and a doorway to the left. The windows are sashes, and all the openings have gadrooned keystones. | II |
| Former Station Public House; 53.78405°N 1.06365°W | | Mid-19th century | The former public house is in brown brick with a slate roof. There are two storeys and three bays. The central doorway has panelled pilasters, an oblong fanlight and an entablature. To the right is a modern tripartite window, and the other windows are sashes with wedge lintels. | II |
| St Mary's Church; 53.78221°N 1.07720°W | | 1856 | The church is in sandstone with white limestone dressings and a slate roof. It consists of a nave with a clerestory, a west baptistry with an apse, north and south aisles, a south transept, a chancel and a sacristy, a northwest chapel, and a southwest steeple. The steeple has a tower with three stages, buttresses, string courses, a south doorway with a pointed arch, and a niche containing a statue above. The bell openings have two lights, and above is a corbel table, and a broach spire with lucarnes. | II |
| Former Armoury; 53.77984°N 1.07663°W | | 1864–65 | Originally an armoury and drill hall, later used for other purposes, it is in brown brick with ornamentation in yellow brick and has a slate roof. There is one storey, and flanking gabled wings with two storeys and sides of five bays. The middle bay of the main range is taller and gabled, and contains a segmental-arched opening, above which is a decorative arched window. The outer bays contain modern windows, and in the wings are segmental-headed sash windows. | II |
| St James' Church; 53.78254°N 1.07118°W | | 1866–67 | The church is in stone and has a slate roof with tile cresting. It consists of a nave with a clerestory, north and south aisles, north and south porches, north and south transepts, a chancel with a vestry, and a west tower. The tower has five stages, buttresses, string courses, an arcade of four pointed arches in the fourth stage with circular windows above, three-light bell openings, and a stepped embattled parapet with corner crocketed pinnacles. | II |
| Selby railway station 53.78301°N 1.06316°W | | 1871 | The station was built by the North Eastern Railway. On the up platform is a building in brown brick with blue string courses, chequered voussoirs and stone dressings. It has a single storey, and contains six segment-headed windows and nine doorways with fanlights. On both platforms are canopies with half-hipped roofs, glazed above and in slate below, carried on decorative cast iron columns. The footbridge is in iron and has a single span, enclosed sides and a segmental roof. The benches are in cast iron and in rustic style. | II |
| The Golden Lion Public House; 53.78663°N 1.06851°W | | Late 19th century | The public house is in whitewashed brick with a modillion eaves cornice and a slate roof. There are two storeys and two bays. On the ground floor is a public house front, containing two recessed doorways with panelled reveals and oblong fanlights. Between them are two windows with arched glazing bars and finials, and moulded panels at dado level. Above is a moulded and modillion cornice on seven gadrooned consoles with large lions' masks. The upper floor has two sash windows with raised and panelled architraves, and a moulded cornice with modillions on elaborate moulded consoles. | II |
| Former York County Savings Bank; 53.78384°N 1.07000°W | | Late 19th century | Originally a bank and later used for other purposes, it is on a corner site, and is in red brick with stone dressings, with string courses, and a slate roof. There are two storeys and an attic, and fronts of two bays. On the corner is a polygonal turret, corbelled out, with transomed windows and a conical roof with a finial. Both fronts have a gable with a crocketed finial, and the upper floor and attic have mullioned and transomed windows. The doorway on Gowthorpe has a round head, and a pediment containing a coat of arms. The other ground floor bays contain round-headed windows, and on New Lane is a former carriage entrance. | II |
| Telephone kiosk 53.78358°N 1.06692°W | | 1935 | The telephone kiosk in The Crescent is of the K6 type designed by Giles Gilbert Scott. Constructed in cast iron with a square plan and a dome, it4 has three unperforated crowns in the top panels. | II |
