= St Mary's Church, Selby =

Church in Selby, North Yorkshire, England

Coordinates: 53.7821°N 1.0773°W

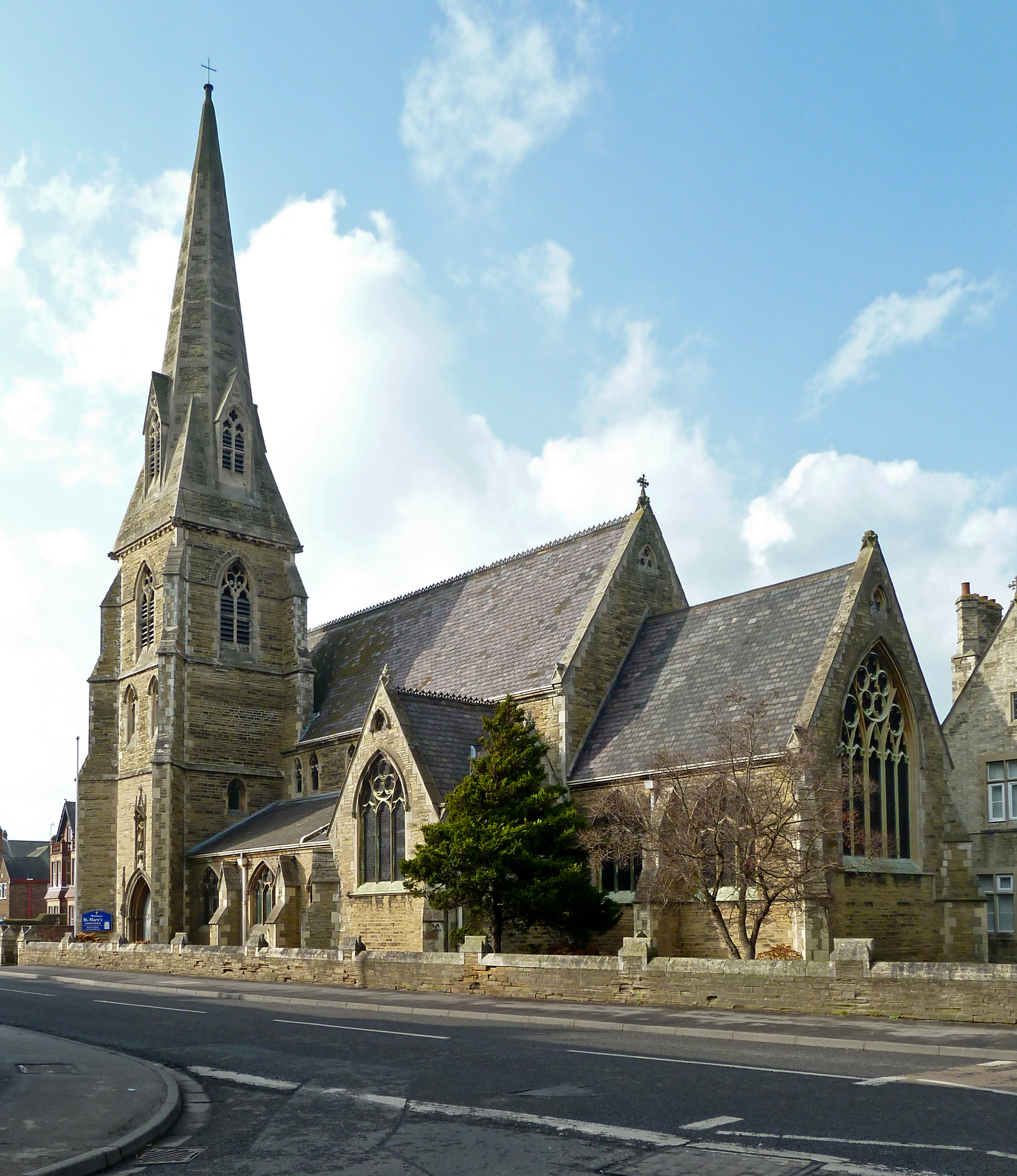
The church, in 2012

St Mary's Church is a Catholic church in Selby, a town in North Yorkshire, in England.

A mass house opened in Selby in 1791, on Ousegate. Laura Marie Petre paid for the construction of a Catholic church on Leeds Road, which was designed by Charles Hansom and opened in 1856. In 1931, the north aisle was extended to the west, with the addition being in the style of the Lourdes grotto. The east end of the church was reordered in the 1970s, and a timber ceiling was inserted in the nave. In the 1990s, the area under the west gallery was screened off, initially to be used as a children's space. A church hall was added to the north of the building in 2004, to a design by Martin Stancliffe Architects. It is connected to the church by a long glazed corridor. The church was grade II listed in 1980.

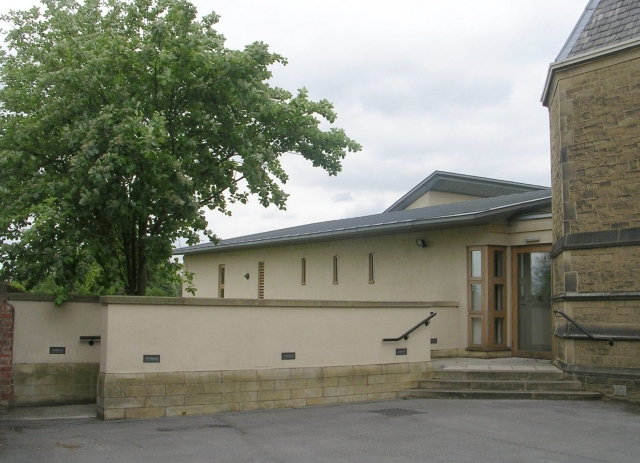
The church hall

The church is built of sandstone with white limestone dressings and a slate roof. It consists of a nave with a clerestory, an octagonal west baptistry, north and south aisles, a south transept, a chancel and a sacristy, an octagonal northwest chapel, and a southwest steeple. The steeple has a tower with three stages, buttresses, string courses, a south doorway with a pointed arch, and a niche containing a statue above. The bell openings have two lights, and above is a corbel table, and a broach spire with lucarnes. Inside, there is a west gallery on a three-arch arcade, and the original stone pulpit, reredos, altar and font. The east window has stained glass by William Wailes. The grotto, described by Historic England as "quite exceptional", is built of uncarved boulders and incorporates a piece of stone from Lourdes. It has a central altar, and a status of Our Lady in a niche on the east side.

== See also ==
- Listed buildings in Selby
