= Selby Town Hall =

Municipal building in Selby, North Yorkshire, England

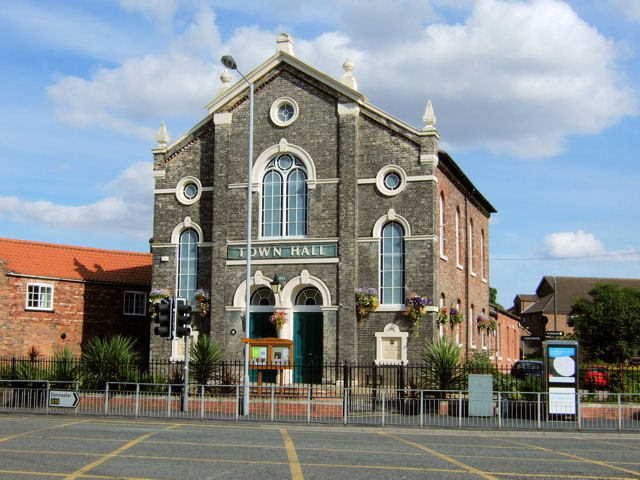
- Selby Town Hall

- Shown in North Yorkshire
- 53.7831°N 1.0735°W
- Location: York Street, Selby

History
- Built: 1862

Site notes
- Architectural style: Italianate style

Selby Town Hall is a municipal building in York Street in Selby, North Yorkshire, England. The structure, which was built as a Methodist chapel, is now the home of Selby Town Council.

== History ==
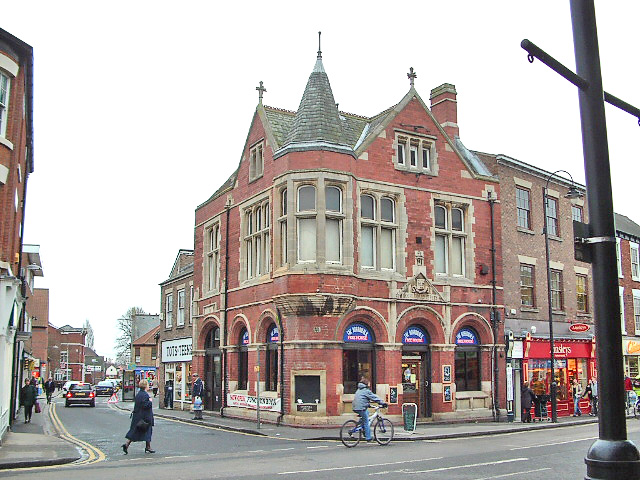
The old council offices on the corner of Gowthorpe and New Lane

The local board of health in Selby, which was established in 1851, established its first purpose-built offices on the corner of Gowthorpe and New Lane. These offices were designed in the Gothic Revival style, built in red brick with stone dressings and were completed in the late 19th century. The building featured a turret with a conical roof on the corner with New Lane, arched openings on the ground floor, mullioned windows on the first floor and attic windows in the gables above. The offices became the headquarters of Selby Urban District Council when it was formed in 1894 and were converted for use as a branch of the York County Savings Bank after the council moved to modern premises in Park Street in the 1960s.

Meanwhile, the Primitive Methodist Church, which had been established by William Clowes in the early 19th century, decided to establish a chapel in Selby in 1840. The church initially operated from a small chapel in a yard off Gowthorpe but, in the 1850s, Lord Londesborough donated a site in York Street to create a more substantial building.

The foundation stone for the new building was laid on 4 April 1862. It was designed in the Italianate style, built in brown brick with stone dressings and was officially opened on 10 October 1862. The design involved a symmetrical main frontage with three bays facing onto the corner of Gowthorpe and Brooke Street; the central bay, which slightly projected forward, featured two round headed doorways separated by a Corinthian order column and flanked by Doric order pilasters; there was a two-light mullioned window on the first floor with an oculus in the gable above and there were finials and urns at roof level. It was renovated in 1926 but, following a reduction in religious attendances, it was decommissioned as a chapel in August 1956.

The building served as a health clinic in the late 1950s and then operated as a tyre depot under the management of Moss Tyres and then ATS Group in the 1960s and 1970s. It then fell vacant in the 1980s and remained derelict until it was acquired by Selby Town Council in 1990. After an extensive programme of refurbishment works, which involved the creation of an events venue as well as offices for the town council, the building was reopened in 1996. The building received a Good Design Award from the Selby Civic Society, for the quality of the refurbishment works, in 1998. Performers at the town hall since then have included the singer songwriters Boo Hewerdine and Brooks Williams in December 2012, and the singer songwriter Ralph McTell in February 2019.
