= King's Church Selby =

Church in Selby, North Yorkshire, England

Coordinates: 53°46′59″N 1°04′13″W

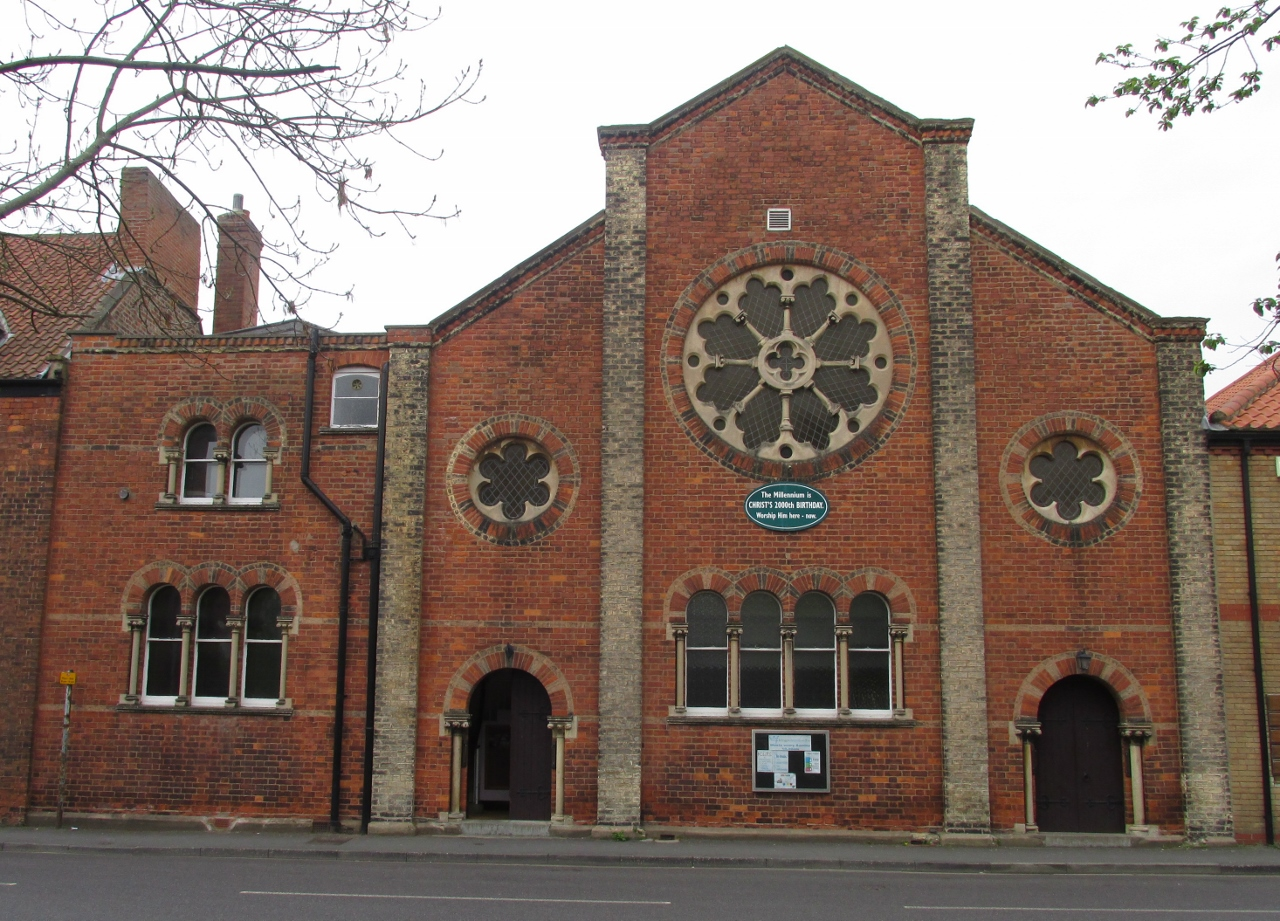
The church, in 2014

King's Church Selby is a historic church in Selby, a town in North Yorkshire, in England.

Andrew Reed was sent by the Hackney Academy to preach in Selby in July 1808. His sermons proved immediately popular, and although he left in August, a Mr Seaton came to replace him in October, and began construction of a rectangular chapel, which opened in March 1809. The congregation continued to grow, and in 1812, galleries were added. In 1842, a vestry and schoolroom were added to the south of the chapel. The capacity of the chapel eventually grew to 500. In 1866, James Pigott Pritchett refronted the chapel and renovated the building, which by then was part of the Congregational Union of England and Wales. In 1972, this became part of the United Reformed Church (URC), which in 1977 renovated the building, removing the choir stalls and installing a kitchen. By 2009, the building was shared with the King's Church, and in 2012 the URC moved out, leaving the building entirely to the King's Church.

The church has been grade II listed since 1980. It has a front of polychrome brick with stone dressings, it is rendered elsewhere, and has a Welsh slate roof with grey ridge tiles. The main block has three bays divided and flanked by stock brick piers, on a chamfered and rendered plinth. The middle block is gabled, and contains an arcade of four round arches with colonnettes, and above is a large rose window with a central quatrefoil. Each outer bay contains a round-arched doorway with colonnettes, and above is an oculus. To the left is the former schoolroom, with a three-bay arcade on the ground floor and a two-bay arcade above.

== See also ==
- Listed buildings in Selby
