= Selby =

Town and civil parish in North Yorkshire, England

Coordinates: 53°47′01″N 1°04′04″W

- Town
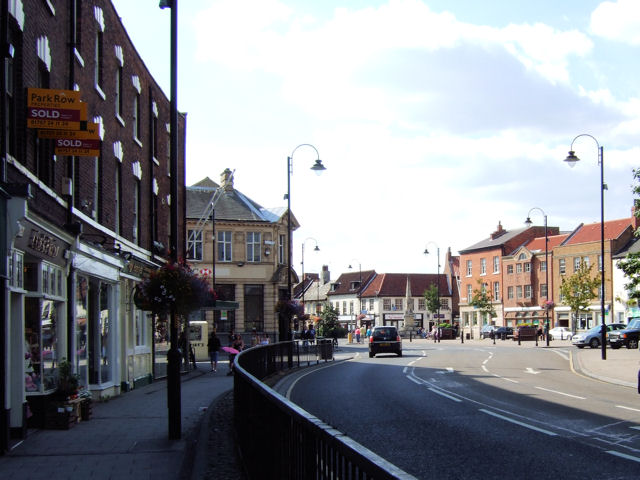
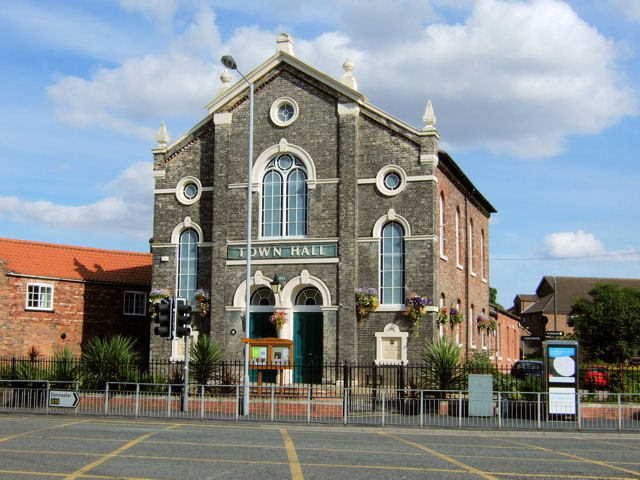
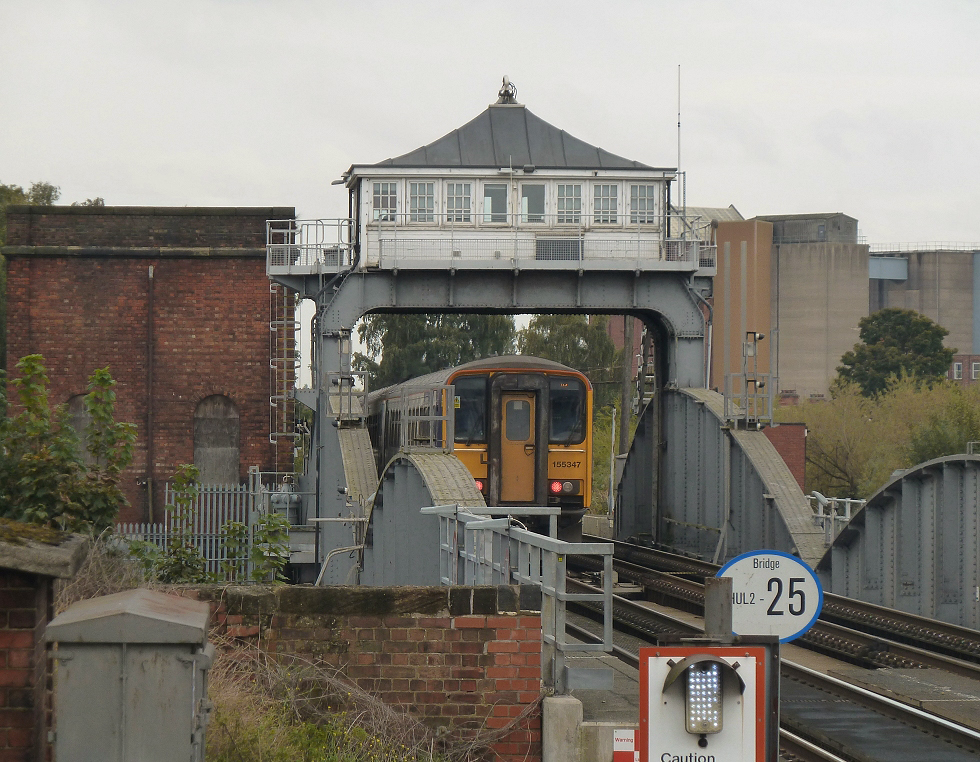
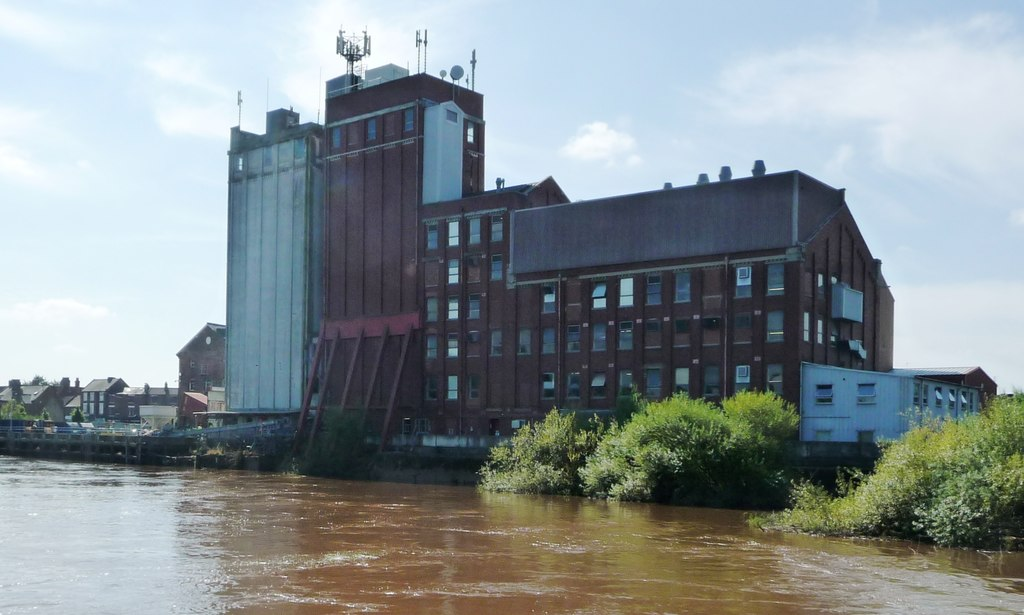
- The Crescent Selby Town Hall Selby Abbey Swing Bridge The River Ouse

- Coat of arms

- Location within North Yorkshire
- Population: 17,193 (2021 Census)
- OS grid reference: SE614323
  - London: 162 mi (261 km) SE
- Civil parish: Selby
- Unitary authority: North Yorkshire
- Ceremonial county: North Yorkshire
- Region: Yorkshire and the Humber
- Country: England
- Sovereign state: United Kingdom
- Post town: SELBY
- Postcode district: YO8
- Dialling code: 01757
- Police: North Yorkshire
- Fire: North Yorkshire
- Ambulance: Yorkshire
- UK Parliament: Selby
- Website: www.selbytowncouncil.gov.uk

Selby is a market town and civil parish in North Yorkshire, England, 12 miles (19.3 km) south of York on the River Ouse. At the 2021 Census, it had a population of 17,193.

The town grew around Selby Abbey, a former Benedictine house whose surviving church is nationally protected. Historic records indicate that Henry I of England was born in the town.

The town was historically part of the West Riding of Yorkshire and was transferred to the new county of North Yorkshire in 1974. From 1974 until 2023 it was the administrative centre of the Selby District. Local government is now provided by North Yorkshire Council, a unitary authority.

Selby once had a large shipbuilding industry, and was an important port on the Selby Canal, which brought trade from Leeds. It also had a large mining industry

== History ==
=== Foundation ===
Archaeological investigations in Selby have revealed extensive remains, including waterlogged deposits in the core of the town dating from the Roman period onwards. It is believed that Selby originated as a settlement called Seletun, which was referred to in the Anglo-Saxon Chronicle of AD 779.

The place name 'Selby' is first attested in a Yorkshire charter c. 1030, where it appears as Seleby. It appears as Selbi c. 1050. The name is thought to be a Scandinavian form of Seletun, meaning 'sallow tree settlement'.

=== Development ===
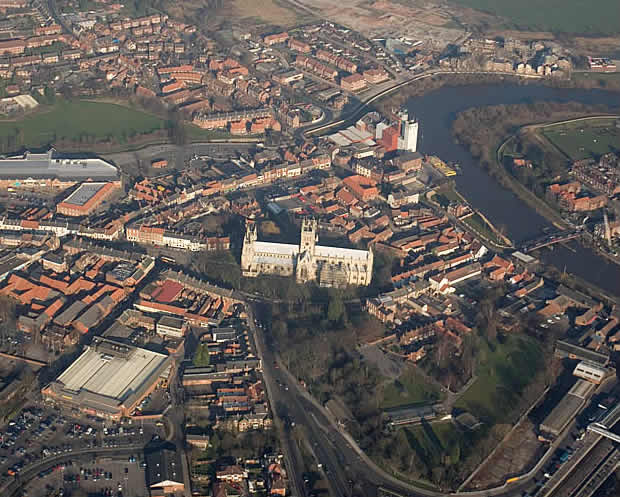
Aerial view of Selby

The town of Selby is on the main route north from the Midlands and is the traditional birthplace of King Henry I, fourth son of William the Conqueror, in 1068/69; the connection is supported by William and his wife Matilda's unique joint charter of Selby Abbey, far to the north of their usual circuit of activities, which was founded for Benedict of Auxerre in 1069 and subsequently supported by the de Lacy family. King Henry I is reputed to have been born there in c. 1068. A notable feature of the abbey is the 14th-century Washington Window, featuring the heraldic arms of the ancestors of George Washington, the first president of the United States. The design is often cited as an influence for the Stars and Stripes flag.

It is said that the abbey was founded when Benedict saw three swans on a lake in Selby, which he took as a sign of the Father, Son and Holy Ghost, and that is why the official crest of Selby Abbey is three swans. Selby Abbey was closed in 1539 as part of the Dissolution of the Monasteries under Henry VIII and the majority of the buildings have since been demolished. The central nave of the abbey church survived and in 1618 it became the parish church of Selby.

During the English Civil War the Royalist garrison of Selby was captured by Parliamentarians in the Battle of Selby on 11 April 1644. There are other historical sites, such as the cholera burial ground on the north side of the abbey, Selby Market Cross and the local school, Selby High School. The Market Place has existed since the early 14th century, when the market was moved away from the monastery churchyard. The Crescent which curves eastwards from James Street, was planned in the early 19th century by a local man, John Audus, after he saw Lansdown Crescent in Bath, Somerset.

=== Since 2000 ===
Selby is expanding. New houses and shops are being built on the outskirts as far as the bypass, which has resulted in the loss of some trade from the town centre. Meanwhile, the riverfront is being revamped with modern housing and fashionable flats.

==== Rail crash ====
The 2001 Great Heck rail crash is also often referred to as the Selby rail crash. It happened a few miles south of Selby, at the village of Great Heck near the M62 motorway, and Selby was the closest major town to the accident site. On 28 February 2001 a vehicle crashed off the M62 down an embankment onto a railway track, where it was struck by a passenger train heading to London. The accident was then compounded by a second collision involving an oncoming goods train.

==== Hobson murders ====
Selby and its surrounding area again came to national prominence through another tragedy on 18 July 2004, this time through four exceptionally violent murders carried out by Mark Hobson, a former refuse collector. Hobson, 34 at the time, killed his girlfriend, Claire Sanderson, 27, and her sister Diane at a flat in the nearby village of Camblesforth. He subsequently murdered an elderly couple, James and Joan Britton, at their home in the village of Strensall, near York. Hobson was later sentenced to life imprisonment, with the trial judge recommending that he should never be released; the High Court later agreed with this recommendation.

== Governance ==
Selby Town Council
- Seal

Type
- Type: Town Council

History
- Founded: 1974

Leadership
- Mayor: Steve Shaw-Wright (L)
- Town clerk: Gill Bell

Structure
- Seats: 18 councillors
- Labour: 12 / 18
- Conservative: 4 / 18
- Green: 1 / 18
- Reform: 1 / 18

Elections
- Voting system: Plurality-at-large
- Last election: 4 May 2023
- Next election: 6 May 2027

Meeting place
- Selby Town Hall

Website
- selbytowncouncil.gov.uk

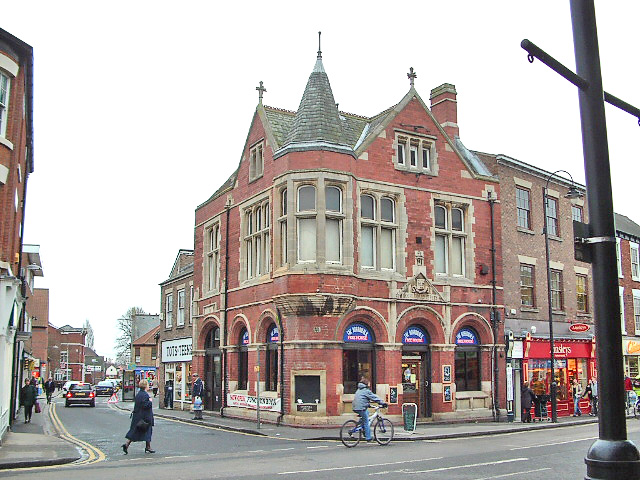
Former town council offices, Selby

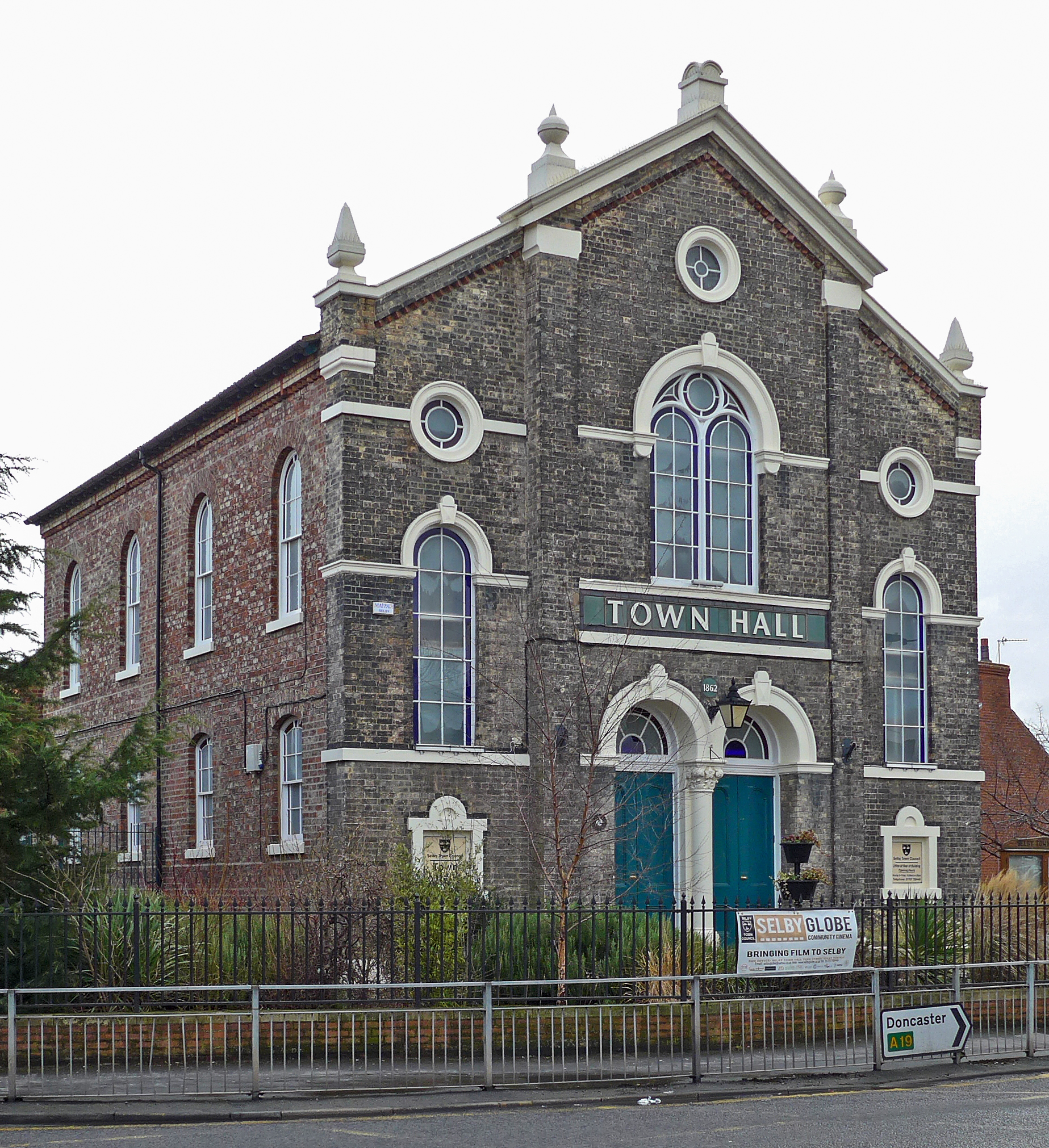
Selby Town Hall

At the lowest level of governance is Selby Town Council. The town is divided into three electoral wards, north, south, each represented by five councillors, and west, represented by seven councillors. These 17 councillors are responsible for burial grounds, allotments, play areas and some street lighting. Elections to the town council are held every four years. The Mayor of Selby is elected annually by the members of the town council.

From 1974 to 2023, Selby was administered as part of a two-tier council system by Selby District Council. The town was represented by seven councillors on the District Council, two each for the west and south wards and three for the north ward. On the North Yorkshire County Council the town was part of the Selby Barlby county division, which elected two representatives to the county council.

In April 2023, both councils, along with all district councils in North Yorkshire, were replaced by North Yorkshire Council. The unitary authority now provides all the services previously provided separately by the two councils.

In the United Kingdom Parliament, Selby forms part of the Selby constituency, which was created for the 2024 general election as part of the Boundary Commission for England’s 2023 review, succeeding most of the former Selby and Ainsty seat. It has been represented by Labour MP Keir Mather since July 2023, when he won a by-election held in the previous constituency.

== Geography ==
Selby lies on the tidal River Ouse, in a natural area of Yorkshire known as the Humberhead Levels, a flat, low-lying agricultural plain shaped by glacial lake sediments and river alluvium, crossed by ditches and drains that discharge to the Ouse and its tributaries.

The surrounding ground is very low-lying, mostly between about 5 and 8 metres above sea level, with extensive alluvial deposits along the river corridor.

=== Roads ===
The main roads that cross at Selby are the A63 from Leeds to Hull and the A19 from Doncaster to York, though the A19 and A63 have no longer met in Selby itself since the opening of the Selby Bypass in 2004.

The River Ouse is navigable upstream as far as York, so the old toll bridge had to allow for this. For many years the swing bridge in Selby was a notorious local bottleneck, but since the opening of the Selby bypass, congestion in the town has been relieved.

=== Developments ===
The importance of Selby as a market town has declined in recent decades and its short-lived prominence as the centre of the Selby Coalfield has also waned. Selby is close to both York and Leeds. Its popularity as a tourist destination, owing to Selby Abbey, has led to a large amount of development and renovation in the town and surrounding area.

The residential areas of Selby have undergone expansion and development in recent years. One of the more prominent developments, Staynor Hall continues to grow southeast of the town, while other housing estates have taken shape near Holmes Lane and in the surrounding villages of Brayton, Barlby, and Thorpe Willoughby. Along the riverfront, construction has continued as part of an ongoing project to improve an area that had been largely derelict since the decline of the shipbuilding industry.

== Flooding ==
Selby lies on a tidal reach of the River Ouse and falls within a flood-alert zone designated by the Environment Agency. This particular area spans the Ouse between Naburn Lock and Selby.

In November 2000, the lower Ouse rose to unusually high levels. Selby itself was mostly unaffected, while nearby Barlby saw significant flooding. A subsequent House of Commons debate noted that about 300 properties in Selby and Barlby were flooded.

Since 2000 the river corridor around Selby has seen improvements to flood defences. This includes the introduction of a formal Selby Flood Alleviation Scheme. More broadly, flood risk is now being tackled at the catchment scale, taking into account the combined threats from fluvial, tidal and surface-water sources of flooding.

== Religion ==
Selby Abbey, south semitransept and tower

Selby Abbey serves as the Church of England parish church for the town within the Diocese of York. The Roman Catholic parish is centred on St Mary’s on Gowthorpe and forms part of the Diocese of Leeds. It is one of the largest parish churches in Britain and is larger than several cathedrals.

There are various other Christian churches in the town that offer community and differing styles of worship: King's Church Selby, the Catholic St Mary's Church, Portholme Methodist / URC Church, and St James' Church. Edge Community was founded in 2009 for the Flaxley Road community, and The Salvation Army opened The Church at the Crossroads on the Abbotts Road estate in 2015.

Selby Churches Together set up and run the Selby and District Food Bank.

== Economy ==
Much of the historical wealth of the town is based on its position on the banks of the tidal River Ouse. Selby used to have a large shipbuilding industry, and was an important port on the Selby Canal, which brought trade from Leeds. The Selby Canal links the River Ouse at Selby to the River Aire at Haddlesey. The replacement Greenpeace craft (1989–2011), bearing the name Rainbow Warrior, was built in Selby in 1957 as a fishing boat. Selby's location allowed vessels to be launched into the river. This often required the more unusual technique of launching the vessels side-on into the river owing to lack of space for a more conventional stern-first or bow-first launch. One famous vessel of the Cochrane and Son's shipyard of the town is the preserved trawler Ross Tiger at Grimsby's National Fishing Heritage Centre. Cochrane launched their last vessel into the Ouse in 1998, a historical occasion which people around the area went to see. After Cochrane had closed the massive cranes still stood over the skyline of Selby until 2001, when very strong winds blew them down. Most of the shipyard buildings are still standing (as of February 2014) and the site, along with interviews with former employees and archive film, was featured in a 2013 video production 'Cochranes of Selby'. The site of the shipyard is currently home to many small businesses, housed in the buildings once used to build the Selby ships.

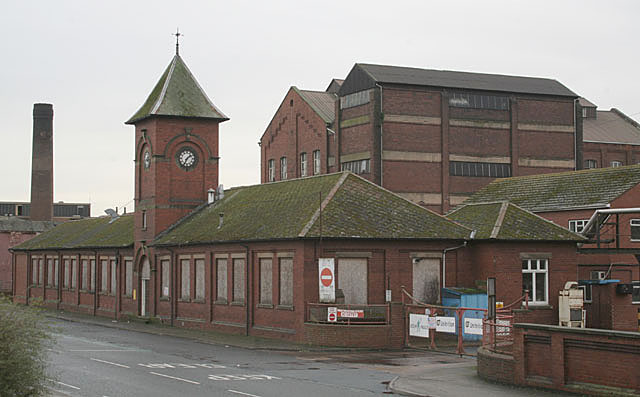
BOCM mills at Barlby, near Selby

For a time Selby was the leading coal-mining area in the UK and featured some of the most advanced mining technology in Europe. It was the first new mine in the UK for decades and seen as a rejoinder to widespread concern that the British mining industry was effectively shutting down, particularly following the defeat of the 1984–85 miners' strike.

Wistow Colliery, which was part of the Selby Coalfield, holds the UK record for coal mined in one week—200,743 tonnes in 1995. The 110 square miles (280 km^{2}) Selby Complex, employing 3,000 miners plus contractors and ancillary staff, closed on Friday 14 May 2004 despite rising demand for coal in the UK. UK Coal, the pit's owner, said closure was due to rising costs caused by deteriorating geological conditions and the falling price of coal. In its final years the company listed a £30 million loss on the plant.

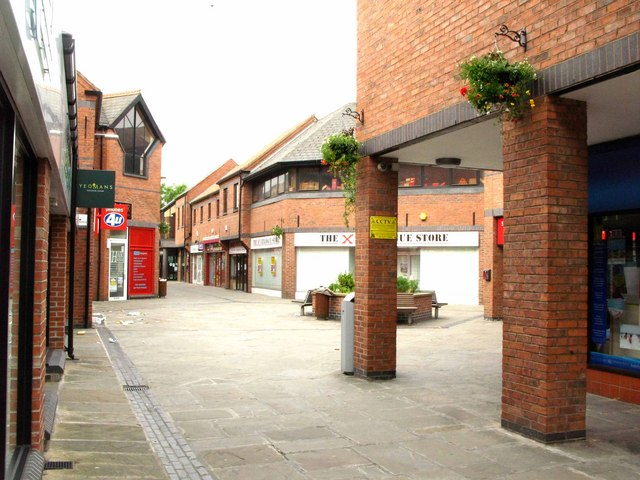
Market Cross in central Selby

Although much of the infrastructure of shipbuilding and coal mining remains both in and around Selby, both industries have long since been defunct. Now the main income for the area is derived from arable farming and as a commuter area for Leeds, Wakefield and York.

In recent years Selby has seen the development of new shopping areas both in the town centre and on the outskirts. The Abbey Walk Shopping Centre was developed on recreational land that runs parallel to the town centre. The expansion not only increased the volume of town-centre shops but also provided large-scale, convenient parking for the town centre. In more recent years the Three Lakes Retail Park has opened on the outskirts of town and continues to expand. Two of the town's supermarkets, Tesco and Morrisons, are looking to expand their stores, the latter meaning the resiting of the Abbey Primary School.

On 14 September 2005, Selby District Council was conditionally granted outline planning permission for a state of the art science facility to be built on the site of Burn Gliding Club but these plans did not come to fruition.

== Transport ==
Selby railway station

Selby is the transport hub for the local area; it has a bus and railway station running services to many places around the area.

Train services from Selby railway station run directly to London King's Cross, Leeds, Liverpool Lime Street, Manchester Piccadilly, York and Hull. Services are operated by several train operating companies; these are London North Eastern Railway, Northern Trains, TransPennine Express and Hull Trains.

Bus services are operated predominantly by Arriva Yorkshire, which runs a range of local services, as well as longer-distance routes to Goole, Leeds, Pontefract, Wakefield and York. Thornes Independent operate two routes to Hensall and Hemingbrough.

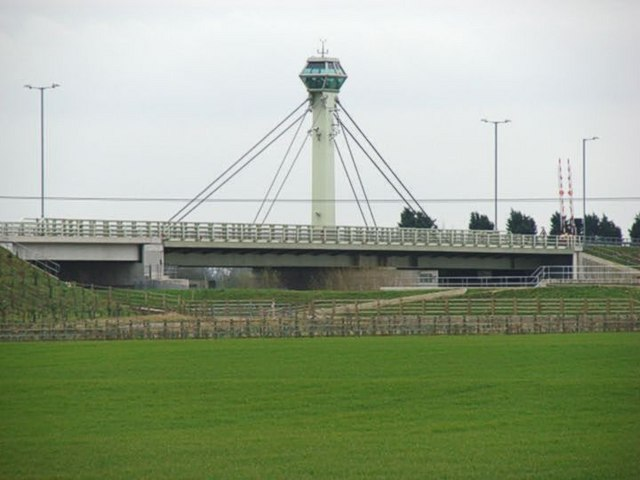
The Ouse Swing Bridge

In July 2001, construction began on the Selby by-pass, which had been authorised for development in 1993. The by-pass runs from the A19 at Barlby, along the southern perimeter of Selby, joining the A63 at Thorpe Willoughby. The project was delayed owing to technical difficulties with the swing bridge over the River Ouse, but was eventually completed in July 2004.

The Selby Canal connects the town to the Aire and Calder Navigation and the Ouse. It is maintained for navigation and today is mainly used for leisure.

== Education ==
Primary education is provided by several schools in and around the town, including Selby Abbey Church of England Voluntary Controlled Primary School on New Lane.

Secondary education is provided locally by Selby High School and Brayton Academy.

Further and higher education, apprenticeships and adult learning are offered by Selby College on Abbot’s Road. On 1 March 2022 Selby College and Wakefield College merged to form the Heart of Yorkshire Education Group, which oversees campuses in Selby, Castleford and Wakefield.

== Culture and landmarks ==
Selby Abbey is the town’s main landmark. The abbey church is Grade I listed and retains significant medieval and later fabric. Inside is the so-called Washington Window, a fourteenth-century pane depicting the arms of the Washington family. The design has been linked to the later design of the flag of the United States.

On Water Lane the Abbot's Staith Buildings, a medieval warehouse complex associated with the abbey’s administration of trade, are listed at Grade II*. In the Market Place the nineteenth-century Market Cross is a local landmark and is Grade II listed.

The Selby Railway Swing Bridge, dating back to the late nineteenth-century, carries the railway across the River Ouse and holds Grade II listed status. It’s particularly noted for its distinctive wrought-iron structure and the original hydraulic machinery that still forms part of its engineering character.

Selby Town Hall has been running a music venue since 2003, with regular performances of music, dance, drama and comedy and local band nights, with an annual Battle Of The Bands final, which in 2009 sold out in 12 hours, seeing local band Leonard's Revenge crowned victors.

There have been four cinemas in Selby, with the last one closing in the early 1980s. In 2009 a community group established a cinema project called Selby Globe.

== Sport ==
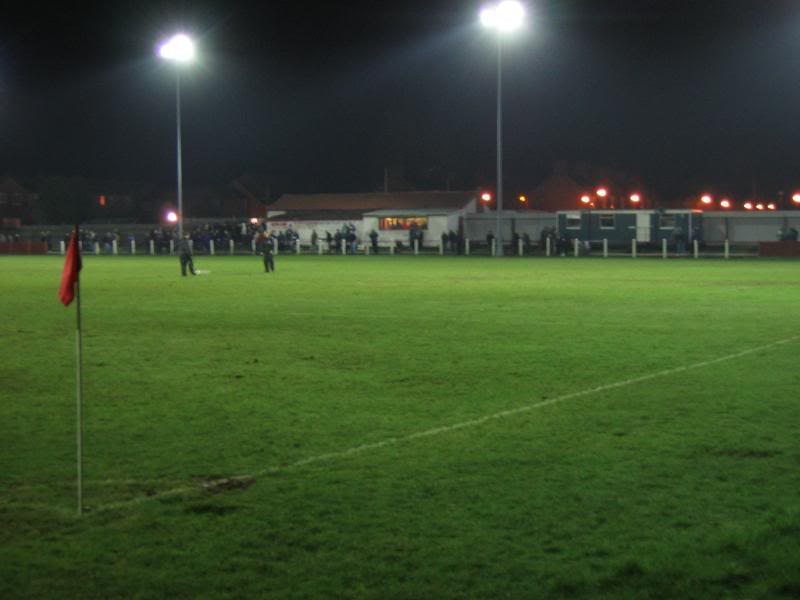
Flaxley Road

Selby's major sporting team is Selby Town F.C. ('the Robins'), playing in the Northern Counties East Division One at the Flaxley Road Stadium. As a result of a sponsorship deal with a local business, the stadium is now known as the Fairfax Plant Hire Stadium. The club was founded in 1919 and their most successful season was perhaps 1953–54, when they won the Yorkshire Football League and reached the first round of the FA Cup – meeting Bradford Park Avenue and getting their highest ever attendance of 7,000 fans.

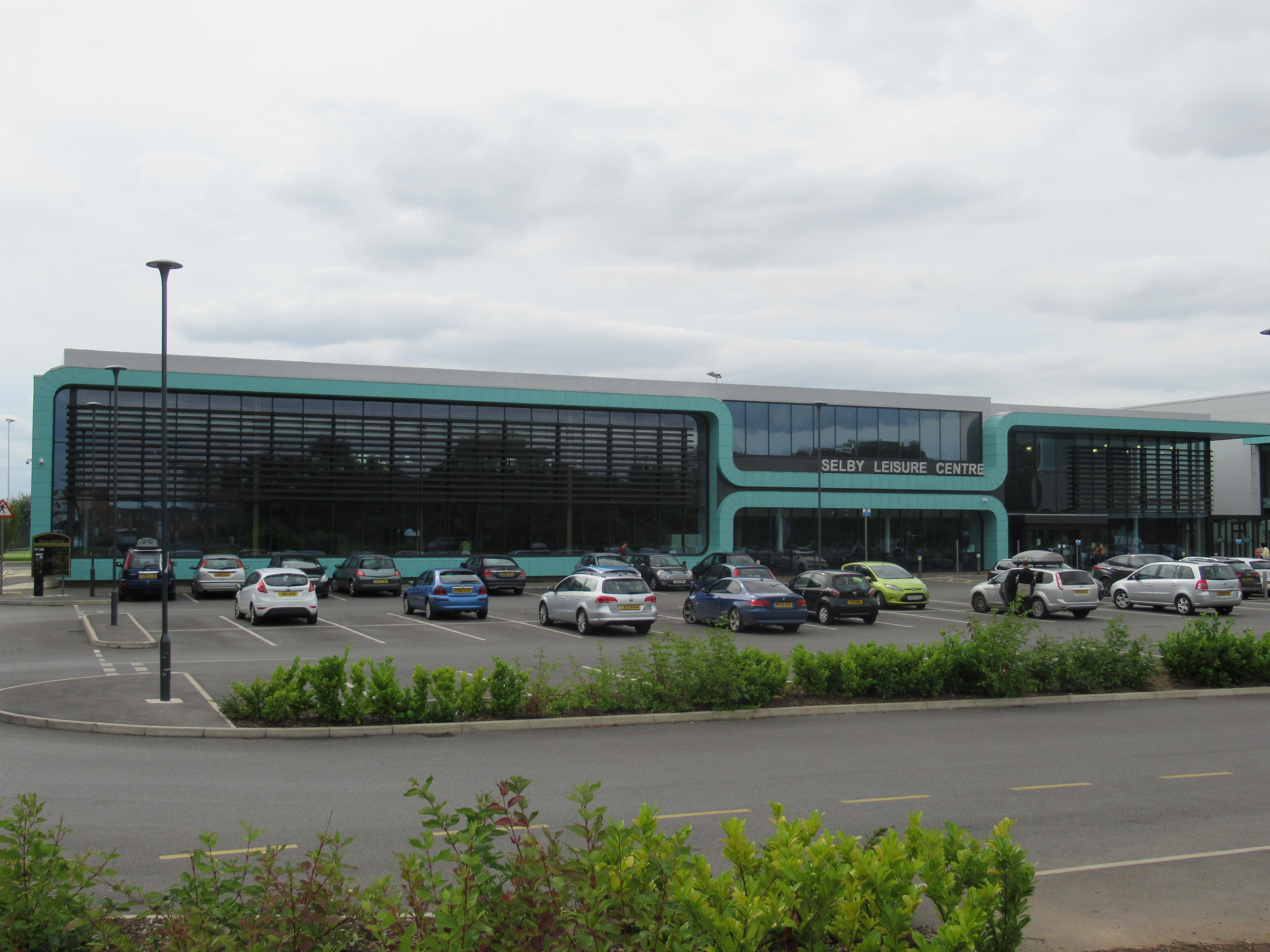
Selby Leisure Centre

A rugby union club, Selby RUFC, plays at Sandhill Lane Stadium. Sandhill Lane Stadium is currently undergoing construction work to create a new seating stand overlooking the first team's pitch, and a gym and new changing rooms are being added to the members' bar and existing club bar. Selby RUFC have five open-age teams and have veteran and junior set-ups. Selby 1st are currently in Yorkshire League Division One. In the season 2008–09 Selby U10s won the Gullivers Plate at Twickenham, the U16s got to the final of the Yorkshire Bowl and Selby 3rds reached a North Yorkshire final. Selby also has a rugby league club, Selby Warriors, which plays at The Rigid Containers Sports Ground, Foxhill Lane and the Selby Rugby League Referees Society.

Selby Cricket Club, formed in the nineteenth century and based at Sandhill Lane since 1936, has four senior league teams, with the 1st and 2nd XI playing in the York and District Senior League, the 1st XI in Division 4 and the 2nd XI in Division 5. The 3rd XI play in Division 4 and 4th XI play in Division 5 of the York Vale League. The team runs two junior teams, the under 11s and 15s, which both play in the York and District Junior League, and an evening league team in the Howdenshire Evening League (West Division).

Selby and District Motor Club has its own clubhouse at Breighton Airfield on Sand Lane. Meeting on Tuesday evenings, its members participate in Road Rallies, Stage Rallies, Sprints, Autotests and Production-Car Trials. Members discuss motor sporting events and regularly show videos. The club organises an annual Road Rally called the Three Swans Rally, based on local roads and forming a major part of local championships.

== Media ==
Local news and television programmes is provided by BBC Yorkshire and ITV Yorkshire from the Emley Moor TV transmitter, a local TV service is provided by That’s TV York on Freeview channel 8.

The town's local radio stations are BBC Radio York, Greatest Hits Radio Yorkshire, Capital Yorkshire, YO1 Radio, and Selby Radio which is a community based radio station.

Selby's longest-established newspaper is the Selby Times, founded in 1860, owned and published by Chronicle Publications along with its sister paper the Goole Times. The company previously owned the Selby Post and purchased the title from Johnston Press when they ceased publication of the paper in August 2013. Published weekly, the paper costs £1.00 and covers the Selby district, including the town centre and villages such as Sherburn-in-Elmet and as far as Tadcaster.

In 2014, despite the shift to online news, The Goole and Selby Times together were only one of three newspapers in the country actually to increase print sales. The Goole Times (incorporating the Selby Times) saw a rise of more than three quarters to 15,045 compared with the same period in 2013.

The Goole Times and Selby Times received an unprecedented 1,000 toys for their annual Christmas toy appeal in December 2017.

In 2019 The Selby Chronicle was relaunched as an online-only newspaper.

== Twin towns ==
Selby is twinned with:

- Carentan, France (since 1973).
- Filderstadt, Germany (agreement signed 2002–2003).
- Selby, Ontario, Canada, within the Town of Greater Napanee (twinning formalised 14 April 2022).

== Notable people ==
- Henry I of England (c. 1068–1135), king of England.
- Smithson Tennant (1761–1815), chemist who identified the elements osmium and iridium. Born in Selby, with a blue plaque on Finkle Street.
- Jonathan Hutchinson (1828–1913), surgeon and pathologist. Born in Selby, later founder of the Haslemere Educational Museum.
- John Sherwood (1945–2025), 400 m hurdler and Olympic bronze medallist (1968). Born in Selby.
- James Stephenson (1889–1941), stage and film actor. Born in Selby.
- Robert of Selby (died 1152), English courtier and later chancellor in the Kingdom of Sicily. His byname indicates likely origin in Selby.
- Gavin Harding (born 1978), councillor and disability campaigner. Became Mayor of Selby in 2015 and is recognised as the first person with a learning disability to hold a UK mayoralty.
- Harold Brigham, footballer. Born in Selby and later a Football League player.
- Nigel Adams, former Member of Parliament for Selby and Ainsty (2010–2023).
- Robert Aske, lawyer and leader of the Pilgrimage of Grace. From the Aske family of Aughton near Selby.
- Jack Byers, footballer. Born in Selby, played in the Football League in the interwar era.
- Arthur Hinsley, Roman Catholic cardinal, Archbishop of Westminster. Born at Carlton near Selby.
- Woods Hutchinson, physician and writer. Born in Selby, later moved to the United States.
- Thomas Johnson (c. 1600–1644), apothecary and botanist, known as the “father of British field botany”. Born in Selby.
- Keith Kelly, pop singer and guitarist (The John Barry Seven, solo UK hits in 1960). Born in Selby.
- Steve Sherwood, footballer. Born in Selby, goalkeeper for Chelsea, Watford and others.
- Eden Taylor-Draper, actress (Emmerdale), Selby-born.
- Matthew Warchus, theatre and film director, grew up in Selby.
- Leigh Wood, footballer, born in Selby, played for York City and Harrogate Town.
- Benedict of Auxerre (also called Benedict of Selby), first abbot of Selby Abbey.
- Graeme Hall (born 1966), dog trainer and television presenter, born in Selby and known for Channel 5's Dogs Behaving (Very) Badly.
- Cathy Rentzenbrink (born 1972), writer and broadcaster; raised on the Selby coalfield and author of the memoir The Last Act of Love.

== See also ==
- Listed buildings in Selby
- Selby and District DIAL
- Selby College
- Selby High School
- Selby (UK Parliament constituency)
- Selby District
