= Selby High School =

Location
- Leeds Road; Selby, North Yorkshire, YO8 4HT; England; 53.7807°N 1.0787°W

Information
- Type: Community school
- Motto: In Arduis Fidelis "Faithful in adversity".
- Established: 1908
- Local authority: North Yorkshire Council
- Department for Education URN: 121702 Tables
- Ofsted: Reports
- Principal: Nick Hinchliffe
- Age: 11 to 16
- Enrolment: c. 1100
- Houses: Garrett, Hockney, Mason and Palin
- Colours: Grey (Year 7 – 8) and Black (9–11)
- Website: www.selbyhigh.co.uk

Selby High School is a co-educational secondary school in North Yorkshire, England. Its main catchment area is the town of Selby and villages from the Selby District, including Thorpe Willoughby, Hambleton, Monk Fryston, Cawood and Wistow.

== History ==
Selby High School links back to Selby Grammar School, founded in 1908 as an all-girls school as Selby High School. In 1967 this changed to the Selby Grammar School grammar school and became coeducational, and in 1979, a mixed comprehensive school. The comprehensive was renamed Selby High School.

== Buildings ==
In 2003 Selby High School began fundraising towards securing specialist school status – the school was awarded specialist status in Performing and Visual Arts in 2005. Following this the school built a dance studio, a 325-seat theatre stand and an all-weather pitch. In September 2010 the school was awarded specialist status in Science. The school maintains these specialisms in the present day. In January 2013 the school added an ICT suite with new computers. In 2017 it added the Eckersley Centre, named after the previous headmaster, Paul Eckersley.

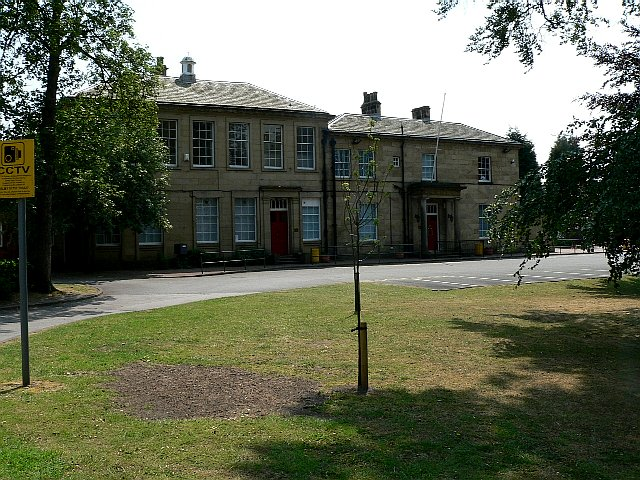
School building

== Notable former pupils ==
- Nigel Adams – former MP for Selby and Ainsty (attended the school 1978–84)
- Gareth Ellis – rugby league England international who played for Hull F.C.
- Gerard Jones – professional football coach and entrepreneur (attended the school 2000-05)
- Matthew Warchus – theatre and film director (attended the school 1978–84)

=== Selby Grammar School ===
- Dianne Bevan (nee Roe), Chief Operating Officer from 2007–12 of the National Assembly for Wales
- Sir John Townsley, educator (attended the school 1976–1982)

=== Selby Girls' High School ===
- Prof Judy Armitage FRS, Professor of Biochemistry since 1996 at the University of Oxford (Merton College)

== Former teachers ==
- Mollie Blake, Headmistress from 1975–83 of Manchester High School for Girls (head teacher of the girls' high school from 1960–68, and the grammar school from 1968–75) and the first President of the Secondary Heads Association in 1978
- Joan Firth CB, Chair of Bradford Health Authority from 1998–2000 (Head of Science from 1960–62 at the girls' high school)
- Brian Sherratt, head of Religious Studies at the grammar school from 1967–70
