= Andrew Gray (lawyer) =

British lawyer and political activist

Andrew Philip Gray
- Born: Andrew Philip Gray; 1979 (age 45–46)
- Organization: Suffrago

Andrew Philip Gray (born 1979) is a British lawyer, businessman, and political activist. In June 2023, he became one of the world's first political candidates to use a form of artificial intelligence to set his manifesto pledges when standing as an independent candidate in the July 2023 Selby and Ainsty by-election.

== Election campaign ==
In June 2023, Gray announced he would be running as a candidate in the Selby and Ainsty by-election, stating an intention to be the first UK Member of Parliament to be "powered by AI".

The basis of this claim was Gray's widely reported use of an AI tool called Polis, "a real-time system for gathering, analyzing and understanding what large groups of people think in their own words, enabled by advanced statistics and machine learning."

At the time of Gray's campaign, Polis had already been used within a political context, most notably by the Taiwanese government to inform policy agendas. Gray himself had been using the system since January 2022 to assist with the resolution of issues local to Harrogate, including controversial plans to expand Harrogate Spring Water's bottling plant into local woodland.

However, Gray's July 2023 election campaign is the first recorded instance of a political candidate using an AI-powered system to set their manifesto.

During the campaign, the system received between 7,500 and 8,000 votes "cast by 275 people in 46 Polis discussion groups."

Gray's campaign was ultimately unsuccessful. Labour Party candidate Keir Mather won the seat with a 46% share of the vote.

Gray promised to turn over the data gathered through the Polis system to the victorious candidate.

Keegan McBride of the Oxford Internet Institute dismissed Gray's campaign as part of a prevalent "techno-utopian type view on democracy", adding that "democracy isn't going to be fixed by a new technology or a new digital system or artificial intelligence or anything like that, because it's not a technological problem. It's a sociological one."

After the campaign, Gray himself admitted that the concept was 'new fangled' to most people and had caused confusion amongst constituents, stating that people messaging him often thought he was a bot.

== Other activism ==
In 2022, Gray brought a discrimination claim under the Equality Act 2010 against Nuffield Health, seeking the implementation of lower gym fees for people with disabilities. As a result of the claim, Nuffield announced they would establish an independent committee to assess applications by people with disabilities for reduced rates.

In October 2021, Gray joined a campaign to remove Philip Allott from his role as North Yorkshire Police, Fire and Crime Commissioner, following comments made by Allott in relation to the murder of Sarah Everard. Allott resigned on 14 October 2021.

== Personal life ==
Gray is a Quaker. Truth Legal, a law firm founded by Gray in 2012, is listed as a Quaker business.
