= Nigel Adams =

British politician (born 1966)

The Right Honourable Nigel Adams
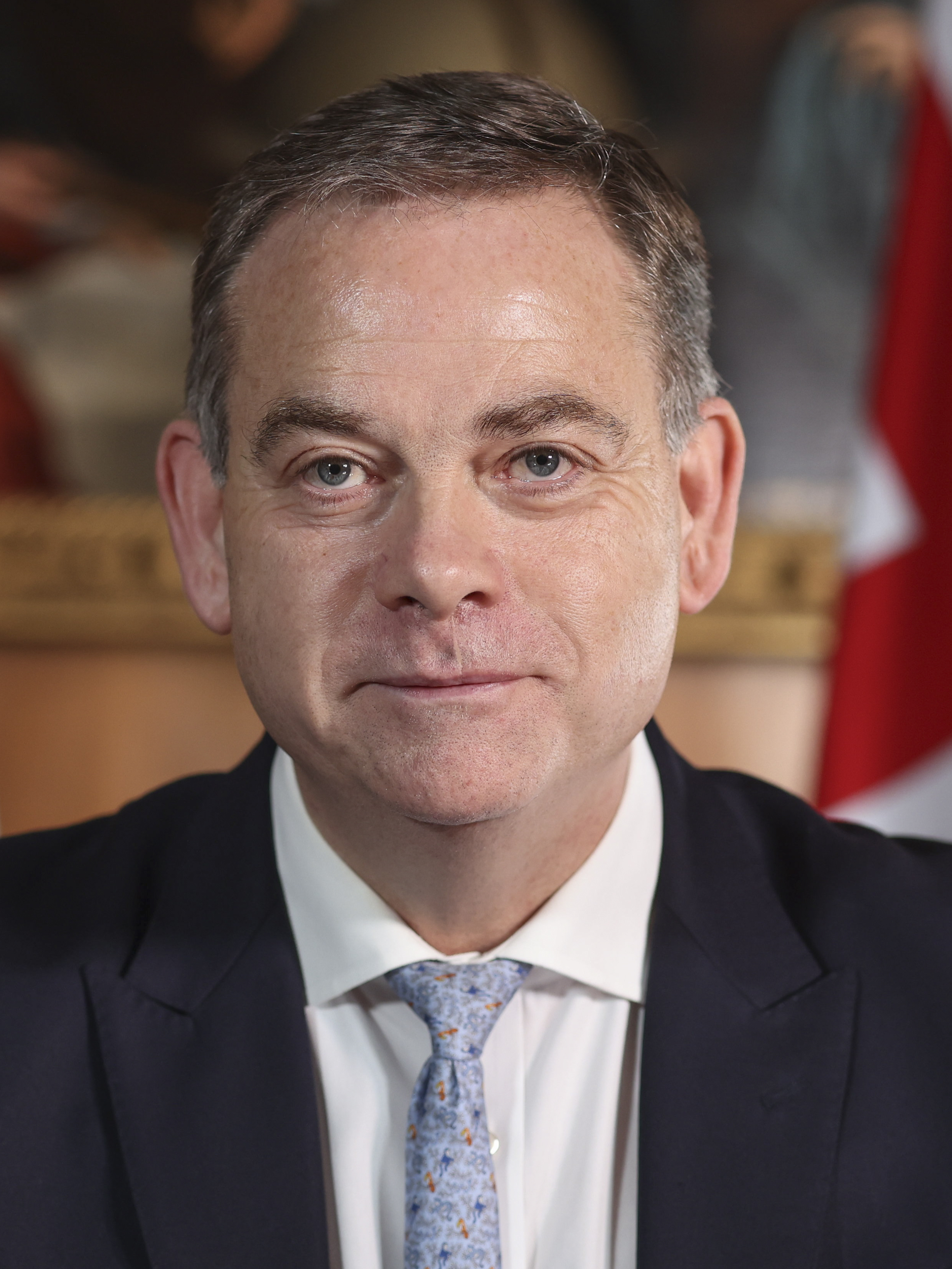
- Official portrait, 2021

Minister of State without Portfolio
- In office 15 September 2021 – 5 September 2022
- Prime Minister: Boris Johnson
- Preceded by: Chloe Smith
- Succeeded by: Gavin Williamson

Minister of State for Asia
- In office 13 February 2020 – 15 September 2021
- Prime Minister: Boris Johnson
- Preceded by: Heather Wheeler
- Succeeded by: Amanda Milling

Minister of State for Sport, Media and Creative Industries
- In office 24 July 2019 – 13 February 2020
- Prime Minister: Boris Johnson
- Preceded by: Margot James
- Succeeded by: Nigel Huddleston (Note: Succeeded by Huddleston as sport minister. Succeeded by John Whittingdale as Minister of State for Media and Data and Caroline Dinenage as Minister of State for Digital and Culture.)

Parliamentary Under-Secretary of State for Wales
- In office 5 November 2018 – 3 April 2019
- Prime Minister: Theresa May
- Preceded by: Mims Davies
- Succeeded by: Kevin Foster

Lord Commissioner of the Treasury
- In office 9 January 2018 – 5 November 2018
- Prime Minister: Theresa May
- Preceded by: Andrew Griffiths
- Succeeded by: Jeremy Quin

Member of Parliament for Selby and Ainsty
- In office 6 May 2010 – 12 June 2023
- Preceded by: Constituency created
- Succeeded by: Keir Mather

Personal details
- Born: 30 November 1966 (age 59) Goole, West Riding of Yorkshire, England
- Party: Conservative
- Spouse: Claire Robson
- Children: 4
- Education: Selby High School
- Website: www.selbyandainsty.com

Nigel Adams (born 30 November 1966) is a British former politician who served as Minister of State without Portfolio at the Cabinet Office from 2021 to 2022. A member of the Conservative Party, he was Member of Parliament (MP) for Selby and Ainsty from 2010 until his resignation in 2023.

== Early life ==
Adams was born in Goole, Yorkshire in 1966 and raised in Selby. He is the son of a school caretaker and school cleaner. Adams attended Camblesforth Primary School and Selby Grammar School. In 1994, with a £20 a week Enterprise Allowance Scheme Government grant, he co-founded Advanced Digital Telecom, which was sold for £3.1 million to JWE Telecom in 1999.

== Political career ==
Adams joined the Conservative Party in 1992.

Following his successful re-election in June 2017, he was appointed Assistant Government Whip. His departmental responsibilities included Department for Environment, Food and Rural Affairs (DEFRA) and Northern Ireland Office (NIO). Following the Government reshuffle in January 2018, he was promoted to Lord Commissioner to HM Treasury in the Government Whips Office. He was appointed Parliamentary Under Secretary of State for Communities and Local Government in May 2018, continuing to act as Lord Commissioner to HM Treasury alongside his ministerial duties.

In 2016, Adams was one of the key figures in the unsuccessful Conservative Party leadership bid by Boris Johnson. Adams appeared in the 2017 BBC docudrama Theresa vs. Boris: How May became PM.

He contested the marginal Rossendale and Darwen seat at the 2005 general election, coming second with a swing to the Conservatives of 1.9% compared to the 3.1% average they achieved nationally. Adams was then selected as the candidate for the Conservative Party in the newly created seat of Selby and Ainsty in 2006. Four years later at the 2010 general election, Adams was elected with a 23.71% majority.

Following his election to Parliament, Adams was appointed parliamentary private secretary to the Leader of the House of Lords and the Chancellor of the Duchy of Lancaster, The Lord Strathclyde, and subsequently to his successor, The Lord Hill of Oareford until his resignation in August 2014. In September 2014 Adams was appointed to the Number 10 Policy Board with responsibility for economic affairs.

Adams was re-elected as Member of Parliament for Selby and Ainsty at the 2015 general election with 27,725 votes, a majority of 13,557 votes and 52.5% of the total votes cast, a swing from Labour of 1.0% compared to a negative national swing of 0.4%. He was re-elected again at the snap election on 8 June 2017 with 32,921 votes and an increased majority and vote share of 13,772 and 58.7% respectively.

In January 2016, the Labour Party unsuccessfully proposed an amendment in Parliament that would have required private landlords to make their homes "fit for human habitation". According to Parliament's register of interests, Adams was one of 72 Conservative MPs who voted against the amendment who personally derived an income from renting out property. The Conservative Government had responded to the amendment that they believed homes should be fit for human habitation but did not want to pass the new law that would explicitly require it.

Until June 2017, Adams was Chairman of the All-Party Parliamentary Biomass Group and in 2013 he wrote an article describing the benefits of biomass. He regards wind and solar generation as relatively expensive and inflexible methods of renewable energy. Whilst coal is reliable and available, it is not renewable and converts inactive carbon stored underground into carbon dioxide thus increasing CO_{2} levels. Drax power station in his constituency is a major UK electricity producer capable of burning biomass. A second power station in the constituency at Eggborough, also capable of burning biomass, closed in 2018 and was subsequently demolished.

In January 2015, Adams introduced the Onshore wind subsidies (abolition) bill to Parliament which passed to the next stage following a close vote.

Until June 2017, Adams was Chairman of the All Party Group for Music and in November 2015 he instigated several Parliamentary debates on the difficulties facing UK musicians accessing visas for touring the US. The group has additionally held a session on the State of Access report aimed at improving access to live music for deaf and disabled people. Adams has campaigned to change the law on Secondary Ticketing and he successfully persuaded the government to outlaw the use of bots for the purpose of purchasing event tickets for resale. He also successfully lobbied to outlaw the use of flares and fireworks at music events and festivals. He was Secretary of the All-Party Parliamentary Group on Industrial Heritage.

Adams was in favour of Brexit prior to the 2016 referendum.

In March 2017, Adams was instructed to apologise to the House of Commons after the Commons Committee on Standards ruled that he had breached the MPs' code of conduct by failing to declare his interest in a telecommunications company while taking part in parliamentary inquiries relating to the industry.

He had previous held various government ministerial posts. These have included as an Assistant Government Whip on two occasions (June 2017 to January 2018, November 2018 to April 2019), Parliamentary Under-Secretary of State for Wales and Minister for Sport, Media and Creative Industries.

On 13 February 2020, Adams was appointed Minister of State for Asia during the first cabinet reshuffle of the second Johnson ministry.

On 16 September 2021, Adams was appointed Minister of State without Portfolio at the Cabinet Office during the cabinet reshuffle.

In April 2022, Adams announced his intention to stand down at the 2024 general election.

On 5 September 2022, following the election of Liz Truss as Leader of the Conservative Party, Adams resigned his position as Minister of State without Portfolio.

Adams announced his intention to "stand down" as a Member of Parliament on 10 June 2023, following the resignations of former Prime Minister, Boris Johnson and Nadine Dorries MP. On 12 June 2023 the Chancellor of the Exchequer appointed Adams Steward and Bailiff of the Manor of Northstead, a procedural device which allows an MP to resign from the House of Commons.

In July 2023, Keir Mather of the Labour Party won his seat on the largest swing in a by-election since the 1994 Dudley West by-election (and the second largest ever swing to Labour in a by-election since 1945), even as the Labour candidate in Uxbridge and South Ruislip and failed to win a by-election held there on the same day.

== Constituency issues ==
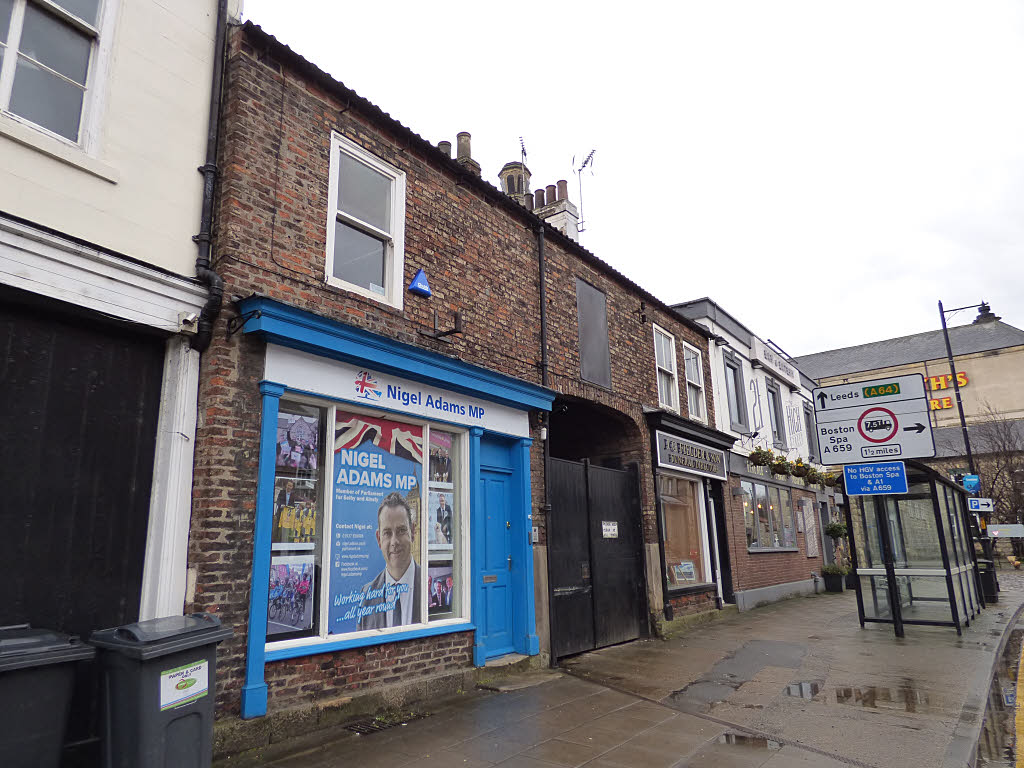
Adams' constituency office in Tadcaster; the second largest town in his constituency

- In November 2013, Adams gained praise from the Chancellor, George Osborne, for successfully leading the campaign to restore the concessionary coal allowance to retired coal miners, who had their allowance stopped following the collapse of UK Coal.
- In December 2014, Adams and Mark Crane, leader of Selby District Council, successfully lobbied race organisers for Selby District to host a stage of the international cycle race known as the Tour de Yorkshire.
- He was Vice Chairman of the All-Party Parliamentary Beer Group, as Tadcaster in the Selby and Ainsty constituency is a brewing town with Heineken, Molson Coors and Samuel Smith Old Brewery.
- In October 2015, The Daily Telegraph highlighted problems associated with a private company's recycled waste. The company had gone bankrupt and Adams was pictured in Great Heck where a tip with up to 10,000 tons of "stinking" and steaming household waste was said to be making people sick.

== Expenses ==
Between 2011 and 2012, Adams claimed the Independent Parliamentary Standards Authority (IPSA) approved accommodation allowance of £26,144 against a maximum annual allowance of £27,875 based on having four children living with him in London, whilst also claiming his family live in Yorkshire. Critics pointed out the coalition government removed support for other families earning £60,000. Since his election in 2010, his average accommodation costs have been £21,468.36 per year against a maximum annual allowance of £27,875.00.

== Donations ==
In 2015, Adams voted against plain cigarette packaging in the Tobacco Products Regulation motion. He had previously accepted £1,188 in hospitality from Japan Tobacco International during the 2012 Chelsea Flower Show. The Telegraph reported that Adams had received a total of £60,000 in tobacco industry hospitality from 2010 to 2015.

He was criticised by Greenpeace for promoting biomass as an energy source after accepting more than £50,000 in political donations and hospitality from companies in the biomass sector.

== Personal life ==
Adams is married to Claire (née Robson) who worked part-time as his office manager on a salary just under £20,000. The couple have four children.

He is a patron of the Selby Hands of Hope charity. A cricket enthusiast, he is active on the Yorkshire committee of the Lord's Taverners. While playing for the Lords and Commons Cricket team against the MCC at Lord's in 2013, he scored an unbeaten century.

Adams has served as a governor at two of his former schools, Camblesforth Primary School (2002–04) and Selby High School (2007–11).

== Notes ==
Parliament of the United Kingdom
New constituency	Member of Parliament for Selby and Ainsty; 2010–2023	Succeeded by Keir Mather
Political offices
Preceded by Andrew Griffiths	Lord Commissioner of the Treasury; 2018	Succeeded by Jeremy Quin
Preceded by Mims Davies	Parliamentary Under-Secretary of State for Wales; 2018–2019	Succeeded by Kevin Foster
Preceded by Margot James	Minister of State for Sport, Media and Creative Industries; 2019–2020	Succeeded by Nigel Huddleston; John Whittingdale
Preceded by Heather Wheeler as Parliamentary Under-Secretary of State for Asia and the Pacific	Minister of State for Asia; 2020–2021	Succeeded by Amanda Milling
Preceded by Chloe Smith as Minister of State for the Constitution and Devolution	Minister of State without Portfolio; 2021–2022	Vacant Title next held by Gavin Williamson
