= 2023 Selby and Ainsty by-election =

UK parliamentary by-election

- 20 July 2023

Selby and Ainsty constituency
- Registered: 80,150
- Turnout: 44.8% (▼27.2 pp)
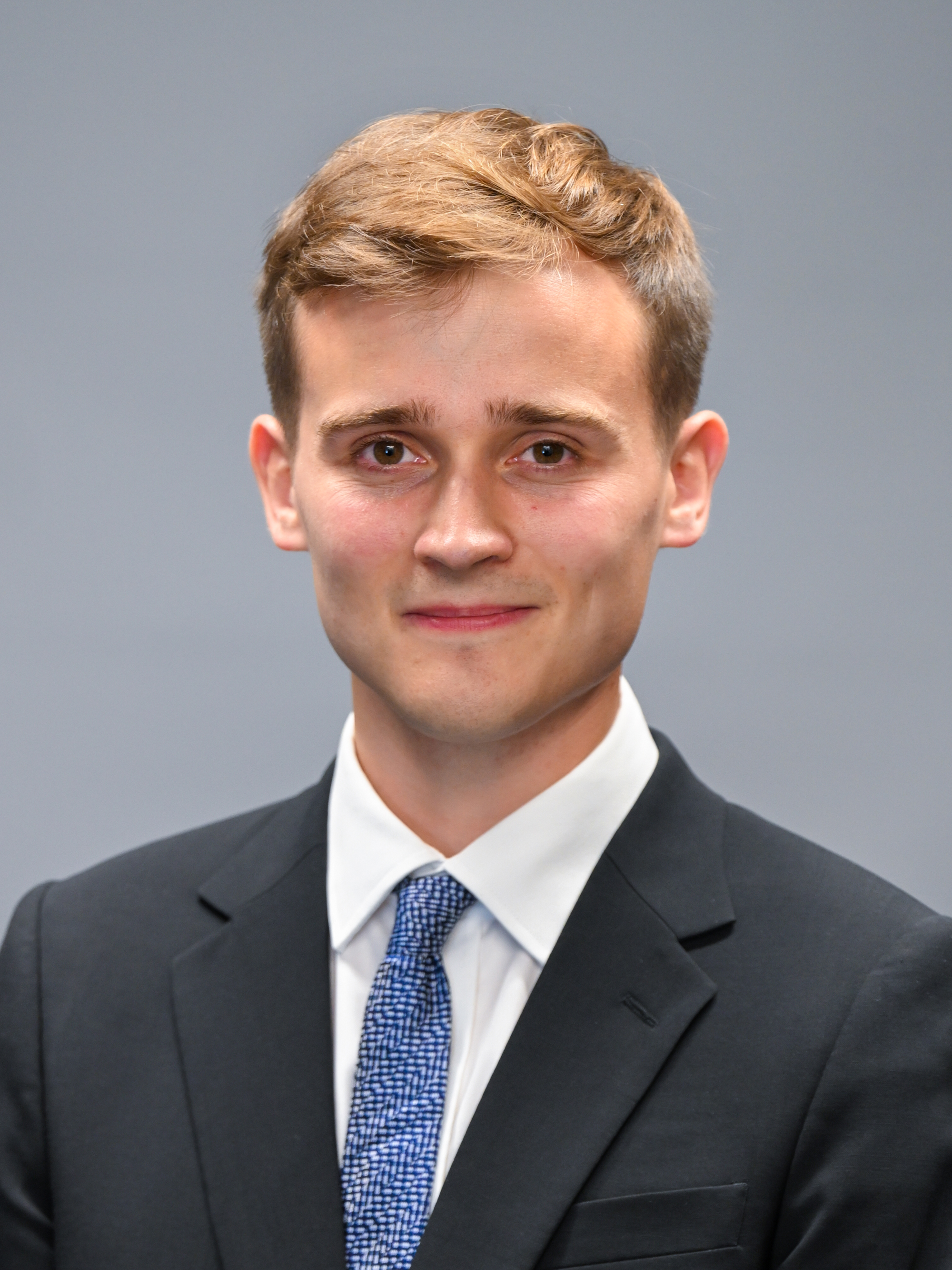

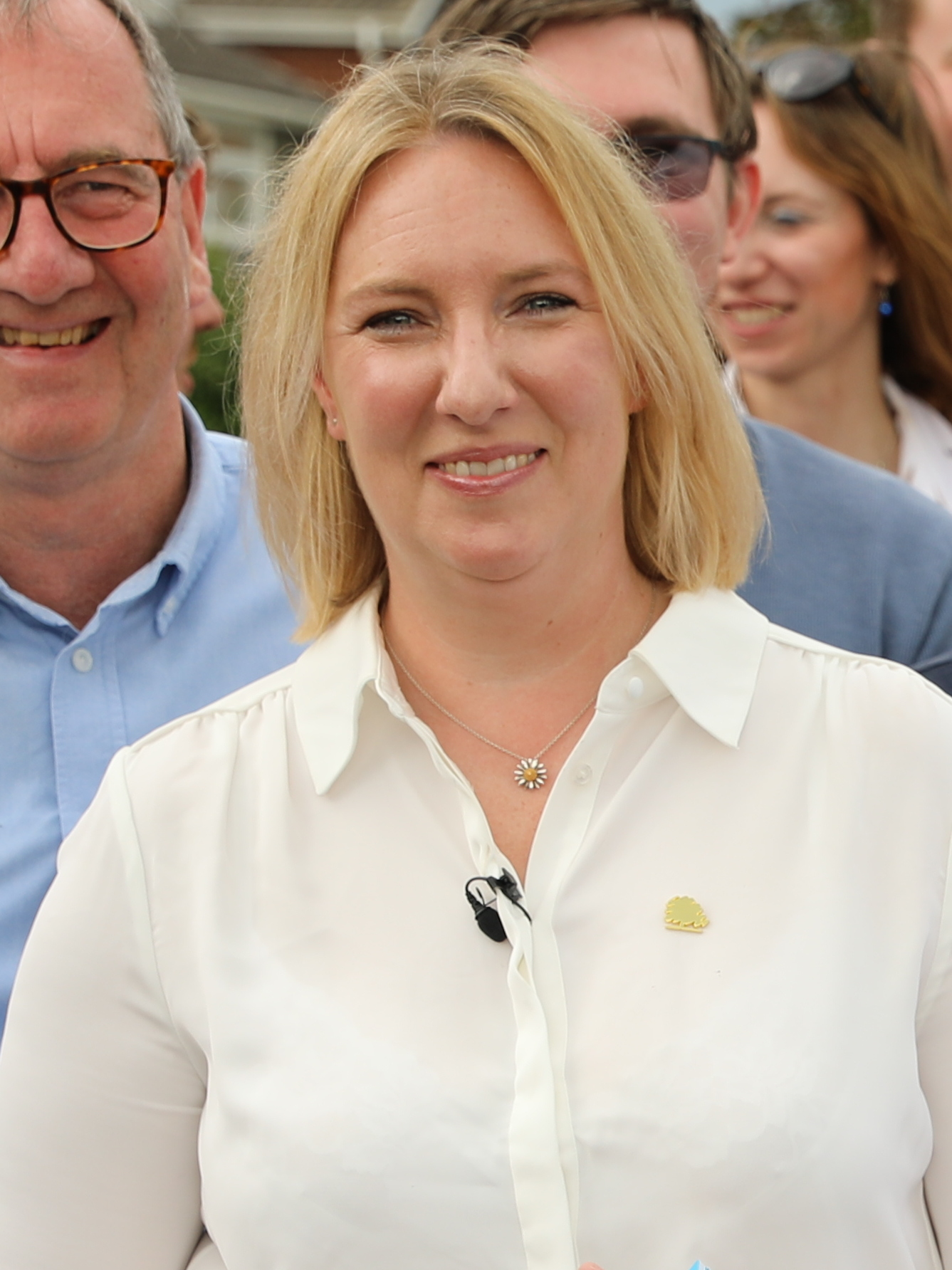
	First party	Second party	Third party
			Grn
Candidate	Keir Mather	Claire Holmes	Arnold Warneken
Party	Labour	Conservative	Green
Popular vote	16,456	12,295	1,838
Percentage	46.0%	34.3%	5.1%
Swing	▲21.4 pp	▼26.0 pp	▲1.9 pp
MP before election
Nigel Adams
Conservative
Elected MP
Keir Mather
Labour

A by-election for the United Kingdom parliamentary constituency of Selby and Ainsty was held on 20 July 2023, following resignation of incumbent Conservative Party member of Parliament (MP) Nigel Adams. Keir Mather of the Labour Party won the seat, setting a record for the largest majority ever overturned by the party in a by-election at the time.

The 2023 Somerton and Frome by-election and 2023 Uxbridge and South Ruislip by-election were held on the same day; the Labour candidate in the later failed to win in the seat despite it being much more marginal than Selby and Ainsty.

At the time, this was the second-largest swing to Labour in a by-election since 1945, behind only Dudley West in 1994, but it was then exceeded in the 2023 Tamworth by-election held in the following October and now stands as the third-largest; the 2023 Mid Bedfordshire by-election held the same day would also see Labour overturn a larger majority than in Selby.

== Background ==
Selby and Ainsty is a rural constituency in North Yorkshire, covering the former District of Selby (defunct since 2023). The only towns are the namesake market town of Selby and the smaller towns of Tadcaster and Sherburn in Elmet. The rural areas of the seat include parts of the ancient wapentake of the Ainsty of York and villages such as Camblesforth and Eggborough. Since boundary changes in advance of the 2010 election, Selby and Ainsty had been considered a "traditional Tory safe seat".

Incumbent MP Nigel Adams had been a close ally of former Prime Minister Boris Johnson. He had served as the constituency's MP since its creation in 2010 and had most recently defended it in 2019 with a majority of just over 20,000 votes relative to his nearest competitor. He resigned as an MP one day after Johnson did, an action which itself triggered a by-election in Uxbridge and South Ruislip; Adams had previously rejected the idea he would stand down as an MP early. He had been expected to receive a peerage as part of Boris Johnson's resignation honours, but had been removed from the final list by the House of Lords Appointments Commission (HOLAC).

The Sunday Times reported that, on 2 June 2023, Johnson met the incumbent Conservative Prime Minister, Rishi Sunak, and agreed to campaign for him if Sunak approved his honours list. A source close to Sunak denied any deal was agreed, but that Sunak said he would not interfere in the process. The list of proposed peerages went to the commission, which rejected several names, presumed to include Dorries and Adams, as they were serving MPs who were not planning to stand down imminently. This led to a row about whether arrangements could be made for Adams and the others. Johnson wanted Sunak to overrule the HOLAC or promise to give Adams, Dorries and Alok Sharma peerages later, but Sunak refused.

Adams had previously announced his intention to stand down as an MP at the 2024 general election, with the party having selected a candidate to succeed him the previous day. Adams formally confirmed his resignation on 12 June.

== Candidate selection ==
Lawyer Claire Holmes was selected as the Conservative candidate on 18 June. Michael Naughton, a Conservative Party candidate in the 2014 and 2019 European Parliament elections, had previously been selected as the Conservatives' PPC for the seat on 9 June, defeating Zak Khan and Andrew Lee for the nomination; journalist Sebastian Payne had also applied but did not make the shortlist. It subsequently emerged that Naughton had actually been selected for the new Selby constituency, the de facto successor seat to Selby and Ainsty for the next general election following boundary changes, and the selection of Naughton as the candidate for the by-election had therefore been run on incorrect boundaries, excluding party members that resided inside Selby and Ainsty, but outside of the future Selby constituency. The following day, Naughton stood down as the party's PPC for the redefined Selby seat, due to unrelated family matters.

On 15 June the Labour Party announced 25-year-old Keir Mather, who most recently worked at the Confederation of British Industry, as their candidate.

On 22 June the Liberal Democrats announced their candidate as Matt Walker, who works as a National Health Service manager and serves as a councillor on North Yorkshire Council.

On 14 June the Conservatives lost their majority on North Yorkshire Council following the resignation of one of their councillors. Mike Jordan, who represents the Camblesforth & Carlton ward in the Selby area, cited concerns about the party nationally for his reason for leaving the party. Jordan rejoined his old party, the Yorkshire Party, and was announced as the party's candidate in the by-election. However, Jordan is listed on the Statement of Persons Nominated with no party affiliation.

Arnold Warneken, a local councillor for Ouseburn ward, was selected for the Green Party on 11 June 2023. He had contested the seat for the party in the 2019 election.

David Kent stood for Reform UK while Guy Phoenix stood for the Heritage Party.

== Campaign ==
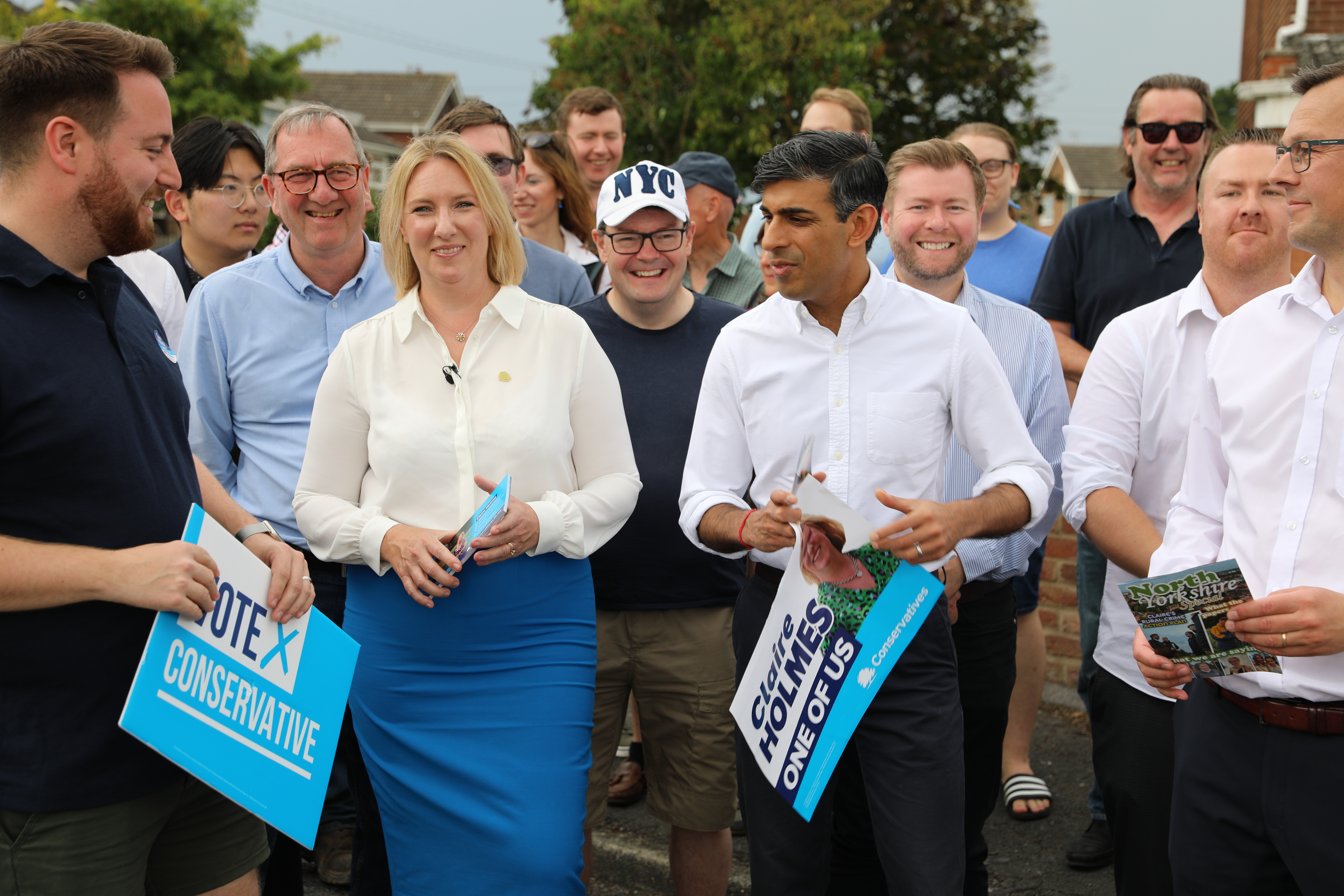
Candidate Holmes (front, centre left) and Prime Minister Sunak (front, centre right) campaigning in Selby and Ainsty

On 13 June, Labour Party National Campaign Coordinator Shabana Mahmood ruled out a Lib–Lab pact. Liberal Democrat leader Ed Davey had done the same on 10 June.

On 8 July, Prime Minister Rishi Sunak campaigned with the Conservative candidate Claire Holmes in Selby and Ainsty.

== Polling ==
An opinion poll conducted by J.L. Partners and commissioned by pressure group 38 Degrees, published on 6 July, found that Labour held a twelve-point lead over the Conservatives in the seat. Labour ultimately won the seat with a lead of 11.6 points over the Conservative candidate, a similar margin to that predicted by the poll.

Dates conducted	Pollster	Client	Sample size	Con	Lab	Lib Dems	Yorkshire	Green	Reform	Others	Lead
20 Jul 2023	2023 by-election		—	34.3%	46.0%	3.3%	4.2%	5.1%	3.7%	3.5%	11.7
26 Jun – 4 Jul 2023	JL Partners	38 Degrees	502	29%	41%	6%	4%	6%	8%	6%	12
12 Dec 2019	2019 general election		–	60.3%	24.6%	8.6%	3.4%	3.2%	–	–	35.7

== Result ==
Bar chart of the election result.

Thirteen candidates sought election. The full list was announced on 23 June 2023.

2023 Selby and Ainsty by-election
Party	Candidate	Votes	%	±%
Labour	Keir Mather	16,456	46.0	+21.4
Conservative	Claire Holmes	12,295	34.3	−26.0
Green	Arnold Warneken	1,838	5.1	+1.9
(Note: Jordan left the optional Description field blank on the registration form, but stood for the Yorkshire Party.)	Mike Jordan	1,503	4.2	+0.8
Reform	Dave Kent	1,332	3.7	New
Liberal Democrats	Matt Walker	1,188	3.3	−5.3
Independent	Nick Palmer	342	1.0	New
SDP	John Waterstone	314	0.9	New
Monster Raving Loony	Sir Archibald Stanton	172	0.5	New
Heritage	Guy Phoenix	162	0.5	New
(Note: Gray, an independent candidate, left the optional Description field blank on the registration form.)	Andrew Gray	99	0.3	New
Independent	Tyler Wilson-Kerr	67	0.2	New
Climate	Luke Wellock	39	0.1	New
Rejected ballots		69	0.2	
Registered electors		80,150		
Majority		4,161	11.7	N/A
Turnout		35,876	44.8	−27.2
Labour gain from Conservative		Swing	+23.7	

== Previous result ==
General election 2019: Selby and Ainsty
Party	Candidate	Votes	%	±%
Conservative	Nigel Adams	33,995	60.3	+1.6
Labour	Malik Rofidi	13,858	24.6	−9.5
Liberal Democrats	Katharine Macy	4,842	8.6	+4.5
Yorkshire	Mike Jordan	1,900	3.4	New
Green	Arnold Warneken	1,823	3.2	New
Majority		20,137	35.7	+10.1
Turnout		56,418	71.7	−2.4
Conservative hold		Swing	+5.5	
