= Camblesforth Hall =

Historic building in Camblesforth, England

Coordinates: 53°43′40″N 1°01′16″W

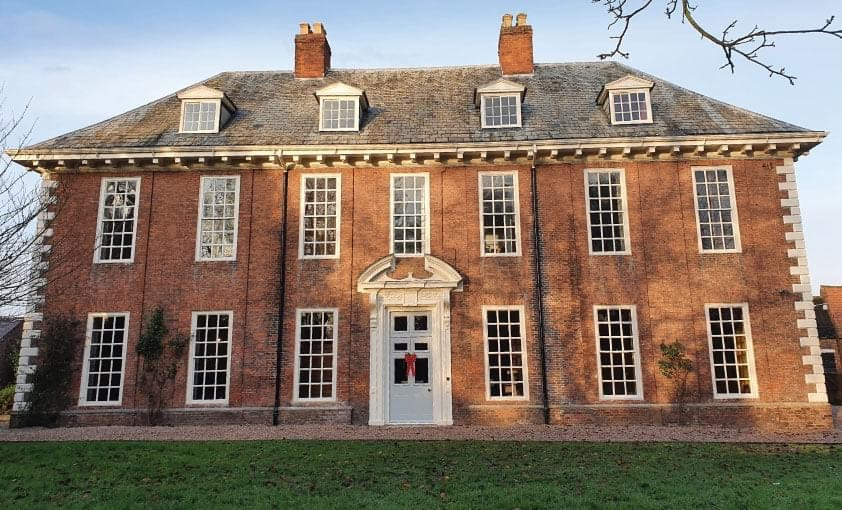
The building, in 2021

Camblesforth Hall is a historic building in Camblesforth, a village in North Yorkshire, in England.

The hall was built in about 1690, probably by John Etty, and extended on several occasions. By the 20th century, it was used as a farmhouse, and at some point was divided into two properties. It was Grade I listed in 1966. It became empty in about 2010, and fell into poor repair. In 2020 it was purchased by Naomi and Byron Ward, who restored the property. During the process, they discovered the name "Francis Mary Adams" scratched into the window, the name of a resident in the mid 18th century. Some of the renovation works were captured and featured on Channel 4 'Renovation Nation' in 2022. Since the restoration, it has been used as a wedding venue.

The house is built of reddish-brown brick on a plinth with stone coping, stone dressings, quoins, overhanging eaves with modillions, and a hipped slate roof with a central well. There are two storeys and attics, and seven bays. The central doorway has a moulded architrave, a frieze with floral scrolls, and a broken pediment on consoles. The windows are sashes with flat gauged brick arches, and in the attic are four pedimented dormers with horizontally-sliding sashes. At the rear is a large round-headed sash window with radial glazing, imposts and a keystone. On the east return is a doorway with a Gibbs surround and a devil mask keystone. Inside, much of the original interior survives, including the main and service staircases, much panelling, and many doors, plastered ceilings and fireplaces.

== See also ==
- Grade I listed buildings in North Yorkshire (district)
- Listed buildings in Camblesforth
