= Listed buildings in Thorpe Willoughby =

Thorpe Willoughby is a civil parish in the county of North Yorkshire, England. It contains two listed buildings that are recorded in the National Heritage List for England. Both the listed buildings are designated at Grade II, the lowest of the three grades, which is applied to "buildings of national importance and special interest". The parish contains the village of Thorpe Willoughby, and the listed buildings consist of a farmhouse and a milestone.

== Buildings ==
| Name and location | Photograph | Date | Notes |
|---|---|---|---|
| Barff Farmhouse; 53.76900°N 1.11961°W | | Late 18th to 19th century | The house is in brown brick with stone dressings, a modillion eaves cornice, and a Welsh slate roof with stone kneelers and gable coping. There are two storeys and three bays, a two-storey extension at the rear to the right, and an outshut. In the centre is a wooden trellis porch with bargeboards, and a doorway with a panelled surround, a rectangular fanlight, and a cornice. The windows are sashes with flat brick arches. |
| Milestone; 53.77403°N 1.12694°W | | Early 19th century {probable) | The milepost on the south side of Leeds Road (A1238 road) is in stone with a cast iron plaque. It has a triangular plan and a rounded top, and is about 0.75 metres (2 ft 6 in) in height. On the top is inscribed "SELBY AND LEEDS" and "TURNPIKE ROAD", the left side has the distance to Leeds, and on the right side is the distance to Selby. |
