= Listed buildings in Camblesforth =

Camblesforth is a civil parish in the county of North Yorkshire, England. It contains two listed buildings that are recorded in the National Heritage List for England. Of these, one is listed at Grade I, the highest of the three grades, and the other is at Grade II, the lowest grade. The parish contains the village of Camblesforth and the surrounding area. Both the listed buildings are in the village and consist of a country house and its dovecote.

== Key ==
Grade	Criteria
I	Buildings of exceptional interest, sometimes considered to be internationally important
II	Buildings of national importance and special interest

== Buildings ==
Name and location	Photograph	Date	Notes	Grade
Dovecote; 53.72777°N 1.02062°W	—	16th century	The dovecote to the east of Camblesforth Hall, which was partly rebuilt in the 19th century, is in reddish-brown brick with dressings in purple brick, some diapering, a dentilled eaves band, and a hipped Welsh slate roof. There are entrances on two sides, one with a segmental head, and on the south side are casement windows. Inside there are brick nesting boxes.	II
Camblesforth Hall; 53.72767°N 1.02120°W		c. 1700	A small country house in reddish-brown brick on a plinth with stone coping, stone dressings, quoins, overhanging eaves with modillions, and a hipped slate roof with a central well. There are two storeys and attics, and seven bays. The central doorway has a moulded architrave, a frieze with floral scrolls, and a broken pediment on consoles. The windows are sashes with flat gauged brick arches, and in the attic are four pedimented dormers with horizontally-sliding sashes. At the rear is a large round-headed sash window with radial glazing, imposts and a keystone. On the east return is a doorway with a Gibbs surround and a devil mask keystone.	I
