= Selby (constituency) =

UK Parliament constituency (1983–2010, 2024 onwards)

Coordinates: 53.76°N 1.14°W

- County constituency for the House of Commons
- Boundaries since 2024
- Boundary of Selby in Yorkshire and the Humber
- County: North Yorkshire/West Yorkshire; (North Yorkshire until 2010)
- Major settlements: Selby, Sherburn-in-Elmet, Kippax

Current constituency
- Created: 2024
- Member of Parliament: Keir Mather (Labour)
- Seats: One
- Created from: Selby and Ainsty; Elmet and Rothwell (part)

1983–2010
- Created from: Barkston Ash, Howden, Goole and Thirsk and Malton
- Replaced by: Selby and Ainsty, York Outer

Selby is a parliamentary constituency in North Yorkshire, represented in the House of Commons of the Parliament of the United Kingdom. It elects one Member of Parliament (MP) by the first past the post system of election. The constituency existed from 1983 to 2010 prior to reformation in 2024. It is currently held by Keir Mather of the Labour Party, who was first elected as an MP for the predecessor seat of Selby and Ainsty at a by-election in July 2023.

== Constituency profile ==
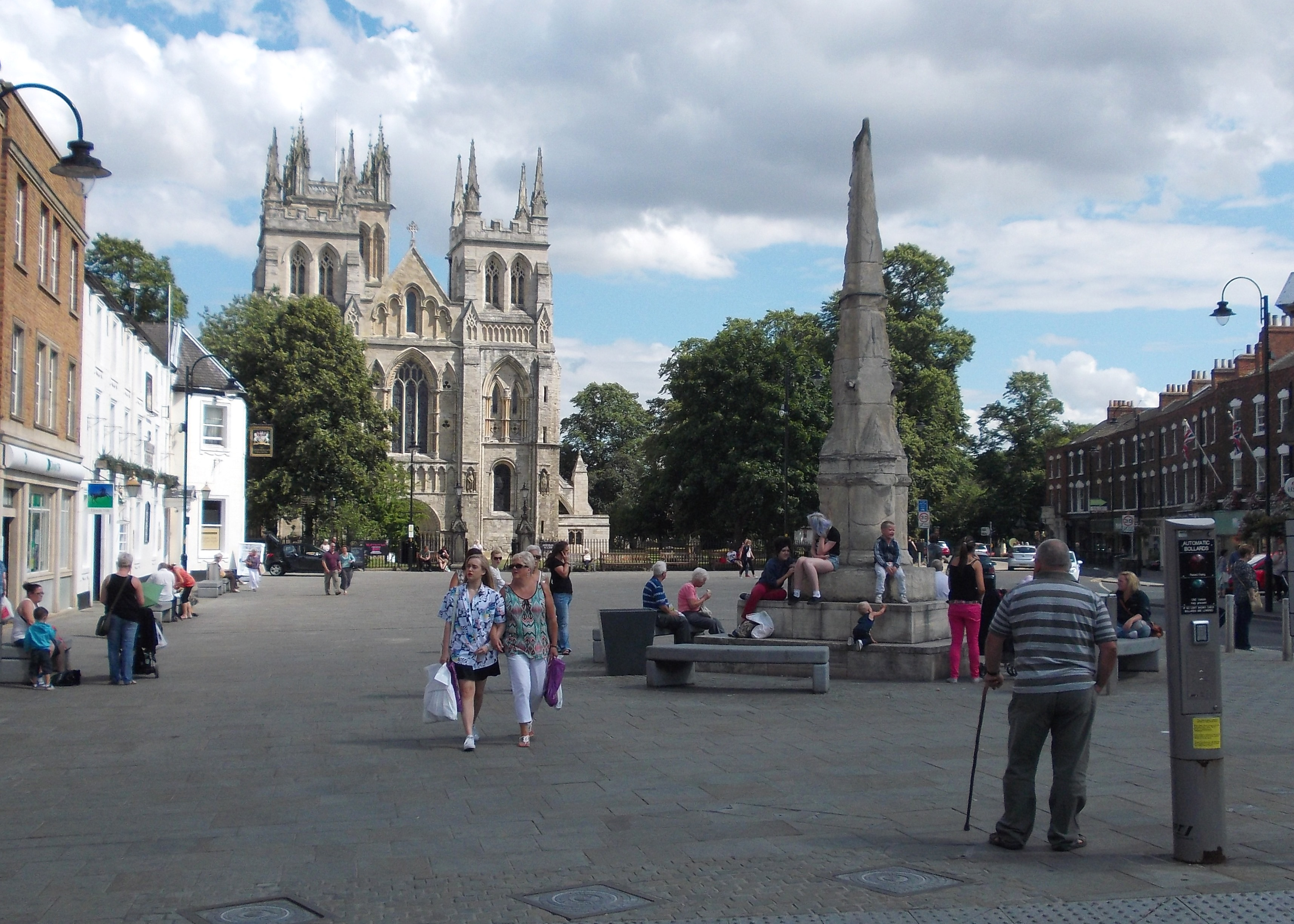
Selby market place with Selby Abbey in the background

Selby is a constituency in England, mostly in North Yorkshire and partly in West Yorkshire. Its largest settlement is the town of Selby, which has a population of around 20,000. Other settlements include the towns of Sherburn in Elmet and Kippax and the villages of Brayton, Barlby, Thorpe Willoughby, Allerton Bywater and Methley.

This is a large, rural constituency with many small villages and farms. This was traditionally a coal mining area, especially in the west around Kippax. Selby is a historic market town that was previously an important inland port with a significant shipbuilding industry. This constituency is predominantly wealthy; there is some deprivation in Selby town centre but Kippax, Sherburn in Elmet and Selby's suburbs are all affluent. Many residents commute to the nearby cities of Leeds and York. House prices across the constituency are generally lower than the UK average but higher than the rest of Yorkshire.

The Selby constituency has a low proportion of young adults and an above-average retired population. Residents have high levels of income and homeownership and the child poverty rate is low. They have average levels of education and a high proportion work in the manufacturing and construction sectors. The percentage claiming unemployment benefits is around half the UK-wide rate. White people made up 98% of the population at the 2021 census.

At the local council level, this constituency's towns are represented by the Labour Party whilst the rural areas elected Conservatives. An estimated 59% of voters in the Selby constituency supported leaving the European Union in the 2016 referendum, higher than the UK-wide figure of 52%.

== History ==
This was a safe Conservative seat from 1983 to 1997 then became a Labour marginal for the remainder of its first existence. It was a notional gain for Labour at the 2024 general election, on a swing of over 24%, slightly larger than the swing achieved in the by-election the previous year for its predecessor seat, Selby and Ainsty.

== Boundaries ==
=== 1983–2010 ===
1983–1997: The District of Selby, and the District of Ryedale ward of Osbaldwick and Heworth.

The constituency covered the district of Selby and the south-eastern suburbs of the city of York (namely the parishes of Fulford, Heslington and Osbaldwick and Heworth Without). It included the University of York and the Drax and Eggborough power stations.

1997–2010: The District of Selby.

=== 2007 Boundary Review ===
Following its review of parliamentary representation in York and North Yorkshire in the 2000s, the Boundary Commission for England created the new seat of Selby and Ainsty. This consisted of much of the former Selby constituency, minus the south-western suburbs of York which were included in the (also newly created) seat of York Outer, plus rural areas south and east of Harrogate formerly part of the abolished Vale of York constituency.

=== 2023 Boundary Review ===
The 2023 review of Westminster constituencies, which came into effect for the 2024 general election, recommended re-establishment of the constituency primarily from the abolished Selby and Ainsty constituency in North Yorkshire - excluding the Ainsty area and the North Yorkshire Council wards of Appleton Roebuck & Church Fenton and Tadcaster, and with the addition of the City of Leeds ward of Kippax and Methley in West Yorkshire.

=== Since 2024 ===
Under the 2023 review of Westminster constituencies, the seat was defined as being composed of the following as they existed on 1 December 2020:

- The City of Leeds ward of: Kippax & Methley;
- The District of Selby wards of: Barlby Village; Brayton; Byram & Brotherton; Camblesforth & Carlton; Cawood & Wistow; Derwent; Eggborough; Escrick; Hambleton; Monk Fryston; Riccall; Selby East; Selby West; Sherburn in Elmet; South Milford; Thorpe Willoughby; and Whitley.

However, before the new boundaries came into effect, the District of Selby was abolished and absorbed into the new unitary authority of North Yorkshire with effect from 1 April 2023. Consequently, the constituency now comprises the following from the 2024 general election:

- The City of Leeds ward of Kippax & Methley.
- The North Yorkshire electoral divisions of: Barlby & Riccall; Brayton & Barlow; Camblesforth & Carlton; Cawood & Escrick; Cliffe & North Duffield; Monk Fryston & South Milford; Osgoldcross; Selby East; Selby West; Sherburn in Elmet; Thorpe Willoughby & Hambleton.

== Members of Parliament ==
=== MPs 1983–2010 ===
Election	Member	Party
1983	Michael Alison	Conservative
1997	John Grogan	Labour
2010	constituency abolished: see Selby and Ainsty & York Outer	

=== MPs since 2024 ===
Selby and Ainsty prior to 2024

Election	Member	Party
2024	Keir Mather	Labour

== Elections ==
=== Elections in the 2020s ===
General election 2024: Selby
Party	Candidate	Votes	%	±%
Labour	Keir Mather	22,788	46.3	+16.5
Conservative	Charles Richardson	12,593	25.6	−32.4
Reform	David John Burns	9,565	19.4	N/A
Green	Angela Oldershaw	2,484	5.0	+2.0
Liberal Democrats	Christian Vassie	1,792	3.6	−2.4
Majority		10,195	20.7	N/A
Turnout		49,222	63.1	−7.5
Registered electors		78,055		
Labour gain from Conservative		Swing	+24.5	

- Keir Mather (Labour) ― Incumbent MP for Selby and Ainsty

=== Elections in the 2010s ===
2019 notional result
Party	Vote	%
Conservative	30,575	58.0
Labour	15,737	29.8
Liberal Democrats	3,165	6.0
Others	1,678	3.2
Green	1,602	3.0
Turnout	52,757	70.6
Electorate	74,761	

== Election results 1983–2010 ==
=== Elections in the 1980s ===
General election 1983: Selby
Party	Candidate	Votes	%	±%
Conservative	Michael Alison	26,712	56.7	
Liberal	Wilfred Whitaker	10,747	22.8	
Labour	Shirley Haines	9,687	20.6	
Majority		15,965	33.9	
Turnout		47,146	72.1	
Conservative win (new seat)				

General election 1987: Selby
Party	Candidate	Votes	%	±%
Conservative	Michael Alison	28,611	51.6	−5.1
Labour	John Grogan	14,832	26.7	+6.1
Liberal	James Longman	12,010	21.7	−1.1
Majority		13,779	24.9	−9.0
Turnout		55,453	77.69	+5.6
Conservative hold		Swing		

=== Elections in the 1990s ===
General election 1992: Selby
Party	Candidate	Votes	%	±%
Conservative	Michael Alison	31,067	50.2	−1.4
Labour	John Grogan	21,559	34.8	+8.1
Liberal Democrats	Edward Batty	9,244	14.9	−6.8
Majority		9,508	15.4	−9.5
Turnout		61,870	80.2	+2.5
Conservative hold		Swing	−4.7	

General election 1997: Selby
Party	Candidate	Votes	%	±%
Labour	John Grogan	25,838	45.9	+11.0
Conservative	Ken Hind	22,002	39.1	−11.1
Liberal Democrats	Edward Batty	6,778	12.0	−2.9
Referendum	David Walker	1,162	2.1	New
UKIP	P. Spence	536	1.0	New
Majority		3,836	6.8	N/A
Turnout		56,316	74.7	−5.5
Labour gain from Conservative		Swing	+11.1	

=== Elections in the 2000s ===
General election 2001: Selby
Party	Candidate	Votes	%	±%
Labour	John Grogan	22,652	45.1	−0.8
Conservative	Michael Mitchell	20,514	40.8	+1.7
Liberal Democrats	Jeremy Wilcock	5,569	11.1	−0.9
Green	Helen Kenwright	902	1.8	New
UKIP	Graham Lewis	635	1.3	+0.3
Majority		2,138	4.3	−2.5
Turnout		50,272	65.0	−9.7
Labour hold		Swing	−1.25	

General election 2005: Selby
Party	Candidate	Votes	%	±%
Labour	John Grogan	22,623	43.1	−2.0
Conservative	Mark Menzies	22,156	42.2	+1.4
Liberal Democrats	Ian Cuthbertson	7,770	14.8	+3.7
Majority		467	0.9	−3.4
Turnout		52,549	65.4	+0.4
Labour hold		Swing	−1.7	

== See also ==
- parliamentary constituencies in North Yorkshire
- List of parliamentary constituencies in the Yorkshire and the Humber (region)
