= Judy Armitage =

British biochemist and bacteriologist

- Born: Judith Patricia Armitage; 21 February 1951 (age 75); Shelley, West Riding of Yorkshire, England.
- Education: University College London
- Known for: The study of chemotactic mechanisms to control bacterial motion
- Spouse: John Jefferys
- Children: 2
- Scientific career
- Fields: Molecular and cellular biochemistry
- Workplaces: University of Oxford; University College London; Merton College, Oxford
- Thesis: Comparative biochemistry and physiology of the short and long forms of Proteus mirabilis (1976)

Judith Patricia Armitage FRS (born 1951) is a British molecular and cellular biochemist at the University of Oxford.

== Early life and education ==
Armitage was born on 21 February 1951 in Shelley, Yorkshire, England. She attended Selby Girls' High School, an all-girl grammar school, then located in the West Riding of Yorkshire. In her sixth form, the school became the co-educational Selby Grammar School.

Armitage earned a BSc in microbiology at University College London in 1972, and was awarded a PhD in 1976 for research on the bacterium Proteus mirabilis. She remained at UCL in the laboratory of Micheal Evans for her postdoctoral work.

== Research and career ==
Armitage's research is largely based on the motion of bacteria by flagellar rotation and the chemotactic mechanisms used to control that motion. Armitage was appointed Lecturer in Biochemistiry at Oxford in 1985 and was awarded the Title of Distinction of Professor of Biochemistry in 1996. Armitage is a fellow of Merton College, Oxford and has served as Director of the Oxford University Centre for Integrative Systems Biology since 2006.

Armitage was elected President of the Microbiology Society for 2019.

== Awards and honours ==
Armitage was awarded a Lister Institute Research Fellowship in 1982.

In 2010 Armitage was elected a member of the European Molecular Biology Organisation and in 2011 was elected a Fellow of the American Academy of Microbiology and a Fellow of the Royal Society of Biology.

Armitage was elected a Fellow of the Royal Society (FRS) in 2013. Her nomination reads:

Judith Armitage is distinguished for pioneering contributions to the understanding of spatio-temporal complexity and cellular organisation in bacteria. Combining biophysics and in vivo light microscopy with molecular genetics she discovered a new protein partitioning system that exerts spatial control over sensory signalling pathways. Co-crystal structural studies of a sensory kinase and its cognate response regulator directly revealed single amino acid changes involved in pathway discrimination. The first direct measurements of the dynamics of rotor and stator proteins in rotating flagellar motors revealed exchange with free protein pools, an observation which fundamentally changed our understanding of bacterial motility and behaviour.

In January 2019 she was elected president of the Microbiology Society for a term of three years.
