= Camblesforth =

Village and civil parish in North Yorkshire, England

Coordinates: 53°43′34″N 1°01′04″W

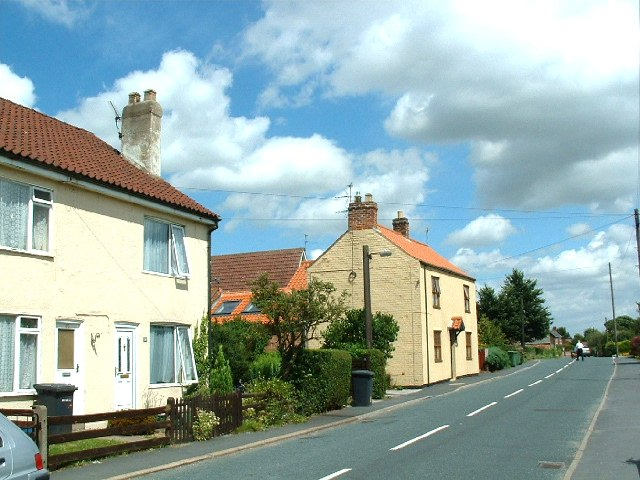
- Brigg Lane, Camblesforth

- Location within North Yorkshire
- Population: 1,568 (2011 census)
- OS grid reference: SE648264
  - London: 160 mi (260 km) S
- Civil parish: Camblesforth
- Unitary authority: North Yorkshire
- Ceremonial county: North Yorkshire
- Region: Yorkshire and the Humber
- Country: England
- Sovereign state: United Kingdom
- Post town: SELBY
- Postcode district: YO8
- Police: North Yorkshire
- Fire: North Yorkshire
- Ambulance: Yorkshire
- UK Parliament: Selby

Camblesforth is a village and civil parish in the county of North Yorkshire, England. According to the 2001 Census, the civil parish had a population of 1,526, increasing to 1,568 at the 2011 Census. The village is 5 miles (8 km) south of Selby and 7 miles (11 km) west of Goole.

It was historically part of the West Riding of Yorkshire until 1974. From 1974 to 2023 it was part of the Selby District; it is now administered by the unitary North Yorkshire Council.

It has a Methodist Chapel (1894) which is used for Parish Council and other meetings, and two public houses, the Comus Inn and the Black Dog.

== History ==
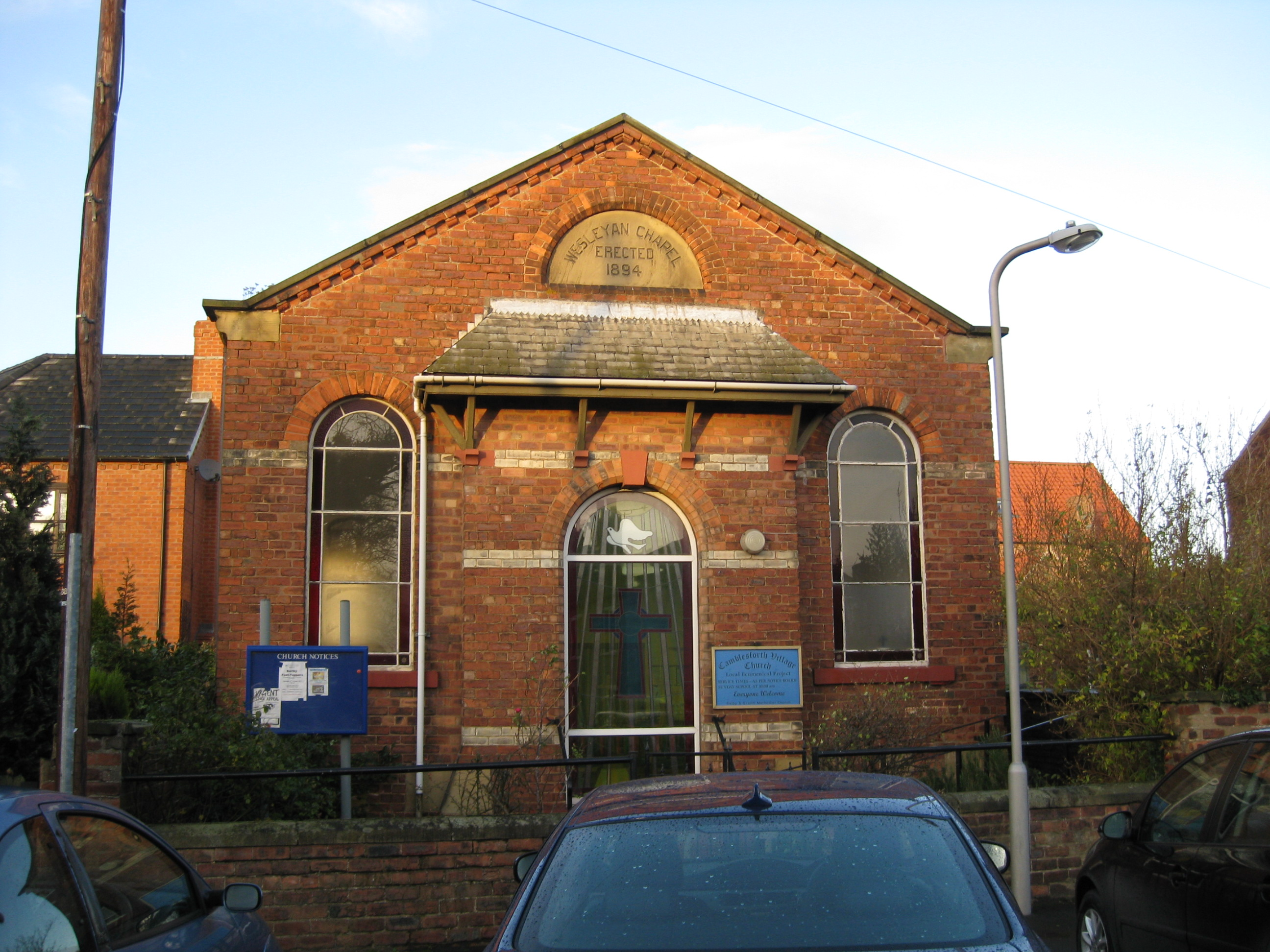
Camblesforth Chapel

The place-name 'Camblesforth' is first attested in the Domesday Book of 1086, where it appears as Camelesforde and Canbesford. The first element may be a river name corresponding to the Welsh camlais meaning 'crooked stream', so the name may mean 'ford on a crooked stream'.

Merleswein the Sheriff was Lord of the manor of Camblesforth in 1066. Ralph Paynell became Lord of the manor in 1086 after Camblesforth suffered the Harrowing of the North by William the Conqueror to subjugate Northern England.

In 1224, the Lordship passed through the Paynell family to the de Brus family. Subsequently, Sibil de Beaulieu (d.1301) daughter of Laderina de Brus, Lady of Camblesforth and granddaughter of Peter de Brus, Lord of Skelton married Sir Miles Stapleton (d.1314). The Lordship stayed in the Stapleton family until Henry Edwarde Paine acquired the Lordship from Henry Stapleton, 9th Lord Beaumont in 1893. The Lordship was in the hands of Mr. Paine's trustees from his death in 1917 to 1956 when it was acquired by Alma Grossman. Honorable F. Richard Gregg, OStJ, whose ancestors were related to the Brus and Stapleton family through marriage, became the 32nd Lord of Camblesforth when he acquired the Lordship from Ms. Grossman's trustees in 2015. He was granted a coat of arms sanctioned by Queen Elizabeth II in 2016 (College of Arms, vol.179, pg. 244). Richard served as an officer in the CAP and also received a Colonel commission from the Governor of KY in 2023. The current heir to the Lordship is his son, Honorable Benjamin R. Gregg.

Camblesforth Hall, the seat of Sir Charles Blois, Bart., is the oldest standing structure in Camblesforth. The Grade I hall was built c. 1690–1700.

The village was the centre of national public and media attention in July 2004, after the bodies of two 27-year-old twin sisters (Claire and Diane Sanderson) were found at a flat on Millfield Drive. It was the home of Claire Sanderson, who shared the flat with her fiancé Mark Hobson. On 18 April 2005, at Leeds Crown Court, Hobson admitted both of the murders as well as those of James and Joan Britton, a couple in their eighties who were found beaten to death in the village of Strensall near York. Hobson, a binman who had a history of violence, drug abuse and alcoholism, was sentenced to life imprisonment the following month with a recommendation that he should never be released.

During the 2012 Summer Olympics Camblesforth was a relay point for the Olympic Torch.

== Governance ==
An electoral ward with the same name exists. This ward stretches south to Carlton with a total population taken at the 2011 census of 4,317.

== See also ==
- Listed buildings in Camblesforth
