= Keir Mather =

British politician (born 1998)

Keir Mather MP
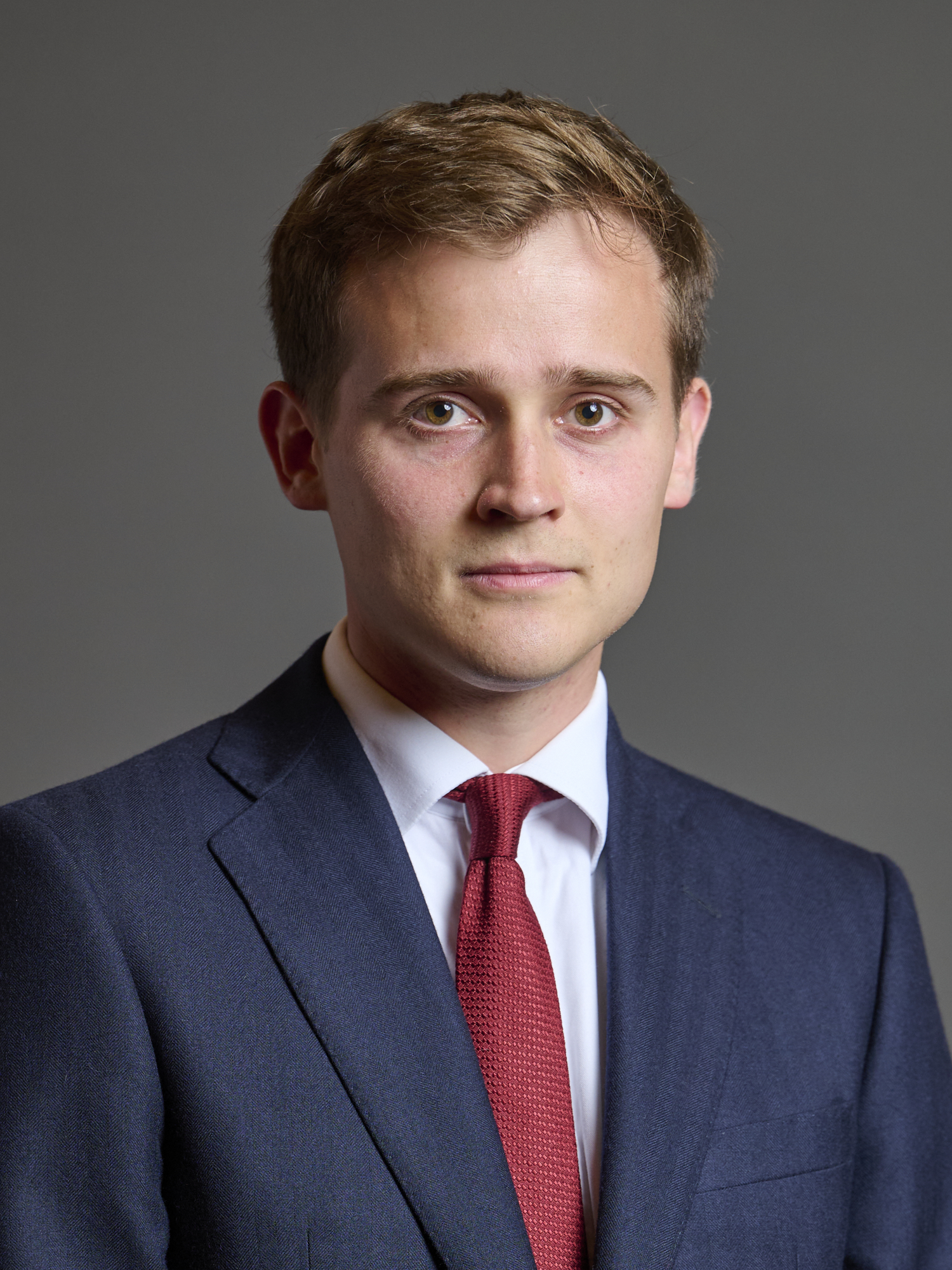
- Official portrait, 2024

Parliamentary Under-Secretary of State for Aviation, Maritime and Logistics
- Incumbent
- Assumed office 8 September 2025
- Prime Minister: Keir Starmer; Andy Burnham
- Preceded by: Mike Kane

Assistant Government Whip
- In office 10 July 2024 – 7 September 2025
- Prime Minister: Keir Starmer

Opposition Whip
- In office 26 March 2024 – 30 May 2024
- Leader: Keir Starmer

Member of Parliament for Selby Selby and Ainsty (2023–2024)
- Incumbent
- Assumed office 20 July 2023
- Preceded by: Nigel Adams
- Majority: 10,195 (20.7%)

Personal details
- Born: Keir Alexander Mather; 29 January 1998 (age 28) Kingston upon Hull, England
- Party: Labour
- Education: Wadham College, Oxford (BA); University College, Oxford (MPP)
- Website: www.keirmather.org

Keir Alexander Mather (/kɪər ˈmeɪðər/; born 29 January 1998) is a British Labour politician who has been Member of Parliament (MP) for Selby, formerly Selby and Ainsty, since 2023. He has served as a Parliamentary Under-Secretary of State for Transport since September 2025, making him the youngest minister since William Ewart Gladstone in 1834.

== Early life and education ==
Keir Mather was born in 1998 in Kingston upon Hull. He was named after Keir Hardie, the founder of the Labour Party. Mather grew up in Brough. His mother, Jill Tambaros (née Golding), is a supply teacher, and his father, Mick Mather, is a support worker. His father is also a Labour Party activist. Mather was a member of the Youth Parliament, and set up a Labour group for young people in Hull. He was educated "for a short time" at a private prep school, and then at state schools including South Hunsley School in Melton. His mother recalled, in 2023, that Mather was interested in politics as a schoolboy: "When he was 16, I was dropping him off at the office of every MP in Hull, ... He said 'I'm going to introduce myself to them'. I thought it was funny he was so determined to go and see all those MPs".

He then went to the University of Oxford, graduating with a first in History and Politics at Wadham College, before receiving a Master of Public Policy (MPP) degree at University College. According to Paul Martin, Mather's politics tutor at Oxford, Mather was specifically interested in New Labour and "had a lifelong interest" in its major figures. Intent on becoming an MP, Mather studied for the MPP at Oxford's Blavatnik School of Government as a Political Leadership Scholar in a scheme that was "open to applicants from the UK and Republic of Ireland who intend to run for public office". While a student at Oxford, he was an appointed official of the Oxford Union debating society as head of research, and was also a co-chair of the Oxford University Labour Club.

== Early career ==
Whilst at Oxford University, Mather worked as a researcher for The Times journalist and former Conservative MP Matthew Parris.

Mather then worked as a public affairs adviser for the Confederation of British Industry for 18 months before entering Parliament and was a parliamentary researcher for Labour MP Wes Streeting from 2019 to 2020.

== Parliamentary career ==
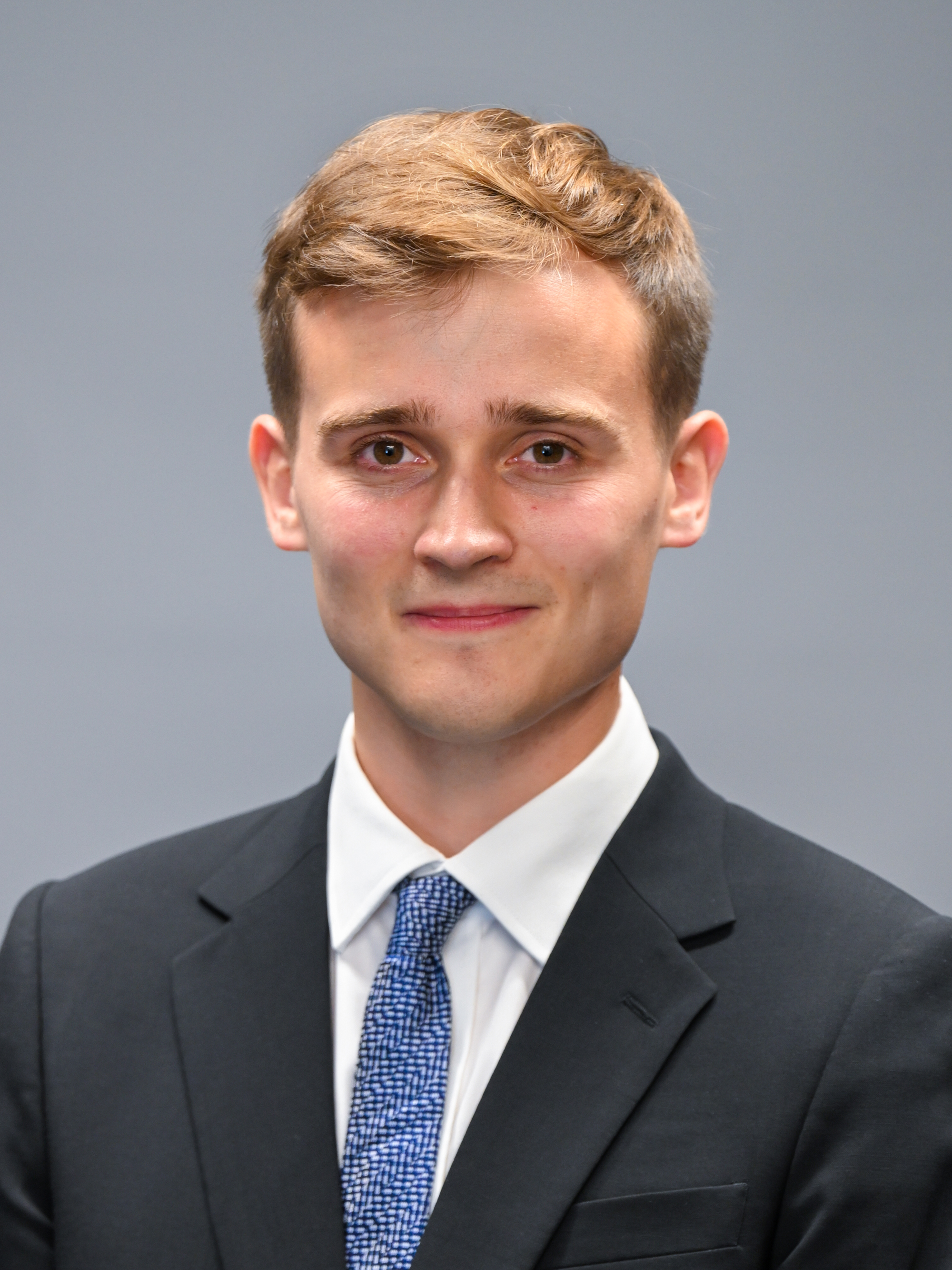
Official portrait, 2023

Mather was first elected to the House of Commons as MP for Selby and Ainsty at the 2023 Selby and Ainsty by-election with a 46% share of the vote and a majority of 4,161 votes. The previous Conservative majority of 20,137 votes, secured by the resigning MP Nigel Adams in the 2019 general election, was the largest ever overturned by Labour in a by-election. It also represented the biggest swing for a Labour by-election candidate since the 1994 Dudley West by-election.

Aged 25 when elected, Mather became the youngest serving MP, known as the Baby of the House, succeeding Labour MP Nadia Whittome of Nottingham East, who is two years his senior; she was first elected in the 2019 general election at the age of 23. Upon his election, the Veterans' Affairs Minister Johnny Mercer said that parliament "mustn't become a repeat of The Inbetweeners". This was considered to be a derogatory remark towards Mather's age, which Mercer denied. Multiple Labour politicians, including party leader Sir Keir Starmer, criticised Mercer's comment. The Guardian noted that former UK Prime Ministers William Ewart Gladstone and Winston Churchill first became MPs at the ages of 22 and 25 respectively. Mather ceased to be the youngest MP when Sam Carling (born 2002) was elected in 2024.

Mather was sworn in as an MP on 4 September 2023, following the summer break, along with Sarah Dyke and Steve Tuckwell. Dyke, a Liberal Democrat, was elected for Somerton and Frome, and Tuckwell, from the Conservative Party, was elected for Uxbridge and South Ruislip in two by-elections held the same day as Mather's. In interviews with BBC News and The Press from the same month, Mather said his main priority as an MP was to support people affected by the cost of living crisis. Other priorities included addressing insufficient SEND provision, rural crime, anti-social behaviour, underpeforming NHS services, little public transport provision and supporting small businesses. Mather made his maiden speech on 16 October 2023, during a debate on Early Years Childcare.

Mather became a member of the Treasury Select Committee on 20 November 2023. On 26 March 2024, he was appointed to the opposition frontbench of Keir Starmer as an opposition whip.

Due to the 2023 review of Westminster constituencies, Mather's constituency of Selby and Ainsty was abolished, and replaced with Selby. At the 2024 general election, Mather was elected to Parliament as MP for Selby with 46.3% of the vote and a majority of 10,195.

He was appointed a Parliamentary Under-Secretary of State for Transport on 7 September 2025, making him the youngest minister since William Ewart Gladstone in 1834.

== Political views ==
Mather voted for Remain in the Brexit referendum. He does not support rejoining the European Union or holding a second referendum on the issue.

In 2023, Mather said he supported Labour leader Keir Starmer's policy of maintaining the two-child benefit cap, adding: "I think we're going to inherit an absolute economic mess from the Conservatives when we take power and we're going to have to make extremely difficult decisions once we do, and I support the Labour government in doing so."

On gender identity, Mather has said "a woman is like my mum or my stepsister, somebody who is born biologically a woman. But there is a very small minority of people who feel like they've been born into the wrong gender and they deserve respect and care." In 2018, during a debate at the Oxford Union, Mather allegedly called Germaine Greer "an abhorrent transphobe" for stating that transgender women were not women. He also said Greer had made "dehumanising and downright dangerous comments about transgender women". When asked if he wanted to renounce his statements about Greer as an MP in 2023, Mather said: "What I said is on the record. I really strongly disagree with her outlook and approach to the issue."

He is a member of the Fabian Society.

== Personal life ==
Mather is gay. He supports the rugby league club Hull Kingston Rovers.

Parliament of the United Kingdom
Preceded by Nigel Adams	Member of Parliament for Selby and Ainsty; 2023–2024	Constituency abolished
New constituency	Member of Parliament for Selby; 2024–present	Incumbent
Honorary titles
Preceded by Nadia Whittome	Baby of the House; 2023–2024	Succeeded by Sam Carling
