= Selby and Ainsty =

UK Parliament constituency (2010–2024)

- Former county constituency for the House of Commons
- 2010–2024 boundary of Selby and Ainsty in North Yorkshire

- Location of North Yorkshire within England
- County: North Yorkshire
- Electorate: 77,654 (December 2019)
- Major settlements: Selby, Tadcaster, Sherburn in Elmet

2010–2024
- Seats: One
- Created from: Selby
- Replaced by: Selby; Wetherby and Easingwold (part)

Selby and Ainsty was a constituency (Note: A county constituency (for the purposes of election expenses and type of returning officer)) in North Yorkshire.

Further to the completion of the 2023 Periodic Review of Westminster constituencies, the seat was subject to boundary changes involving the loss of the Ainsty area. As a consequence, it reverted to the name of Selby, which was first contested at the 2024 general election.

== History ==
For 2010, the Boundary Commission recommended the creation of this seat following a review of parliamentary representation in York and North Yorkshire. The constituency was formed from the former Selby constituency, except for some villages near York that were moved to the new York Outer constituency and rural areas south and east of Harrogate previously in the Vale of York constituency.

Until 2023, the seat had been won by the Conservative Party by a successively larger set of majorities each time it has been contested, though the 2017 general election had the unusual result of the Conservatives slightly increasing their majority despite a slight swing towards the Labour Party, mostly due to a significantly higher turnout.

On 12 June 2023 the seat became vacant following the formal resignation of the incumbent, Nigel Adams, and the resulting by-election returned Labour's Keir Mather.

Before 2024 general election, Boundary Commission's 2023 Periodic Review of Westminster constituencies abolished the constituency. It was succeeded by newly reformed Selby constituency with similar boundaries.

== Boundaries ==
The constituency consists of:

- The entire former District of Selby
- The electoral wards of Marston Moor, Ouseburn, Ribston, and Spofforth with Lower Wharfedale in the former Borough of Harrogate

== Constituency profile ==
Map of boundaries 2010–2024

The constituency was mainly rural. The only towns were Selby, Tadcaster, and Sherburn in Elmet. The rural areas included parts of the ancient Wapentake of the Ainsty of York.

In statistics

The constituency consisted of Census Output Areas of two local government districts with similar characteristics: a working population whose income is close to the national average and lower than average reliance upon social housing. At the end of 2012, 2.2% of the population were claiming jobseekers' allowance, compared with the regional average of 4.7%. The district contributing to the bulk of the seat has a low 14.5% of its population without a car, 21.2% of the population without qualifications, and a relatively high 26.1% with level 4 qualifications or above. 75.0% of homes were owned outright or on a mortgage by occupants as of the 2011 census across the Selby district.

== Members of Parliament ==
=== MPs 2010–2024 ===
Selby prior to 2010

Election	Member	Party
2010	Nigel Adams	Conservative
2023 by-election	Keir Mather	Labour
2024	Constituency abolished	

== Election results 2010–2024 ==
=== Elections in the 2010s ===
General election 2010: Selby and Ainsty
Party	Candidate	Votes	%	±%
Conservative	Nigel Adams	25,562	49.4	
Labour	Jan Marshall	13,297	25.7	
Liberal Democrats	Tom Holvey	9,180	17.7	
UKIP	Darren Haley	1,635	3.2	
BNP	Duncan Lorriman	1,377	2.7	
English Democrat	Graham Glynn	677	1.3	
Majority		12,265	23.7	N/A
Turnout		51,728	71.1	N/A
Conservative win (new seat)				

General election 2015: Selby and Ainsty
Party	Candidate	Votes	%	±%
Conservative	Nigel Adams	27,725	52.5	+3.1
Labour	Mark Hayes	14,168	26.8	+1.1
UKIP	Colin Heath	7,389	14.0	+10.8
Liberal Democrats	Nicola Turner	1,920	3.6	−14.1
Green	Ian Richards	1,465	2.8	New
TUSC	Ian Wilson	137	0.3	New
Majority		13,557	25.7	+2.0
Turnout		52,804	69.4	−1.7
Conservative hold		Swing	+1.0	

General election 2017: Selby and Ainsty
Party	Candidate	Votes	%	±%
Conservative	Nigel Adams	32,921	58.7	+6.2
Labour	David Bowgett	19,149	34.1	+7.3
Liberal Democrats	Callum Delhoy	2,293	4.1	+0.5
UKIP	Tony Pycroft	1,713	3.1	−10.9
Majority		13,772	24.6	−1.1
Turnout		56,222	74.1	+4.7
Conservative hold		Swing	-0.5	

General election 2019: Selby and Ainsty
Party	Candidate	Votes	%	±%
Conservative	Nigel Adams	33,995	60.3	+1.6
Labour	Malik Rofidi	13,858	24.6	−9.5
Liberal Democrats	Katharine Macy	4,842	8.6	+4.5
Yorkshire	Mike Jordan	1,900	3.4	New
Green	Arnold Warneken	1,823	3.2	New
Majority		20,137	35.7	+10.1
Turnout		56,418	71.7	−2.4
Conservative hold		Swing	+5.5	

=== Elections in the 2020s ===
By-election 2023: Selby and Ainsty
Party	Candidate	Votes	%	±%
Labour	Keir Mather	16,456	46.0	+21.4
Conservative	Claire Holmes	12,295	34.3	−26.0
Green	Arnold Warneken	1,838	5.1	+1.9
(Note: This candidate left the optional Description field blank on their registration form, but is standing for the Yorkshire Party)	Mike Jordan	1,503	4.2	+0.8
Reform	Dave Kent	1,332	3.7	New
Liberal Democrats	Matt Walker	1,188	3.3	−5.3
Independent	Nick Palmer	342	1.0	New
SDP	John Waterstone	314	0.9	New
Monster Raving Loony	Sir Archibald Stanton	172	0.5	New
Heritage	Guy Phoenix	162	0.5	New
(Note: This independent candidate left the optional Description field blank on their registration form)	Andrew Gray	99	0.3	New
Independent	Tyler Wilson-Kerr	67	0.2	New
Climate	Luke Wellock	39	0.1	New
Majority		4,161	11.7	N/A
Turnout		35,807	44.8	−26.9
Labour gain from Conservative		Swing	+23.7	

== See also ==
- List of parliamentary constituencies in North Yorkshire
