= Thorpe Willoughby =

Village and civil parish in North Yorkshire, England

Coordinates: 53.77193°N 1.12561°W

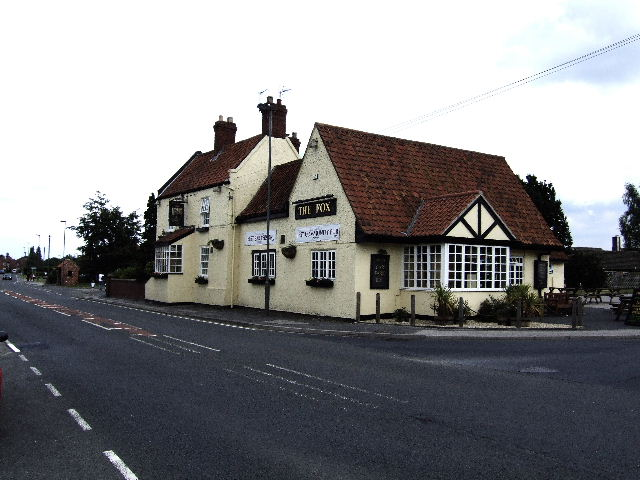
- The Fox, Thorpe Willoughby

- Location within North Yorkshire
- Population: 2,725 (2011 census)
- OS grid reference: SE577309
  - London: 160 mi (260 km) SSE
- Unitary authority: North Yorkshire
- Ceremonial county: North Yorkshire
- Region: Yorkshire and the Humber
- Country: England
- Sovereign state: United Kingdom
- Post town: SELBY
- Postcode district: YO8
- Police: North Yorkshire
- Fire: North Yorkshire
- Ambulance: Yorkshire

Thorpe Willoughby is a village and civil parish in the county of North Yorkshire, England. The village is situated just off the A1238 (a primary road, previously designated A63 prior to the construction of the Selby Bypass) and is in close proximity to Selby.

The village was historically part of the West Riding of Yorkshire until 1974. From 1974 to 2023 it was part of the Selby District, it is now administered by the unitary North Yorkshire Council.

== History and overview ==
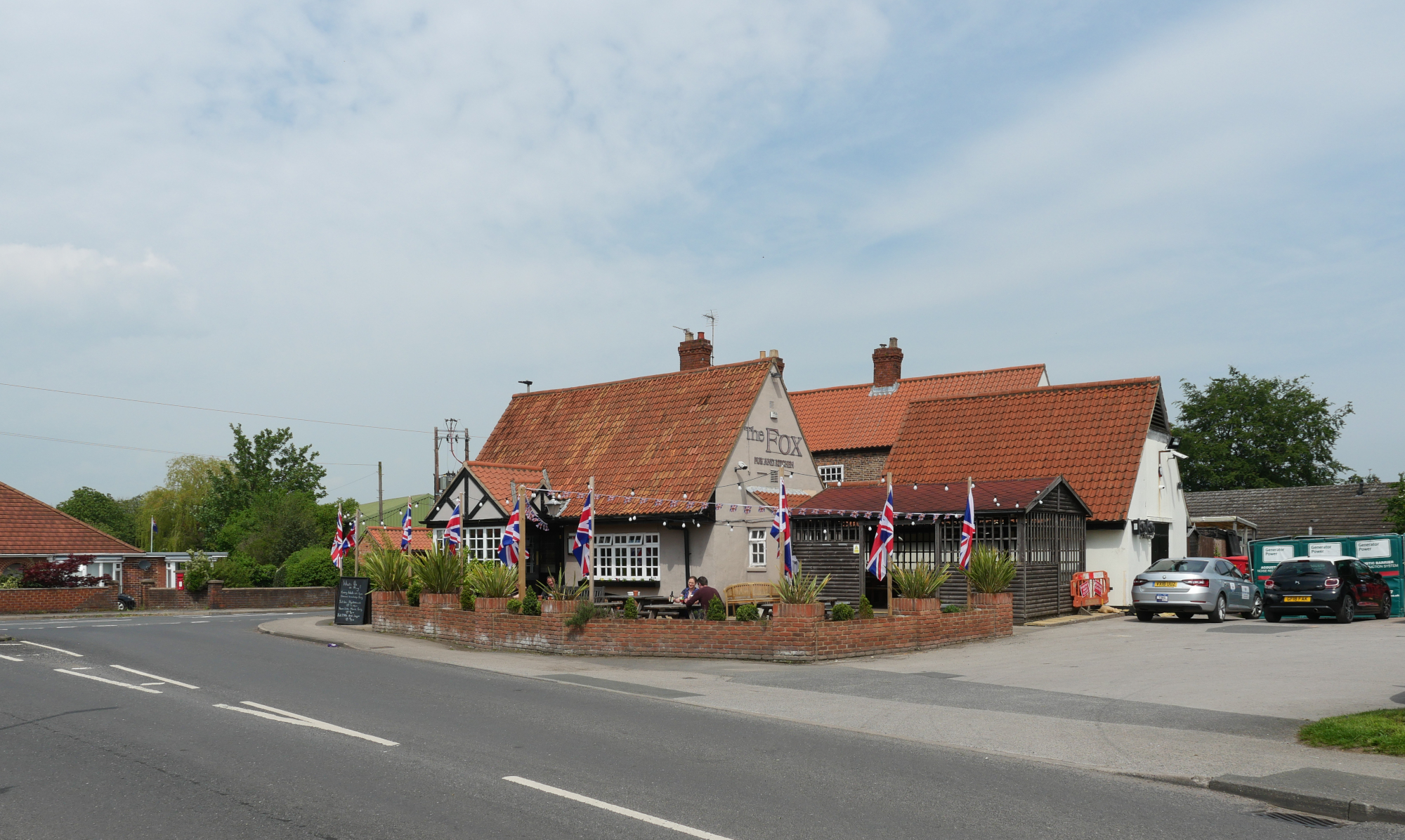
The Fox

Thorpe Willoughby has a village public house called "The Fox", a set of local shops with a fish and chip shop, a primary school, a village green and village hall, and a sports field with associated bar. The United Kingdom Census 2001 states the population of Thorpe Willoughby to be 2,822, falling to 2,725 at the 2011 Census.

Scand. Thorp, "an outlying farmstead or hamlet", "a dependent secondary settlement". 1086 Torp, 1276 Thorp Wyleby.

The manorial affix originates from the Willeby family who were resident here in the 13th century. In the Brayton parish register of the 18th century it is referred to as Thorp.

Like Hambleton, Thorpe Willoughby has a hill to the south of the village, Brayton Barff. These two prominences appear to be the only high ground in the Vale of York, which is at its widest here, until the land rises towards Hillam and Monk Fryston in the West. Both prominences may represent the remains of "crag and tail" structures from the Wurm glacial episode 10,000 years ago, the Escrick moraine lying further north at York.

== See also ==
- Listed buildings in Thorpe Willoughby
