= List of places in Yorkshire =

This is a list of cities, towns, villages and hamlets in the counties of the East Riding of Yorkshire, North Yorkshire, South Yorkshire and West Yorkshire.

== A ==
- Aberford, Acaster Malbis, Acaster Selby, Acklam (Middlesbrough), Acklam (Ryedale), Ackworth, Acomb, Ackton, Addingham, Adel, Adlingfleet, Adwick le Street, Adwick upon Dearne, Agbrigg, Agglethorpe, Aike, Ainderby Quernhow, Ainderby Steeple, Ainthorpe, Aire View, Airmyn, Airton, Aiskew, Aislaby (Ryedale), Aislaby (Scarborough), Aismunderby, Akebar, Aldborough, Aldbrough, Aldbrough St John, Aldfield, Aldro, Aldwark, Allerston, Allerthorpe, Allerton, Allerton Bywater, Allerton Mauleverer, Almondbury, Alne, Altofts, Alverley, Alverthorpe, Amotherby, Ampleforth, Angram (Long Marston), Angram (Muker), Anlaby, Anlaby Common, Anston, Appersett, Applegarth, Appleton Roebuck, Appleton Wiske, Appleton-le-Moors, Appleton-le-Street, Appletreewick, Arbourthorne, Ardsley, Arkendale, Arkle Town, Arksey, Armthorpe, Arncliffe, Arnold, Arram, Arrathorne, Arrunden, Arthington, Asenby, Aske, Askern, Askham Bryan, Askham Richard, Askrigg, Askwith, Asselby, Aston, Athersley, Atley Hill, Atwick, Auckley, Aughton (East Riding of Yorkshire), Aughton (South Yorkshire), Austonley, Austwick, Aysgarth, Azerley

== B ==
- Bagby, Baildon, Bainbridge, Bainton, Balby, Baldersby St James, Balkholme, Balne, Bardsey, Barkerend, Barkisland, Barkston Ash, Barlby, Barmby Moor, Barmby on the Marsh, Barmston, Barnburgh, Barnby Dun, Barnsley, Barthorpe, Barton Hill, Barton-le-Willows, Barugh, Barugh-Green, Barwick-in-Elmet, Batley, Battersby, Battyeford, Bawtry, Beadlam, Beal, Beamsley, Beck Hole, Bedale, Beeford, Beggarington, Beggarington Hill, Beighton, Belby, Bell Busk, Bellasize, Bempton, Beningbrough, Bennetland, Benningholme, Bentley, Berry Brow, Bessacarr, Bessingby, Beswick, Beverley, Bewholme, Bickerton, Bielby, Bilbrough, Billingley, Bilton (East Riding of Yorkshire), Bilton (Harrogate), Bilton-in-Ainsty, Bingley, Binsoe, Birdsedge, Birdwell, Birkby, Birkdale, Birkenshaw, Birstall, Birstwith, Bishop Burton, Bishopdale, Bishop Wilton, Blacker Hill, Blackmoorfoot, Blacktoft, Blaxton, Blubberhouses, Bolsterstone, Boltby, Bolton, Bolton on Dearne, Booth Bank, Boothferry, Boothtown, Booze, Boroughbridge, Borrowby (Hambleton), Borrowby (Scarborough), Bossall, Boston Spa, Bottom Boat, Boulderclough, Bouthwaite, Boynton, Bracken on the Wolds, Bradfield Dale, Bradford, Bradley, Bradshow, Bradway, Braithwood, Braithwell, Bramham, Bramham cum Oglethorpe, Bramhope, Bramley, Leeds, Bramley, South Yorkshire, Brampton, Brampton-en-le-Morthen, Brandesburton, Brantingham, Branton, Braythorn, Brayton, Breighton, Bretton, Bridge Hewick, Bridlington, Brierley, Brigham, Brighouse, Brightholmlee, Brind, Brinsworth, Broadgate, Brockfield, Brockholes, Brodsworth, Brokes, Bromley, Brompton-by-Sawdon, Brookhouse, Broomfleet, Brotherton, Brough, Broughton (near Malton), Broughton (near Skipton), Bruxton, Bubwith, Buckden, Buckton, Bubwith, Bugthorpe, Bulmer, Burdale, Burghwallis, Burley, Burley-in-Wharfedale, Burley Woodhead, Burnby, Burneston, Burniston, Burnlee, Burnsall, Burnt Yates, Bursea, Burshill, Burstwick, Burton Agnes, Burton Constable, Burton Fleming, Burton Leonard, Burton Pidsea, Burton Salmon, Burythorpe, Buttercrambe, Byland Abbey

== C ==
- Calcutt, Calder Grove, Caldwell, Calverley, Camblesforth, Camerton, Campsall, Canklow, Carcroft, Carlecotes, Carleton, Carlton in Cleveland, Carlton (Richmondshire), Carlton (Selby), Carlton Husthwaite, Carlton Miniott, Carnaby, Carperby, Carr, Carr Gate, Cartworth, Castle Bolton, Castleford, Castleton, Catcliffe, Catfoss, Catshaw, Cattal, Catterick, Catwick, Cawthorne, Cawood, Chapel Hill, Cherry Burton, Chop Gate, Church End, Churwell, Church Fenton, Church Houses, Clap Gate, Clareton, Clayton (South Yorkshire), Clayton (West Yorkshire), Clayton West, Cleasby, Cleckheaton, Clifford, Clifton (Doncaster), Clifton (Rotherham), Clifton (West Yorkshire), Clifton (York), Clotherholme, Cloughton, Cloughton Newlands, Cold Kirby, Collingham, Colton (Leeds), Colton (North Yorkshire), Commondale, Coneysthorpe, Conisbrough Coniston, Conistone, Cononley, Constable Burton, Copley, Copt Hewick, Cotness, Cottam, Cotterdale, Cottingham, Countersett, Cowden, Cowesby, Cowlam, Cowling (Craven), Cowling (Hambleton), Cowthorpe, Coxwold, Crackpot, Crambe, Crambeck Village, Crane Moor, Cranswick, Crathorne, Cray, Crayke, Crigglestone, Crofton, Croft-on-Tees, Croome, Cropton, Crossflatts, Cross Hills, Crosspool, Crowdon, Cubeck, Cubley, Cudworth, Cundy Cross

== D ==
- Dalby, Dallowgill, Dalton (South Yorkshire), Dalton (West Yorkshire), Dalton Gates, Dalton Magna, Dalton-on-Tees, Damems, Danby, Danby Wiske, Danthorpe, Darfield, Darnall, Darrington, Darton, Deepcar, Denaby, Denaby Main, Denby Dale, Denholme, Denton, Dewsbury, Dinnington, Dodworth, Doncaster, Dore, Drewton, Driffield, Drighlington, Dringhoe, Drub, Duggleby, Dunkeswick, Dunnington, Dunford Bridge, Dungworth, Dunswell, Durkar

== E ==
- Earby, Earswick, Easington (East Riding of Yorkshire), Easington (North Yorkshire), Easingwold, East Ardsley [Near Wakefield], East Barnby, East Cottingwith, East Cowick, East Hardwick, East Heslerton, East Knapton, East Newton, Eastburn, East Layton, East Lutton, Eastrington, East Rigton, Ebberston, Eccleshill, Eddlethorpe, Edenthorpe, Edlington, Egton, Egton Bridge, Elland, Ellerker, Ellerton (East Riding), Ellerton (near Catterick, North Yorkshire), Ellerton (in Swaledale, North Yorkshire), Elloughton, Elmswell, Elsecar, Elstronwick, Embsay, Emley, Emmotland, Entercommon, Eppleby, Eppleworth, Eryholme, Eske, Eston, Etherdwick, Etton, Everingham, Everley, Everthorpe, Ewden

== F ==
- Fadmoor, Fangdale Beck, Fangfoss, Farnhill, Farnley (North Yorkshire), Farnley (West Yorkshire), Farsley, Faxfleet, Featherstone, Felixkirk, Fenay Bridge, Fenwick, Ferrybridge, Fewston, Filey, Fimber, Finghall, Finkle Street, Finningley, Firbeck, Firby (near Bedale), Firby (Westow), Fishlake, Fitling, Flamborough, Flaxby, Flaxton, Flaxton Moor, Flinton, Flockton, Flockton Green, Flockton Moor, Foggathorpe, Follifoot, Forcett, Fordon, Fossdale, Fosterhouses, Foston, Foston on the Wolds, Foulby, Fountainhead Village, Foxholes, Fox Royd, Fraisthorpe, Fremington, Frickley, Fridaythorpe, Full Sutton, Fulneck, Fulstone, Fulwood, Fylingdales, Fylingthorpe

== G ==
- Ganstead, Gardham, Garforth, Gargrave, Garrowby, Garton, Garton on the Wolds, Gate Helmsley, Gawber, Gawthorpe (Kirklees), Gawthorpe (Wakefield), Gayle, Gembling, Giggleswick, Gilberdyke, Gildersome, Gildingwells, Gilling East, Gilling West, Gilroyd, Girsby, Givendale, Glaisdale, Glasshouses, Glusburn, Goathland, Golcar, Goldsborough (Harrogate), Goldsborough (Lythe, near Whitby), Goldthorpe, Gomersal, Goodmanham, Goole, Gowdall, Gowthorpe, Goxhill, Grangetown, Gransmoor, Grassington, Greasbrough, Great Ayton, Great Cowden, Great Givendale, Great Hammerton, Great Hatfield, Great Heck, Great Houghton, Great Kelk, Great Ouseburn, Great Preston, Green Hammerton, Greenhill, Greenhow Hill, Greetland, Grenoside, Grewelthorpe, Gribthorpe, Grimethorpe, Grimston, Grindale, Grinton, Grosmont, Guisborough, Guiseley, Gunby, Gunnerside Gunthwaite

== H ==
- Hackenthorpe, Hackness, Hade Edge, Hainworth, Haisthorpe, Halifax, Hall Green, Halsham, Hambleton (Craven), Hambleton (Selby), Hampole, Harden, Hardraw, Harecroft, Harehills, Harehills Corner, Harewood, Harley, Harlington, Harlthorpe, Harmby, Harpham, Harrogate, Harswell, Hartforth, Harthill, Harton, Hartshead, Harwood Dale, Hasholme, Hatfield, Hawes, Haworth, Hawnby, Haxby, Hayton, Hazlehead, Hazlewood, Healaugh (Selby), Healaugh (Richmondshire) Hebden, Hebden Bridge, Heckmondwike, Hedon, Hellaby, Hellifield, Helme, Helmsley, Helwith, Hemingbrough, Hempholme, Hemsworth, Henderskelfe, Hensall, Heptonstall, Hepworth, Hermit Hill, Herringthorpe, Hesley, Heslington, Hessay, Hessle, Hetton, Heworth, Hexthorpe, Hickleton, Highfield, Highfields, Highgate, High Birkwith, High Bradfield, High Catton, High Eggborough, High Flatts, High Gardham, High Green (Kirklees), High Green (Sheffield), High Hoyland, High Hunsley, High Normanby, High Shaw, High Worsall, Higham, Hightown, Hilston, Hipperholme, Hive, Hollinthorpe, Hollow Meadows, Hollym, Holmbridge, Holme, Holme on the Wolds, Holme-on-Spalding-Moor, Holmfield, Holmfirth, Holmpton, Holtby, Holywell Green, Honeywell, Honley, Hoober, Hood Green, Hook, Hoo Hole, Hooton Pagnell, Hooton Roberts, Horbury, Hornby, Hornsea, Horsforth, Hotham, Houghton, Houses Hill, Hovingham, Howbrook, Howden, Howdendyke, Howsham, Hoyland, Hoylandswaine, Hoyland Common, Hubberholme, Huby, Huddersfield, Huggate, Hull, Hull Bridge, Humbleton, Hunmanby, Hunsingore, Hunslet, Huntington, Hunton, Husthwaite, Hutton Buscel, Hutton Cranswick, Hutton Rudby, Huttons Ambo,

== I ==
- Idle, Ilkley, Ilton, Ingbirchworth, Ingleby Arncliffe, Ingleby Barwick, Ingleby Cross, Ingleton, Ingmanthorpe, Ingrow, Intake, Irton, Ivelet

== J ==
- Jackson Bridge, Jagger Green, Jaw Hill, Jump

== K ==
- Kearby, Kearton, Keighley, Keld, Kelfield, Kelleythorpe, Kendray, Kennythorpe, Kepwick, Kettleness, Kettlewell, Kexbrough, Kexby, Keyingham, Kiddal Lane End, Kidstones, Kildwick, Kilham, Kilnhurst, Kilnsea, Kilnsey, Kilnwick, Kilnwick Percy, Kilpin, Kilpin Pike, Kimberworth, Kimberworth Park, Kingstone, Kingston upon Hull, Kinsley, Kiplingcotes, Kippax, Kirk Bramwith, Kirby Grindalythe, Kirby Misperton, Kirby Underdale, Kirk Deighton, Kirk Ella, Kirkburn, Kirkburton, Kirkbymoorside, Kirkby Wharfe, Kirkham, Kirkhamgate, Kirk Hammerton, Kirk Sandall, Kirk Smeaton, Kirkheaton, Kirkhouse Green, Kirkleatham, Kirklington, Kirkthorpe, Kiveton Park, Knapton, Knaresborough, Knedlington, Knottingley, Krumlin

== L ==
- Laisterdyke, Land of Nod, Lane, Lane Head, Langdale End, Langsett, Langtoft, Langton, Laskill, Laughton Common, Laughton-en-le-Morthen, Laverton, Laxton, Laytham, Lealholm, Leathley, Leavening, Leconfield, Ledsham, Ledston, Leeds, Lelley, Leppington, Lepton, Letwell, Leven, Levisham, Levitt Hagg, Leyburn, Lindley (North Yorkshire), Lindley (Huddersfield), Lindholme, Lindrick Dale, Linfit, Lingards Wood, Linton (North Yorkshire), Linton (West Yorkshire), Linthwaite, Lightcliffe, Lilling Green, Linthorpe, Linthwaite, Lissett, Little Catwick, Little Driffield, Little Fenton, Little Hatfield, Little Houghton, Little Kelk, Little London, Little Ouseburn, Little Preston, Little Reedness, Little Ribston, Little Skipwith, Littletown, Little Weighton, Liversedge, Lockington, Lockton, Lodge, Lofthouse (North Yorkshire), Lofthouse (West Yorkshire), Loftus, Londesborough, Londonderry, Low Bradfield, Long Riston, Long Preston, Lothersdale, Loversall, Low Ackworth, Low Catton, Lowedges, Lower Mickletown, Low Row, Lowthorpe, Low Worsall, Lucy Cross, Luddenden, Lund, Lunds, Lundwood

== M ==
- Malham, Maltby, Maltkiln, Malton, Manfield, Manningham, Manvers, Mappleton, Mapplewell, Market Weighton, Marr, Marsden, Marske-by-the-Sea, Marton, Meaux, Melbourne, Melmerby, Melmerby in Coverdale, Melsonby, Meltham, Melton, Meltonby, Menethorpe, Menston, Menthorpe, Metham, Methley, Mexborough, Micklebring, Micklefield, Middlecliffe, Middleham, Middlesbrough, Middlesmoor, Middlethorpe (East Riding of Yorkshire), Middlethorpe (North Yorkshire), Middleton (Cowling), Middleton-on-Wharfe, Middleton (North Yorkshire), Middleton (West Yorkshire), Middleton on the Wolds, Middleton Tyas, Midgley, Midhopestones, Mid Mossdale, Mill Bank, Millhouses (Barnsley), Millhouses (Sheffield), Millhouse Green, Millington, Mirfield, Mixenden, Molescroft, Monk Bretton, Moorends, Moorhouse, Moor Monkton, Morley, Morthen, Mosborough, Moss, Moulton End, Mount Tabor, Muker, Murton, Mytholmroyd

== N ==
- Naburn, Nafferton, Nawton, Nesfield, Nether Poppleton, Nether Silton, Netherby, Nether End, Netherthong, Nettleton Hill, New Crofton, New Earswick, New Edlington, New Ellerby, New Farnley, New Lodge, New Mill, New Rossington, Newton-on-Ouse, New Village, New York, Newbiggin (Askrigg), Newby, Newland (west), Newland (east), Newland Hall, Newmillerdam, Newport, Newsholme (East Riding of Yorkshire), Newsholme (West Yorkshire), Newton-on-Rawcliffe, Newton upon Derwent, Noblethorpe, Normanby, Normanton, Norristhorpe, Northallerton, North Anston, North Cave, North Cliffe, North Cowton, North Dalton, North Deighton, North Duffield, North Elmsall, North Ferriby, North Frodingham, North Grimston, North Howden, North Newbald, North Rigton, Northowram, Norton, Norton-on-Derwent, Nostell, Nosterfield, Notton, Nun Monkton, Nunburnholme, Nunkeeling, Nunthorpe

== O ==
- Oakenshaw (West Yorkshire), Oakworth, Octon, Old Cantley, Old Edlington, Old Ellerby, Old Lindley, Old Snydale, Old Thornville, Oldtown, Ormesby, Osgodby-by-the-Sea, Osgodby, Osmotherley, Ossett, Otley, Ottringham, Oughtibridge, Ousefleet, Ousethorpe, Outlane, Out Newton, Outwood, Ovenden, Over Dinsdale, Over Silton, Overthorpe, Overton, Owsthorpe, Owstwick, Oxenhope, Oxspring, Oxton

== P ==
- Painsthorpe, Pannal, Park Gate, Parkgate, Parlington, Pateley Bridge, Patrington, Patrington Haven, Paull, Penistone, Pepper Arden, Pickering, Pickhill, Picton, Pilley, Pincheon Green, Platts Common, Pledwick, Plumbley, Pockley, Pocklington, Pole Moor, Pollington, Pontefract, Portington, Potterton, Potto, North Yorkshire, Pool-in-Wharfedale, Preston, Preston-under-Scar, Primrose Valley, Pudsey

== Q ==
- Queensbury

== R ==
- Rainton, Ramsgill, Raw, Rawcliffe, Rawcliffe Bridge, Ravenfield, Ravenscar, Rawdon, Rawmarsh, Raywell, Redcar, Redmire, Reedness, Reeth, Reighton, Riccall, Richmond, Riddlesden, Rievaulx, Rillington, Rimswell, Ringinglow, Riplingham, Ripon, Ripponden, Risby, Rise, Roberttown, Roche Abbey, Robin Hood, Robin Hood's Bay, Roecliffe, Rolston, Rookwith, Roos, Rossington, Rotherham, Rothwell, Rotsea, Routh, Rowley, Roxby, Roydhouse, Royston, Rudston, Runswick Bay, Ruston, Ruston Parva, Ruswarp, Ryecroft (South Yorkshire), Ryecroft (West Yorkshire), Ryehill

== S ==
- Salt End, Saltaire, Saltburn-by-the-Sea, Saltergate, Saltmarshe, Sancton, Sandal Magna, Sandhills, Sandholme, Sand Hole, Sand Hutton, Sandsend, Satron, Sawdon, Saxton, Scagglethorpe, Scalby (East Riding of Yorkshire), Scaling, Scalby (North Yorkshire), Scampston, Scarborough, Scarcroft, Scarthingwell, Scapegoat Hill, Scawsby, Scawton, Scholes (South Yorkshire), Scholes (Cleckheaton, West Yorkshire), Scholes (Holme Valley, West Yorkshire), Scholes (Leeds, West Yorkshire), Scissett, Scorborough, Scorton, Scotton (Harrogate), Scotton (Richmondshire), Scrayingham, Seamer (Hambleton), Seamer (Scarborough), Seaton, Seaton Ross, Sedbergh, Sedbusk, Selby, Settle, Settrington, Sewerby, Shaftholme, Shafton, Sharlston, Sheffield, Shelf, Shelley, Shepley, Sheriff Hutton, Shibden, Shipley, Shipton by Beningbrough, Shiptonthorpe, Sicklinghall, Sigglesthorne, Silkstone, Silkstone Common, Silpho, Silsden, Sinnington, Skeeby, Skeffling, Skelbrooke, Skellow, Skelmanthorpe, Skelton, Skelton-on-Ure Skerne, Skidby, Skipsea, Skipsea Brough, Skipton, Skipwith, Skirethorns, Skirlaugh, Skirlington, Skirpenbeck, Slade Hooton, Slaithwaite, Sledmere, Sleights, Smithies, Snainton, Snaith, Sneaton, Snilesworth, South Anston, South Bank, South Cave, South Cliffe, South Crosland, South Dalton, South Elmsall, South Hiendley, South Kirkby, South Newbald, South Ossett, Southburn, Southowram, Sowerby (North Yorkshire), Sowerby (West Yorkshire), Sowerby Bridge, Sowood, Soyland, Spaldington, Spaunton, Speeton, Spennithorne, Spofforth, Sproatley, Sprotbrough, Sproxton, Spurn Head, Stainburn, Stainland, Staincross, Stainsacre, Stainton (Middlesbrough), Stainton (South Yorkshire), Stainton (west North Yorkshire), Staintondale, Stairfoot, Staithes, Stamford Bridge, Stanbury, Stancil, Stanley, Stannington, Stanwick, Stapleton, Starbeck, Staxton, Steeton, Stean, Stillingfleet, Stocksbridge, Stocksmoor, Stockton-on-the-Forest, Stokesley, Stone, Storwood, Streethouse, Strensall, Suffield, Summerbridge, Sunderlandwick, Sutton, Sutton Bank, Sutton-in-Craven, Sutton-on-Hull, Sutton-on-the-Forest, Sutton-under-Whitestonecliffe, Sutton upon Derwent, Swallownest, Swanland, Swillington, Swine, Swinefleet, Swinton (Harrogate), Swinton (Rotherham), Swinton (Ryedale), Sykehouse

== T ==
- Tadcaster, Tancred, Tankersley, Tansterne, Tanton, Teesville, Templeborough, Terrington, Thackley, Thearne, Thirn, Thirsk, Thirtleby, Thixendale, Thorganby, Thornaby-on-Tees, Thornbury (West Yorkshire), Thorncliffe, Thorne, Thorner, Thorngumbald, Thornholme, Thornton (West Yorkshire), Thornton (East Riding of Yorkshire), Thornton Dale, Thornton-in-Craven, Thornton in Lonsdale, Thornton-le-Clay, Thornton-le-Moor, Thornton-le-Street, Thornton-on-the-Hill, Thornton Rust, Thornton Steward, Thornton Watlass, Thorp Arch, Thorpe, Thorpe Bassett, Thorpe Audlin, Thorpe Edge, Thorpe le Street, Thorpe Hesley, Thorpe Salvin, Thorpe Underwood, Thorpe Willoughby, Threshfield, Thrintoft, Thruscross, Thrybergh, Thunder Bridge, Thurcroft, Thurgoland, Thurlstone, Thurnscoe, Thurstonland, Thwaite, Thwing, Tibthorpe, Tickhill, Tickton, Timble, Tingley, Tockwith, Todmorden, Todwick, Tollingham, Tong, Totley, Townhead, Towthorpe (East Riding of Yorkshire), Towthorpe (York), Towton, Treeton, Triangle, Troutsdale, Tunstall (East Riding of Yorkshire), Tunstall (North Yorkshire), Tyersal

== U ==
- Uckerby, Ugglebarnby, Ughill, Ugthorpe, Ulleskelf, Ulley, Ulrome, Ulshaw, Uncleby, Upper Cumberworth, Upper Denby, Upper Helmsley, Upper Midhope, Upper Poppleton, Upperthong

== V ==
- Vale of Pickering, Vale of York

== W ==
- Wadworth, Wakefield, Walden, Walden Stubbs, Wales, Walkington, Walsden, Walton, Wansford, Waplington, Ward Green, Warmfield, Warmsworth, Warter, Warthill, Wass, Wassand, Waterthorpe, Wath (near Ripon), Wath (Ryedale), Wath-in-Nidderdale, Wath upon Dearne, Watton, Wauldby, Wawne, Waxholme, Weel, Weeton (East Riding of Yorkshire), Weeton (North Yorkshire), Welburn, Welham, Welhambridge, Welton, Welwick, Wentbridge, Wentworth, West Ardsley, West Ayton, West Barnby, West Bretton, West Burton, West Cowick, West Ella, West End, Westerdale, West Hauxwell, West Heslerton, West Knapton, West Layton, West Lilling, West Lutton, West Melton, West Newton, Westow, West Stonesdale, Wetherby, Wetwang, Wharncliffe Side, Wharram-le-Street, Whaw, Wheldrake, Whenby, Whinmoor, Whirlow, Whiston, Whitby, Whitgift, Whitley, Whitwell-on-the-Hill, Whixley, Wickersley, Wigginton, Wigglesworth, Wigtwizzle, Wilberfoss, Wilfholme, Willerby, Willitoft, Wilsden, Wilsic, Wilsill, Wilsthorpe, Wilthorpe, Winestead, Winterburn, Wistow, Withernsea, Withernwick, Wold Newton, Wombwell, Womersley, Woodale, Woodlands, Woodhall, Woodhouse, Woodmansey, Woodsetts, Woolley, Woolley Colliery, Woolley Grange, Wormley Hill, Wortley, Worsbrough, Worton, Wothersome, Wragby, Wrelton, Wrench Green, Wressle, Wykeham (Ryedale), Wykeham (Scarborough), Wyton

== Y ==
- Yafforth, Yapham, Yarm, Yeadon, Yearsley, Yedingham, Yockenthwaite, Yokefleet, York, Youlthorpe, Youlton

== See also ==
- List of civil parishes in the East Riding of Yorkshire
- List of civil parishes in North Yorkshire
- List of civil parishes in South Yorkshire
- List of civil parishes in West Yorkshire
- List of places in England
