= List of settlements in North Yorkshire by population =

This is a list of settlements in North Yorkshire by population based on the results of the 2011 census. The next United Kingdom census took place in 2021.

== Population ranking ==
The 19 largest settlements of North Yorkshire, along with Malton. Cities and county town (Northallerton) in bold, district centres in yellow.

| Place | Population (2021) | Local authority | Defined as |
|---|---|---|---|
| Middlesbrough | 148,215 | Middlesbrough | Town |
| York | 141,685 | City of York | City |
| Harrogate | 75,515 | North Yorkshire | Town |
| Scarborough | 59,505 | North Yorkshire | Town |
| Redcar | 37,660 | Redcar and Cleveland | Town |
| Eston | 29,635 | Redcar and Cleveland | Town |
| Ingleby Barwick | 23,380 | Stockton-on-Tees (south) | Town |
| Thornaby-on-Tees | 23,350 | Stockton-on-Tees (south) | Town |
| Selby | 19,475 | North Yorkshire | Town |
| Guisborough | 18,095 | Redcar and Cleveland | Town |
| Ripon | 16,590 | North Yorkshire | City |
| Knaresborough | 15,785 | North Yorkshire | Town |
| Skipton | 15,050 | North Yorkshire | Town |
| Catterick Garrison | 14,210 | North Yorkshire | Town |
| Northallerton | 13,310 | North Yorkshire | Town |
| Whitby | 12,595 | North Yorkshire | Town |
| Huntington | 12,420 | City of York | Village |
| Haxby | 10,180 | City of York | Town |
| Yarm-on-Tees | 9,600 | Stockton-on-Tees (south) | Town |
| Richmond | 8,075 | North Yorkshire | Town |
| Norton-on-Derwent | 7,905 | North Yorkshire | Town |
| Marske-by-the-Sea | 7,580 | Redcar and Cleveland | Village |
| Pickering | 7,255 | North Yorkshire | Town |
| Skelton-in-Cleveland | 6,895 | Redcar and Cleveland | Town |
| Filey | 6,665 | North Yorkshire | Town |
| Tadcaster | 6,340 | North Yorkshire | Town |
| Malton | 6,320 | North Yorkshire | Town |
| Thirsk | 5,890 | North Yorkshire | Town |
| Saltburn-by-the-Sea | 5,875 | Redcar and Cleveland | Town |
| Brotton | 5,400 | Redcar and Cleveland | Village |

They are also multiple smaller settlements of North Yorkshire:

- Acomb, Alne, Ampleforth, Appleton-le-Moors, Appleton Wiske
- Bedale, Bishopthorpe, Bolton, Boroughbridge, Borrowby (west), Borrowby (east), Brompton (west), Brompton (east), Brotton, Buckden
- Castleton, Catterick, Catterick Garrison, Cawood, Clapham, Conistone, Copmanthorpe
- Dalton (east), Dalton (west), Dalton-on-Tees, Danby Wiske, Drax, Dunnington
- Easby, Easingwold, Egton, Elvington, Eston, Ebberston
- Filey, Flixton, Folkton
- Giggleswick, Gilling East, Gilling West, Glasshouses, Goathland, Grangetown, Grassington, Great Ayton, Grosmont, Guisborough, Ganton, Glaisdale
- Harrogate, Hawes, Haxby, Hebden, Helmsley, High Bentham, Hornton, Hunmanby, Huntington, Hutton Rudby
- Ingleton, Ingleby Arncliffe, Ingleby Barwick, Ingleby Greenhow
- Kettlewell, Kilnsey, Kirkbymoorside, Knaresborough
- Leyburn
- Malham, Malton, Masham, Marske-by-the-Sea, Middleham, Middlesbrough, Middleton (east), Middleton (middle), Middleton (west), Muston
- New Marske, Normanby, Northallerton, Norton, North Grimston,
- Ormesby, Osmotherley
- Pateley Bridge, Pickering
- Raskelf, Redcar, Reeth, Riccall, Richmond, Rievaulx, Rillington, Ripon, Robin Hood's Bay, Romanby
- Saltburn, Scagglethorpe, Scampston, Scarborough, Scorton, Selby, Settle, Sherburn, Sheriff Hutton, Shipton, Skelton (east), Skelton (middle), Skelton (west), Skinningrove, Skipton, Sowerby, Stillington, Stokesley, Streetlam, Sutton, Swinton
- Tadcaster, Teesville, Thirsk, Thornaby
- Westow, Whale Hill, Wheldrake, Whitby, Wintringham
- Yarm, York, Yedingham

== See also ==
- List of places in Yorkshire
- List of settlements in West Yorkshire by population
- List of settlements in County Durham by population
- North Yorkshire
- Demographics of Tees Valley
