= Crowden =

Crowden may refer to:

- Crowden, Derbyshire, England
- Crowden, a hamlet in the parish of Northlew, Devon, England

== See also ==
- Crowdon, a village in the county of North Yorkshire, England
