= Listed buildings in Stainton, South Yorkshire =

Stainton is a civil parish in the metropolitan borough of Doncaster, South Yorkshire, England. The parish contains 14 listed buildings that are recorded in the National Heritage List for England. Of these, one is listed at Grade II*, the middle of the three grades, and the others are at Grade II, the lowest grade. The parish contains the village of Stainton and the surrounding countryside. Most of the listed buildings are houses and associated structures, farmhouses and farm buildings, and the others are a church, memorials in the churchyard, and a milestone.

== Key ==
Grade	Criteria
II*	Particularly important buildings of more than special interest
II	Buildings of national importance and special interest

== Buildings ==
Name and location	Photograph	Date	Notes	Grade
St Winifred's Church; 53.43657°N 1.16578°W		12th century	The church was altered and extended through the centuries, and was restored during the 19th century. It is built in magnesian limestone with red tile roofs, and consists of a nave, a south porch, a south chapel under a separate roof, a chancel, and a west tower. The tower is Perpendicular in style, and has three stages, diagonal buttresses, a three-light west window, string courses, two-light bell openings, north and south gargoyles, and an embattled parapet with eight crocketed pinnacles.	II*
Lambcote Grange Farmhouse; 53.43683°N 1.19304°W	—	Late 16th to early 17th century	The oldest part is the rear wing, with the main range added in 1747. The main range is in magnesian limestone on a plinth, with rusticated quoins, bands, an eaves cornice, and a hipped tile roof. The rear wing is pebbledashed and a Welsh slate roof, hipped at the end. The main range has three storeys, and five bays. In the centre of the front is a French window with an architrave, a monogram in a roundel, and a segmental pediment on consoles. The windows are sashes, the centre window in the middle floor with an architrave and a shell motif, and the centre window in the top floor with a moulded sill and an apron. The rear wing has two storeys, a doorway with a quoined surround, a deep lintel, and an arched soffit, and the windows are casements.	II
Hall Farmhouse; 53.43709°N 1.16557°W		Late 17th century	A farmhouse in magnesian limestone, with rusticated quoins, bands, and a Welsh slate roof, hipped on the left and coped on the right with shaped kneelers. There are two storeys, four bays on the front and two on the left return, with the angle infilled by a wing. The doorway has an architrave, a plain frieze and a cornice, and the windows are cross windows. On the front is an inscribed stone plaque, and at the rear is a tall stair window.	II
Barn range, Lambcote Grange Farm; 53.43729°N 1.19264°W	—	1694	The range includes a barn and cowhouses with a loft, and they are in magnesian limestone with quoins and an asbestos sheet roof. There are two storeys, and an L-shaped plan, consisting of a barn range of eight bays, and a cowhouse at right angles with four bays. The openings in the barn include wagon entries, slit vents, and a dated oculus on the south gable end. The cowhouse has a doorway with a chamfered surround, slit vents, a single-light window, and external steps.	II
Farm building, Lambcote Grange Farm; 53.43689°N 1.19262°W	—	1695	The farm building is in magnesian limestone with quoins and an asbestos sheet roof. There are two storeys and four bays. On the east side are two flights of external steps, and the openings in the building include doorways, casement windows, and slit vents. On the south gable end is a date plaque.	II
Raised slab 53.43647°N 1.16560°W	—	1735	The raised slab in the churchyard of St Winifred's Church is to the memory of two children of the Staveley family. It is in magnesian limestone, and is a rectangular slab with a chamfered lower edge on plain blocks. On it is an arcaded panel with an inscription.	II
Wilsic Hall; 53.45670°N 1.15091°W	—	c. 1750	A small country house, later a school, it is roughcast, and has a stone slate roof. There is a double-pile plan, the main block has three storeys and a hipped roof. To the east is a two-storey L-shaped wing, and on the west end is a two-storey range of buildings. The garden front has seven bays, a central doorway with an architrave, a pulvinated frieze, and a pediment on consoles. To its left is a canted bay window with a pierced balustrade, the windows in the ground floor are sashes, in the upper floor they are casements, and above is a modillion eaves cornice. On the returns are shaped gables, and on the entrance front is a canted porch with an archivolt, moulded imposts, and a keystone.	II
Ha-ha and gate piers, Wilsic Hall; 53.45613°N 1.15107°W	—	c. 1750 (probable)	The ha-ha is to the south of the hall, it is in magnesian limestone, and consists of a plain wall with a ditch on the south side. At the east end are gate piers with moulded plinths and ogee tops.	II
Chest tomb 53.43646°N 1.16576°W	—	Late 18th century	The chest tomb in the churchyard of St Winifred's Church is in magnesian limestone, and stands on two steps. It has a moulded plinth, apsidal ends, a dentilled cornice, and a concave blocking stone with a socket. On the north side is a recessed panel, on the south side is an indecipherable inscription, and the ends have guilloché and fluted ornamentation.	II
Stainton Woodhouse and Cottage; 53.43701°N 1.15542°W	—	Late 18th to early 19th century	A large farmhouse, later divided, in magnesian limestone, mainly rendered, on a plinth, with an eaves band, and a hipped roof of Westmorland and Welsh slate. There are two storeys, a garden front of five bays, and two rear wings. In the centre of the garden front is a doorway, the outer bays are bowed with conical roofs, and the windows are sashes. The main entrance is in the left return, where curved steps lead up to a doorway with an architrave, a fanlight, an archivolt, a keystone with a patera, and a hood mould.	II
Dovecote, Stainton Woodhouse; 53.43760°N 1.15549°W	—	c. 1800 (probable)	The dovecote was later raised to contain a water tank. It is in magnesian limestone, it is raised in brick, and has a hipped pantile roof. There are three storeys and an octagonal plan. In the ground floor are three doorways and three windows, all with cambered heads, and the middle floor has a door with a sandstone surround, and a window with a ledge. Inside the ground floor are pigsties, and the middle floor contains nesting holes.	II
Holme Hall Farmhouse; 53.43991°N 1.17315°W	—	Early 19th century	The farmhouse is pebbledashed, on a plinth, with a sill band, and a green slate roof. There are two storeys, three bays, and a recessed single-bay wing on the right. Steps lead up to a central doorway with ribbed pilasters, a fanlight, and a cornice on consoles. The windows are sashes with lintels tooled as voussoirs. The windows in the wing are casements.	II
Milestone; 53.45623°N 1.14694°W		Early 19th century (probable)	The milestone is on the southwest side of the road opposite Home Farm, Wilsic. It consists of a round-headed pillar inscribed with the distance to Wentworth House.	II
Pair of silos, Wilsic Lodge Farm; 53.45022°N 1.16039°W	—	1920s	The pair of silos are in reinforced concrete. They are freestanding and cylindrical, they have integral ladder turrets, and the northern silo has an embattled parapet.	II
