= St Botolph's Church, Allerthorpe =

Church in Allerthorpe, East Riding of Yorkshire, England

Coordinates: 53°55′1.420″N 0°48′19.069″W

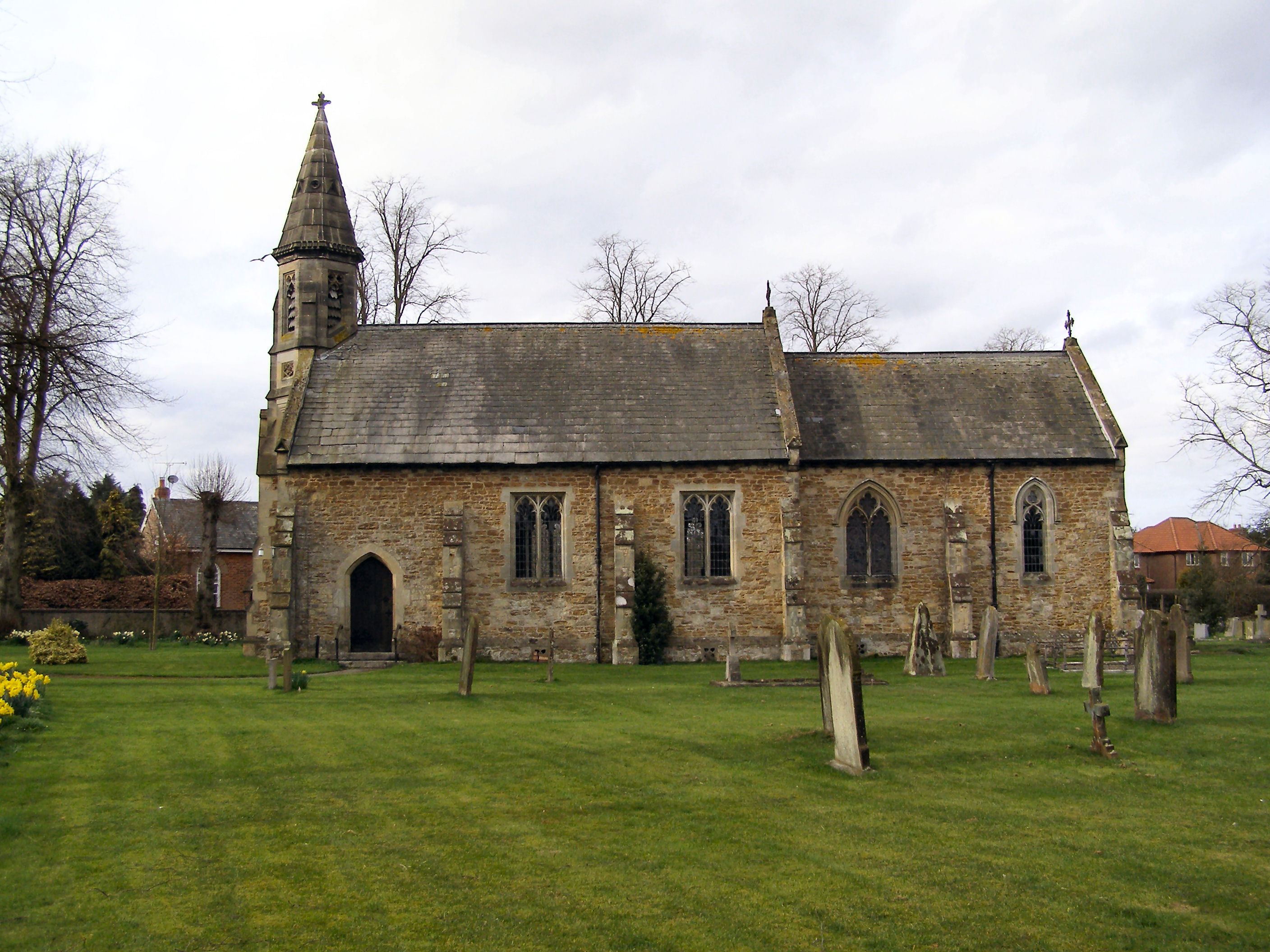
The church, in 2010

St Botolph's Church is the parish church of Allerthorpe, a village in the East Riding of Yorkshire, in England.

There was a church in Allerthorpe in the Mediaeval period, a small building with a chancel, nave, south porch and bellcote. A vestry was added in the early 19th century. It was demolished and rebuilt in 1876, to a Gothic revival design by J. B. and W. Atkinson. The building was grade II listed in 1987.

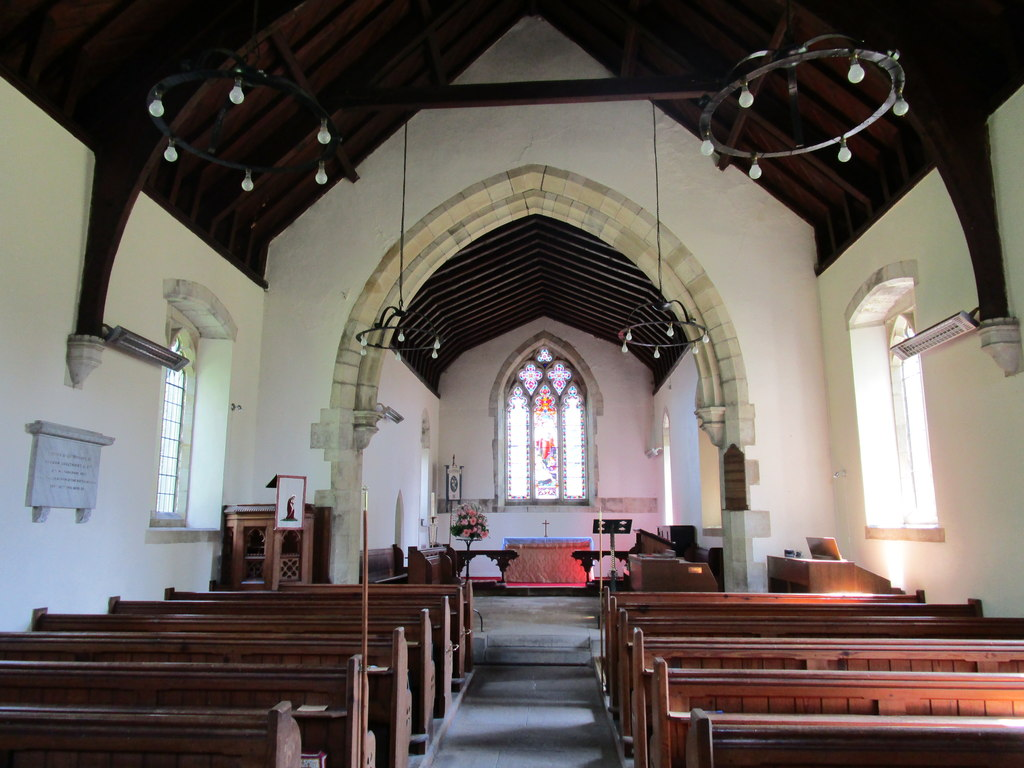
View from the nave into the chancel

The church is built of limestone with freestone dressings, and a slate roof. It consists of a three-bay nave and a lower two-bay chancel. On the west gable end is an octagonal bell turret corbelled out over a buttress. It contains bell openings under a brattished cornice, and is surmounted by a spire with lucarnes and a poppy-head finial.

== See also ==
- Listed buildings in Allerthorpe
