= Listed buildings in Clayton with Frickley =

Clayton with Frickley is a civil parish in the metropolitan borough of Doncaster, South Yorkshire, England. The parish contains seven listed buildings that are recorded in the National Heritage List for England. Of these, one is listed at Grade II*, the middle of the three grades, and the others are at Grade II, the lowest grade. The parish contains the villages of Clayton and Frickley and the surrounding countryside. The listed buildings consist of a church, the remains of a 17th-century house incorporated within farm buildings, a country house, a range of farm buildings, two farmhouses, and a war memorial.

== Key ==
Grade	Criteria
II*	Particularly important buildings of more than special interest
II	Buildings of national importance and special interest

== Buildings ==
Name and location	Photograph	Date	Notes	Grade
All Saints Church, Frickley; 53.56548°N 1.29416°W		12th century	The church, which stands in an isolated position in fields, was altered through the centuries, particularly in 1872–73, when it was restored and extended. It is built in stone with a stone slate roof, and consists of a nave with a clerestory, north and south aisles with a south porch and chapel, a chancel with a north chapel and south vestry, and a west tower. The tower has quoins, a chamfered string course, slit windows, two-light bell windows, a moulded course with gargoyles, an embattled parapet, and a recessed octagonal spirelet.	II*
Remains of 17-century house 53.57206°N 1.29004°W	—	Mid 17th century	The remains of the house have been incorporated within farm buildings. They are in sandstone with a chamfered plinth and a stone slate roof, and there are two storeys. The central doorway has a chamfered surround and a deep lintel, it is flanked by three-light chamfered mullioned windows, and above it is a four-light window.	II
Frickley Hall; 53.57124°N 1.29480°W		c. 1760s	A country house that was extended in about 1820, it is in sandstone, with a modillion cornice, and a hipped Westmorland slate roof. There are two storeys, a front of seven bays, a recessed bay on the left, and a three-storey double service wing at the rear on the right. The middle three bays of the front project under a pediment containing an oeil-de-boeuf with keystones. In the centre of the front is a French window with an architrave, a pulvinated frieze, and a cornice on consoles. The windows are sashes, some with cornices on consoles. The entrance in the right return has a Doric porch with a pediment.	II
Manor Farmhouse; 53.56488°N 1.31486°W	—	Mid to late 18th century	The farmhouse is in red brick, with stone slate eaves courses, an eaves band, and a tile roof. There are two storeys and attics, three bays, a single-storey extension on the right, and a rear outshut. The windows are horizontally-sliding sashes with segmental-arched heads.	II
Hallbridge Farmhouse; 53.56487°N 1.31648°W		Late 18th century	The farmhouse is in red brick, and has a Welsh slate roof with coped gables and shaped kneelers. There are two storeys and three bays. Above the central doorway is a small window with a quatrefoil surround, and the other windows are casements with wedge lintels.	II
Garden Cottage coach house and stable block 53.57221°N 1.29715°W	—	c. 1800	The range of buildings in the grounds of Frickley Hall is in red brick with Welsh slate roofs, and there are two storeys. In the centre is the coach house with three bays, flanked by lower wings, on the left the stable block, and on the right are two cottages later combined into one. The coach house has a chamfered plinth, a moulded string course, paired gutter brackets, and coped gables with kneelers. In the centre of the ground floor are garage doors, flanked by round-headed doorways with fanlights, and the upper floor contains three Diocletian windows. The left wing has two doorways with fanlights, and windows with cambered arches, and the roof is hipped on the left. The cottage on the right has a doorway with a fanlight, windows with cambered heads, a hipped roof, and a lean-to on the right.	II
War memorial 53.56432°N 1.31432°W		c. 1920	The war memorial is in a small garden by a road junction. It is in stone and consists of a simple Latin cross with a tapering octagonal column, on an octagonal plinth, on a base of three octagonal steps. On the plinth is an inscription and the names of those lost in the two World Wars.	II
