= St Michael's Church, Catwick =

Church in Catwick, East Riding of Yorkshire, England

Coordinates: 53°53′32″N 0°16′50″W

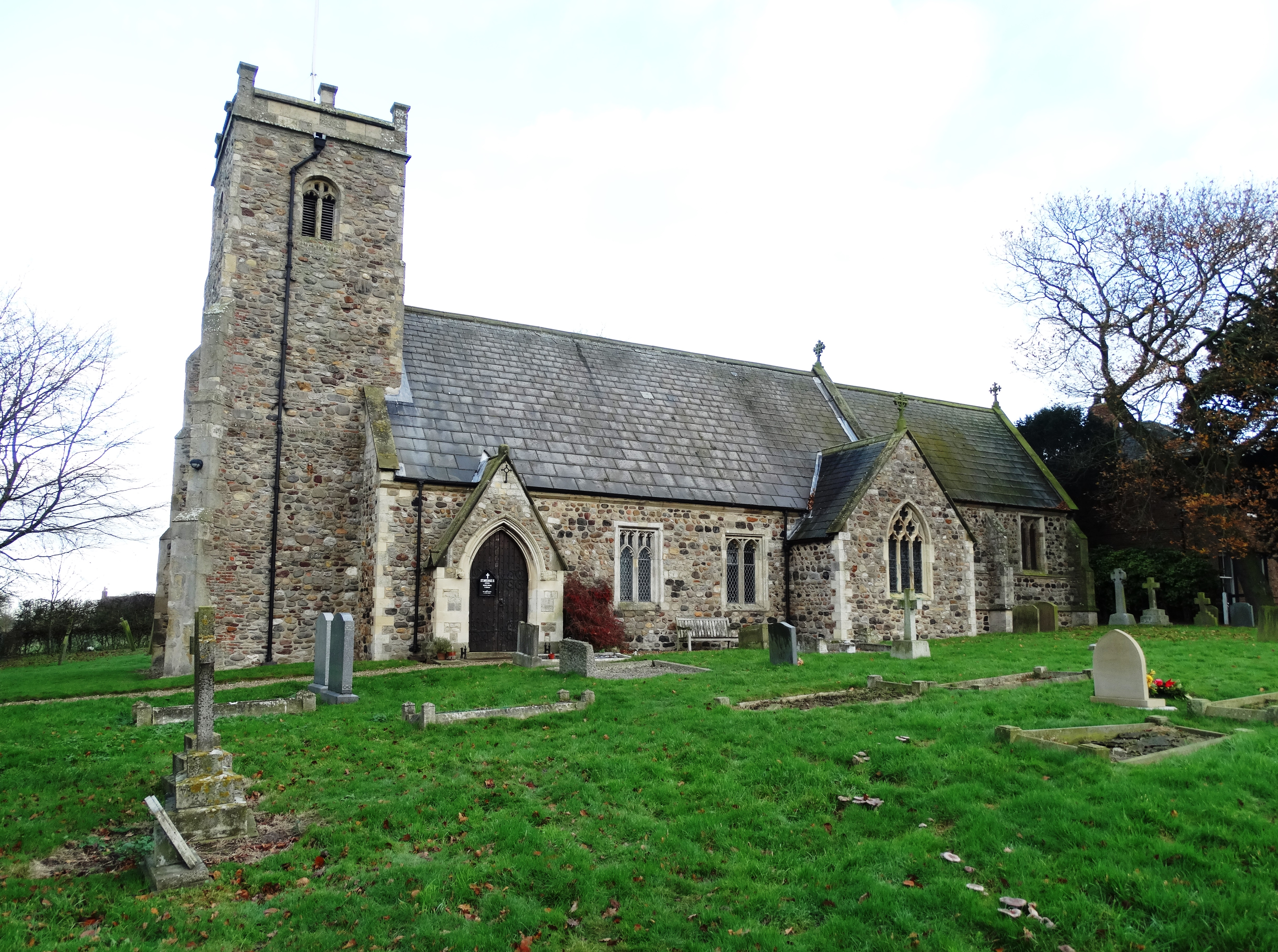
The church, in 2014

St Michael's Church is the parish church of Catwick, a village in the East Riding of Yorkshire, in England.

A church in Catwick was recorded in the Domesday Book. By the start of the 14th century, it consisted of a nave, chancel and south porch, with north and south chapels added in the early 14th century. A tower was added in the 15th century, and this is the oldest surviving part of the current building. The remainder of the church was rebuilt in 1863, to a design by James Mallinson and Thomas Healey, reusing old materials. It is in the Gothic revival style, and has the same plan as the building it replaced, other than the addition of a vestry. The building was grade II* listed in 1966, and was externally cleaned in 1992 and 1993.

The church is built of cobbles, with some red brick, stone dressings and a slate roof. The church consists of a nave, a south porch, north and south transepts, a chancel and a west tower. The tower has three stages, diagonal buttresses, two-light bell openings with segmental heads containing Perpendicular tracery, and a parapet with small corner and central turrets. Inside, there is a carved figure from about 1100, which may represent Saint Michael, and a stoup which was found in the churchyard.

== See also ==
- Grade II* listed buildings in the East Riding of Yorkshire
- Listed buildings in Catwick
