= Fangfoss Hall =

House in Fangfoss, East Riding of Yorkshire, England

Coordinates: 53°58′15″N 0°49′54″W

Fangfoss Hall is a historic building in Fangfoss, a village in the East Riding of Yorkshire, in England.

A large house in Fangfoss was first recorded in 1563, probably on a moated site. It was probably demolished when the current house was constructed in 1766, to a design by John Carr. The interior was partly redesigned in about 1840. The house was divided into apartments in 1957. The building was grade II* listed in 1967. It was partly restored in 1989.

The house is built of reddish-brown brick on a stone plinth, with stone dressings, sill bands, a floor band, a modillion eaves cornice and a hipped slate roof. There are three storeys and five bays. On the west front, steps lead up to a doorway with a rusticated surround and a fanlight with radial glazing, in a Tuscan porch with a low pediment. The windows are sashes under slightly cambered gauged brick arches. On the east front is a porch with Ionic columns.

== See also ==
- Grade II* listed buildings in the East Riding of Yorkshire
- Listed buildings in Fangfoss
