= Listed buildings in Swinton, Ryedale =

Swinton, Ryedale is a civil parish in the county of North Yorkshire, England. It contains two listed buildings that are recorded in the National Heritage List for England. Both the listed buildings are designated at Grade II, the lowest of the three grades, which is applied to "buildings of national importance and special interest". The parish contains the village of Swinton and the surrounding countryside, and the listed buildings consist of a farmhouse and a milepost.

== Buildings ==
Name and location	Photograph	Date	Notes
Close Farmhouse; 54.13636°N 0.83494°W		Mid to late 18th century	The farmhouse is in pink-red brick, with stone at the rear, a dentilled eaves course, and a pantile roof with coped gables and shaped kneelers. There are two storeys and two bays, and a single-storey rear outshut. The central doorway has a fanlight, and the windows are sashes, those on the upper floor are horizontally sliding, and there are small roof lights.
Milepost; 54.14848°N 0.83731°W		Late 19th century	The milepost on the north side of High Street (B1257 road) is in cast iron. It has a triangular plan, and a sloping upper face. On each side are pointing hands, on the left side is the distance to Malton, and on the right side the distances to Helmsley and Kirkbymoorside.
