= St Martin's Church, Fangfoss =

Church in Fangfoss, East Riding of Yorkshire, England

Coordinates: 53°58′14″N 0°49′57″W

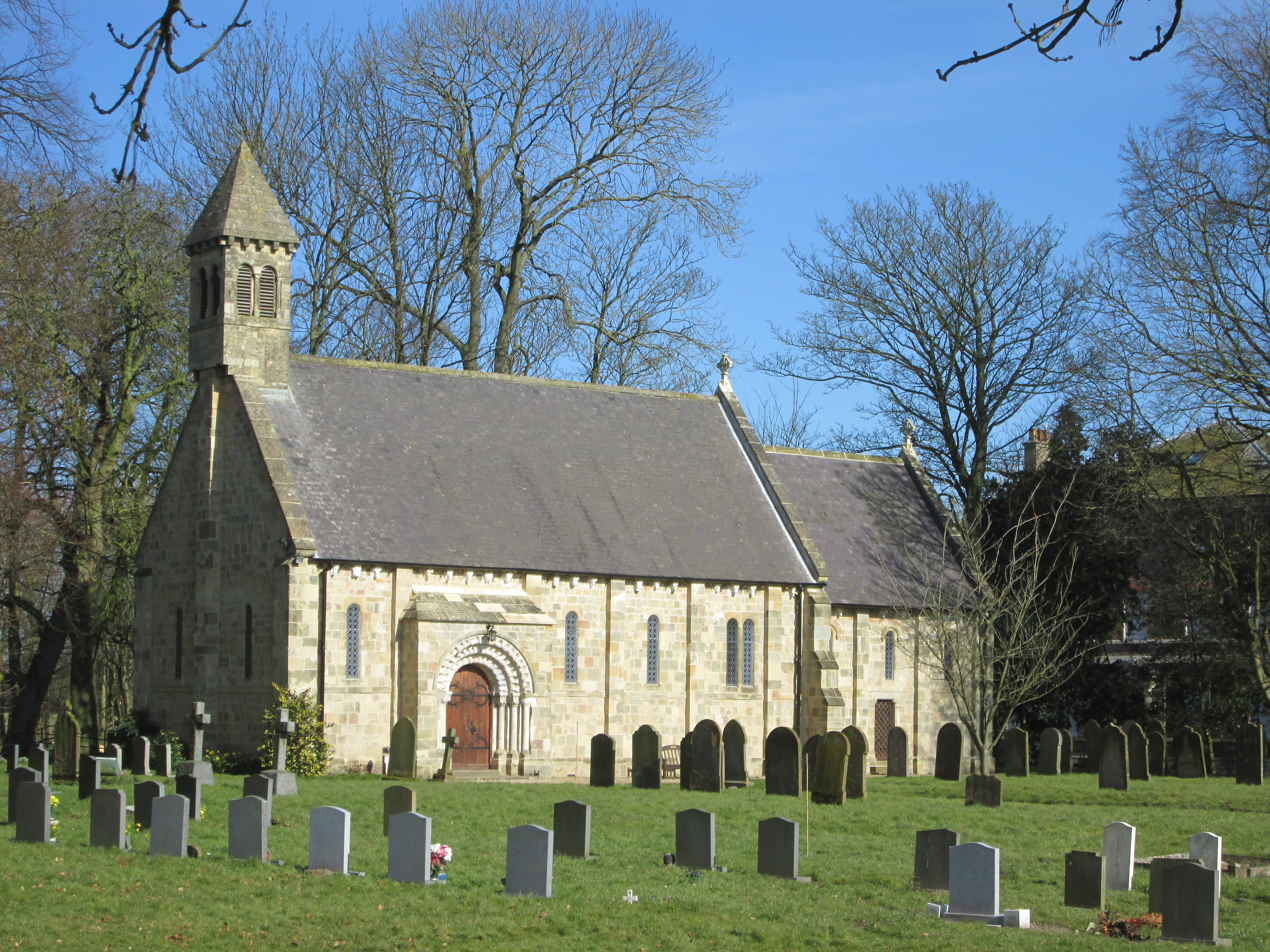
The church, in 2016

St Martin's Church is the parish church of Fangfoss, a village in the East Riding of Yorkshire, in England.

A church in Fangfoss was built in or before the 12th century. It consisted of a nave, chancel, south porch and west tower. It often shared a vicar with St Catherine's Church, Barmby Moor. The church was heavily restored in the 18th century, and in the early 19th century, the apse at the end of the chancel was demolished, and the tower rebuilt in brick. Between 1848 and 1850, the church was rebuilt to a Norman design by Robert Dennis Chantrell, reusing the old stonework. The church was then dedicated to Mary, mother of Jesus and was for a time dedicated to John the Apostle. The church was grade II* listed in 1967.

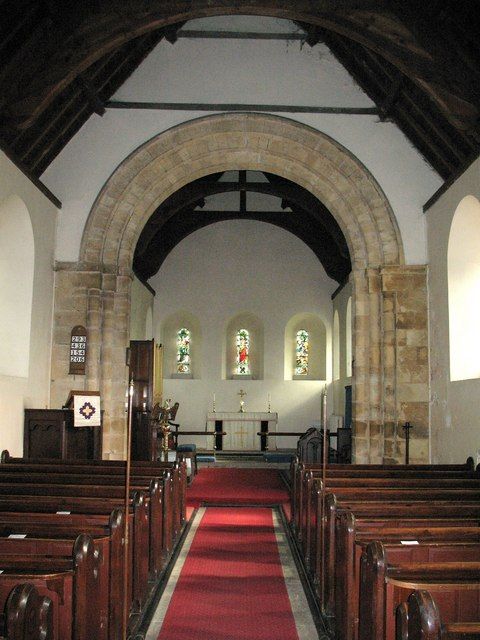
View from the nave into the chancel

The church is built of stone with a slate roof, and consists of a nave, a shallow south porch, and a chancel. On the west gable is a bellcote with two round-headed openings, a corbel table and a pyramidal stone roof. The mediaeval south door has a round head, and three orders with decorations including beakheads.

== See also ==
- Grade II* listed buildings in the East Riding of Yorkshire
- Listed buildings in Fangfoss
