= Listed buildings in Fangfoss =

Fangfoss is a civil parish in the county of the East Riding of Yorkshire, England. It contains seven listed buildings that are recorded in the National Heritage List for England. Of these, two are listed at Grade II*, the middle of the three grades, and the others are at Grade II, the lowest grade. The parish contains the village of Fangfoss and the surrounding countryside, and the listed buildings consist of houses, a stable block, a church and a former railway station.

== Key ==
Grade	Criteria
II*	Particularly important buildings of more than special interest
II	Buildings of national importance and special interest

== Buildings ==
Name and location	Photograph	Date	Notes	Grade
St Martin's Church; 53.97053°N 0.83241°W		12th century	The church was largely rebuilt in 1849–50 by R. D. Chantrell re-using Norman masonry. It is built in stone with a slate roof, and consists of a nave, a shallow south porch, and a chancel. On the west gable is a bellcote with two round-headed openings, a corbel table and a pyramidal stone roof. The south door has a round head, and three orders with decorations including beakheads.	II*
Bolton Hall; 53.95368°N 0.85072°W	—	Mid to late 17th century	The house is in colourwashed brick, with moulded eaves, raked cornices, and a hipped slate roof. There are two storeys and five bays, the middle three bays projecting under a pediment containing an oculus with radial glazing. The doorway has pilasters, a fanlight with radial glazing, and a segmental pediment on consoles, and the windows are sashes under slightly cambered gauged brick arches.	II
Ivy Farmhouse; 53.97059°N 0.83437°W	—	Mid-18th century	The house is in red brick, and has a pantile roof with raised coped gables. There are two storeys and three bays. The central doorway has a fanlight, the windows are sashes, and all the openings are under segmental brick arches.	II
Fangfoss Hall; 53.97081°N 0.83175°W	—	Late 18th century	The house is in reddish-brown brick on a stone plinth, with stone dressings, sill bands, a floor band, a modillion eaves cornice and a hipped slate roof. There are three storeys and five bays. On the west front, steps lead up to a doorway with a rusticated surround and a fanlight with radial glazing, in a Tuscan porch with a low pediment. The windows are sashes under slightly cambered gauged brick arches. On the east front is a porch with Ionic columns.	II*
Stables, Fangfoss Hall; 53.97093°N 0.83205°W	—	Late 18th century	The stable block is in red brick, with a stepped brick eaves cornice, and a hipped slate roof. There are two storeys and six bays, the middle bays projecting slightly. On the front are two blocked doorways and sash windows, all under flat gauged brick arches.	II
Fangfoss railway station 53.96533°N 0.86216°W		1847	The railway station, later a private house, was designed by G. T. Andrews for the York and North Midland Railway. It is in brown brick, with stone dressings, a moulded floor band, and a slate roof with oversailing eaves. There are two storeys and three bays, the middle bay projecting under a low gable. This bay contains a canted bay window with a dentilled cornice, above which are a pair of round-headed windows and an oculus. The windows on the outer bays are sashes under slightly cambered gauged brick arches in recesses with slightly cambered gauged brick arches.	II
The Manor House; 53.97009°N 0.83186°W	—	Mid-19th century	The house is in yellow brick, with a floor band and a hipped slate roof. There are two storeys and three bays. In the centre is a Tuscan porch, and a doorway with a fanlight in panelled reveals and a soffit. The windows are sashes, under cambered channelled wedge lintels with decorated keystones.	II
