= Listed buildings in Borrowby, east North Yorkshire =

Borrowby is a civil parish in the county of North Yorkshire, England. It contains seven listed buildings that are recorded in the National Heritage List for England. All the listed buildings are designated at Grade II, the lowest of the three grades, which is applied to "buildings of national importance and special interest". The parish contains the village of Borrowby and the surrounding countryside. Apart from a cottage in the village, all the listed buildings are farmhouses and farm buildings in the countryside.

== Buildings ==
Name and location	Photograph	Date	Notes
Ivy Cottage; 54.52963°N 0.81107°W		Early 18th century (probable)	The cottage is in stone, and has a pantile roof with stone copings. There are two storeys and three bays. Some windows have chamfered surrounds, one is a sash window, and the others are 20th-century casements.
Plum Tree Farmhouse; 54.54256°N 0.79542°W		Late 18th century	The farmhouse and cottage, later combined, are in stone and have a pantile roof with stone copings. The house part has two storeys and two bays, and contains tripartite sash windows. The cottage part to the left has one storey and an attic and one bay, it contains a doorway and a dormer, and to the right is a small extension.
Low Borrowby Farmhouse; 54.53019°N 0.80560°W	—	Late 18th or early 19th century	The farmhouse is in stone, and has a pantile roof with stone kneelers. There are two storeys and three bays. There is one sash window, and the other windows and the doorway are modern.
Barn, byres and stables, Low Borrowby Farm; 54.53055°N 0.80519°W	—	Late 18th or early 19th century	The farm buildings are in stone, and have pantile roofs with stone gable copings. They form a U-shaped plan, the north range with two storeys, and elsewhere with one storey. The buildings contain doorways, including some stable doors, and smaller openings.
Barns, byres and cartshed, Borrowby Farm; 54.53054°N 0.80973°W	—	Early 19th century (probable)	The farm buildings are in stone with pantile roofs, and are arranged around a farmyard. They are mainly in one storey, and a byre and a cartshed have a hayloft. The openings include doorways, stable doors, boarded or slatted windows, and a segmental-headed cart entrance with cut voussoirs.
Barn and gin gang, Plum Tree Farm; 54.54270°N 0.79537°W	—	Early 19th century (probable)	The barn and attached gin gang are in stone with pantile roofs. The gin gang has a semi-octagonal end.
Borrowby Farmhouse; 54.53039°N 0.81012°W	—	Early to mid 19th century	A farmhouse and cottage combined into one building, it is in stone and has a pantile roof with stone copings. The house part has two storeys and two bays, and the cottage part is lower, also with two storeys and two bays. In the cottage part is a tripartite window, and the other windows are modern.
