= Yapham =

Village in the East Riding of Yorkshire, England

Coordinates: 53.958766°N 0.800158°W

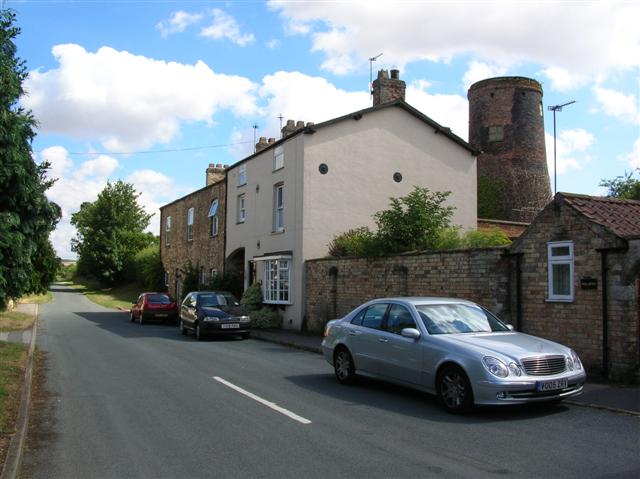
- Main street, Yapham

- Location within the East Riding of Yorkshire
- Population: 217 (2011 census)
- OS grid reference: SE788520
- Civil parish: Yapham
- Unitary authority: East Riding of Yorkshire
- Ceremonial county: East Riding of Yorkshire
- Region: Yorkshire and the Humber
- Country: England
- Sovereign state: United Kingdom
- Post town: YORK
- Postcode district: YO42
- Dialling code: 01759
- Police: Humberside
- Fire: Humberside
- Ambulance: Yorkshire
- UK Parliament: Bridlington and The Wolds

Yapham is a village and civil parish in the East Riding of Yorkshire, Northern England. It is situated about 2 miles (3.2 km) north-east of Pocklington. The parish includes the hamlet of Meltonby and is approximately 1,830 acres (740 ha).

The name Yapham derives from the plural form of the Old English gēap meaning 'steep place'.

The village was originally known as Iapun / Lapun and the first reference of the village can be found in the Domesday Book (1086). The village was later known as Yapome with further references in Ancient Petitions, Henry III – James I (1390) when William Lokton petitioned the King for the restoration of the manor of Bolton and other property in Yapome (Yapham). It is not known when the current spelling of the name was adopted.

The village Church, St Martin's, is a small church was partially rebuilt in 1777–8. It consists of chancel and nave, with a western turret, containing one bell. The church was designated a Grade II* listed building in 1967 and is now recorded in the National Heritage List for England, maintained by Historic England. In November 2024 the church was placed on the Heritage at Risk Register by Historic England who gave a grant to start repairs. The Wesleyans built a chapel in 1865 however this has been converted into a private house in the 1980s.

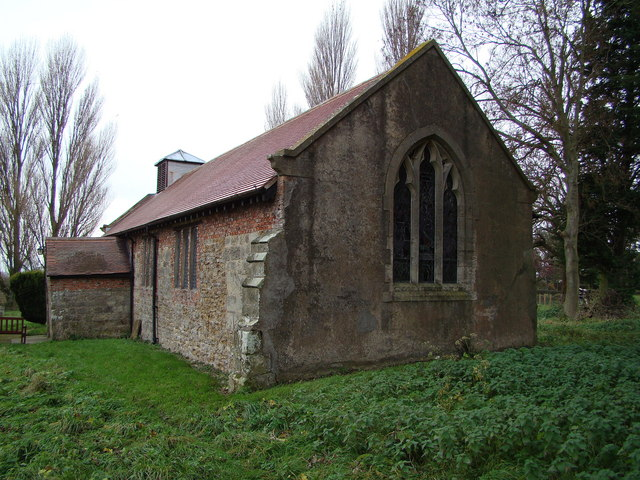
Saint Martins Church

A school has served the village and surrounding area since before 1773 with a new school built in 1875 to accommodate up to 45 children. The school closed in 1972 with the remaining children transferring to St Martin's Church of England Voluntary Aided Primary School in Fangfoss. The old school buildings are now used as a village hall.

Yapham was served by Yapham Gate railway station on the York–Beverley line for a short while between 1855 and 1865.

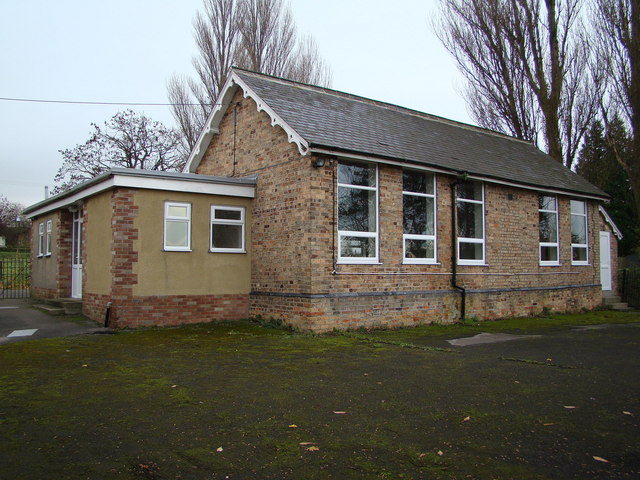
Yapham Village Hall

The population of Yapham has remained reasonably unchanged for many years with the 1891 UK census identifying a population of 191 with the 2001 UK census identifying a population of 175. Since 2001, however there have been a number of new houses built in the village. The population of the civil parish at the 2011 Census was shown as 217. Although the civil parish is called "Yapham" its parish council is called "Yapham cum Meltonby Parish Council".

Yapham was formerly a township and chapelry in the parish of Pocklington, in 1866 it became a civil parish as Yapham cum Meltonby, on 1 April 1935 the parish was renamed to "Yapham".

Yapham Cricket Club has been playing at the Cricket Ground on the edge of the village for almost 100 years and is one of only a few clubs to play on through the war. The club now has a strong junior section as well as both Men's and Ladies Senior Teams.

The Gravel Pit Allotment Association was formed in 2009 to convert the old gravel pit field in between Yapham and Meltonby into community allotments.

== See also ==
- Listed buildings in Yapham
