= Listed buildings in Yapham =

Yapham is a civil parish in the county of the East Riding of Yorkshire, England. It contains two listed buildings that are recorded in the National Heritage List for England. Of these, one is listed at Grade II*, the middle of the three grades, and the other is at Grade II, the lowest grade. The parish contains the village of Yapham and the surrounding countryside, and the listed buildings consist of a church and a disused windmill.

== Key ==
Grade	Criteria
II*	Particularly important buildings of more than special interest
II	Buildings of national importance and special interest

== Buildings ==
Name and location	Photograph	Date	Notes	Grade
St Martin's Church; 53.95775°N 0.79929°W		13th century (probable)	The church has been altered through the centuries, and was largely rebuilt in 1777–78. It is built in stone, partly rendered, with alterations in brick, and has a tile roof with raised coped gables and shaped kneelers. The church consists of a five-bay nave and chancel in one unit, with a south porch and a louvred west bellcote. The doorway has a segmental head and a keystone carved with a heart and an illegible inscription.	II*
Windmill; 53.94484°N 0.79820°W		Late 18th century	The disused windmill is in red brick. It consists of a circular tower of five storeys, the lower three storeys tapering, the upper two almost cylindrical. It contains windows under segmental brick arches, and has a stepped brick cornice.	II
