= Listed buildings in Middleton-on-Wharfe =

Middleton-on-Wharfe is a civil parish in the county of North Yorkshire, England. It contains three listed buildings that are recorded in the National Heritage List for England. All the listed buildings are designated at Grade II, the lowest of the three grades, which is applied to "buildings of national importance and special interest". The parish contains the village of Middleton and the surrounding countryside, and all the listed buildings are houses.

== Buildings ==
Name and location	Photograph	Date	Notes
Red Gables; 53.93893°N 1.81473°W	—	16th century (probable)	A house divided into two cottages, with a timber framed core, it was enclosed in brick in the 17th century, and has a red tile roof. There is one storey with attic, four bays and a rear outshut. On the front are doorways and horizontally-sliding sash windows, and in the attic are gabled dormers. The rear contains a two-light mullioned window, and in the left return is a blocked mullioned window.
West Moor Farmhouse; 53.95224°N 1.81454°W		17th century	The house is in gritstone with quoins and two storeys. The main block has three bays, and to the right is a lower two-bay wing. The main block has a stone slate roof, and in the centre is a doorway with a plain surround. The wing has a slate roof, and in both parts are mullioned windows.
Lane End Farmhouse and barn 53.93955°N 1.81503°W		Early 18th century (probable)	The house and attached barn are in gritstone, and have a stone slate roof with gable copings, and two storeys. The house has two bays, quoins, a central doorway with a quoined surround, and mullioned windows. The barn has three bays, and contains two byre doors with plain surrounds, square pitching doors, and two tiers of slit vents.
