= Jaw Hill =

Hill in West Yorkshire, England

Coordinates: 53.7057°N 1.5573°W

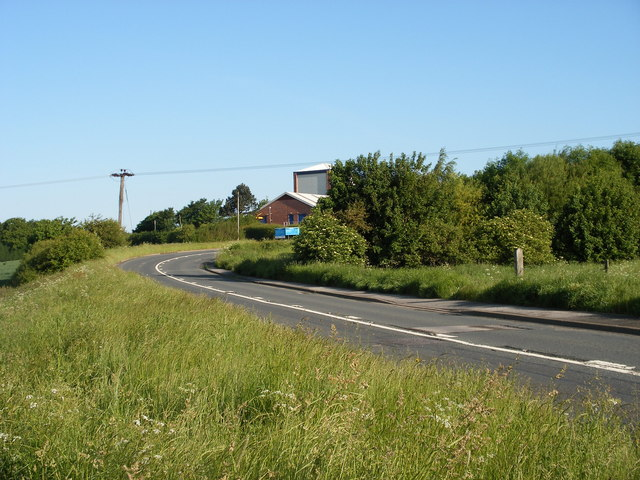
Jaw Hill

Jaw Hill is a hill in the City of Leeds district of West Yorkshire, England. It is near Kirkhamgate in the City of Wakefield district.

== History ==
A large square cropmark enclosure was investigated in 1995, when it was thought to be a possible Roman marching camp. The site had V-shaped east and west ditches, both of which had evidence for a revetted defensive bank with lines of post-holes.

The base of a greyware vessel dating from the 2nd to 4th century was found on the site.
