= Listed buildings in Catwick =

Catwick is a civil parish in the county of the East Riding of Yorkshire, England. It contains five listed buildings that are recorded in the National Heritage List for England. Of these, one is listed at Grade II*, the middle of the three grades, and the others are at Grade II, the lowest grade. The parish contains the village of Catwick and the surrounding countryside. The listed buildings consist of a church, a wall with an arch, two houses and a stable block.

== Key ==
Grade	Criteria
II*	Particularly important buildings of more than special interest
II	Buildings of national importance and special interest

== Buildings ==
Name and location	Photograph	Date	Notes	Grade
Wall and Norman gate, The Old Rectory Garden; 53.89345°N 0.28007°W	—	11th century	The wall extends along the front garden for about 30 metres (98 ft), and it was rebuilt in 1863–63. It is in red brick, it is over 2 metres (6 ft 7 in) in height, and has terracotta coping. In the centre is a segmental arch containing the Norman stone jambs of a former church, consisting of fragmentary plain circular stone shafts with cushion capitals. The upper part of the arch is in red brick.	II
St Michael's Church; 53.89235°N 0.28066°W		15th century	The oldest part of the church is the tower, the rest of the church being rebuilt in 1862–63 by Mallinson and Healey. It is built in cobbles, with some red brick, stone dressings and a slate roof. The church consists of a nave, a south porch, north and south transepts, a chancel and a west tower. The tower has three stages, diagonal buttresses, two-light bell openings with segmental heads containing Perpendicular tracery, and a parapet with small corner and central turrets.	II*
Cobble Hall; 53.88741°N 0.26099°W		c. 1730	The house is built in cobbles, with brick dressings, a triple-stepped brick eaves cornice, and a hipped pantile roof. There are two storeys and three bays. The middle bay projects slightly and contains a porch and a doorway. The windows are sashes, those on the ground floor under segmental brick arches.	II
Catwick House; 53.89379°N 0.27962°W	—	Late 18th century	The house is in orange brick, with red brick dressings, and a hipped slate roof with a central well. There are two storeys, a double depth plan, and three bays. On the front are sash windows under flat gauged brick arches. The doorway on the right return has pilasters, a blocked rectangular fanlight with radial glazing, and a cornice on consoles.	II
Stable block, Catwick House; 53.89391°N 0.27940°W	—	Late 18th century	The stable block is in orange brick, and has a hipped pantile roof. There are two storeys and three bays. On the left are two doorways under segmental heads, in the centre is a carriage arch under a segmental head, and to the right is a round-headed doorway flanked by windows under segmental heads. On the upper floor are two oculi.	II
