= Listed buildings in Allerthorpe =

Allerthorpe is a civil parish in the county of the East Riding of Yorkshire, England. It contains six listed buildings that are recorded in the National Heritage List for England. All the listed buildings are designated at Grade II, the lowest of the three grades, which is applied to "buildings of national importance and special interest". The parish contains the village of Allerthorpe and the surrounding countryside, and the listed buildings consist of houses, a canal lock, a church and a telephone kiosk.

== Buildings ==
Name and location	Photograph	Date	Notes
The Gables; 53.91653°N 0.80685°W		17th century	The house is in red brick with a dentilled eaves cornice and a slate roof. There are two storeys and an H-shaped plan, with a hall range and projecting gabled cross-wings. The doorway is at the rear, the windows on the front are sashes, mostly under a segmental brick arch, and at the rear they have top-opening lights. Inside there is an inglenook fireplace with a chamfered bressumer.
Low Farmhouse; 53.90687°N 0.80759°W	—	Late 18th to early 19th century	The house is in brown brick, with a dentilled eaves cornice, and a tile roof with tumbled-in brick verges. There are two storeys and three bays. The central doorway has a fanlight, and the windows are sashes under segmental brick arches.
The Grange and The Rookery; 53.91523°N 0.80842°W	—	1802–09	A house later extended, and then divided into two. It is in brown brick with red brick quoins, moulded eaves cornices, and hipped slate roofs. The main block has three storeys and three bays. On the front is a square bay window and sash windows under gauged brick arches. The extension on the left has two storeys and three bays. The doorway has attached columns imposts, a fanlight with radial glazing, and a dentilled cornice. It also has a square bay window and sashes.
Giles Lock, Pocklington Canal; 53.90727°N 0.79118°W		c. 1813	The canal lock is in red brick with gritstone dressings. The lock chamber has parallel sides with rounded splays, stepped to the lower end.
St Botolph's Church; 53.91708°N 0.80533°W		1876	The church, designed by J. B. and W. Atkinson, is in limestone with freestone dressings, and a slate roof. It consists of a three-bay nave and a lower two-bay chancel. On the west gable end is an octagonal bell turret corbelled out over a buttress. It contains bell openings under a brattished cornice, and is surmounted by a spire with lucarnes and a poppy-head finial.
Telephone kiosk 53.91669°N 0.80653°W		1935	The telephone kiosk in Main Street is of the K6 type designed by Giles Gilbert Scott. Constructed in cast iron with a square plan and a dome, it has three unperforated crowns in the top panels.
