= Coniston, East Riding of Yorkshire =

Village and civil parish in the East Riding of Yorkshire, England

Coordinates: 53.800411°N 0.246892°W

Coniston
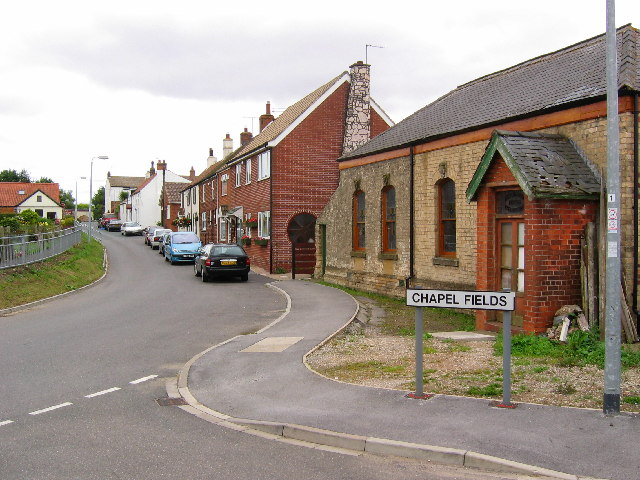
- Coniston Main street

- Location within the East Riding of Yorkshire
- Population: 319 (2011 census)
- OS grid reference: TA155352
  - London: 165 mi (266 km) S
- Civil parish: Coniston
- Unitary authority: East Riding of Yorkshire
- Ceremonial county: East Riding of Yorkshire
- Region: Yorkshire and the Humber
- Country: England
- Sovereign state: United Kingdom
- Post town: HULL
- Postcode district: HU11
- Dialling code: 01482
- Police: Humberside
- Fire: Humberside
- Ambulance: Yorkshire
- UK Parliament: Beverley and Holderness

Coniston is a village and civil parish in the East Riding of Yorkshire, England, in an area known as Holderness. It is situated approximately 6 miles (10 km) north-east of Hull city centre and less than 1 mile (1.6 km) north-east of the village of Ganstead. It lies on the A165 road.

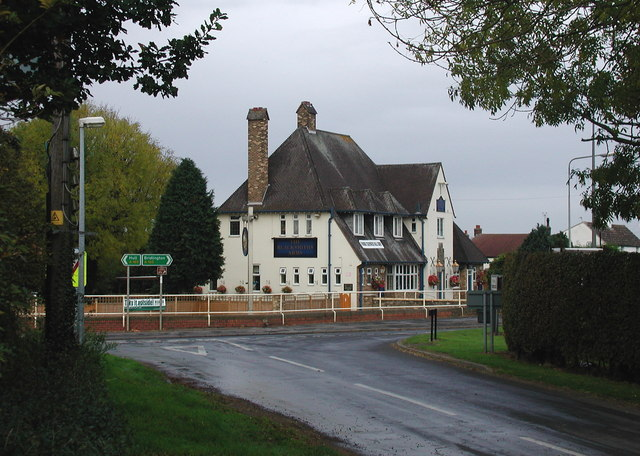
The Blacksmiths Arms

The civil parish is formed by the village of Coniston and the hamlet of Thirtleby. According to the 2011 UK Census, Coniston parish had a population of 319, an increase on the 2001 UK Census figure of 266.

The name Coniston derives from the Old Danish kunung meaning 'king' and the Old English tūn meaning 'settlement'.
