= Meltonby =

Hamlet in the East Riding of Yorkshire, England

Coordinates: 53.962427°N 0.788697°W

- Location within the East Riding of Yorkshire
- OS grid reference: SE795524
  - London: 170 mi (270 km) S
- Civil parish: Yapham
- Unitary authority: East Riding of Yorkshire
- Ceremonial county: East Riding of Yorkshire
- Region: Yorkshire and the Humber
- Country: England
- Sovereign state: United Kingdom
- Post town: YORK
- Postcode district: YO42
- Dialling code: 01759
- Police: Humberside
- Fire: Humberside
- Ambulance: Yorkshire
- UK Parliament: Bridlington and The Wolds

Meltonby is a hamlet in the civil parish of Yapham, in the East Riding of Yorkshire, England. It is situated approximately 2 miles (3.2 km) north of Pocklington. In the Imperial Gazetteer of England and Wales of 1870-72, it had a population of 66.

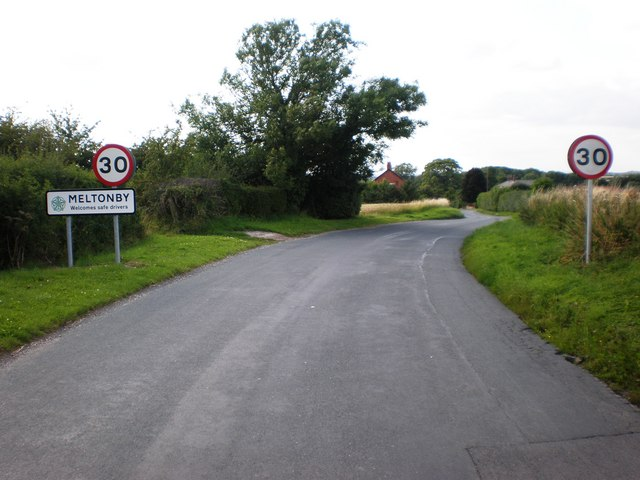
Road into Meltonby

The name Meltonby possibly derives from the Old English middeltūn meaning 'middle settlement', and the Old Norse bȳ meaning 'village'. Another theory derives the name from an Old Norse personal name, possibly Mjolthegn and bȳ.

Meltonby is listed in the Domesday Book as in the Hundred of Warter in the East Riding of Yorkshire. At the time of the survey, the settlement contained thirteen villagers. Five smallholders, four tributaries (rent payers), fifteen burgesses, a priest and a church. There were fifty-three ploughlands, woodland, and three mills. In 1066, Earl Morcar held the lordship, which in 1086 transferred to King William I, who was also Tenant-in-chief.

In 1823, Meltonby was in the parish of Pocklington, and the Wapentake of Harthill. The population at the time was 78, with occupations including six farmers & yeomen.
