= Little Catwick =

Hamlet in the East Riding of Yorkshire, England

Coordinates: 53.886538°N 0.284982°W

- Location within the East Riding of Yorkshire
- OS grid reference: TA128447
  - London: 165 mi (266 km) S
- Civil parish: Catwick
- Unitary authority: East Riding of Yorkshire
- Ceremonial county: East Riding of Yorkshire
- Region: Yorkshire and the Humber
- Country: England
- Sovereign state: United Kingdom
- Post town: BEVERLEY
- Postcode district: HU17
- Dialling code: 01964
- Police: Humberside
- Fire: Humberside
- Ambulance: Yorkshire
- UK Parliament: Beverley and Holderness

Little Catwick is a hamlet in the East Riding of Yorkshire, England. It is situated approximately 7 miles (11 km) north-east of Beverley town centre. It lies 0.5 miles (0.8 km) east of the A165 Leven by-pass.

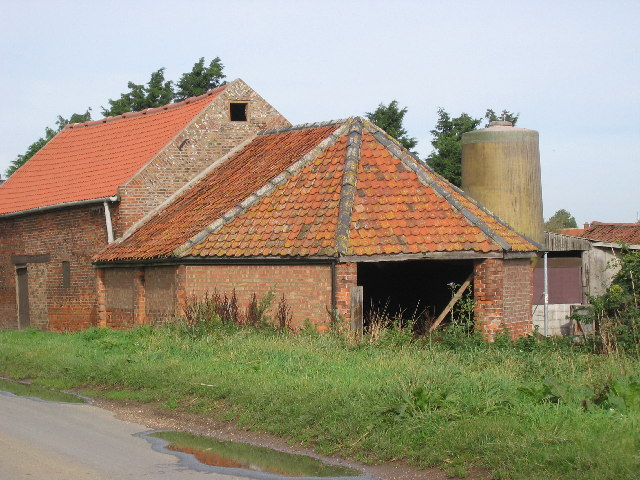
Little Catwick

It forms part of the civil parish of Catwick.
