= Wilsic =

Hamlet in South Yorkshire, England

Coordinates: 53.456°N 1.147°W

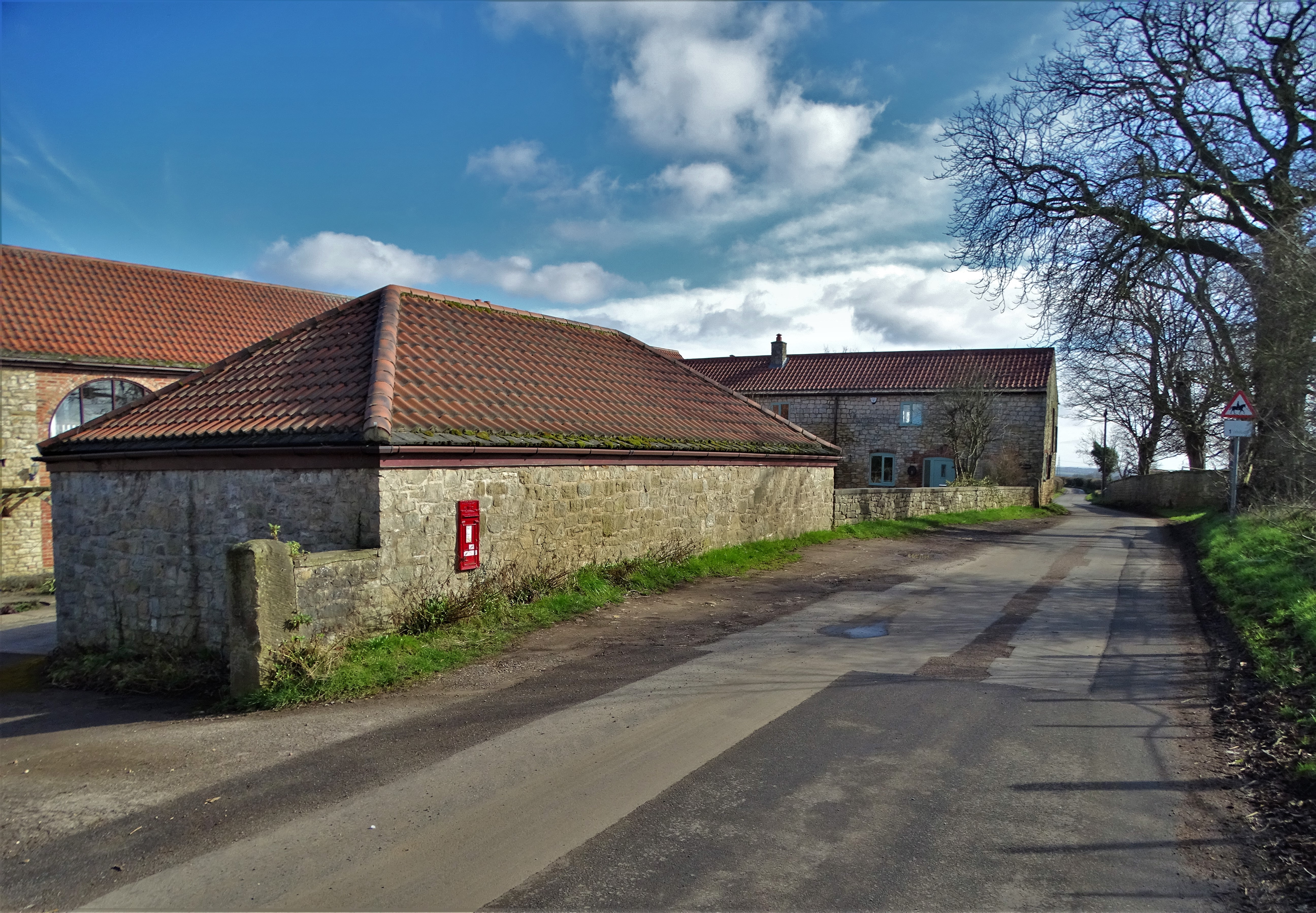
- Farm buildings in Wilsic

- Location within South Yorkshire
- Civil parish: Stainton
- Metropolitan borough: Doncaster
- Metropolitan county: South Yorkshire
- Region: Yorkshire and the Humber
- Country: England
- Sovereign state: United Kingdom
- Post town: DONCASTER
- Postcode district: DN11
- Dialling code: 01709
- Police: South Yorkshire
- Fire: South Yorkshire
- Ambulance: Yorkshire
- UK Parliament: Doncaster Central

Wilsic is a hamlet in the civil parish of Stainton, in the Doncaster district, in South Yorkshire, England, south of Doncaster. The A1(M) passes to the east of the hamlet.

The settlement was mentioned in the 1086 Domesday Book, when it contained 3 households under the ownership of William de Warenne.

== Wilsic Hall ==
Wilsic Hall was constructed c. 1750 for Sir Francis Tofield. The building was grade II listed on 5 June 1968. The hall is currently used as a special needs school.
