= Waplington =

Hamlet in the East Riding of Yorkshire, England

Coordinates: 53.910064°N 0.819746°W

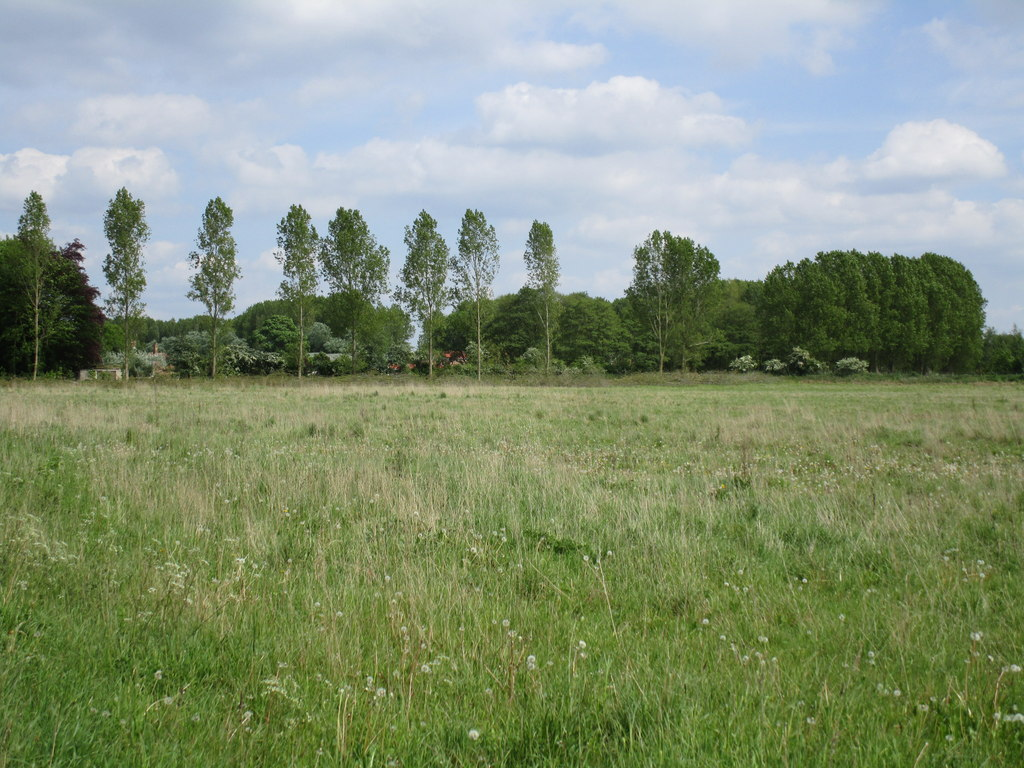
- View towards Waplington

- Location within the East Riding of Yorkshire
- OS grid reference: SE776466
- Civil parish: Allerthorpe
- Unitary authority: East Riding of Yorkshire
- Ceremonial county: East Riding of Yorkshire
- Region: Yorkshire and the Humber
- Country: England
- Sovereign state: United Kingdom
- Post town: YORK
- Postcode district: YO42
- Dialling code: 01759
- Police: Humberside
- Fire: Humberside
- Ambulance: Yorkshire
- UK Parliament: Goole and Pocklington

Waplington is a hamlet in the civil parish of Allerthorpe, in the East Riding of Yorkshire, England. It is situated approximately 2 miles (3.2 km) south-west of the market town of Pocklington.

Waplington was formerly a township in the parish of Allerthorpe, in 1866 Waplington became a separate civil parish, on 1 April 1935 the parish was abolished and merged with Allerthorpe. In 1931 the parish had a population of 49.

The name Waplington probably derives from the Old English Wæppelaingtūn meaning 'settlement connected with Wæppela'. Alternatively, it may derive from wapolingtūn meaning 'settlement at the pool/marshy place'.
