= Clayton, South Yorkshire =

Village in South Yorkshire, England

Coordinates: 53.565°N 1.317°W

Clayton
- Village
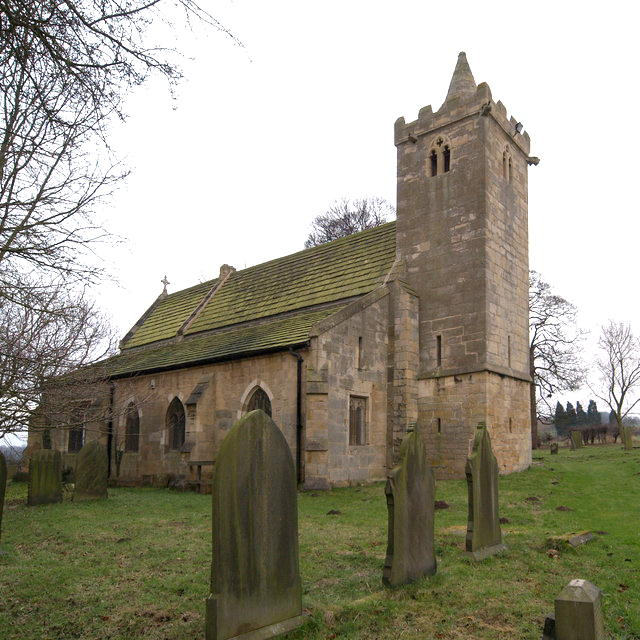
- All Saints Church

- Location within City of Doncaster Location within South Yorkshire
- Population: 230 (2011 census)
- OS grid reference: SE452078
- Civil parish: Clayton with Frickley
- Metropolitan borough: City of Doncaster
- Metropolitan county: South Yorkshire
- Region: Yorkshire and the Humber
- Country: England
- Sovereign state: United Kingdom
- Post town: DONCASTER
- Postcode district: DN5
- Dialling code: 01977
- Police: South Yorkshire
- Fire: South Yorkshire
- Ambulance: Yorkshire

Clayton is a village in the west of the City of Doncaster, South Yorkshire, England, on the border with West Yorkshire. It lies to the north of Thurnscoe at an elevation of around 80 metres above sea level.

Together with Frickley, it makes up the civil parish of Clayton with Frickley, which at the 2001 census had a population of 208, increasing to 230 at the 2011 Census.

The Parish Church of All Saints dates back to the 12th century and is a Grade II* listed building.

== See also ==
- Listed buildings in Clayton with Frickley
