= Frickley =

Village in South Yorkshire, England

Coordinates: 53.569°N 1.299°W

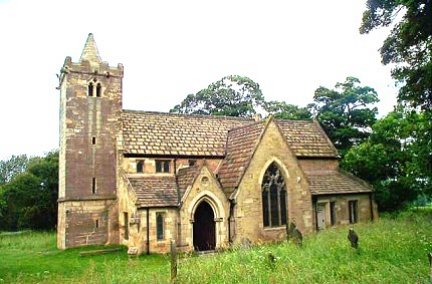
- All Saints' Church, Frickley

- Location within South Yorkshire
- OS grid reference: SE464082
- Civil parish: Clayton with Frickley
- Metropolitan borough: Doncaster
- Metropolitan county: South Yorkshire
- Region: Yorkshire and the Humber
- Country: England
- Sovereign state: United Kingdom
- Post town: Doncaster
- Postcode district: DN5
- Dialling code: 01977
- Police: South Yorkshire
- Fire: South Yorkshire
- Ambulance: Yorkshire

Frickley is a village in the Metropolitan Borough of Doncaster, South Yorkshire, England in the civil parish of Clayton with Frickley. It lies close to the border with West Yorkshire.

The name Frickley derives from the Old English Fricalēah meaning 'Frica's wood or clearing'.

== Local landmarks ==
=== All Saints Church ===
Frickley All Saints Church is situated about 1.5 miles (2.4 km) from the main village in the middle of a field, accessed by a lane from the road. The reason for this unusual site stems back to plague times, when Frickley village was effectively burnt to the ground and re-sited on the top of the hill following a plague epidemic. The only proof that the village was ever anywhere else is the oddly sited church. Being the only stone building of the time, it was left where it was, and survives to this day as an active place of worship in the Parish of Bilham. The church has some interesting 18th-19th century graves including that for someone "cruelly murdered on the highway between Clayton and Frickley". The church is a small ancient structure, with a tower, in the interior are some cylindrical columns, and between the nave and chancel is a handsome Norman arch. It is a Grade II* listed building.

=== Frickley Colliery ===
Frickley Colliery (majoritively located in the neighbouring town of South Elmsall) was the starting point of the mining strikes of the 1980s. The colliery was closed in 1993, and all that remains now is a grass hill clearly visible from the village as you look towards South Elmsall, which has been landscaped into the large Frickley Country Park.

=== Frickley Hall ===
The Grade II listed Frickley Hall is a grand house in the village, which is the location of the Frickley Horse Trials events.

== Sport ==
The village lends its name to the nearby football team Frickley Athletic and is home to the Frickley Horse Trials.

== Music ==
Located in neighbouring South Elmsall is the Carlton Main Frickley Colliery Brass Band, a traditional brass band, with strong ties to the former colliery.

== See also ==
- Listed buildings in Clayton with Frickley
- Doncaster
- Clayton
