= Welham, North Yorkshire =

Place in North Yorkshire, England

Coordinates: 54.117°N 0.805°W

Welham is a place in the civil parish of Norton-on-Derwent, in North Yorkshire, England. It is situated south west of Norton.

The Malton & Norton Golf Club is located north of the locality. Welham Hall is the main residence.

== History ==
In the Domesday Book, Welham in the hundred of Scard, is mentioned as being held in 1066 by Edeva, wife of Topi, and in 1086 by Ranulph de Mortimer.
