= Catwick =

Village and civil parish in the East Riding of Yorkshire, England

Coordinates: 53°53′35″N 0°16′52″W

- Location within the East Riding of Yorkshire
- Population: 240 (2011 census)
- OS grid reference: TA131454
  - London: 165 mi (266 km) S
- Civil parish: Catwick
- Unitary authority: East Riding of Yorkshire
- Ceremonial county: East Riding of Yorkshire
- Region: Yorkshire and the Humber
- Country: England
- Sovereign state: United Kingdom
- Post town: BEVERLEY
- Postcode district: HU17
- Dialling code: 01964
- Police: Humberside
- Fire: Humberside
- Ambulance: Yorkshire
- UK Parliament: Beverley and Holderness

Catwick is a village and civil parish in the East Riding of Yorkshire, England. It is situated approximately 7.5 miles (12 km) north-east of Beverley town centre and 5 miles (8 km) west of Hornsea town centre. It lies on the A1035 road (formerly B1244) from Leven to Hornsea.

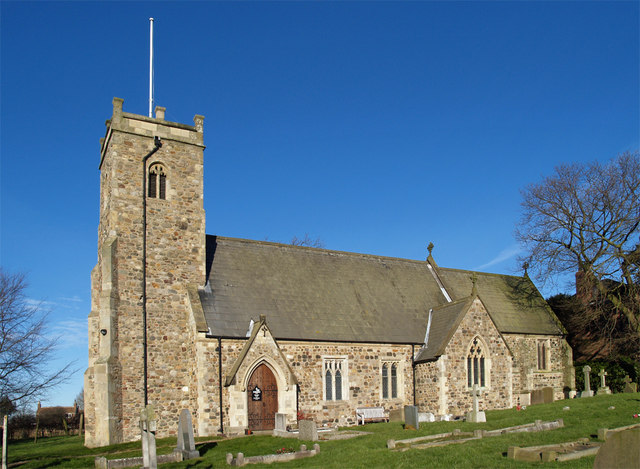
Church of St Michael

The civil parish is formed by the village of Catwick and the hamlet of Little Catwick. According to the 2011 UK census, Catwick parish had a population of 240, an increase on the 2001 UK census figure of 215.

The name Catwick derives from the Old English Cattawīc meaning 'Catta's trading settlement'.

Catwick is one of only five Thankful Villages in Yorkshire – those rare places that suffered no fatalities during the First World War. It is also considered "doubly thankful", in that it lost no service personnel during the Second World War. The village is featured on Darren Hayman's album, Thankful Villages Volume 3.

St Michael's Church, Catwick was designated a Grade II* listed building in 1966 and is now recorded in the National Heritage List for England, maintained by Historic England.

In 1823 Catwick was in the Wapentake and Liberty of Holderness. The living of the ecclesiastical parish and St Michael's Church was under the patronage of the King. Population at the time was 190. Occupations included five farmers and a corn miller. Three yeomen resided in the village. A carrier operated between Catwick and Hull and Beverley once a week.

== See also ==
- Listed buildings in Catwick
