= Bolton, East Riding of Yorkshire =

Village in the East Riding of Yorkshire, England

Coordinates: 53.961015°N 0.824831°W

Bolton
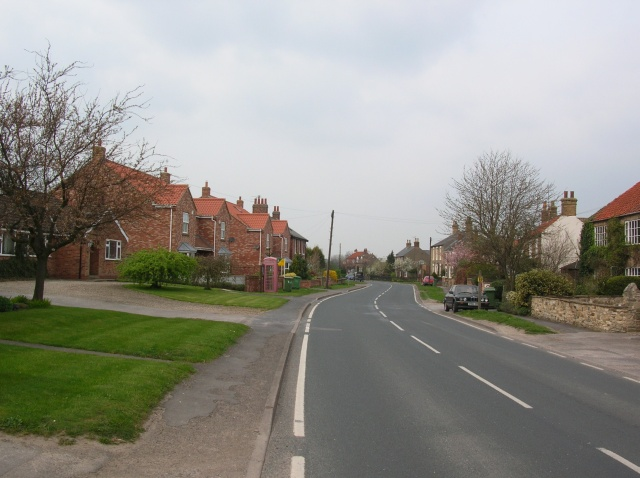
- Main street, Bolton

- Location within the East Riding of Yorkshire
- OS grid reference: SE772522
  - London: 170 mi (270 km) S
- Civil parish: Fangfoss
- Unitary authority: East Riding of Yorkshire
- Ceremonial county: East Riding of Yorkshire
- Region: Yorkshire and the Humber
- Country: England
- Sovereign state: United Kingdom
- Post town: YORK
- Postcode district: YO41
- Dialling code: 01759
- Police: Humberside
- Fire: Humberside
- Ambulance: Yorkshire
- UK Parliament: Bridlington and The Wolds

Bolton is a village and former civil parish, now in the parish of Fangfoss, in the East Riding of Yorkshire, England. It is situated approximately 10 miles (16 km) to the east of the city of York and 3 miles (5 km) north-west of the town of Pocklington. In 1931 the parish had a population of 130. Bolton was formerly a township in the parish of Bishop Wilton, from 1866 Bolton was a civil parish in its own right, on 1 April 1935 the parish was abolished and merged with Fangfoss, part also went to form Bishop Wilton.

The name Bolton derives from the Old English bōðltūn meaning 'a collection of buildings'.

Bolton has an active local history society.
