= Dalton Gates =

Hamlet in North Yorkshire, England

Coordinates: 54.4395°N 1.551°W

- Location within North Yorkshire
- Population: 60
- OS grid reference: NZ293050
- Unitary authority: North Yorkshire
- Ceremonial county: North Yorkshire
- Region: Yorkshire and the Humber
- Country: England
- Sovereign state: United Kingdom
- Post town: DARLINGTON
- Postcode district: DL2
- Dialling code: 01325
- Police: North Yorkshire
- Fire: North Yorkshire
- Ambulance: Yorkshire
- UK Parliament: Richmond and Northallerton

Dalton Gates is a hamlet in the county of North Yorkshire, England.

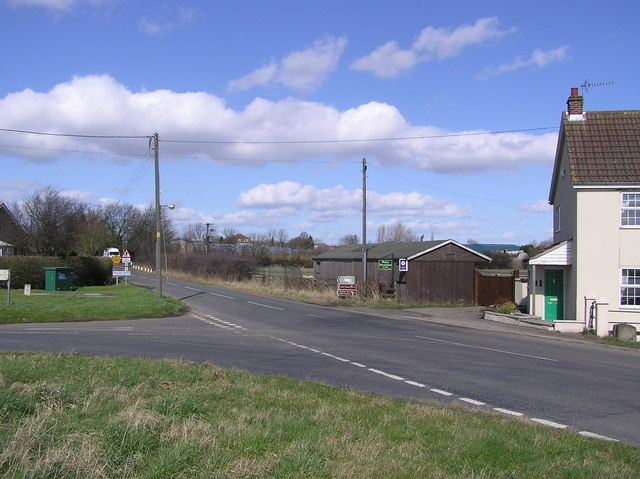
The site of the former level crossing at Dalton Gates

The hamlet was built up around the now disused railway station that formed part of the disbanded Richmond Line. The station building is now a residential property.

The placename Dalton comes from Old English and means settlement in the dale; here it refers to the nearby Dalton-on-Tees and Gates refers to the gates that were used on the railway level crossing. There is evidence that prior to the arrival of the railway the area was known as Straggleton.

From 1974 to 2023 it was part of the district of Richmondshire, it is now administered by the unitary North Yorkshire Council.

Dalton Gates is now served by the number 72 bus between Darlington and Northallerton.

Croft Circuit is situated about 0.5 miles (0.8 km) from Dalton Gates; it is one of the most important motor racing venues in the UK.

Paddock Farm Water Gardens is situated in Dalton Gates.
