= Thirtleby =

Hamlet in the East Riding of Yorkshire, England

Coordinates: 53.795900°N 0.215347°W

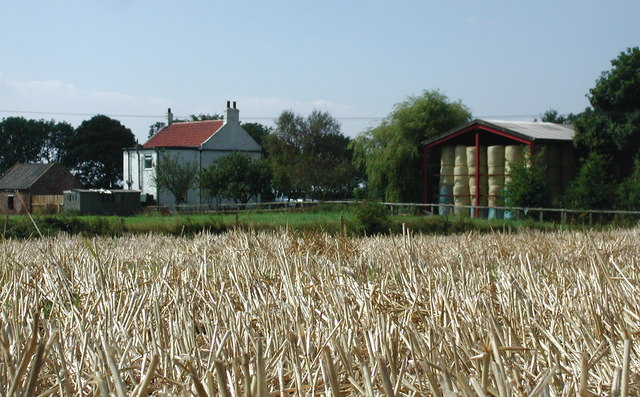
- White House Farm, Thirtleby

- Location within the East Riding of Yorkshire
- OS grid reference: TA176347
- Civil parish: Coniston
- Unitary authority: East Riding of Yorkshire
- Ceremonial county: East Riding of Yorkshire
- Region: Yorkshire and the Humber
- Country: England
- Sovereign state: United Kingdom
- Post town: HULL
- Postcode district: HU11
- Dialling code: 01964
- Police: Humberside
- Fire: Humberside
- Ambulance: Yorkshire
- UK Parliament: Beverley and Holderness

Thirtleby is a hamlet in the civil parish of Coniston, in the East Riding of Yorkshire, England. It is situated approximately 6 miles (9.7 km) north-east of Hull city centre and 1 mile (1.6 km) west of the village of Sproatley.

Thirtleby was formerly a township in the parish of Swine, in 1866 Thirtleby became a separate civil parish, on 1 April 1935 the parish was abolished and merged with Coniston. In 1931 the parish had a population of 55.

The name Thirtleby derives from the Old Norse Thorkelbȳ meaning 'Thorkel's village'.
