= Allerthorpe =

Village and civil parish in the East Riding of Yorkshire, England

Coordinates: 53.916821°N 0.807680°W

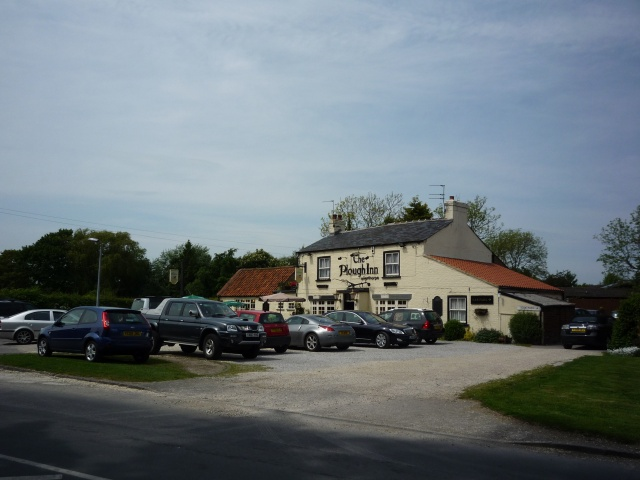
- The Plough Inn

- Location within the East Riding of Yorkshire
- Population: 220 (2011 census)
- OS grid reference: SE784474
  - London: 170 mi (270 km) S
- Civil parish: Allerthorpe
- Unitary authority: East Riding of Yorkshire
- Ceremonial county: East Riding of Yorkshire
- Region: Yorkshire and the Humber
- Country: England
- Sovereign state: United Kingdom
- Post town: YORK
- Postcode district: YO42
- Dialling code: 01759
- Police: Humberside
- Fire: Humberside
- Ambulance: Yorkshire
- UK Parliament: Goole and Pocklington

Allerthorpe is a village and civil parish in the East Riding of Yorkshire, England. It is situated approximately 1.5 miles (2.4 km) south-west from the town of Pocklington.

The civil parish is formed by the village of Allerthorpe and the hamlet of Waplington. According to the 2011 UK census, Allerthorpe parish had a population of 220, a slight reduction from the 2001 UK census figure of 223. The parish covers an area of 969.217 hectares (2,394.99 acres).

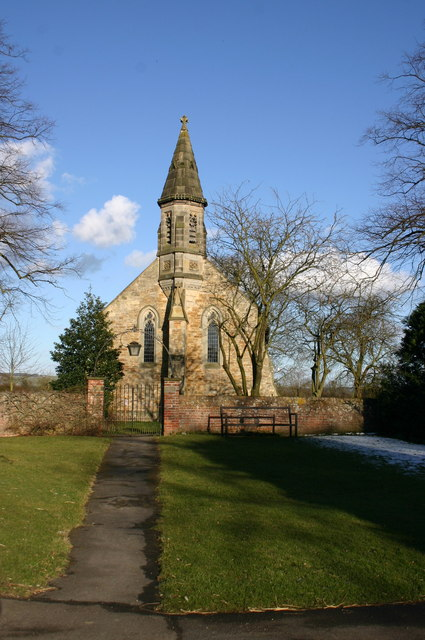
St Botolph's Church, Allerthorpe

The name Allerthorpe derives from either an Old English or Old Norse personal name, perhaps Aelfweard or Alfvarthr, and the Old Norse þorp meaning 'secondary settlement'.

Allerthorpe has a public house, The Plough Inn, an 18-hole golf course and a lake used for water sports and fishing. Allerthorpe Common, to the west of the village, has a nature reserve.

St Botolph's Church, Allerthorpe is the village's Victorian Grade II listed Anglican parish church.

From the mediaeval era until the 19th century Allerthorpe was part of Harthill Wapentake. Between 1894 and 1974 it was a part of the Pocklington Rural District, in the East Riding of Yorkshire. Between 1974 and 1996 it was part of the Borough of North Wolds (later Borough of East Yorkshire), in the county of Humberside.

The K6 telephone box on Main Street is Grade II listed.

Thomas Cooke, the machinist and optical instrument maker, was born here. There is a memorial stone to him near the church gate and a blue plaque was unveiled in the village hall in 2009.

William Dewsbury the Quaker minister was born in the village.

== See also ==
- Listed buildings in Allerthorpe
