= Borrowby, east North Yorkshire =

Village and civil parish in North Yorkshire, England

Coordinates: 54.530400°N 0.809900°W

Borrowby
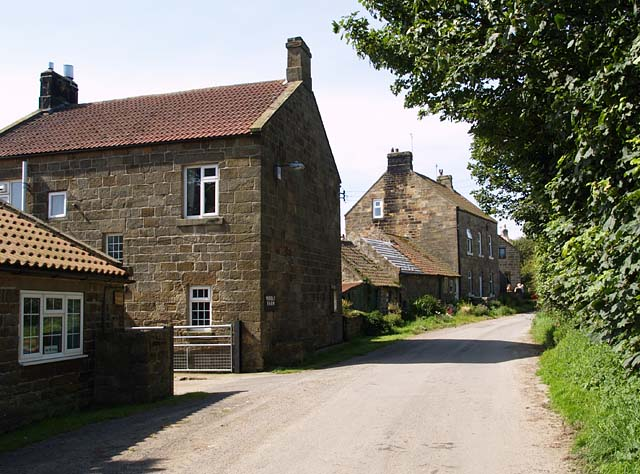

- Location within North Yorkshire
- Population: 50 (2014)
- OS grid reference: NZ771156
  - London: 210 mi (340 km) S
- Civil parish: Borrowby
- Unitary authority: North Yorkshire
- Ceremonial county: North Yorkshire
- Region: Yorkshire and the Humber
- Country: England
- Sovereign state: United Kingdom
- Post town: SALTBURN-BY-THE-SEA
- Postcode district: TS13
- Police: North Yorkshire
- Fire: North Yorkshire
- Ambulance: Yorkshire
- UK Parliament: Scarborough and Whitby

Borrowby is a village and civil parish in the county of North Yorkshire, England. The village is situated in the North York Moors National Park, inland but near the coast, between Whitby and Saltburn-by-the-Sea. The population of the civil parish was estimated at 50 in 2014. According to the 2001 UK census, Borrowby parish had a population of 56.

From 1974 to 2023 it was part of the Borough of Scarborough, it is now administered by the unitary North Yorkshire Council.

The name Borrowby derives from the Old English berg meaning 'tumulus' and the Old Norse bȳ meaning 'village'.

== See also ==
- Listed buildings in Borrowby, east North Yorkshire
