= Scagglethorpe =

Village and civil parish in North Yorkshire, England

Coordinates: 54.142048°N 0.722764°W

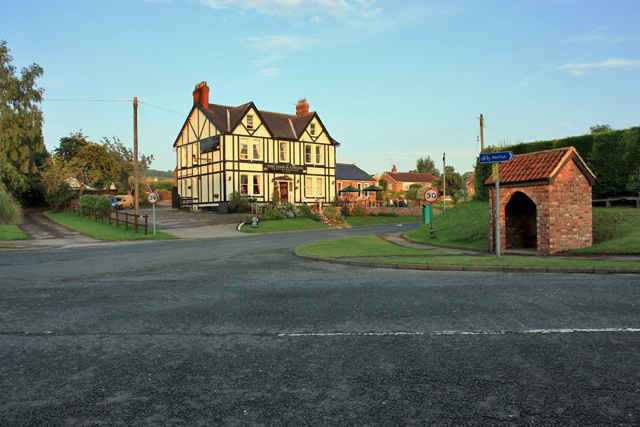
- Scagglethorpe Crossing

- Location within North Yorkshire
- Population: 220 (2011 census)
- OS grid reference: SE835725
  - London: 188 mi (303 km) south
- Civil parish: Scagglethorpe
- Unitary authority: North Yorkshire
- Ceremonial county: North Yorkshire
- Region: Yorkshire and the Humber
- Country: England
- Sovereign state: United Kingdom
- Post town: MALTON
- Postcode district: YO17
- Police: North Yorkshire
- Fire: North Yorkshire
- Ambulance: Yorkshire
- UK Parliament: Thirsk and Malton

Scagglethorpe is a village and civil parish in the Ryedale district of North Yorkshire, England. It is situated just south from the A64 road, 3 miles (5 km) east from Malton and almost midway between York and Scarborough.

Until 1974 the village lay in the historic county boundaries of the East Riding of Yorkshire. From 1974 to 2023 it was part of the Ryedale district. It is now administered by North Yorkshire Council.

To the east of Bull Piece Lane, 700 yards (640 m) south from the village, is evidence of Iron Age or Roman ditches and rectilinear enclosures, and within the village have been found fragments of Roman pottery from the 1st century CE. On Charlton Place is the site of a medieval manor house. Just south from the A64, 500 yards (457 m) west from the village, have been found Roman coins and a Celtic brooch.

In the 1086 Domesday Book Scagglethorpe is written as "Scachetorp". The manor, in the East Riding Hundred of Scard, comprised one household. Lordship of the manor had passed to Robert, Count of Mortain, who also became Tenant-in-chief.

Scagglethorpe is derived from the Viking word "Schachetorp", meaning hamlet of a man called Skakull or Skakli.

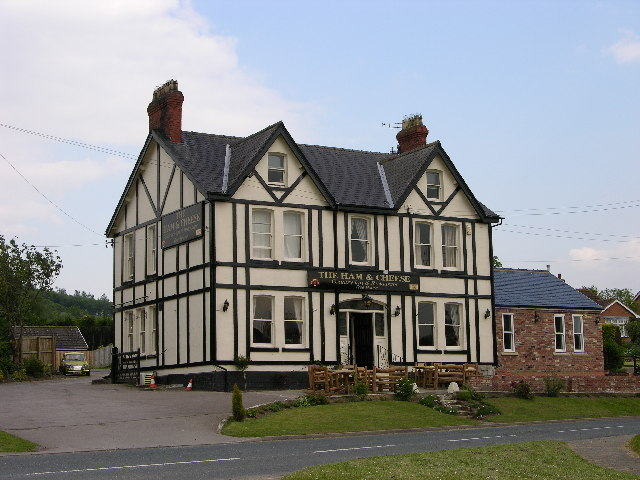
The Ham and Cheese Inn

On Village Street is Scagglethorpe Manor, a Grade II listed 17th-century farmhouse with an early-19th-century wing. Pevsner also notes a c. 1816 Gothic-style Wesleyan Methodist chapel and a cottage with a Gothic porch. The chapel is part of the Malton Methodist Circuit.

Village facilities include a public house, playing field and a village hall.
