= Fangfoss =

Village in the East Riding of Yorkshire, England

Coordinates: 53°58′10″N 0°50′04″W

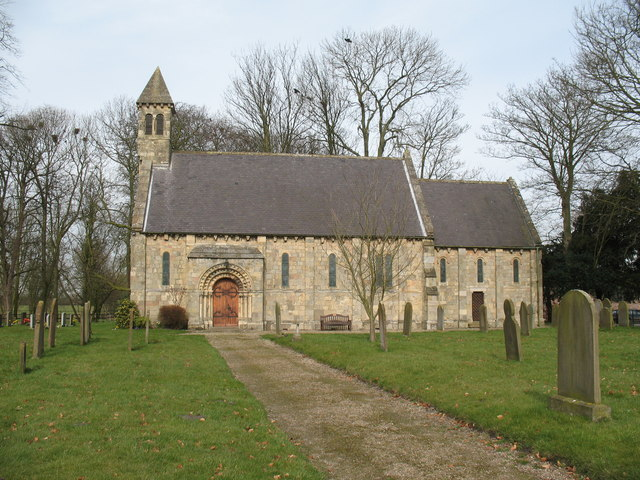
- Saint Martins Church, Fangfoss

- Location within the East Riding of Yorkshire
- Population: 581 (2011 census)
- OS grid reference: SE765532
  - London: 170 mi (270 km) S
- Civil parish: Fangfoss
- Unitary authority: East Riding of Yorkshire
- Ceremonial county: East Riding of Yorkshire
- Region: Yorkshire and the Humber
- Country: England
- Sovereign state: United Kingdom
- Post town: YORK
- Postcode district: YO41
- Dialling code: 01759
- Police: Humberside
- Fire: Humberside
- Ambulance: Yorkshire
- UK Parliament: Bridlington and The Wolds

Fangfoss is a village and civil parish in the East Riding of Yorkshire, England. It is situated approximately 11 miles (18 km) to the east of the city of York and 3.5 miles (6 km) north-west of the town of Pocklington. The parish includes Bolton. The civil parish is called "Fangfoss" and its parish council is called "Fangfoss with Bolton Parish Council" after Bolton parish was abolished on 1 April 1935 and merged with Fangfoss. The parish covers an area of 900.98 hectares (2,226.4 acres). In 2011 it had a population of 581, a decrease on the 2001 UK census figure of 602.

In 1823 Fangfoss was listed as the parish of 'Fangfoss-with-Spittle'. The village was in the Wapentake of Harthill. Population was 154, with occupations including twelve farmers, a shopkeeper, a shoemaker, and a schoolmaster. The landlord of The Carpenter's public house was also a village carpenter. The village chapel was in the charge of the vicar of Barnby-upon-the-Moor, and under the patronage of the Dean of York.

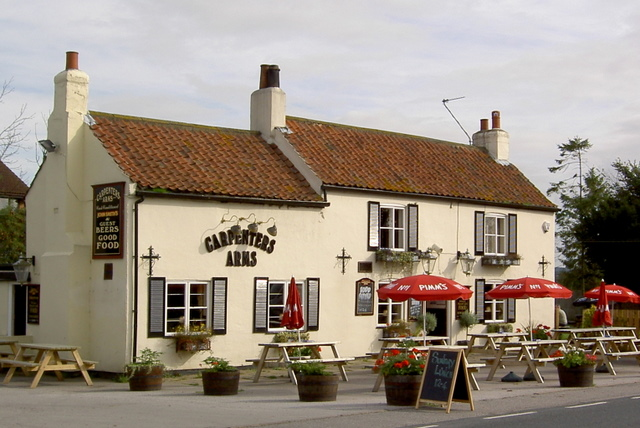
The Carpenters Arms

The name Fangfoss probably derives from the Old Norse fang meaning 'fishing' and the Old English foss meaning 'ditch'. Alternatively, the first element could perhaps be the Old English personal name Fangulf.

St Martin's Church, Fangfoss was designated a Grade II* listed building in January 1967 and is now recorded in the National Heritage List for England, maintained by Historic England.

Fangfoss Hall was designated a Grade II* listed building in 1967 and is now recorded in the National Heritage List for England, maintained by Historic England.

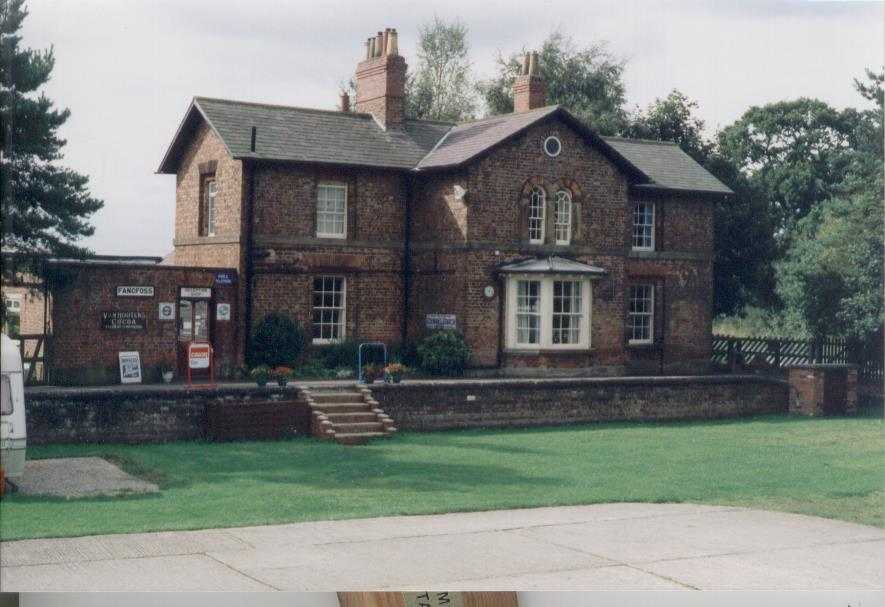
Fangfoss railway station old site

Fangfoss was served by Fangfoss railway station on the York to Beverley Line between 1847 and 1959. In 1987 the station was given a Grade II listed building status.

In addition to the parish church, Fangfoss has a primary school and pub called The Carpenters Arms. A village park was created in 2002 to mark the Queen's Golden Jubilee and is called Jubilee Park.

Fangfoss hosts an annual arts festival called Fangfest – Fangfoss Festival of Practical Arts, which takes place every September and is a celebration of local traditional arts and crafts.

== See also ==
- Listed buildings in Fangfoss
