= Middleton-on-Wharfe =

Hamlet and civil parish in North Yorkshire, England

Coordinates: 53.939533°N 1.814664°W

Middleton
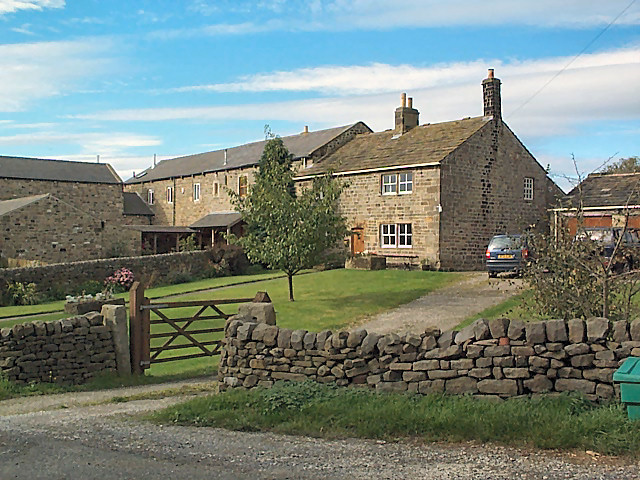
- Converted farmhouses in Middleton

- Location within North Yorkshire
- Population: 215 (Including Denton. 2011 census)
- OS grid reference: SE12264928
- Civil parish: Middleton
- Unitary authority: North Yorkshire
- Ceremonial county: North Yorkshire
- Region: Yorkshire and the Humber
- Country: England
- Sovereign state: United Kingdom
- Post town: IlKLEY
- Postcode district: LS29
- Police: North Yorkshire
- Fire: North Yorkshire
- Ambulance: Yorkshire

Middleton is a hamlet and civil parish in the county of North Yorkshire, England. It is on the border with West Yorkshire and 1 mile north of the town centre of Ilkley, West Yorkshire and is continuous with the Middleton suburb of the town (the area lying north of the River Wharfe). From 1974 to 2023 it was part of the Borough of Harrogate, it is now administered by the unitary North Yorkshire Council.

Westville House School is the closest school, on the outskirts of Ilkley.

== See also ==
- Listed buildings in Middleton-on-Wharfe
