= Swinton, Ryedale =

Village and civil parish in North Yorkshire, England

Coordinates: 54.14954°N 0.83936°W

Swinton
- Location within North Yorkshire
- Population: 608 (2011 census)
- OS grid reference: SE759732
- Civil parish: Swinton
- Unitary authority: North Yorkshire
- Ceremonial county: North Yorkshire
- Region: Yorkshire and the Humber
- Country: England
- Sovereign state: United Kingdom
- Post town: MALTON
- Postcode district: YO17
- Police: North Yorkshire
- Fire: North Yorkshire
- Ambulance: Yorkshire
- UK Parliament: Thirsk and Malton

Swinton is a village and civil parish in North Yorkshire, England. It is about 2 miles (3.2 km) west of Malton on the B1257 road, and is on the edge of the Howardian Hills AONB to the immediate north. The village appears in the Domesday Book as 'Swintune' which is derived from 'pig farm'.

== Population ==
The parish had 467 residents at the 2001 census, which had risen to 608 by the time of the 2011 census. By 2015, North Yorkshire County Council had estimated the population to have been 630.

== Administration ==
The village was part of the Ryedale district between 1974 and 2023. It is now administered by North Yorkshire Council.

== See also ==
- Listed buildings in Swinton, Ryedale
