= Crowdon =

Village in North Yorkshire, England

Coordinates: 54°21′48″N 0°28′12″W

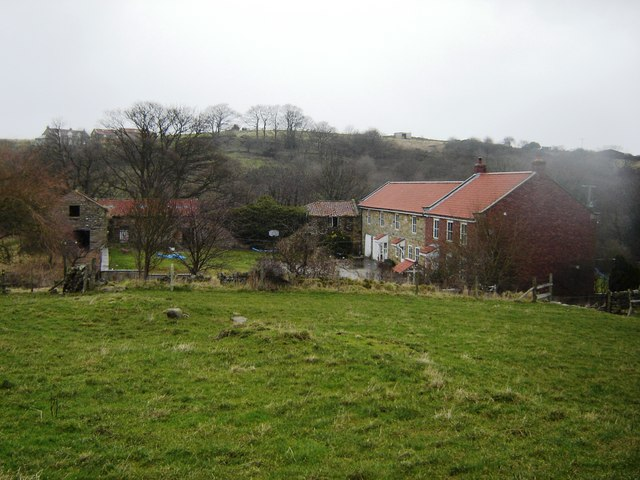
Calfthwaite Farm, Crowdon

Crowdon is a village in the county of North Yorkshire, England.

From 1974 to 2023 it was part of the Borough of Scarborough, it is now administered by the unitary North Yorkshire Council.
