= Stainton, South Yorkshire =

Village and civil parish in South Yorkshire, England

Coordinates: 53.4362°N 1.17138°W

Stainton
- Location within South Yorkshire
- Population: 271 (2011)
- OS grid reference: SK551935
  - London: 140 mi (230 km) S
- Civil parish: Stainton
- Metropolitan borough: Doncaster
- Metropolitan county: South Yorkshire
- Region: Yorkshire and the Humber
- Country: England
- Sovereign state: United Kingdom
- Post town: ROTHERHAM
- Postcode district: S66
- Dialling code: 01709
- Police: South Yorkshire
- Fire: South Yorkshire
- Ambulance: Yorkshire
- UK Parliament: Doncaster Central

Stainton is a village and civil parish in the Metropolitan Borough of Doncaster in South Yorkshire, England.

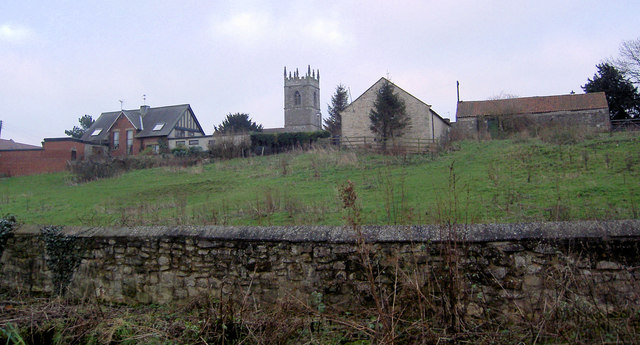
St. Winifred's Church from Lime Kiln Lane

The parish has a population of 269, increasing marginally to 271 at the 2011 Census. and is historically part of the West Riding of Yorkshire.

The name Stainton derives from the Old Norse steinn meaning 'stone', and the Old English tūn meaning 'settlement'.

Stainton is recorded in the 1086 Domesday Book. Stainton grew in the 19th century, providing homes for miners at Maltby.

Stainton ecclesiastical parish is within the Diocese of Sheffield. The parish church of St. Winifred, a Grade II* listed building, dates from the 12th century.

The current Stainton lord of the manor (as of 2015), is the 13th Earl of Scarbrough. The cricketer Fred Trueman was born at Scotch Springs in Stainton.

== See also ==
- Listed buildings in Stainton, South Yorkshire
