= Middleton, Cowling =

Hamlet in North Yorkshire, England

Coordinates: 53.884660°N 2.051000°W

Middleton
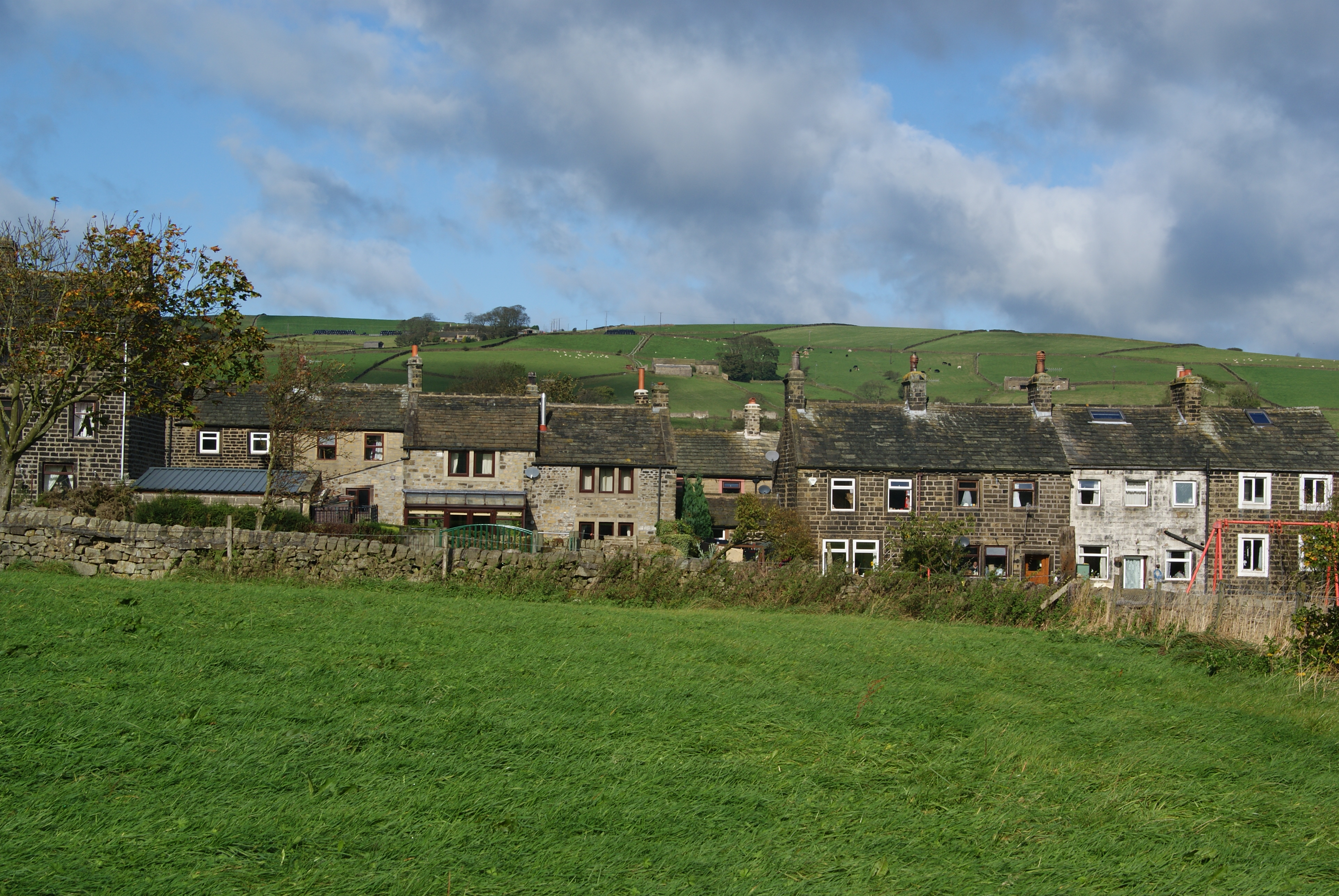
- Cottages at Middleton

- Location within North Yorkshire
- OS grid reference: SD967431
- Civil parish: Cowling
- Unitary authority: North Yorkshire
- Ceremonial county: North Yorkshire
- Region: Yorkshire and the Humber
- Country: England
- Sovereign state: United Kingdom
- Post town: KEIGHLEY
- Postcode district: BD22
- Police: North Yorkshire
- Fire: North Yorkshire
- Ambulance: Yorkshire

Middleton is a hamlet in the county of North Yorkshire, England, part of the civil parish of Cowling. It is near the border with West Yorkshire located west of Keighley, West Yorkshire and consists of only one row of stone-built cottages.

Until 1974 it was part of the West Riding of Yorkshire. From 1974 to 2023 it was part of the Craven District, it is now administered by the unitary North Yorkshire Council.
