= Kirkhamgate =

Village in West Yorkshire, England

Coordinates: 53.6971°N 1.5471°W

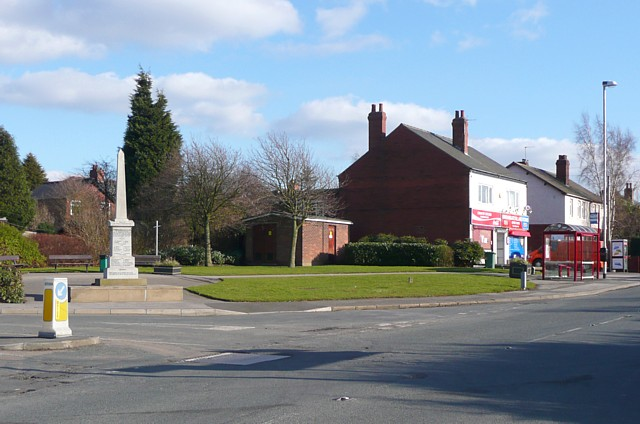

- Location within West Yorkshire
- OS grid reference: SE300224
- Metropolitan borough: City of Wakefield
- Metropolitan county: West Yorkshire
- Region: Yorkshire and the Humber
- Country: England
- Sovereign state: United Kingdom
- Post town: WAKEFIELD
- Postcode district: WF2
- Police: West Yorkshire
- Fire: West Yorkshire
- Ambulance: Yorkshire
- UK Parliament: Wakefield and Rothwell

Kirkhamgate is a village in the Wakefield district, in West Yorkshire, England. It originated as a hamlet in the Alverthorpe township in the parish of Wakefield in the West Riding of Yorkshire.

== Governance ==
Alverthorpe civil parish was formed on 31 December 1894 from part of Alverthorpe with Thornes in Wakefield Rural District. On 1 April 1916 the parish was renamed Kirkhamgate. In 1931 the parish had a population of 1,320. On 1 April 1937 the parish was abolished and merged with Stanley. It has been part of the Wakefield district since 1974.

== Geography ==
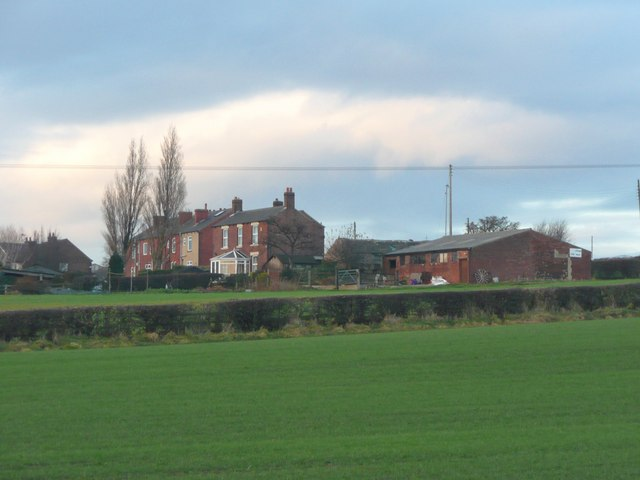
Houses and farm buildings in Kirkhamgate

At its western end, Kirkhamgate is situated on rising ground at the junction of Brandy Carr Road with the Wakefield to Batley road. Brandy Carr Road crosses the Alverthorpe Beck, flowing north to south, at Beck Bottom, and continues past fields, housing and Brandy Carr Nurseries towards the A650 Wakefield to Bradford Road at its eastern end. The M1 motorway passes north and west and is accessed at Junction 41. Wakefield is to the southeast and Wrenthorpe is to the east, where the boundary is the Carr Gate Beck.

Kirkhamgate is primarily a residential village surrounded by farmland that is part of the Rhubarb Triangle. Brandy Carr Nurseries, specialises in rhubarb and liquorice plants.

== Events and facilities ==
Kirkhamgate holds an annual scarecrow festival in September.

Lindale Methodist Church is on Brandy Carr Road. The community centre is next to the church and the Junior and Infant school is opposite. Weekly Women's Institute meetings take place in the church.
