= Bellasize =

Hamlet in the East Riding of Yorkshire, England

Coordinates: 53.740809°N 0.748682°W

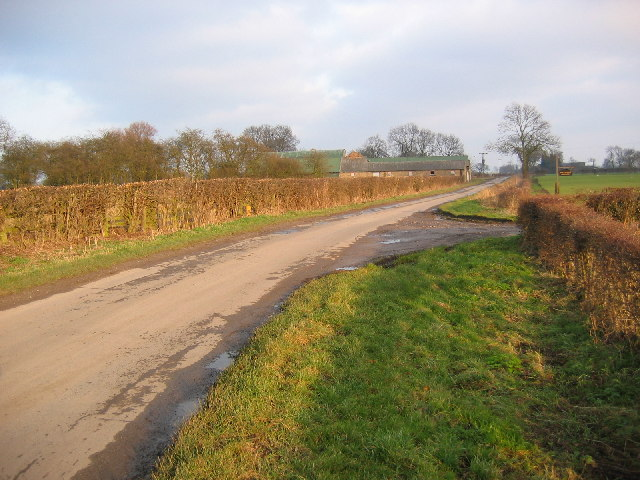

- Location within the East Riding of Yorkshire
- OS grid reference: SE821278
  - London: 155 mi (249 km) S
- Civil parish: Blacktoft
- Unitary authority: East Riding of Yorkshire
- Ceremonial county: East Riding of Yorkshire
- Region: Yorkshire and the Humber
- Country: England
- Sovereign state: United Kingdom
- Post town: GOOLE
- Postcode district: DN14
- Dialling code: 01430
- Police: Humberside
- Fire: Humberside
- Ambulance: Yorkshire
- UK Parliament: Goole and Pocklington

Bellasize is a hamlet in the civil parish of Blacktoft, in the East Riding of Yorkshire, England. It is situated approximately 5 miles (8 km) east of the market town of Howden.

== History ==
The name of the hamlet derives from the French meaning beautiful seat (belle + assis, belasis, belasyse), and has the same derivation as Belsize. Historically in the wapentake and liberty of Howdenshire. Bellasize was formerly a township in the parish of Eastrington, from 1866 Bellasize was a civil parish in its own right, on 1 April 1935 the parish was abolished and merged with Blacktoft, Eastrington and Laxton, part also went to form Gilberdyke. In 1931 the parish had a population of 122.

=== RAF Bellasize ===
Fields to the south of the village were used by the Royal Air Force (and the Royal Flying Corps) as RAF Bellasize between 1916 and 1919, and 1939–1945. During the First World War, the site was used by No.s 31 and 76 Squadrons in the Home Defence role. During this period, it was noted that the 33 acres (13 ha) site was prone to flooding from the nearby River Ouse. It was pressed back into service during the Second World War as a relief landing ground for No. 4 Elementary Flying Training School, who were based at nearby Brough airfield (to the east). The site had a grass runway which extended to 2,000 feet (610 m).
