= Old St Peter's Church, Laxton =

Building in Laxton, East Riding of Yorkshire, England

Coordinates: 53°43′10″N 0°48′02″W

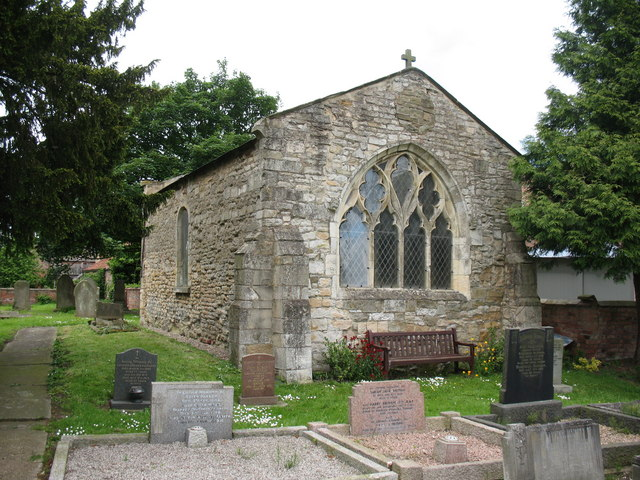
The building, in 2009

Old St Peter's Church is a historic building in Laxton, East Riding of Yorkshire, a village in England.

A chapel of ease to Howden Minster was built in Laxton around 1330, dedicated to John the Evangelist. In the 16th century, the land providing its endowment was seized by Henry VIII and the chapel fell into disrepair. In 1625, the surviving chancel of the chapel was restored and a new nave and tower of brick added. The construction was funded by Anne, Elizabeth and Grace Dorey, and on completion, the chapel was dedicated to Saint Peter. Maintenance continued to prove difficult; in 1769, £1,200 was collected for repairs. In 1858, it was given its own parish. Between 1875 and 1876, a new St Peter's Church, Laxton was constructed, following which, most of the old building was demolished, only the chancel being preserved. This was grade II listed in 1966.

It is in stone and has a Welsh slate roof with stone coped gables and shaped kneelers. There is a single bay, a plain pointed doorway on the west and a lancet window on the north. On the east side is a Decorated window with four lights, flanked by angle buttresses, and above is a blind oculus.

== See also ==
- Listed buildings in Laxton, East Riding of Yorkshire
