= Metham (disambiguation) =

Metham is a hamlet in the East Riding of Yorkshire, England.

Metham may also refer to:

- Metham sodium, a pesticide
- George Metham, a member of parliament
- Thomas Metham, an English Catholic knight
