= Hive, East Riding of Yorkshire =

Hamlet in the East Riding of Yorkshire, England

Coordinates: 53.768576°N 0.756581°W

Hive
- Location within the East Riding of Yorkshire
- OS grid reference: SE820309
  - London: 155 mi (249 km) S
- Civil parish: Gilberdyke
- Unitary authority: East Riding of Yorkshire
- Ceremonial county: East Riding of Yorkshire
- Region: Yorkshire and the Humber
- Country: England
- Sovereign state: United Kingdom
- Post town: BROUGH
- Postcode district: HU15
- Dialling code: 01430
- Police: Humberside
- Fire: Humberside
- Ambulance: Yorkshire
- UK Parliament: Goole and Pocklington

Hive is a hamlet in the East Riding of Yorkshire, England. It is situated approximately 8 miles (13 km) west of Brough and 7 miles (11 km) north-east of Goole. It lies just to the north of the M62 motorway.

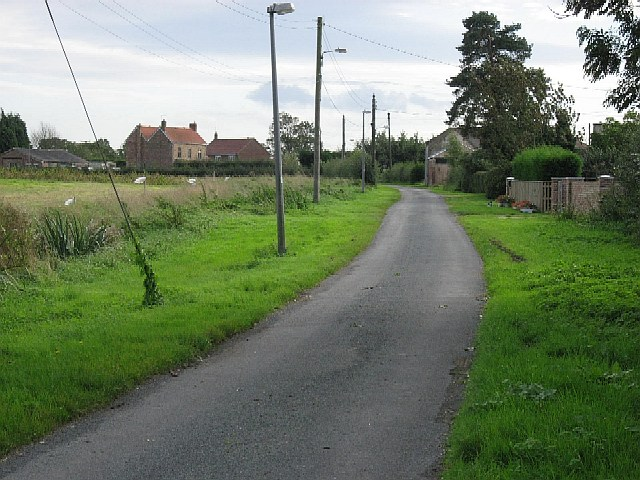
Hive

Hive forms part of the civil parish of Gilberdyke.

In 1823 Hive was in the civil parish of Eastrington, and the Wapentake and Liberty of Howdenshire. Occupations at the time included six farmers.
