= Cotness =

Hamlet in the East Riding of Yorkshire, England

Coordinates: 53.708348°N 0.791310°W

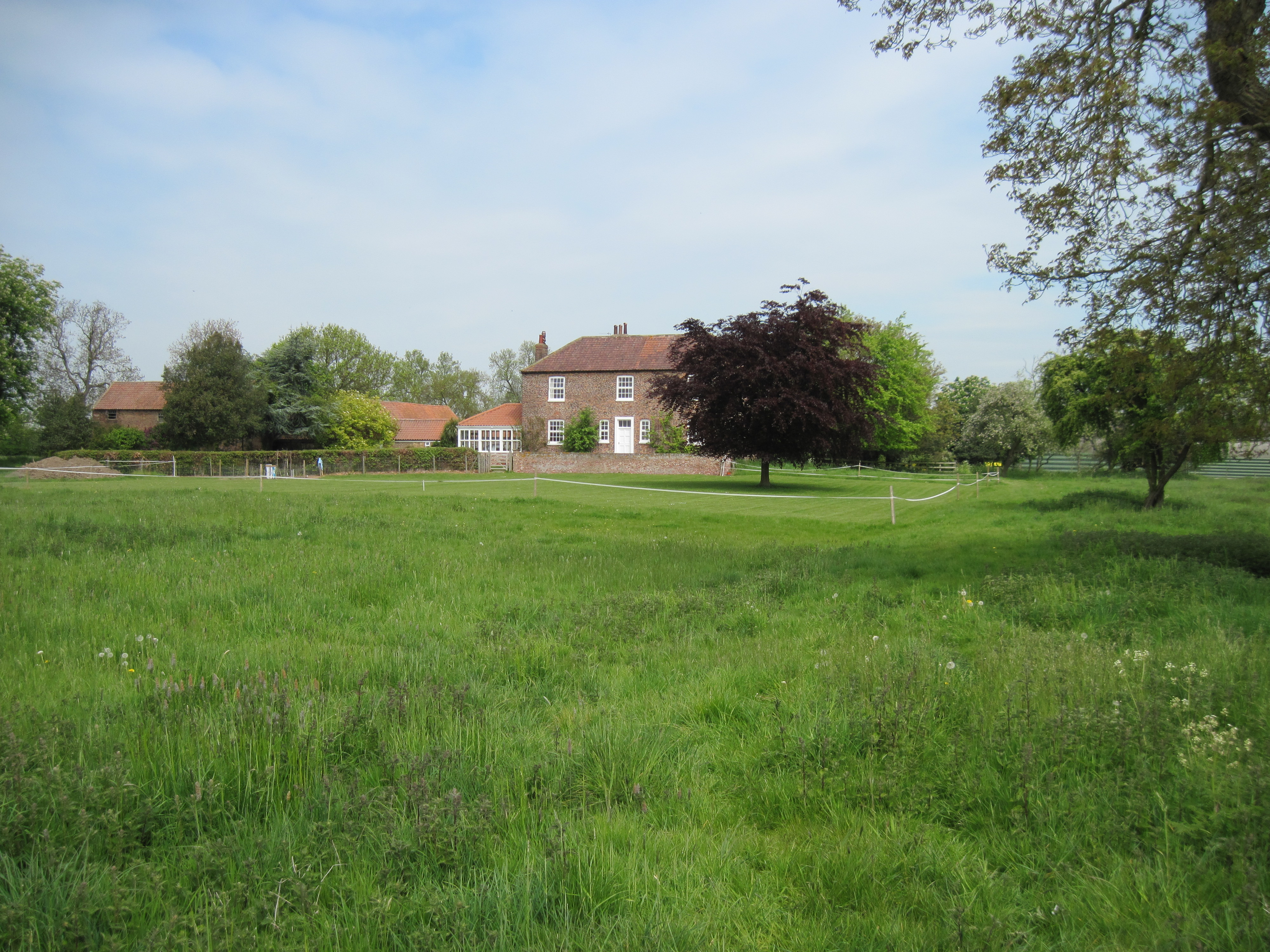
- Cotness Hall

- Location within the East Riding of Yorkshire
- OS grid reference: SE798242
  - London: 150 mi (240 km) S
- Civil parish: Laxton
- Unitary authority: East Riding of Yorkshire
- Ceremonial county: East Riding of Yorkshire
- Region: Yorkshire and the Humber
- Country: England
- Sovereign state: United Kingdom
- Post town: GOOLE
- Postcode district: DN14
- Dialling code: 01430
- Police: Humberside
- Fire: Humberside
- Ambulance: Yorkshire
- UK Parliament: Goole and Pocklington

Cotness is a small hamlet in the civil parish of Laxton, in the East Riding of Yorkshire, England. It is situated just to the north of the River Ouse, approximately 3 miles (5 km) south-east of Howden.

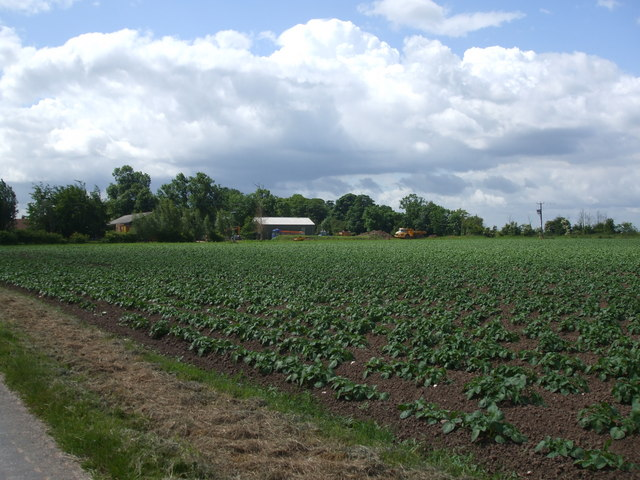
Manor farm

== History ==
The name Cotness derives from the Old English cotnæss meaning 'cottage ness'.

Cotness was formerly a township in the parish of Howden, in 1866 Cotness became a separate civil parish, on 1 April 1935 the parish was abolished and merged with Laxton, Eastrington and Howden. In 1931 the parish had a population of 24.

== See also ==
- Listed buildings in Laxton, East Riding of Yorkshire
