= Blacktoft =

Village and civil parish in the East Riding of Yorkshire, England

Coordinates: 53.708164°N 0.725865°W

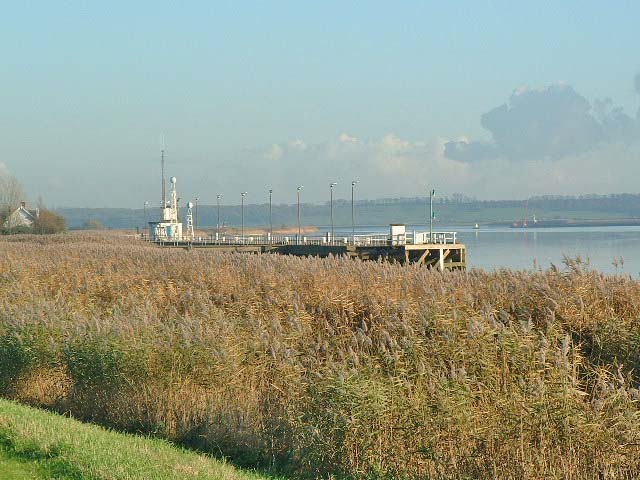
- Blacktoft Wharf, on the banks of the River Ouse

- Location within the East Riding of Yorkshire
- Population: 322 (2011 Census)
- OS grid reference: SE842242
  - London: 150 mi (240 km) S
- Civil parish: Blacktoft
- Unitary authority: East Riding of Yorkshire
- Ceremonial county: East Riding of Yorkshire
- Region: Yorkshire and the Humber
- Country: England
- Sovereign state: United Kingdom
- Post town: GOOLE
- Postcode district: DN14
- Dialling code: 01430
- Police: Humberside
- Fire: Humberside
- Ambulance: Yorkshire
- UK Parliament: Goole and Pocklington

Blacktoft is a village and civil parish in the East Riding of Yorkshire, England. The village is situated on the north bank of the River Ouse, 1 mile (1.6 km) west from where it joins the River Trent and becomes the Humber. It is approximately 6 miles (10 km) east from Howden and 23 miles (37 km) south-east from the county town of York. Blacktoft lies within the Parliamentary constituency of Goole and Pocklington.

The civil parish of Blacktoft consists of the village of Blacktoft, Bellasize, Faxfleet and Yokefleet. According to the 2011 UK Census the parish had a population of 322, an increase of one on the 2001 UK census figure.

Blacktoft Sands RSPB reserve lies across the Ouse. The relatively new island of Whitton Island in the Humber Estuary falls partly within the parish.

== History ==
According to A Dictionary of British Place Names, Blacktoft's joint derivation is from the Old English with Old Scandinavian for "dark coloured homestead." In c. 1160 it was recorded as "Blaketofte."

In 1823 Blacktoft was in the wapentake of Howdenshire. It had a population of 268, with occupations including two farmers, a corn miller, blacksmith, tailor, shoemaker, and a carpenter, and a coal dealer who was also the landlord of the Bay Horse public house. Professions included a church curate. There were two surveyors of highways providing for the maintenance of parish roads. The village had a chapel and its own parish constable. At that time on the opposite bank of the Ouse, "great quantities" of river vessels were at times docked in what was considered good anchorage, and steamboats passed on the route between Selby or Thorne and Hull. Low tide exposed sand beds, the sand from which was used as ballast for small craft.

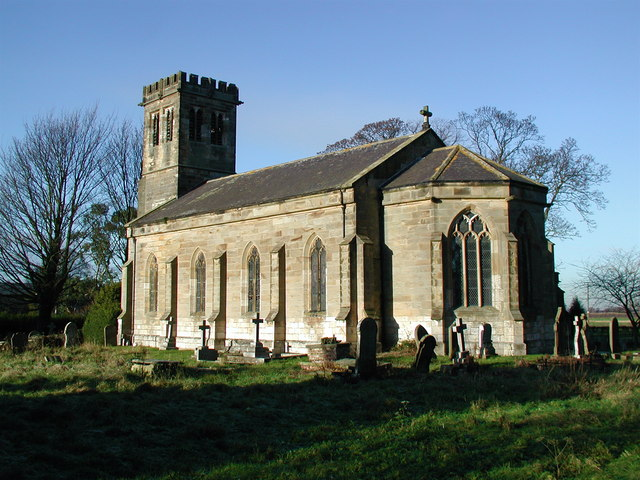
Holy Trinity Church Blacktoft

The Anglican Holy Trinity Church, Blacktoft, was designated a Grade II listed building in 1966 and is now recorded in the National Heritage List for England, maintained by Historic England. The church was constructed in 1841 by John Harper, of ashlar masonry with a west tower, Perpendicular-style windows, and a nave with apse at the east. The stability of a previous Blacktoft church was causing concern in the early 1740s. A contemporary court report noted that the chancel of the church had been re-built to a lower height than one existing earlier, resulting in a gap between the top of the new chancel and nave. This gap was closed by stooths—wooden studs or battens—on the exterior of the nave supporting a beam. The court heard that the earlier higher chancel roof had collapsed in the early 1660s as the congregation were leaving the church—this information was treated with scepticism by a prosecutor, but was supported by local masons and carpenters.

In 1842 Blacktoft ecclesiastical parish covered an area of 2,730 acres (11 km^{2}), and had a population of 394. The parish register dated from 1700. The Chapelry of Blacktoft had been held by the Bishop of Durham and Durham Monastery—who provided for a stipendiary (paid) priest—up to the reign of Edward VI, this afterwards being granted to a William Jobson, a Hull merchant, who became lay patron (impropriator) of Blacktoft incumbent clergy. Patronage reverted to the Dean and Chapter of Durham Cathedral during the reign of George I.

Blacktoft Inclosure Act 1830
- Act of Parliament
- Parliament of the United Kingdom
- Long title: An Act for inclosing Lands in the Townships of Blacktoft, Gilberdike and Faxfleet, in the Parish or Parochial Chapelry of Blacktoft and in the Parishes of Eastrington and South Cave, in the East Riding of the County of York.
- Citation: 11 Geo. 4 & 1 Will. 4. c. 13 Pr.

Dates
- Royal assent: 29 May 1830

In the late 18th century the inclosure of land at Blacktoft was enacted by the Inclosure Act 1773. A further Blacktoft land inclosure act, the Blacktoft Inclosure Act 1830 (11 Geo. 4 & 1 Will. 4. c. 13 Pr.) was passed, with this act including the lands of Gilberdyke and Faxfleet.

In early December 2013 Blacktoft, among other regional settlements including Reedness, Saltmarshe, North Ferriby, Hessle and Kingston upon Hull and many more, was subject to flooding due to a tidal surge on the Humber, the largest in 60 years. According to the Environment Agency, damage caused would have been worse had it not been for the Hull Tidal Surge Barrier. A 2014 Flood Investigation Report from East Riding of Yorkshire Council recommended that affected property owners should "develop a personal flood plan". However, improved flood defences are likely to be introduced across the Humber Estuary including the significant raising of the river bank in order to ensure such flooding does not happen again. The Environment Agency expressed confidence in such flood defences being improved by the government in order to prevent flooding re-occurring in the Haltemprice and Howden constituency and across the East Riding of Yorkshire.

== See also ==
- Listed buildings in Blacktoft
