= Bennetland =

Hamlet in the East Riding of Yorkshire, England

Coordinates: 53.749305°N 0.748885°W

- Location within the East Riding of Yorkshire
- OS grid reference: SE826288
  - London: 155 mi (249 km) S
- Civil parish: Gilberdyke
- Unitary authority: East Riding of Yorkshire
- Ceremonial county: East Riding of Yorkshire
- Region: Yorkshire and the Humber
- Country: England
- Sovereign state: United Kingdom
- Post town: BROUGH
- Postcode district: HU15
- Dialling code: 01430
- Police: Humberside
- Fire: Humberside
- Ambulance: Yorkshire
- UK Parliament: Goole and Pocklington

Bennetland is a hamlet in the East Riding of Yorkshire, England. It is situated approximately 19 miles (31 km) west of Hull city centre and 5 miles (8 km) east of Howden town centre. Smith suggests that the name, first recorded in 1234, means stretch of land overgrown with bent grass.

It lies less than 1 mile (1.6 km) west from Gilberdyke, and is south of the M62 motorway and just to the south of the B1230 road. Bennetland lies between the Selby Line and the Hull and Doncaster Branch and is served by Gilberdyke railway station.

The hamlet forms part of the civil parish of Gilberdyke.

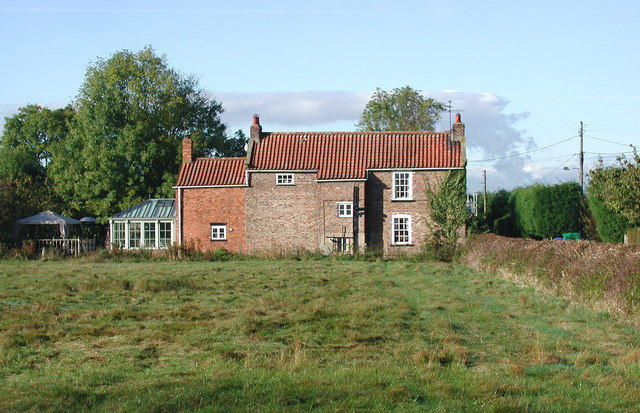
Crumble Manor, Bennetland
