= Saltmarshe railway station =

Railway station in the East Riding of Yorkshire, England

Saltmarshe
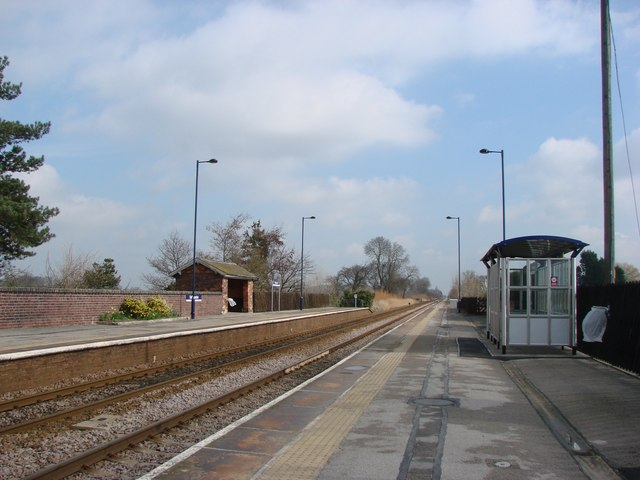

General information
- Location: Laxton, East Riding of Yorkshire; England
- Coordinates: 53.7222°N 0.8070°W
- Grid reference: SE786257
- Manager: Northern Trains
- Platforms: 2

Other information
- Station code: SAM
- Classification: DfT category F2

History
- Opened: 1869

Passengers
- 2021/22: ▲890
- 2022/23: ▲1,078
- 2023/24: ▲1,180
- 2024/25: ▲1,566
- 2025/26: ▲2,746
Location
Notes
- Passenger statistics from the Office of Rail and Road

Saltmarshe railway station is a railway station on the Hull and Doncaster Branch between Goole and Gilberdyke stations. It serves the village of Laxton, East Riding of Yorkshire, England.

The station was opened in 1869 as part of the North Eastern Railway's Hull and Doncaster Branch.

== Description ==
The station and all trains serving it are operated by Northern. There used to be a signal box at the west end of the platforms on the southern side of the line, which controlled the level crossing at the site. It was abolished and removed in the autumn of 2018 as part of signalling upgrade work in the area.

It is named after Saltmarshe, one mile south of the station, on the north bank of the River Ouse.

Facilities at the unstaffed station are basic, with no ticketing provision and no permanent buildings other than waiting shelters on each platform. Train information can be obtained from timetable posters or by telephone. There is step-free access on each side, but the Hull-bound platform requires the use of a barrow crossing alongside the signal box. Mobility-impaired users are advised not to use it without assistance.

== Services ==
The station is served by a limited number of trains between Hull and Doncaster. Currently 17 trains per day call. Northbound there are seven trains to Hull, with the first northbound train in the morning continuing to Scarborough via Beverley.

Southbound there are 10 trains to Doncaster (of which one early morning service continues to Sheffield). Passengers for intermediate stations between Doncaster and Sheffield now have to change at Doncaster as the Hull to Sheffield stopping service has been cut into two after the December 2019 timetable change.

There is no Sunday service.

Preceding station	National Rail	Following station
Goole	Northern Trains Hull and Doncaster Branch Monday-Saturday only	Gilberdyke
