= Howden Dyke Island =

Island in the River Ouse in East Riding of Yorkshire, England

Coordinates: 53.724367°N 0.862262°W

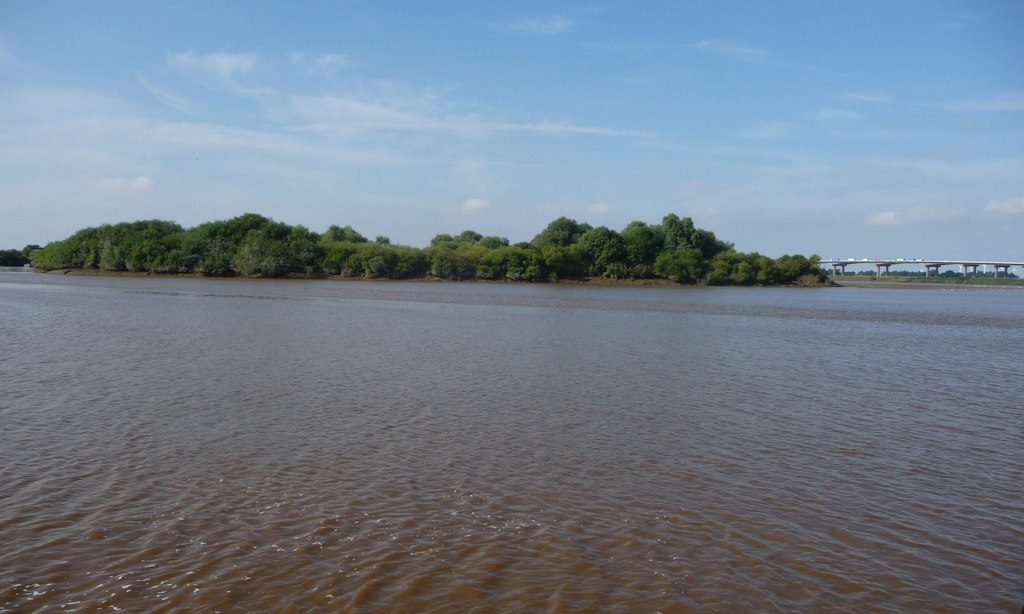
The northern tip of Howden Dyke Island

Howden Dyke Island is a 19-acre (7.7 ha) island in the River Ouse, Yorkshire. More accurately a shoal between seasonally varying flows, the area regularly above water (and covered in trees and vegetation) is roughly 1,380 by 890 feet (420 by 270 m). A larger example of this same feature is visible where the Ouse widens into the Humber Estuary, 12 miles (19 km) downstream at Faxfleet.

The island has also been known as Hook Island and Silverpit Island, and was formerly used for agriculture, and connected to the riverbank. However, this land use combined with the digging of a fishing pond in the 1920s, eroded a channel to make an island in the 1950s, subsequently washing away soil until the island was inaccessible and, at high water, less than half its current size. Today, vegetation on the island and the riverbank opposite help to protect against erosion. The land has been used for wild-fowling, and is home to a wide range of birds and other wildlife. It forms unit 02 of the Humber Estuary Site of Special Scientific Interest, and is in favourable condition.

In 2009, the island was marketed as land available for private development, at a price of £100,000. At the time the island was only accessible by boat, and a tidal range of up to six metres would inhibit habitation, other than on a special stilted construction.

In 2014 the island was bought for £47,500 by the Royal Society for the Protection of Birds to protect its wildlife habitat.
