= Yokefleet =

Hamlet in the East Riding of Yorkshire, England

Coordinates: 53.708660°N 0.760242°W

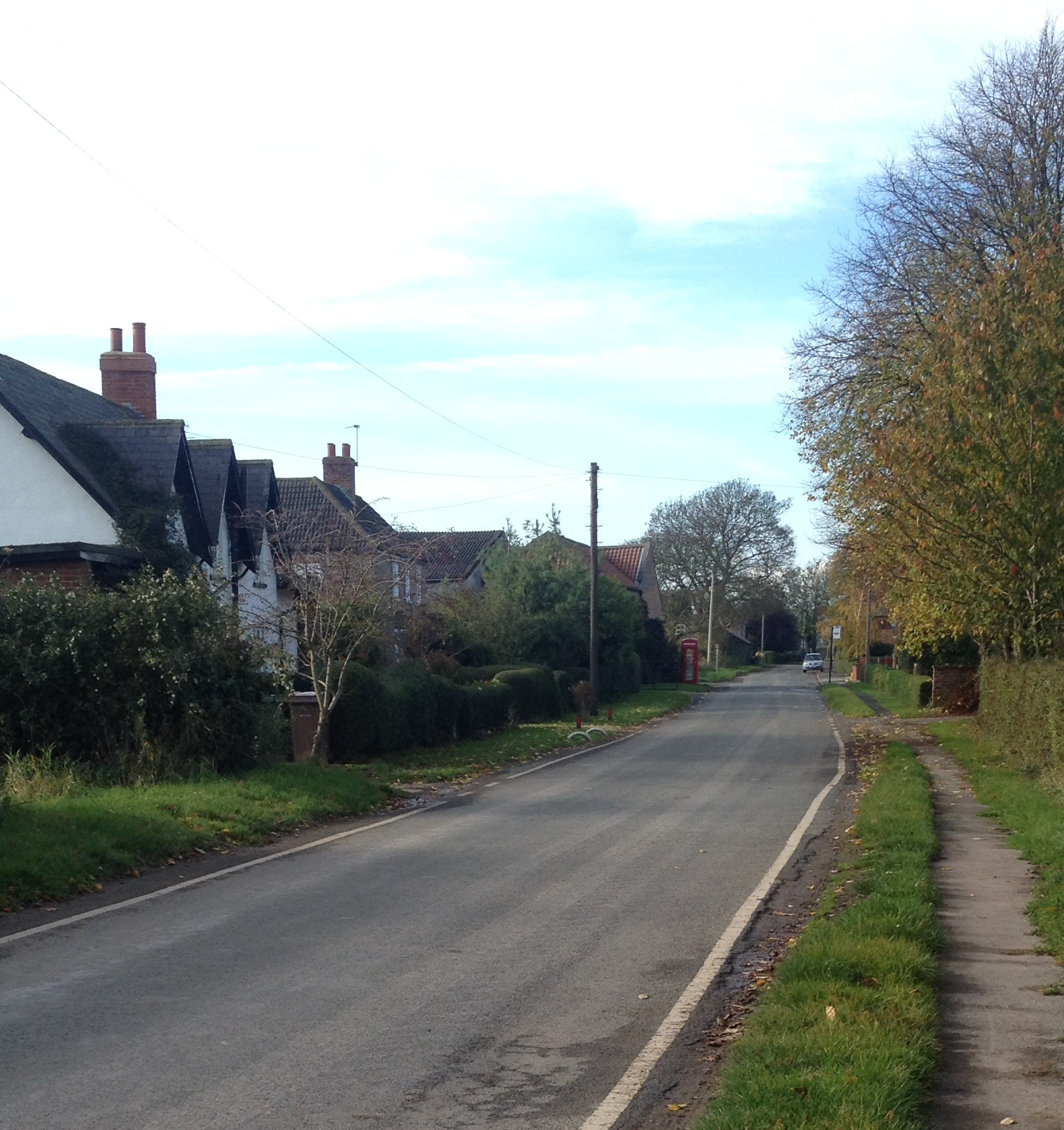
- Looking west on Greenoak Lane, Yokefleet

- Location within the East Riding of Yorkshire
- OS grid reference: SE819242
  - London: 155 mi (249 km) S
- Civil parish: Blacktoft; Laxton
- Unitary authority: East Riding of Yorkshire
- Ceremonial county: East Riding of Yorkshire
- Region: Yorkshire and the Humber
- Country: England
- Sovereign state: United Kingdom
- Post town: GOOLE
- Postcode district: DN14
- Dialling code: 01430
- Police: Humberside
- Fire: Humberside
- Ambulance: Yorkshire
- UK Parliament: Goole and Pocklington

Yokefleet (also known as Yorkfleet) is a hamlet and former civil parish, now in the parish of Blacktoft, in the East Riding of Yorkshire, England. A very small part of Yokefleet is in the civil parish of Laxton. It is situated on the north bank of the River Ouse, downstream from York, Selby and Goole. In 1931 the parish had a population of 102.

Yokefleet is approximately 4 miles (6.4 km) south-east from Howden and 20 miles (32 km) south-east from the county town of York. Yokefleet lies within the Parliamentary constituency of Goole and Pocklington.

Yokefleet Hall is a Grade II listed mansion house of Victorian design by architect Cuthbert Brodrick. The hall is on the eastern edge of the hamlet and the current house was built between 1868 and 1874 according to the York Georgian Society.

== History ==
The name Yokefleet derives from the Old Norse personal name Jokell, and the Old English flēot meaning 'stream'.

Yokefleet is one of the ancient manors mentioned in the Domesday Book of 1086. The original Manor House was located on a moated site in the hamlet.

In 1823 Yokefleet had a population of 199, which included a yeoman farmer, a corn miller, and a cattle dealer. It contained a windmill which served "as a mark for sailors to navigate the river". By 1831 Yokefleet population had dropped to 190, within a parish area of 950 acres (384 ha) which included ecclesiastical land and Walling Fen. The land mainly belonged to the Empson family who were impropriators—lay persons as patrons of incumbent clergy. There was a Wesleyan chapel. Occupations by this time included seven farmers, a school teacher for the local school, a corn miller, tailor, and two shoemakers, one of whom was a shopkeeper. A descendant of the Empson family, born at Yokefleet Hall, was literary critic and poet Sir William Empson (1906 – 1984).

Prince Philip named his horse after Yokefleet and was seen having trouble controlling the horse at Horse Guards Parade, London in 1953.

In early December 2013 Yokefleet, among other regional settlements was subject to flooding due to a tidal surge on the Ouse the largest in 60 years. According to the Environment Agency, damage caused would have been worse had it not been for the flood defences in place across the region. A 2014 Flood Investigation Report from East Riding of Yorkshire Council recommended that affected property owners should "develop a personal flood plan". However, improved flood defences are likely to be introduced across the region, including the significant raising of the river bank in order to ensure such flooding does not reoccur. The Environment Agency expressed confidence in such flood defences being improved by the government in order to prevent further flooding in the Haltemprice and Howden constituency and across the East Riding of Yorkshire.

== Governance ==
Yokefleet was formerly a township in the parish of Howden, in 1866 Yokefleet became a civil parish, on 1 April 1935 the parish was abolished and merged with Blacktoft, part also went to Howden and to form Gilberdyke.

== Gallery ==
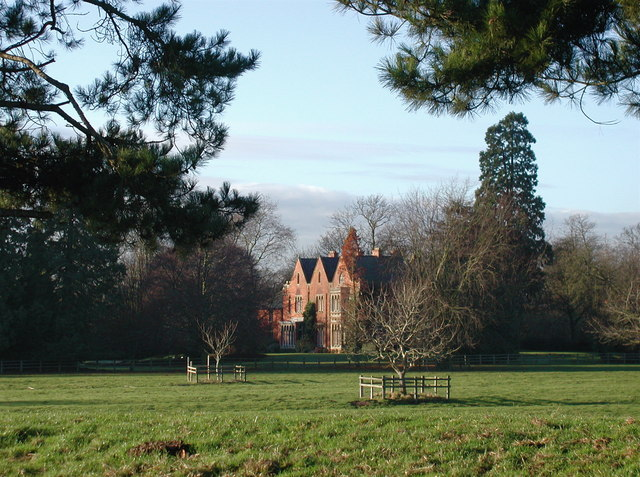
Yokefleet Hall

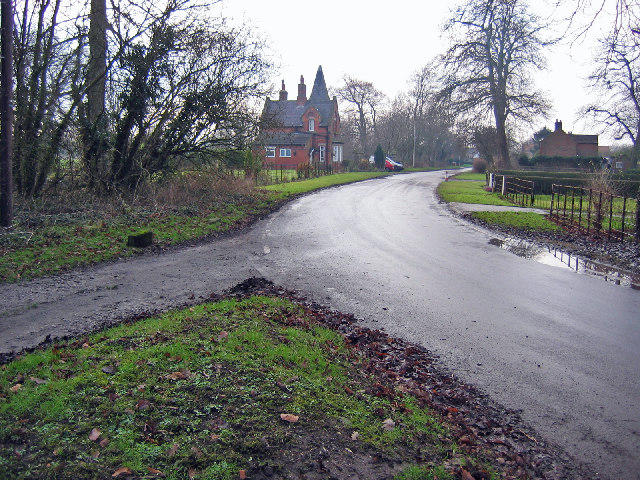
Looking west into Yokefleet from near the Manor House

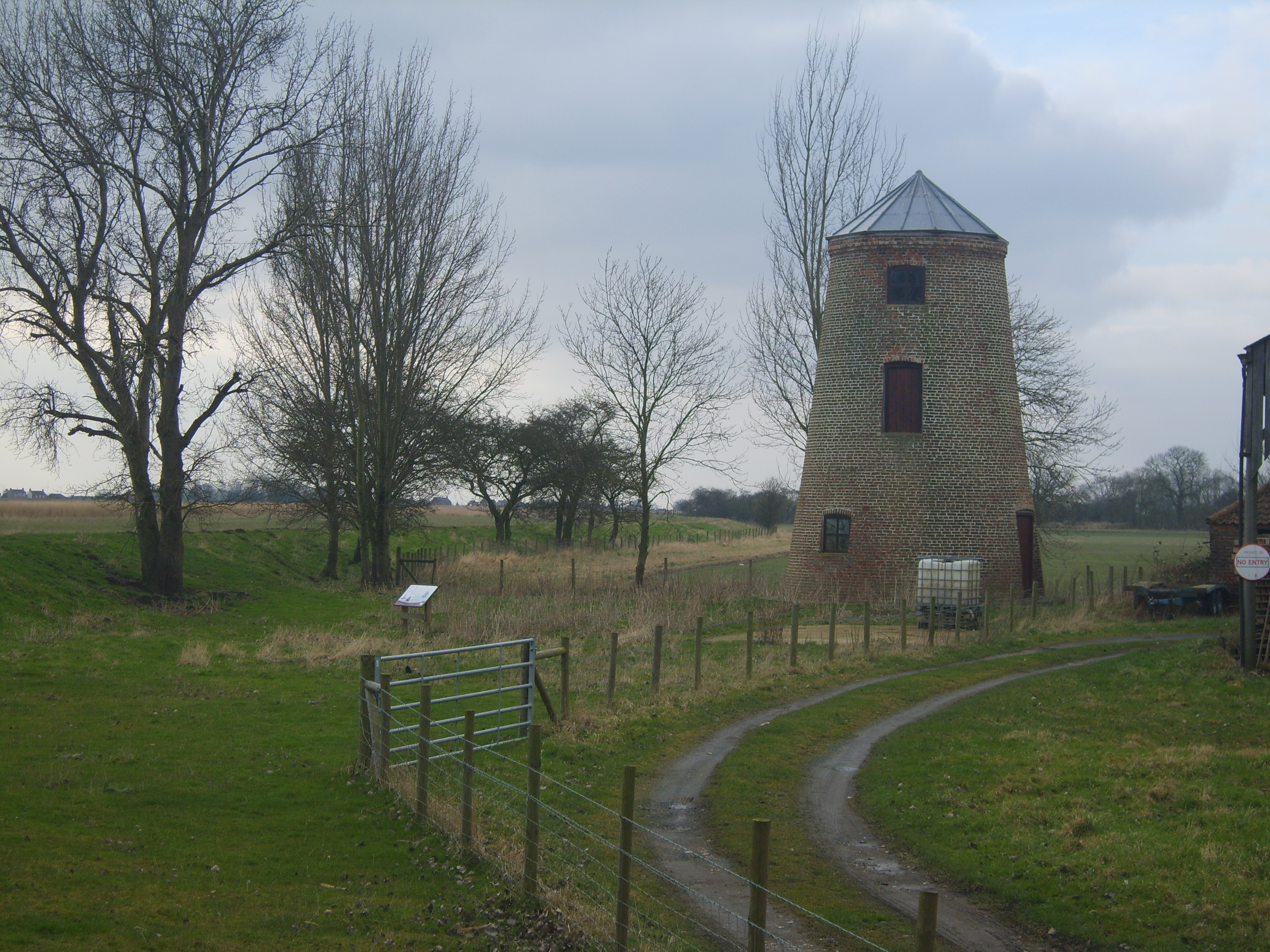
Historic windmill at River Ouse, Yokefleet

== Notable people ==
- Sir William Empson – Literary critic and poet

== See also ==
- Listed buildings in Blacktoft
