= RAF Bellasize =

Former RAF flying station in Yorkshire, England

RAF Bellasize
- Gilberdyke, East Riding of Yorkshire in England

Site information
- Owner: Air Ministry
- Operator: Royal Air Force
- Controlled by: RAF Flying Training Command

Location
- RAF Bellasize
- Coordinates: 53.737°N 0.762°W
- Grid reference: SE817724
- Area: 33 acres (13 ha)
- Height: 12 feet (3.7 m)

Site history
- In use: April 1916 – May 1919; November 1939 – July 1945
- Battles/wars: European theatre of World War II

Airfield information
Runways
Direction	Length and surface
	2,000 feet (610 m) Grass

Royal Air Force Bellasize, also known as RAF Bellasize, was a former RAF airfield in the hamlet of Bellasize, near Gilberdyke, East Riding of Yorkshire, England. Originally opened in 1916, Bellasize was one of only four Yorkshire-based RAF locations to see use in the First and Second World Wars. Flying at Bellasize was sporadic and training based, with the site not being used in an offensive capacity during the Second World War.

== History ==
Bellasize appears to have been equipped with just one runway, which was a grass strip measuring 2,000 feet (610 m) angled in a north east/south west direction across a rectangular field. There are no records of any hangars or permanent buildings at the site.

The site was opened in April 1916 as a 1st class landing ground. (Note: Philpott refers to the base as Bellsize rather than Bellasize.) It was originally used by No. 33 and No. 76 Squadrons in the Home Defence (HD) role, even though its proximity to the River Ouse meant that the airfield was often flooded; Bellasize was only 12 feet (3.7 m) above sea level. The site was handed over to the Royal Air Force in April 1918, and then relinquished a year later in April 1919.

However, during the Second World War, the site was reactivated, and covered an area of 33 acres (13 ha), measuring 420 yards (380 m) by 380 yards (350 m). Bellasize was one of only four sites used by the RAF in the First and Second World Wars, (the other being Driffield, Doncaster and Catterick). For the entire period of the war, Bellasize belonged to RAF Flying Training Command, and was used as relief landing ground (RLG) by No. 4 Elementary Flying Training School RAF (No. 4 EFTS). No. 4 EFTS was based at nearby Brough Aerodrome, and the increased use of Bellasize was due to the prevalence of aircraft movements at Brough originating from the aircraft factory. Flying at RAF Bellasize ceased in July 1945.

The site has been converted back to farmland.
