= Newland, Eastrington =

Hamlet in the East Riding of Yorkshire, England

Coordinates: 53.751876°N 0.784677°W

Newland
- Hamlet
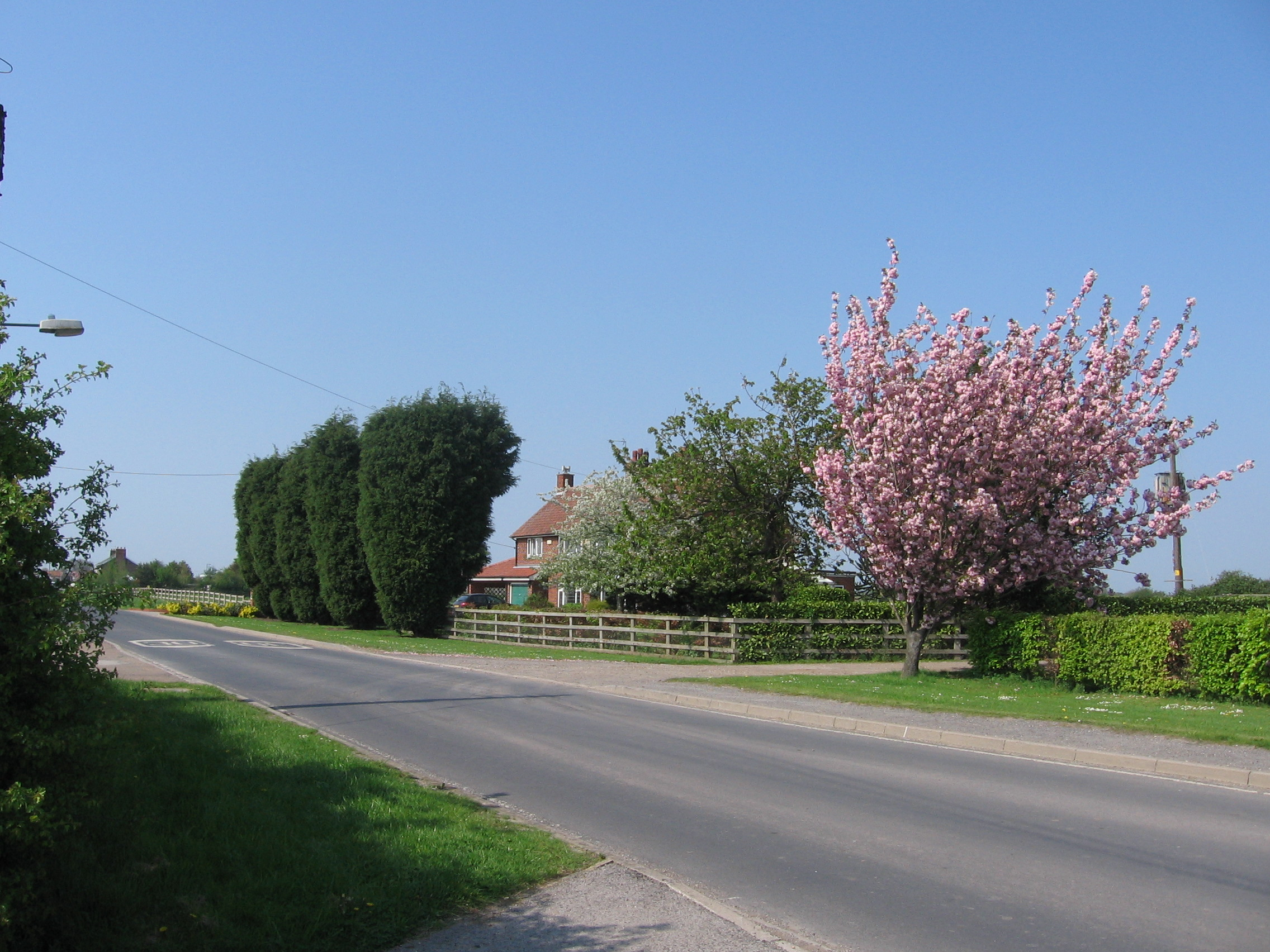
- Manor Farm, Newland

- Location within the East Riding of Yorkshire
- Population: 404
- OS grid reference: SE802290
  - London: 155 mi (249 km) S
- Civil parish: Eastrington
- Unitary authority: East Riding of Yorkshire
- Ceremonial county: East Riding of Yorkshire
- Region: Yorkshire and the Humber
- Country: England
- Sovereign state: United Kingdom
- Post town: GOOLE
- Postcode district: DN14
- Dialling code: 01430
- Police: Humberside
- Fire: Humberside
- Ambulance: Yorkshire
- UK Parliament: Goole and Pocklington

Newland is a hamlet in the East Riding of Yorkshire, England. It is situated approximately 3 miles (5 km) east of Howden and lies north of the B1230 road and it straddles the M62 motorway. It is served by Eastrington railway station on the Hull to York Line.

It forms part of the civil parish of Eastrington. Newland lies within the Parliamentary constituency of Goole and Pocklington.

In 1823 Newland (then New Land), was in the parishes of Eastrington and Howden, and the Wapentake and Liberty of Howdenshire.
