= Scalby =

Scalby may refer to:

- Scalby, East Riding of Yorkshire, England, a village
- Scalby, North Yorkshire, a village
  - Scalby railway station
- Sea Cut (Scalby Beck), also known as Scalby Brook, a small river that enters the North Sea at Scalby Mills, Scarborough, North Yorkshire
- Scalby School, Scarborough, North Yorkshire, a coeducational secondary school

== See also ==
- Scalby Formation, a geological formation in England
