= Sandholme railway station =

Disused railway station in the East Riding of Yorkshire, England

Sandholme

General information
- Location: Sandholme, East Riding of Yorkshire; England
- Coordinates: 53.763400°N 0.740100°W
- Grid reference: SE831305
- Platforms: 2

Other information
- Status: Disused

History
- Original company: Hull, Barnsley and West Riding Junction Railway
- Pre-grouping: Hull and Barnsley Railway
- Post-grouping: London and North Eastern Railway

Key dates
- 1885: opened
- 1955: closed to passengers
- 1959: closed for freight
Location

Sandholme railway station was a station on the Hull and Barnsley Railway, and served the hamlet of Sandholme in the East Riding of Yorkshire, England.

The station opened on 27 July 1885, it was closed to passengers on 1 August 1955 and closed completely on 6 April 1959.

Preceding station	Disused railways	Following station
North Eastrington	Hull and Barnsley Railway	Wallingfen
