= Owsthorpe =

Hamlet in the East Riding of Yorkshire, England

Coordinates: 53.769195°N 0.773025°W

- Location within the East Riding of Yorkshire
- OS grid reference: SE809310
- Civil parish: Eastrington
- Unitary authority: East Riding of Yorkshire
- Ceremonial county: East Riding of Yorkshire
- Region: Yorkshire and the Humber
- Country: England
- Sovereign state: United Kingdom
- Post town: GOOLE
- Postcode district: DN14
- Dialling code: 01430
- Police: Humberside
- Fire: Humberside
- Ambulance: Yorkshire
- UK Parliament: Goole and Pocklington

Owsthorpe is a small hamlet in the East Riding of Yorkshire, England. It is situated approximately 6 miles (9.7 km) north-east of Goole and lies 1 mile (1.6 km) north of the M62 motorway.

It forms part of the civil parish of Eastrington.

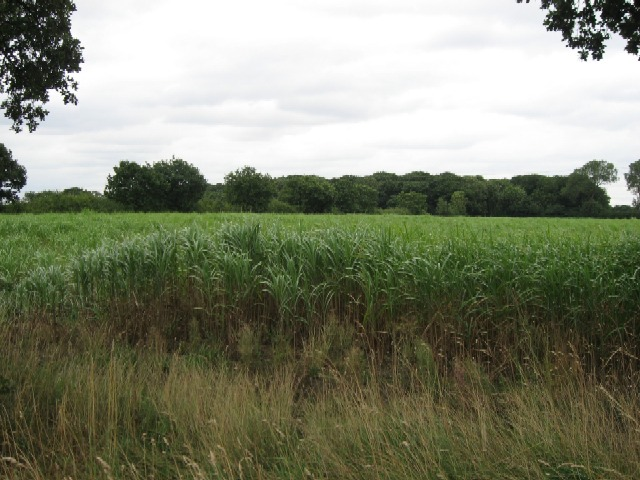
Typical view of area
