= Saltmarshe Hall =

Country house in Saltmarshe, East Riding of Yorkshire, England

Coordinates: 53.7063°N 0.8167°W

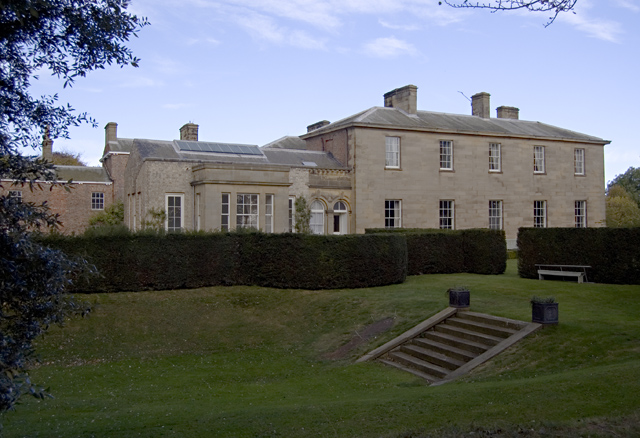
Saltmarshe Hall

Saltmarshe Hall is a grade II* listed 19th-century country house in Saltmarshe, East Riding of Yorkshire, England, on the north bank of the River Ouse across from Goole. It stands in 17 acres of gardens.

It is constructed of brick faced with ashlar with Welsh slate roofs. The square two storey main building has a five-bay frontage with a five-bay servant's wing attached.

== History ==
The Saltmarshe estate has belonged to the Saltmarshe family since the Norman Conquest in 1066.

The present house was built in 1825-8 by Prichett and Watson (James Pigott Pritchett and Charles Watson) for Philip Saltmarshe at a cost of £4000. Stables were added in 1842.

It descended to Colonel Phillip Saltmarshe (1853–1941), who joined the Royal Horse Artillery and fought in the Afghan and Boer Wars. He was also a J.P. and Deputy Lieutenant.

Captain Philip Saltmarshe was the last member of the family. He died in the early 1970s without an heir and the house was sold to Philip and Sally Bean. In 2009 it was offered for sale and purchased by the Whyte family.

== See also ==
- Grade II* listed buildings in the East Riding of Yorkshire
- Listed buildings in Laxton, East Riding of Yorkshire
