= Faxfleet =

Hamlet in the East Riding of Yorkshire, England

Coordinates: 53.706778°N 0.693107°W

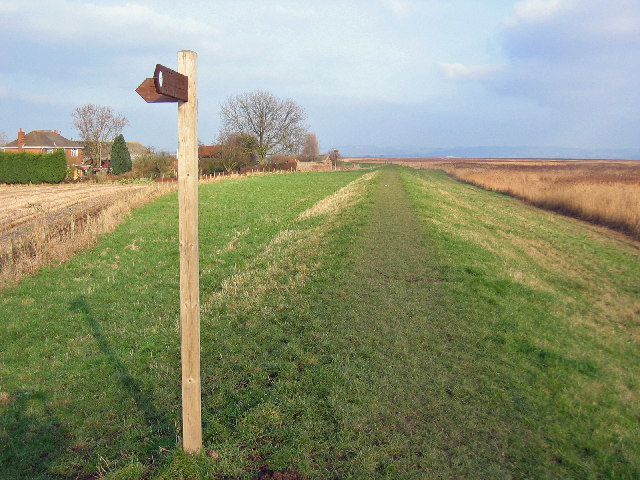

- Location within the East Riding of Yorkshire
- OS grid reference: SE863241
  - London: 150 mi (240 km) S
- Civil parish: Blacktoft
- Unitary authority: East Riding of Yorkshire
- Ceremonial county: East Riding of Yorkshire
- Region: Yorkshire and the Humber
- Country: England
- Sovereign state: United Kingdom
- Post town: GOOLE
- Postcode district: DN14
- Dialling code: 01430
- Police: Humberside
- Fire: Humberside
- Ambulance: Yorkshire
- UK Parliament: Goole and Pocklington

Faxfleet is a hamlet and former civil parish, now in the parish of Blacktoft, in the East Riding of Yorkshire, England. It is situated approximately 6 miles (10 km) west of Brough, and 9 miles (14 km) east of Howden, at the start of the Humber, on the north bank, where the River Ouse and the River Trent meet. In 1931 the parish had a population of 151. Just to the east of the hamlet is the entrance lock for the Weighton Canal, and also Whitton Island in the Humber.

== History ==
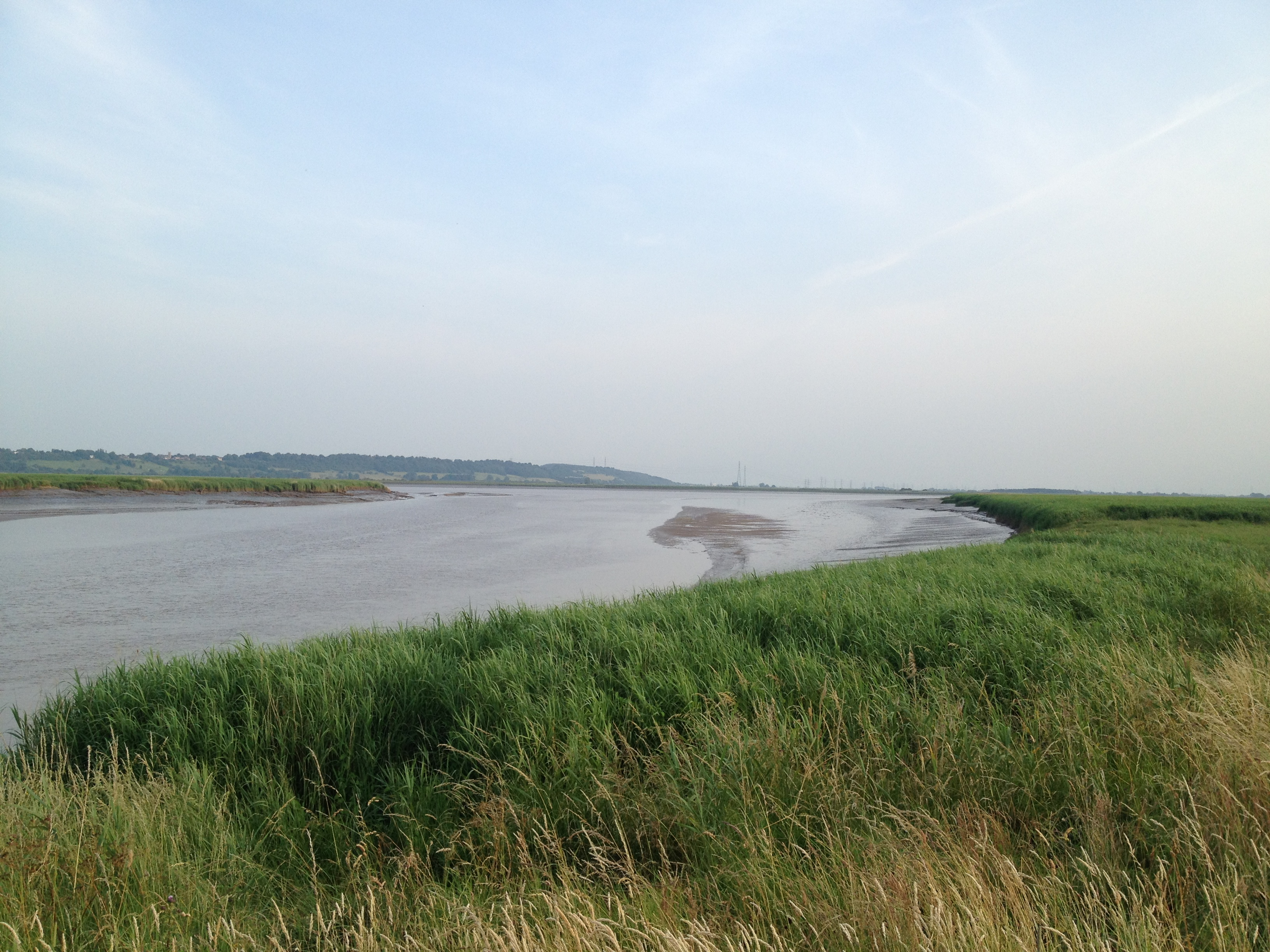
Looking west from the river bank at Faxfleet

There is evidence of Roman activity in the area, and it has been suggested that Faxfleet was the site of a small port. The name is first recorded in a Knights Templar document from 1185 as Faxflete; there is no record in the Domesday Book of a settlement at Faxfleet. The first element is possibly a personal name, Faxi, of Old Norse origin, or it is possibly from Feax, an Old English word meaning coarse grass. The suffix of fleet, indicates a river channel, or beck. Faxfleet was the location of the Faxfleet Preceptory, a former community of the Knights Templar, the only preceptory of this order in the East Riding. It was one of Yorkshire's principal preceptories, valued at more than £290 (equivalent to £280,000 in 2025) when it was closed in 1308. The manor was inherited in 1311 by Joanna, widow of Alexander Comyn.

In 1823 Faxfleet was listed as in the Wapentake of Harthill. Population was 163, with occupations including three farmers and a brick & tile maker. There was a gentleman who lived at the Hall, and two yeomen.

Faxfleet was formerly a township in the parish of South Cave, from 1866 Faxfleet was a civil parish in its own right, on 1 April 1935 the parish was abolished and merged with Blacktoft.

Faxfleet lies within the constituency of Goole and Pocklington.

== Population ==
Population of Faxfleet 1801–1931
1801	1811	1821	1831	1841	1851	1861	1871	1881	1891	1901	1911	1921	1931
139	180	163	177	358	312	290	269	249	206	177	171	160	151

Since 1935, the hamlet has been within the civil parish of Blacktoft, which at the 2011 census, had a population of 322.

== See also ==
- Listed buildings in Blacktoft
