= Holy Trinity Church, Blacktoft =

Church in Blacktoft, East Riding of Yorkshire, England

Coordinates: 53.7084°N 0.7272°W

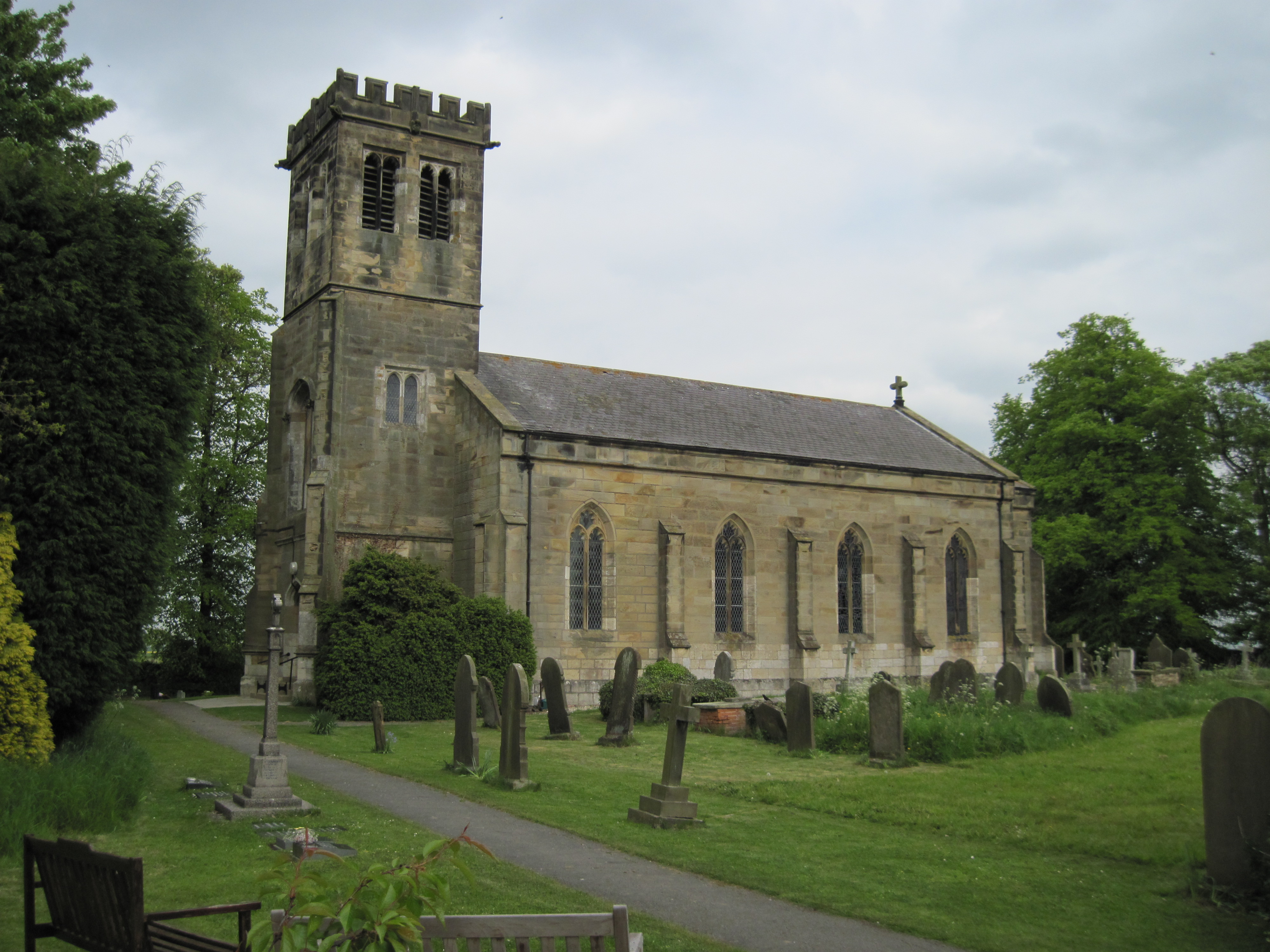
The church, in 2009

Holy Trinity Church is the parish church of Blacktoft, a village in the East Riding of Yorkshire, in England.

A chapel in Blacktoft was recorded in 1202. In 1742, there was a dispute over the roofing of the chancel, which led to a model of the church being presented in court. It was long in the parish of All Saints' Church, Brantingham, but in 1784 it was given its own parish. The church was rebuilt in 1841, to a design by John Harper. The work cost £1640, part of which was funded by the sale of the old materials. The building was grade II listed in 1966.

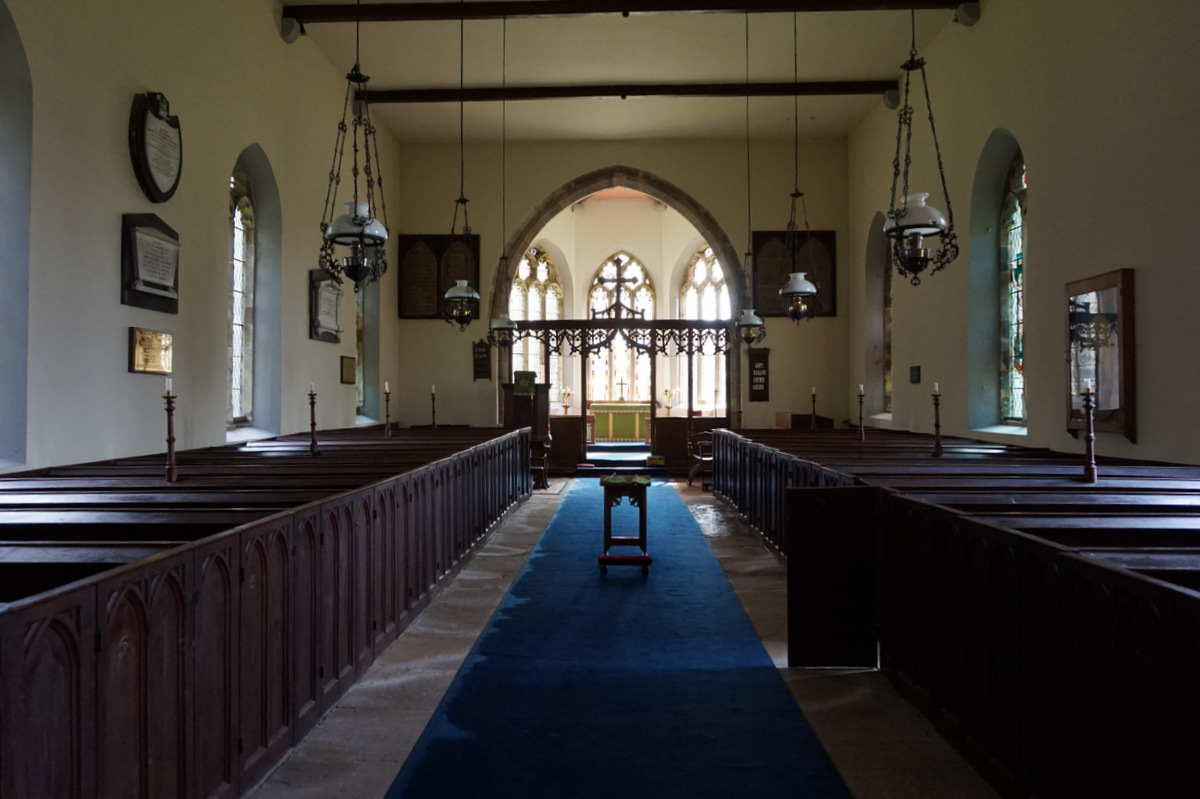
View from the nave into the chancel

The church is built of stone with a Welsh slate roof. It consists of a nave, a north vestry, a chancel with a polygonal apse, and a west tower. The tower has three stages, diagonal buttresses, a west doorway with a four-centred arch, a coved string course, above which is a three-light window, paired two-light bell openings, and an embattled parapet. Inside, the chancel arch survives from the old church, there is a west gallery and box pews. Two of the windows have stained glass by Harry Harvey.

== See also ==
- Listed buildings in Blacktoft
