= South Howden railway station =

Disused railway station in the East Riding of Yorkshire, England

South Howden

General information
- Location: Howden, East Riding of Yorkshire; England
- Coordinates: 53.749000°N 0.862000°W
- Grid reference: SE750287
- Platforms: 2

Other information
- Status: Disused

History
- Original company: Hull, Barnsley and West Riding Junction Railway
- Pre-grouping: Hull and Barnsley Railway
- Post-grouping: London and North Eastern Railway

Key dates
- 1885: opened
- 1955: closed to passengers
- 1959: closed for freight
Location

South Howden railway station was a station on the Hull and Barnsley Railway, and served the town of Howden in the East Riding of Yorkshire, England.

== History ==
The station opened on 22 July 1885 as Howden and was renamed in 1922. It was the second of two railway stations to serve the town and was situated on the northern edge of the town.

It was closed to passengers on 1 August 1955 and closed completely on 6 April 1959. Howden is still served by the original Howden railway station, but it is situated approximately 1 1/2 miles (2.4 km) north of the town.

Preceding station	Disused railways	Following station
Barmby	Hull and Barnsley Railway	North Eastrington
