= Listed buildings in Blacktoft =

Blacktoft is a civil parish in the county of the East Riding of Yorkshire, England. It contains six listed buildings that are recorded in the National Heritage List for England. All the listed buildings are designated at Grade II, the lowest of the three grades, which is applied to "buildings of national importance and special interest". The parish contains the village of Blacktoft, the hamlets of Yokefleet and Faxfleet, and the surrounding countryside. The listed buildings consist of a farmhouse, a house, a former chapel, a church and a country house and its lodge.

== Buildings ==
Name and location	Photograph	Date	Notes
Home Farmhouse; 53.70817°N 0.75935°W	—	Early to mid-18th century	The farmhouse is in brick, with a floor band and a Welsh slate roof, hipped on the left. There are two storeys, three bays, and a rear cross wing. The central doorway has a segmental arch, to its left is a bow window, and the other windows are sashes with flat brick arches.
The Beeches; 53.70639°N 0.69406°W		Late 18th century	The house is in brick with a pantile roof. There are two storeys, three bays, and a rear cross wing. The central doorway has pilasters, a semicircular radial fanlight, and a dentilled open pediment. The windows are sashes under segmental arches.
Former Wesleyan Chapel; 53.70780°N 0.72077°W		1839	The chapel, which has been converted for residential use, is in brick, and has a roof in slate and pantile, with coped gables and shaped kneelers. There is a single storey and three bays, and a single-storey extension on the left. In the centre is a doorway, and the windows are sashes, all with cambered brick arches. Above the doorway is a datestone.
Holy Trinity Church; 53.70844°N 0.72707°W		1841–42	The church, designed by John Harper, is in stone with a Welsh slate roof. It consists of a nave, a north vestry, a chancel with a polygonal apse, and a west tower. The tower has three stages, diagonal buttresses, a west doorway with a four-centred arch, a coved string course, above which is a three-light window, paired two-light bell openings, and an embattled parapet.
Yokefleet Hall; 53.70654°N 0.75257°W		1868–74	A country house in red brick, with stone dressings, decoration in polychromic brick, and a Welsh slate roof. It consists of a main house, with a servants' wing to the west. The main front has two storeys and attics, and three gabled bays, the right bay containing a two-storey canted bay window. The windows have transoms, and the lights are divided by orange sandstone shafts with capitals. The servants' wing has three bays, and contains sash windows.
West Lodge and gateway, Yokefleet Hall; 53.70805°N 0.75572°W		1868–74	The lodge is in polychromic brick, with stone dressings and a Welsh slate roof, with coped gables and kneelers on three fronts. There is a single storey and attics, and an L-shaped plan, with a tower in the angle. In the ground floor of the tower is an arched porch, above which is a stepped eaves course and a pyramidal roof. The windows are casements. To the right is a gateway with wrought iron gates and stone gate piers. The piers have a square section, and each has cross and fleur-de-lys relief on the shafts, moulded capitals, and decorative inscribed finials. Flanking them are curved coped brick walls ending in similar piers.
