= Listed buildings in Laxton, East Riding of Yorkshire =

Laxton is a civil parish in the county of the East Riding of Yorkshire, England. It contains eight listed buildings that are recorded in the National Heritage List for England. Of these, one is listed at Grade II*, the middle of the three grades, and the others are at Grade II, the lowest grade. The parish contains the village of Laxton, the hamlets of Cotness, Metham and Saltmarshe, and the surrounding countryside. Apart from the remaining chancel of a demolished church, all the listed buildings are houses, farmhouses and associated structures.

== Key ==
Grade	Criteria
II*	Particularly important buildings of more than special interest
II	Buildings of national importance and special interest

== Buildings ==
Name and location	Photograph	Date	Notes	Grade
Remains of Old Church; 53.71952°N 0.80042°W		14th century	The church was demolished in about 1876, apart from the chancel. This is in stone and has a Welsh slate roof with stone coped gables and shaped kneelers. There is a single bay, a plain pointed doorway on the west and a lancet window on the north. On the east side is a Decorated window with four lights, flanked by angle buttresses, and above is a blind oculus.	II
Hall Farmhouse; 53.72041°N 0.80483°W	—	Early to mid-18th century	The house is in brick, with a floor band, a dentilled eaves course, and a pantile roof with gable coping and shaped kneelers. There are two storeys and five bays, the middle bay flanked by pilaster strips. The doorway is in the centre, the windows are sashes, and all the openings have flat arches.	II
Church Farm and outbuildings 53.71971°N 0.80189°W	—	Mid-18th century	The farmhouse is in brick with tile roofs. There are two storeys and an L-shaped plan, with two storeys, and attached outbuildings on the left The south front has three bays and a central doorway with a fanlight and a pediment. It is flanked by canted bay windows, above the doorway is a sash window, which is flanked by tripartite sashes with segmental heads. On the east front are a doorway, a bay window and horizontally sliding sash windows.	II
Metham Hall Farmhouse; 53.71303°N 0.77508°W		c. 1800	The farmhouse, which was later extended, is in brick, and has a hipped roof in pantile and Welsh slate. There are two storeys, a square plan, and a west front of three bays. The doorway has a fanlight and a small canopy on consoles, and the windows are sashes under segmental arches.	II
Cotness Hall; 53.70710°N 0.79103°W		Late 18th to early 19th century	The house is in brick, with dentilled eaves and a French tile roof. There are two storeys, an L-shaped plan, and a front of three bays. The doorway has a plain surround and a blocked fanlight, and the windows are casements with segmental heads.	II
Saltmarshe Hall; 53.70634°N 0.81674°W		1825	A country house, later used for other purposes, it was designed by James Pigott Pritchett and Charles Watson. It is in brick faced in stone, on a plinth, with hipped Welsh slate roofs. The main house has two storeys, a square plan, and five bays, and there is a five-bay servants' wing to the west. On the front are steps and a semicircular Tuscan porch, and the windows are sashes, those on the ground floor with aprons. Above is a moulded cornice and overhanging eaves. On the garden front, the three middle bays are narrower and recessed.	II*
Manor House, gates and railings 53.72176°N 0.80717°W		Early 19th century	The house is in brick with a pantile roof. There are two storeys and five bays, the middle bay projecting slightly, and a rear cross-wing. The central doorway has a Doric surround, with columns and a pediment. The windows have four panes under segmental arches. Along the front of the garden are cast iron railings with ornamental finials on a low coped wall, and gate posts have ball finials.	II
Metham Hall; 53.71250°N 0.77433°W	—	Early 19th century	The house is in brick, with stone dressings, a timber cornice, and hipped Westmorland slate roofs. There are two storeys and four bays, the right bay narrower. The entrance on the left return has a Tuscan porch, a radial fanlight and a pediment. The windows are sashes with cambered channelled wedge lintels and keystones.	II
