= Sandholme, East Riding of Yorkshire =

Hamlet in the East Riding of Yorkshire, England

Coordinates: 53.766700°N 0.744727°W

Sandholme
- Location within the East Riding of Yorkshire
- OS grid reference: SE828307
- Civil parish: Gilberdyke
- Unitary authority: East Riding of Yorkshire
- Ceremonial county: East Riding of Yorkshire
- Region: Yorkshire and the Humber
- Country: England
- Sovereign state: United Kingdom
- Post town: BROUGH
- Postcode district: HU15
- Dialling code: 01430
- Police: Humberside
- Fire: Humberside
- Ambulance: Yorkshire
- UK Parliament: Goole and Pocklington

Sandholme is a hamlet in the East Riding of Yorkshire, England. It is situated approximately 8 miles (13 km) west of Brough and 7 miles (11 km) north-east of Goole. It lies just to the north of the M62 motorway.

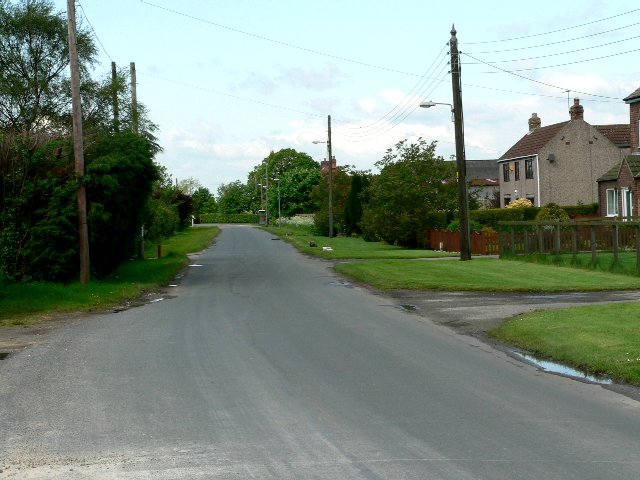
Old Trough Lane, Sandholme

It forms part of the civil parish of Gilberdyke. It was previously served by a railway station on the Hull and Barnsley Line before it was decommissioned in 1955. The station house stood until 2012, when it was demolished after being destroyed by fire.
