= Metham =

Hamlet in the East Riding of Yorkshire, England

Coordinates: 53.716320°N 0.775322°W

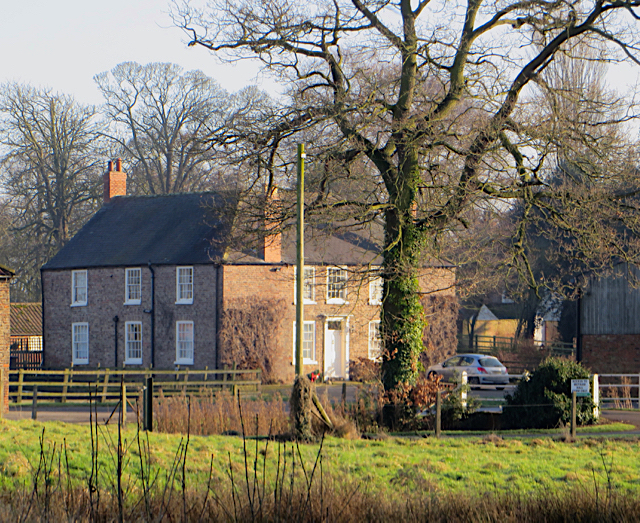
- Metham Hall Farm

- Location within the East Riding of Yorkshire
- OS grid reference: SE809251
  - London: 155 mi (249 km) S
- Civil parish: Laxton
- Unitary authority: East Riding of Yorkshire
- Ceremonial county: East Riding of Yorkshire
- Region: Yorkshire and the Humber
- Country: England
- Sovereign state: United Kingdom
- Post town: GOOLE
- Postcode district: DN14
- Dialling code: 01430
- Police: Humberside
- Fire: Humberside
- Ambulance: Yorkshire
- UK Parliament: Goole and Pocklington

Metham is a hamlet in the civil parish of Laxton, in the East Riding of Yorkshire, England. It is situated approximately 3 miles (5 km) south east of Howden and 19 miles (31 km) south east of York. It lies 1.5 miles (2.4 km) north of the River Ouse, downstream from York, Selby and Goole.

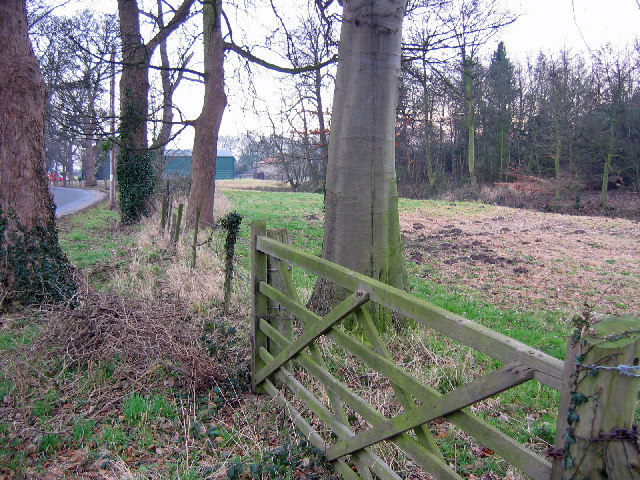
Metham Hall

== History ==
The name Metham derives from the Old English mǣtehām meaning 'mean village', in the sense of 'low quality/poor'. This refers to the land formerly being marshy wasteland.

Metham was the seat of the Metham family. A 16th-century Sir Thomas Metham, who was knighted during the reign of Queen Mary, was imprisoned under Queen Elizabeth I for practicing the Roman Catholic faith, and died at nearby York Castle in 1573. A 17th-century Sir Thomas Metham died at the Battle of Marston Moor during First English Civil War. In the battle he served for Charles I as captain of the Yorkshire gentlemen volunteers.

In 1823 Metham was a village in the civil parish of Howden, and the Wapentake of Howdenshire. The population of Metham in 1823 was 45, and included one farmer; two gentlemen, one of whom lived at Metham Hall; and two yeomen, one of whom lived at 'Bishopsoil'.

The hamlet is about 1 mile (1.6 km) from a Roman military highway, Roman pottery and other artifacts have been found nearby.

Metham was formerly a township in the parish of Howden, in 1866 Metham became a separate civil parish, on 1 April 1935 the parish was abolished and merged with Laxton, Eastrington and Howden. In 1931 the parish had a population of 49.

While the Metham Estate has existed for centuries prior, the current Metham Hall is on Metham Lane, and is a Grade II listed building and is of early 19th century origin. A Grade II listed farmhouse (c. 1800), in the grounds of Metham Hall, is 70 yards (64 m) to its north-west.

== See also ==
- Listed buildings in Laxton, East Riding of Yorkshire
