= Scalby, East Riding of Yorkshire =

Hamlet in the East Riding of Yorkshire, England

Coordinates: 53.756094°N 0.727752°W

Scalby
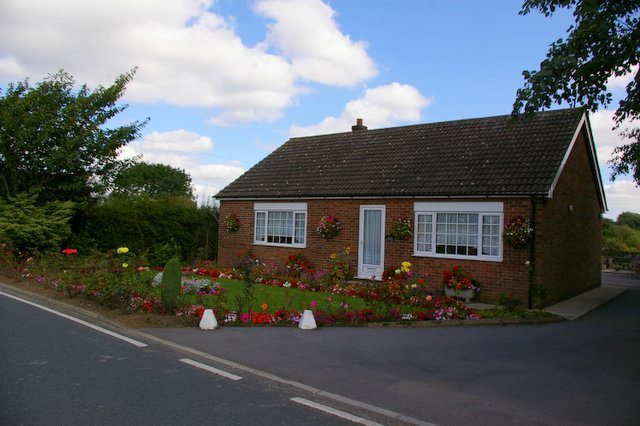
- Bungalow at Scalby

- Location within the East Riding of Yorkshire
- OS grid reference: SE839296
- Civil parish: Gilberdyke
- Unitary authority: East Riding of Yorkshire
- Ceremonial county: East Riding of Yorkshire
- Region: Yorkshire and the Humber
- Country: England
- Sovereign state: United Kingdom
- Post town: BROUGH
- Postcode district: HU15
- Dialling code: 01430
- Police: Humberside
- Fire: Humberside
- Ambulance: Yorkshire
- UK Parliament: Goole and Pocklington

Scalby is a hamlet in the civil parish of Gilberdyke, in the East Riding of Yorkshire, England. It is situated approximately 7 miles (11 km) west of Brough and 7 miles (11 km) north-east of Goole. It lies on the B1230 road.

Historically in the wapentake of Howdenshire, it is now represented at Parliament as part of the Goole and Pocklington constituency.

The name is from the same form as Scalby in North Yorkshire; Skalle-by, with Skalle being a personal name. Skalle is Old Norse and by means farm or farmstead.

Scalby was formerly a township in the parish of Blacktoft, in 1866 Scalby became a separate civil parish, on 1 April 1935 the parish was abolished and merged with Blacktoft, part also went to form Gilberdyke and Newport. In 1931 the parish had a population of 160.
