= Eastrington railway station =

Railway station in the East Riding of Yorkshire, England

Eastrington
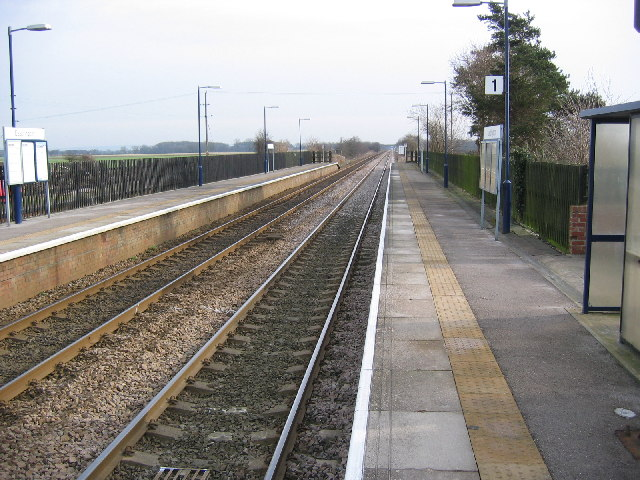

General information
- Location: Eastrington, East Riding of Yorkshire; England
- Coordinates: 53.75500°N 0.78500°W
- Grid reference: SE800294
- Manager: Northern
- Platforms: 2

Other information
- Station code: EGN
- Classification: DfT category F2

History
- Opened: 1840

Passengers
- 2021/22: ▲3,844
- 2022/23: ▼1,660
- 2023/24: ▲4,784
- 2024/25: ▼3,378
- 2025/26: ▲10,414
Location
Notes
- Passenger statistics from the Office of Rail and Road

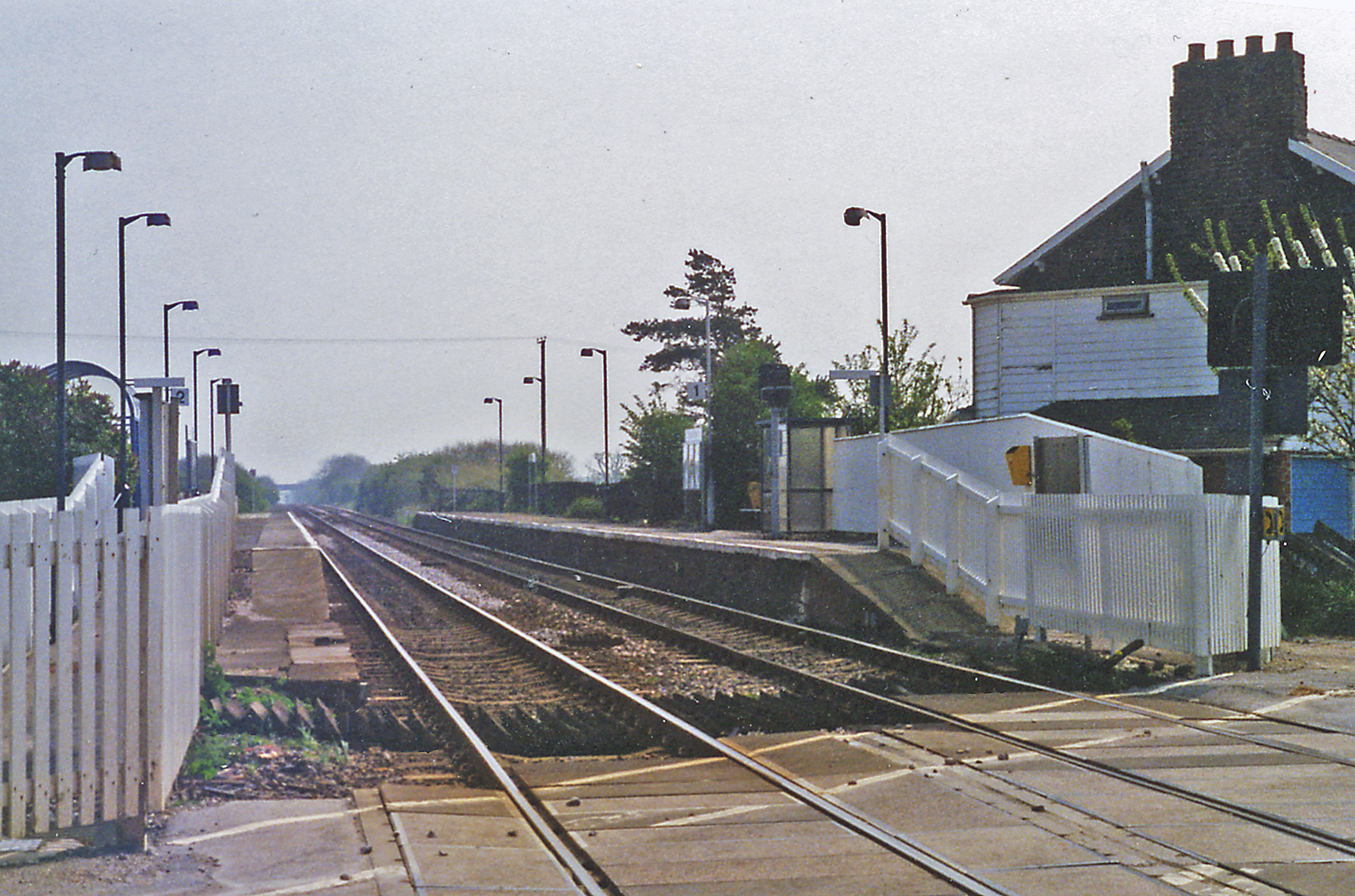
From the level crossing

Eastrington railway station serves the small village of Eastrington in the East Riding of Yorkshire, England. The station is 19 1/4 miles (31 km) west of Hull on the Selby Line. The station, and all trains serving it, are operated by Northern.

== History ==
The station was opened 1 July 1840 by the Hull and Selby Railway. It was renamed on 1 July 1922 to "South Eastrington", as the village was also served by another station, known as "North Eastrington" on the now-disused Hull and Barnsley Railway. It was renamed back to Eastrington on 12 June 1961.

== Facilities ==
The station is unstaffed and has no permanent buildings other than basic shelters (the former station house is now a private residence). No ticketing facilities are offered, so all tickets must be bought on the train or prior to travel. Train running information can be obtained from timetable posters or a public telephone on platform 2. Step-free access is available to both platforms via the automatic barrier level crossing at the western end.

== Service ==
There is a very limited service from Eastrington, with one train a day eastbound to Hull and four trains a day westbound to York. There is no Sunday service.

Preceding station	National Rail	Following station
Howden	Northern; Selby Line; Mondays-Saturdays only	Gilberdyke
