= St Peter's Church, Laxton =

Church in Laxton, East Riding of Yorkshire, England

Coordinates: 53°43′12″N 0°48′01″W

The church, in 2008

St Peter's Church is the parish church of Laxton, East Riding of Yorkshire, a village in England.

The church was built between 1875 and 1876, to a Decorated Gothic design by Matthew Ellison Hadfield, at a cost of £3,360. It replaced Old St Peter's Church, Laxton, the remains of which lie across the road. On completion, it could seat nearly 300 worshippers. In about 1910, an oak screen was erected in the church, in memory of the Reverend Edward Whitmore Simpson.

The church is built of stone, with a tiled roof. It consists of a nave, chancel, north vestry and south porch and has a bellcote. Inside, there is a pulpit carved from pink and grey marble. There are numerous stained glass windows, including an east window designed by John Ward Knowles in 1876 and south chancel window by him which was completed in 1882, the latter depicting a woman having a vision of being taken up by angels.
