= North Eastrington railway station =

Disused railway station in the East Riding of Yorkshire, England

North Eastrington

General information
- Location: Eastrington, East Riding of Yorkshire; England
- Coordinates: 53.762500°N 0.794000°W
- Grid reference: SE795302
- Platforms: 2

Other information
- Status: Disused

History
- Original company: Hull, Barnsley and West Riding Junction Railway
- Pre-grouping: Hull and Barnsley Railway
- Post-grouping: London and North Eastern Railway

Key dates
- 27 July 1885: Opened as Eastrington
- 1 July 1922: Renamed North Eastrington
- 1 August 1955: Closed
Location

North Eastrington railway station was a station on the Hull and Barnsley Railway that served the village of Eastrington in the East Riding of Yorkshire, England.

It opened on 27 July 1885 as Eastrington and was renamed North Eastrington on 1 July 1922. It closed on 1 August 1955.

Preceding station	Disused railways	Following station
South Howden	Hull and Barnsley Railway	Sandholme
