= Saltmarshe =

Hamlet in the East Riding of Yorkshire, England

Coordinates: 53.707862°N 0.805565°W

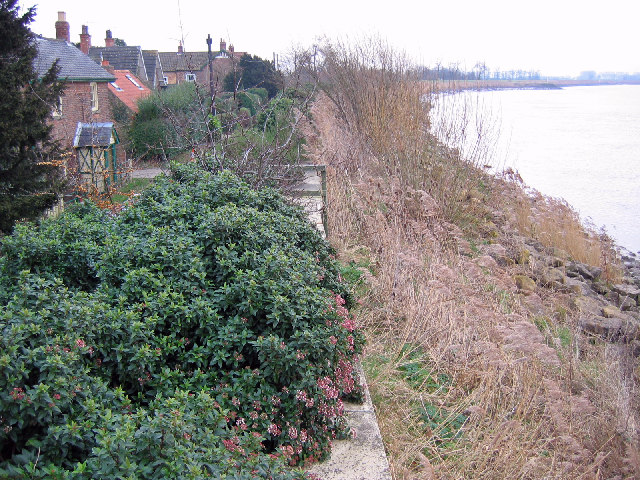
- Saltmarshe, looking down the Ouse

- Location within the East Riding of Yorkshire
- OS grid reference: SE789241
- Civil parish: Laxton
- Unitary authority: East Riding of Yorkshire
- Ceremonial county: East Riding of Yorkshire
- Region: Yorkshire and the Humber
- Country: England
- Sovereign state: United Kingdom
- Post town: GOOLE
- Postcode district: DN14
- Dialling code: 01430
- Police: Humberside
- Fire: Humberside
- Ambulance: Yorkshire
- UK Parliament: Goole and Pocklington

Saltmarshe is a hamlet and former civil parish, now in the parish of Laxton, in the East Riding of Yorkshire, England. It is situated on the north bank of the River Ouse, downstream from York, Selby and Goole. Saltmarshe is approximately 3 miles (5 km) south-east from Howden and 21 miles (34 km) south-east from York. In 1931 the parish had a population of 82.

Saltmarshe lies within the Parliamentary constituency of Goole and Pocklington.

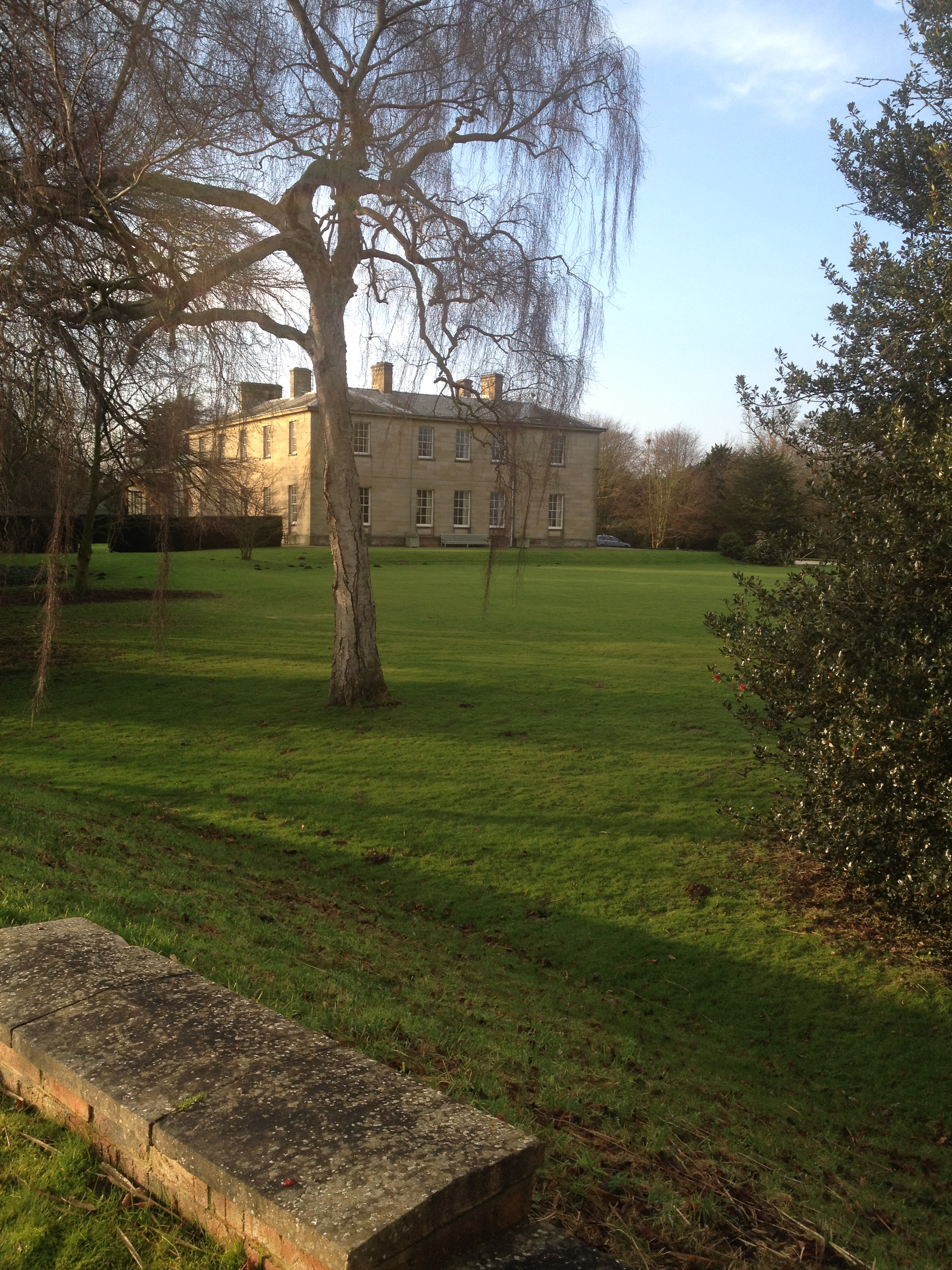
Saltmarshe Hall

Saltmarshe Hall is a Grade II* listed 19th-century country house on the western edge of the hamlet.

Saltmarshe railway station is on the Sheffield to Hull Line. It is named after Saltmarshe, but is 1 mile (1.6 km) to the north near the village of Laxton.

== Civil parish ==
Saltmarshe was formerly a township in the parish of Howden, from 1866 Saltmarshe was a civil parish in its own right, on 1 April 1935 the parish was abolished and merged with Laxton and Howden.

== See also ==
- Listed buildings in Laxton, East Riding of Yorkshire
