= Listed buildings in Gilberdyke =

Gilberdyke is a civil parish in the county of the East Riding of Yorkshire, England. It contains three listed buildings that are recorded in the National Heritage List for England. All the listed buildings are designated at Grade II, the lowest of the three grades, which is applied to "buildings of national importance and special interest". The parish contains the village of Gilberdyke and the surrounding countryside, and the listed buildings consist of two houses and a public house.

== Buildings ==
Name and location	Photograph	Date	Notes
The Cross Keys; 53.75433°N 0.74218°W		Mid to late 18th century	The public house is in painted brick, with a floor band, a stepped eaves course, and a hipped Welsh slate roof. There are two storeys and three bays. The central doorway has a fanlight, it is flanked by casement windows, and on the upper floor is a central blocked window and sashes. All the openings have wedge lintels with keystones.
Blacktoft Grange; 53.77232°N 0.73658°W	—	Late 18th century	The house, which was later extended, is in colourwashed brick, with dentilled eaves courses, and a Welsh slate roof hipped on the right. There are two storeys, the original range has three bays, and to the right is a taller two-bay extension. The doorway on the right wing has pilasters, a radial fanlight and a pediment. On the original range is a blocked doorway with a segmental arch, and a canted bay window. The windows are sashes, most with segmental arches, and on the east front is a two-storey canted bay window.
Crumble Manor; 53.74887°N 0.74980°W		Late 18th century	The house, which was later extended, is in brick, with a dentilled cornice, and a pantile roof with gable coping and shaped kneelers. There are two storeys, a main block of three bays, and a lower single-bay wing on the right. The doorway has a divided fanlight, the windows are sashes, and the ground floor openings are under segmental arches.
