= Faxfleet Preceptory =

Former monastery in Yorkshire, England

Coordinates: 53.7509°N 0.6856°W

The Faxfleet Preceptory is a former community of the Knights Templar located in what is now the East Riding of Yorkshire, England. It stood on lands which are now part of Thorpe Grange Farm and are largely buried under a field to the west of the farm known today as Temple Garth. The location is west of Kingston upon Hull, approximately 20 miles (32 km) south of Youlthorpe and 25 miles (40 km) south-west of Beswick.

== History ==
Faxfleet was one of Yorkshire's greatest preceptories, originally built upon land provided in 1185 by the Crusader knight, Roger de Mowbray, Lord of Northumberland. De Mowbray had been ransomed by the Templars from the Turks who were holding him prisoner. In that year it is recorded that Odo, Serlo, Gille, Stephen, Harvat and Ucca were Templars tenants, each farming 2 acres (8,100 m^{2}) of land under the strip farming system. In 1290 Geoffrey Jolif was preceptor, or commander, of the Knights Templar at Faxfleet (until 1301) and Robert de Halton was master of the bailiwick of the Temple in the same county.

In 1308, several persons, although not Jolif, were arrested at Faxfleet, were sent to York, and were eventually sentenced to do penitence in the Cistercian Order.

The preceptory was closed in 1308 and was valued at that time at over £290 (equivalent to £280,000 in 2025).
