= Gilberdyke railway station =

Railway station in the East Riding of Yorkshire, England

Gilberdyke
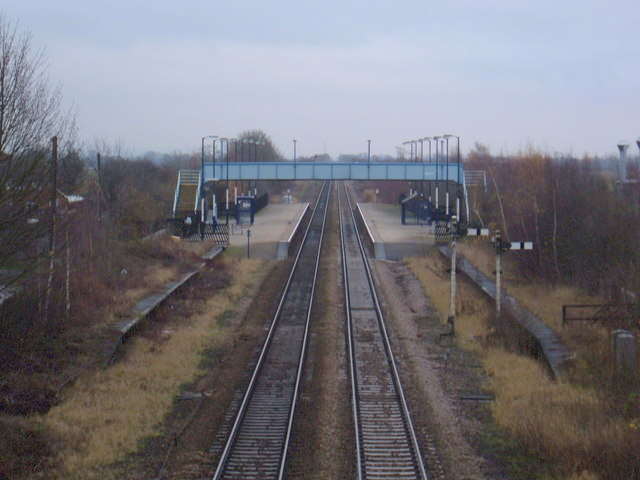
- The station in 2009

General information
- Location: Gilberdyke, East Riding of Yorkshire; England
- Coordinates: 53.7479°N 0.7300°W
- Grid reference: SE837286
- Managed by: Northern
- Platforms: 2

Other information
- Station code: GBD
- Classification: DfT category F2

History
- Opened: 1840

Passengers
- 2020/21: ▼12,278
- Interchange: ▼104
- 2021/22: ▲46,004
- Interchange: ▲466
- 2022/23: ▲54,998
- Interchange: ▲678
- 2023/24: ▲65,118
- Interchange: ▲1,176
- 2024/25: ▲76,958
- Interchange: ▼899
Location
Notes
- Passenger statistics from the Office of Rail and Road

Gilberdyke railway station is a railway station that serves the village of Gilberdyke in the East Riding of Yorkshire, England. It was opened in 1840 by the Hull and Selby Railway, and until 1974 it was known as Staddlethorpe station. Today it is operated by the Northern train operating company. Situated 17 miles (27 km) west of Hull, it is the junction for the lines to Selby and to Goole and Doncaster.

== History ==
Staddlethorpe station was opened by the Hull and Selby Railway in 1840. The original facilities included a water station, with a 1,250,000 imperial gallons (5,700 m^{3}) reservoir and pumping engine.

In 1842 a train guard slipped in wet weather, falling off the platform under moving coal wagons, resulting in very serious injuries leading to his death. In 1850 a train from Hull to Normanton had one of its engine's boilers explode near the station. Both the driver and fireman were badly scalded, and the fireman broke a leg.

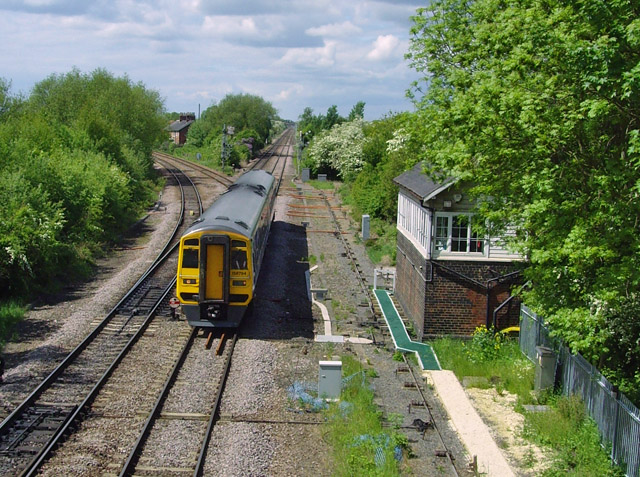
Staddlethorpe junction in May 2008 (opened 1869)

In 1869 the Hull and Doncaster Branch opened, branching south-westwards from a junction just west of the station.

At around the end of the 19th century a goods shed, and sidings serving a creosote works were established south of the station. In the same period the line through here and on towards Brough was increased to four tracks. The reservoir was filled in during 1903. In 1987, the platform loop lines were removed (reducing the line to two tracks again) and the platforms themselves extended outwards to reach the remaining running lines.

The works and area south of the station was redeveloped as an industrial estate in the 1970.

In 2006 a planning application was accepted for the demolition of the goods shed and the erection of three industrial units split into eighteen smaller business units.

== Present ==
Railway buildings that still exist include the Station Master's house and two adjacent cottages, and, on Broad Lane, a number of terraced cottages known as Station Cottages. The sidings south of the station have been replaced by an industrial estate "Gateway Business Park".

The station is now an unstaffed halt and has no ticketing facilities – passengers must purchase these on the train or prior to travel. Shelters are located on each platform, along with digital information screens. Train running details can also be obtained by telephone and timetable posters.

The station does not have step free access to the westbound platform (as it is accessible only via footbridge), meaning that disabled passengers should book assistance in advance or travel via Brough station where step free access is available.

=== Services ===
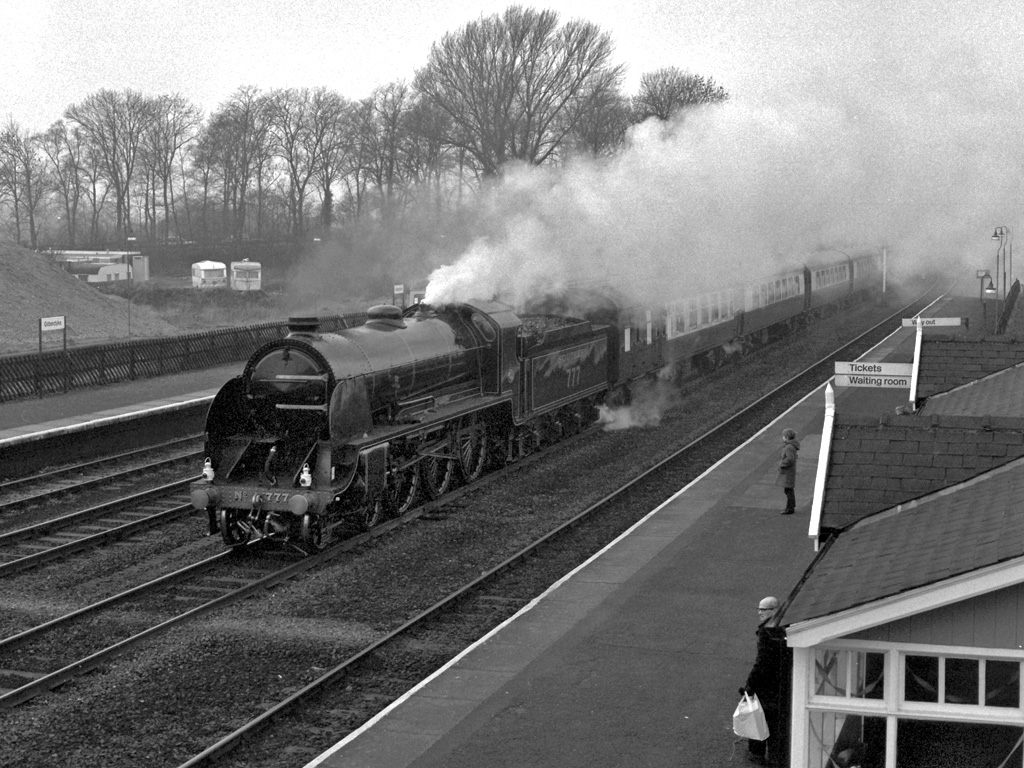
Southern Railway 'N-15/King Arthur' at Gilberdyke station with a charter train prior to the station remodelling (1982)

The station is operated by Northern. The station is served hourly in each direction on weekdays by local trains between Hull and Doncaster and by the York to Hull and Bridlington via Selby service, along with a limited service (one departure per day) to Leeds and Liverpool Lime Street operated by TransPennine Express. This is the 1K04 service leaving Hull at 04:59, Mondays to Saturdays, calling at Gilberdyke at 05:18 in the spring 2025 timetable. A limited number of Doncaster trains also continue through to Sheffield in the a.m. peak and late evening.

On Sundays, the main service is provided by the Hull to Doncaster trains, though two York services also stop – one in the morning and the second around noon.

Preceding station	National Rail	Following station
Eastrington	Northern Selby Line	Broomfleet
Saltmarshe	Northern; Hull and Doncaster Branch; Mondays–Saturdays only	Broomfleet
Howden	TransPennine Express; North TransPennine	Brough
Selby; Sundays only	TransPennine Express; North TransPennine	Brough
