= Endowment =

Endowment may refer to:

== Finance ==
- Financial endowment, pertaining to funds or property donated to institutions or individuals (e.g., college endowment)
- Endowment mortgage, a mortgage to be repaid by an endowment policy
- Endowment policy, a type of life insurance policy
- A synonym for budget constraint, the total funds available for spending

== Economics ==
- Endowment effect, a cognitive bias
- Endowment, a term used for land reclamation
- Endowment of natural or other resources that can become capital by the process of production
- Factor endowment

== Other ==
- Endowment (philosophy); as a philosophical term
- Endowment (Latter Day Saints); a temple ceremony that confers heavenly priesthood power in Mormon theology
- Endowment (Mormonism)
- A term for when one person's traits are magically transferred to another in the Runelords saga
