= Thomas Metham =

Sir Thomas Metham (died 1573 in York Castle) was an English Roman Catholic knight, imprisoned with his second wife for their beliefs.

== Life ==
Metham was the eldest son of Thomas Metham, of Metham, Yorkshire, by his marriage to Grace, a daughter of Thomas Pudsey, of Barford and Bolton. He married twice: first to Dorothy, daughter of George, Baron Darcy of Aston, and then to Edith, daughter of Nicholas Palmes of Naburn. Metham was knighted on 2 October 1553, the day after the coronation of Queen Mary I. Through George, his second son by his first wife, he was the grandfather of Thomas Metham, S.J., one of the Dilati, who died in 1592.

By 16 August 1565, Sir Thomas and his second wife had been imprisoned "for contempt of Her Majesty's ordinances concerning the administration of divine service and the sacraments".

On 6 February 1569–70 an unknown correspondent wrote to Sir William Cecil from York:

We have here Sir Thomas Metham, a most wilful papist, who utterly refuses to come to service, receive the Communion or read any books except approved by the Church of Rome, or to be conferred with at all. He refuses to be tried before the Commissioners for causes ecclesiastical; he uses the corrupt Louvaine books, and maintains at Louvaine two of his sons, with whom he corresponds. It is four years since he and Dame Edith, his wife, were first committed to ward, since which he has daily grown more wealthy, and wilful, and now seems utterly incorrigible. He does much hurt here, and is reverenced by the papists as a pillar of their faith. I caused him to be committed to the Castle, where he remains and does harm, yet would have done more if he had lived at large. If you would be a means of his removal, you would take away a great occasion of evil in these parts.

Metham died in York Castle in 1573. Some years later, in 1587, his widow was still a recusant.
