= Laxton, East Riding of Yorkshire =

Village and civil parish in the East Riding of Yorkshire, England

Coordinates: 53°43′15″N 0°48′10″W

Laxton
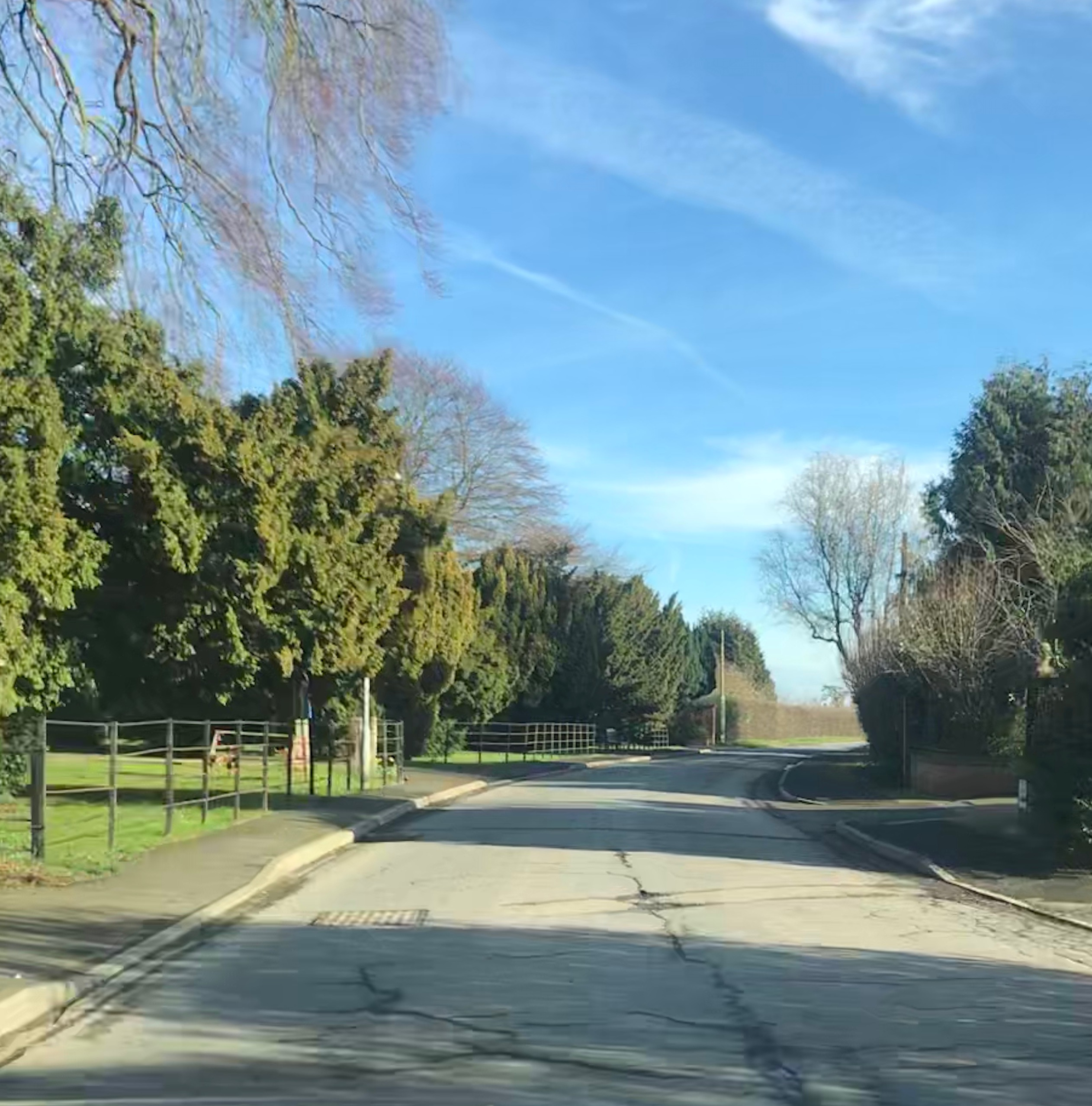
- Chapel Lane, outside St Peter's Church

- Location within the East Riding of Yorkshire
- Population: 314 (2011 census)
- OS grid reference: SE790256
  - London: 155 mi (249 km) S
- Civil parish: Laxton
- Unitary authority: East Riding of Yorkshire
- Ceremonial county: East Riding of Yorkshire
- Region: Yorkshire and the Humber
- Country: England
- Sovereign state: United Kingdom
- Post town: GOOLE
- Postcode district: DN14
- Dialling code: 01430
- Police: Humberside
- Fire: Humberside
- Ambulance: Yorkshire
- UK Parliament: Goole and Pocklington

Laxton is a village and civil parish in the East Riding of Yorkshire, England. The village is situated approximately 2 miles (3 km) east from Howden and 19 miles (31 km) south-east from the county town of York.

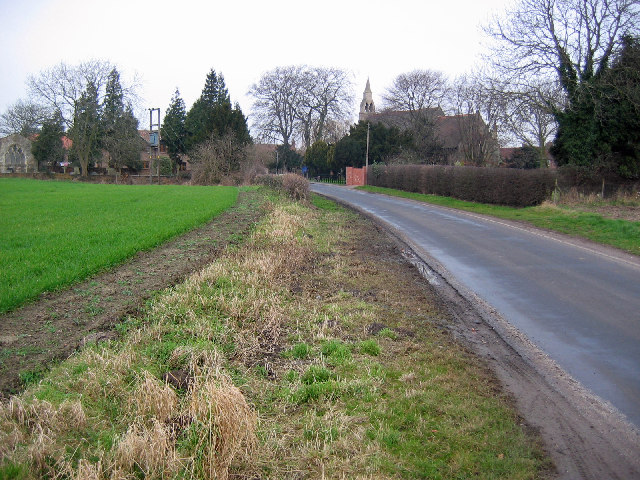
Laxton village

The civil parish is formed by the village of Laxton and the hamlets of Cotness, Metham and Saltmarshe. A very small part of Yokefleet also falls within the parish. According to the 2011 UK census, Laxton parish had a population of 314, a reduction on the 2001 UK census figure of 322.

Laxton lies within the Parliamentary constituency of Goole and Pocklington.

The village is served by Saltmarshe railway station on the Sheffield to Hull Line.

The name Laxton derives from the Old English Laxaingtūn meaning 'settlement connected with Laxa'.

In 1823 Laxton was in the civil parish of Howden, and in the Wapentake and Liberty of Howdenshire. Population at the time was 268. Occupations included seven farmers, two carpenters, a corn miller, a tailor, a shopkeeper, a shoemaker, a schoolmaster and public house landlords of the White Horse; the Mason's Arms, who was also a bricklayer; and the Cross Keys, who was also a blacksmith. Resident was the ecclesiastical parish curate and a Philip Saltmarshe, Esquire of Saltmarshe.

== See also ==
- Listed buildings in Laxton, East Riding of Yorkshire
