= Gilberdyke =

Village and civil parish in the East Riding of Yorkshire, England

Coordinates: 53.751957°N 0.736066°W

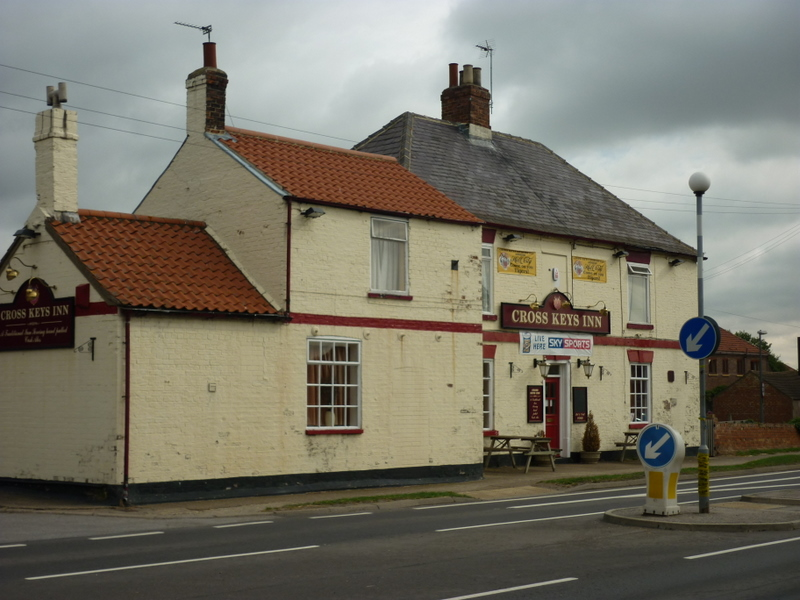
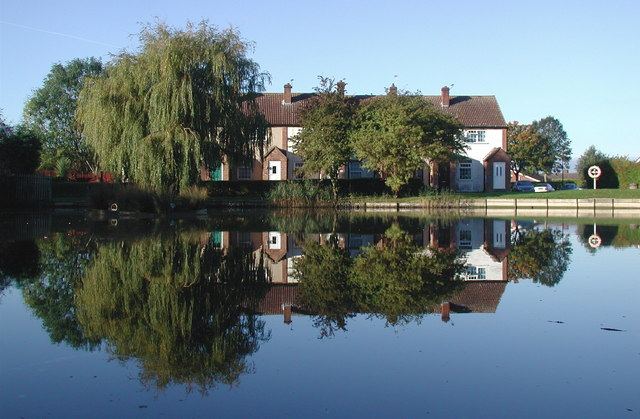
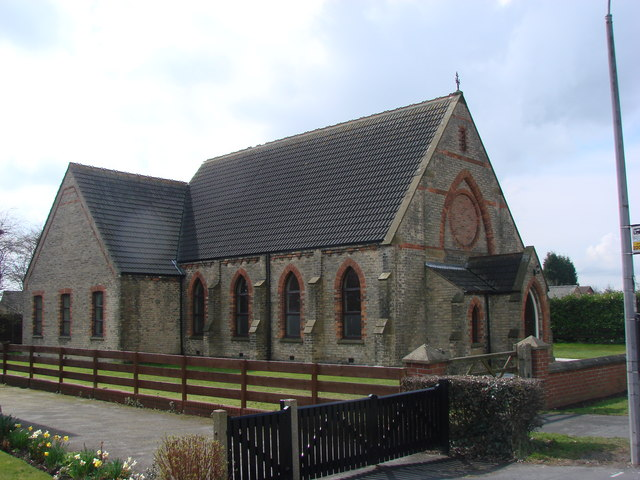
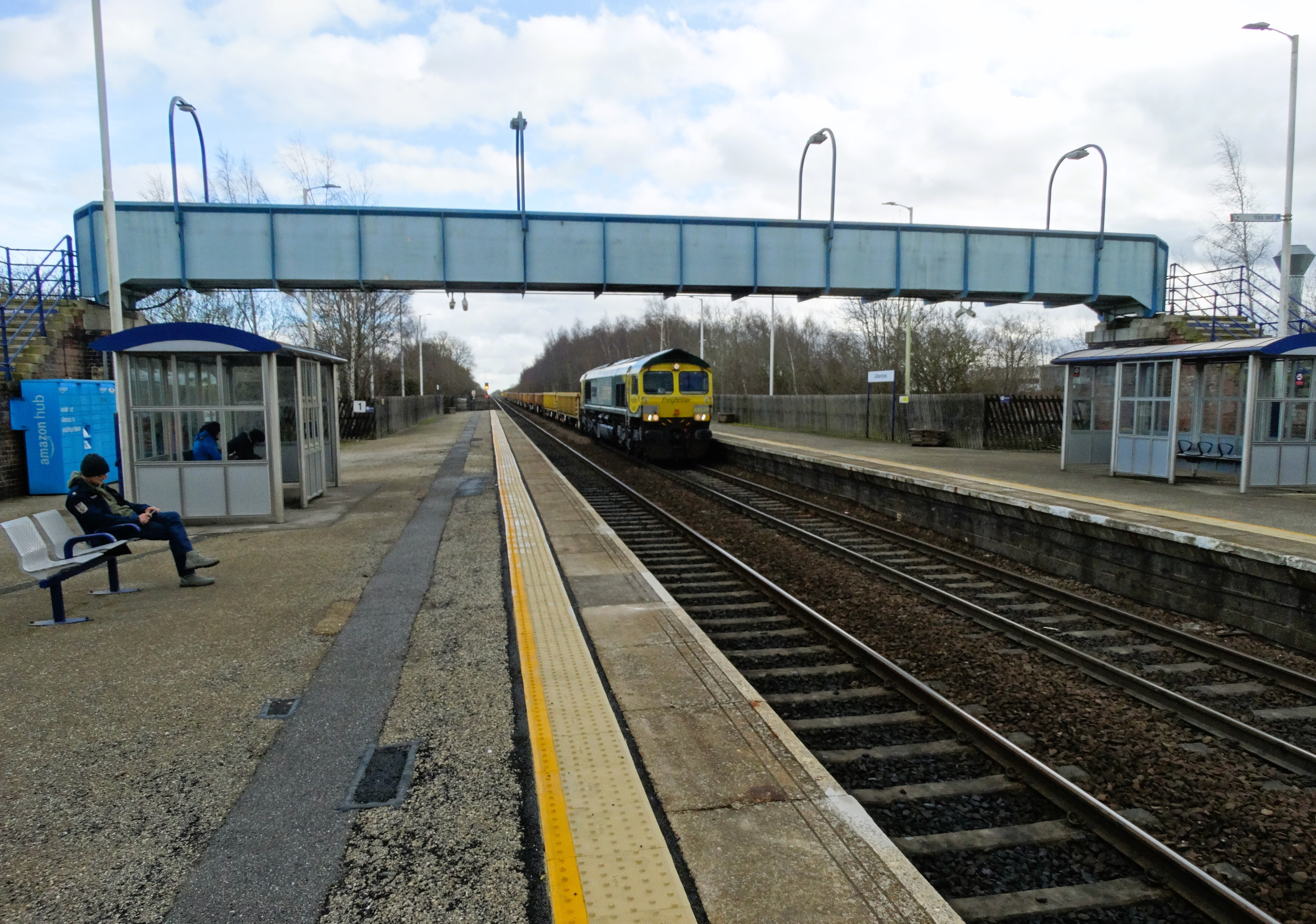
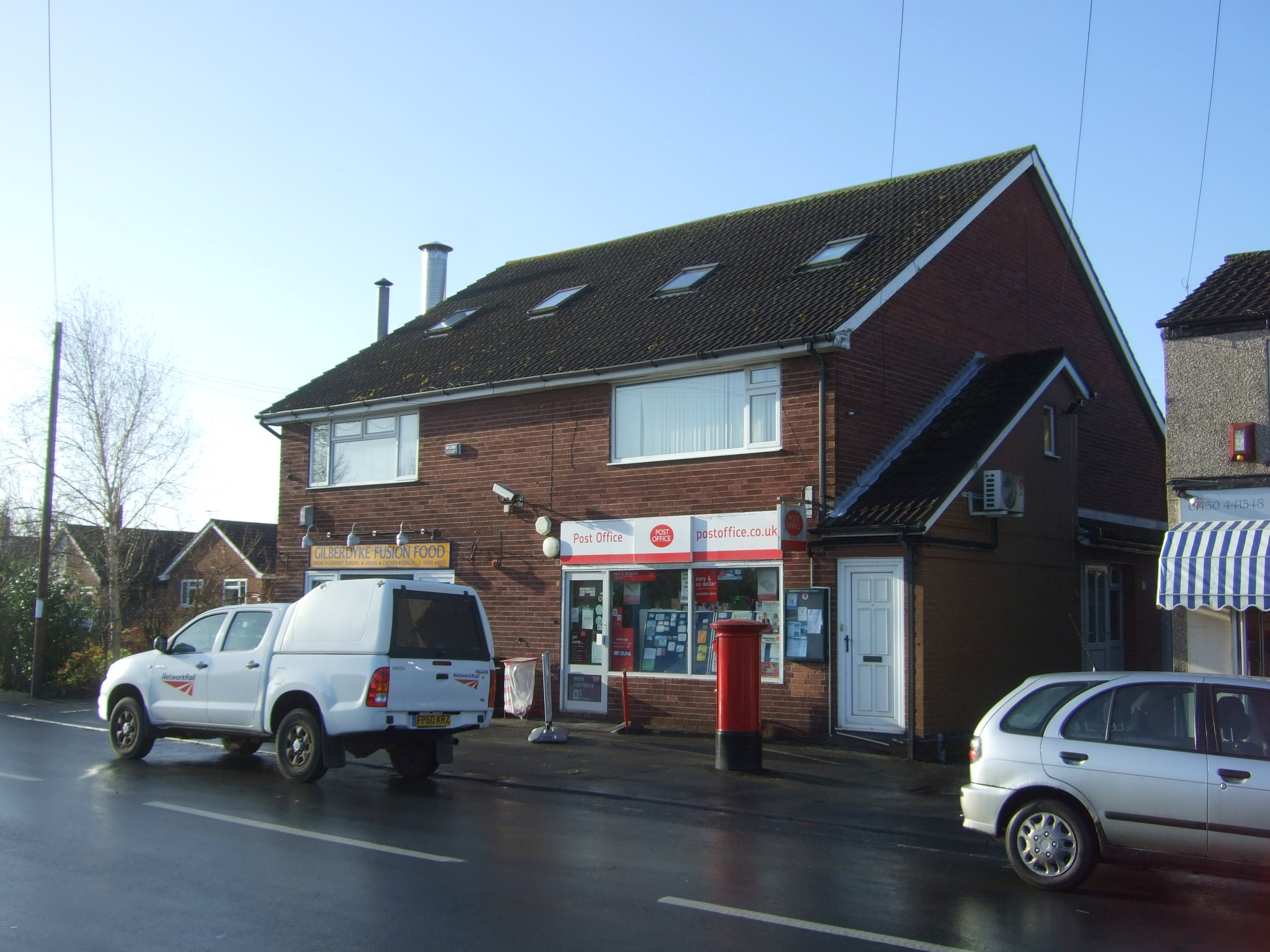
- The Cross Keys Jubilee Pond Methodist Church Railway Station Post Office

- Location within the East Riding of Yorkshire
- Population: 3,430 (2011 census)
- OS grid reference: SE834291
  - London: 155 mi (249 km) S
- Civil parish: Gilberdyke
- Unitary authority: East Riding of Yorkshire
- Ceremonial county: East Riding of Yorkshire
- Region: Yorkshire and the Humber
- Country: England
- Sovereign state: United Kingdom
- Post town: BROUGH
- Postcode district: HU15
- Dialling code: 01430
- Police: Humberside
- Fire: Humberside
- Ambulance: Yorkshire
- UK Parliament: Goole and Pocklington

Gilberdyke is a village and civil parish in the East Riding of Yorkshire, England. It is situated approximately 20 miles (32 km) south-east of York and 19 miles (31 km) west of Hull. Gilberdyke lies near to Howden which is 5 miles (8 km) away. It lies on the B1230 road, 1 mile (2 km) south of the M62 motorway. The civil parish is formed by the village of Gilberdyke and the hamlets of Bennetland, Hive, Sandholme and Scalby. According to the 2011 UK Census, Gilberdyke parish had a population of 3,430, an increase on the 2001 UK Census figure of 3,028. The village is served by Gilberdyke railway station with trains operating between Scarborough/Bridlington via Hull to Doncaster and Sheffield, and between Hull and Selby/York.

The village was recorded as simply 'Dyc' in 1234 and 'Dyke' in 1336; 'Gilberdyke' was first mentioned in 1349, and 'Gilbertdike' in 1376. Who 'Gilbert' refers to is unknown.

In 1823, Gilberdyke was in the parish of Eastrington, the Wapentake of Holderness, and the Liberty of St Peter. Population, including the settlements of Hive and Sandholm[e], was 640. Occupations at the time included four farmers, two blacksmiths, two carpenters, a shoemaker, a corn miller, a constable, a schoolmaster, an overseer, and the licensed victualler of The Cross Keys public house.

Current Asking Alexandria and We Are Harlot vocalist Danny Worsnop grew up here.

The village is also the homeplace of Chihiro Fujisaki a fictional character in the video game Danganronpa

In the year 2026 Gilberdyke has a collection of new buildings including a Garden center, Pizza place, Deli, Primary school, auction house and a park. The auction house was originally a second pub before 2026.

== See also ==
- Listed buildings in Gilberdyke
