= Eastrington =

Village and civil parish in the East Riding of Yorkshire, England

Coordinates: 53°45′38″N 0°47′37″W

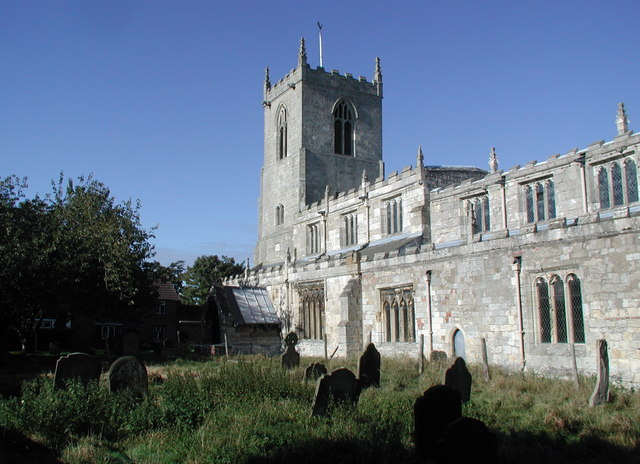
- St Michael’s Church, Eastrington

- Location within the East Riding of Yorkshire
- Population: 1,147 (2011 census)
- OS grid reference: SE796299
- Civil parish: Eastrington
- Unitary authority: East Riding of Yorkshire
- Ceremonial county: East Riding of Yorkshire
- Region: Yorkshire and the Humber
- Country: England
- Sovereign state: United Kingdom
- Post town: GOOLE
- Postcode district: DN14
- Dialling code: 01430
- Police: Humberside
- Fire: Humberside
- Ambulance: Yorkshire
- UK Parliament: Goole and Pocklington

Eastrington is a small village and civil parish in the East Riding of Yorkshire, England. It is situated approximately 3 miles (5 km) to the east of Howden and 17 miles (27 km) south east of York.

The civil parish is formed by the village of Eastrington and the hamlets of Newland, Owsthorpe and Portington. According to the 2011 UK Census, Eastrington parish had a population of 1,147, an increase on the 2001 UK Census figure of 880. Eastrington lies within the Parliamentary constituency of Goole and Pocklington.

The name Eastrington derives from the Old English ēastoringastūn meaning 'settlement of the easterners', referring to the village's position east of Howden.

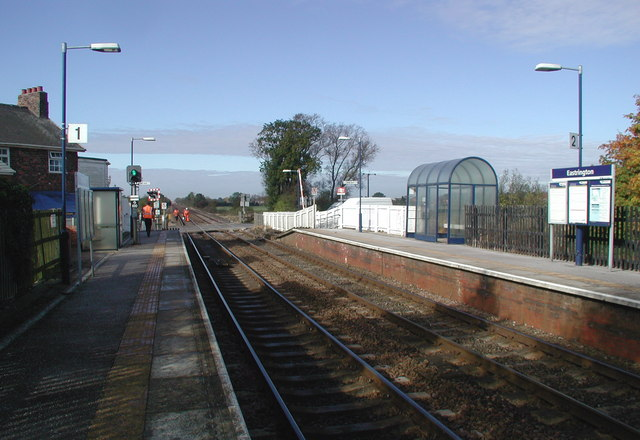
Eastrington Railway Station

The village is served by Eastrington railway station (formerly "South Eastrington") on the Hull to Selby railway line, and was historically also served by North Eastrington railway station on the Hull and Barnsley Railway.

Nearby Eastrington Ponds was designated a Local Nature Reserve in 2002 by the East Riding of Yorkshire Council. The village is served by a local shop and the Black Swan public house.

In 1823 Eastrington was in the Wapentake and liberty of Howdenshire. At the time the King was the patron of Eastrington's Church of St Michael. A Methodist chapel and a free school existed. The village had a population of 375, with occupations including six carpenters, four farmers, two shopkeepers, a shoemaker, a blacksmith, a corn miller, a tailor, and the landlord of the Bay Horse public house. Also directory-listed was a school master and a yeoman.

== St Michael's Church ==
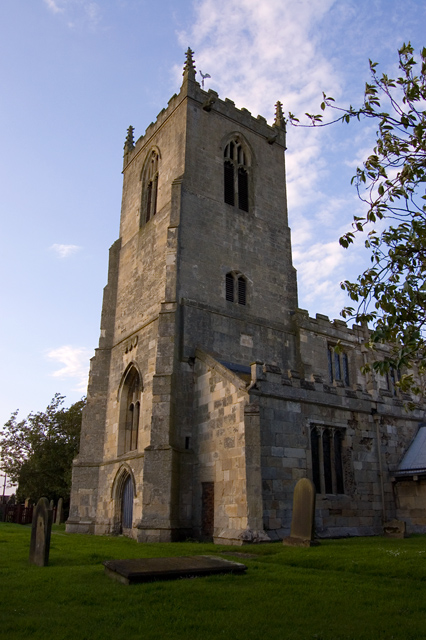
St Michael's Church

St Michael's Church, Eastrington is at the centre of the village. A church at Eastrington is mentioned in the Domesday Book of 1086, listed as part of the Howden manor, and in 1146 Eastrington was specifically mentioned as a chapel of Howden. Architecturally the church is a mixture of historical influences. The present chancel was probably in the original chapel. The walls are Norman with chamfered string courses both inside and out, as are the carved stone inside the building, steps on which the font stands and the gargoyles. Surviving records from accounts at Durham suggest that monks paid for some of the early medieval building work, while the north and south aisles were later additions and probably paid for by three local families – the Askes, Kayvills (or Cavilles) and Portingtons. In the Portington chapel, a "coffin-shaped cross slab with lead-filled design" can be found on the floor dated from the early 13th century, as can a second cross slab carved in relief, dated from the late 13th century. There is a shield below the cross head, probably the Caville coat of arms.

Architectural evidence suggests that much of St Michael's Church building surviving today was built during the 14th century. The windows of the chapel are typical of the 14th century, and a tombstone recorded as being in the church in 1584 was inscribed with the words "Orate pro animabus Nicholai de Portington, militis, qui istam capellam fieri fecit" (Pray for the soul of Nicholas Portington, knight, who caused this chapel to be built). It is thought to be that of Nicholas Portington who was still alive in 1327.

The church was designated a Grade I listed building in 1966 and is now recorded in the National Heritage List for England, maintained by Historic England.

== See also ==
- Listed buildings in Eastrington
