= List of crossings of the River Ouse, Yorkshire =

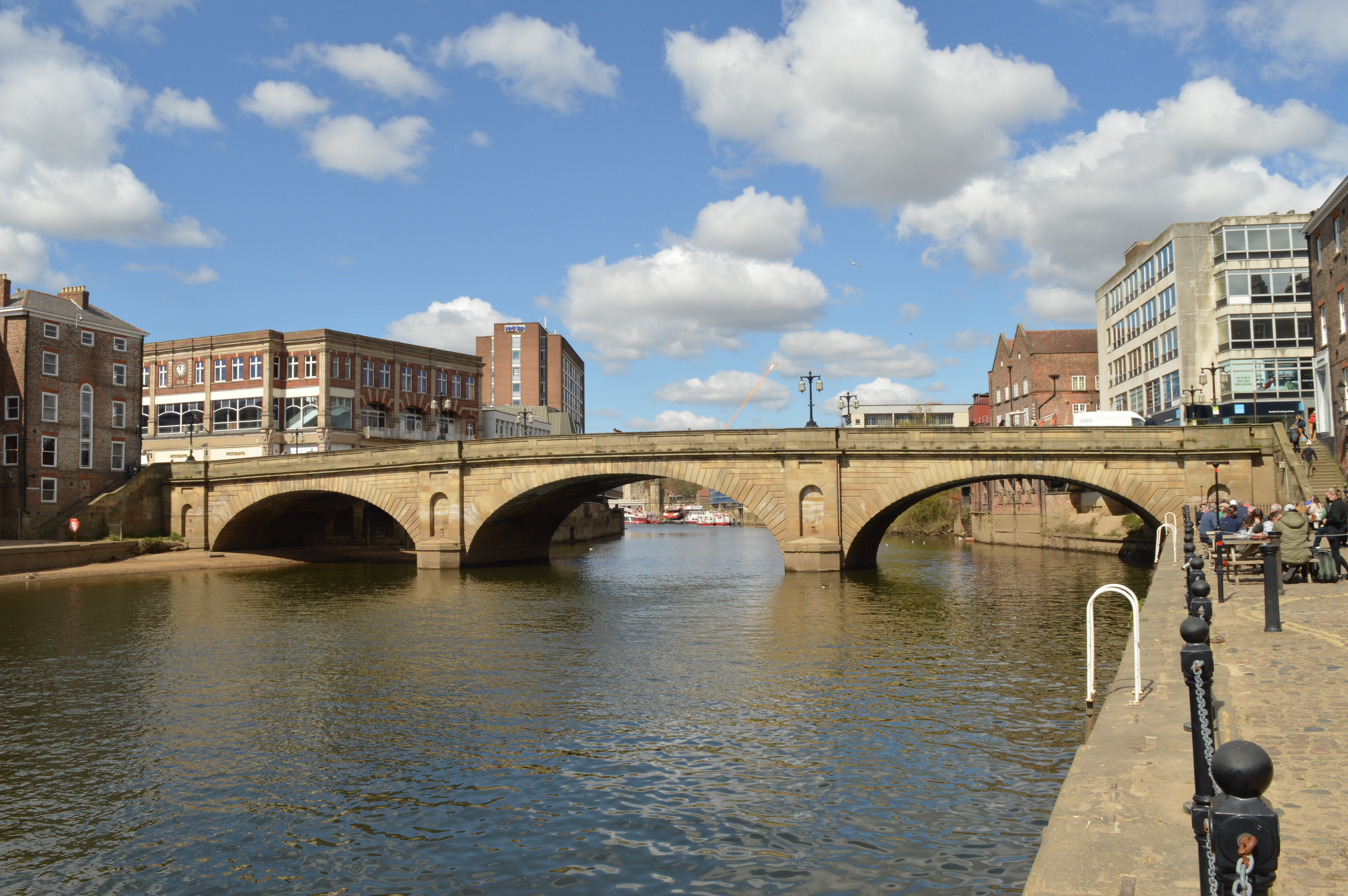
York Ouse Bridge

This is a list of current bridges and other crossings of the River Ouse in Yorkshire, and are listed from Ouse Gill Beck downstream to the river's mouth. The River Ouse is listed on mapping as starting where the Ouse Gill Beck enters the River Ure, just south of the village of Great Ouseburn, (SE473604). The Ouse joins the River Trent at Trent Falls, and becomes The Humber, travelling 57 miles (92 km) between Great Ouseburn and Trent Falls. Thereafter, there is only one other bridge, the Humber Bridge, before the river flows into the sea.

== Great Ouseburn to river mouth ==
| Crossing | Location | Type | Co-ordinates | Date opened | Listing | Notes | Photo |
|---|---|---|---|---|---|---|---|
| Linton Lock | Linton-on-Ouse | Foot | 54.0347°N 1.2386°W | 1767 | Grade II | Lock on the navigable River Ouse | Linton_Lock_-_geograph.org.uk_-_7420381 |
| Skelton Bridge | Nether Poppleton | Railway | 53.9909°N 1.1389°W | 1839/1942 | N/A | Twin-track railway bridge carrying the ECML, built c. 1839 by John Green, and single span line bridge built adjacent to Skelton Bridge to the west in 1942. | East_Coast_Main_Line_-_geograph.org.uk_-_2492606 |
| A1237 Bridge | Nether Poppleton | Road | 53.9834°N 1.1295°W | 1987 | N/A | Carries northern York Ring Road | Bridge_crossing_the_River_Ouse_-_geograph.org.uk_-_7582266 |
| Clifton Bridge | Clifton | Road | 53.9678°N 1.1034°W | 1963 | N/A | Carries the A1176 road. Temporary bridge built in 1961 on the site by the army in anticipation of vehicular traffic for a Royal Wedding in York Minster. This paved the way for the permanent bridge in 1963. | Clifton_Bridge_-_geograph.org.uk_-_7777397 |
| Scarborough Bridge | York | Railway | 53.9613°N 1.0927°W | 2015 | N/A | Carries the York to Scarborough railway line. First bridge was built in 1845, replaced in 1877, and then replaced by a newer bridge in 2015. | Train_crossing_Scarborough_Bridge_-_geograph.org.uk_-_8071699 |
| Lendal Bridge | York | Road | 53.9600°N 1.0872°W | 1863 | N/A | Replaced a ferry crossing on the same site. Bridge was strengthened in 1910 to accommodate the tram system being installed. | Lendal_Bridge,_York_-_geograph.org.uk_-_4906634 |
| Ouse Bridge | York | Road | 53.9575°N 1.0838°W | c. 1810–1820 | Grade II | This is the third bridge on the site; a medieval bridge was built here to replace the Roman bridge which collapsed, then the Tudor bridge was replaced by the current bridge. | Ouse_Bridge_-_geograph.org.uk_-_7716845 |
| Skeldergate Bridge | York | Road | 53.9541°N 1.0812°W | 1881 | Grade II | Skeldergate had a tollhouse and a building to work the lifting machinery. The far eastern span of the bridge could be raised to allow tall-masted ships to pass. | Skeldergate_Bridge_(geograph_7403256) |
| Millennium Bridge | York | Foot | 53.9448°N 1.082°W | 2001 | N/A | | The_Millennium_Bridge,_River_Ouse,_York_-_geograph.org.uk_-_1219712 |
| A64 Bridge | York | Road | 53.9277°N 1.0829°W | 1976 | N/A | Opened as part of the southern bypass around York in 1976 | Under the A64 bridge |
| Naburn swing bridge | Naburn | Foot | 53.9110°N 1.0912°W | 1871 | N/A | Swing bridge built for the railway in 1871. Became redundant in 1983 upon open of the Selby Diversion railway line. As shipping no longer travels up the Ouse, the bridge is fixed in place. | New use for Naburn Bridge [1] |
| Cawood Bridge | Cawood | Road | 53.8337°N 1.1283°W | 1872 | Grade II | Swing bridge for road traffic. | Cawood_Bridge_-_geograph.org.uk_-_3365984 |
| Selby toll bridge | Selby | Road | 53.7850°N 1.0644°W | 1793 | N/A | Rebuilt 1971 (toll now abolished) | Swing_bridge_-_Selby_-_geograph.org.uk_-_2640188 |
| Selby Swing Bridge | Selby | Railway | 53.7841°N 1.0622°W | 1891 | Grade II | Carries the railway line between Selby and Hull | Selby_railway_swing_bridge_over_the_Ouse_-_geograph.org.uk_-_5097632 |
| River Ouse swing bridge | Selby | Road | 53.7778°N 1.0374°W | 2004 | N/A | Carries the A63 bypass around Selby | Selby_Swing_Bridge_-_geograph.org.uk_-_8003459 |
| Boothferry Bridge | Boothferry | Road | 53.7276°N 0.8902°W | 1929 | N/A | Steel swing bridge | Boothferry_Bridge_-_geograph.org.uk_-_2981660 |
| Ouse Bridge | Howdendyke | Road | 53.7247°N 0.8786°W | 1976 | N/A | Carries M62 motorway | M62's_Ouse_Bridge,_from_the_river_-_geograph.org.uk_-_5131898 |
| Goole Swing Bridge | Goole | Railway | 53.7131°N 0.8424°W | 1869 | Grade II* | Carries the Doncaster to Hull railway | Downstream_pier,_Goole_Bridge_-_geograph.org.uk_-_5113500 |

A Roman bridge in York is believed to have existed until the 12th century when it was supposed to have collapsed under the weight of the throng of people who had gathered to welcome the Archbishop of York in 1254. The location of the bridge was between the foot of Tanner Row across to the Guildhall.

The former Hull and Barnsley Railway's formation crossed the River Ouse on a swing bridge at Long Drax. The line closed in 1968, and the bridge was dismantled in 1976.

== Ferries ==
The River Ouse has had plenty of ferry crossings in place of bridges. These crossing have lent their names to some of the locations along the river; Boothferry Bridge now occupies the site of the ferry across the river to the hamlet of Booth. Until 1792, when the bridge at Selby was built, the Ouse Bridge in York was the only crossing of the River Ouse, the other way of getting across the river was by a ferry.

Ferries were located at (upstream to downstream): Linton, Nun Monkton, Poppleton, Clifton, central York (three) Bishopthorpe, Naburn, Acaster Selby, Cawood, Newhay, Long Drax, Booth, Skelton, Swinefleet, Saltmarshe and Whitgift.

== See also ==
- Bridges of York
