= Selby swing bridge =

Selby swing bridge may refer to:

- Selby swing bridge (1840), a double leaf lifting bascule railway bridge built for the Hull and Selby Railway
- Selby swing bridge (1891), a hogback railway swing bridge built for the NER as a replacement for the 1840 bridge
- The River Ouse swing bridge (2004) on the A63 Selby bypass
- The Selby toll bridge (orig. 1791), a road bridge in Selby, North Yorkshire
