= Thorne Colliery =

Former coal mine in South Yorkshire, England

Coordinates: 53.6355°N 0.9350°W

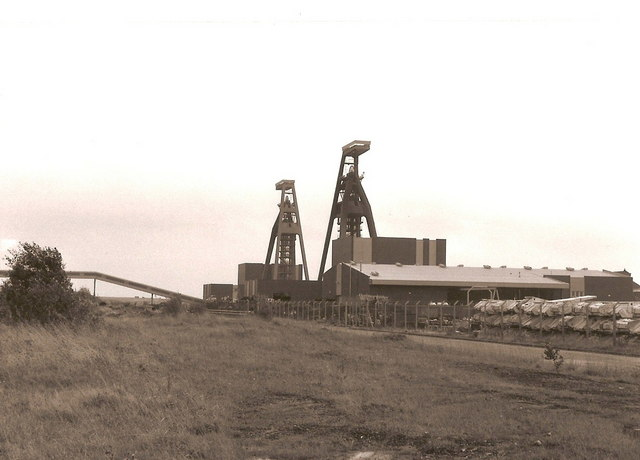
Thorne Colliery (1989)

Thorne Colliery was a large colliery within the Metropolitan Borough of Doncaster, South Yorkshire in the South Yorkshire Coalfield.

The colliery was open between 1925 and 1956; but had operational issues including shaft water, war time crises and maintenance trouble, causing the pit to be non-productive for much of its lifespan. Production ended in 1958 due to geological problems. Unsuccessful proposals to restart production were made in the 1980s and 1990s, and in 2004 the pit pumps were turned off and the headgear demolished.

== History and description ==
=== Mine construction (1902–24) ===
Thorne Colliery is situated upon the Thorne Moors 10 miles (16 km) north-east of Doncaster, next to the historical mining village of Moorends, north-west to Thorne.

The first experimental borings at the site began in 1902, and continued until 1908. A borehole sunk in 1904 by the Thorne Borehole Syndicate, a group of local businessmen, was proven in 1908 when the Barnsley Bed was hit at a depth of 916 yards, which was roughly 9 feet (2.7 m) thick.

Sinking of Thorne pit was undertaken by firm of Pease & Partners of Darlington; Pease and Partners stated that work would commence as soon as possible once a temporary railway connection had been constructed; the company forecast production of 6,000 tons of coal per day to the surface (1.5 million p.a.); the estimated cost of the pit was £500,000 over ten years. Work on creating the pit began c. 1909, but shortly afterwards pit water issues became apparent. After June 1910 the workings were inundated with water, and work was suspended whilst electric pumps were installed. Sinking eventually resumed again but there were considerable difficulties in the sinking process, which was highlighted at the Annual General Meeting of the Company in June 1911, though the proprietors remained optimistic of success. Sinking encountered problems again in 1912, causing suspension of works; it was announced that operations would only be resumed if royalty owners agreed to reduced payments. This issue meant only a few men were employed on the site at this time and sinking was again prolonged. Ground freezing was used during construction during 1913, with expectations of the work taking a further eighteen months to complete, with coal production after a further three years. In June 1914, it was announced that the future of Thorne Colliery was practically safe.

The outbreak of the First World War severely impacted the construction of the pit: the German workers responsible for the freezing operations were arrested and taken to York Castle. They were released the next day and returned to Thorne where they were registered, allowing work to restart. However, a week later these workers were re-arrested, although four German workers were present at the mine in November. In June 1915 however sinking operations were suspended.

Work restarted in 1919; six months later it was reported that the water ingress had practically stopped and the resulting work was up to standard. However, the issues when sinking the pit prior to the Annual General Meeting of 1920 resulted in more delays and at this meeting the proprietors were informed it would take another three to four years to finish sinking operations.

=== Production (1924–58), and shaft disaster (1926) ===
Coal was finally reached in August 1924 at a depth of 921.5 yards (842.6 m) and was worked from January 1925. The sinking of the second pit shaft was then completed the following year which was claimed to be the deepest pit in South Yorkshire.

On 15 March 1926 however, shortly before the completion of shaft number 2, six men fell to their deaths when the Capstan engine controlling the scaffolding upon which they were working malfunctioned. It was described in local papers with headlines such as "Mysterious Mishap", as the full cause of the tragedy was unknown. It was not the first loss of life at the pit but was to be ultimately the most costly. The incident was the largest loss of life in a mine in the United Kingdom in 1926. The six men who lost their lives are as follows; Edmund Thorley, age 33 – 1st Chargeman sinker, John Hansbury, age 34 – 2nd Chargeman sinker, John William Barley, age 51 – Sinker, Charles H. Walton, aged 33 – Sinker, Ernest Clark, aged 26 – Sinker and finally John A. Reed, aged 21 – Sinker.

Immediately after the accident occurred the agent, Mr. Hoyle, proceeded to descend into the shaft to the estimated 11 ft water-level where nothing could be seen. There were some minimal markings to the shaft walls below where the platform had fallen and little damage apart from some girders which had been dislodged at the High Hazel presumably by the tumbling scaffolding ropes. Recovery operations took place and the water remaining at the bottom of the shaft was removed: some of the wreckage at the bottom of the shaft had to be removed by using oxyacetylene burners before the bodies were finally recovered. The first body was initially recovered on Wednesday 17 March 1926 and the last on Friday 19 March 1926 and by Thursday 25 March 1926 the shaft bottom was fully cleared.

As reported by the local newspaper (as reported in The Colliery Guardian on 15 March 1926) the six men were finishing work on the second shaft when their portable platform below ground collapsed. The Capstan engine which malfunctioned was powered by a two-cylinder engine; attached to each drum however on the Capstan engine were pawls or ratchets which should have prevented the Capstan engine slipping; and the inspected machinery was found to be in order; there was no evidence to prove mechanical failure or human aberration. At the coroner's inquest the jury returned a verdict of accidental death. The given verdict had been largely influenced by a special report made regarding this accident by Mr H.M. Hudspeth, H.M. Divisional Inspector for the Yorkshire Division of Mines. The conclusion he personally produced was that the engine driver accidentally put his level into the position for lowering scaffold while the capstan drums were held by the restraining pawls. It was his recommendation that pawls should not be used on worm driven capstan engines.

Shortly following the accident Thorne pit began to produce coal at a substantial rate, with the prospects of the pit being a profitable business seeming good. Messrs Pease and Partners proposed to develop a railway from the pit to Swinefleet on the River Ouse, a plan similar to earlier proposals of 1908–10 and 1913 plans of the L&YR Company. However, there were significant objections from railway companies operating within this area and the bill proposed to the House of Lords was withdrawn on 8 May 1927.

After production had begun in both shafts there was a period of time during which Thorne was one of the most successful pits in South Yorkshire. Production ran relatively smoothly through the 1930s and 1940s, though the shaft water issue was a constant nuisance. Strained labour relations were also an issue during this period, which also affected profitability and productivity.

On 1 January 1947 (known as "Vesting Day") the coal industry was nationalised and Thorne Colliery became part of the National Coal Board (NCB). The colliery produced coal for another nine years until water issues caused its closure.

=== End of production (1958) ===
In 1956 the pit was "temporarily closed" due to flooding and faults, after which the pit was kept in maintained order. A small number of miners were made redundant on a voluntary basis and other workers were redeployed elsewhere. Initial forecasts were optimistic regarding the reopening of the pit but a series of setbacks quelled such optimism. On 31 July 1958 the Doncaster Examiner reported that "excess flood waters have again battered through tons of concrete, causing the worst setback since the pit was closed two years ago". The National Coal Board predicted that "coal would be turned at Thorne within three or four months of next year". By 1962 the predicted re-opening date had been put back to 1964 at the earliest; in November of that year it was reported that waterproofing would be completed by the following June.

In August 1966 a paper of the Mining Engineers opened with the words "Thorne Colliery was probably the most courageous coal mining enterprise undertaken in the early years of the twentieth century", going on to note the pit had a fundamental problem in the "unconformable strata" (strata geologically out of sequence), which led to excessive water flow. Shaft linings had simply failed in the pit conditions and had led in August 1958 to the failure of the No. 2 shaft. The paper proposed the installation of composite shaft linings, having an inner cylinder of steel bonded to high grade concrete able to withstand the hydrostatic pressures.

In September 1966 the Thorne Gazette noted that "the pit has been closed for ten years", Thorne Colliery remained in a state of limbo, with millions of pounds of money being invested to repair the damage.

=== Attempted re-openings ===
In the 1980s the NCB began planning a £180 million restarting of production at the site. New headgear and new winding systems were erected, but the sharp decline in coal prices brought an end to the plan.

In the 1990s RJB Mining proposed to restart production, but in 2002 it was decided that the establishment of the pit was uneconomical.

==== Legacy ====
In 2004 the pumps at the site were turned off and on 18 August of that year the headgear was demolished. The news of this saddened many members of the community and many watched at the site on the day of the demolition.

One of a few reminders of the Colliery today is Thorne Colliery F.C.

==== Solar Farm ====
The site is now home to a 5 megawatt solar farm developed by RES. The construction was completed in December 2015.

== See also ==
- Selby Coalfield
- Hull and Doncaster Branch
