= Kilpin Pike =

Village in the East Riding of Yorkshire, England

Coordinates: 53.732986°N 0.846996°W

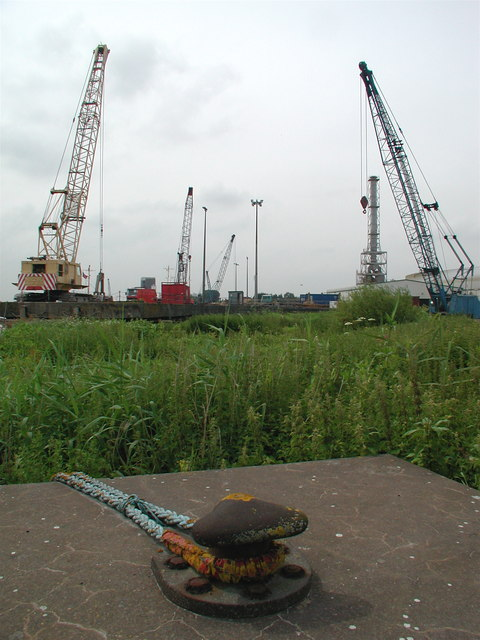
- Old moorings on the Ouse by Kilpin Pike

- Location within the East Riding of Yorkshire
- OS grid reference: SE761269
  - London: 155 mi (249 km) S
- Civil parish: Kilpin
- Unitary authority: East Riding of Yorkshire
- Ceremonial county: East Riding of Yorkshire
- Region: Yorkshire and the Humber
- Country: England
- Sovereign state: United Kingdom
- Post town: GOOLE
- Postcode district: DN14
- Dialling code: 01430
- Police: Humberside
- Fire: Humberside
- Ambulance: Yorkshire
- UK Parliament: Goole and Pocklington

Kilpin Pike is a village in the East Riding of Yorkshire, England. It is situated approximately 2 miles (3.2 km) north of Goole town centre, about 1 mile (1.6 km) south of Howden, and lies on the north bank of the River Ouse.

The village forms part of the civil parish of Kilpin.

In 1823 Kilpin Pike was in the parish of Howden and the Wapentake and Liberty of Howdenshire. Occupations at the time included two shopkeepers, a butcher, a coal merchant, and the landlords of the Blue Bell and Admiral Nelson public houses.
