= Ouse Bridge (M62) =

Road bridge in the East Riding of Yorkshire, England

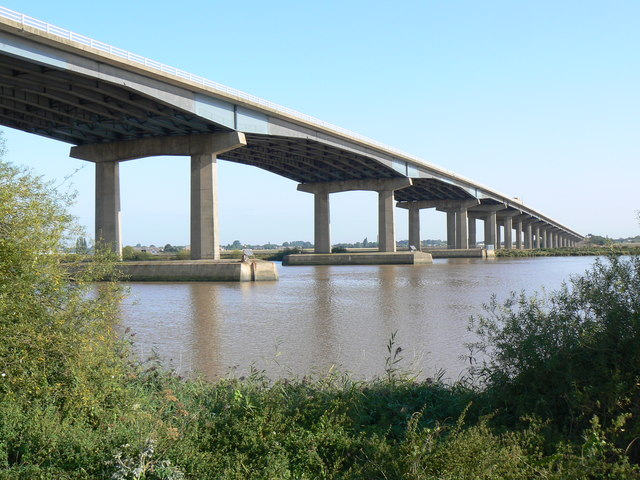
- Central spans over the Ouse
- Coordinates: 53.727°N 0.879°W
- OS grid reference: NZ256639
- Carries: Road Motor Vehicles (M62)
- Crosses: River Ouse
- Locale: Goole
- Maintained by: National Highways
- Preceded by: Boothferry Bridge
- Followed by: Goole railway swing bridge

Characteristics
- Design: Plate girder bridge
- Material: Reinforced concrete
- Total length: 1.6 kilometres (0.99 mi)
- Height: 30 metres (98 ft)
- Longest span: 89 metres (292 ft) (three main spans)
- No. of spans: 29
- Piers in water: 4

History
- Designer: Scott Wilson Kirkpatrick & Partners
- Constructed by: Costain
- Fabrication by: Redpath Dorman Long
- Construction start: January 1973
- Construction end: May 1976
- Construction cost: £6.75 million
- Inaugurated: 24 May 1976

The Ouse Bridge is a reinforced concrete plate girder bridge that spans River Ouse between Goole and Howden in the East Riding of Yorkshire, England. It carries the M62 and is situated between junctions 36 and 37. It was built between 1973 and 1976 by Costain and was designed by Scott Wilson Kirkpatrick & Partners. The bridge was officially opened to traffic on 24 May 1976 by nine-year-old Martin Brigham.

== History ==
Traffic to and from Hull to the A1 historically went over Boothferry Bridge, on the A614, which was a swing bridge.

The position of the bridge and the M62 resulted from a study carried out in 1964 by Scott Wilson Kirkpatrick & Partners. They would also design the bridge. It is a haunched girder bridge.

=== Regional position ===
The extension of the M18 (from the current M180), the M62, and the first part of (what would become) the M180 (to Scunthorpe only) was announced in Hull in September 1965. At that time, it would be five years before the M62 would cross the Pennines, and the Humber Bridge would not be given firm funding until the 1966 Kingston upon Hull North by-election in January 1966. The extension of the M180 would also require a similar bridge over the Trent which, like the Ouse Bridge, was the final part of that motorway section to open (in 1979, three years later). The Humber Bridge began construction (on the south-side embankment) in July 1972, and the Ouse Bridge followed only six months later; both were being built at the same time, and the Humber Bridge opened five years after the Ouse Bridge. Costain built the 2.5 kilometres (1.6 mi) southern approach road from the Humber Bridge to the A1077 at the same time as the Ouse Bridge, including a 320 metres (1,050 ft) viaduct with seven concrete box spans. Both sides of the Humber and Ouse would be linked in February 1977. At the time of opening of the Ouse Bridge, the Humber Bridge was projected to cost £40 million, and to be completed by 1978. The M18 was projected, at the time, to open by mid-1978, but opened in February 1979.

=== Design ===
In the early stages an immersed tube tunnel was considered, which was thought to be too expensive. The superstructure was designed by Redpath Dorman Long and G Maunsell & Partners. 1,310 metres (4,300 ft) of the River Ouse had to be bridged. The area was in the Boothferry district of Humberside. The gradient of the road on the approach to the bridge is 1 in 33.

== Construction ==
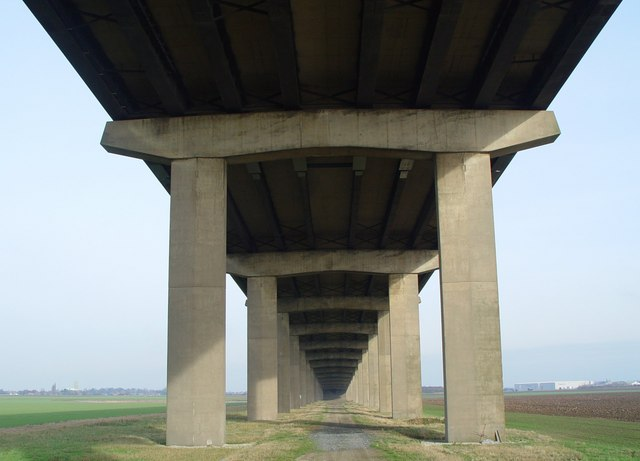
View from underneath

The Ouse Bridge Contract for £6.75 million (£103 million in 2023) was awarded on Friday 5 January 1973 to a consortium of Costain Civil Engineering and Redpath Dorman Long. At that time there were 76 miles of M62 from Tarbock to Ferrybridge.

A box girder was asked for, but the consortium submitted a plate girder instead. A box girder design was not chosen due to recent accidents, and an inquiry by the Institution of Structural Engineers.

7,000 tons of steel came from RDL plants in Teesside and Scunthorpe. There were steel supply problems. The embankment started construction on Monday 22 January 1973. Main construction started on Saturday 1 April 1973, by the 2,000 ton American floating crane 'Big R', with a 180-ft-high jib, which could lift 100 tons; the ship was built in 1961 for the Chesapeake Bay Bridge–Tunnel. Bob Adams from Virginia and John Anderson from Portland Oregon worked on the bridge for Raymond Concrete Pile Company subsidiary. There were 120 large steel cylinder piles of 1.5-metre (4 ft 11 in) diameter and 20 metres (66 ft) long driven into the ground by a self-elevating platform barge with a steam hammer.

For the concrete, sand came from Pollington and also PFA from nearby coal power stations. There were 96 piles in the river.

Steel erection of girders was to begin in December 1973, but started in October 1974. The roadway was supported by a lattice of girders from the beams.

On Sunday 20 July 1975 three 86-ton 100-ft girders on the centre pier in the river slipped, with a partial collapse of a military trestle on pier 15.

The last section was fitted at 2pm on Tuesday 14 October 1975

=== Opening ===
It was opened on 24 May 1976 by nine-year-old Martin Brigham, who had been handed the scissors at the last moment by Minister of Transport John Gilbert, Baron Gilbert, who was to have opened it. It was the last section of the main part of the M62 to open, comprising 175 kilometres (109 mi). The M62 had taken 15 years and cost £190 million. The A63 Caves Bypass and M62 Balkholme sections (built by Clugston Construction) had opened on 19 February 1976. The Balkholme to Caves section was the first use on a UK motorway of continuously reinforced concrete pavement (CRCP), which has no transverse joints.

=== Repair ===
In 2022, a partial failure of a joint on the eastbound carriageway was identified after it was discovered that increased vibration from traffic had started to damage the concrete under lane three and a bridge joint, which allows the carriageway to expand and contract with the weather. Temporary bridging plates were installed over the damaged bridge joints as a temporary mitigation measure, followed by the critically damaged joints on the eastbound carriageway being replaced by spring 2023. It was then delayed to reopen in August 2024 which has since been delayed again till further notice.

Bridges over the River Ouse
Upstream: Boothferry Bridge	Downstream: Goole railway swing bridge
