= Listed buildings in Linton-on-Ouse =

Linton-on-Ouse is a civil parish in the county of North Yorkshire, England. It contains four listed buildings that are recorded in the National Heritage List for England. All the listed buildings are designated at Grade II, the lowest of the three grades, which is applied to "buildings of national importance and special interest". The parish contains the village of Linton-on-Ouse and the surrounding countryside. The River Ouse passes through the parish, and the listed buildings associated with it are a lock and the former lock keeper's cottage. The other listed buildings are farmhouses.

== Buildings ==
Name and location	Photograph	Date	Notes
Lock House Restaurant; 54.03483°N 1.23887°W		Mid to late 18th century	A lock keeper's cottage, later extended and used for other purposes, it is in red-brown brick, the extension is in yellowish brick, and it has stepped and dentilled eaves, and a pantile roof. There are two storeys, two bays, an added bay to the left, and a single-storey addition to the right with a hipped roof. On the front are two doorways, the right doorway flanked by canted bay windows, and above are sash windows in architraves. In the extension is a window with a cambered brick arch.
Linton Lock; 54.03473°N 1.23872°W		c. 1767	The lock on the River Ouse is in limestone. The walls consist of large blocks of stone, and the gates have been renewed.
Middlewood House; 54.05216°N 1.22310°W		Late 18th century	The farmhouse is in orange and mottled pink brick, with a dentilled eaves band, and a roof of Welsh slate with some pantiles. There are two storeys and four bays. On the front are two doorways in architraves with fanlights. The windows on the front are sashes in architraves, and all the openings have cambered brick arches. Elsewhere, some of the sash windows are horizontally-sliding.
Manor Farm House; 54.04049°N 1.24558°W	—	Late 18th to early 19th century	The house is in mottled pink brick, with dentilled eaves, and a pantile roof with partial coping on the left gable. There are two storeys and four bays. On the front is a portico with a Classical entablature, and a doorway with a fanlight. The windows are sashes, those to the left of the portico with cambered brick arches, and those to the right with segmental brick arches.
