= Listed buildings in Thorne, South Yorkshire =

Thorne is a civil parish in the metropolitan borough of Doncaster, South Yorkshire, England. The parish contains 23 listed buildings that are recorded in the National Heritage List for England. Of these, one is listed at Grade I, the highest of the three grades, and the others are at Grade II, the lowest grade. The parish contains the town of Thorne, the village of Moorends, and the surrounding countryside. Most of the listed buildings are houses and associated structures, and farmhouses. The other listed buildings include a church, a coffin in the churchyard, a public house, a former windmill, a river wharf, two war memorials, and a former charity school.

== Key ==
Grade	Criteria
I	Particularly important buildings of more than special interest
II	Buildings of national importance and special interest

== Buildings ==
Name and location	Photograph	Date	Notes	Grade
St Nicholas' Church; 53.61151°N 0.95898°W		12th century	The church has been altered and extended through the centuries. It is built in limestone with lead roofs, and consists of a nave with a clerestory, north and south aisles, a south porch, a chancel with a transeptal south chapel, a north organ chamber and vestry, and a west tower embraced by the aisles. The tower has three stages, buttresses, a two-light west window, string courses, two-light bell openings, a clock face on the west side, and an embattled parapet with eight crocketed pinnacles and a weathervane. The gabled porch has two storeys, and a Tudor arched doorway, above which is a coat of arms and an oriel window.	I
Remains of medieval coffin 53.61137°N 0.95891°W	—	Late medieval	The remains of the coffin are in the churchyard of St Nicholas' Church, to the south of the porch. They are in magnesian limestone, and consist of a tapered coffin hollowed out for the head and the body. Much of the sides are broken away.	II
Lockermarsh; 53.60725°N 0.96043°W	—	c. 1700	A house, later altered and used for other purposes, it is in red brick with coped eaves, and a two-span pantile roof. There are two storeys and antics, a double-depth plan, and four bays. On the front is a doorway flanked by bay windows, and the other windows are a mix of sashes and casements.	II
Chatterton Farmhouse; 53.65698°N 0.98983°W	—	Early 18th century	The farmhouse is in red brick, with tabled eaves courses, and a pantile roof with coped gables and shaped kneelers. There are two storeys and four bays, and a continuous rear outshut. Most of the windows are sashes.	II
Settings Farmhouse; 53.61319°N 0.96913°W	—	1728	The farmhouse is in red brick on a plinth, with bands, moulded dentilled eaves, and a tile roof. There are two storeys and an attic, three bays, a two-storey single-bay extension on the left, and an outshut on the rear right. The doorway has a fanlight and a cornice, and the windows are sashes. In the right return is a datestone, and inside are back-to-back inglenook fireplaces.	II
The White Hart Inn; 53.61110°N 0.96115°W		1737	The public house, which has an earlier core, is partly roughcast and partly stuccoed, it is on a plinth, and has roofs of pantile and Welsh slate roof. The main block has three storeys and three bays, the middle bay projecting, and a parapet, there is a rear wing on the right, and an extension beyond that. The central doorway has an architrave, a fanlight, and a cornice, and it is flanked by two-storey shallow bow windows. In the outer bays of the top floor are casement windows, and separate iron tie-plates as numerals forming the date. In the rear wing is a doorway with a bracketed canopy and sash windows.	II
Garden wall and gate piers, 20 Stonegate; 53.60992°N 0.95872°W	—	Mid 18th century (probable)	The garden wall and gate piers are in red brick. The wall has stone coping, it is about 2 metres (6 ft 7 in) high, and extends for about 10 metres (33 ft) to the right, and 25 metres (82 ft) to the left, of the gateway. The piers are slightly taller and have moulded stone cornices and pyramidal finials.	II
Grove House Farmhouse; 53.59019°N 0.91608°W	—	18th century	The farmhouse is in rendered brick, with cogged eaves, and a pantile roof with coped gables and shaped kneelers. There are two storeys and an attic, three bays, and a single-storey two-bay extension recessed on the left. The central doorway has a fanlight, the windows in the main part are sashes, and in the extension they are casements.	II
The Old Vicarage; 53.61109°N 0.95886°W		Mid 18th century	The rectory was refronted later in the 18th century, and has since been used for other purposes. It is in stuccoed brick on a plinth, with an eaves cornice, and a Welsh slate roof with coped gables. There are three storeys, five bays, and a lower wing recessed on the left. Over the middle three bays is a pediment, with an oeil-de-boeuf in the tympanum. The central doorway has fluted pilasters, a fanlight, an archivolt, and a pediment, and the windows are casements. At the rear is a round-headed stair window, and the other windows have segmental heads.	II
1 Silver Street and 31 Bridge Street; 53.61024°N 0.96033°W		Mid to late 18th century	A house, later used for other purposes, it is in red brick on a rendered plinth, with rusticated quoins, an eaves cornice, and a Welsh slate roof with coped gables. There are three storeys, a double-depth plan, five bays, and a rear wing on the right. Steps lead up to a central wooden porch with fluted Doric columns, a frieze and a dentilled cornice, and a doorway with fluted pilasters and a fanlight. The windows are sashes with keystones. In the right return is a doorway with a fanlight and a cornice, flanked by canted bay windows.	II
Thorne Hall; 53.60909°N 0.96059°W		Mid to late 18th century	A large house, later used for other purposes, it is in roughcast rendered brick with Welsh slate roofs. There are three storeys and an attic, five bays over which is a pediment containing an oculus with an architrave, and a moulded cornice, and flanking recessed pavilion wings with hipped roofs, two storeys and one bay. The main block has rusticated quoins, and a central doorway with an architrave, a semicircular fanlight, and a cornice. This is flanked by two-storey bow windows, and in the top floor are sash windows. The wings contain a Venetian window in the ground floor and a tripartite sash window above.	II
Micklethwaite Farmhouse; 53.63615°N 0.95026°W	—	Late 18th century	The farmhouse is in brick on a plinth, with bands, and a pantile roof with coped gables and shaped kneelers. There are two storeys and attics, three bays, and a lower two-storey extension recessed on the right, with a single-storey lean-to. The doorway in the left return has a fanlight, most of the windows are casements, and there is a horizontally-sliding sash window and a round-arched stair window.	II
Gate piers, St Nicholas' Church; 53.61130°N 0.95906°W		Late 18th century	The gate piers are at the southwest entrance to the churchyard. They are in magnesian limestone and repaired in sandstone. Each pier is square on a moulded plinth, and at the top is a block, a cornice, and a ball finial with a band. Between the piers are wrought iron gates, and an overthrow with a lantern bracket.	II
Stonegate House; 53.60995°N 0.95841°W	—	Late 18th century	A house, later a Masonic Hall, it is in red brick on a plinth, and has a hipped Welsh slate roof. There are two storeys and an L-shaped plan, with ranges of six and seven bays. The doorway has a fanlight, there is a canted bay window, and the other windows are sashes.	II
44A and 44B King Street; 53.61190°N 0.96206°W		c. 1800	A house, later divided, in stuccoed red brick, with a moulded cornice, a coped parapet stepped up at the ends, and a Welsh slate roof. There are three storeys, three bays, and a narrow two-storey bay on the left. Steps lead up to a central doorway with a semicircular fanlight and a pediment, This is flanked by bow windows, and in the upper floors are sash windows.	II
Outbuilding to rear of 44A King Street; 53.61198°N 0.96186°W	—	c. 1800	Originally the service wing to the house, it is in red brick, and has a pantile roof, hipped on the right. There are two storeys and four bays. The doorway has a fanlight, on the left is a two-storey bay window, and the other windows are sashes.	II
Sandhill Farmhouse; 53.59322°N 0.90480°W	—	c. 1800	A red brick farmhouse, rendered apart from the front, with dentilled eaves, and a tile roof with coped gables and shaped kneelers. There are two storeys and an attic, and four bays. The central doorway has a fanlight, the windows are casements, and all have segmental-arched heads.	II
26 Finkle Street; 53.61130°N 0.96271°W	—	Early 19th century	Shops with dwellings above, they are in red brick on a plinth with a pantile roof. There are three storeys and three bays. In the ground floor are modern shop fronts, and above are casement windows.	II
Tower mill 53.61556°N 0.96392°W		Early 19th century	The former tower windmill is in tarred red brick, and consists of a truncated cone. There are five storeys, and a cogged band under the parapet. The building contains doorways and windows with segmental heads.	II
River Don Wharf; 53.61886°N 0.98141°W	—	Mid 19th century (probable)	The wharf is on the old course of the River Don. It is in gritstone, and consists of a considerable retaining wall, with bands, and copings linked by iron clamps. There is a central recess with stone steps.	II
Crimean War Memorial Pump, Market Place; 53.61088°N 0.96114°W	—	1856	The pump is a memorial to those lost in the Crimean War, and was moved to its present site in 1987. It is in cast iron, and consists of a moulded circular trough, over which is a Doric column. There are spouts above the trough and near the top.	II
Crimean War Memorial Pump, Memorial Park; 53.60924°N 0.96136°W	—	1856	The pump is a memorial to those lost in the Crimean War, and was moved to its present site in 1987. It is in cast iron, and consists of a moulded circular trough, over which is a Doric column. On the column is an inscribed plaque, a cranked handle, and spouts above the trough and near the top.	II
Travis Studio; 53.61150°N 0.95970°W		1863	The school, later used for other purposes, is in red brick with sandstone dressings, a rendered plinth, quoins, and a Welsh slate roof with coped gables, shaped kneelers, and finials. There is a single storey, a front of two gables with a bell turret between them, and flanking lower gabled porches. Each gable contains a square-headed three-light window with Decorated tracery, under each window is an inscribed panel, and in the apex is a quatrefoil. Between the gables is a buttress, and corbels carrying an octagonal turret with gableted openings, and surmounted by a spire. The porches contain doorways with fanlights, pointed heads, and hood moulds.	II
