= Selby Toll Bridge =

Bridge in North Yorkshire, England

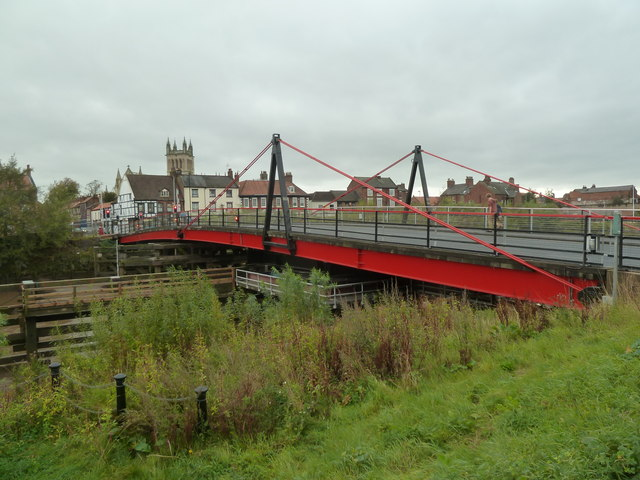
- The swing bridge at Selby
- Coordinates: 53.785°N 1.064°W
- OS grid reference: SE617324
- Carries: A19
- Crosses: River Ouse
- Locale: Selby, North Yorkshire, England
- Other name: Selby Swing Bridge
- Preceded by: Cawood Bridge
- Followed by: Selby railway swing bridge

Characteristics
- Design: Swing bridge
- Material: Oak timbers
- Total length: 200 feet (60 m) (both bridges)
- Width: 18 feet (5.6 m) (original bridge); 22 feet (6.7 m) (1970s bridge)

History
- Architect: William Jessop
- Opened: c. 1793
- Rebuilt: 1971

Statistics
- Toll: 7 pence (in 1991)

Location
- Interactive map of Selby Toll Bridge

Selby Toll Bridge is one of three swing bridges in the town of Selby, North Yorkshire, England. A timber bridge over the River Ouse in the town was opened in c. 1793 to replace a ferry crossing that had existed since Medieval times. The bridge provided a connection between the West and East Ridings of Yorkshire across the River Ouse, (Note: Until 1974, Selby was in the West Riding of Yorkshire, but it is now in North Yorkshire.) and became the furthest downstream public bridge crossing over the river until 1929, when the Boothferry Bridge was built. The moving section of the original bridge used ball-bearings and cog wheels; the bridge is believed to be the first in the world to use ball-bearings. The replacement 1970s bridge, now only carries the A19 road as the A63 bypass was opened in 2004.

== History ==
A ferry had existed near to the toll bridge since at least 13th century controlled by the monks of Selby Abbey. During the Dissolution, the rights to run the ferry were sold off. In 1789, four years before the bridge was opened, records showed that the ferries carried 105,000 passengers, 75,000 horses, 30,000 farm animals, and 500 carriages. The first toll bridge on the site was built in 1792, under permission granted in The Selby Bridge Act (1791), which also set the toll rates. It replaced the ferry crossing, which was still in use in July 1793, when the ferry sank, with the loss of one human and one horse. When it was built, the toll bridge provided a fixed link between the West and East Ridings of Yorkshire.

The railway bridge is located some 200 yards (180 m) downstream of the toll bridge, so that if a water vessel was approaching, both bridges had to open in quick succession. It was originally intended by the directors of the Leeds & Selby Railway, that their terminus in Selby be adjacent to the toll bridge, but it was decided that the proximity to the toll bridge would hamper their future development eastwards towards Hull, and so the station was located further east.

The toll bridge had a span which swung open 30 feet (9.1 m) sideways to allow river traffic to pass, significantly less than the railway bridge downstream which could afford a passage width of 80-foot (24 m). The original toll bridge was 200 feet (60 m) in length and 18 feet (5.6 m) in width. The bridge was built mostly of timber, and worked with cogs and ball-bearings, which were similar to the types used in cannons. The Selby Toll Bridge is believed to be the first moveable bridge in the world to use ball-bearings. Soon after the opening of the bridge, the road through Selby to Barlby and then onto Market Weighton was turnpiked.

Until the swing bridge at Selby was built, there was no crossing of the River Ouse south of York. During the petition to Parliament for the Selby Toll Bridge, many people in York objected to the proposal as they thought it would affect the Ouse navigation, pointing out that "...several vessels had been lost at Goole where bridges had been erected in the tideways." In 1872, a bridge was opened between York and Selby at Cawood (Cawood Bridge). The distance between Cawood Bridge and Selby Toll Bridge is 8 miles (13 km) by the meandering river, but only 5 miles (8 km) as the crow flies. When the Hull and Selby Railway gained consent to build their bridge downstream from the toll bridge, a clause was inserted to the effect that if there was a steady decrease in receipts of traffic over the road bridge, the railway company would compensate the toll road bridge company. In the 1920s, various motoring organisations objected to the charges on the Selby Toll Bridge, as it was on the main route through Doncaster to York, then Newcastle. The issue of the bridge warranted the proposal of a bypass in 1929, at a cost of £203,000 (equivalent to £15,588,000 in 2023).

By the early 1960s, the bridge was being used by about 5,000 motorists per day, each spending 9d (about 4p in today's money). By 1963, 6,800 vehicles were using the bridge, generating £255 per day, some £90,000 per year. However, ambulances were stopping at the bridge ends, and patients were transferred between the West and East Ridings via a stretcher across the bridge due to cost. An article in the Sunday Telegraph in March 1963, alleged that the bridge owners were "using an anachronistic law to make excessive profits at the expense of dissatisfied local inhabitants." A high court libel case ensued with the judge finding the article to be wholly unjustified, and he fined the newspaper the sum of £500, (equivalent to £12,000 in 2023). The bridge was rebuilt in the late 1960s/early 1970s, and had a steel superstructure built instead of timber. The previous bridge had become known as the best surviving example of a timber road bridge in England. The renovation/rebuild has been described as being "sympathetic to William Jessop's original 1790s bridge". The swing part of the bridge opens to provide a 36 feet 9 inches (11.20 m) opening to allow water vessels to pass. Both bridges were 200 feet (60 m) in length, but the newer bridge is 3 feet 7 inches (1.1 m) wider than the original bridge which was 18 feet (5.6 m).

In July 1984, striking miners were said to have "besieged the town and bridge", which resulted in the closure of the bridge for several hours. The toll for the bridge meant that queuing traffic created a bottleneck throughout the town. In September 1991, Selby Council and North Yorkshire County Council bought the bridge and abolished the tolls, which had been rated at 7 pence per pedestrian. Local businesses contributed to the buyout plan as they had suffered with the near-constant gridlock when traffic paid to pay the toll, and then the bridge would need to be swung aside to let a ship or boat through. The last person to pay the toll was the chair of the county council in a ceremonial traversing of the bridge on 19 September 1991.

Since 2004, the bridge has carried the A19 road on its own, with the A63 bypass using a curve to the south and then the A63 River Ouse swing bridge. Until the bypass was opened, the A19 and the A63 formed a multiplex over the old bridge. Since the opening of the A63 bypass in 2004, there are now three swing bridges in Selby; the old Toll bridge, the railway swing bridge, and the newer swing bridge carrying the A63 bypass.

== Bridge strikes ==
Several barges, ships, or boats, have struck the bridge over its lifespan;

- June 1889 – the schooner The City of York smashed her rigging on the bridge owing to the bridge being opened only half-way. The chain on the bridge's mechanism became stuck and prevented the bridge from opening fully. The speed of the vessel and the tide prevented her from slowing down in time to prevent a collision.
- May 1930 – the barge Agility smashed into one of the bridge supports causing substantial damage. The bridge company had to install a ferry service whilst the bridge was repaired. Road traffic was diverted to both Cawood and Boothferry Bridges.
- 1979 – two bridge strikes in two days caused £4,000 worth of damage.

== Notes ==
Bridges over the River Ouse
Upstream: Cawood Bridge	Downstream: Selby swing bridge
