= Listed buildings in Kilpin =

Kilpin is a civil parish in the county of the East Riding of Yorkshire, England. It contains three listed buildings that are recorded in the National Heritage List for England. All the listed buildings are designated at Grade II, the lowest of the three grades, which is applied to "buildings of national importance and special interest". The parish contains the village of Kilpin and the surrounding countryside, and the listed buildings consist of two farmhouses and a country house.

== Buildings ==
Name and location	Photograph	Date	Notes
East Lynton Farmhouse; 53.74572°N 0.78726°W	—	Late 18th century	The house is in whitewashed brick, and has a pantile roof with gable coping and shaped kneelers. There are two storeys, three bays, and a rear cross-wing. The doorway has a fanlight and a canopy, and the windows are sashes under flat brick arches.
West Linton Farmhouse; 53.74244°N 0.79900°W	—	Late 18th century	The house is in brick, and has a pantile roof with gable coping and shaped kneelers. There are two storeys, three bays, and a continuous rear outshut. The doorway has fluted pilasters, and a divided fanlight. The windows are sashes under flat brick arches.
Sand Hall; 53.70511°N 0.84614°W		1777	A country house that has been extended, in red brick, with a shallow hipped slate roof, and three storeys. The south front has seven bays, the middle bay projecting slightly, a single-storey single-bay projection to the left and a two-storey one-bay extension to the right. Steps lead up to a porch with a pediment, and a doorway with a fanlight, a decorated keystone, and a pediment on consoles containing an initialled datestone. This is flanked by sash windows, outside which are canted bay windows, all with keystones. The east front has seven bays, the middle three bays bowed on the lower two floors.
