= Belby =

Hamlet in the East Riding of Yorkshire, England

Coordinates: 53.750052°N 0.831818°W

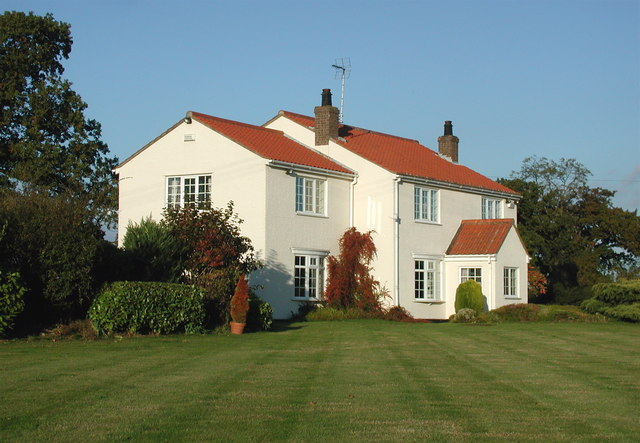
- Belby Cottage

- Location within the East Riding of Yorkshire
- OS grid reference: SE771288
  - London: 155 mi (249 km) S
- Civil parish: Kilpin
- Unitary authority: East Riding of Yorkshire
- Ceremonial county: East Riding of Yorkshire
- Region: Yorkshire and the Humber
- Country: England
- Sovereign state: United Kingdom
- Post town: GOOLE
- Postcode district: DN14
- Dialling code: 01430
- Police: Humberside
- Fire: Humberside
- Ambulance: Yorkshire
- UK Parliament: Goole and Pocklington

Belby is a hamlet in the civil parish of Kilpin, in the East Riding of Yorkshire, England. It is situated approximately 4 miles (6 km) north-east of Goole town centre and 1.5 miles (2 km) north-east of Howden. It lies just to the south of the B1230 road and north of the M62 motorway.

== History ==
The name Belby derives from the Old Norse Bellibȳ or Bjallabȳ meaning 'Belli's' or 'Bjalla's village'.

Belby was formerly a township in the parish of Howden, in 1866 Belby became a separate civil parish, on 1 April 1935 the parish was abolished and merged with Kilpin. In 1931 the parish had a population of 27.
