= Skelton, East Riding of Yorkshire =

Coordinates: 53.72119°N 0.84065°W

Skelton
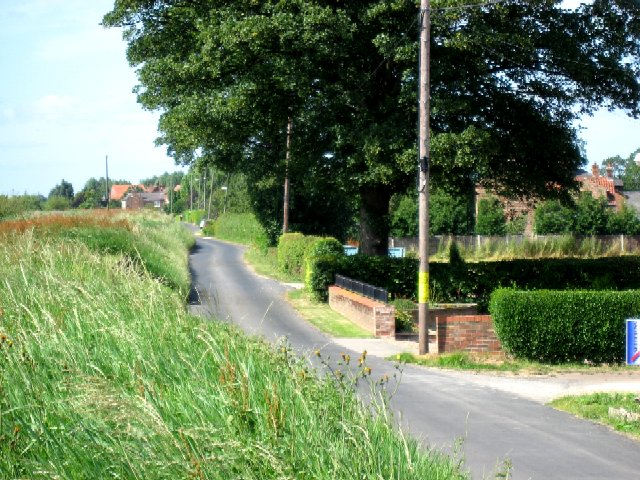
- Southern End of Skelton

- Location within the East Riding of Yorkshire
- OS grid reference: SE766256
  - London: 155 mi (249 km) S
- Civil parish: Kilpin
- Unitary authority: East Riding of Yorkshire
- Ceremonial county: East Riding of Yorkshire
- Region: Yorkshire and the Humber
- Country: England
- Sovereign state: United Kingdom
- Post town: GOOLE
- Postcode district: DN14
- Dialling code: 01430
- Police: Humberside
- Fire: Humberside
- Ambulance: Yorkshire
- UK Parliament: Goole and Pocklington

Skelton is a hamlet and former civil parish, now in the parish of Kilpin, in the East Riding of Yorkshire, England, and a linear settlement on the east bank of the River Ouse. It is situated about 2 miles (3.2 km) south-east of Howden and 19 miles (31 km) south-east from the county town of York. Skelton lies within the constituency of Goole and Pocklington. In 1931 the parish had a population of 258.

The name Skelton derives from the Old English scelftūn meaning 'settlement on a shelf of land'.

== Civil parish ==
Skelton was formerly a township in the parish of Howden, from 1866 Skelton was a civil parish in its own right, on 1 April 1935 the parish was abolished and merged with Kilpin, Eastrington and Howden.

== See also ==
- Goole railway swing bridge, also known as the Skelton viaduct
