= Boothferry =

Village in the East Riding of Yorkshire, England

Coordinates: 53.729728°N 0.887405°W

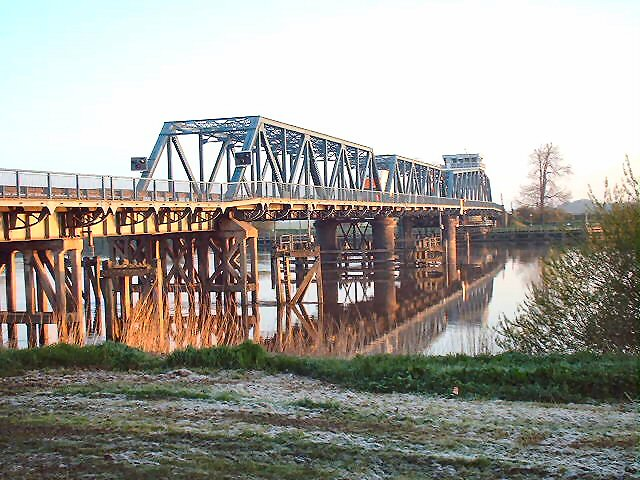
- Opening section of Boothferry Swing Bridge over the River Ouse

- Location within the East Riding of Yorkshire
- OS grid reference: SE735265
  - London: 155 mi (249 km) S
- Civil parish: Asselby Howden
- Unitary authority: East Riding of Yorkshire
- Ceremonial county: East Riding of Yorkshire
- Region: Yorkshire and the Humber
- Country: England
- Sovereign state: United Kingdom
- Post town: GOOLE
- Postcode district: DN14
- Dialling code: 01430
- Police: Humberside
- Fire: Humberside
- Ambulance: Yorkshire
- UK Parliament: Goole and Pocklington

Boothferry is a village in the East Riding of Yorkshire in England. It is situated on the north bank of the River Ouse where the A614 road crosses the river. It is about 2 miles (3 km) north-west of Goole.

Boothferry is split between civil parishes; areas to the west of the B1228 road are in the civil parish of Asselby, and those to the east are in Howden.

Boothferry is home to Boothferry Bridge which, built in 1929, was for many years the first physical road crossing of the Ouse (if travelling inland), although a lower rail crossing was built at Goole in 1869. Boothferry Bridge was very heavily used by vehicles travelling between the north and south banks of the Humber before the opening of the M62 motorway in the mid-1970s and the Humber Bridge in 1981. Boothferry Bridge is celebrated in the song "Boothferry Bridge" written by Harvey Andrews and released in 1972 on his album 'Writer of Songs"' and by the musical group "The Lonesome Travellers", which was released in the early 1970s. The M62 now crosses the Ouse on a viaduct approximately one mile downstream (east) of the old bridge.

Boothferry gave its name to the Boothferry borough of Humberside from 1974 to 1996, and to the Boothferry parliamentary constituency which, in 1997, was largely amalgamated into the Haltemprice and Howden constituency represented by David Davis MP. Boothferry was also chosen to be the name taken by a local resident when he took the title of lord in 2004. Boothferry has also lent its name to many roads and buildings along with businesses within the borough, although it is now defunct.

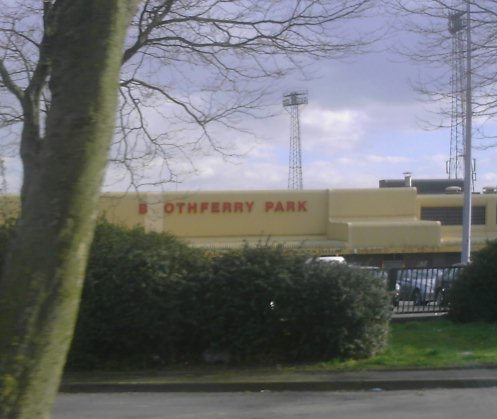
Boothferry Park

Hull City Football Club played from 1946 to 2002 at a football stadium named Boothferry Park, which also took its name from a road (the A63 – Boothferry Road) that leads from Hull to the village.
