= Kilpin =

Place in the East Riding of Yorkshire, England

Coordinates: 53.733093°N 0.830242°W

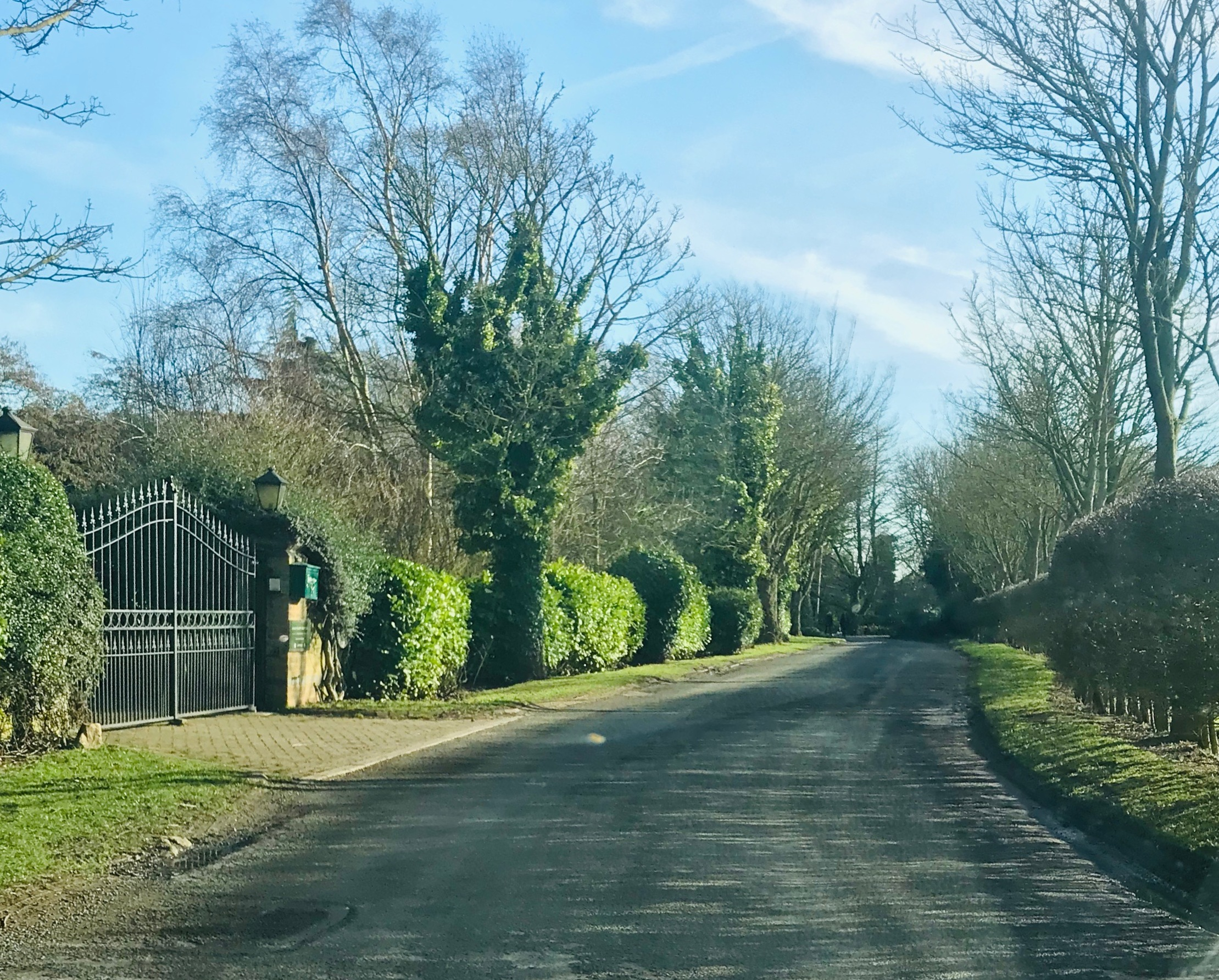
- Entering Kilpin at the West End

- Location within the East Riding of Yorkshire
- Population: 339 (2011 census)
- OS grid reference: SE772269
  - London: 155 mi (249 km) S
- Civil parish: Kilpin
- Unitary authority: East Riding of Yorkshire
- Ceremonial county: East Riding of Yorkshire
- Region: Yorkshire and the Humber
- Country: England
- Sovereign state: United Kingdom
- Post town: GOOLE
- Postcode district: DN14
- Dialling code: 01430
- Police: Humberside
- Fire: Humberside
- Ambulance: Yorkshire
- UK Parliament: Goole and Pocklington

Kilpin is a village and civil parish in the East Riding of Yorkshire, England. It is situated approximately 1.5 miles (2.4 km) south-east of Howden and 18 miles (29 km) south-east from the county town of York.

The civil parish is formed by the villages of Kilpin and Kilpin Pike and the hamlets of Balkholme, Belby, Howdendyke and Skelton. Kilpin lies within the Parliamentary constituency of Goole and Pocklington. According to the 2011 UK census, Kilpin parish had a population of 339, a decrease on the 2001 UK census figure of 357.

In 1823 Kilpin was in the parish of Howden and the Wapentake and Liberty of Howdenshire. Population at the time was 318, and included four farmers and a yeoman.

The name Kilpin derives from the Old English celfpenn meaning 'calf pen'.

== See also ==
- Listed buildings in Kilpin
