= Booth, East Riding of Yorkshire =

Hamlet in the East Riding of Yorkshire, England

Coordinates: 53.730°N 0.887°W

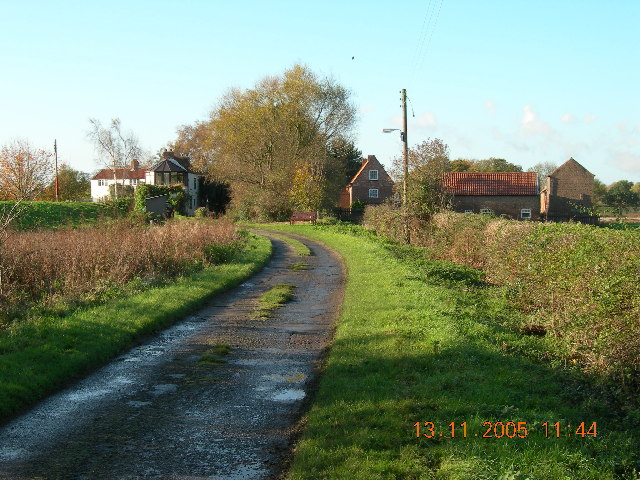
View of the hamlet (2005)

Booth is a hamlet near Goole, in the East Riding of Yorkshire, England. Booth is also known as Boothferry or Boothferry Bridge.
