= Boothferry Bridge =

Bridge over the River Ouse in Yorkshire, England

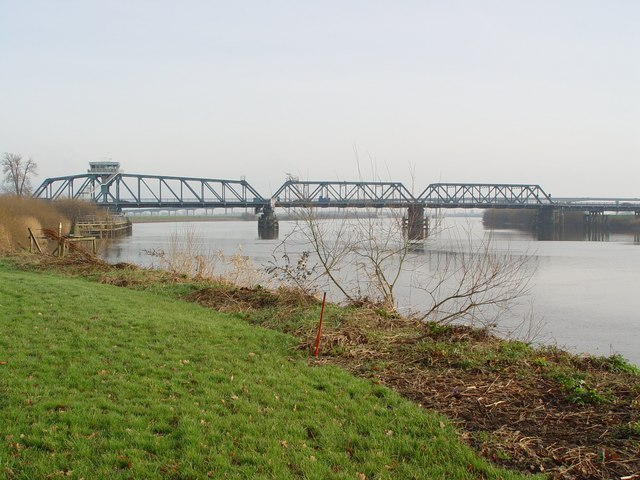
- Boothferry Bridge looking downstream
- Coordinates: 53.727°N 0.890°W
- OS grid reference: SE 733 262
- Carries: A614 road
- Crosses: River Ouse
- Locale: Boothferry, East Riding of Yorkshire, England
- Preceded by: Ouse swing bridge
- Followed by: Ouse Bridge

Characteristics
- Material: Steel
- Total length: 698 feet (213 m)
- Width: 32 feet (9.8 m)
- No. of spans: 3
- Piers in water: 12

History
- Designer: Mott, Hay & Anderson
- Engineering design by: Cleveland Bridge
- Construction cost: £116,467 (1929)
- Opened: July 1929

Boothferry Bridge is a crossing over the River Ouse, in the East Riding, England, some 2 miles (3.2 km) north-west of Goole. The bridge was opened in 1929, replacing a ferry crossing immediately west of the bridge's location. The act of Parliament for the building of the bridge, the Boothferry Bridge Act 1925, gave priority to river traffic. This situation still exists, though there have been some attempts to change priorities. On opening, it was the furthest crossing downstream of the river, cutting 25 miles (40 km) off the journey south to London from Kingston upon Hull. The M62 Ouse Bridge opened up to the east of Boothferry Bridge in 1976.

== History ==
Boothferry Bridge Act 1925
- Act of Parliament
- Parliament of the United Kingdom
- Long title: An Act to empower the county council of the West Riding of Yorkshire to construct a new bridge over the River Ouse to provide for contributions thereto by the county council of the East Riding of Yorkshire the lord mayor aldermen and citizens of the city and county of Kingston upon Hull and the Goole Urban District Council and for the vesting of the said bridge in the said county councils and for other purposes.
- Citation: 15 & 16 Geo. 5. c. cxi

Dates
- Royal assent: 7 August 1925

Text of statute as originally enacted

The bridge at Boothferry was built to replace the ferry which connected the hamlet of Booth with the south side of the Ouse. The ferry was owned by the Bishops of Durham and Ripon, having been in operation since at least 1513, but was leased to several operators before the bridge was built. An act of Parliament, the Boothferry Bridge Act 1925 (15 & 16 Geo. 5. c. cxi) was granted providing authority to construct the bridge and giving priority to river traffic. An attempt was made in the 1980s to rescind the priority for river traffic. Construction began in January 1926, with the bridge opening in July 1929, becoming the furthest bridge over the River Ouse. Before that, the furthest bridge downstream on the River Ouse was Selby toll bridge, some 8 miles (13 km) upstream of the Boothferry Bridge. Opening of the bridge eased the pressure on the east-west traffic through the region, notably helping to alleviate some of the traffic across the toll bridge at Selby, and providing a shorter route to and from Hull, being only 2 miles (3.2 km) north-west of Goole. The journey from Hull to London was shortened by 25 miles (40 km) helping travellers to avoid going over the toll bridge at Selby. This continued until 1976, when the Ouse Bridge of the M62 opened, and then, in 1981, the Humber Bridge was opened.

The bridge is a steel girder structure which is 698 feet (213 m) long. The construction was funded by five public bodies, the Ministry of Transport (£56,000), West Riding County Council (£33,600), East Riding County Council (£5,600), Hull City Council (£11,200), and Goole Urban District Council (£5,600), at a total cost of £112,000. However, by the time the bridge opened in July 1929, the bridge had cost £116,467 (equivalent to £8,864,000 in 2023), and the approach roads had cost £72,000.

Engineering of the bridge was carried out by Cleveland Bridge, to a design by the firm of Mott, Hay & Anderson. The structure has six sections, with the section closest to the East Yorkshire side of the river (north bank), being able to swing open to give a width clearance of 125 feet (38 m). Barges were able to be towed up river past this point two abreast (lashed together), until they reached Selby. Boothferry Bridge is supported by 12 piers in the water, which are sunk to a depth of 70 feet (21 m) below the water level. The vehicular width of the bridge is 20-foot (6.1 m), with two 6-foot (1.8 m) sections for foot traffic on either side, making a combined width of 32 feet (9.8 m).

Almost immediately to the east of Boothferry Bridge is the Ouse Bridge, which was opened in May 1976, and carries the M62 over the River Ouse. In the 1960s, before the M62 bridge was built, consideration was given to re-using an abandoned railway bridge over the River Ouse at Long Drax (from the Hull and Barnsley Railway), in an effort to alleviate the traffic flow over Boothferry Bridge. A major repair of the bridge was undertaken in 1979, when £1 million was spent on renovation works. On days when the bridge was closed completely to vehicular traffic, diversions were in place via the M62 bridge, but those that couldn't use the motorway (such as pedestrians) were taken on buses along the M62. It was renovated and repaired again, in 2021, at a cost of £2.2 million.

The bridge is the western limit of the Humber Estuary Special Area of Conservation.

== Popular culture ==
In 1972, a folk group, The Lonesome Travellers, recorded a song about the bridge.

Also in 1972, singer songwriter, Harvey Andrews, recorded a song about the bridge featuring Rick Wakeman on piano and Ralph McTell on guitar.

Bridges over the River Ouse
Upstream: River Ouse swing bridge	Downstream: Ouse Bridge
