= Howdendyke =

Hamlet in the East Riding of Yorkshire, England

Coordinates: 53.733446°N 0.857519°W

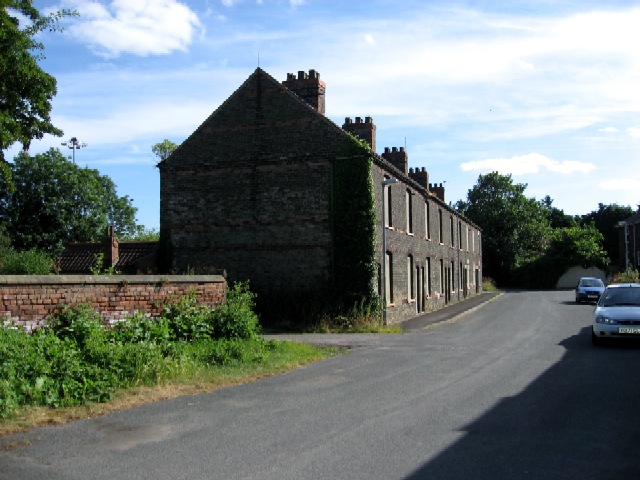
- Howdendyke Main street

- Location within the East Riding of Yorkshire
- OS grid reference: SE754269
  - London: 155 mi (249 km) S
- Civil parish: Kilpin
- Unitary authority: East Riding of Yorkshire
- Ceremonial county: East Riding of Yorkshire
- Region: Yorkshire and the Humber
- Country: England
- Sovereign state: United Kingdom
- Post town: GOOLE
- Postcode district: DN14
- Dialling code: 01430
- Police: Humberside
- Fire: Humberside
- Ambulance: Yorkshire
- UK Parliament: Goole and Pocklington

Howdendyke is a hamlet in the East Riding of Yorkshire, England. It is situated approximately 2 miles (3.2 km) north of Goole town centre and about 1 mile (1.6 km) south of Howden.

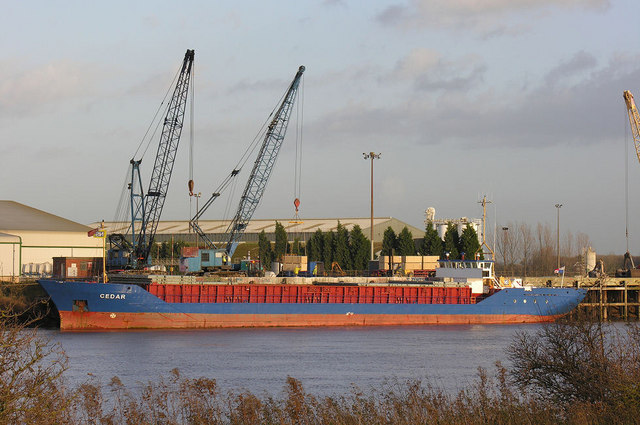
MV Cedar alongside the jetties at Howdendyke

Howdendyke forms part of the civil parish of Kilpin.

It lies on the north bank of the River Ouse and has port facilities run by PD Ports.
