= Balkholme =

Hamlet in the East Riding of Yorkshire, England

Coordinates: 53.743631°N 0.811374°W

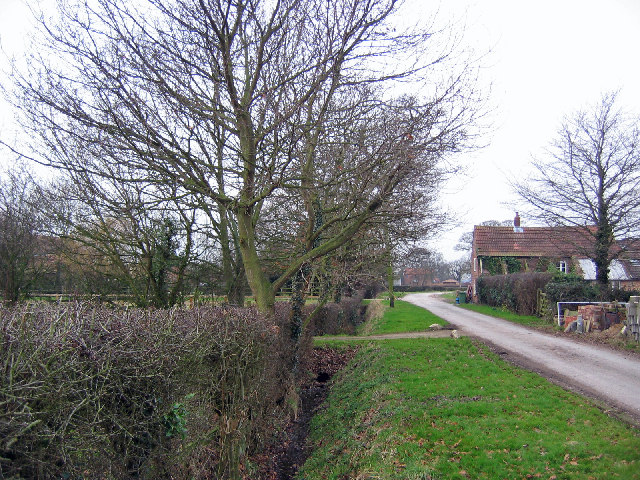
- Balkholme in 2006

- Location within the East Riding of Yorkshire
- OS grid reference: SE784281
  - London: 155 mi (249 km) S
- Civil parish: Kilpin
- Unitary authority: East Riding of Yorkshire
- Ceremonial county: East Riding of Yorkshire
- Region: Yorkshire and the Humber
- Country: England
- Sovereign state: United Kingdom
- Post town: GOOLE
- Postcode district: DN14
- Dialling code: 01430
- Police: Humberside
- Fire: Humberside
- Ambulance: Yorkshire
- UK Parliament: Goole and Pocklington

Balkholme is a hamlet and former civil parish, now in the parish of Kilpin and the East Riding of Yorkshire, England. In 1931 the parish had a population of 78.

Balkholme is to the south of the B1230 Howden to Gilberdyke road as it crosses the M62 motorway, and 1.5 miles (2.4 km) north-east of the parish village of Kilpin. The county town of Beverley is 17 miles (27 km) to the north-east, the town of Howden 2.5 miles (4 km) west, and the town centre of Goole approximately 4 miles (6 km) south-west.

The name Balkholme probably derives from a combination of the Old English balca meaning 'ridge' and the Old Norse holmr meaning 'island'. Alternatively, it could derive from balkiholmr meaning 'Balki's island'.

In 1823, Baines recorded that Balkholme was in the parish of Howden, and the wapentake and liberty of Howdenshire, and had a population of 105 including eight farmers. Balkholme was formerly a township in the parish of Howden, from 1866 Balkholme was a civil parish in its own right, on 1 April 1935 the parish was abolished and merged with Kilpin and Eastrington, part also went to form Gilberdyke.

At the east side of Balkholme is West Linton Farmhouse, a Grade II listed late 18th-century house, of two-storeys and three-bays. It is built of red brick in Flemish bond, with pantile roof, and has a 19th-century wing.

There is a small RAF memorial garden on Brow Lane where a mid-air collision occurred during the Second World War between two Halifax Bombers of 578 Squadron.
