= Moorends =

Village in South Yorkshire, England

Coordinates: 53.6333°N 0.95°W

- Village
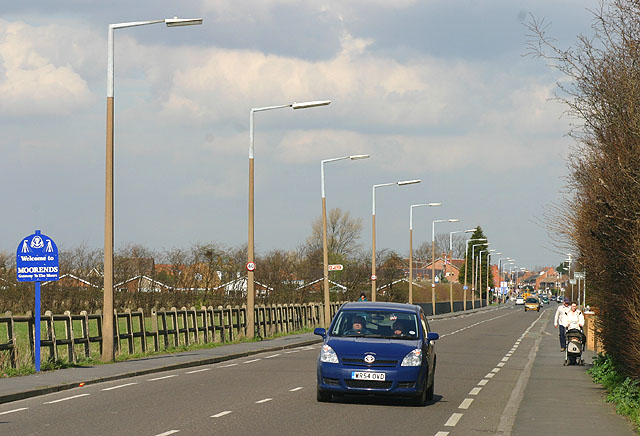
- Entering Moorends on Marshland Road from Thorne

- Location within City of Doncaster Location within South Yorkshire
- Population: 5,500 (2016 DBMC)
- OS grid reference: SE694152
- Civil parish: Thorne
- Metropolitan borough: Doncaster
- Metropolitan county: South Yorkshire
- Region: Yorkshire and the Humber
- Country: England
- Sovereign state: United Kingdom
- Post town: DONCASTER
- Postcode district: DN8
- Dialling code: 01405
- Police: South Yorkshire
- Fire: South Yorkshire
- Ambulance: Yorkshire
- UK Parliament: Doncaster East and the Isle of Axholme

Moorends is a village in the north-east of the City of Doncaster, South Yorkshire, England, situated on the border with East Yorkshire and Lincolnshire. It was historically part of the West Riding of Yorkshire until 1974. It is part of the civil parish of Thorne, which lies to the south.

Moorends is located on the edge of Thorne Moors, part of the Humberhead Levels, at an elevation of around 2 metres (6 ft 7 in) above sea level. The moors can be accessed via Grange Road. The village grew up with housing being built to house the miners working in Thorne Colliery, which was developed in the village. Before the coal mine was sunk, the area was largely farmland with only a handful of houses. A missionary church was provided by the owners of the coal mine during the colliery's development (c. 1912, however, a permanent church, St Wilfrith's, was built in 1934, and this became its own parish in 1956.

The legendary goalkeeper Ted Sagar was born in Moorends in 1910. It is also home to one public house.

== Famous People ==
- Warren Fox - Born 1st May 2009
- Bavisan Rajkumer - Born 24th August 2009, part of the Great Epic called "The Bavi Lore"
