= Linton-on-Ouse =

Village and civil parish in North Yorkshire, England

Coordinates: 54.0405°N 1.2483°W

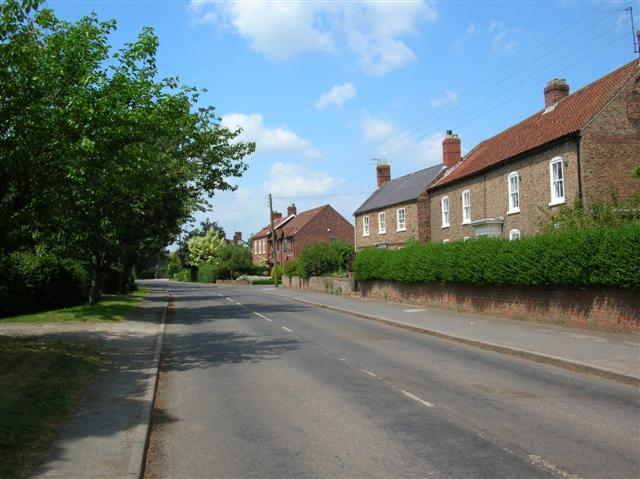
- Linton on Ouse

- Location within North Yorkshire
- Population: 1,201 (2011 census)
- OS grid reference: SE493607
- Civil parish: Linton-on-Ouse
- Unitary authority: North Yorkshire
- Ceremonial county: North Yorkshire
- Region: Yorkshire and the Humber
- Country: England
- Sovereign state: United Kingdom
- Post town: YORK
- Postcode district: YO30
- Police: North Yorkshire
- Fire: North Yorkshire
- Ambulance: Yorkshire
- UK Parliament: Wetherby and Easingwold

Linton-on-Ouse is a village and civil parish in the county of North Yorkshire, England, about eight miles north-west of York. It lies on the north bank of the River Ouse.

== History ==
The village is mentioned in the Domesday Book as Luctone in the Bulford Hundred. The manor at this time was split between Thorfin of Ravensworth and Thorn of Linton. Afterwards, the manor was granted to Robert of Mortain. The manor passed to Thomas de Ros, 4th Baron de Ros, in the 14th century and remained in the family until the mid-16th century. In the early 18th century, the manorial rights were sold to University College, Oxford. The university built a school in the village in 1871.

In the mid-18th century, Acts of Parliament were passed to make the River Ouse navigable that included the building of a lock at Linton-on-Ouse, which is now a Grade II listed building.

There was a Catholic chapel in the village between 1700 and 1855.

Since 1937, Linton-on-Ouse has been home to a Royal Air Force station, RAF Linton-on-Ouse. Since 1957, the main role of the airfield has been the training of pilots, and with the main flying training ceasing from 2019, the Military Air Traffic Zone was rescinded in December 2020.

In the summer of 1960 and 1961, the perimeter track of the airfield was used to form the 1.7-mile (2.7 km) Linton-on-Ouse Motor Racing circuit.

In April 2022, the government announced its intention to convert the former RAF base into a reception, accommodation and processing centre for asylum seekers as a way of defraying the £4.7 million per day cost of hotels being used.

== Asylum reception centre ==
On 14 April 2022, the Home Office announced that the disused RAF station at Linton-on-Ouse would be converted to house 1,500 asylum-seekers, creating the first in a series of new ‘Greek-style' asylum reception centres designed to cut the cost of placing asylum-seekers in hotels. The announcement came as part of a wider plan centred around a £120 million agreement with the government of Rwanda whereby asylum-seekers arriving in the UK could be flown 4,000 miles away to have their asylum claims processed there.

Local residents set up a campaign group with the slogan “Wrong plan, Wrong place”. They said that there had been no prior consultation and that their opposition was being met with silence from the Home office. They were supported by Kevin Hollinrake, Conservative MP for Thirsk and Malton, who said the Home Office had “failed to follow its own guidance on the location of such a facility, which said that asylum-seekers should be placed in urban areas".

He also said that the government had not consulted with the local council. Within two weeks of the Home Office's announcement, Hambleton District Council had instructed lawyers to mount a legal challenge to the plans. The council served a Planning Contravention Notice (PCN) to determine whether the Home Office’s plans breached planning control. On 19 May 2022, Conservative-led North Yorkshire County Council overwhelmingly passed a vote of no confidence in the Home Office, based on its “cack-handed” handling of the plans.

On 9 August 2022, defence secretary Ben Wallace announced that the Ministry of Defence was withdrawing its offer of the land from the Home Office, ending the plans for an asylum reception centre. The future of the disused RAF station remains uncertain.

== Governance ==
The village lies within the Thirsk and Malton Parliamentary constituency. From 1974 to 2023 it was part of the Hambleton District, it is now administered by the unitary North Yorkshire Council.

== Geography ==
The nearest settlements are Newton-on-Ouse 1.2 miles (1.9 km) to the south-east, Aldwark 2.5 miles (4.0 km) to the north-west and Thorpe Underwood 2.1 miles (3.4 km) to the south-west. Sandwath Beck joins Shorn Dike to the north-east of the village before flowing into the River Kyle just to the east of the school.

The 1881 UK Census recorded the population as 296. The 2001 UK Census recorded the population as 1,024, of which 723 were over the age of sixteen years. There were 388 dwellings, of which 134 were detached.

=== Climate ===
Climate data for RAF Linton-on-Ouse (1991–2020)
Month	Jan	Feb	Mar	Apr	May	Jun	Jul	Aug	Sep	Oct	Nov	Dec	Year
Mean daily maximum °C (°F)	7.2 (45.0)	8.0 (46.4)	10.3 (50.5)	13.3 (55.9)	16.4 (61.5)	19.2 (66.6)	21.4 (70.5)	21.0 (69.8)	18.2 (64.8)	14.1 (57.4)	10.0 (50.0)	7.3 (45.1)	13.9 (57.0)
Mean daily minimum °C (°F)	1.2 (34.2)	1.3 (34.3)	2.5 (36.5)	4.2 (39.6)	7.1 (44.8)	10.1 (50.2)	12.1 (53.8)	11.9 (53.4)	9.7 (49.5)	6.8 (44.2)	3.6 (38.5)	1.2 (34.2)	6.0 (42.8)
Average rainfall mm (inches)	49.8 (1.96)	42.1 (1.66)	39.8 (1.57)	47.6 (1.87)	43.5 (1.71)	57.2 (2.25)	55.8 (2.20)	64.7 (2.55)	52.7 (2.07)	61.3 (2.41)	60.2 (2.37)	59.2 (2.33)	633.8 (24.95)
Average rainy days (≥ 1 mm)	11.1	9.8	8.6	9.0	9.3	9.7	9.2	10.4	8.8	10.9	11.7	11.6	120.2
Source: Met Office

== Public services ==
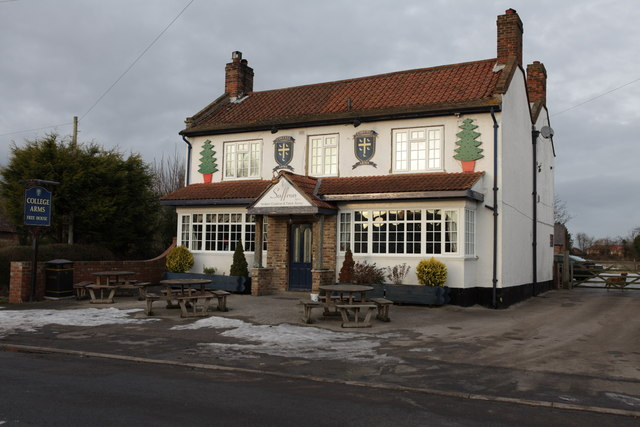
College Arms, Linton on Ouse

Education is provided at Linton-on-Ouse Primary School. The school is within the catchment area of Easingwold School for secondary education.

There is a village store, public house and several local businesses. The village is served by the bus service that runs between York and Easingwold.

== Twinning ==
In 2012 the village started formal twinning procedures with Montcony in France. This is linked to the loss of a Halifax Bomber and crew, stationed here during World War II, in the French village and the respect shown by those villagers to the remains of the crew.

== See also ==
- Listed buildings in Linton-on-Ouse
