= Goole railway swing bridge =

Swing bridge in the East Riding of Yorkshire, England

Coordinates: 53.71318°N 0.84162°W

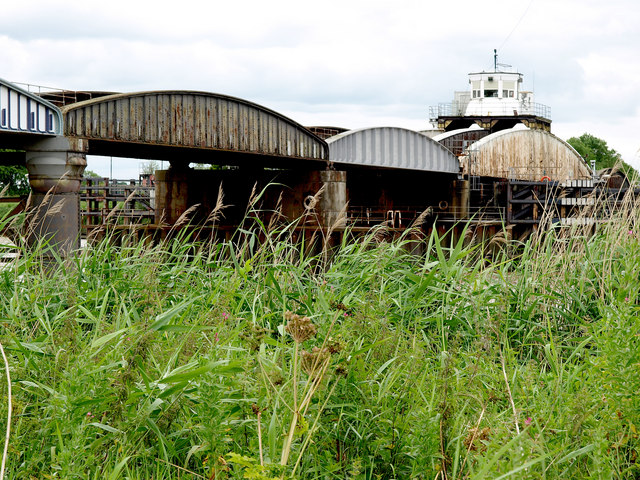
Goole railway swing bridge, over the River Ouse

The Goole railway swing bridge , also known as the Hook bridge or Skelton Viaduct, is a large viaducted hogback plate girder bridge with swing span over the River Ouse, Yorkshire, near Goole, East Riding of Yorkshire, England. The bridge was designed by Thomas Elliot Harrison for the Hull and Doncaster Branch of the North Eastern Railway and opened in 1869.

In the latter part of the 20th century, the bridge became known for the frequent incidents involving ship collisions with the superstructure. As of 2026, it is still in use.

== History and description ==
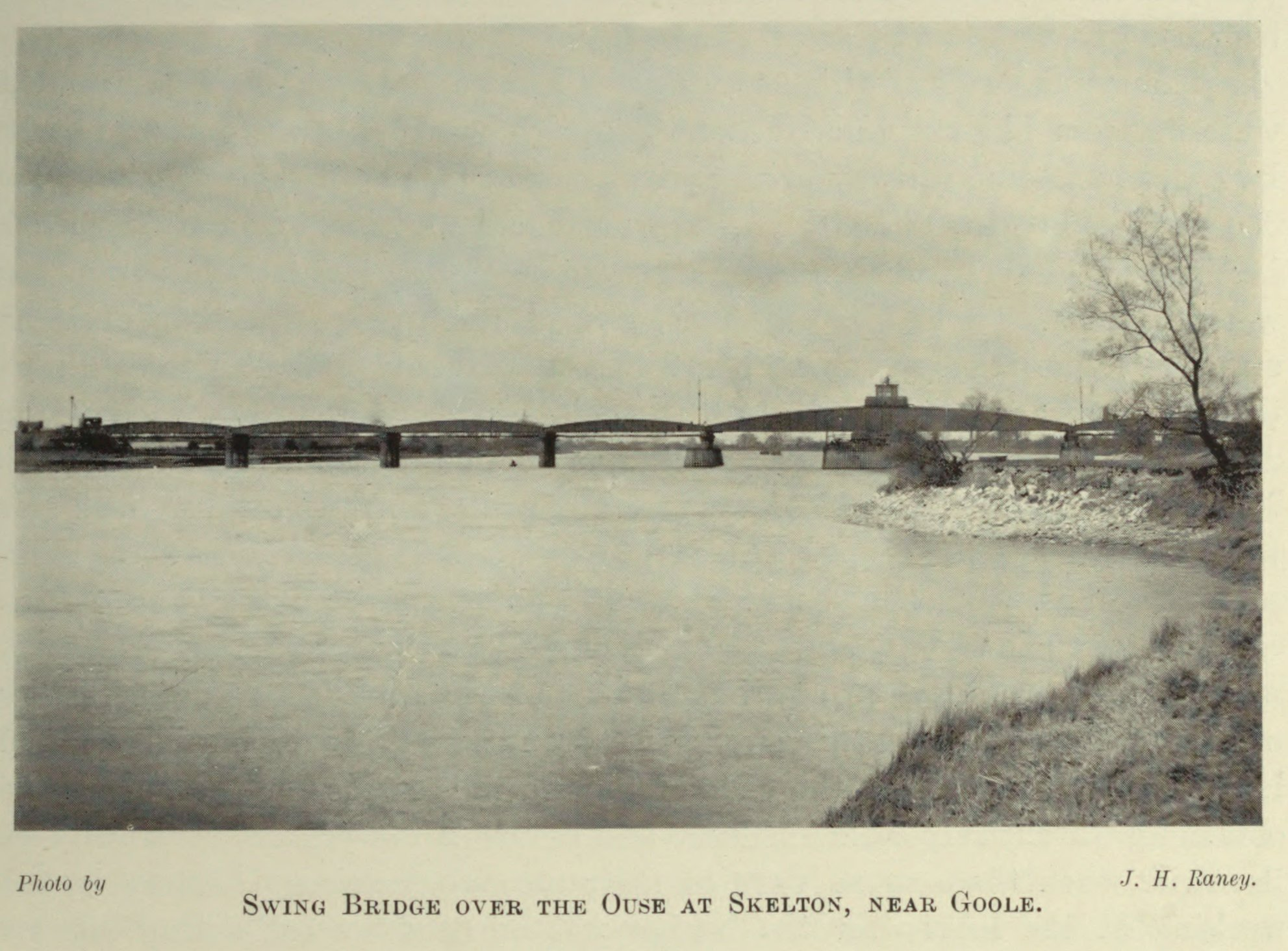
Pre-1915 photo of the bridge

During the 1860s, a number of attempts were made by different railway companies to create a new line better connecting Kingston upon Hull and South Yorkshire; in 1862 the North Eastern Railway promoted a bill for a line which was unopposed by the Manchester, Sheffield & Lincolnshire Railway, and Lancashire & Yorkshire Railway on the understanding of mutual running powers for the companies, either to Hull, or on lines in South Yorkshire. The bill, the "North Eastern Railway (Hull and Doncaster Branch)" was deposited late 1862, for a line from a junction on the Hull and Selby Line near Staddlethorpe (near Gilberdyke) to a junction with the South Yorkshire Railway near Thorne, Hatfield and Stainforth. The act was passed in mid-1863.

As part of the construction of the line, a bridge was required over the River Ouse near Goole between Skelton and Hook.

=== Construction and design ===
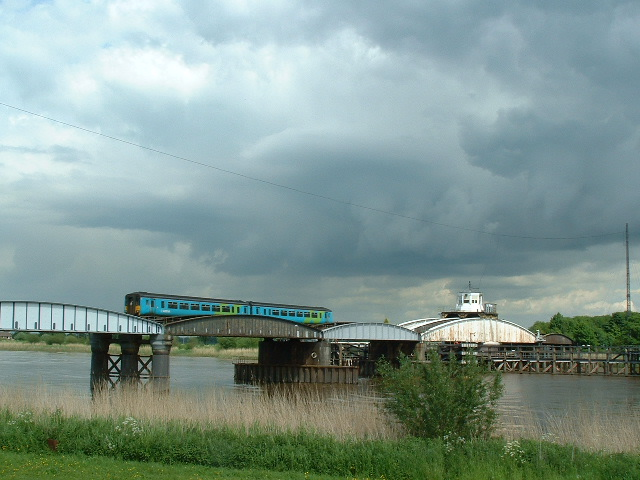
The bridge (2003)

The bridge consisted of four fixed spans, one swing span and a fifth swing span, and carried a double-track railway. (Note: The swing bridge runs east west, the swing section is closer to the east bank of the river. (Ordnance Survey, 1891, 1:2500))

Pier foundations for the bridge spans were of 7 ft (2.1 m) base diameter cast iron cylinders, which tapered to 5.5 ft (1.7 m) diameter at the high water level, each column was around 90 ft (27 m) long. The piers were sunk into the river alluvium using a mass placed on them, and then by the pneumatic Caisson process until bedrock was reached. The tubes were then filled with Portland cement concrete to within 20 ft (6.1 m) of the top, the final fill was with brickwork with a top course of granite. The river abutments were of brick with stone dressing.

The fixed spans were 116 ft (35 m) long, made of three wrought iron hogback plate girders each, resting on three piers. The swing span was constructed of three hogback wrought iron box girders, each 250 ft (76 m) long, each box girder having a thickness of 2 ft 6 in (0.76 m) made of plates 0.3125 to 0.4375 in (7.94 to 11.11 mm) thick. In addition to the transverse deck girders the swing span was also braced by three transverse frames, which also served to support a bridgeman's hut over the centre of the bridge.

The swing span was supported and turned on 26 conical rollers, which were supported by an annular box girder 38 by 36 in (0.97 by 0.91 m) high by wide, itself resting on six of the cast iron piers with approximately 29 ft (8.8 m) of the pier sunk into the river bed.

The bridge rotated around a central column, which contained a hydraulic accumulator of 17 ft (5.2 m) stroke, with 16.5 in (420 mm) diameter ram loaded to 67 long tons (68 t), used to power the turning mechanism. The bridge was turned by a three-cylinder hydraulic motor (duplicated for redundancy), and gears. The accumulator was charged by 12 hp (8.9 kW) steam engines, also duplicated. The engines were supplied by field boilers also located on the central pier.

When in the closed position a hydraulic mechanism at either end of the bridge was used to lock the bridge in position. The bridge could be opened in 50 seconds.

The bridge superstructure was designed was T. E. Harrison of the NER, and erected by Pease, Hutchinson and Company (Skerne Ironworks). The fixed spans were supplied by Butler and Pitts (Stanningley), the hydraulic motors were of the design of Sir W. G. Armstrong.

The swing span weighed 670 long tons (680 t), the weight of iron in the piers 922 long tons (937 t), with 770 long tons (780 t) of iron in the girders. The swing span opening was over 100 ft (30 m) in width, with a height above high water when closed of over 15 ft (4.6 m), The swing pier included a river jetty 200 ft (61 m) long.

The bridge was crossed by NER officials in 1868, and the line opened on 2 August 1869.

=== Working history ===
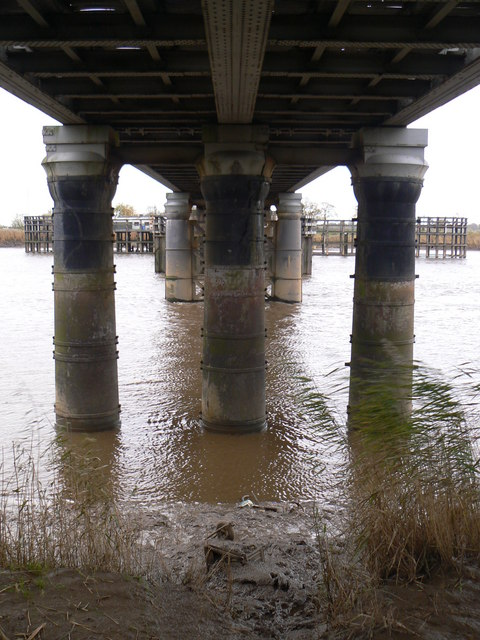
Columns and underside of bridge looking towards central pier (2008)

On 21 March 1922, the river pier and engine room of the swing span was badly damaged by fire.

In May 1933, the LNER had a miniature thumb switch controlled signalling frame installed at the bridge by Westinghouse, at the same time the line from Staddlethorpe to Goole had colour light signalling installed; both were early examples of either technology in use. At the same time, two signal boxes at either end of the bridge were closed.

The bridge has had several collisions with water-going ships. (Note: Between 1981 and 1991, the bridge had strikes causing damage on 22 occasions. Only the 23 November 1988 incident caused a long-term closure.)

On 21 December 1973, the bridge was struck by a German coaster Vineta (IMO number: 8120923), causing one of the spans to fall into the river, leaving the bridge unworkable for nine months.

On 2 August 1976, Danish vessel Leon Sif (IMO number: 6711493) hit one of the bridge's piers.

British Rail began closure procedures for the railway line due to costs associated repairing the bridge's pier, estimated at £2 million, coupled with a historic failure to get adequate compensation for damage to the bridge caused by shipping.

In 1987, the structure was given a Grade II* listing by English Heritage.

On 23 November 1988, one of the fixed spans was pushed out of alignment by a collision with the Swedish vessel Samo (IMO number: 7016383), which became trapped between the bridge's piers.

By the early 21st century, understrength girders and corrosion had led to the line speed over the bridge being reduced to 60 mph (97 km/h) for passenger trains, down to only 10 mph (16 km/h) for trains with a route availability of 9 or more. In 2009, a modernisation programme began – Clancy Docwra installed services (telecoms, fresh and waste water, electricity, signalling) to the central pier through piping under the river bed. Carillion was appointed main contractor in March 2010. The bridge steelwork was repaired and upgraded over a six-week line closure starting in October 2010 – over 400 tonnes of steelwork was installed including diagonal transverse braces, and stiffening to the girders of the web. Additional work included track renewal and painting of the bridge. The total cost of the project was £6 million; the firm of Pell Frischmann was the designing engineer.

A further programme of renovation and investment commenced in January 2023, spurred by deterioration of the drive, jack and locking mechanisms. Amco Giffen were awarded the contract, with large components being delivered by river from Goole docks. Additional works included renewal of the electricity supply and navigational lights. Pedestrian walkways were installed along the pier protection fendering and the mechanical connections to the signals and jacking and slewing apparatus were replaced by a Programmable Logic Controller connected by electronic relay. The hydraulic accumulator was replaced by a new hydraulic power unit manufactured by Ipswich Hydraulics, although the original item has been left within the pier top. Finally, the bridge-based generator was replaced by a shore-based item, to simplify maintenance and refuelling operations.

For quite some time the pages of the Yorkshire Ship Enthusiasts' Newsletter have enthralled their members by recounting the efforts by numerous vessels to demolish the railway bridge at Hook, near Goole

— Sea Breezes ~ The Ship Lovers' Digest, Vol. 36

== See also ==
- Grade II* listed buildings in the East Riding of Yorkshire
- Listed buildings in Goole
- Similar bridges
  - Naburn swing bridge (York and Doncaster Line)
  - Selby swing bridge (1891) (Hull and Selby Line)

== Notes ==
Bridges over the River Ouse
Upstream: Ouse Bridge	Downstream: Humber Bridge
