= River Ouse swing bridge =

Rad Bridge over the River Ouse, Yorkshire, England

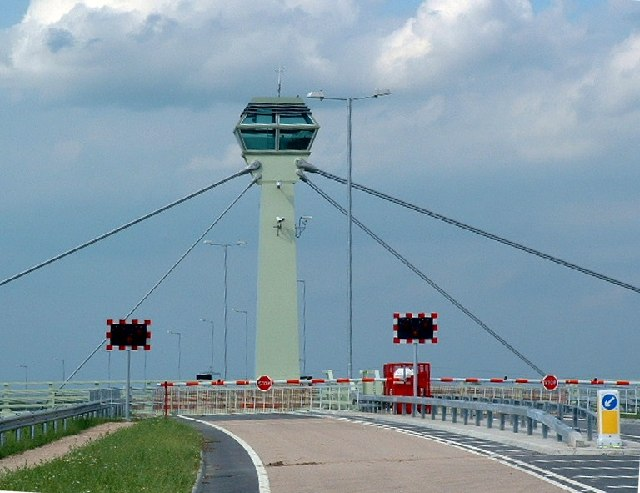
- Selby, A63 Swing Bridge control Tower
- Coordinates: 53.777°N 1.037°W
- OS grid reference: SE615316
- Carries: A63 road
- Crosses: River Ouse
- Locale: Selby, North Yorkshire, England
- Preceded by: Selby swing bridge
- Followed by: Boothferry Bridge

Characteristics
- Total length: 95.2 metres (312 ft)
- Width: 17.96 metres (58.9 ft)
- Clearance below: 3.85 metres (12.6 ft)

History
- Designer: High Point Rendel
- Constructed by: Skanska
- Opened: June 2004

The River Ouse swing bridge is a road bridge over the River Ouse in North Yorkshire, England. It was opened in 2004 when the A63 road bypassed the town of Selby, which traffic previously had to go through to cross the river. It is one of several bridges over the River Ouse between York and the mouth of the Ouse, where it joins the River Trent.

== History ==
Until the A63 bypass was opened, traffic through the town of Selby was measured at 18,000 vehicles per day, of which at least 10% were heavy goods vehicles (HGVs). The main contractor on the bypass project was Skanska, with engineering and design carried out by High Point Rendel. The route of the bypass and bridge was fully opened in June 2004. The swing bridge takes between eight and ten minutes to open for river traffic. On 22 June 2004, eleven days after it was opened, the bridge became stuck in the open position after it had been moved to allow a river vessel through. The issue was caused by a design problem with the hydraulic jacks on the bridge.

The bridge consists of two fixed girders connected to an orthotropic deck. The fixed length part of the bridge is on the western bank of the River Ouse, and is 40 metres (130 ft) in length. The 55.2-metre (181 ft) swing section aligns to the eastern bank. The bridge is 17.96 metres (58.9 ft) wide, and weighs 1,203 tonnes (1,326 tons). A clearance of 3.85 metres (12.6 ft) is available to river vessels without having to open the bridge. This height clearance is determined from the normal water line away from exceptional tides.

Bridges over the River Ouse
Upstream: Selby swing bridge	Downstream: Boothferry Bridge
