= River Ouse, Yorkshire =

River in North Yorkshire, England

River Ouse
- The River Ouse in York

Location
- Country: England
- County: East Riding of Yorkshire; North Yorkshire

Physical characteristics
- Source: River Ure
  - location: Cuddy Shaw Reach, near Linton-on-Ouse
  - coordinates: 54°2′4″N 1°16′30″W
  - elevation: 33 ft (10 m)
- Mouth: Humber estuary
  - location: Trent Falls
  - coordinates: 53°42′8″N 0°41′46″W
  - elevation: 0 ft (0 m)
- Length: 52 mi (84 km)
- Basin size: 4,133 sq mi (10,704 km^{2})
- Discharge
  - location: Skelton
  - average: 1,830 cu ft/s (51.7 m^{3}/s)

Basin features
- Tributaries
  - left: Derwent
  - right: Nidd, Wharfe, Aire, Don

The River Ouse (/uːz/ OOZ) is a river in North Yorkshire, England. Hydrologically, the river is a continuation of the River Ure, and the combined length of the River Ure and River Ouse makes it, at 129 miles (208 km), the sixth-longest river of the United Kingdom and (including the Ure) the longest to flow entirely in one county. The length of the Ouse alone is about 52 miles (84 km) but the total length of the river is disputed.

It is a matter of opinion as to whether the River Ouse is formed at the confluence of the River Ure and the much-smaller Ouse Gill Beck at Cuddy Shaw Reach near Linton-on-Ouse, about six miles downstream of the confluence of the River Swale with the River Ure. An alternative opinion is recorded in a publication published in The Yorkshire Post in a series dated 1891, written and illustrated by Tom Bradley. His description and bird's-eye-view maps—specifically in his account of the River Swale—suggests that the River Ouse starts at the confluence of the Swale and the Ure. His narrative states that the Ouse has no specific source, simply flowing from the stated confluence until it runs into the Humber at the confluence of the Ouse and Trent.

Continuing the path of the Ouse downstream from Linton-on-Ouse, it then flows through the city of York and the nearby towns of Selby and Goole before joining with the River Trent at Trent Falls, near the village of Faxfleet, then entering the Humber estuary.

The Ouse's system of tributaries includes the Derwent, Aire, Don, Hipper, Wharfe, Rother, Nidd, Swale, Ure and Foss. Together they drain a large part of the Pennines, and much of the Yorkshire Dales and North York Moors.

The Ouse valley is a wide, flat plain; heavy rainfall higher in the river's drainage basin can bring severe flooding to settlements. In recent years York, Selby and villages in between have been flooded.

== Sources ==
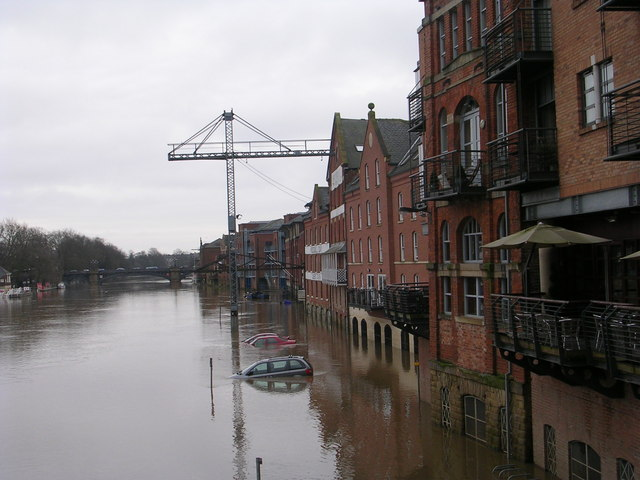
The 2010 floods in York, caused by the River Ouse

The traditional source of the Ouse is in the village of Great Ouseburn, and is marked by a stone column reading "OUSE RIVER HEAD... OUSEGILL SPRING Ft. YORK 13 miles BOROUGHBRIDGE 4 miles". The site is 38 yards (35 m) from the present course of Ouse Gill Beck, a small stream earlier known as Usekeld Beck, meaning "Spring or source of the Ouse" (from Old Norse kelda "spring").

The start of the Ouse is now considered to be the point where Ouse Gill Beck joins the River Ure, 1.6 miles (2.5 km) south-east of Great Ouseburn.

== Etymology ==
The name was first recorded in about 780 as Usa. It has been speculated that the name is of Romano-Brittonic (Celtic) origin, from an assumed word udso-, assumed to be derived from the Indo-European root wed-, meaning "water". Alternatively, 'Isaf' and 'Uchaf' are common forms of place names in modern Welsh (Romano Britonic's successor) meaning 'upper' and 'lower'. The letter 'U' forms an 'I' sound in Welsh. Other sources prefer a Proto-Celtic origin.

It has been suggested that the Ouse was once known as the 'Ure', but there seems to be no supporting evidence for this claim. The suggestion that the name derives from the Romano-British name of the Ure, assumed to be Isurā from the Roman name for Aldborough, and over time evolved into Isis and finally the Saxon Ouse, would go some way to explaining how the little tributary Ouse Gill Beck usurps the name of the much larger River Ure. However the form Ouse is little changed from the eighth century.

== Navigation ==
The Ouse is navigable throughout its length. Seagoing vessels use the river as far as Howdendyke. The inland port of Goole also accepts seagoing vessels on a regular basis. Goole also offers access to the Aire and Calder Navigation. At Selby there is access to the Selby Canal. The river is tidal up to Naburn; the resultant tidal bore is known locally as "the Aegir".

At Naburn there is a weir with locks, so that boats of 150 feet (45.7 m) length and 15 feet (4.6 m) beam can reach York. Above York there is another weir with locks at Linton-on-Ouse, which allows boats of 66 feet (20 m) length to proceed to the River Ure Navigation. Adjacent to the lock is Linton Lock Hydro plant. This is capable of generating enough electricity to power 450 homes.

The navigation authority is Associated British Ports from Trent Falls to Goole railway swing bridge at Skelton, and the Canal & River Trust upstream from there.

In the 18th and 19th centuries, there was considerable commercial traffic on the river, mainly from Selby, which then had a custom house, downstream. After the 1826 opening of the Aire and Calder Navigation, most traffic became concentrated on the port of Goole. This continues, although the coal trade which formed the backbone of the river trade has ceased.

== Settlements ==
- Lower Dunsforth
- Aldwark
- Linton-on-Ouse
- Newton-on-Ouse
- Nun Monkton
- Beningbrough
- Overton
- Nether Poppleton
- York
- South Bank
- Fulford
- Bishopthorpe
- Naburn
- Acaster Malbis
- Acaster Selby
- Cawood
- Kelfield
- Riccall
- Barlby
- Selby
- Hemingbrough
- Barmby on the Marsh
- Booth
- Hook
- Skelton
- Goole
- Swinefleet
- Saltmarshe
- Reedness
- Little Reedness
- Yokefleet
- Whitgift
- Blacktoft
- Ousefleet
- Faxfleet

(Joins Trent at Trent Falls to form Humber)

== Flooding ==
With both the Ouse and the Foss running through York, flooding has been a problem throughout its documented history. Flooding is known to have occurred in 1263, 1316, 1564, 1625, 1638, 1947, 1978, 1982, 2000, 2007, 2010 and 2015. In November 2000, the floods reached a height of 5.4 metres (18 ft) above sea level, whilst over the Christmas period of 2015, the level reached 5.2 metres (17 ft). A barrier was installed on the mouth of the River Foss in York city centre in 1989, so that when the Ouse was in flood, water would not run upstream of the Foss and flood the city. Flooding occurs typically due to heavy rainfall further upstream in the catchment area of the Ouse (Swale, Ure, Nidd) which covers 1,300 square miles (3,300 km^{2}), (the Foss catchment is 77 square miles (200 km^{2}).

Low-lying land around the villages of Kelfield, Riccall, Wistow and Cawood, which are south of York, are designated as a floodplain, though it can cause damage to properties there. In February 2020, it was estimated that over 3,000 acres (1,200 ha) of fields were under floodwater, making the size comparable to that of Windermere, England's largest natural lake.

As the Ouse is tidal as far inland as Naburn, this means that flooding can occur due to heavy rainwater or tidal surges in the downstream settlements of Selby and Goole.

== Gallery ==
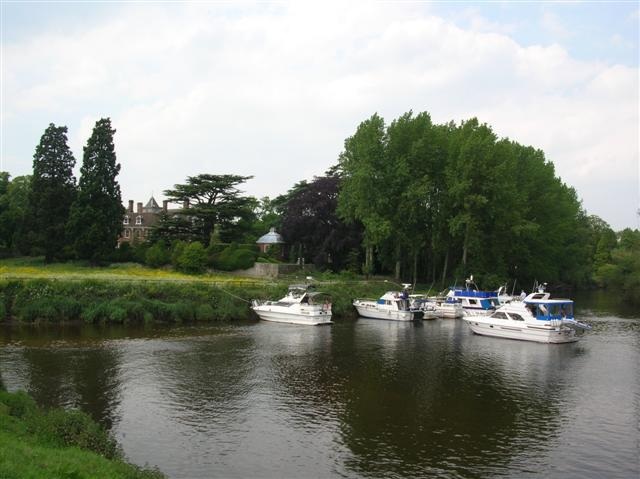
Nun Monkton, north west of York

The River Ouse in the city of York

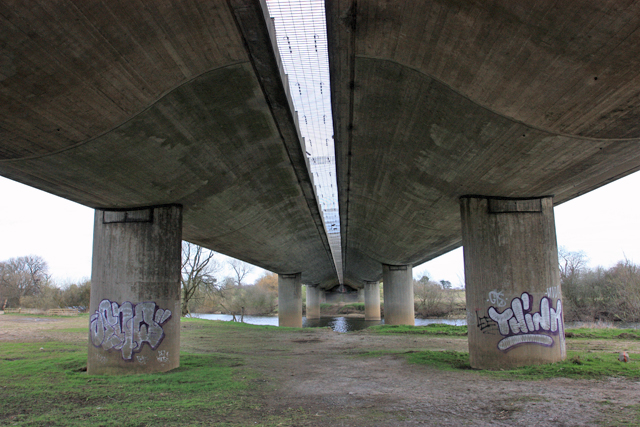
The A64 crossing the River Ouse, Bishopthorpe, York

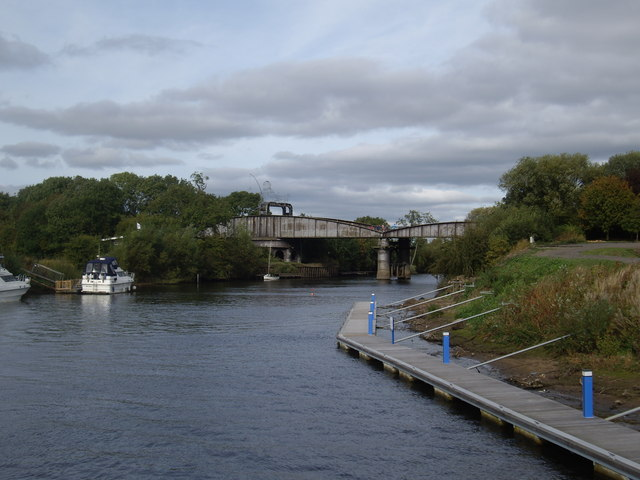
The Marina in Naburn, south of York

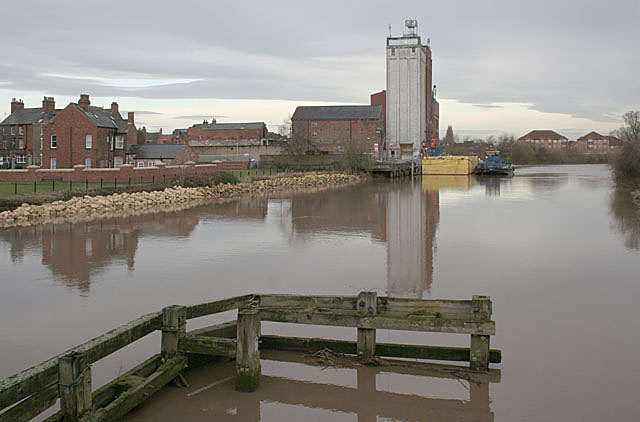
River Ouse at Selby

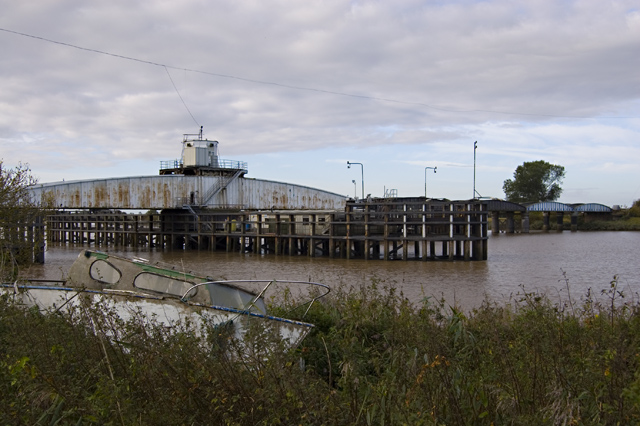
Goole swing rail bridge Goole

== See also ==
- Blacktoft Sands RSPB reserve
- Bridges of York
- List of crossings of the River Ouse, Yorkshire
- Rivers of the United Kingdom
- York City Rowing Club
