= Richard Harpin =

British entrepreneur, investor, and author (born 1964)

Sir Richard Harpin
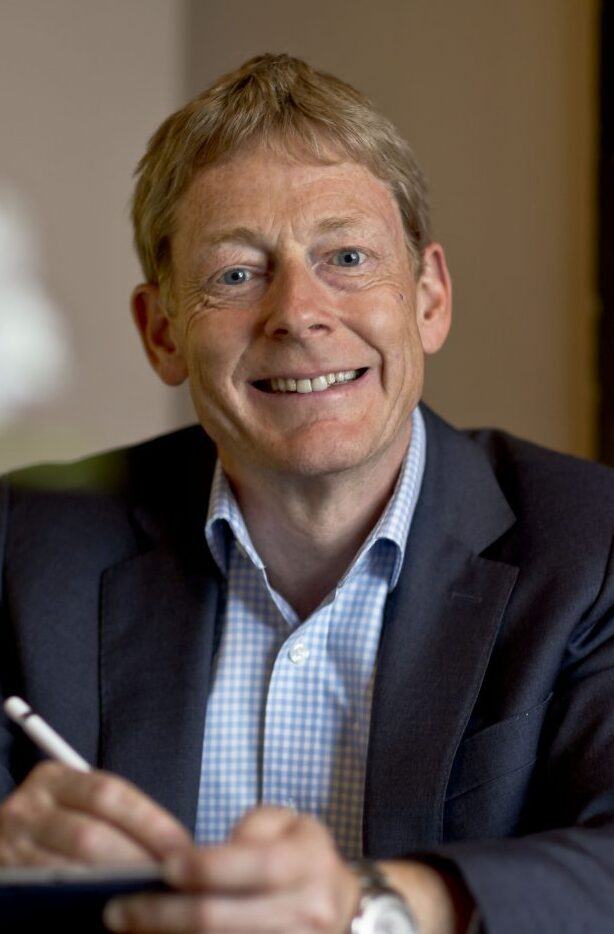
- Harpin in 2025
- Born: Richard David Harpin; 10 September 1964 (age 62); Huddersfield, West Riding of Yorkshire, England
- Education: University of York (BSc)
- Occupations: Entrepreneur, investor, and author
- Known for: Founder of HomeServe, Owner of Growth Partner and Business Leader
- Children: 3
- Website: richardharpin.com

Sir Richard David Harpin (born 10 September 1964) is a British entrepreneur, investor and author. He founded HomeServe in 1993 and served as its chief executive until 2023.

Harpin is also founder of the investment fund Growth Partner and owns Business Leader, a peer-to-peer community for entrepreneurs in the UK. In 2024, The Sunday Times Rich List estimated his family net worth at £670 million. In July 2025, he published How to Make a Billion in 9 Steps which debuted in its first week as a Sunday Times bestseller.

== Early life and education ==
Harpin was born in Huddersfield, West Yorkshire, and grew up in Northumberland. His father was a civil servant, and his mother was an occupational therapist. His paternal great-grandparents owned and operated a wool recycling mill.

Harpin attended the Royal Grammar School in Newcastle and later graduated from the University of York with a bachelor's degree in economics. As a student, he sold conkers to classmates and operated a mail-order business for fishing tackle and earrings. At York, he launched a student magazine, Connect.

== Career ==
Harpin joined Procter & Gamble in 1986 and served as a brand manager for Vortex bleach and Fairy liquid. He worked at Procter & Gamble until 1990 before joining Deloitte as a management consultant.

=== HomeServe ===
While managing a portfolio of rental properties for a colleague, Harpin established a letting agency. This experience led to the development of the business concept for HomeServe. In 1993, Harpin co-founded HomeServe as a joint venture with South Staffordshire Water, which provided an initial £500,000 in capital. The company offered subscription-based home emergency repair services. Under his tenure, Harpin expanded HomeServe into a multinational company operating in the UK, US, France, Spain, and Japan. In 2004, HomeServe demerged from South Staffs Water and was listed on the London Stock Exchange and later became part of the FTSE 100 Index. In 2017, HomeServe acquired the tradespeople directory Checkatrade.

In 2022, Harpin agreed to the sale of HomeServe to Brookfield Asset Management for £4.1 billion. The transaction was completed in early 2023. Harpin held a 7.4% stake and his wife, Kate, held a 4.8% stake which was valued at £490 million. Following the acquisition, Harpin became Chairman of HomeServe's operations in Europe, the Middle East, and Africa. In January 2025, Harpin stepped down as Chairman of HomeServe.

=== Growth Partner and Business Leader ===
In 2015, Harpin launched Growth Partner, a private investment fund focused on founder-led consumer businesses. He has committed over £150 million to the fund. The fund has invested in companies such as Passenger Clothing, Stubble & Co, Easy Bathrooms, Gozney, Secret Food Tours, Flooring Superstore, Acai, Wave, Host & Stay, and Additional Lengths.

In 2023, Harpin acquired Business Leader, a UK magazine and events platform. During his ownership, Business Leader has expanded its focus to peer-to-peer networks, coaching and insight to help entrepreneurs grow their businesses. He hosts weekly growth workshops for entrepreneurs at his London home.

In 2020, Harpin invested £5 million in Flooring Superstore, a UK flooring retailer, as part of his ongoing strategy of backing consumer focused businesses. In 2026, his investment faced restructuring as declining demand and rising costs threatened 300 jobs across 50 stores.

== Writing ==
Harpin has authored business columns for The Sunday Times, Mail, City A.M., and The Yorkshire Post. In 2025, Harpin published the book How to Make a Billion in Nine Steps, which became a Sunday Times bestseller.

== Philanthropy ==
In 2009, Harpin founded The Enterprise Trust, a charity that promotes youth entrepreneurship and apprenticeships. The trust funds enterprise programmes and works closely with Young Enterprise, The Careers and Enterprise Company, the Scouts, and The Duke of Edinburgh's Award. During the COVID-19 pandemic, the trust donated a £60,000 aid package to homelessness charities in the West Midlands.

== Personal life ==
Harpin was previously married to Kate Harpin, and they have three children. In 2013, Harpin bought their village pub, The Alice Hawthorn Inn in Nun Monkton, to prevent its closure. It won Yorkshire Life magazine's Dining Pub of the Year award in 2017. They also helped revive the Nun Monkton Ferryboat across the River Ouse in 2017 which had been closed since 1952.

Harpin is a lifelong Newcastle United fan. He was a political donor to the Conservative Party.

In December 2025, Harpin was awarded a knighthood in the 2026 New Year Honours.

== Awards and recognition ==
Harpin was named Ernst & Young UK Entrepreneur of the Year in 2008. In 2011, he served as chairman of the judging panel for the same award. He has been included on The Sunday Times Rich List, with an estimated family net worth of £670 million.
