= Nun Monkton Priory =

House in Nun Monkton, North Yorkshire, England

Coordinates: 54°00′53″N 1°13′14″W

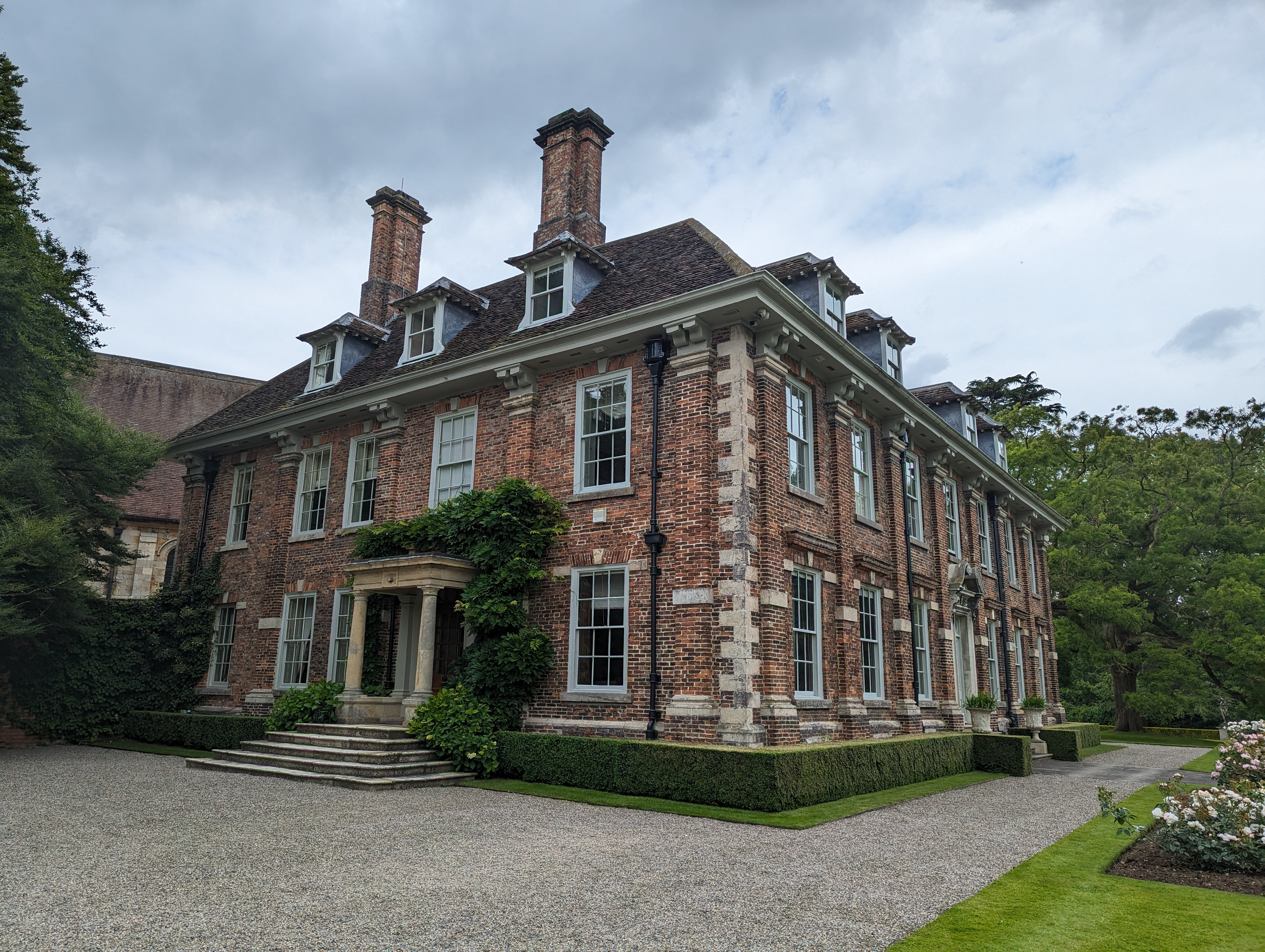
The house, in 2024

Nun Monkton Priory is a historic house in Nun Monkton, a village in North Yorkshire, in England.

== History ==
A Benedictine priory was founded on the site in the reign of Stephen, King of England, which was dissolved during the English Reformation. St Mary's Church, Nun Monkton is the only surviving part of the Mediaeval priory. The rest of the property was sold to John Neville, 3rd Baron Latimer, and then descended through the Percy family until it was acquired in about 1650 by George Payler. He had the property demolished and a new house built, in about 1660. Some of the mullioned windows were replaced by sash windows, probably in the 1710s. The house was little altered over the following centuries, although the porch was moved from the main front to the left front some time after 1773, and the door on the main front is probably 20th century. The house was restored in the 1920s by R. B. Armistead for its owner, C. W. Whitworth. It was Grade II* listed in 1952.

== Architecture ==
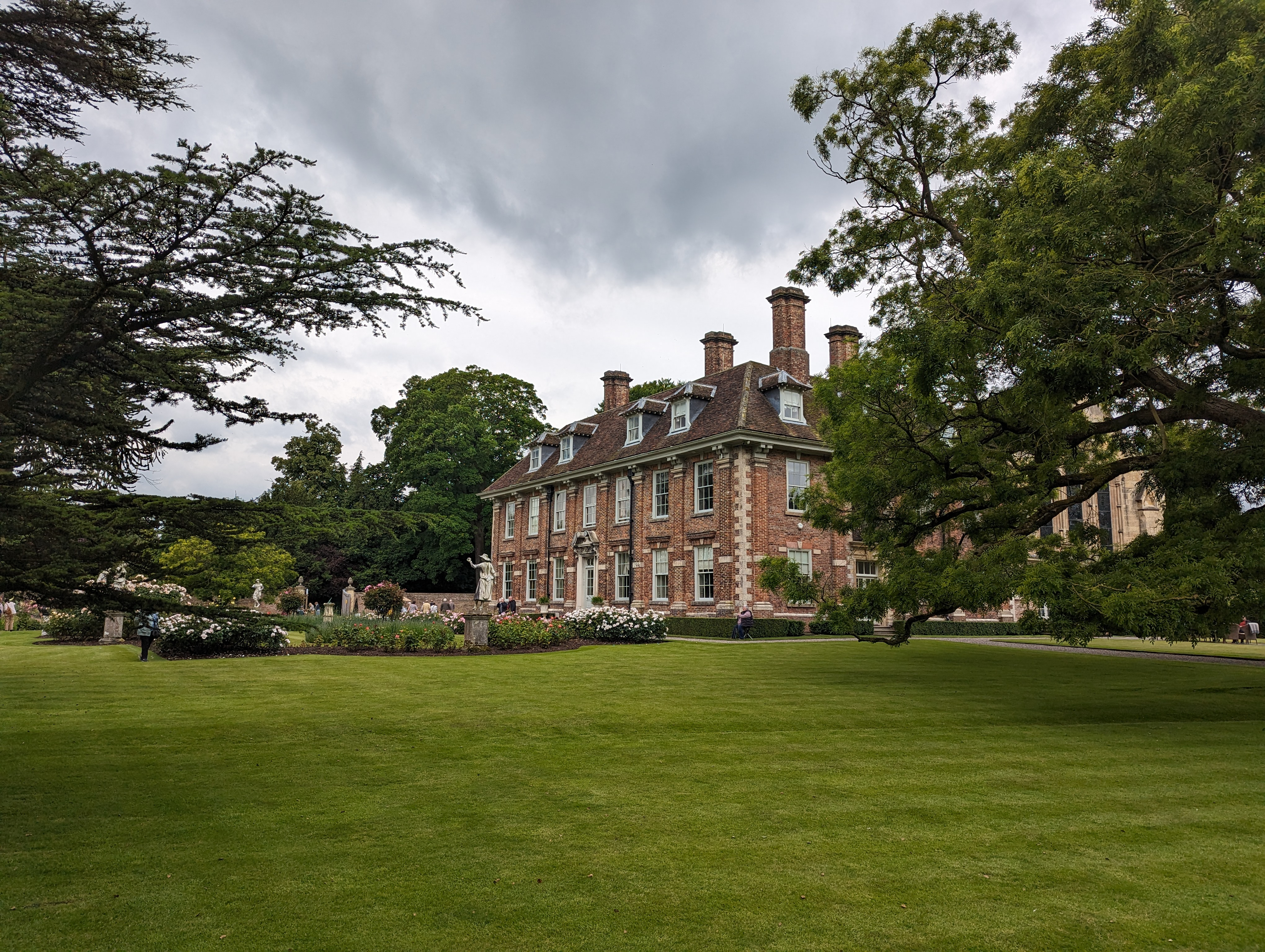
View from the southeast

The house is built of brick, with stone dressings, and a tiled roof. It has a U-shaped plan, with the main entrance under a Doric order porch on the west front. It is two storeys high, with attics and cellars, and is seven bays wide. The bays are divided by pilasters, supporting consoles, which carry the eaves. There is a central door on the south front, set in an architrave. The windows are replacement sashes. The drainpipe heads are mid-18th century.

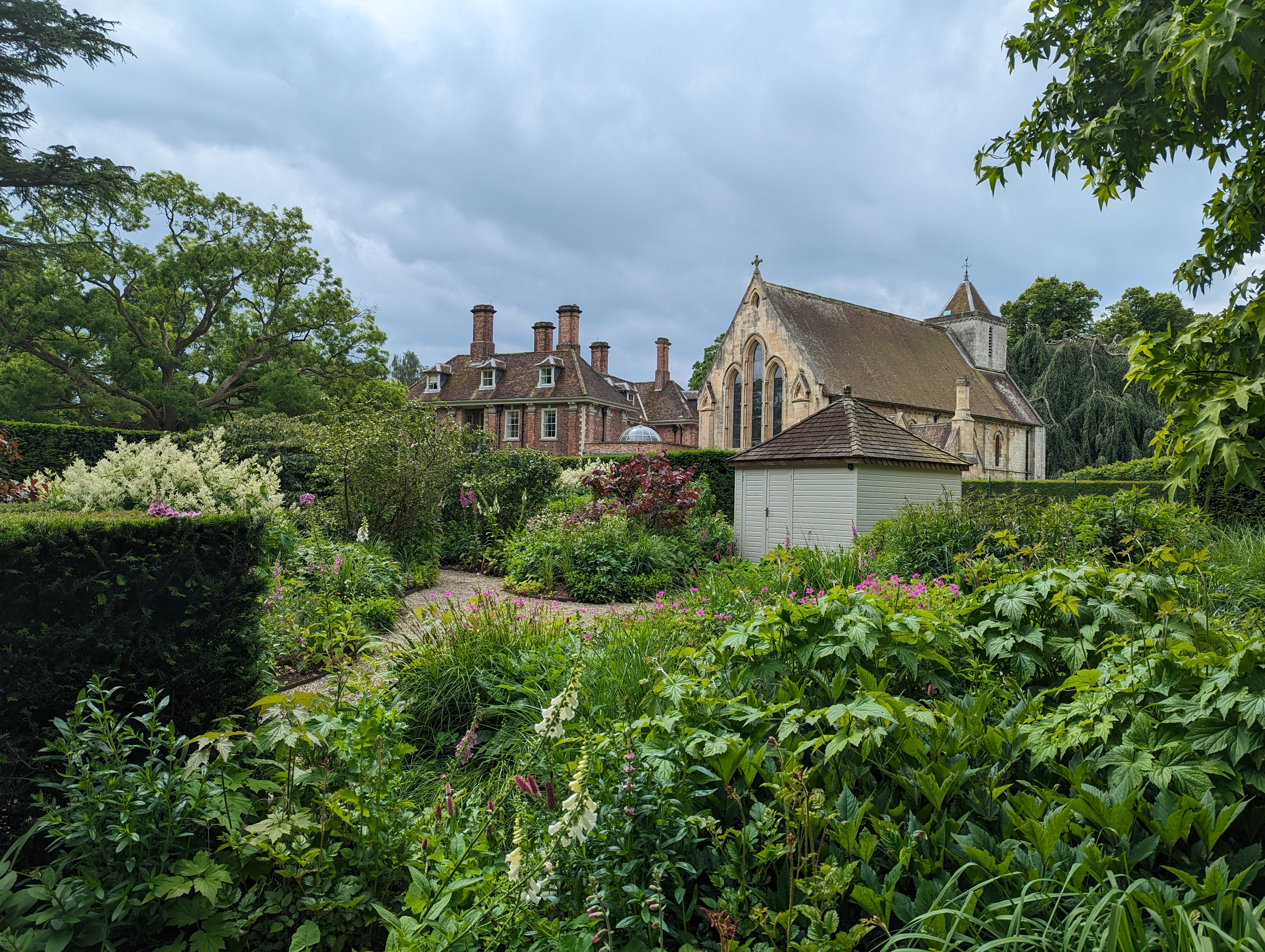
View from the northeast, showing St Mary's Church next door

Inside the house, the original staircase survives, the newels carrying carvings which may represent faith, hope and charity. The dining room has early-18th century panelling, with a carved frieze depicting overhanging acanthus leaves, which may be by the joiner William Thompson. The central reception room has a fireplace with a decorative surround, and the room above has a mid-18th century Rococo frieze. The doors are also early, and there are swags above them.

== Garden ==
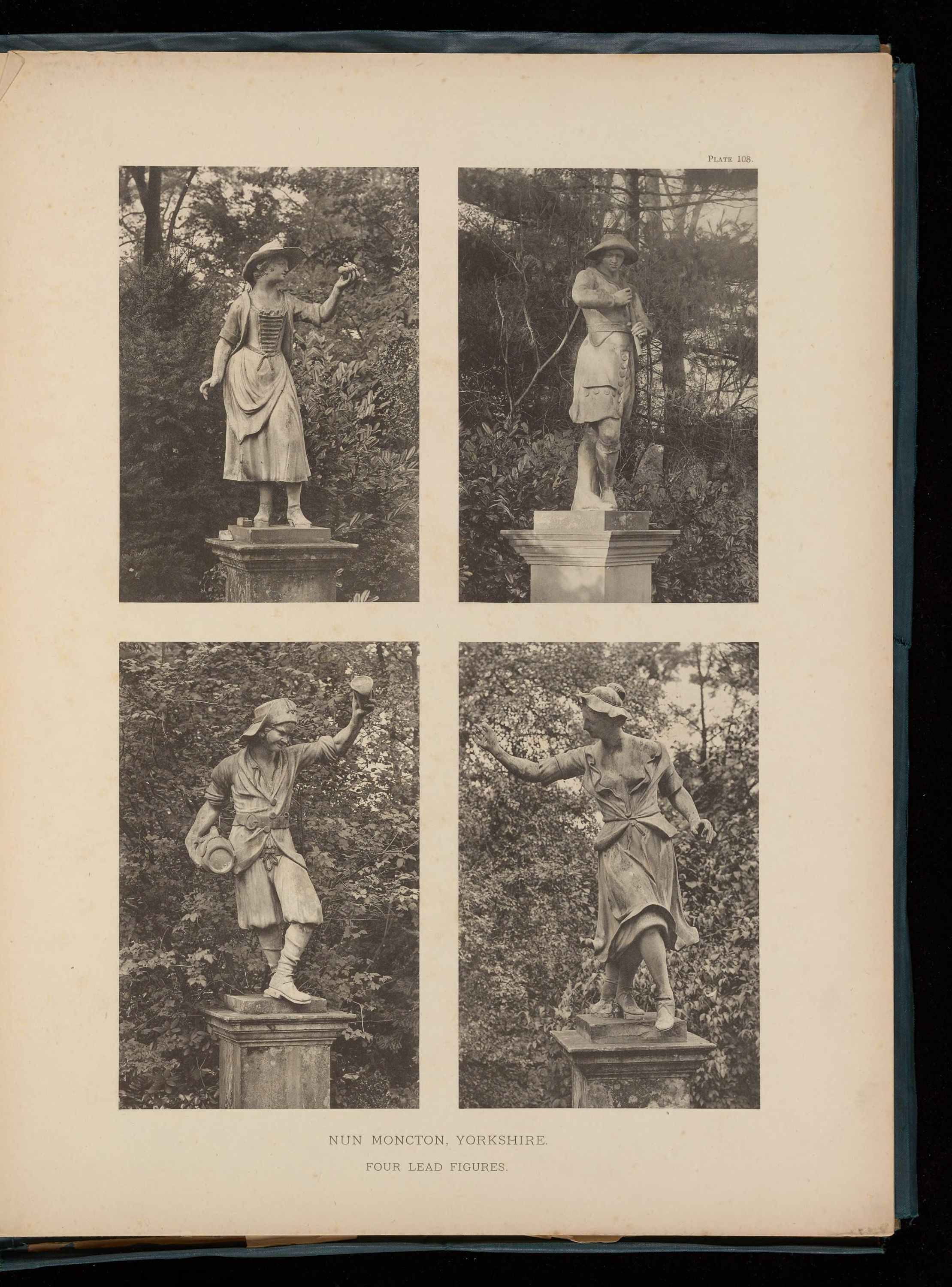
The statues of the girl with birds' nest, Minerva, the buccaneer, and the sailors' moll, seen in 1902

The house has a rose garden, a kitchen garden, lawns with long borders, and a yew walk, which leads to informal parkland. In the garden, there are an assortment of early-18th century statues, which might be by Andries Carpentière; these are each grade II* listed. Lawrence Weaver states that "nearly all the types of eighteenth-century garden sculpture are represented". The eight statues depict Fame, Mars, Minerva, a girl with a birds' nest, a sailors' moll, a shepherd, a buccaneer, and a haymaker. Each is cast from lead and sits on a stone pedestal, together between 2.5 and 3 metres high.

Also in the gardens is an unusual vernacular carved stone, possibly of the 19th century, topped by a 14th-century finial. In the corner of the garden is an early-18th century pavilion, built of brick, with an ogee-shaped lead roof.

== See also ==
- Grade II* listed buildings in North Yorkshire (district)
- Listed buildings in Nun Monkton
