= Alice Hawthorn =

British racemare (1838–1861)

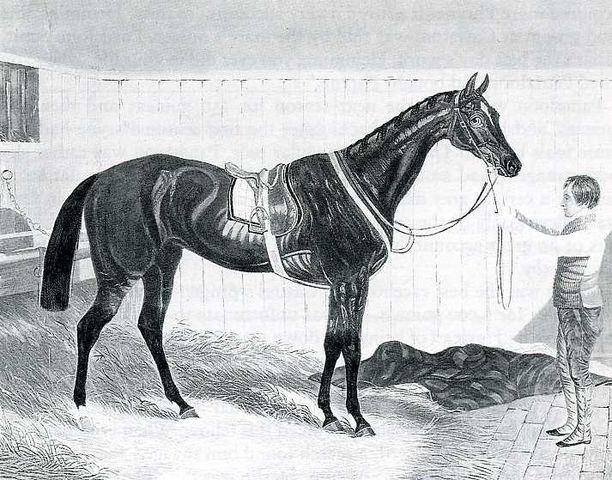
- Sire: Muley Moloch
- Grandsire: Muley
- Dam: Rebecca
- Damsire: Lottery
- Sex: Mare
- Foaled: 1838
- Died: 1861
- Country: United Kingdom of Great Britain and Ireland
- Colour: Bay
- Breeder: John Plummer
- Earnings: ₤7,894

Alice Hawthorn (1838–1861) was a British thoroughbred racehorse and broodmare. A bay filly, she was sired by Muley Moloch and out of Rebecca, by Lottery. She is considered one of the greatest British racemares of all time, and won over fifty races in more than seventy starts.

== Background ==
Alice Hawthorn was bred by John Plummer of Skipton. According to local folklore, the horse was named after a girl who helped with the foal's birth. Hawthorn was described as a "fine animal", but "singularly narrow" and an "awkward walker".

In 1841, Alice Hawthorn made her racing debut at York Racecourse for the October Meeting, with a fourth place finish in the All-aged Stakes. In 1842, she became known for a three day winning streak at Chester racecourse. First she won the Chester Cup, the following day she won a handicap stakes race, and then the Cheshire Stakes the next day. That year, she started nine times and won seven races.

She was later leased to John Salvin who continued her racing career. In 1843, she won eighteen races out of twenty six starts, including the Doncaster Cup and the Innkeeper's Plate. In the Doncaster, she beat Charles the Twelfth in his final race.

In 1844, Alice Hawthorn would win twenty races out of twenty four starts, including the Goodwood Cup. Her final racing year was 1845, where she started seven times and own three races. After her racing career was over, she became a broodmare. In 1857, she produced Thormanby, who would win the 1860 Derby.

== Legacy ==
"Alice Hawthorn" is the name of a Yorkshire folk ballad, as well The Alice Hawthorn pub in Nun Monkton.
