= Linton Lock Hydro =

Hydroelectric power station in North Yorkshire, England

Linton Lock
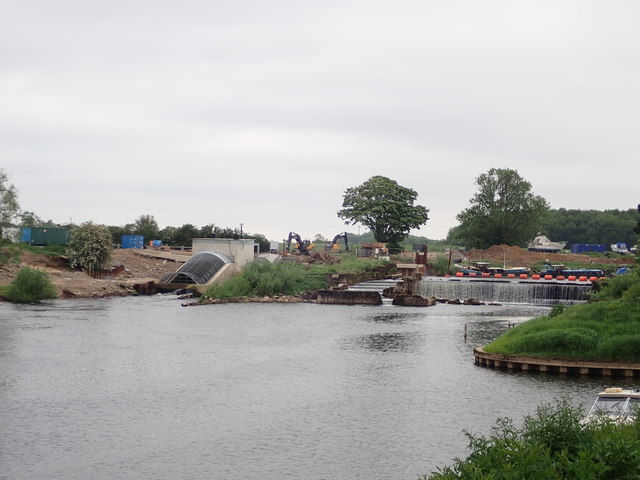
- The plant under construction
- Country: England
- Location: Linton-on-Ouse, North Yorkshire
- Coordinates: 54°02′01.4″N 1°14′17.8″W
- Status: Active
- Commission date: 1923 (first generation); 2011 (second generation); 2017 (third generation)
- Decommission date: 1961 (first generation)

Power generation
- Units operational: 2
- Units decommissioned: 1
- Annual net output: 380 kWh

Linton Lock Hydro is a hydroelectric plant on the River Ouse in North Yorkshire, England, between the villages of Linton-on-Ouse and Nun Monkton. The first hydroelectric scheme was built here in 1923, but that was abandoned in the early 1960s. The second scheme to be sited at Linton Lock was installed in 2011 and a new generating unit came on stream in 2017. The combined output from the second and third generation plants is 380 kW, which is enough to power 450 homes.

== History ==
Linton Lock was built in 1767 on the north bank of the River Ouse in North Yorkshire near to the village of Linton-on-Ouse. The river at Linton-on-Ouse was canalised by John Smeaton as part of a number of acts that were intended to make the Ouse (and further upstream, the Swale) navigable as far as Bedale. As part of the lock construction, a weir was built on the south bank of the Ouse to help control the flow of water into the lock. Both the lock and the weir are listed structures.

The first hydroelectric scheme at the lock was instituted by the York Corporation in response to the high price of coal after the First World War. The hydroelectric plant was opened in 1923 and visited in that same year by Princess Mary. This scheme was abandoned in 1962 as the National Grid came into effect with power being sourced from larger generating stations fed mostly by coal.

A second plant was Commissioned in 2012 after a protracted planning process that saw rival schemes being promoted on the north and south banks of the river, which meant that the plans were submitted to two different local authorities (Harrogate Borough Council for the south bank scheme and Hambleton Council for the other). As well as local opposition to the schemes (which was down to visual impact as opposed to the actual scheme itself), the British Canoe Union (BCU) objected to the proposals. They, like the local communities next to the river, were not in objection of green power, but the building of the scheme would seriously hamper what the BCU described as "the second best place in the country to practise our sport."

The 2012 scheme saw an Archimedes Screw installed with a length of 28 feet (8.5 m) and a diameter of 9.8 feet (3 m). The screw was installed in 2011 with a capacity to generate 101 kW.

A second scheme was proposed soon afterwards and gained approval in 2016 with construction starting in that same year. This scheme involves the world's largest Archimedes Screw used in hydroelectric generation and is situated immediately to the south of the 2012 screw. The second screw generates 1,250 MWh per year and in addition to the siting of the turbine, the company behind the venture, Linton Hydro, also reconditioned the fish ladder, built a new adjacent fish ladder and installed a new slalom canoe course via a new cut in the south bank. Canoe England invested £200,000 to match the same amount of money by the company to build the new canoe course. When complete the course will be open to all canoeists including a local club which competes at national level.

The operators of the 2017 scheme acquired 100% of the rights to the 2012 scheme, which means the combined output from the plant is 380 kW or enough to power 450 homes.

== Weir and salmon ladder ==
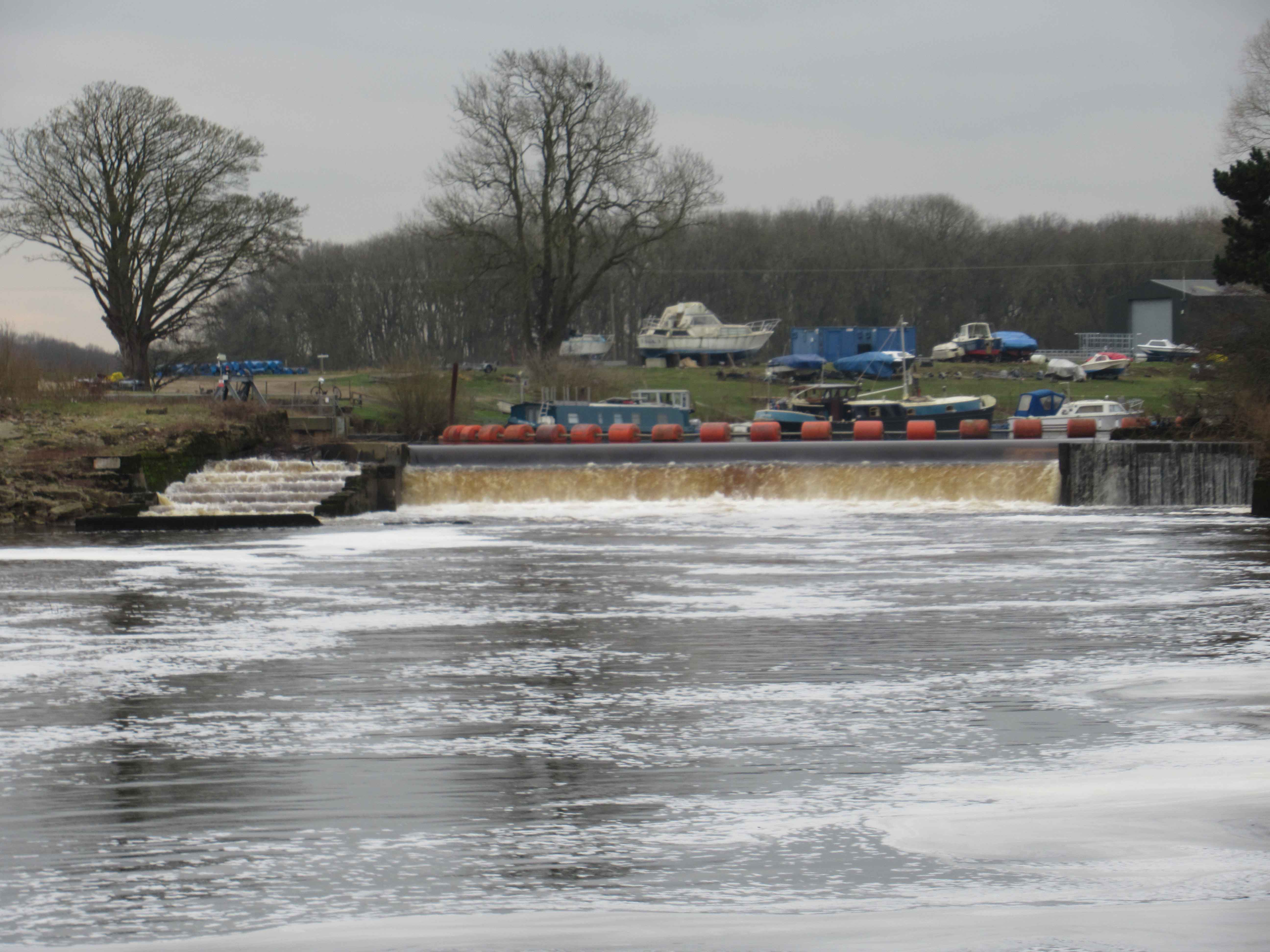
The weir and ladder, in 2023

The construction of the weir and salmon ladder was authorised by an Act of Parliament in 1767, and it was built shortly afterwards. They were grade II* listed in 1986. The weir has a 12-foot (3.7 m) drop and is built of limestone, partly rendered, and it stretches across most of the River Ouse. On the right is an overflow channel, and the salmon ladder is on the left. The ladder consists of a series of stepped basins with ramped walls. It was used for a couple of experimental canoe slaloms in the 1970s.

== See also ==
- Grade II* listed buildings in North Yorkshire (district)
- Listed buildings in Nun Monkton
