= Checkatrade (disambiguation) =

Checkatrade is a directory of vetted UK tradespeople.

Checkatrade may also refer to:

- Checkatrade.com Stadium, sponsored name of Broadfield Stadium, home of Crawley Town F.C.
- Checkatrade Trophy, formerly the sponsored name of the EFL Trophy
