= Listed buildings in Nun Monkton =

Nun Monkton is a civil parish in the county of North Yorkshire, England. It contains 27 listed buildings that are recorded in the National Heritage List for England. Of these, one is listed at Grade I, the highest of the three grades, ten are at Grade II*, the middle grade, and the others are at Grade II, the lowest grade. The parish contains the village of Nun Monkton and the surrounding area, and, apart from a weir and salmon ladder, all the listed buildings are in the village. The most important buildings in the parish are St Mary's Church and a house, The Priory, which are both listed. A high proportion of the other listed buildings are in the gardens and grounds of The Priory, including a collection of lead statues. The other listed buildings include houses and associated structures, and a cross stump.

== Key ==
Grade	Criteria
I	Buildings of exceptional interest, sometimes considered to be internationally important
II*	Particularly important buildings of more than special interest
II	Buildings of national importance and special interest

== Buildings ==
Name and location	Photograph	Date	Notes	Grade
St Mary's Church; 54.01485°N 1.22076°W		c. 1175	The church has been altered and extended during the centuries, including a restoration and rebuilding of the east end in 1873. The church is built in limestone with a tile roof, and consists of a nave and a chancel under one roof, a north vestry, and a west tower embraced by the nave. At the west end is a Norman portal of five orders on slim shafts, with foliate capitals and a hood mould. Above is a triangular gable with pellet decoration on miniature shafts with waterleaf capitals, enclosing a trefoiled niche. The doorway is flanked by pairs of round-headed niches. Over these are three stepped lancet windows and a narrow stair window, bell openings, a corbel table, and a pyramidal roof. On the south front are three round-headed doorways; the western two doorways are Norman.	I
Cross stump 54.01375°N 1.22779°W		Medieval	The cross stump is in limestone, and consists of an irregularly shaped cross base about 0.25 metres (9.8 in) in height and 0.5 metres (1 ft 8 in) in width, with a rectangular rebate in the centre for a cross shaft.	II
The Priory; 54.01465°N 1.22064°W		c. 1660	The house is in brick with stone dressings, quoins, overhanging eaves, and a hipped tile roof. There are two storeys, attics and cellars, and a U-shaped plan. The south front has seven bays divided by pilasters. In the centre is a doorway in an architrave, with a decorated frieze and a scrolled pediment. The windows are sashes in architraves, with keystones, those on the ground floor with moulded hoods. In the attics are hip roofed dormers. The left return contains a Doric porch.	II*
Mallards; 54.01447°N 1.22724°W		Late 17th century	The house is in rendered brick, with a floor band, a cogged eaves course, and a pantile roof with gable coping and shaped kneelers. There are two storeys, four bays, an outshut on the right, and a rear extension. On the front is a gabled porch and a doorway with a divided fanlight, and the windows are sashes.	II
Plum Tree Cottage; 54.01480°N 1.22796°W	—	Late 17th century	The house is in brick, and has a pantile roof with tumbling-in to the right gable. There is one storey and an attic, two bays, and a lower extension to the right. In the centre is a doorway with a sash window to the left, and a casement window to the right. In the right gable end is a casement window on the ground floor, and a horizontally-sliding sash above, both with segmental arches.	II
Priory Cottage; 54.01489°N 1.22138°W	—	Late 17th century	The house is in rusticated brick, with rendered brick bands, a moulded floor band, a moulded eaves band, a dentilled cornice, and a hipped pantile roof. There are two storeys and four bays. The doorway is in the third bay, and the ground floor windows are transomed; all these openings have rusticated flat brick arches. The upper floor contains casement windows.	II
Hatch End; 54.01310°N 1.22756°W	—	Late 17th to early 18th century	The house is in brick, with a floor band, a dentilled eaves course, sprocketed eaves, and a pantile roof with tumbled-in gable ends. There are two storeys and four bays. On the front is a doorway, and the windows are casements, those on the ground under basket arches.	II
Statue of a Sailor's Moll and pedestal 54.01453°N 1.22021°W		Early 18th century	The statue in the garden of The Priory is in lead on a stone pedestal, and is about 2.6 metres (8 ft 6 in) in height. The pedestal has a rectangular plan, and a moulded base and cornice. The statue depicts a figure of a dancing girl with a hank of rope by her feet.	II*
Statue of Fame and pedestal 54.01512°N 1.22014°W		Early 18th century	The statue in the garden of The Priory is in lead on a stone pedestal, and is about 3 metres (9.8 ft) in height. The pedestal has a rectangular plan, a moulded base, panelled sides and a cornice. The statue depicts a figure of a winged Fame with a pipe and an olive branch.	II*
Statue of Girl with Bird's Nest and pedestal 54.01460°N 1.22006°W		Early 18th century	The statue in the garden of The Priory is in lead on a stone pedestal, and is about 2.7 metres (8 ft 10 in) in height. The pedestal has a rectangular plan, and a moulded base and cornice. The statue depicts a figure of a girl in a bodiced dress holding a bird's nest.	II*
Statue of Mars and pedestal 54.01463°N 1.21947°W	—	Early 18th century	The statue in the garden of The Priory is in lead on a stone pedestal, and is about 2.5 metres (8 ft 2 in) in height. The pedestal has a rectangular plan, and a moulded base and cornice. The statue depicts a figure of Mars in Roman armour holding a spear in his left hand.	II*
Statue of Minerva and pedestal 54.01465°N 1.21951°W	—	Early 18th century	The statue in the garden of The Priory is in lead on a stone pedestal, and is about 2.5 metres (8 ft 2 in) in height. The pedestal has a rectangular plan, and a moulded base and cornice. The statue depicts a figure of Minerva in Roman armour holding a spear in her right hand.	II*
Statue of Shepherd with pipe and pedestal 54.01448°N 1.22070°W		Early 18th century	The statue in the garden of The Priory is in lead on a stone pedestal, and is about 2.7 metres (8 ft 10 in) in height. The pedestal has a rectangular plan, and a moulded base and cornice. The statue depicts a figure of a shepherd boy in 18th-century dress, with crossed legs, holding a pipe.	II*
Statue of The Buccaneer and pedestal 54.01445°N 1.22053°W		Early 18th century	The statue in the garden of The Priory is in lead on a stone pedestal, and is about 2.6 metres (8 ft 6 in) in height. The pedestal has a rectangular plan, and a moulded base and cornice. The statue depicts a figure of a pirate in 18th-century dress, carrying a barrel on his left hip and a glass in his right hand.	II*
Statue of the Haymaker and pedestal 54.01502°N 1.22045°W	—	Early 18th century	The statue in the garden of The Priory is in lead on a stone pedestal, and is about 2.75 metres (9 ft 0 in) in height. The pedestal has a rectangular plan, and a moulded base and cornice. The statue depicts a figure of a bearded haymaker carrying a scythe over his left shoulder.	II*
Summer Pavilion; 54.01469°N 1.21963°W		Early 18th century	The pavilion in the garden of The Priory is in brick, with raised quoins, a moulded cornice, and a ogee-shaped lead roof with an ogee-shaped dome and a weathervane. There is a single storey,a square plan and one bay. The middle section projects slightly under a pediment, and contains a doorway with a radial fanlight and a large stepped keystone. In the right return is a sash window with a brick surround.	II
Lane End House; 54.01581°N 1.23115°W	—	Early to mid-18th century	The house is in brick, with an eaves band, sprocketed eaves, and a pantile roof with tumbled-in gable ends. There are two storeys, three bays, and a rear extension. In the centre is a doorway, above it is a blind window, and the other windows are horizontally-sliding sashes, those on the ground floor under elliptical arches.	II
Water Tower; 54.01395°N 1.22027°W		Early to mid-18th century	The water tower is in brick on a plinth, with bands, and a plain parapet. There are two storeys, a square plan and one bays. Steps lead up to the doorway, some windows are sashes, others are blind, and all the openings have segmental arches.	II
Avenue Cottage; 54.01484°N 1.22177°W		Mid-18th century	The house is in brick, with a floor band, and a pantile roof with gable coping. There are two storeys and attics, and a double depth plan, with two gables and four bays facing the road. The doorway is in the second bay, and the windows are sashes. In the left gable is a slatted window.	II
Church House and wall 54.01340°N 1.22855°W		Mid-18th century	The house is in brick, with a floor band, and a pantile roof with brick kneelers, tumbling-in to the lower part of the raised gables, and coping above. There are two storeys and a cellar, three bays, and a cross-wing at the rear. The central doorway has a divided fanlight, the windows are sashes, and all the openings on the front have elliptical arches. The cellar has a casement window. The front garden is enclosed by a wall about 1 metre (3 ft 3 in) in height.	II
Sundial; 54.01454°N 1.22036°W		18th century	The sundial in the garden of The Priory is in limestone, and is about 1 metre (3 ft 3 in) in height. It has an octagonal base and stands on a square base. The column has a moulded base, a moulded central band, convex sides, and a bead and foliage frieze. It is surmounted by a plain bronze gnomon.	II
Weir and Salmon Ladder; 54.03370°N 1.23831°W		c. 1767	The weir is in limestone, partly rendered, and it stretches across most of the River Ouse. On the right is an overflow channel, and there is a salmon ladder on the left. The salmon ladder consists of a series of stepped basins with ramped walls.	II*
The Alice Hawthorn; 54.01366°N 1.22543°W		Late 18th century	The house, later a public house, is in brick, with a floor band, a cogged eaves band, and a pantile roof, raised on the left. There are two storeys and four bays. The entrance is in the right bay, and the windows are sashes.	II
West Side Farmhouse; 54.01396°N 1.22896°W	—	Late 18th century (probable)	The house is in brick, and has a pantile roof with raised gable ends. There are two storeys and three bays. The central doorway has a fanlight, above it is a blind window, to its left is a casement window, and the other windows are horizontally-sliding sashes.	II
White Swan House and railings 54.01448°N 1.22470°W	—	Late 18th century	The house is in brick, with a dentilled eaves course, and a pantile roof with stone gable coping and shaped kneelers. There are two storeys and three bays. The central doorway has a fluted architrave with paterae in the corners, and a fanlight. The windows are casements under elliptical arches. In front of the garden are cast iron railings with decorative heads.	II
Carving north-east of The Priory; 54.01486°N 1.22032°W		19th century	This consists of a truncated pyramid in limestone with a square plan, carved with buildings and rural scenes. It is surmounted by a crocketed finial dating from the 14th century, and is about 1.75 metres (5 ft 9 in) tall.	II
Gate piers and wall, The Priory, 54.01436°N 1.22092°W	—	19th century	The gate piers flanking the entrance to the drive are in limestone with a cruciform plan, and are about 4 metres (13 ft) in height. Each pier has a moulded base and cornice, and a pineapple finial. The walls enclose the garden on the north, south and west sides. They are in brick and gritstone, and are coped, they are about 3 metres (9.8 ft) in height, and include sections of medieval walling.	II
