= HomeServe =

British home repair and improvement business

- Industry: Support Services; Home emergencies and repairs
- Founded: 1993; 33 years ago in Walsall, England, UK
- Founder: Richard Harpin; South Staffordshire Water
- Headquarters: Walsall, England, UK
- Key people: Gabriele Montesi (Chair of the Board)
- Revenue: ▲£1,304.7 million (2021)
- Operating income: ▼£71.8 million (2021)
- Net income: ▼£31.8 million (2021)
- Parent: Brookfield Corporation (2023–present)
- Website: homeservegroup.com

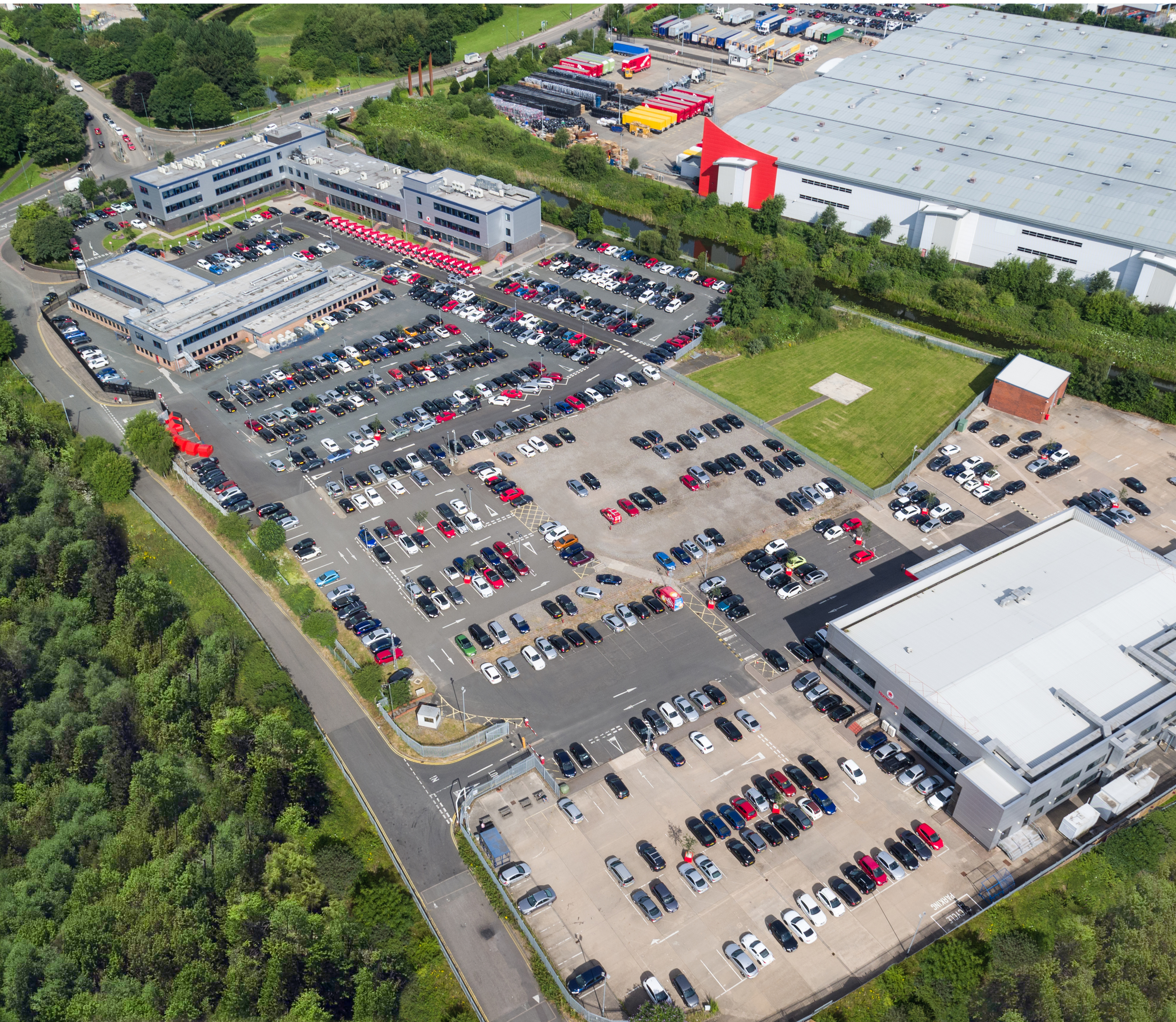
Aerial view of Headquarters in Walsall, England

HomeServe is a British multinational home emergency repairs and improvements business based in Walsall, England. It operates in the United Kingdom, France, Spain, Japan and Germany.

Established in 1993, HomeServe was listed on the London Stock Exchange until it was acquired by Brookfield Asset Management for £4.08 billion in January 2023.

== History ==
The company was originally established by Richard Harpin in 1993 as a joint venture between South Staffordshire Water and himself under the name of Fastfix to offer an emergency plumbing service.

In 1994, HomeServe diversified offering plumbing and drainage policies under the name "HomeServiceScheme". It launched Doméo, a joint venture in France in 2001, and Home Service in the United States in 2003.

After attempts to launch in Australia failed over objections made by the Australian Parliament, the water business was spun off from the rest of the group in 2004 and the company was changed to HomeServe PLC. Afterwards, it bought property repair company Reparalia in Spain in 2007, the French warranty provider SFG in 2009, and National Grid's service contract business in the United States in 2010.

Seven years after opening it in Italy, the company sold 51% of Assitenza Casa in March 2017 to Edison - the rest of the business was sold in July 2019. Inaugurated in 2012, its venture in Germany was sold three years later due to being unsuccessful.

In 2016, it was featured on a list of "the best places to work in the UK" for the first time when it was ranked third in a list published by Glassdoor. Two years later, UK recruitment website Indeed named HomeServe the fourth best private sector employer in the region, based on millions of employee ratings and reviews.

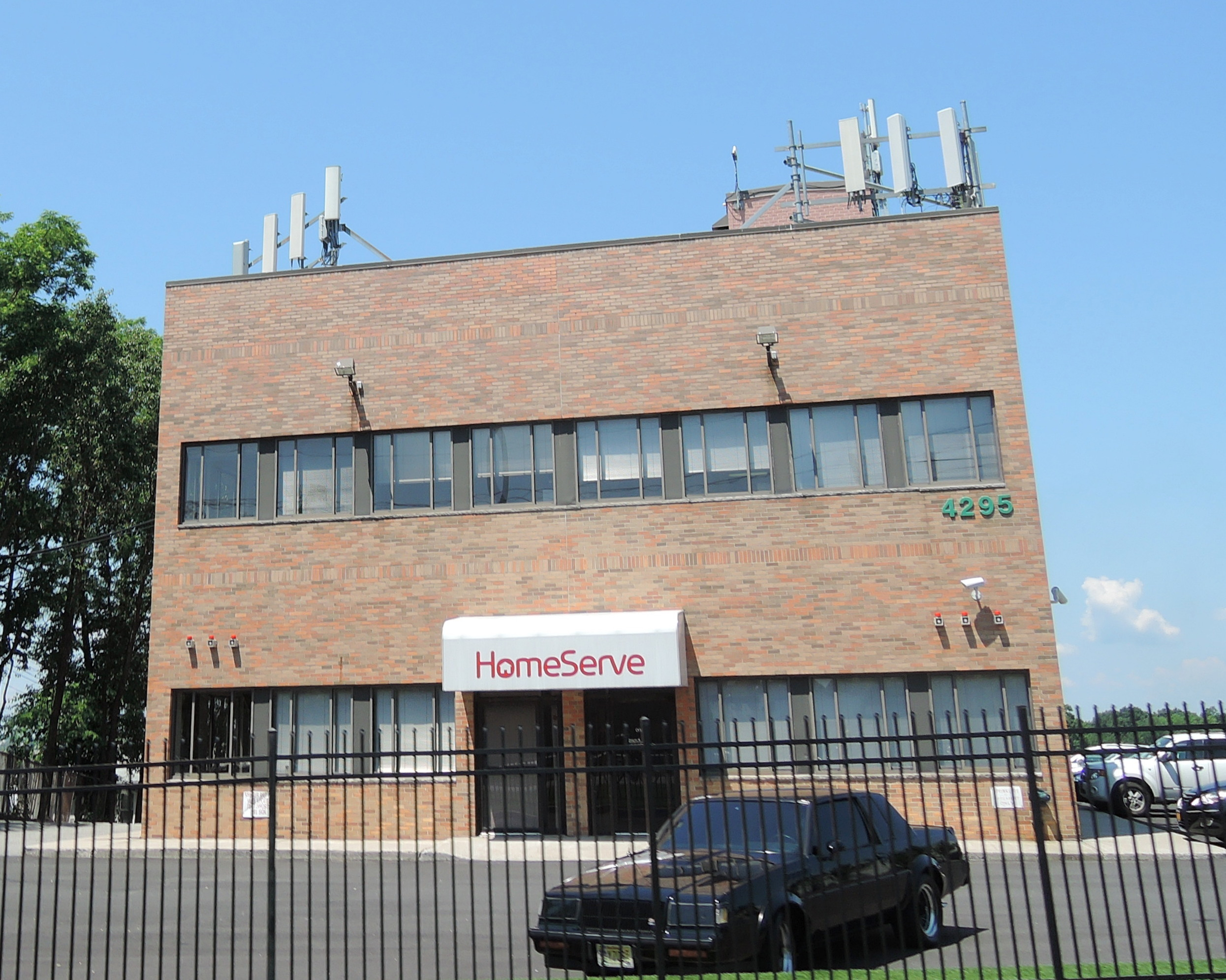
New York

HomeServe's US business, HomeServe USA, expanded during the 2010s. It operates across the continental United States and southern Canada. In 2013, the company moved its US headquarters from Stamford to Norwalk, Connecticut, as part of an expansion of its operations. Its growth was driven in part by partnerships with utilities, through which it offered repair plans to their customers. It also made a series of acquisitions, including Utility Service Partners in 2016, Dominion Products and Services in 2017, and in 2019 ServLine and a 79% stake in eLocal.

In 2017, it announced the acquisition of 40% of Checkatrade, an online directory of customer recommended tradespeople and took complete ownership later that year. Simultaneously, it took a 70% stake in Habitissimo, a Spanish web platform that connects homeowners to tradespeople and purchased the remaining 30% in 2019.

In 2019, as business profits in the United States surpassed those in the United Kingdom, HomeServe expanded into Japan by entering into a joint venture with the Mitsubishi Corporation.

During the 2020 COVID-19 pandemic lockdown, the company offered free emergency repairs to NHS and social care workers in the UK and introduced a telephone-based repair advice service in the US.

Four months after it was reported that Brookfield Asset Management was considering buying it, HomeServe agreed to recommend a £4.08 billion bid in July 2022. In December, it announced that all conditions for the takeover had been met, so allowing the transaction to proceed.

In January 2023, it was announced that its acquisition by Brookfield Asset Management has been completed. HomeServe plc was subsequently re-registered as a private company under the name HomeServe Limited. Brookfield subsequently separated HomeServe's North American and European operations and integrated them into its existing regional operations.

== Sports sponsorship ==
In 2010, HomeServe signed a one-year, £750,000 deal to be the official sponsor of then Premier League club West Bromwich Albion F.C. for the 2010/11 season. The club had previously sponsored a stand at West Bromwich Albion's neighbouring clubs, Walsall F.C. In 2014, HomeServe signed a three-year deal to sponsor the Main Stand at Walsall F.C.'s Bescot Stadium. Later in 2014, it was announced that HomeServe would be the official kit sponsor of Walsall F.C. in a three-year deal. In 2017, HomeServe signed a five-year deal with Walsall F.C.

== Criticism ==
During the period 2008 to 2011 the UK business breached the Financial Conduct Authority's Principles of Business, in particular mis-selling of policies to customers. As a result, HomeServe suspended all UK sales activity between October 2011 and January 2012 for retraining sales staff and was fined £30,647,400 by the FCA in 2014. Throughout this period, three private equity groups looked to acquire the company but were rejected by HomeServe's board.

In April 2012, Ofcom imposed a fine of £750,000 for making silent and abandoned calls to prospective customers in the period February to March 2011. It has since ceased the practice of cold-calling customers.
