= Widdington, North Yorkshire =

Former civil parish in North Yorkshire, England

Coordinates: 54.0289°N 1.2422°W

Widdington
- Township, civil parish
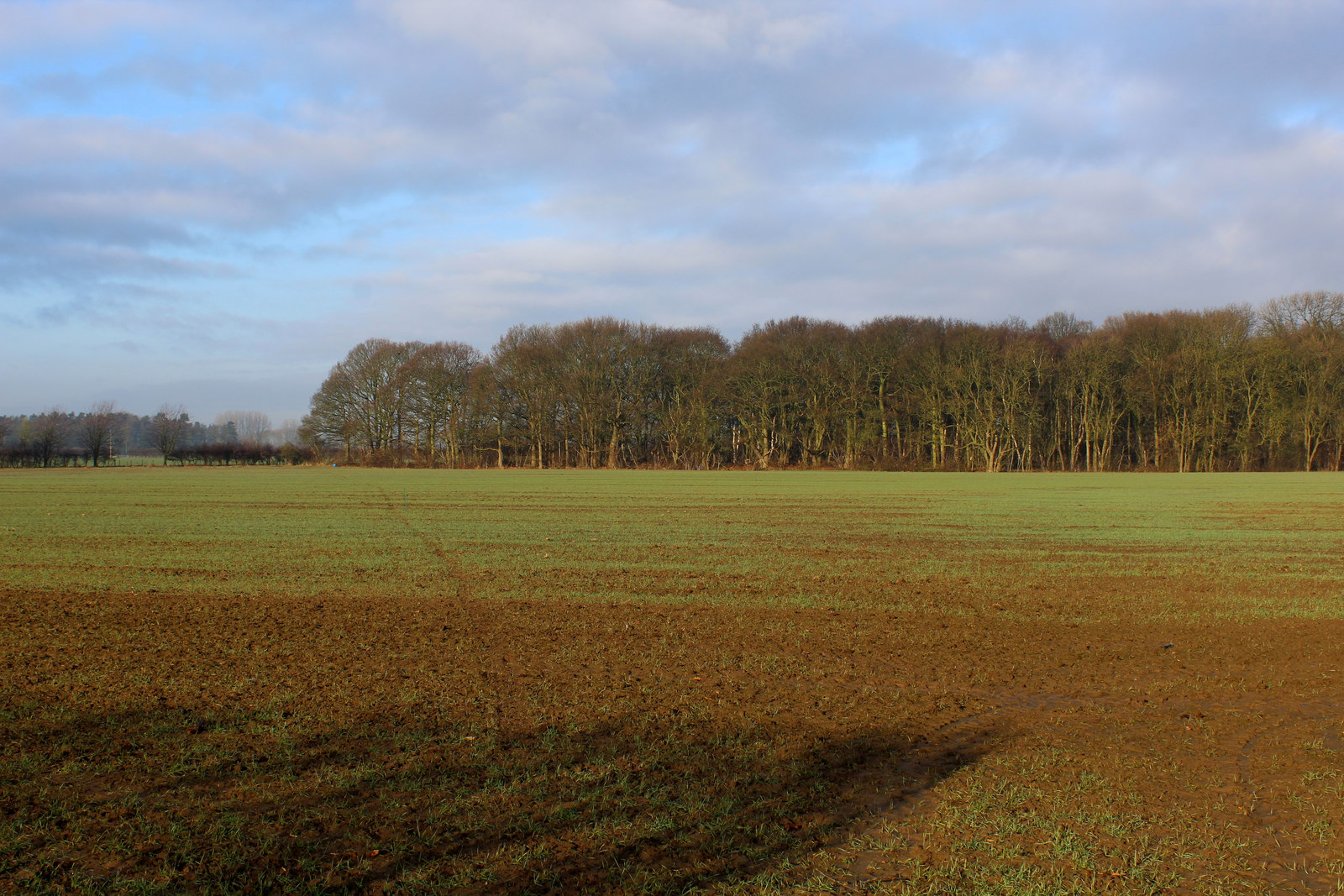
- Area
  - 1961: 701 acres (2.84 km^{2})
- Population
  - 1971: 14
- History
  - Abolished: 1 April 1988
  - Succeeded by: Nun Monkton
- Contained within
  - Non-metropolitan district: Harrogate

Widdington was a civil parish in the Harrogate district, in the county of North Yorkshire, England. It was about 8 miles from York. At the 1971 census (one of the last before the abolition of the parish), Widdington had a population of 14.

== History ==
The name "Widdington" means 'Willow-tree farm/settlement'. Widdington was recorded in the Domesday Book as Widetona/Widetone. Widdington was historically a township in the ancient parish of Little Ouseburn, in 1866, the legal definition of 'parish' was changed to be the areas used for administering the poor laws, and so Widdington became a civil parish. In 1894 Widdington became part of the Great Ouseburn Rural District of the West Riding of Yorkshire, in 1938 Widdington became part of Nidderdale Rural District, in 1974 Widdington became part of Harrogate non-metropolitan district in the non-metropolitan county of North Yorkshire, on 1 April 1988 the parish was abolished and merged with Nun Monkton. In 2023 the area became part of North Yorkshire district.
