= The Alice Hawthorn =

Pub in Nun Monkton, North Yorkshire, England

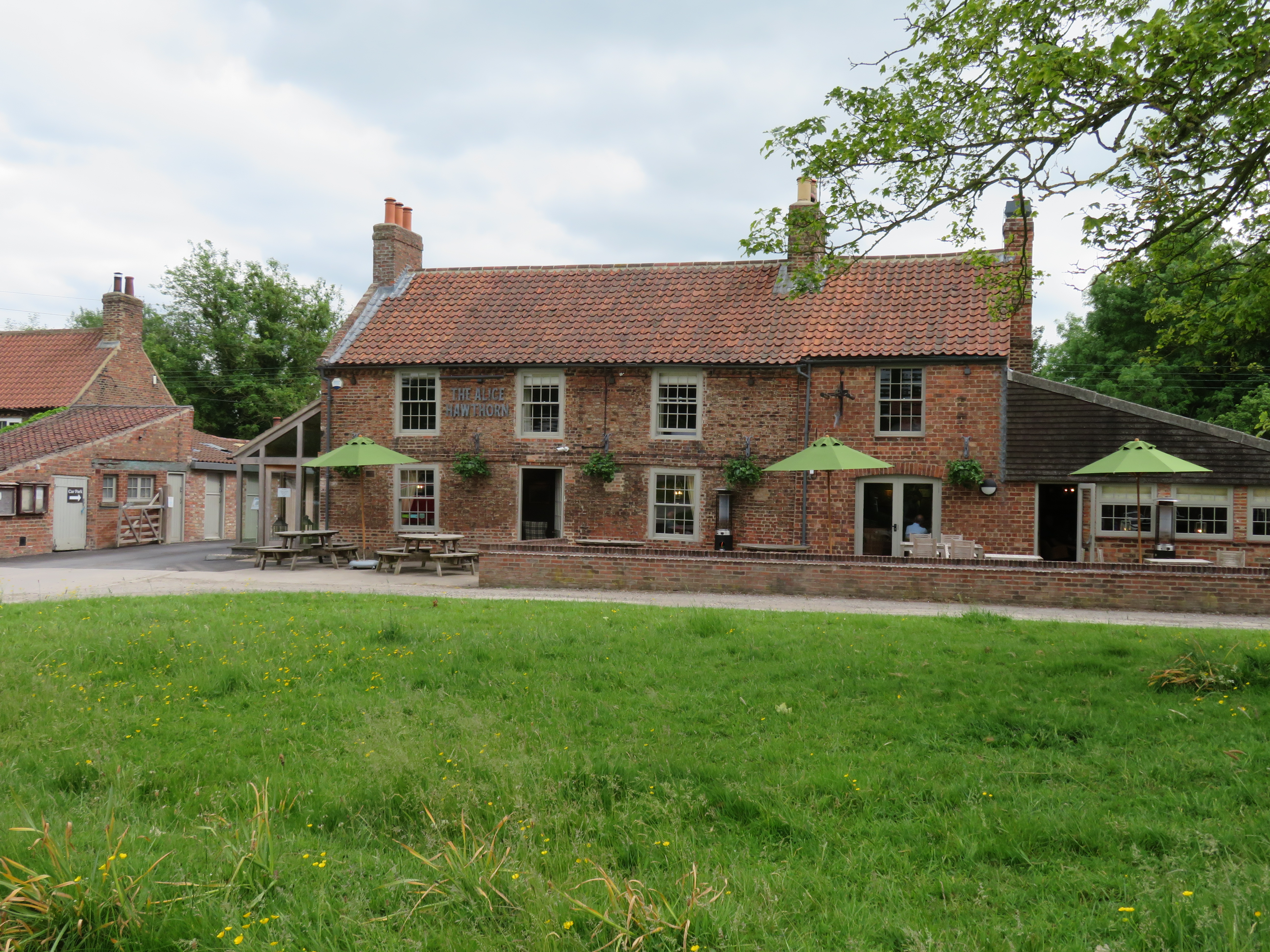
The pub, in 2021

The Alice Hawthorn is a historic pub in Nun Monkton, a village in North Yorkshire, in England.

The building was constructed in the late 18th century as a house, but in 1781 was first recorded as pub, named "The Bluebell". In the mid 19th century, it was renamed after the racehorse Alice Hawthorn. The building was extended to the left, right and rear in the 20th century, with the main entrance moved from the centre to the left extension. The building was grade II listed in 1987. The pub has closed and reopened several times, but is now the last of four pubs which once served Nun Monkton. In 2022, it was renovated by De Matos Ryan to provide a bar, restaurant, and four bedrooms, with a further eight bedrooms in outbuildings. In 2025, it was recognised by the Michelin Guide as one of the ten best pubs in Yorkshire.

The pub is built of brick, with a floor band, a cogged eaves band, and a pantile roof, raised on the left. There are two storeys and four bays. The entrance is in the right bay, and the windows are sashes. Inside, it has flagstone floors and visible beams.

== See also ==
- Listed buildings in Nun Monkton
