= St Mary's Church, Nun Monkton =

Church in Nun Monkton, North Yorkshire, England

Coordinates: 54°00′53″N 1°13′15″W

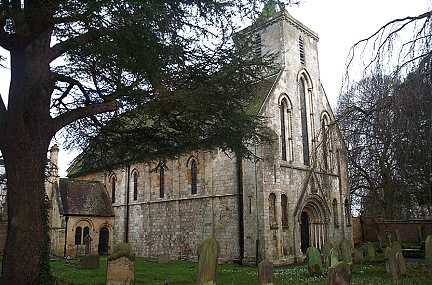
The church, in 2002

St Mary's Church is the parish church of Nun Monkton, in North Yorkshire, in England.

== History ==
Nun Monkton Priory was founded in 1172 by Ivetta of the Arches. The church was constructed soon after this date. The priory was dissolved in 1536, and the other buildings have since disappeared, but the nave and chancel of the church survived. In 1873, the east end of the church was rebuilt, on the initiative of Isaac Crawhall, who was influenced by the Oxford Movement. The new work was designed by John Wilson Walton. The church was Grade I listed in 1966.

== Construction ==
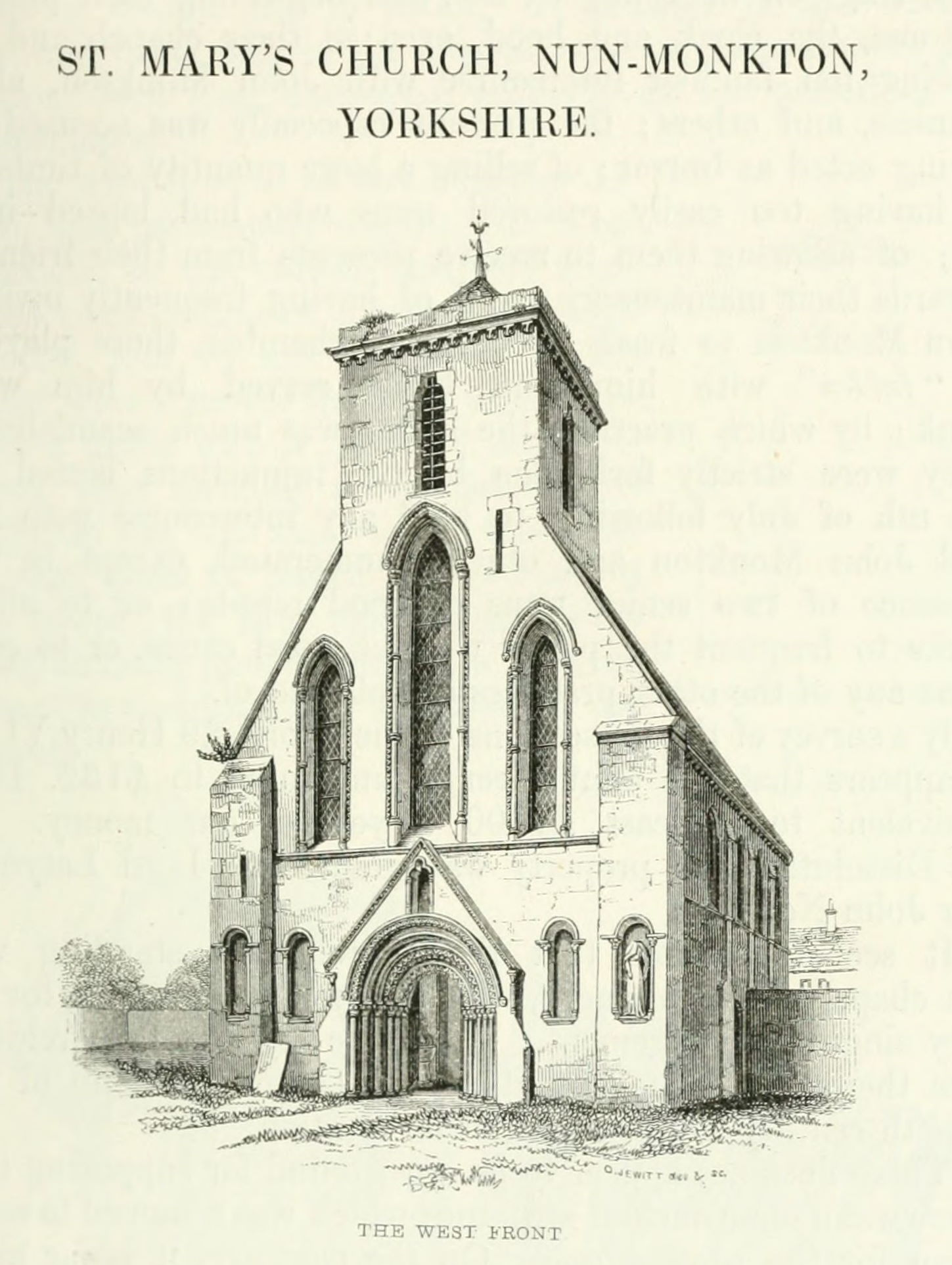
The church, in 1847

The church is built of limestone, and has a seven-bay combined nave and chancel. To the north of the eastern two bays is a vestry, which was added in 1873. The church's west end has a large round-headed doorway, with zigzag moulding and surrounded by niches, one of which contains a weathered statue of the Virgin Mary. There are three lancet windows above, and there is a tower topping the front. The south front has two doorways, one now blocked, and the second largely reconstructed in the 19th century. Inside, there are alternating narrow and broad bays, above which there is what Historic England describes as "an extremely fine triforium arcade".

=== Stained glass and fittings ===
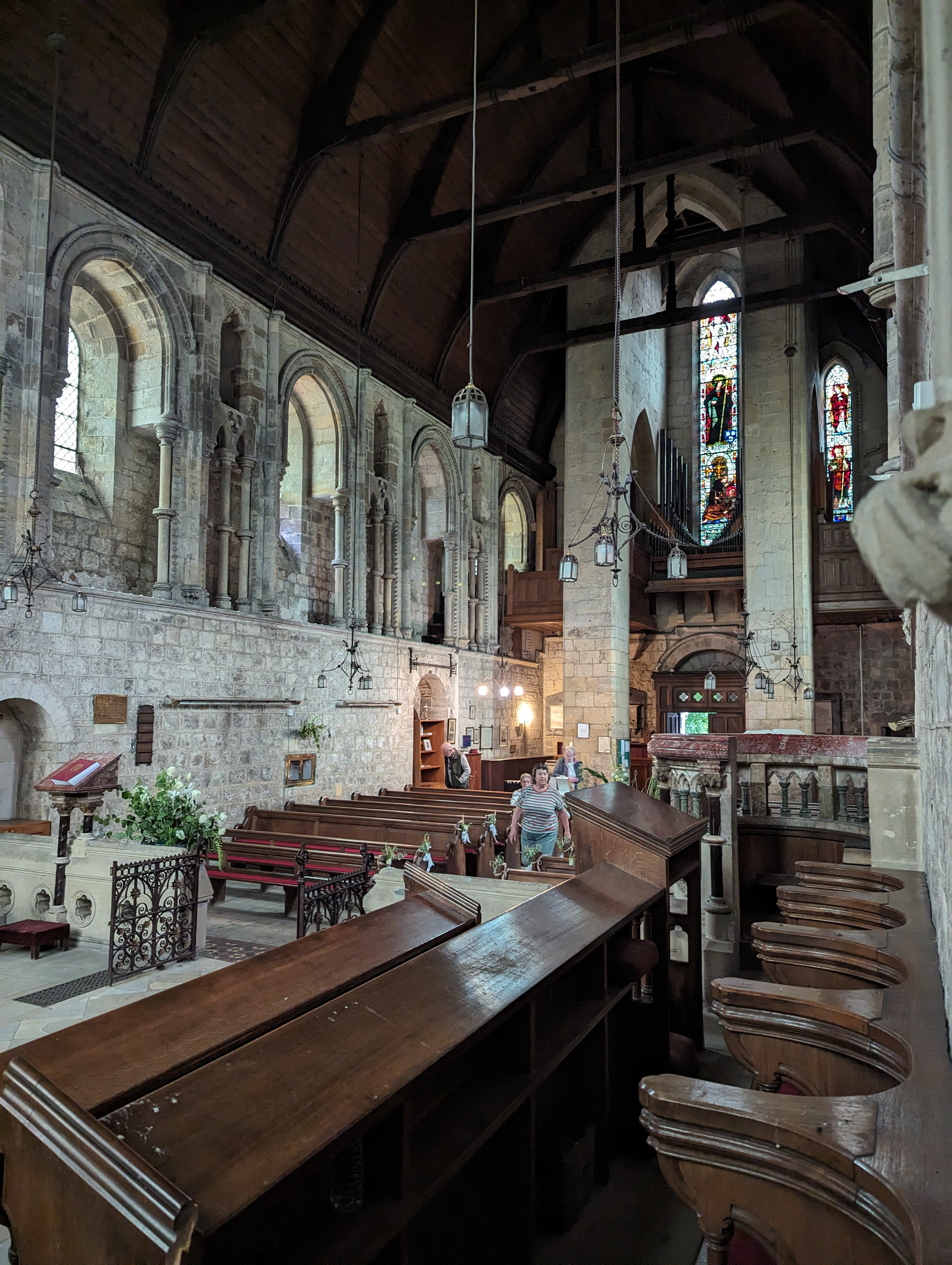
View from the chancel into the nave, in 2024

The stained glass in the church was designed by Morris and Co. and was added in 1873. The east window is believed to be to a design by Edward Burne-Jones, and the ensemble has been described by Nikolaus Pevsner as "the finest stained glass in the West Riding". There are several 17th and 18th century brass memorials, and a grand pulpit by sculptor Robert Beall, dating from 1873. (Note: In their listing, Historic England has written in error, "font" instead of "pulpit". The pulpit, which can be seen in the picture, was carved in coloured marble in 1873, but the font is hundreds of years old, in undecorated stone.)

== Churchyard ==
A local tradition states that some victims of the Battle of Marston Moor are buried in the churchyard. Until the early 19th century, there was an annual ceremony in which a statue of Saint Peter was dug up, paraded, and then reburied.

== See also ==
- Grade I listed buildings in North Yorkshire (district)
- Listed buildings in Nun Monkton
