= Checkatrade =

British online trade directory

Vetted Limited
- Trade name: Checkatrade
- Type: Limited company (subsidiary of HomeServe)
- Founded: September 1998; 28 years ago in Selsey, West Sussex
- Founder: Kevin Byrne OBE BCAb
- Headquarters: CityPoint, Moorgate, London, UK
- Area served: United Kingdom
- Key people: Jambu Palaniappan (CEO) Richard Harpin (Chairman)
- Revenue: ▲£131.5 million (2025)
- Number of employees: 447 (2025)
- Website: checkatrade.com

Vetted Limited, trading as Checkatrade, is a site which connects homeowners with approved local tradespeople. It is a subsidiary of Brookfield Corporation.

Checkatrade was founded by Kevin Byrne OBE (BCAb) and headquartered in Selsey, West Sussex, for 21 years. Byrne exited the business in 2018. Checkatrade then relocated to Portsmouth, Hampshire, in 2019 following its acquisition by HomeServe. Canadian asset management firm Brookfield acquired the company upon completing its purchase of HomeServe, Checkatrade’s parent organisation, in 2022.

Jambu Palaniappan became CEO in September 2023. The company is now headquartered in Moorgate, London.

In 2026, the company had more than 50,000 members.

== History ==
Originally known as Scout, Checkatrade was set up in September 1998 by local resident Kevin Byrne OBE BCAb after rogue traders descended on the seaside town of Selsey following a localised tornado that damaged 1,000 buildings and caused £10m in damage. Under the Scout name, Byrne printed and distributed a directory of local tradespeople whom he had personally checked to complete jobs in the Selsey area.

Scout soon expanded to cover Chichester. In the early 2000s, the company began advertising its services on local radio and television. It also began sponsoring major sporting events as ‘Scouted Out’ around this time.

In 2001, a website was published called The Trade Register. This name replaced Scouted Out, reflecting the company’s growing membership across Chichester, Surrey, and South West London. In 2005, the company changed its name to Checkatrade after a government rule forbade use of the word register. Checkatrade has been listed with Companies House as Vetted Ltd since 2001.

In 2013, Checkatrade had 100 employees, 10,000 members, and 80 directories live. By 2015, the company reached 19,000 members and two million published reviews.

In February 2017, HomeServe acquired a 40% stake in Checkatrade, but held an option to increase its share to 75% within the next two years. By November 2017, HomeServe had bought the remaining 60% of the business for £54m. Shortly afterwards, Byrne exited the business and was replaced by CEO Mike Fairman. In 2018, Checkatrade announced it was relocating to its current headquarters to Portsmouth.

In 2021, Checkatrade announced a new guarantee, covering homeowners up to £1,000 for any unsatisfactory work booked through the business. The same year, Checkatrade also launched an advertising campaign featuring a modern-day Julius Caesar. The advert was a satirical take on friends’ recommendations, referencing Caesar’s betrayal at the hands of those he trusted most. In the advert, Caesar rejects Brutus’s advice in favour of Checkatrade because the company offers "recommendations you can rely on".

In 2022, Brookfield acquired HomeServe, Checkatrade’s parent organisation, in a deal worth over £4bn.

In 2024, the company released the Checkatrade app for Apple and Android devices, which allows consumers to contact and book tradespeople via the app.

In 2025, Checkatrade launched a new advertising campaign with the slogan “A Job Done Right”, including new TV adverts and branding. The same year, it also launched TradeMore, a job management platform for tradespeople.

In 2026, it launched Checkatrade Express, a service which allows customers to hire tradespeople quickly for small tasks, and Checkatrade Shop, a retail website selling home improvement products.

As of 2026, Checkatrade is now headquartered in Moorgate, London. The business has 447 employees, over 53,000 trade businesses signed up as members, and over six million published reviews.

== Awards ==
In 2014, Checkatrade won a Queen’s Award for Enterprise in the Innovation category. Later that year, the company was recognised by The Times in its ‘Best Small Companies to Work For’ awards. Checkatrade won Online Trade Directory of the Year at the 2018 On the Tools awards.

Checkatrade has also won a number of Great Place To Work awards:

- #100 Best Workplaces™ 2024 (Large)
- #72 Best Workplaces for Women™ 2023 (Large)
- #59 Best Workplaces for Wellbeing™ 2023 (Large)
- #62 Best Workplaces™ 2023 (Large)
- # Best Workplaces in Tech™ 2023 (Large & Super Large)
- #53 Best Workplaces™ 2022 (Large)
- #51 Best Workplaces for Wellbeing™ 2022 (Large)
- #21 Best Workplaces in Tech™ 2022 (Large)
- #29 Best Workplaces for Women™ 2021 (Large)
- #30 Best Workplaces™ 2021 (Large)

In 2024, the company launched its own Checkatrade Awards, which recognise the achievements and skills of tradespeople on the platform. Categories include Tradesperson of the Year, Rising Star, Community Hero, and individual awards for a range of trades, such as Plumber of the Year.

== Industry outreach ==
Several local councils in the UK have previously partnered with Checkatrade to support trading standards, including Surrey, Nottinghamshire, East Sussex, Suffolk, Kent, and Buckinghamshire.

In 2019, Kent Police recommended that local residents hire tradespeople through the Kent County Council approved trader scheme created with Checkatrade after an elderly woman was targeted by con men, resulting in her losing over £1,000. Kent County Council ended their partnership with Checkatrade in 2020, replacing it with a Trading Standards vetting scheme.

In July 2021, Richard Harpin discussed research from Checkatrade on the BBC Radio 4 Today programme, noting the UK’s lack of skilled trade workers despite growing demand in the home improvement market.

Checkatrade has conducted research into the impact of rogue trading across the UK. In December 2021, the company found that 13% of its respondents had been impacted by rogue traders. In May 2022, the company found that residents in Newcastle, Belfast, and London were most likely to fall victim to rogue trading.

In October 2022, Checkatrade joined BT’s partnership network to help drive small business growth. Later on the same year, Checkatrade and HomeServe established ‘Trade-Up’, a not-for-profit campaign that trains people to become tradespeople.

In March 2023, Checkatrade published a report on the skills gap in UK trades and construction. It revealed a shortfall of one million workers. In response, the company launched GetIn, a nationwide campaign to encourage school leaders and young people under the age of 25 into trades careers via apprenticeships.

In April 2025, Checkatrade was a stakeholder in changes to the UK government’s Warm Homes Plan, with CEO Jambu Palaniappan expressing support for the promotion of green energy initiatives.

In July 2026, at its inaugural Skills Summit, Checkatrade announced plans to partner with technical colleges to encourage more young people into trade careers. The Summit and announcement followed the publication of Checkatrade’s Backing Britain’s Tradespeople report, in which the company conducted research into shifting attitudes towards careers in the trades.

== Sponsorships ==
Checkatrade were the primary sponsor of the English Football League Trophy, from the 2016/17 season to the 2018/19 season. The Checkatrade Trophy involves clubs from League One and League Two, plus 16 under-21 teams from the Premier League and EFL Championship clubs.

Between 2013 and 2018 the Broadfield Stadium, home of Crawley Town F.C., was renamed The Checkatrade.com Stadium as part of a sponsorship deal. In 2018, Checkatrade became sponsor of the PDC darts tournaments.

In February 2026 Checkatrade announced a partnership with British rugby league team Leeds Rhinos, 'built on shared values of hard work, pride and resilience, and a joint ambition to support skills, opportunity and economic growth across the North.'
