= Nun Monkton =

Village and civil parish in North Yorkshire, England

Coordinates: 54°00′50″N 1°13′40″W

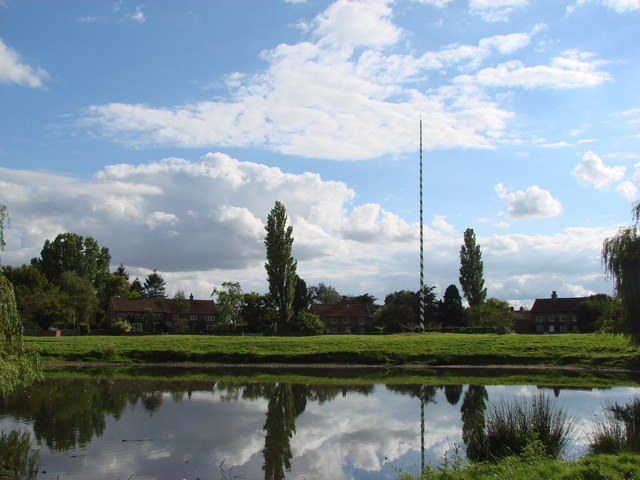
- The duckpond and maypole on the village green, Nun Monkton

- Location within North Yorkshire
- Population: 173 (2011 census)
- OS grid reference: SE509578
- Civil parish: Nun Monkton
- Unitary authority: North Yorkshire
- Ceremonial county: North Yorkshire
- Region: Yorkshire and the Humber
- Country: England
- Sovereign state: United Kingdom
- Post town: YORK
- Postcode district: YO26
- Police: North Yorkshire
- Fire: North Yorkshire
- Ambulance: Yorkshire

Nun Monkton is a village and civil parish in the county of North Yorkshire, England. It is situated 8 miles (13 km) northwest of York at the confluence of the rivers Ouse and Nidd. Cottages and houses are grouped around a village green of 20 acres (81,000 m^{2}) with a duck pond and a maypole. The Ouse is navigable for another 19 miles (30 km) and river traffic played an important part in the village's life until the middle of the twentieth century.

Until 1974 it was part of the West Riding of Yorkshire. From 1974 to 2023 it was part of the Borough of Harrogate, it is now administered by the unitary North Yorkshire Council. On 1 April 1988 the parish of Widdington was abolished and merged with Nun Monkton.

== History ==
Some sort of settlement has probably existed since the earliest times. The name "Monkton" appears to reflect a pre-Viking or Anglian settlement in the 8th and 9th centuries. The village is mentioned in the late 11th-century Domesday Book where it is referred to – like most villages in northern Yorkshire – as vastatus i.e. deliberately wrecked by the invading Normans to prevent uprisings against them.

=== Medieval Benedictine nunnery ===
A hermitage or small monastic settlement may have existed at Nun Monkton during the Anglian period in Northumbria, prior to the arrival of the Vikings, giving rise to the 'Monkton' part of the village's name. The arrival of the nuns came about a century after the Norman Conquest. In 1172 an Anglo-Norman landowner, Ivetta of the Arches, endowed a small Benedictine nunnery which owned the village and stood on the important ford route from York and Moor Monkton to the south and Beningbrough and Shipton to the north, coming across the river. These routes ended when the ferry was discontinued in the middle of the 20th century. The Priory existed until 1536 when it was dissolved by Henry VIII, despite a plea from his second wife, Anne Boleyn, that it be spared. Records suggest that some of the nuns, returned to their families with small pensions of £4 a year and still under monastic vows of celibacy, endured considerable hardship as a result of the closure of the convent.

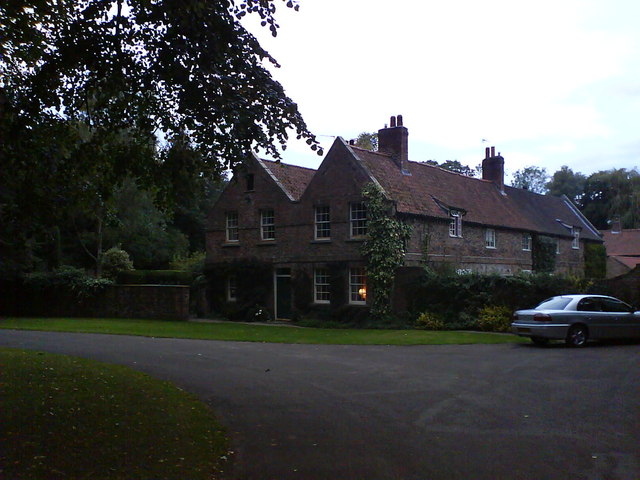
18th century cottage in Priory grounds

=== Post-Reformation village and estate ===
Though Nun Monkton village remained a single estate until the 1930s, it changed hands several times after the Protestant Reformation. Its first owner was John Neville, the 3rd Baron Latimer and the second husband of Katherine Parr the last wife of Henry VIII. Latimer, who had been granted in 1538, bequeathed it and lands in Hammerton to his daughter at his death in 1543. During the later 17th century and the first half of the 18th century, it was owned by the Payler (or Paylor) family.

On 2 July 1644 the Battle of Marston Moor, one of the largest battles ever fought on English soil, took place in fields some miles to the south-west of the village. Royalist troops under Prince Rupert crossed the Ouse between Beningbrough and Nun Monkton and proceeded on to Skip bridge where they crossed the River Nidd and joined battle with the Parliamentarian army. Because of its proximity to the battlefield, Nun Monkton must have been directly affected but there seem to be no traditions, though older villagers in the late twentieth century reported claims that fallen soldiers were buried around St Mary's Church.

In 1748 the estate and those in surrounding villages passed to William Tufnell Jolliffe upon the death of his uncle Nathaniel Payler. A painting dated to 1773 shows Squire William Tufnell with his son on horseback amid a pack of hounds, looking across from the Moor Monkton bank of the Nidd at Nun Monkton Priory and Church. Despite the passage of 251 years, the view is relatively unchanged today. An elaborate early nineteenth century monument to the Tufnell family is today in the sacristy on the north side of the church. Before 1871 it was in the old sanctuary of the church and seems to have been somewhat damaged while being moved.

George IV while Prince of Wales, is believed to have had lunch at the Priory during a visit to Yorkshire.

In the 1840s one visitor to the village would have been the novelist Anne Brontë, and her brother Branwell. During her time as a governess to the Robinson family at Thorpe Green, Little Ouseburn, Brontë taught the children of the rector of Nun Monkton.

In 1860, Isaac Crawhall, a Durham-born gentleman, bought Nun Monkton from the Tufnell family and his family owned the estate and lived at the Priory until it was bought by the Whitworth family in the 1920s. Crawhall was responsible for the redesigning of the church and the building of the new roof and chancel between 1871 and 1875.

A painting of villagers standing outside St.Mary's church by the landscape artist John Henry Leonard was sold at Christies in January 2009. It appears to date from the 1860s and may have been commissioned by Isaac Crawhall.

Nun Monkton was visited in the summer of 1898 by the future Provost of Eton and ghost story writer, M. R.James on a boat trip from York during a meeting of Convocation. James was enchanted by the Priory house and gardens and its chinoiserie summer house near the river. He wrote in a letter: "At Nun Monkton a beautiful house adjoins the church — Queen Anne with a sweet garden and leaden statues and a summerhouse." Nun Monkton later appears to have provided some of the background for his gruesome ghost story "The Ash Tree", though in the story the house is situated in Suffolk.

The largest secular building in Nun Monkton and architecturally by far the finest after the church, is the hall or manor house formally known as the Priory, and used as a location in the television series A Touch of Frost in an episode entitled "Endangered Species". Observant viewers who know the location will note that when Jack Frost (played by David Jason) drives up to The Priory it shows the gate to the left of the cattle grid, over which a temporary wall was erected for the TV programme. In the grounds of the Priory is Avenue Cottage, an 18th-century grade II listed building.

=== Church ===
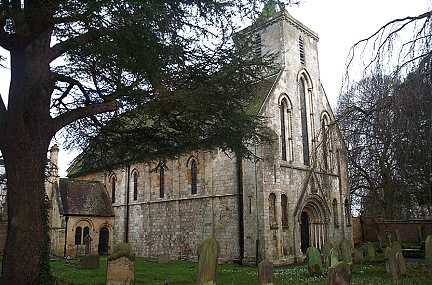
St Mary's Church

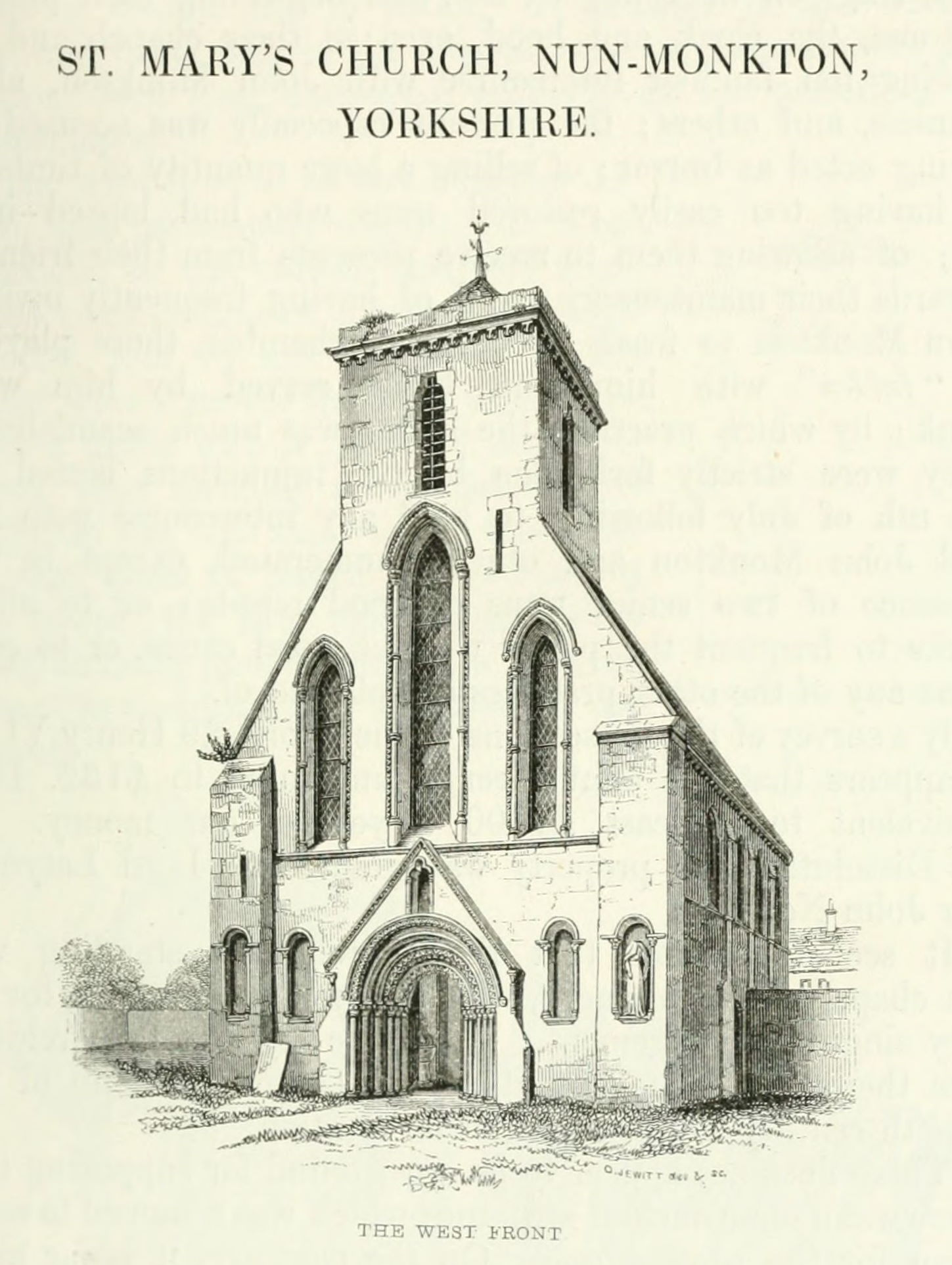
Nun Monkton West Front in 1847

The village church of St Mary's is the Church of England parish church. It is the sole surviving structure from the former priory and of considerable interest for students of Anglo-Norman architecture. At the Reformation the east end of the church was demolished and, until the 1870s, St Mary's Nun Monkton was a truncated low-roofed building with standard 18th-century Anglican fittings such as box pews and monuments. In the 1870s, however, as a result of the impact of the Tractarian movement, the village squire of the day, Isaac Crawhall, commissioned a new east end, built in high Anglican style. There is a conspicuous red sanctuary lamp, though the altar does not feature a tabernacle. Most impressive is the magnificent east window with glass by Edward Burne-Jones and William Morris which has a claim to be the best stained glass in North or West Yorkshire.

=== Village custom ===
Until the first half of the 19th century, Nun Monkton villagers annually performed a ceremony of digging up, parading, and reburying a statue supposed to represent St Peter, the village's patron saint. The custom is said to have been stopped by a vicar who regarded it as a pagan survival. The fullest modern account of it seems to be given in the adjudication ruling by A.A.Baden Fuller which ruled that the village common was a green in 1974. Fuller writes as follows:,

"St. Peter's Day, 29 June, is the Feast Day in Nun Monkton and a correspondent writing in the Daily Herald in 1868 stated that it was customary in former years to observe a Festival known as "Rising Peter", but that it was almost obsolete in 1868. According to the writer – "The Festivities extended over a week, and the same procedure was observed year after year."

On the Saturday evening preceding the 29th a company of parishioners headed by fiddlers and players of other instruments went in procession across the Great Common to Maypole Hill where there was an old sycamore tree, for the purpose of "Rising Peter", who had been buried under the tree after the last St. Peter's Day. This effigy of St. Peter, rudely carved in wood and clothed in a fantastic fashion was placed in a box and conveyed to the neighbouring house (possibly the Inn) where it was exposed to view and kept there until the following Saturday, when another procession formed and St. Peter was reinterred. This was called "burying Peter".

On the evening of the first day of the feast, young men went through the village with large baskets for the purpose of collecting tarts and cheese cakes and eggs for mulled ale, all being consumed at the above ceremonies. Afterwards – dancing, sports, and suppers took place in the village every day while the feast lasted.

== Nun Monkton today ==
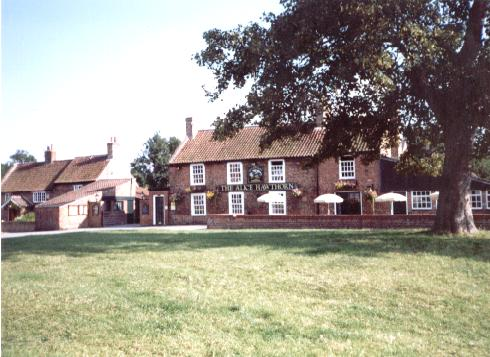
Alice Hawthorn pub, 2005

Nun Monkton ceased to be an estate village in 1934 when the estate houses of the village were sold off. The population today, of around 250, is well below its high point of about 350 in the 1890s and consists largely of commuters travelling daily to York, Harrogate and Leeds and retired people. The last shop in the village closed in 1986. The village green, however, continues to be grazed by cows and other animals and is one of the last working greens in Yorkshire. The Alice Hawthorn public house was named after the 1840s equine winner of the Doncaster Cup and Queen's Vase and was formerly The Blue Bell Inn. The Alice closed in 2007 after 220 years, but reopened after refurbishment under new management in September 2009. It has since closed and reopened under new management in summer 2013. The Yorkshire Heart Vineyard and Brewery was founded in Nun Monkton in 2000 and won a gold medal in the International Wine Challenge Cellar Door of the Year awards.

== Nun Monkton Foundation Primary School ==
There has been a school in Nun Monkton at least since the early-18th century when the Dorothy Wilson Trust was set up in York to endow education for both boys and girls in the village. The current school building dates from 1905 and was built on the playground of the earlier school. While other villages were losing their primary schools the Nun Monkton community fought hard in the 1990s to preserve its school. The school currently has Foundation status.

== Maypole ==
Nun Monkton has had a maypole at least since the 1790s. A Norwegian pine maypole was erected in 1871 by the village squire of the time, Isaac Crawhall. Constant work is needed to preserve a maypole and in the 1920s the pole had to be shortened and re-erected. A similar operation was carried out by the British Army in 1975. But in March 2004, Isaac Crawhall's 78-foot-high (24 m) green-and-white-striped maypole finally snapped and fell down in a gale. The village has now replaced the maypole with an 88-foot (27 m) pole, reportedly the tallest in England, though unlike its predecessor it is a two-piece construction.

== See also ==
- Listed buildings in Nun Monkton
- List of English abbeys, priories and friaries serving as parish churches
